= Results of the 2015 Rio Carnival =

This page are listed the results of all of the Rio Carnival on year 2015.

== Grupo Especial ==
| Pos | Samba schools | Pts | Classification or relegation |
|---|---|---|---|
| 1 | Beija-Flor | 269.9 | Carnival Champion |
| 2 | Acadêmicos do Salgueiro | 269.5 | Champions Parade |
| 3 | Acadêmicos do Grande Rio | 269 | Champions Parade |
| 4 | Unidos da Tijuca | 269 | Champions Parade |
| 5 | Portela | 269 | Champions Parade |
| 6 | Imperatriz Leopoldinense | 268.9 | Champions Parade |
| 7 | Mocidade Independente de Padre Miguel | 268.5 | |
| 8 | São Clemente | 268.4 | |
| 9 | União da Ilha do Governador | 267.2 | |
| 10 | Estação Primeira de Mangueira | 267.1 | |
| 11 | Unidos de Vila Isabel | 266,2 | |
| 12 | Unidos do Viradouro | 263.7 | Relegation to 2016 Série A |

== Série A ==
| Pos | Samba schools | Pts | Classification or relegation |
|---|---|---|---|
| 1 | Estácio de Sá | 299.7 | Promotion to 2016 Grupo Especial |
| 2 | Unidos de Padre Miguel | 299.4 | |
| 3 | Império Serrano | 299.3 | |
| 4 | Acadêmicos do Cubango | 298.9 | |
| 5 | Paraíso do Tuiuti | 298.8 | |
| 6 | Império da Tijuca | 298.7 | |
| 7 | Caprichosos de Pilares | 298.2 | |
| 8 | Inocentes de Belford Roxo | 298 | |
| 9 | Renascer de Jacarepaguá | 297.4 | |
| 10 | Acadêmicos de Santa Cruz | 296.5 | |
| 11 | Unidos do Porto da Pedra | 295.2 | |
| 12 | União do Parque Curicica | 294.8 | |
| 13 | Alegria da Zona Sul | 293.1 | |
| 14 | Unidos de Bangu | 291.9 | Relegation to 2016 Série B |
| 15 | Em Cima da Hora | 288.4 | Relegation to 2016 Série B |

== Série B ==
| Pos | Samba schools | Pts | Classification or relegation |
|---|---|---|---|
| 1 | Acadêmicos da Rocinha | 299.8 | Promotion to 2016 Série A |
| 2 | Unidos do Jacarezinho | 299.6 | |
| 3 | União de Jacarepaguá | 299.1 | |
| 4 | Tradição | 298.9 | |
| 5 | Mocidade Unida do Santa Marta | 298.5 | |
| 6 | Arranco | 298.5 | |
| 7 | Unidos de Lucas | 298.3 | |
| 8 | Arame de Ricardo | 298.2 | |
| 9 | Acadêmicos do Sossego | 297.9 | |
| 10 | Acadêmicos do Engenho da Rainha | 297.7 | |
| 11 | Unidos da Ponte | 295.4 | |
| 12 | Unidos do Cabuçu | 295.4 | |
| 13 | Favo de Acari | 295.1 | |
| 14 | Sereno de Campo Grande | 293.9 | Relegation to 2016 Grupo C |
| 15 | Unidos da Vila Santa Tereza | 293.6 | Relegation to 2016 Grupo C |
| 16 | Rosa de Ouro | 292.8 | Relegation to 2016 Grupo C |
| 17 | Unidos da Vila Kennedy | 260.9 | Relegation to 2016 Grupo C |
| 18 | Acadêmicos da Abolição | 224.2 | Relegation to 2016 Grupo C |

== Série C ==
| Pos | Samba schools | Pts | Classification or relegation |
|---|---|---|---|
| 1 | Leão de Nova Iguaçu | 299.8 | Promotion to 2016 Série B |
| 2 | Unidos das Vargens | 299.6 | Promotion to 2016 Série B |
| 3 | Lins Imperial | 299.3 | |
| 4 | Império da Praça Seca | 298.1 | |
| 5 | Arrastão de Cascadura | 297.9 | |
| 6 | Acadêmicos do Dendê | 297.4 | |
| 7 | Mocidade Unida da Cidade de Deus | 297.3 | |
| 8 | Boca de Siri | 297.2 | |
| 9 | Unidos de Manguinhos | 297 | Relegation to 2016 Grupo D |
| 10 | Difícil é o Nome | 296.9 | Relegation to 2016 Grupo D |
| 11 | Unidos da Villa Rica | 294.8 | Relegation to 2016 Grupo D |
| 12 | Mocidade de Vicente de Carvalho | 293.1 | Relegation to 2016 Grupo D |

== Série D ==
| Pos | Samba schools | Pts | Classification or relegation |
|---|---|---|---|
| 1 | Vizinha Faladeira | 299.8 | Promotion to 2016 Grupo C |
| 2 | Coroado de Jacarepaguá | 299.4 | Promotion to 2016 Grupo C |
| 3 | Matriz de São João de Meriti | 298.8 | |
| 4 | Unidos de Cosmos | 297.4 | |
| 5 | Corações Unidos do Amarelinho | 296.8 | |
| 6 | Gato de Bonsucesso | 296.3 | |
| 7 | Acadêmicos de Vigário Geral | 296.3 | |
| 8 | Mocidade Independente de Inhaúma | 295.6 | |
| 9 | Chatuba de Mesquita | 294.8 | |
| 10 | Flor da Mina do Andaraí | 294.5 | |
| 11 | Unidos do Anil | 292.7 | Relegation to 2016 Grupo E |
| 12 | Boi da Ilha do Governador | 227.4 | Relegation to 2016 Grupo E |

== Série E ==
| Pos | Samba schools | Pts | Classification or relegation |
|---|---|---|---|
| 1 | Império da Uva | 188.3 | Promotion to 2016 Grupo D |
| 2 | Alegria do Vilar | 187.5 | Promotion to 2016 Grupo D |
| 3 | Colibri de Mesquita | 186.9 | |
| 4 | Chora na Rampa | 185.7 | |
| 5 | Delírio da Zona Oeste | 183.6 | |
| 6 | Tupy de Brás de Pina | 183.4 | |
| 7 | Unidos do Cabral | 183 | |
| 8 | Acadêmicos de Madureira | 182.7 | |
| 9 | Samba é Nosso | 177.7 | |
