= Márcia Lage =

Brazilian carnival designer (1960–2025)

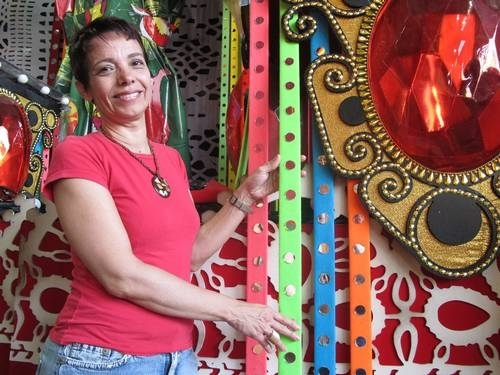
- Born: Márcia Leal de Souza Lage; 27 February 1960; Rio de Janeiro, Brazil
- Died: 19 January 2025 (aged 64); Rio de Janeiro, Brazil
- Occupations: Set designer, carnival organizer
- Years active: 1981–2025
- Spouse: Renato Lage

Márcia Leal de Souza Lage (27 February 1960 – 19 January 2025) was a Brazilian set designer and carnival organizer at the Rio Carnival who worked for a large part of her career with her husband, fellow organizer Renato Lage.

== Biography ==
Lage was born in Rio de Janeiro on 27 February 1960. She studied at the Escola de Belas Artes, where she was a student of great carnival organizers such as Fernando Pamplona, Maria Augusta Rodrigues, Marie Louise Nery and Rosa Magalhães. In 1981, Márcia was invited by Rosa to work as an assistant in the historical carnival bloc Bum Bum Paticumbum Prugurundum (1982). She was also an assistant in Salgueiro and in Tradição. Márcia also worked as a set designer for television before meeting Renato Lage and beginning to work as his assistant in 1990. In 1992, Renato separated from his then-wife Lilian Rabello, with whom he took part in the carnival blocs of Mocidade and began a romance with Márcia. Afterwards, the two married. Despite performing with Renato since the start of the 1990s, Márcia only began to officially work with the carnival blocs since the 2002 Rio Carnival, her last year at Mocidade. In 2003, the couple moved to Salgueiro. In 2007, they took part in the carnival commission created by Império de Casa Verde. They won the A Access Group of Rio in the 2008 with the enredo Taí, eu fiz tudo pra você gostar de mim, by Império Serrano.

With the accession of the Império Serrano to the Grupo Especial at the 2009 carnival, the Lages could not participate with two samba schools in the same tier, and for the first time, Márcia signed with Império Serrano alone, while Renato stayed with Salgueiro. Império was demoted again, while Salgueiro, 18 years after their big success with “Peguei um Ita no Norte”, won the title. The following carnival, Márcia was about to be hired as a carnival organizer for Mangueira, but was let go by the school. She would return to be a duo with her husband in Salgueiro. She made carnival blocs with Vai Vai in 2016 and stayed with Salgueiro in 2017. In 2018, the couple left for Grande Rio, however, as the school had an enredo about Chacrinha, the school had problems, being the most well-known school to not enter the last float. Despite being demoted, LIESA simply decided that, for the second time, there would be no demotions from the Grupo Especial, which was controversial at the time. At the 2019 carnival with Grande Rio, the enredo Quem Nunca was made, making an allusion to the "Brazilian jeitinho for solving things" which was seen as a criticism of the turnaround of the decision the year prior. In 2020, 2022, and 2023, the Lages signed with Portela. The three blocs were not as successful, being that the enredo about the 100-year anniversary of Portela in 2023 ended with serious issues in its finishing, the understanding of the enredo, and a hole in one of the sections of the bloc. The school was embittered by being placed in one of the lowest places. In 2024, the couple "rested" from their careers, and just started to only watch the blocs. However, the couple began to return to their careers and had planned to make a return after 23 years to Mocidade.

=== Death ===
Lage died on 19 January 2025 at 64 years old, the victim of leukemia. She was veiled and cremated at the Cemitério Vertical Memorial do Carmo, in Caju in the North Zone of Rio de Janeiro.

== Carnivals ==
Below is the list of carnival blocs done by Lage.

Year	School	Place	Division	Enredo	Ref.
2002	Mocidade Independente	4th place	Especial RJ	O Grande Circo Místico	
2003	Salgueiro	7th place	Especial RJ	Salgueiro, minha paixão, minha raiz - 50 anos de glórias	
2004	Salgueiro	6th place	Especial RJ	A cana que aqui se planta, tudo dá, até energia… Álcool, o combustível do futuro	
2005	Salgueiro	5th place	Especial RJ	Do fogo que ilumina a vida, Salgueiro é chama que não se apaga	
2006	Salgueiro	11th place	Especial RJ	Microcosmos: o que os olhos não veem, o coração sente	
2007	Salgueiro	7th place	Especial RJ	Candaces	
2007	Império de Casa Verde	5th place	Especial SP	Glórias e Conquistas - A Força do Império está no salto do Tigre	
2008	Salgueiro	Vice-c	Especial RJ	O Rio de Janeiro continua sendo…	
2008	Império Serrano	Champion	Grupo A	Taí, eu fiz tudo para você gostar de mim	
2009	Império Serrano	12th place	Especial RJ	A Lenda das Sereias e os Mistérios do Mar	
2011	Salgueiro	5th place	Especial RJ	Salgueiro Apresenta: o Rio no Cinema	
2012	Salgueiro	Vice-champion	Especial RJ	Cordel branco e encarnado	
2013	Salgueiro	5th place	Especial RJ	Fama	
2014	Salgueiro	Vice-champion	Especial RJ	Gaia - A vida em nossas mãos	
2015	Salgueiro	Vice-champion	Especial RJ	Do Fundo do Quintal, Saberes e Sabores na Sapucaí	
2016	Salgueiro	4th place	Especial RJ	A Ópera dos Malandros	
2016	Vai-Vai	4th place	Especial SP	Je Suis Vai-Vai	
2017	Salgueiro	3rd place	Especial RJ	A Divina Comédia Do Carnaval	
2018	Grande Rio	12th place	Especial RJ	Vai para o trono ou não vai?	
2019	Grande Rio	9th place	Especial RJ	Quem nunca...? Que atire a primeira pedra	
2020	Portela	7th place	Especial RJ	Guajupiá, Terra sem Males	
2022	Portela	5th place	Especial RJ	Igi Osè Baobá	
2023	Portela	10th place	Especial RJ	O Azul que vem do infinito	
2025	Mocidade Independente		Especial RJ	"Voltando para o futuro – Não há limites pra sonhar"	

== Awards ==
- Gold Standard
1. 2006 – Best enredo (Salgueiro - "Microcosmos: o que os olhos não veem, o coração sente")
2. 2013 – Best enredo (Salgueiro - "Fama")
3. 2016 – Best enredo (Salgueiro - "A Ópera dos Malandros")
- Star of the Carnival
1. 2011 – Best set of allegories (Salgueiro)
2. 2013 – Best set of costumes (Salgueiro)
3. 2014 – Best set of costumes (Salgueiro)
4. 2015 – Best set of allegories (Salgueiro)
5. 2016 – Best enredo (Salgueiro - "A Ópera dos Malandros")
- Gato de Prata
1. 2011 – Best enredo ("Salgueiro Apresenta: o Rio no Cinema")
2. 2015 – Best carnaval set designers (Salgueiro)
- Prêmio 100% Carnival
1. 2022 – Best set of costumes (Portela)
- Veja Rio Award
1. 2014 – Best allegory (Abre-alas do Salgueiro)
- S@mba-Net
1. 2022 – Best set of costumes (Portela)
- Tamborim de Ouro
1. 2014 – Enredo Maravilha (Salgueiro - "Gaia - A Vida em Nossas Mãos")
2. 2014 - Best set of allegories (Salgueiro)
- Andarilho do Samba Trophy
1. 2008 – Best enredo (Império Serrano - "Taí, Eu Fiz Tudo para Você Gostar de Mim")
- Jorge Lafond Trophy
1. 2008 – Best enredo (Império Serrano - "Taí, Eu Fiz Tudo para Você Gostar de Mim")
- Sambario Trophy
1. 2011 – Best allegory (King Kong no Relógio da Central)
- Tupi Carnival Total Trophy
1. 2011 – Melhor carnavalesco(a) (Salgueiro)
2. 2022 - Melhor conjunto de fantasias (Portela)
