= David Corrêa =

Brazilian singer-songwriter (1937–2020)

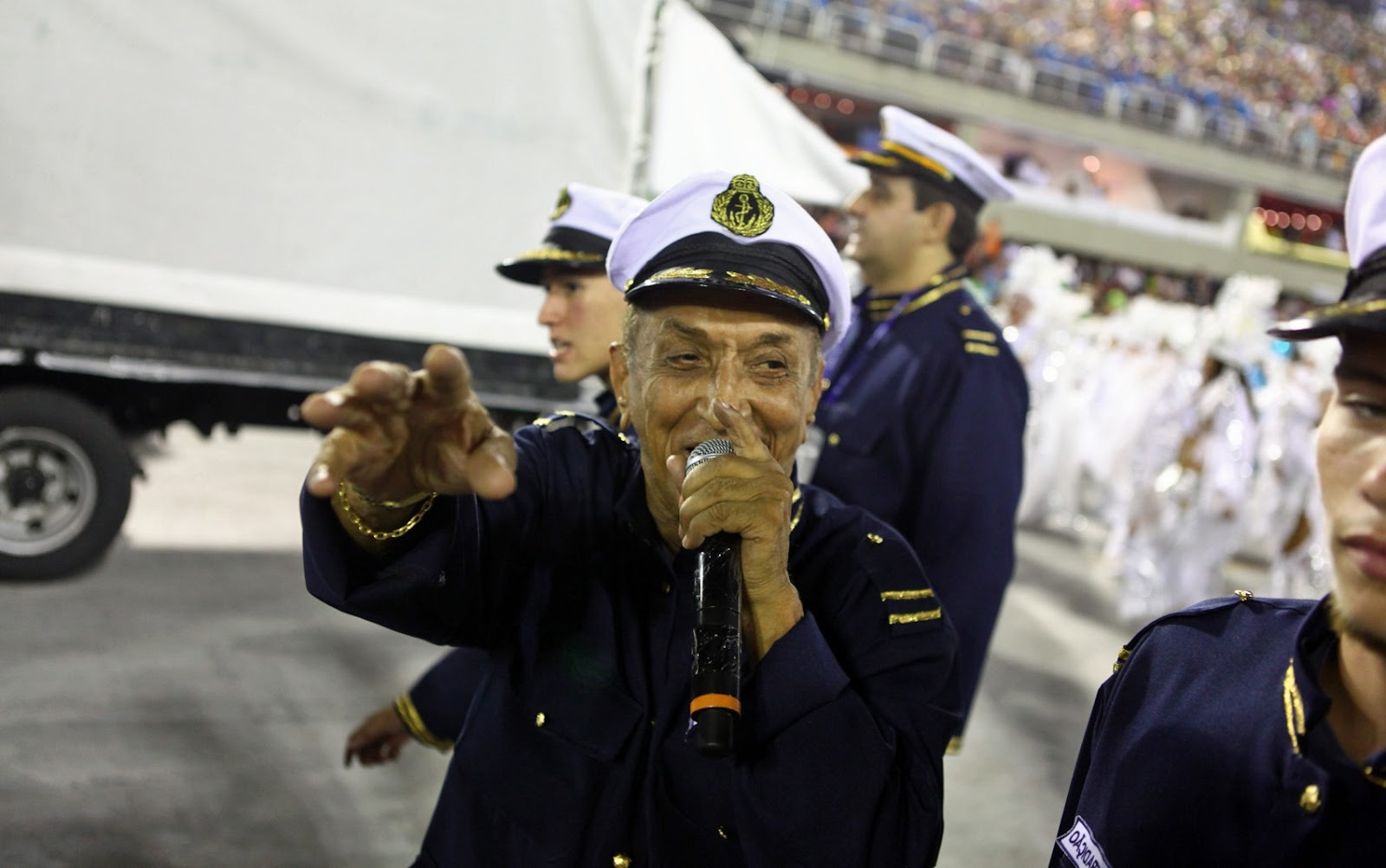

Background information
- Born: David Antônio Corrêa; June 5, 1937; São João de Meriti, Rio de Janeiro, Brazil
- Died: May 10, 2020 (aged 82) Rio de Janeiro, Rio de Janeiro, Brazil
- Genres: Samba, samba-enredo, pagode
- Occupation: Singer-songwriter
- Instrument: Vocals
- Years active: 1972–2020
- Labels: Polydor, RGE, 3M, Chantecler, Top Tape

David Antônio Corrêa (5 June 1937 – 10 May 2020) was a Brazilian singer-songwriter of the genres samba, samba-enredo and pagode.

== Life ==
As a singer-songwriter, Corrêa released four studio albums and three extended plays from 1976 to 1991.

At the Rio de Janeiro carnival, Corrêa composed various Samba-enredos for various Samba schools, such as Portela, Acadêmicos do Salgueiro, Unidos de Vila Isabel, Imperatriz Leopoldinense, Estação Primeira de Mangueira, Estácio de Sá and Unidos da Ponte, over his 19 years samba-enredo composer career. His most successful year was 1980, in which Portela, the school he was representing and composed the samba-enredo for, won the Rio Carnival samba school parade.

== Death ==
On 17 April 2020, Corrêa was run over by a vehicle in Rio de Janeiro, which required him to be hospitalized to have surgery.

Less than a month after being run over, Corrêa died in Rio de Janeiro after following kidney failure brought on by COVID-19 during the COVID-19 pandemic in Brazil.

== Samba-enredos composed for Rio Carnival ==
Year	Division	Samba school	Place	Samba-enredo	Refs
1973	Group 1	Portela	4th	Pasárgada, o Amigo do Rei	
1975	Group 1	Portela	5th	Macunaíma, Herói de Nossa Gente	
1979	Group 1A	Portela	3rd	Incrível, Fantástico, Extraordinário	
1980	Group 1A	Portela	Winner	Hoje Tem Marmelada	
1980	Group 1B	Unidos da Ponte	10th	Maravilhosa Marajó	
1981	Group 1A	Portela	3rd	Das Maravilhas do Mar, Fez-se o Esplendor de Uma Noite	
1982	Group 1A	Portela	2nd	Meu Brasil Brasileiro	
1984	Group 1A	Acadêmicos do Salgueiro	4th	Skindô, Skindô	
1985	Group 1A	Unidos de Vila Isabel	3rd	Parece Até que Foi Ontem	
1986	Group 1A	Unidos de Vila Isabel	11th	De Alegria Cantei, de Alegria Pulei, de Três em Três, pelo Mundo Rodei	
1988	Group 1	Imperatriz Leopoldinense	14th	Conta Outra que Essa Foi Boa	
1994	Special Group	Estação Primeira de Mangueira	11th	Atrás da Verde e Rosa Só não Vai Quem Já Morreu	
1995	Special Group	Estácio de Sá	7th	Uma Vez Flamengo...	
2002	Special Group	Portela	8th	Amazonas, Esse Desconhecido. Delírios e Verdades do Eldorado Verde	

== Discography ==
=== Studio albums ===
Year	Album	Album details
1976	Menino Bom	Label: Polydor Records; Format: Vinyl
1981	Lição de Malandragem	Label: Top Tape; Format: Vinyl
1986	Pique Brasileiro (With Aloísio Machado and Gracia do Salgueiro)	Label: 3M; Format: Vinyl
1991	Chopp Escuro	Label: CID; Format: Vinyl

=== Extended plays ===
Year	Album	Album details
1977	CPS	Label: Chantecler; Format: Vinyl
1979	CPS	Label: RGE; Format: Vinyl
1980	CPS	Label: Top Tape; Format: Vinyl
