= Fernando Pamplona =

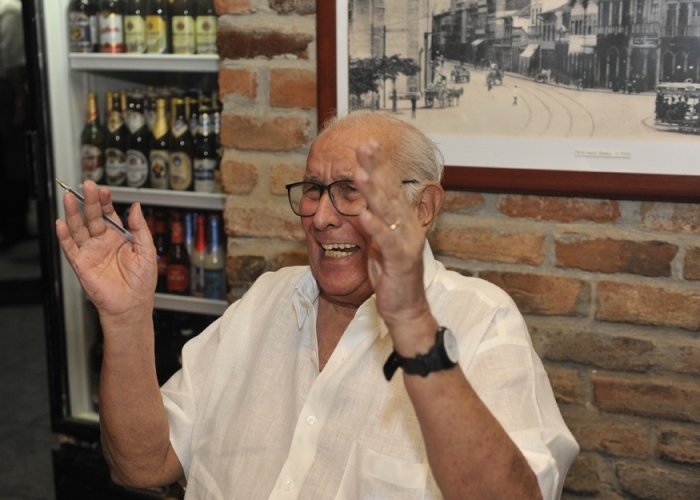
- Born: 26 September 1926; Rio de Janeiro, Brazil
- Died: 29 September 2013 (aged 87); Rio de Janeiro, Brazil
- Occupations: Set designer, carnival organizer

Fernando Pamplona (26 September 1926 – 29 September 2013) was a Brazilian carnival organizer, scenographer, teacher, producer, and television presenter. He is considered one of the most important names in the Rio Carnival during his career.

== Biography ==
Pamplona was born on 26 September 1926 in Rio de Janeiro. After the Revolution of 1930, he went with his father to live in the city of Xapuri, in the state of Acre, where he began primary school. While still a child, he became exposed to various folkloric demonstrations specific to the region, such as Bumba Meu Boi, which was crucial for him to develop a great interest in popular culture. A graduate of the National School of Fine Arts, he had a brief career as an actor before me met Mário Conde in the middle of the 1950s, which led him to pursue scenography.

In 1959, writer Miericio Tati, a member of what was then the Municipal Department of Tourism and Competitions (now Riotur) called Pamplona so he could join the jury for the competition of the carnival blocs of the samba schools of Rio de Janeiro. Though he had assumed position with dedication, he would become privy to Acadêmicos do Salgueiro, which that year had innovated the standards of Rio Carnival with regard to its enredos de capa-e-espada (enredos about politicians or military figures) that were brought by the schools. That year, the school created an enredo about the French painter Jean-Baptiste Debret. Such a theme, dubbed "Viagem pitoresca e histórica ao Brasil", was joined by such artists such as Dirceu and Marie Louise Nery. Pamplona gave Salgueiro an 8, but the school lost by only one point to Portela.

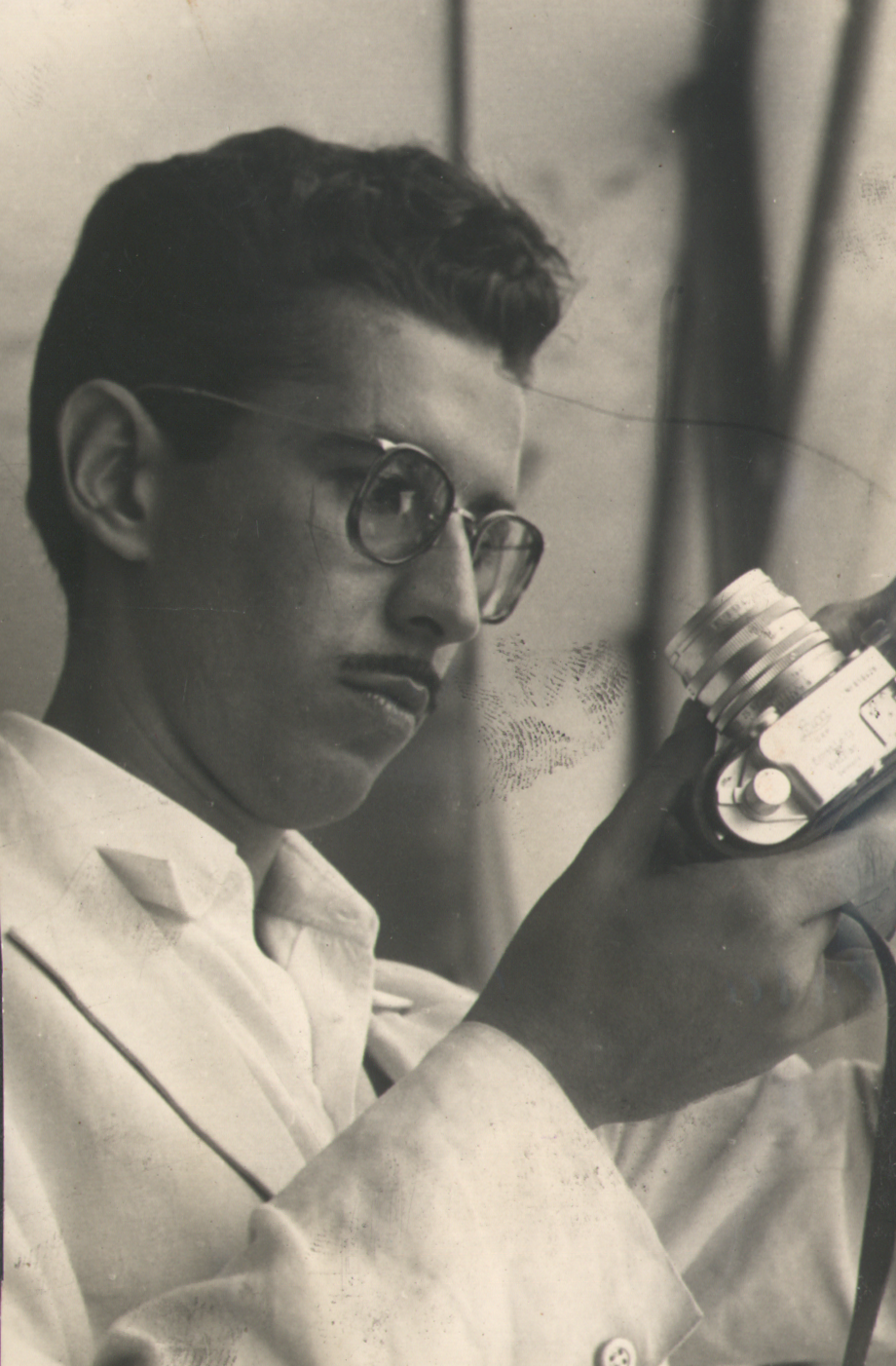
Fernando Pamplona in 1956

He was one of the few jury members to ardently defend his evaluation of the samba schools, which surprised Salgueiro's director, Nelson de Andrade. The directory of the school, through an intermediary of Andrade, invited him to prepare a bloc for the school for the 1960 carnival. Pamplona accepted the request on the condition that the enredo would be about Zumbi dos Palmares. He also called on his theatre colleagues, Arlindo Rodrigues and Nilton Sá, and with that he became a carnival organizer for the school.

While with Salgueiro, he helped to win four titles and came in second another 3 times. Pamplona lent his name to the library of the Reference Center of Carnival, the only one for the genre in Brazil.

He collaborated artistically with his authorship in Mocidade Portuguesa Feminina: boletim mensal (1939–1947).

In 1986, he was given tribute by Salgueiro with the enredo "Tem que se tirar da cabeça aquilo que não se tem no bolso".

He was an employee at TVE in Rio de Janeiro, where he was a scenographer, producer, and presenter. In 1975, he produced the educational telenovela João da Silva. In 1980, he implemented the station's carnival coverage, showing the main stage, as well as smaller groups and ranchos. Starting in 184, he would become a commentator on the recently created Rede Manchete, a position he would be in until 1997. He would also make a brief return as a commentator on Rede Bandeirantes, in their coverage on the champion carnival blocs in 2004.

Afterwards, Pamplona had begun to prefer to not be involved with carnival. In one of his last interviews, in January 2013 with the newspaper O Dia, he had said that he had not watched carnival for seven years by that point as he had travelled to Corrêas, in Petrópolis. Pamplona was a critic of the "marching" samba-enredos and of the absence of sambas de quadra which were created throughout the year. Of the last professionals that he kept up with, he praised the work of Paulo Barros and, in his words, had created something different after Joãosinho Trinta's career.

His last work was a collection of stories about carnival and Salgueiro titled O Encarnado e o Branco.

Pamplona died on the morning of 29 September 2013, in his house in Copacabana, the victim of cancer.

In 2015, he received a posthumous tribute by São Clemente samba school, which created a bloc inspired by his life and work, exalting his contributions to Rio Carnival. Fellow organizer Rosa Magalhães was responsible for the presentation.

== Enredos done by Pamplona ==
Year	School	Place	Division	Enredo
1960	Salgueiro	Champion	1	Quilombo dos Palmares
1961	Salgueiro	Vice-Champion	1	Vida e obra do Aleijadinho
1964	Salgueiro	Vice-Champion	1	Chico Rei
1965	Salgueiro	Champion	1	História do Carnaval Carioca
1967	Salgueiro	3rd place	1	História da liberdade no Brasil
1968	Salgueiro	3rd place	1	Dona Beja, a feiticeira de Araxá
1969	Salgueiro	Champion	1	Bahia de Todos os Deuses
1970	Salgueiro	Vice-champion	1	Praça XI carioca da gema
1971	Salgueiro	Champion	1	Festa para um rei negro
1972	Salgueiro	5th place	1	Nossa madrinha, Mangueira querida
1977	Salgueiro	4th place	1	Do Cauim ao Efó, moça branca, branquinha
1978	Salgueiro	6th place	1	Do Yorubá à luz, an aurora dos deuses
1997	Em Cima da Hora	5th place	A	Sérgio Cabral a cara do Rio

== Awards ==
Gold Standard

2013 - Special prize

Tamborim de Ouro

2015 - Special hommage (in memorian)

== Bibliography ==
- O ENCARNADO E O BRANCO. Editora Nova Terra, 2013.
