= Imperatriz Leopoldinense =

Samba school from Rio de Janeiro

Imperatriz
- Foundation: 6 March 1959; 67 years ago
- Blessing school: Império Serrano

The samba school Imperatriz Leopoldinense was created on March 6, 1956 in the suburb of Ramos, in Rio de Janeiro. It is named after Maria Leopoldina, archduchess of Austria and Empress of Brazil, consort of Emperor Pedro I.

Imperatriz began its successful journey to victory in 1980 when it won the championship for the first time. Since then it won the first prize eight times.

From 1992 to 2009, the school had a carnival as a teacher, artist, set designer and costume designer Rosa Magalhães, who has five titles to college.

== Imperatriz Leopoldinense's championships ==
- 1980: O que que a Bahia tem First championship of the school together with Portela and Beija-Flor. The theme was the state of Bahia and its traditions.
- 1981: O teu cabelo não nega Imperatriz was the only champion. The theme refers to an ancient Brazilian composer.
- 1989: Liberdade, liberdade, abre as asas sobre nós Luxury and happiness were the two main features of the parade of Imperatriz. The theme recalls the history of Brazilian republican history.
- 1994: Catarina de Médicis na corte dos Tupínambôs e Tabajeres Very impressive floats and costumes were the main features of this presentation which tells us the story of a feast based in Brazilian Indian rites, in the city of Rouen, France, in the 16th century.
- 1995: Mais vale um jegue que me caregue que um camelo que me derrube, lá no Ceará The theme focused on the importation of camels to be used as transportation in the Northeast of Brazil during the second half of the 19th century.
- 1999: Brasil mostra a sua cara em... Theatrum Rerum Naturalium Brasilie The theme was a 17th-century book called Theatrum Rerum Naturalium Brasilie which shows the first realistic drawings of Brazilian fauna and flora.
- 2000: Quem descobriu o Brasil, foi seu Cabral, no dia 22 de abril, dois meses depois do carnaval The theme was an homage to the 500 years of the Discovery of Brazil by the Portuguese navigators.
- 2001: Cana-caiana, cana roxa, cana fita, cana preta, amarela, Pernambuco... Quero vê descê o suco, na pancada do ganzá The theme tells the story of the sugar cane in Brazil, with a detour to talk about the "cachaça", the most famous Brazilian spirit which is made out of the sugar cane.
- 2023: O Aperreio do Cabra Que o Excomungado Tratou com Má-querença e o Santíssimo Não Deu Guarida The plot revolves around the fantastic stories told through traditional northeastern Cordel literature of the famous cangaceiro known as Lampião.

== Classifications ==
Year	Place	Division	Plot	Carnivals Producers
Year	Place	Division	Plot	Singers
1960	6th place	Grupo 3	Homenagem à Academia Brasileira de Letras	Amaury Jório; Oswaldo Pereira; Leonam Martins
1960	6th place	Grupo 3	Homenagem à Academia Brasileira de Letras	Raymundo Martins
1961	Champion	Grupo 3	Riquezas e Maravilhas do Brasil	Amaury Jório; Oswaldo Pereira; Leonam Martins
1961	Champion	Grupo 3	Riquezas e Maravilhas do Brasil	Raymundo Martins
1962	5th place	Grupo 2	Rio no Século XVIII	Amaury Jório
1962	5th place	Grupo 2	Rio no Século XVIII	Raymundo Martins
1963	3rd place	Grupo 2	As Três Capitais	Amaury Jório; Maurílio Silva
1963	3rd place	Grupo 2	As Três Capitais	Raymundo Martins
1964	Vice Champion	Grupo 2	A Favorita do Imperador	Amaury Jório; Antônio Carbonelli; Paulo Freitas
1964	Vice Champion	Grupo 2	A Favorita do Imperador	Raymundo Martins
1965	10th place	Grupo 1	Homenagem ao Brasil no IV Centenário do Rio de Janeiro	Amaury Jório; Antônio Carbonelli; Paulo Freitas
1965	10th place	Grupo 1	Homenagem ao Brasil no IV Centenário do Rio de Janeiro	Raymundo Martins
1966	Vice Champion	Group 2	Monarquia e Esplendor da História	Amaury Jório; Antônio Carbonelli; Paulo Freitas
1966	Vice Champion	Group 2	Monarquia e Esplendor da História	Raymundo Martins
1967	9th place	Grupo 1	A Vida poética de Olavo Bilac	Ary Reis; Júlio Mattos
1967	9th place	Grupo 1	A Vida poética de Olavo Bilac	Dom Barbosa
1968	Vice Champion	Group 2	Bahia em Festa	Armando Iglesias; Antônio Carbonelli; Paulo Freitas
1968	Vice Champion	Group 2	Bahia em Festa	Dom Barbosa
1969	8th place	Grupo 1	Brasil, Flor Amorosa de Três Raças	Armando Iglesias; Antônio Carbonelli; Paulo Freitas
1969	8th place	Grupo 1	Brasil, Flor Amorosa de Três Raças	Dom Barbosa
1970	6th place	Grupo 1	Oropa, França e Bahia	Armando Iglesias; Antônio Carbonelli; Paulo Freitas
1970	6th place	Grupo 1	Oropa, França e Bahia	Mathias de Freitas
1971	7th place	Grupo 1	Barra de Ouro, Barra de Rio, Barra de Saia	Armando Iglesias; Antônio Carbonelli; Paulo Freitas
1971	7th place	Grupo 1	Barra de Ouro, Barra de Rio, Barra de Saia	Mathias de Freitas
1972	4th place	Grupo 1	Martim Cererê	Armando Iglesias; Antônio Carbonelli; Paulo Freitas
1972	4th place	Grupo 1	Martim Cererê	Zé Katimba
1973	5th place	Grupo 1	ABC do Carnaval à Maneira da Literatura de Cordel	Armando Iglesias; Antônio Carbonelli; Paulo Freitas
1973	5th place	Grupo 1	ABC do Carnaval à Maneira da Literatura de Cordel	Dom Barbosa
1974	6th place	Grupo 1	Réquiem por um Sambista - Silas de Oliveira	Armando Iglesias; Antônio Carbonelli; Paulo Freitas
1974	6th place	Grupo 1	Réquiem por um Sambista - Silas de Oliveira	Jorge Goulart; Wilson Corrêa
1975	8th place	Grupo 1	A Morte da Porta-estandarte	Armando Iglesias; Antônio Carbonelli; Paulo Freitas
1975	8th place	Grupo 1	A Morte da Porta-estandarte	Jorge Goulart; Toninho
1976	8th place	Grupo 1	Por Mares Nunca Dantes Navegados	Edson Machado
1976	8th place	Grupo 1	Por Mares Nunca Dantes Navegados	Jorge Goulart; Toninho
1977	9th place	Grupo 1	Viagem Fantástica às Terras de Ibirapitanga	Max Lopes
1977	9th place	Grupo 1	Viagem Fantástica às Terras de Ibirapitanga	Jorge Goulart; Toninho
1978	Vice Champion	Grupo 2	Vamos Brincar de Ser Criança	Max Lopes
1978	Vice Champion	Grupo 2	Vamos Brincar de Ser Criança	Toninho
1979	7th place	Grupo 1A	Oxumaré, A Lenda do Arco-iris	Mário Barcellos
1979	7th place	Grupo 1A	Oxumaré, A Lenda do Arco-iris	Dominguinhos do Estácio
1980	Champion	Grupo 1A	O Que que a Bahia tem?	Arlindo Rodrigues
1980	Champion	Grupo 1A	O Que que a Bahia tem?	Dominguinhos do Estácio
1981	Champion	Grupo 1A	O Teu Cabelo Não Nega (Só Dá Lalá)	Arlindo Rodrigues
1981	Champion	Grupo 1A	O Teu Cabelo Não Nega (Só Dá Lalá)	Dominguinhos do Estácio
1982	3rd place	Grupo 1A	Onde Canta o Sabiá	Arlindo Rodrigues
1982	3rd place	Grupo 1A	Onde Canta o Sabiá	Dominguinhos do Estácio
1983	4th place	Grupo 1A	O Rei da Costa do Marfim visita Xica de Silva em Diamantina	Arlindo Rodrigues
1983	4th place	Grupo 1A	O Rei da Costa do Marfim visita Xica de Silva em Diamantina	Gera
1984	4th place	Grupo 1A	Alô Mamãe	Rosa Magalhães; Lícia Lacerda
1984	4th place	Grupo 1A	Alô Mamãe	Toninho
1985	8th place	Grupo 1A	Adolã, A Cidade Mistério	João Felício; José Félix
1985	8th place	Grupo 1A	Adolã, A Cidade Mistério	Preto Jóia
1986	8th place	Grupo 1A	Um Jeito Pra Ninguém Botar Defeito (Agüenta Coração)	Fernando Alvarez
1986	8th place	Grupo 1A	Um Jeito Pra Ninguém Botar Defeito (Agüenta Coração)	Toninho
1987	6th place	Grupo 1	Estrela Dalva	Arlindo Rodrigues
1987	6th place	Grupo 1	Estrela Dalva	Alexandre D'Mendes
1988	14th place	Grupo 1	Conta Outra Que Essa Foi Boa	Luiz Fernando Reis
1988	14th place	Grupo 1	Conta Outra Que Essa Foi Boa	Alexandre D'Mendes
1989	Champion	Grupo 1	Liberdade, Liberdade! Abra As Asas Sobre Nós!	Max Lopes
1989	Champion	Grupo 1	Liberdade, Liberdade! Abra As Asas Sobre Nós!	Dominguinhos do Estácio
1990	4th place	Grupo Especial	Terra Brasilis, O Que Se Plantou Deu	Max Lopes
1990	4th place	Grupo Especial	Terra Brasilis, O Que Se Plantou Deu	Dominguinhos do Estácio
1991	3rd place	Grupo Especial	O Que é Que a Banana Tem?	Viriato Ferreira
1991	3rd place	Grupo Especial	O Que é Que a Banana Tem?	Preto Jóia
1992	3rd place	Grupo Especial	Não Existe Pecado Abaixo do Equador	Rosa Magalhães
1992	3rd place	Grupo Especial	Não Existe Pecado Abaixo do Equador	Preto Jóia
1993	Vice Champion	Grupo Especial	Marquês Que É Marquês Do Saçarico É Freguês!	Rosa Magalhães
1993	Vice Champion	Grupo Especial	Marquês Que É Marquês Do Saçarico É Freguês!	Preto Jóia
1994	Champion	Grupo Especial	Catarina De Médicis Na Corte Dos Tupinambôs e Tabajeres	Rosa Magalhães
1994	Champion	Grupo Especial	Catarina De Médicis Na Corte Dos Tupinambôs e Tabajeres	Preto Jóia
1995	Champion	Grupo Especial	Mais Vale Um Jegue Que Me Carregue Do Que Um Camelo Que Me Derrube... Lá No Ceará!	Rosa Magalhães
1995	Champion	Grupo Especial	Mais Vale Um Jegue Que Me Carregue Do Que Um Camelo Que Me Derrube... Lá No Ceará!	Preto Jóia
1996	Vice Champion	Grupo Especial	Imperatriz Leopoldinense Honrosamente Apresenta: Leopoldina, a Imperatriz Do Brasil	Rosa Magalhães
1996	Vice Champion	Grupo Especial	Imperatriz Leopoldinense Honrosamente Apresenta: Leopoldina, a Imperatriz Do Brasil	Preto Jóia
1997	6th place	Grupo Especial	Eu Sou Da Lira, Não Posso Negar...	Rosa Magalhães
1997	6th place	Grupo Especial	Eu Sou Da Lira, Não Posso Negar...	Preto Jóia
1998	3rd place	Grupo Especial	Quase Ano 2000...	Rosa Magalhães
1998	3rd place	Grupo Especial	Quase Ano 2000...	Preto Jóia
1999	Champion	Grupo Especial	Brasil, Mostra A Sua Cara Em... Theatrum Rerum Naturalium Brasiliae	Rosa Magalhães
1999	Champion	Grupo Especial	Brasil, Mostra A Sua Cara Em... Theatrum Rerum Naturalium Brasiliae	Preto Jóia
2000	Champion	Grupo Especial	Quem Descobriu O Brasil, Foi Seu Cabral, No Dia 22 De Abril, Dois Meses Depois Do Carnaval	Rosa Magalhães
2000	Champion	Grupo Especial	Quem Descobriu O Brasil, Foi Seu Cabral, No Dia 22 De Abril, Dois Meses Depois Do Carnaval	Paulinho Mocidade
2001	Champion	Grupo Especial	Cana-caiana, Cana Roxa, Cana Fita, Cana Preta, Amarela, Pernambuco... Quero Vê Descê O Suco Na Pancada Do Ganzá!	Rosa Magalhães
2001	Champion	Grupo Especial	Cana-caiana, Cana Roxa, Cana Fita, Cana Preta, Amarela, Pernambuco... Quero Vê Descê O Suco Na Pancada Do Ganzá!	Paulinho Mocidade
2002	3rd place	Grupo Especial	Goytacazes... Tupy Or Not Tupy, In A South American Way!	Rosa Magalhães
2002	3rd place	Grupo Especial	Goytacazes... Tupy Or Not Tupy, In A South American Way!	Paulinho Mocidade
2003	4th place	Grupo Especial	Nem Todo Pirata Tem a Perna de Pau, O Olho de Vidro e a Cara de Mau	Rosa Magalhães
2003	4th place	Grupo Especial	Nem Todo Pirata Tem a Perna de Pau, O Olho de Vidro e a Cara de Mau	David do Pandeiro
2004	5th place	Grupo Especial	Breazail	Rosa Magalhães
2004	5th place	Grupo Especial	Breazail	Ronaldo Yllê
2005	4th place	Grupo Especial	Uma Delirante Confusão Fabulística	Rosa Magalhães
2005	4th place	Grupo Especial	Uma Delirante Confusão Fabulística	Ronaldo Yllê
2006	9th place	Grupo Especial	Um Por Todos e Todos Por Um	Rosa Magalhães
2006	9th place	Grupo Especial	Um Por Todos e Todos Por Um	Ronaldo Yllê
2007	9th place	Grupo Especial	Teresinhaa, Uhuhuuu!!!! Vocês Querem Bacalhau?	Rosa Magalhães
2007	9th place	Grupo Especial	Teresinhaa, Uhuhuuu!!!! Vocês Querem Bacalhau?	Preto Jóia
2008	6th place	Grupo Especial	João e Marias	Rosa Magalhães
2008	6th place	Grupo Especial	João e Marias	Preto Jóia
2009	7th place	Grupo Especial	Imperatriz… Só quer mostrar que faz samba também!	Rosa Magalhães
2009	7th place	Grupo Especial	Imperatriz… Só quer mostrar que faz samba também!	Paulinho Mocidade
2010	8th place	Grupo Especial	Brasil de todos os deuses	Max Lopes
2010	8th place	Grupo Especial	Brasil de todos os deuses	Dominguinhos do Estácio
2011	6th place	Grupo Especial	A Imperatriz adverte: sambar faz bem à saúde	Max Lopes
2011	6th place	Grupo Especial	A Imperatriz adverte: sambar faz bem à saúde	Dominguinhos do Estácio
2012	10th place	Grupo Especial	Jorge, amado Jorge	Max Lopes
2012	10th place	Grupo Especial	Jorge, amado Jorge	Dominguinhos do Estácio
2013	4th place	Grupo Especial	Pará - O Muiraquitã do Brasil. Sobre a nudez forte da verdade, o manto diáfano da fantasia	Cahê Rodrigues; Mário Monteiro; Kaká Monteiro
2013	4th place	Grupo Especial	Pará - O Muiraquitã do Brasil. Sobre a nudez forte da verdade, o manto diáfano da fantasia	Dominguinhos do Estácio; Wander Pires
2013	4th place	Grupo Especial	Arthur X – O Reino do Galinho de Ouro na Corte da Imperatriz	Cahê Rodrigues
2013	4th place	Grupo Especial	Arthur X – O Reino do Galinho de Ouro na Corte da Imperatriz	Wander Pires
2015	6th place	Grupo Especial	Axé Nkenda – Um ritual de liberdade – E que voz da liberdade seja sempre a nossa voz	Cahê Rodrigues
2015	6th place	Grupo Especial	Axé Nkenda – Um ritual de liberdade – E que voz da liberdade seja sempre a nossa voz	Nêgo
2016	6th place	Grupo Especial	"É o amor, que mexe com a minha cabeça e me deixa assim". Do sonho de um caipira, nascem os filhos do Brasil	Cahê Rodrigues
2016	6th place	Grupo Especial	"É o amor, que mexe com a minha cabeça e me deixa assim". Do sonho de um caipira, nascem os filhos do Brasil	Marquinho Art'Samba
2017	7th place	Grupo Especial	Xingu, O Clamor Que Vem Da Floresta	Cahê Rodrigues
2017	7th place	Grupo Especial	Xingu, O Clamor Que Vem Da Floresta	Arthur Franco
2018	8th place	Grupo Especial	Uma noite real no Museu Nacional	Cahê Rodrigues
2018	8th place	Grupo Especial	Uma noite real no Museu Nacional	Arthur Franco
2019	13th place	Grupo Especial	Me dá um dinheiro aí	Mário Monteiro; Kaká Monteiro
2019	13th place	Grupo Especial	Me dá um dinheiro aí	Arthur Franco
2020	Champion	Série A	Só Dá Lalá	Leandro Vieira
2020	Champion	Série A	Só Dá Lalá	Arthur Franco; Preto Jóia
2022	10th	Grupo Especial	Meninos, eu vivi... Onde canta o sabiá, onde cantam Dalva e Lamartine	Rosa Magalhães
2022	10th	Grupo Especial	Meninos, eu vivi... Onde canta o sabiá, onde cantam Dalva e Lamartine	Arthur Franco; Preto Jóia
2023	Champion	Grupo Especial	O aperreio do cabra que o excomungado tratou com má-querença e o santíssimo não deu guarida	Leandro Vieira
