= Rosa Magalhães =

Brazilian carnival designer (1947–2024)

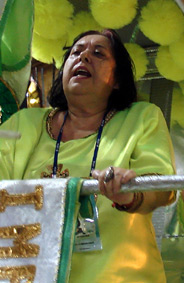
Magalhães parading in the school carnival 2008

Rosa Lúcia Benedetti Magalhães (8 January 1947 – 25 July 2024) was a Brazilian professor and artist. She is best known as the most successful carnival designer in Rio de Janeiro, with six championships won since 1984, when the Sambadrome Marquês de Sapucaí was built. Designing carnival parades since 1971, Magalhães liked telling historic events in her designs, such as the discovery of Brazil (2000), the life and creations of Hans Christian Andersen (2005), Don Quixote (2010), and the corruption scandal that led to the construction of the Versailles Palace in France (2017).

In 2008, Magalhães won an Emmy Award for Outstanding Achievement in Costume Design for her work as the artistic director of the Opening Ceremony of the Pan American Games in 2007. In addition, her Carnival designs have been exhibited in the Prague Quadrennial, as well as in Venice Biennale.

== Biography ==
Rosa Magalhães was the daughter of writer and academic Raimundo Magalhães Júnior and the playwright Lúcia Benedetti.

Graduated in painting from the School of Fine Arts in Rio de Janeiro and in scenography from the Theater School of Uni-Rio, she worked as a teacher of scenography and garment design in the School of Fine Arts, Federal University of Rio de Janeiro and the Bennett School of Architecture.

In 1971 Magalhães began to participate in Rio's carnival by cooperating with the group led by Fernando Pamplona and Arlindo Rodrigues, which worked in the samba school Salgueiro and had as its members Mary Augusta, Lycia Lacerda and Joaozinho Trinta among others. Later, Magalhães designed costumes for Beija-flor and then worked for Portela, where, paired with Lacerda, she created costumes and floats for scenarios developed by Hiram Araújo.

In 1982 Magalhães and Lacerda worked as carnival designers for the first time with Império Serrano, where they performed the famous (and winner) plot "Bumbum Paticumbum Prugurundum". In 1984, the duo was responsible for the carnival of Imperatriz. Despite great financial problems, the school won fourth place. For their work in that year, Magalhães and Lacerda received the Estandarte de Ouro award. In 1987 they worked together at Estácio on "Tititi of sapote" (o tititi do sapoti).

The year 1988 marked the first carnival in which Magalhães participated alone, again with Estacio, where she developed the theme "The Oxgoat" (O boi dá bode). The following year, continuing to work with the school, she presented: "One, two, beans and rice" (Um, dois, feijão com arroz). The next year she returned to Salgueiro and won the third place 1990 and was runner-up in 1991.

From 1992 to 2009, Magalhães worked as carnival designer for the samba school Imperatriz and helped the school to win five of its eight championships, including the first tri-championship in Sambadrome (1999, 2000 and 2001). Under Magalhães the school realized carnivals such as "The Marquis likes to swing!" (Marquês Que É Marquês Do Saçarico É Freguês! - runner-up in 1993), "Catherine de Medicis in the court of the Tupinambôs and Tabajères" (Catarina De Médicis Na Corte Dos Tupinambôs e Tabajeres, the champion in 1994), "Better a donkey to carry me around than a camel to knock me down ... there in Ceará" (Mais vale um jegue que me carregue do que um camelo que me derrube… lá no Ceará!, champion in 1995), "Leopoldina, Empress of Brazil" (Imperatriz Leopoldinense honrosamente apresenta: Leopoldina, a Imperatriz do Brasil, runner-up in 1996), "Mr Cabral was the one who, on 22 April, two months after Carnival, discovered Brazil" (Quem Descobriu O Brasil, Foi Seu Cabral, No Dia 22 De Abril, Dois Meses Depois Do Carnaval, champion in 2000), "Breazail" (Breazail, 5th place in 2004), "A crazy fabulistic confusion" (Uma delirante confusão fabulística, 4th place in 2005) and "John and the Marias" (João e Marias - 6th place in 2008), among others, establishing herself, with five titles won, as the greatest champion of the Sambadrome and one of the most important contemporary Brazilian artists.

In 2007 Magalhães created the opening show of the Pan American Games in Rio de Janeiro for which she would receive in the following year the most important award in the television world, the Emmy Award for best costumes.

In 2010, Magalhães left Imperatriz and worked as carnival designer for União da Ilha, keeping the school in the special group of Rio de Janeiro's samba schools parade, despite the modest 11th place in the contest. She continued to work with Vila Isabel.

In 2013, she won another carnival, this time by Vila Isabel, with the theme "A Vila Sings Brazil, world's breadbasket - water in the beans that came another" (A Vila canta o Brasil, celeiro do mundo - água no feijão que chegou mais um).

In Magalhães created the 2016 Summer Olympics closing ceremony. She died on 25 July 2024, at the age of 77.
