= Acadêmicos do Salgueiro =

Samba school in Rio de Janeiro

Salgueiro
- Full name: Grêmio Recreativo Escola de Samba Acadêmicos do Salgueiro
- Foundation: March 5, 1953; 73 years ago
- Blessing school: Mangueira
- Colors
- Symbol: Pandeiro, low tom, tamborim, cabasa and drum stick
- Location: Andaraí
- President: André Vaz
- Honorary president: Djalma Sabiá
Carnival staff
- Carnival producer: Alex de Souza
- Carnival singer: Emerson Dias; Quinho
- Carnival director: Alexandre Couto
- Harmony director: Jomar Casemiro
- Director of Battery: Guilherme Oliveira; Gustavo Oliveira
- Queen of Battery: Viviane Araújo
- Mestre-sala and Porta-Bandeira: Sidclei Santos; Marcella Alves
- Choreography: Sérgio Lobato

2020 presentation
- Motif: Shango
- Presentation order: 4th school on Sunday
- Tier: Special Group (1st tier)
- Result: 5th

Website
- salgueiro.com.br

Grêmio Recreativo Escola de Samba Acadêmicos do Salgueiro, popularly known simply as Salgueiro, is a popular samba school from Rio de Janeiro, Brazil.

== History ==
It was established on March 5, 1953 from the merger of Morro do Salgueiro's two samba schools called Azul e Branco do Salgueiro (Salgueiro's Blue and White) and Depois Eu Digo (I'll Say it Later), which then merged again with Unidos do Salgueiro. It first paraded in 1954 with the Romaria à Bahia samba. The school's motto is "Not better, nor worse, just a different school".

GRES Acadêmicos do Salgueiro is a nine-time champion of the Rio de Janeiro carnival, having won in 1960, 1963, 1965, 1969, 1971, 1974, 1975, 1993 and 2009. Its most famous sambas are "Festa Para Um Rei Negro" (Pega No Ganzê), "Bahia de Todos os Deuses", "Peguei Um Ita no Norte", "Explode Coração", "Chica da Silva", "Skindô! Skindô!" and "Tambor" (Drums).

The samba of 2019 in the Arquibancada of the Sambódromo took the musical and poetical heritage of the afro-brazilian roots as its principal issue. For their presentation for Carnival at the Sapucai, Salgueiro selected the orixá "Xango" as their theme (enredo) of 2019 and "Gaia - a vida em nossas mãos" in 2014.

In 2018, Kamilla Carvalho became the first transgender woman muse when Regina Celi, head of the school, invited her to dance.

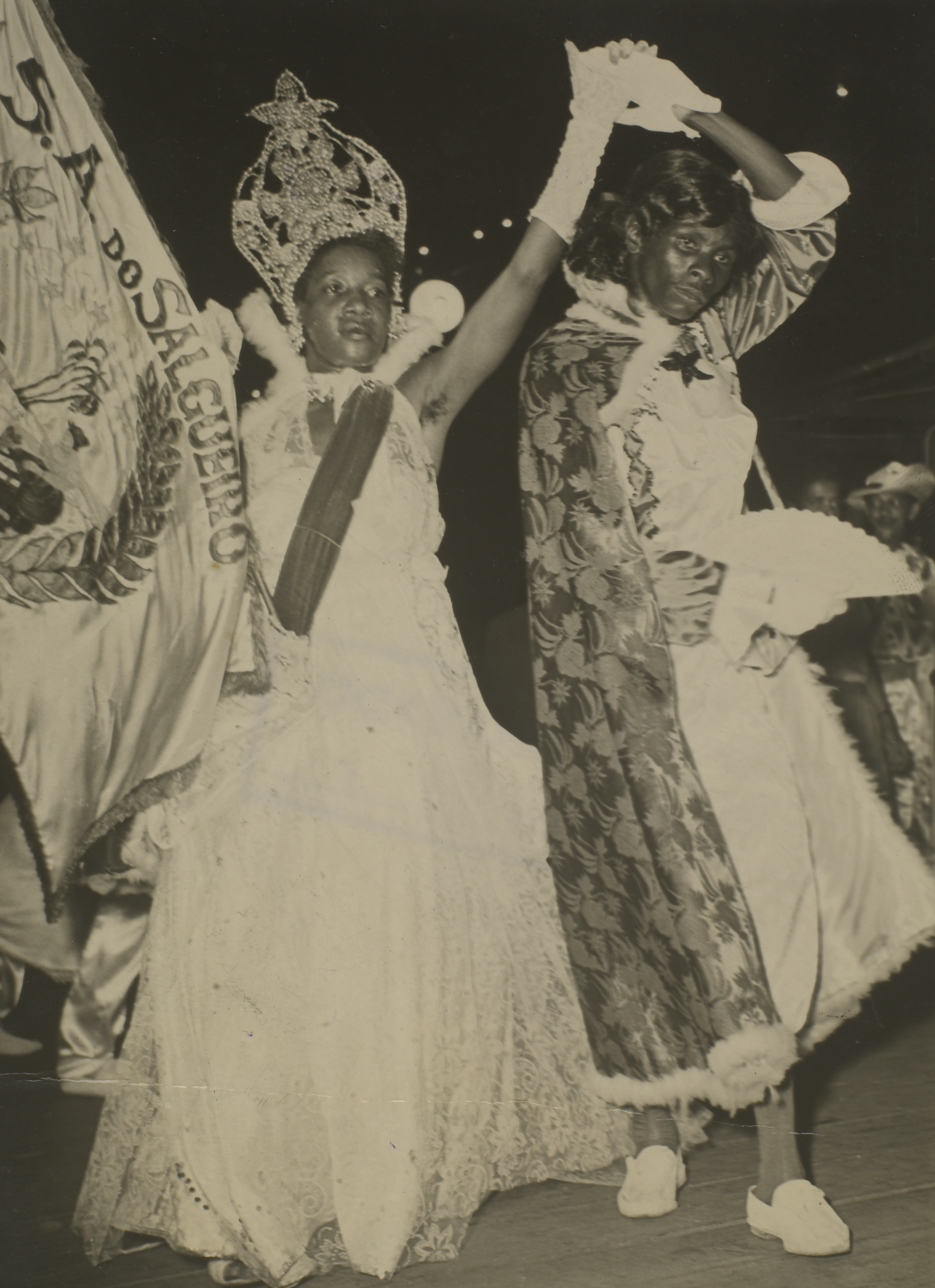
The Salgueiro Parade of 1955.

== Classifications ==
Year	Place	Division	Theme	Carnival Producers	Ref.
Year	Place	Division	Theme	Singers	Ref.
1954	3rd place	Grupo 1	Romaria à Bahia	Hildebrando de Moura	
1954	3rd place	Grupo 1	Romaria à Bahia	Djalma Sabiá	
1955	4th place	Grupo 1	Epopéia do samba	Hildebrando de Moura	
1955	4th place	Grupo 1	Epopéia do samba	Djalma Sabiá	
1956	4th place	Grupo 1	Brasil, fontes das artes	Hildebrando de Moura	
1956	4th place	Grupo 1	Brasil, fontes das artes	Djalma Sabiá	
1957	4th place	Grupo 1	Navio negreiro	Hildebrando de Moura	
1957	4th place	Grupo 1	Navio negreiro	Djalma Sabiá	
1958	4th place	Grupo 1	Um século e meio de progresso a serviço do Brasil	Hildebrando de Moura	
1958	4th place	Grupo 1	Um século e meio de progresso a serviço do Brasil	Raul Moreno	
1959	Vice Champion	Grupo 1	Viagem pitoresca através do Brasil - Debret	Marie Louise; Dirceu Néri	
1959	Vice Champion	Grupo 1	Viagem pitoresca através do Brasil - Debret	Noel Rosa de Oliveira	
1960	Champion	Grupo 1	Quilombo dos Palmares	Fernando Pamplona	
1960	Champion	Grupo 1	Quilombo dos Palmares	Noel Rosa de Oliveira	
1961	Vice Champion	Grupo 1	Vida e obra de Aleijadinho	Fernando Pamplona	
1961	Vice Champion	Grupo 1	Vida e obra de Aleijadinho	Noel Rosa de Oliveira	
1962	3rd place	Grupo 1	O Descobrimento do Brasil	Arlindo Rodrigues	
1962	3rd place	Grupo 1	O Descobrimento do Brasil	Noel Rosa de Oliveira	
1963	Champion	Grupo 1	Xica da Silva	Arlindo Rodrigues	
1963	Champion	Grupo 1	Xica da Silva	Noel Rosa de Oliveira	
1964	Vice Champion	Grupo 1	Chico Rei	Fernando Pamplona	
1964	Vice Champion	Grupo 1	Chico Rei	Noel Rosa de Oliveira	
1965	Champion	Grupo 1	História do carnaval carioca - Eneida	Fernando Pamplona; Arlindo Rodrigues	
1965	Champion	Grupo 1	História do carnaval carioca - Eneida	Jorge Goulart	
1966	5th place	Grupo 1	Os amores célebres do Brasil	Clóvis Bornay	
1966	5th place	Grupo 1	Os amores célebres do Brasil	Jorge Goulart	
1967	3rd place	Grupo 1	História da liberdade no Brasil	Fernando Pamplona	
1967	3rd place	Grupo 1	História da liberdade no Brasil	Jorge Goulart	
1968	3rd place	Grupo 1	Dona Beja, a feiticeira de Araxá	Fernando Pamplona	
1968	3rd place	Grupo 1	Dona Beja, a feiticeira de Araxá	Jorge Goulart	
1969	Champion	Grupo 1	Bahia de todos os deuses	Fernando Pamplona	
1969	Champion	Grupo 1	Bahia de todos os deuses	Elza Soares	
1970	Vice Champion	Grupo 1	Praça XI carioca da gema	Fernando Pamplona	
1970	Vice Champion	Grupo 1	Praça XI carioca da gema	Noel Rosa de Oliveira	
1971	Champion	Grupo 1	Festa para um rei negro	Fernando Pamplona	
1971	Champion	Grupo 1	Festa para um rei negro	Noel Rosa de Oliveira; Zuzuca	
1972	5th place	Grupo 1	Nossa madrinha, Mangueira querida	Fernando Pamplona	
1972	5th place	Grupo 1	Nossa madrinha, Mangueira querida	Noel Rosa de Oliveira; Zuzuca	
1973	3rd place	Grupo 1	Eneida, amor e fantasia	Maria Augusta; Joãosinho Trinta	
1973	3rd place	Grupo 1	Eneida, amor e fantasia	Alaíde Costa; Zé Di	
1974	Champion	Grupo 1	O Rei da França na ilha da assombração	Joãosinho Trinta	
1974	Champion	Grupo 1	O Rei da França na ilha da assombração	Laíla	
1975	Champion	Grupo 1	O segredo das minas do rei Salomão	Joãosinho Trinta	
1975	Champion	Grupo 1	O segredo das minas do rei Salomão	Noel Rosa de Oliveira; Sônia Santos	
1976	5th place	Grupo 1	Valongo	Edmundo Braga	
1976	5th place	Grupo 1	Valongo	Noel Rosa de Oliveira; Dinalva	
1977	4th place	Grupo 1	Do Cauim ao Efó, moça branca, branquinha	Fernando Pamplona	
1977	4th place	Grupo 1	Do Cauim ao Efó, moça branca, branquinha	Noel Rosa de Oliveira	
1978	6th place	Grupo 1	Do Yorubá à luz, an aurora dos deuses	Fernando Pamplona	
1978	6th place	Grupo 1	Do Yorubá à luz, an aurora dos deuses	Rico Medeiros	
1979	6th place	Grupo 1A	O Reino encantado da mãe natureza contra o rei do mal	Ivan Jorge	
1979	6th place	Grupo 1A	O Reino encantado da mãe natureza contra o rei do mal	Rico Medeiros	
1980	3rd place	Group 1A	O bailar dos ventos, relampejou, mas não choveu	Ney Ayan; Jorge Nascimento	
1980	3rd place	Group 1A	O bailar dos ventos, relampejou, mas não choveu	Rico Medeiros	
1981	5th place	Grupo 1A	Rio de Janeiro	Geraldo Sobreira	
1981	5th place	Grupo 1A	Rio de Janeiro	Rico Medeiros	
1982	8th place	Grupo 1A	No reino do faz de conta	José Félix	
1982	8th place	Grupo 1A	No reino do faz de conta	Zédi	
1983	8th place	Grupo 1A	Traços e troças	Augusto Vannucci; Lan	
1983	8th place	Grupo 1A	Traços e troças	Rico Medeiros	
1984	4th place	Grupo 1A	Skindô, Skindô	Arlindo Rodrigues	
1984	4th place	Grupo 1A	Skindô, Skindô	David Corrêa	
1985	6th place	Grupo 1A	Anos Trinta, Vento Sul - Vargas	Edmundo Braga; Paulino Espírito Santo	
1985	6th place	Grupo 1A	Anos Trinta, Vento Sul - Vargas	Rico Medeiros	
1986	6th place	Grupo 1A	Tem que se Tirar da Cabeça Aquilo que Não se Tem no Bolso - Tributo a Fernando Pamplona	Ney Ayam; Mário Monteiro; Yarema Ostrower	
1986	6th place	Grupo 1A	Tem que se Tirar da Cabeça Aquilo que Não se Tem no Bolso - Tributo a Fernando Pamplona	Rico Medeiros	
1987	5th place	Grupo 1	E por que não?	Renato Lage; Lílian Rabello	
1987	5th place	Grupo 1	E por que não?	Rixxah	
1988	4th place	Grupo 1	Em Busca do Ouro	Mário Monteiro; Chico Spinoza	
1988	4th place	Grupo 1	Em Busca do Ouro	Rixxah	
1989	5th place	Grupo 1	Templo Negro em Tempo de Consciência Negra	Luiz Fernando Reis; Flávio Tavares	
1989	5th place	Grupo 1	Templo Negro em Tempo de Consciência Negra	Rixxah; Rico Medeiros	
1990	3rd place	Grupo Especial	Sou Amigo do Rei	Rosa Magalhães	
1990	3rd place	Grupo Especial	Sou Amigo do Rei	Rico Medeiros	
1991	Vice Champion	Grupo Especial	Me Masso se Não Passo pela Rua do Ouvidor	Rosa Magalhães	
1991	Vice Champion	Grupo Especial	Me Masso se Não Passo pela Rua do Ouvidor	Quinho	
1992	4th place	Grupo Especial	O Negro que Virou Ouro nas Terras do Salgueiro	Mário Borriello	
1992	4th place	Grupo Especial	O Negro que Virou Ouro nas Terras do Salgueiro	Quinho	
1993	Champion	Grupo Especial	Peguei um Ita no Norte	Mário Borriello	
1993	Champion	Grupo Especial	Peguei um Ita no Norte	Quinho	
1994	Vice Champion	Grupo Especial	Rio de Lá para Cá	Roberto Szaniecki	
1994	Vice Champion	Grupo Especial	Rio de Lá para Cá	Quinzinho	
1995	5th place	Grupo Especial	O Caso do por Acaso	Roberto Szaniecki	
1995	5th place	Grupo Especial	O Caso do por Acaso	Quinho	
1996	5th place	Grupo Especial	Anarquistas Sim, Mas Nem Todos	Fábio Borges	
1996	5th place	Grupo Especial	Anarquistas Sim, Mas Nem Todos	Quinho	
1997	7th place	Grupo Especial	De Poeta, Carnavalesco e Louco… Todo Mundo tem um Pouco	Mário Borriello	
1997	7th place	Grupo Especial	De Poeta, Carnavalesco e Louco… Todo Mundo tem um Pouco	Quinho	
1998	7th place	Grupo Especial	Parintins, A Ilha do boi-bumbá: Garantido X Caprichoso, Caprichoso X Garantido	Mário Borriello	
1998	7th place	Grupo Especial	Parintins, A Ilha do boi-bumbá: Garantido X Caprichoso, Caprichoso X Garantido	Quinho	
1999	5th place	Grupo Especial	Salgueiro é Sol e Sal nos Quatrocentos Anos de Natal	Mauro Quintaes	
1999	5th place	Grupo Especial	Salgueiro é Sol e Sal nos Quatrocentos Anos de Natal	Quinho	
2000	6th place	Grupo Especial	Sou Rei, Sou Salgueiro, meu Reinado é Brasileiro	Mauro Quintaes	
2000	6th place	Grupo Especial	Sou Rei, Sou Salgueiro, meu Reinado é Brasileiro	Wander Pires	
2001	4th place	Grupo Especial	Salgueiro no mar de Xarayés, é Pantanal, é Carnaval	Mauro Quintaes	
2001	4th place	Grupo Especial	Salgueiro no mar de Xarayés, é Pantanal, é Carnaval	Nêgo	
2002	6th place	Grupo Especial	Asas de um sonho, Viajando com o Salgueiro, O orgulho de ser brasileiro	Mauro Quintaes	
2002	6th place	Grupo Especial	Asas de um sonho, Viajando com o Salgueiro, O orgulho de ser brasileiro	Nêgo	
2003	7th place	Grupo Especial	Salgueiro, Minha Paixão, Minha Raiz - 50 Anos de Glórias	Renato Lage; Márcia Lage	
2003	7th place	Grupo Especial	Salgueiro, Minha Paixão, Minha Raiz - 50 Anos de Glórias	Quinho	
2004	6th place	Grupo Especial	A Cana que aqui se planta, tudo dá… Até energia! Álcool – o combustível do futuro	Renato Lage; Márcia Lage	
2004	6th place	Grupo Especial	A Cana que aqui se planta, tudo dá… Até energia! Álcool – o combustível do futuro	Quinho	
2005	5th place	Grupo Especial	Do fogo que ilumina a vida, Salgueiro é chama que não se apaga	Renato Lage; Márcia Lage	
2005	5th place	Grupo Especial	Do fogo que ilumina a vida, Salgueiro é chama que não se apaga	Quinho	
2006	11th place	Grupo Especial	Microcosmos: O que os olhos não vêem o coração sente	Renato Lage; Márcia Lage	
2006	11th place	Grupo Especial	Microcosmos: O que os olhos não vêem o coração sente	Quinho	
2007	7th place	Grupo Especial	Candaces	Renato Lage; Márcia Lage	
2007	7th place	Grupo Especial	Candaces	Quinho	
2008	Vice Champion	Grupo Especial	O Rio de Janeiro continua sendo…	Renato Lage; Márcia Lage	
2008	Vice Champion	Grupo Especial	O Rio de Janeiro continua sendo…	Quinho	
2009	Champion	Grupo Especial	Tambor	Renato Lage	
2009	Champion	Grupo Especial	Tambor	Quinho	
2010	5th place	Grupo Especial	Histórias sem fim	Renato Lage	
2010	5th place	Grupo Especial	Histórias sem fim	Quinho	
2011	5th place	Grupo Especial	Salgueiro Apresenta: O Rio no Cinema!	Renato Lage; Márcia Lage	
2011	5th place	Grupo Especial	Salgueiro Apresenta: O Rio no Cinema!	Quinho; Serginho do Porto; Leonardo Bessa	
2012	Vice Champion	Grupo Especial	Cordel Branco e Encarnado	Renato Lage; Márcia Lage	
2012	Vice Champion	Grupo Especial	Cordel Branco e Encarnado	Quinho; Serginho do Porto; Leonardo Bessa	
2013	5th place	Grupo Especial	Fama	Renato Lage; Márcia Lage	
2013	5th place	Grupo Especial	Fama	Quinho; Serginho do Porto; Leonardo Bessa	
2014	Vice Champion	Grupo Especial	Gaia - a vida em nossas mãos	Renato Lage; Márcia Lage	
2014	Vice Champion	Grupo Especial	Gaia - a vida em nossas mãos	Quinho; Serginho do Porto; Leonardo Bessa	
2015	Vice Champion	Grupo Especial	Do fundo do quintal, saberes e sabores na Sapucaí	Renato Lage; Márcia Lage	
2015	Vice Champion	Grupo Especial	Do fundo do quintal, saberes e sabores na Sapucaí	Quinho; Serginho do Porto; Leonardo Bessa	
2016	4th place	Grupo Especial	A Ópera dos Malandros	Renato Lage; Márcia Lage	
2016	4th place	Grupo Especial	A Ópera dos Malandros	Serginho do Porto; Leonardo Bessa	
2017	3rd place	Grupo Especial	A divina comédia do Carnaval	Renato Lage; Márcia Lage	
2017	3rd place	Grupo Especial	A divina comédia do Carnaval	Serginho do Porto; Leonardo Bessa	
2018	3rd place	Grupo Especial	Senhoras do ventre do mundo	Alex de Souza	
2018	3rd place	Grupo Especial	Senhoras do ventre do mundo	Leonardo Bessa; Hudson Luiz; Tuninho Júnior	
2019	5th place	Grupo Especial	Xangô	Alex de Souza	
2019	5th place	Grupo Especial	Xangô	Emerson Dias; Quinho	
2020	5th place	Grupo Especial	O Rei negro do picadeiro	Alex de Souza	
2020	5th place	Grupo Especial	O Rei negro do picadeiro	Emerson Dias; Quinho	
2022	6th place	Grupo Especial	Resistência	Alex de Souza	
2022	6th place	Grupo Especial	Resistência	Emerson Dias; Quinho	
