= Império Serrano =

Samba School

- Foundation: 23 March 1947; 79 years ago

The Grêmio Recreativo Escola de Samba Império Serrano is a samba school of the city of Rio de Janeiro, that was created on March 23 of 1947 after a disagreement of the extinct samba school Prazer da Serrinha. It was nine times champion of the Carnaval and can be considered one of the most traditional schools of the samba of the city. One of the principal vainglories of its members is the open democracy of the school, established in the school's foundation. Its history is normally confused with the history of the Morro da Serrinha, despite its headquarters being in Avenida Ministro Edgard Romero near the Estação Mercadão de Madureira, but in the same neighborhood: Madureira.

The Ala de Compositores (Ala of the Composers) of Império is one of the most respected, having in its history people such as Silas de Oliveira, Mano Décio, Aniceto do Império, Molequinho, Dona Ivone Lara (first woman to participate in the ala of the composers of the samba schools), Beto sem Braço, Aluizio Machado, and Arlindo Cruz.

The school's history is crowned by splendid sambas, true classics of the samba-enredo such as Aquarela Brasileira ("Brazilian Aquarelle") (1964 and 2004), Exaltação a Tiradentes ("Exaltation to Tiradentes") (1949), Os Cinco Bailes da História do Rio ("The Five Balls of the History of Rio") (1965), Heróis da Liberdade ("Liberty Heroes") (1969), Bumbum paticumbum Prugurundum (1982), among others.

In 1982, the singer Clara Nunes recorded the samba Serrinha, in homage to Mauro Duarte and Paulo César Pinheiro.

In the 1990s, the school confronted serious political problems that resulted in three downgradings (1991, 1997, and 1999).

The school returned to the elite of the Carnaval in 2001, though struggling to remain in the group. That year, the school brought the samba of Arlindo Cruz, Maurição, Carlos Sena, and Elmo Caetano, and it was considered by the reviewers as the most beautiful of the year. The samba narrated the story of the Resistance, nickname of the Syndicate of the Stevedores of Rio de Janeiro, with which many of the school's members were connected.

In 2004, the Império repeated the samba-enredo Aquarela do Brasil, considered one of the most beautiful sambas-enredo in history, and despite financial problems and internal disputes, received a Sambadrome standing ovation. In 2007, the school fell again to the Grupo de Acesso, but won the title in 2017, resulting in a 2018 return to the Special Group.

== Classifications ==
Year	Place	Division	Plot	Carnivals Producers
Year	Place	Division	Plot	Singers
1948	Champion	FBES	Homenagem a Antônio Castro Alves	Carnival Commission
1948	Champion	FBES	Homenagem a Antônio Castro Alves	Vozes Imperianas
1949	Champion	FBES	Exaltação à Tiradentes	Carnival Commission
1949	Champion	FBES	Exaltação à Tiradentes	Vozes Imperianas
1950	Champion	FBES	Batalha Naval do Riachuelo	Carnival Commission
1950	Champion	FBES	Batalha Naval do Riachuelo	Vozes Imperianas
1951	Champion	FBES	Sessenta e um anos de República	Carnival Commission
1951	Champion	FBES	Sessenta e um anos de República	Vozes Imperianas
1952	There was no trial		Ana Néri ou Homenagem à Medicina Brasileira	Carnival Commission
1952	There was no trial		Ana Néri ou Homenagem à Medicina Brasileira	Vozes Imperianas
1953	Vice Champion	Group 1	O Último Baile da Côrte Imperial	Carnival Commission
1953	Vice Champion	Group 1	O Último Baile da Côrte Imperial	Vozes Imperianas
1954	Vice Champion	Grupo 1	O Guarani	Carnival Commission
1954	Vice Champion	Grupo 1	O Guarani	Vozes Imperianas
1955	Champion	Grupo 1	Exaltação à Duque de Caxias	Carnival Commission
1955	Champion	Grupo 1	Exaltação à Duque de Caxias	Vozes Imperianas
1956	Champion	Grupo 1	Exaltação à Duque de Caxias	Carnival Commission
1956	Champion	Grupo 1	Exaltação à Duque de Caxias	Vozes Imperianas
1957	Vice Champion	Grupo 1	Exaltação à Dom João VI	Carnival Commission
1957	Vice Champion	Grupo 1	Exaltação à Dom João VI	Vozes Imperianas
1958	Vice Champion	Grupo 1	Exaltação à Bárbara Heliodora	Carnival Commission
1958	Vice Champion	Grupo 1	Exaltação à Bárbara Heliodora	Vozes Imperianas
1959	3rd place	Grupo 1	Brasil Holandês	Carnival Commission
1959	3rd place	Grupo 1	Brasil Holandês	Vozes Imperianas
1960	Champion	Grupo 1	Medalhas e Brasões	Carnival Commission
1960	Champion	Grupo 1	Medalhas e Brasões	Vozes Imperianas
1961	4th place	Grupo 1	Movimentos Revolucionários do Brasil	Carnival Commission
1961	4th place	Grupo 1	Movimentos Revolucionários do Brasil	Vozes Imperianas
1962	Vice Champion	Grupo 1	Rio dos Vice-Reis	Carnival Commission
1962	Vice Champion	Grupo 1	Rio dos Vice-Reis	Vozes Imperianas
1963	3rd place	Grupo 1	Rio Ontem e Hoje	Carnival Commission
1963	3rd place	Grupo 1	Rio Ontem e Hoje	Vozes Imperianas
1964	4th place	Grupo 1	Aquarela Brasileira	Carnival Commission
1964	4th place	Grupo 1	Aquarela Brasileira	Vozes Imperianas
1965	Vice Champion	Group 1	Cinco Bailes da História do Rio	Carnival Commission
1965	Vice Champion	Group 1	Cinco Bailes da História do Rio	Vozes Imperianas
1966	3rd place	Grupo 1	Glória e Graça da Bahia	Antônio Carbonelli; Paulo Freitas; Armando Iglesias
1966	3rd place	Grupo 1	Glória e Graça da Bahia	Abílio Martins
1967	Vice Champion	Group 1	São Paulo, Chapadão de Glórias	Antônio Carbonelli; Paulo Freitas; Armando Iglesias
1967	Vice Champion	Group 1	São Paulo, Chapadão de Glórias	Silas de Andrade
1968	Vice Champion	Group 1	Pernambuco, Leão do Norte	João Bittencourt; Castelo Branco
1968	Vice Champion	Group 1	Pernambuco, Leão do Norte	Silas de Andrade
1969	4th place	Grupo 1	Heróis da Liberdade	Acir Pimentel; Swayne Moreira
1969	4th place	Grupo 1	Heróis da Liberdade	Silas de Andrade
1970	8th place	Grupo 1	Arte em Tom Maior: Debret	Acir Pimentel; Swayne Moreira
1970	8th place	Grupo 1	Arte em Tom Maior: Debret	Silas de Andrade
1971	3rd place	Grupo 1	Nordeste: Seu Povo, Seu Canto, Sua Glória	Fernando Pinto
1971	3rd place	Grupo 1	Nordeste: Seu Povo, Seu Canto, Sua Glória	Roberto Ribeiro
1972	Champion	Grupo 1	Alô Alô, Taí, Carmem Miranda	Fernando Pinto
1972	Champion	Grupo 1	Alô Alô, Taí, Carmem Miranda	Damasceno
1973	Vice Champion	Grupo 1	Viagem Encantada Pindorama Adentro	Fernando Pinto
1973	Vice Champion	Grupo 1	Viagem Encantada Pindorama Adentro	Marlene
1974	3rd place	Grupo 1	Dona Santa, Rainha do Maracatu	Fernando Pinto
1974	3rd place	Grupo 1	Dona Santa, Rainha do Maracatu	Marlene
1975	3rd place	Grupo 1	Zaquia Jorge, Vedete do Subúrbio, Estrela de Madureira	Fernando Pinto
1975	3rd place	Grupo 1	Zaquia Jorge, Vedete do Subúrbio, Estrela de Madureira	Roberto Ribeiro
1976	7th place	Grupo 1	A Lenda das Sereias, Rainhas do Mar	Fernando Pinto
1976	7th place	Grupo 1	A Lenda das Sereias, Rainhas do Mar	Roberto Ribeiro
1977	6th place	Grupo 1	Brasil, Berço dos Imigrantes	Moacyr Rodrigues; Lielzo Azambuja
1977	6th place	Grupo 1	Brasil, Berço dos Imigrantes	Roberto Ribeiro
1978	7th place	Grupo 1	Oscarito, Carnaval e Samba - Uma Chanchada no Asfalto	Fernando Pinto
1978	7th place	Grupo 1	Oscarito, Carnaval e Samba - Uma Chanchada no Asfalto	Roberto Ribeiro
1979	Vice Champion	Grupo 1B	Municipal Maravilhoso, 70 Anos de Glórias	Evandro de Castro Lima
1979	Vice Champion	Grupo 1B	Municipal Maravilhoso, 70 Anos de Glórias	Roberto Ribeiro
1980	5th place	Grupo 1A	Império das Ilusões - Atlântida, Eldorado, Sonho e Aventura	Mauro Almeida; Ubiratan de Assis; Evandro do Rosário; José Eugênio
1980	5th place	Grupo 1A	Império das Ilusões - Atlântida, Eldorado, Sonho e Aventura	Roberto Ribeiro
1981	10th place	Grupo 1A	Na Terra do Pau-Brasil Nem Tudo Caminha Viu	Ricardo Aquino; Luís Fernandes
1981	10th place	Grupo 1A	Na Terra do Pau-Brasil Nem Tudo Caminha Viu	Roberto Ribeiro; Abílio Martins
1982	Champion	Grupo 1A	Bumbum Praticumbum Prugurundum	Rosa Magalhães; Lícia Lacerda
1982	Champion	Grupo 1A	Bumbum Praticumbum Prugurundum	Quinzinho
1983	3rd place	Grupo 1A	Mãe Baiana Mãe	Renato Lage
1983	3rd place	Grupo 1A	Mãe Baiana Mãe	Quinzinho
1984	Vice Champion	Grupo 1A	Foi malandro é	Renato Lage
1984	Vice Champion	Grupo 1A	Foi malandro é	Ney Vianna
1985	7th place	Grupo 1A	Samba, suor e cerveja, o combustível da ilusão	Renato Lage; Lílian Rabelo
1985	7th place	Grupo 1A	Samba, suor e cerveja, o combustível da ilusão	Quinzinho
1986	3rd place	Grupo 1A	Eu quero	Renato Lage; Lílian Rabelo
1986	3rd place	Grupo 1A	Eu quero	Quinzinho
1987	3rd place	Grupo 1	Com a boca no mundo, quem não se comunica se trumbica	Ney Ayan
1987	3rd place	Grupo 1	Com a boca no mundo, quem não se comunica se trumbica	Quinzinho
1988	7th place	Grupo 1	Pára com isso, dá cá o meu	Ney Ayan
1988	7th place	Grupo 1	Pára com isso, dá cá o meu	Quinzinho
1989	10th place	Grupo 1	Jorge Amado, Axé Brasil	Oswaldo Jardim
1989	10th place	Grupo 1	Jorge Amado, Axé Brasil	Silvinho da Portela
1990	11th place	Grupo Especial	Histórias da nossa história - Uma lenda, um invasor, um bandeirante	Gil Ricon
1990	11th place	Grupo Especial	Histórias da nossa história - Uma lenda, um invasor, um bandeirante	Tico do Gato
1991	15th place	Grupo Especial	É por aí que eu vou	Ney Ayan
1991	15th place	Grupo Especial	É por aí que eu vou	Tico do Gato
1992	3rd place	Grupo A	Fala Serrinha - a voz do samba sou eu mesmo sim senhor	Paulo Resende; Wanderley Silva; Luiz Rangel
1992	3rd place	Grupo A	Fala Serrinha - a voz do samba sou eu mesmo sim senhor	Roger da Fazenda
1993	Vice Champion	Grupo A	Império Serrano, um ato de amor	Cid Camilo; Sanclair Boiron
1993	Vice Champion	Grupo A	Império Serrano, um ato de amor	Roger da Fazenda
1994	16th place	Grupo Especial	Uma festa brasileira	Cid Camilo; Sanclair Boiron
1994	16th place	Grupo Especial	Uma festa brasileira	Roger da Fazenda
1995	15th place	Grupo Especial	O tempo não pára	Lílian Rabello
1995	15th place	Grupo Especial	O tempo não pára	Roger da Fazenda
1996	6th place	Grupo Especial	E verás que um filho teu não foge à luta	Ernesto Nascimento; Actir Gonçalves
1996	6th place	Grupo Especial	E verás que um filho teu não foge à luta	Jorginho do Império
1997	15th place	Grupo Especial	O mundo dos sonhos de Beto Carrero	Jerônimo Guimarães
1997	15th place	Grupo Especial	O mundo dos sonhos de Beto Carrero	Jorginho do Império
1998	Champion	Grupo A	Sou ouro negro da Mãe África	João Luiz de Moura
1998	Champion	Grupo A	Sou ouro negro da Mãe África	Carlinhos da Paz
1999	13th place	Grupo Especial	Uma Rua Chamada Brasil	Mário Borriello
1999	13th place	Grupo Especial	Uma Rua Chamada Brasil	Jorginho do Império
2000	Champion	Grupo A	Canhões de Guararapes	Sylvio Cunha
2000	Champion	Grupo A	Canhões de Guararapes	Carlinhos da Paz
2001	11th place	Grupo Especial	O Rio corre pro mar	Sylvio Cunha; Ernesto Nascimento; Actir Gonçalves
2001	11th place	Grupo Especial	Carlinhos da Paz	Sylvio Cunha; Ernesto Nascimento; Actir Gonçalves
2002	9th place	Grupo Especial	Aclamação e coroação do Imperador da Pedra do Reino - Ariano Suassuna	Ernesto Nascimento
2002	9th place	Grupo Especial	Aclamação e coroação do Imperador da Pedra do Reino - Ariano Suassuna	Carlinhos da Paz
2003	12th place	Grupo Especial	E onde houver trevas... que se faça a luz!	Ernesto Nascimento
2003	12th place	Grupo Especial	E onde houver trevas... que se faça a luz!	Wantuir
2004	9th place	Grupo Especial	Aquarela Brasileira	Ilvamar Magalhães
2004	9th place	Grupo Especial	Aquarela Brasileira	Nêgo
2005	12th place	Grupo Especial	Um grito que ecoa no ar.Homem/Natureza - o equilibrio perfeito	Ilvamar Magalhães
2005	12th place	Grupo Especial	Um grito que ecoa no ar.Homem/Natureza - o equilibrio perfeito	Nêgo
2006	8th place	Grupo Especial	O Império do Divino	Paulo Menezes
2006	8th place	Grupo Especial	O Império do Divino	Nêgo
2007	12th place	Grupo Especial	Ser Diferente é Normal - O Império Serrano Faz a Diferença no Carnaval	Jack Vasconcelos
2007	12th place	Grupo Especial	Ser Diferente é Normal - O Império Serrano Faz a Diferença no Carnaval	Nêgo
2008	Champion	Grupo A	Taí, eu fiz tudo para você gostar de mim	Renato Lage; Márcia Lage
2008	Champion	Grupo A	Taí, eu fiz tudo para você gostar de mim	Gonzaguinha
2009	12th place	Grupo Especial	Lendas das sereias, mistérios do mar	Márcia Lage
2009	12th place	Grupo Especial	Lendas das sereias, mistérios do mar	Nêgo
2010	6th place	Grupo A	João das ruas do Rio	Rosa Magalhães; Andréa Vieira; Mauro Leite
2010	6th place	Grupo A	João das ruas do Rio	Bira Silva
2011	6th place	Grupo A	A Benção, Vinícius	Alexandre Colla
2011	6th place	Grupo A	A Benção, Vinícius	Carlinhos da Paz; Vítor Cunha
2012	2nd place	Grupo A	Dona Ivone Lara: O enredo do Meu samba	Mauro Quintaes
2012	2nd place	Grupo A	Dona Ivone Lara: O enredo do Meu samba	Tiãozinho Cruz; Freddy Vianna
2013	3rd place	Série A	Caxambu - O milagre das águas na fonte do samba	Mauro Quintaes
2013	3rd place	Série A	Caxambu - O milagre das águas na fonte do samba	Freddy Vianna
2014	6th place	Série A	Angra com os Reis	Eduardo Gonçalves
2014	6th place	Série A	Angra com os Reis	Clóvis Pê
2015	3rd place	Série A	Poema aos Peregrinos da Fé	Severo Luzardo
2015	3rd place	Série A	Poema aos Peregrinos da Fé	Bico Doce
2016	4th place	Série A	Silas canta Serrinha	Severo Luzardo
2016	4th place	Série A	Silas canta Serrinha	Pixulé
2017	Champion	Série A	Meu quintal é maior do que o mundo	Marcus Ferreira
2017	Champion	Série A	Meu quintal é maior do que o mundo	Marquinho Art'Samba
2018	13th place	Grupo Especial	O Império do Samba na Rota da China	Fábio Ricardo
2018	13th place	Grupo Especial	O Império do Samba na Rota da China	Marquinho Art'Samba
2019	14th place	Grupo Especial	O Que é, O Que é?	Paulo Menezes
2019	14th place	Grupo Especial	O Que é, O Que é?	Silas Leléu; Anderson Paz
2020	9th place	Série A	Lugar de mulher é onde ela quiser!	Júnior Pernambucano
2020	9th place	Série A	Lugar de mulher é onde ela quiser!	Silas Leléu
2022	Champion	Série Ouro	Mangangá	Leandro Vieira
2022	Champion	Série Ouro	Mangangá	Nêgo; Igor Vianna
2023		Grupo Especial		Alex de Souza
2023		Grupo Especial		Igor Vianna; Ito Melodia
