= LIESA =

Principal association that organizes the Rio Carnival

Liga Independente das Escolas de Samba do Rio de Janeiro
- Abbreviation: LIESA
- Formation: 1984; 42 years ago
- Founders: AESCRJ members
- Location: Rio de Janeiro, Brazil
- President: Gabriel David
- Website: Official website

Liga Independente das Escolas de Samba do Rio de Janeiro (English: Independent League of the Samba Schools of Rio de Janeiro), commonly known by the acronym LIESA, is the principal association that organizes the Carnival of the city of Rio de Janeiro.

== History ==
Disgruntled with the official league, the AESCRJ representatives of ten samba schools, led by bicheiros, helped found the LIESA in 1984. They were not in agreement with the state of things in the AESCRJ, where they were a minority and always defeated in deliberations although they invested the money. Each attempt to improve the commercial success of the Carnival spectacle was being rejected. They formed an independent league, which eventually took over the organisation of the parades of the Rio Carnival. The bicheiro Castor de Andrade was the first president of LIESA.

Each year, the schools promoted by the Grupo de Acesso to the top league of the Special Group become affiliated to LIESA. All other schools are affiliated with the AESCRJ.

In 2007, LIESA experienced one of the worst crises of its history, with the arrest of various of its leaders, such as Capitão Guimarães and Anísio Abraão David, during Operation Hurricane by the Brazilian Federal Police. An inquiry was installed in the council of the city of Rio de Janeiro to investigate the accusations of corruption.

One of the charges was that underworld figures fixed the results of Rio de Janeiro's 2007 carnival parade. Press reports suggest that Anísio Abraão David, the honorary president of Beija-Flor that won the competition, used bribes and a hitman to buy and intimidate members of the carnival jury. According to extracts from a federal police report, "some individuals who worked as carnival jurors and refused to accept benefits from Anisio were threatened or had their relatives threatened with death if the Beija-Flor school did not win the 2007 carnival".

On July 14, 2007, a new administration was elected, culminating in the return of Jorge Castanheira as president of the league.

After the intervention of Rede Globo where understood that the spectacle, was already tiring. The Liesa in plenary approved the change of time of parade which now becomes 75 minutes, as has been discussed previously and also a decrease in the number of floats, which now becomes six. in the 2026 Carnival, the parade of children's samba schools, previously organized by ASM-RIO, will be transferred to LIESA.

== Presidents ==
Name	Took office	Left office	References
Castor de Andrade	1984	1985	
Anísio Abraão David	1985	1987	
Capitão Guimarães	1987	1993	
Paulo de Almeida	1993	1995	
Jorge Castanheira	1995	1997	
Djalma Arruda	1997	1998	
Luizinho Drummond	1998	2001	
Capitão Guimarães	2001	2007	
Jorge Castanheira	2007	2021	
Jorge Perlingeiro	2021	2024	
Gabriel David	2024	incumbent	

== First Division Champions ==
- 1932 - Estação Primeira de Mangueira (1)
- 1933 - Estação Primeira de Mangueira (2)
- 1934 - Estação Primeira de Mangueira (3)
- 1934 - Recreio de Ramos (1)
- 1935 - Portela (1)
- 1936 - Unidos da Tijuca (1)
- 1937 - Vizinha Faladeira (1)
- 1939 - Portela (2)
- 1940 - Estação Primeira de Mangueira (4)
- 1941 - Portela (3)
- 1942 - Portela (4)
- 1943 - Portela (5)
- 1944 - Portela (6)
- 1945 - Portela (7)
- 1946 - Portela (8)
- 1947 - Portela (9)
- 1948 - Império Serrano (1)
- 1949 - Império Serrano (2)
- 1949 - Estação Primeira de Mangueira (5)
- 1950 - Império Serrano (3)
- 1950 - Estação Primeira de Mangueira (6)
- 1950 - Prazer de Serrinha (1)
- 1950 - Unidos da Capela (1)
- 1951 - Império Serrano (4)
- 1951 - Portela (10)
- 1953 - Portela (11)
- 1954 - Estação Primeira de Mangueira (7)
- 1955 - Império Serrano (5)
- 1956 - Império Serrano (6)
- 1957 - Portela (12)
- 1958 - Portela (13)
- 1959 - Portela (14)
- 1960 - Portela (15)
- 1960 - Estação Primeira de Mangueira (8)
- 1960 - Acadêmicos do Salgueiro (1)
- 1960 - Unidos da Capela (2)
- 1960 - Império Serrano (7)
- 1961 - Estação Primeira de Mangueira (9)
- 1962 - Portela (16)
- 1963 - Acadêmicos do Salgueiro (2)
- 1964 - Portela (17)
- 1965 - Acadêmicos do Salgueiro (3)
- 1966 - Portela (18)
- 1967 - Estação Primeira de Mangueira (10)
- 1968 - Estação Primeira de Mangueira (11)
- 1969 - Acadêmicos do Salgueiro (4)
- 1970 - Portela (19)
- 1971 - Acadêmicos do Salgueiro (5)
- 1972 - Império Serrano (8)
- 1973 - Mangueira (13)
- 1974 - Acadêmicos do Salgueiro (6)
- 1975 - Acadêmicos do Salgueiro (7)
- 1976 - Beija-Flor (1)
- 1977 - Beija-Flor (2)
- 1978 - Beija-Flor (3)
- 1979 - Mocidade Independente de Padre Miguel (1)
- 1980 - Imperatriz Leopoldinense (1)
- 1980 - Beija-Flor (4)
- 1980 - Portela (20)
- 1981 - Imperatriz Leopoldinense (2)
- 1982 - Império Serrano (9)
- 1983 - Beija-Flor (5)
- 1984 - Estação Primeira de Mangueira (14)
- 1984 - Portela (21)
- 1984 - Estação Primeira de Mangueira (15)
- 1985 - Mocidade Independente de Padre Miguel (2)
- 1986 - Estação Primeira de Mangueira (16)
- 1987 - Estação Primeira de Mangueira (17)
- 1988 - Unidos de Vila Isabel (1)
- 1989 - Imperatriz Leopoldinense (3)
- 1990 - Mocidade Independente de Padre Miguel (3)
- 1991 - Mocidade Independente de Padre Miguel (4)
- 1992 - Estácio de Sá (1)
- 1993 - Acadêmicos do Salgueiro (8)
- 1994 - Imperatriz Leopoldinense (4)
- 1995 - Imperatriz Leopoldinense (5)
- 1996 - Mocidade Independente de Padre Miguel (5)
- 1997 - Unidos do Viradouro (1)
- 1998 - Estação Primeira de Mangueira (17)
- 1998 - Beija-Flor (6)
- 1999 - Imperatriz Leopoldinense (6)
- 2000 - Imperatriz Leopoldinense (7)
- 2001 - Imperatriz Leopoldinense (8)
- 2002 - Estação Primeira de Mangueira (18)
- 2003 - Beija-Flor (7)
- 2004 - Beija-Flor (8)
- 2005 - Beija-Flor (9)
- 2006 - Unidos de Vila Isabel (2)
- 2007 - Beija-Flor (10)
- 2008 - Beija-Flor (11)
- 2009 - Acadêmicos do Salgueiro (9)
- 2010 - Unidos da Tijuca (2)
- 2011 - Beija-Flor (12)
- 2012 - Unidos da Tijuca (3)
- 2013 - Unidos de Vila Isabel (3)
- 2014 - Unidos da Tijuca (4)
- 2015 - Beija-Flor (13)
- 2016 - Estação Primeira de Mangueira (19)
- 2017 - Portela (22)
- 2017 - Mocidade Independente de Padre Miguel (6)
- 2018 - Beija-Flor (14)
- 2019 - Estação Primeira de Mangueira (20)
- 2020 - Unidos do Viradouro (2)
- 2022 - Acadêmicos do Grande Rio (1)
- 2023 - Imperatriz Leopoldinense (9)
- 2024 - Unidos do Viradouro (3)
- 2025 - Beija-Flor (15)
