= Arlindo Rodrigues =

Brazilian carnavalesco

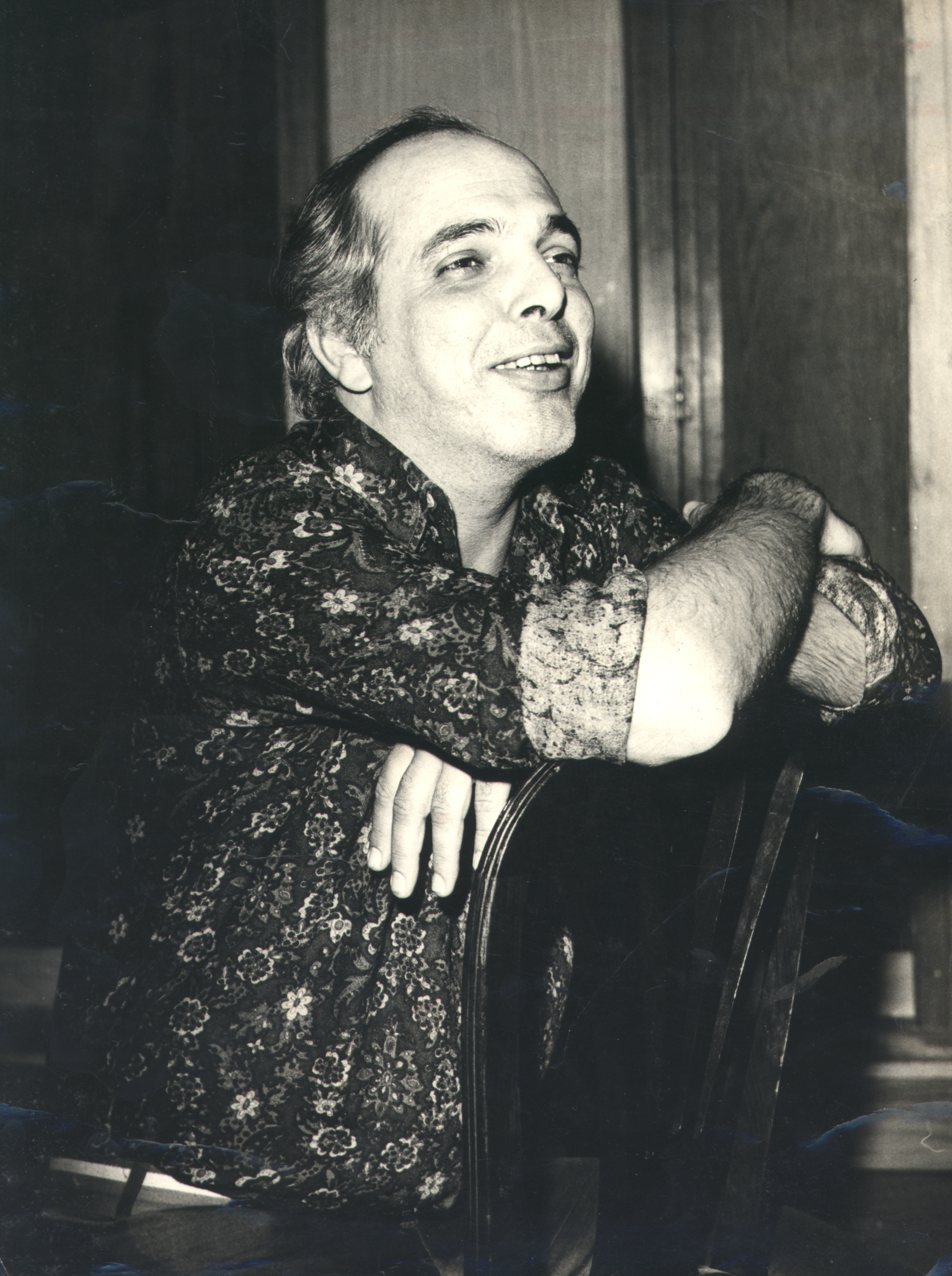
- Arlindo Rodrigues
- Born: 1931
- Died: 1987 (aged 55–56); Rio de Janeiro, Brazil
- Occupation: Carnavalesco

Arlindo Rodrigues (1931 - Rio de Janeiro, 1987) was a celebrated Brazilian carnavalesco, or carnival director. For GRES Mocidade Independente de Padre Miguel in 1974, he presented the plot "A Festa do Divino" ( "The Party of the Divine").
