= Rio Carnival =

Carnival in Rio de Janeiro, Brazil

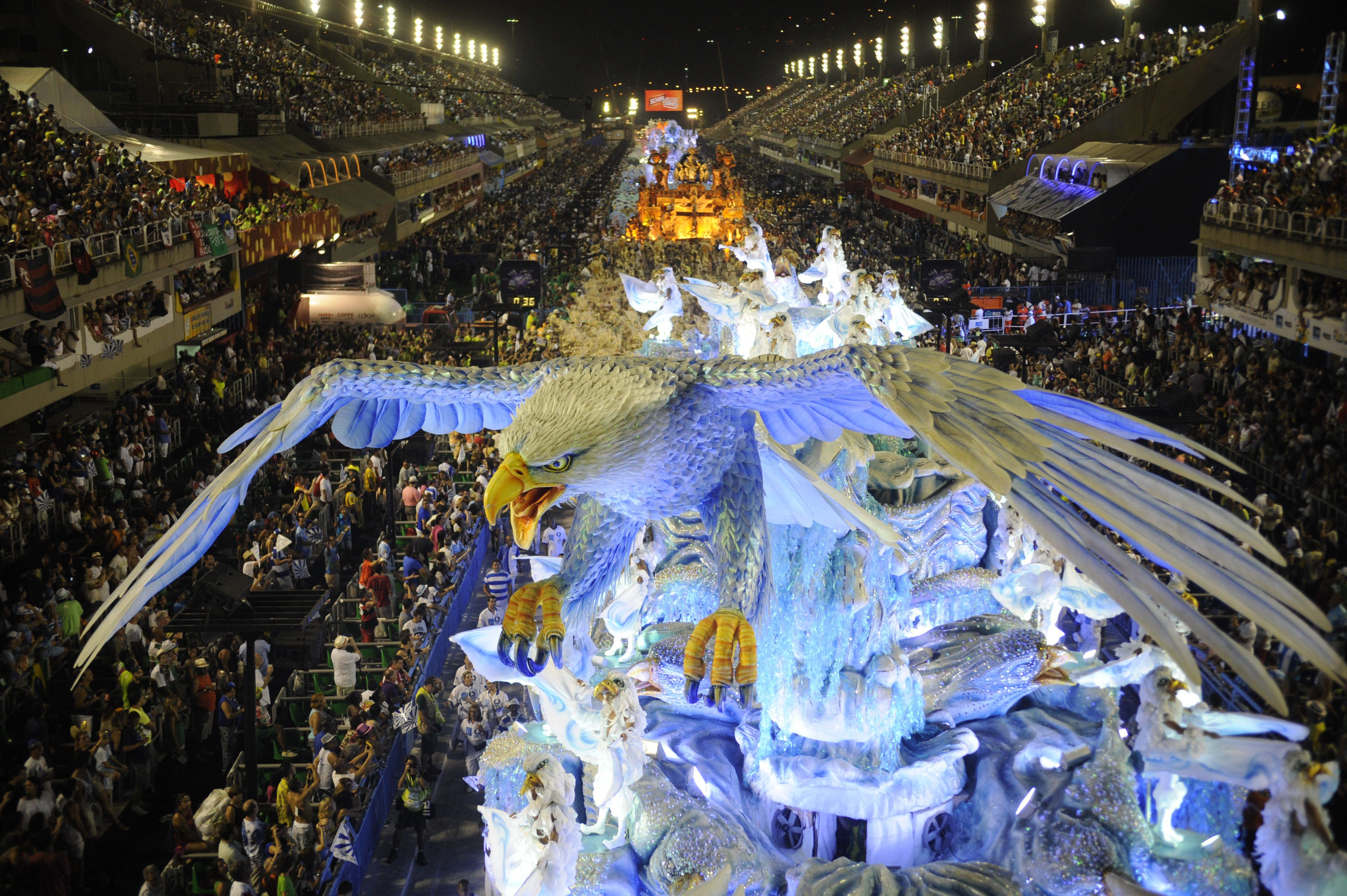
- A float at Rio Carnival, 2014
- Type: cultural, religious
- Significance: Celebration prior to fasting season of Lent.
- Celebrations: Parades, parties, open-air performances
- Begins: Friday before Ash Wednesday (51 days to Easter)
- Ends: Ash Wednesday noon (46 days before Easter)
- 2025 date: Afternoon, February 28 – midday, March 5
- 2026 date: Afternoon, February 13 – midday, February 18
- 2027 date: Afternoon, February 5 – midday, February 10
- 2028 date: Afternoon, February 25 – midday, March 1
- Duration: 5 days
- Frequency: annual
- Related to: Carnival, Brazilian Carnival, Ash Wednesday, Lent

The Carnival in Rio de Janeiro (Portuguese: Carnaval do Rio de Janeiro) is a festival held every year before Lent; it is considered the biggest celebration of Carnival in the world, with two million people per day on the streets. The first Carnival festival in Rio occurred in 1723.

The typical Rio Carnival parade is filled with revelers, floats, and adornments from numerous samba schools which are located in Rio (more than 200 approximately, divided into five leagues/divisions). A samba school is composed of a collaboration of local neighbours that want to attend the carnival together, with some kind of regional, geographical and common background.

There is a special order that every school has to follow with their parade entries. Each school begins with the "comissão de frente" (meaning "Front Commission"), that is the group of people from the school that appear first. Made of ten to fifteen people, the comissão de frente introduces the school and sets the mood and style of their presentation. These people have choreographed dances in elaborate costumes that usually tell a short story. Following the "comissão de frente" is the first float of the samba school, called "abre-alas" ("Opening Wing"). These are followed by the Mestre-sala and Porta-Bandeira ("Master of Ceremonies and Flag Bearer"), with one to four pairs, one active and three reserve, to lead the dancers, which include the old guard veterans and the "ala das baianas", with the drum line battery at the rear and sometimes a brass section and guitars. This brass section was included in the early 20th century as part of a more diverse musical ensemble which began to be offered at this time.

== History ==
The origins of the Rio Carnival celebration dates back to the 16th and 17th centuries. Carnival was brought to Brazil by Portuguese colonizers between the 16th and 17th centuries, manifesting itself initially through the 'Entrudo', a popular festival where public games and lighthearted mockery would run wild in the streets. Over time, the festival acquired other ways of manifesting itself, such as in the use of masks and costumes. O Moleque by Lima Barreto, depicts an emergence of costume which was originally used in Carnival, tracing back to the European cultural roots. The costumes are symbolic of political and cultural themes of the time, which are then integrated into Carnival. The emergence of carnival societies created by the monarch elite also contributed to the popularization of the party among the poor.

In 1840, the very first Rio masquerade took place, and polka and waltz took center stage. Later in the beginning of the 20th century the Samba and Batucada rhythms classically associated with Rio Carnival were introduced by Afro-Brazilians and Pardos, by adapting different cultural inputs to produce a new musical genre. During this period, Carnival assumed its position as the biggest popular festival in Brazil.

In the 1920s and 1930s in Rio, Samba schools were beginning to become popular as a way for blocos to increase their legitimacy and avert police oppression. Black people at the time were often oppressed by the police for any street Carnival activities due to the city's attempt to become a European-style capital at this time.

There was no carnival in 1915–18 (due to World War I) or 1940–45 (due to World War II). Once more it was canceled with strict warnings against clandestine celebrations in 2021 due to the COVID-19 pandemic in Brazil and was postponed in 2022 for similar reasons. It returned in 2023.

== Samba school parade ==
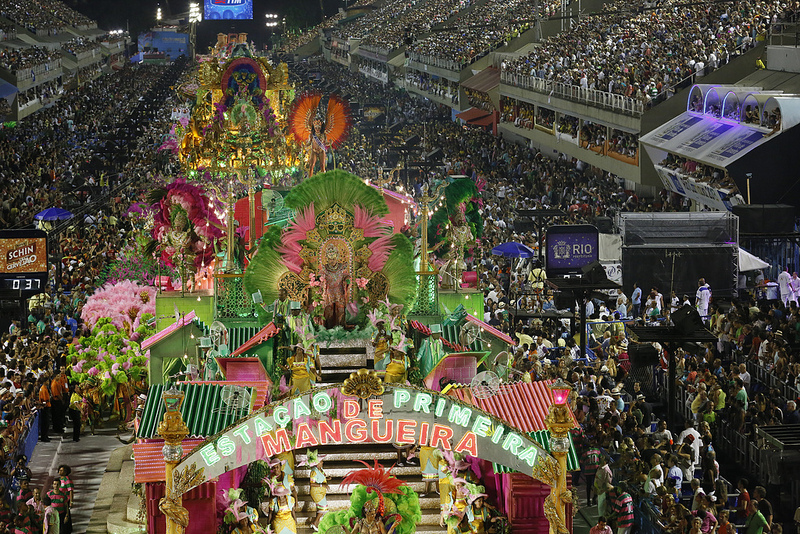
Parade of Mangueira, one of the most traditional samba schools in the Rio Carnival

The pre-existing traditions of the 'Entrudos' and other popular festivities such as the 'ranches' and 'Cordão carnavalesco' that dated from the Empire would eventually be combined into carnival blocks by the 1920s, and evolve into their ultimate form - the Rio samba schools.

Estácio de Sá, together with Portela and Estação Primeira de Mangueira paraded for the first time in the city in 1929. All three were former carnival blocks which transformed into schools with professional staffing and city support. In 1930, seven schools were already active in the city. With the works of in Avenida Presidente Vargas, the parade moved there, and from 1942 to 1945 the parade was held in São Januário. From 1952 temporary stands for the public were annually assembled, and in 1961 paid tickets made their debut to take advantage of the rising international and national interest and the increasing tourist arrivals. In 1974, due to the works of the subway, the parade was held on Avenida Presidente Antônio Carlos, from where it was also broadcast for the first time in color television. In 1978, the parade was transferred to the Marquês de Sapucaí Avenue, where it remains up to this day. In 1983, the then governor Leonel Brizola commissioned the architect Oscar Niemeyer the project of a permanent local stadium for the parades in that same area, because until then the bleachers had continued to be temporary, and only assembled and disassembled for the event.

With the increase in the number of schools taking part, which made the parade longer and tiring for the public, in 1984 the parade was separated into two dates and categories: Friday evening into Saturday morning for the lower-level schools; and Sunday evening into Monday morning for the major schools, including the more recognizable ones. That year, a "super-champion" school was also announced following the parade of the champions that took place the following Saturday, which by that time were awarded for the best performances of the past nights of competition. Since this practice was never again repeated, Mangueira remains the only samba school to ever be awarded with the title and dignity of "super-champion" of the annual event. Portela is the samba school that has the largest number of championships with 22.

The schools of the Special Group under LIESA parade over two days (Sunday and Monday), while the A Series schools parade on Friday and Saturday under LIERJ, which also has the B Series, which parades on Fat Tuesday. Both organizations were under the AESCRJ banner before it lost organizing rights, thus also providing for the establishment of new organizations like LIESB and Samba é Nosso for the lower level divisions. The Gold Division (A Series) champion school which advances directly as a participant in the Special Group for the next year's Carnival parades last on Carnival Monday while the Special Group champion parades once more on the Saturday after Ash Wednesday.

As of 2018, LIESB handed over the management of the E series and its schools to ACAS, which now operates it as a rookie level organization for samba schools, in 2020 the C Series (Silver Division) fell under a new organization, LIVRES, with LIESB handling the divisions above and below it.

=== Music ===
Many songs and musicians play during the carnival in Rio to celebrate the roots of Rios culture. Music is a big part of the celebration and multiple artists and musicians come together to celebrate. The music played ranges from Orchestra throughout pop songs with Brazilian beats. The Orchestra Voadora has played multiple times at carnival, and they continue to do so with many musicians like Voadoras trumpet player Daniel Paiva. Pre-samba rhythms like maxixe, polka, and lundu were important to the development of samba. Carnival music in Rio has evolved as Samba became the main thing gaining popularity with both the elite and the working class by the 1910s

There has been a revival of street carnival traditions through brass bands, also known as Blocos De Rua, playing alternative and international music styles in the 21st century. Commercialization of samba school is often challenged by bands reviving more grassroots, participatory music forms. Dozens of new street bands sprang up in the early 2000s. Many centered-on street bands instead of the traditional samba-school bateria. Band groups with trombones, trumpets, sousaphones and remodeled band horns. These groups reclaimed public spaces having whole neighborhoods into open air dance floors. Revivalists openly took in styles like Jazz, Funk, soul, Afrobeat, and even electronic dance music. This global mix both honors samba's synthetic roots and pushes carnival music toward new things.

The Rio Carnaval has had a lot of cultural importances and global appeal. Each samba school parade revolves around a specially made samba enredo. This is music that can celebrate Afro-Brazilian heritage or to recall historical events. Through the lyrics, dancing, and floats, the carnival music becomes something for collective memory and political commentary changing each parade into a special drama of Brazilian heritage. The Rio Carnival by it being only a year-round community anchor. Beyond the four day event, samba schools work as social and cultural places in their neighborhoods. This is shown by weekly rehearsals and youth music workshops keeping the rhythm alive all year round, adopting intergenerational bonds.

The Rio de Janeiro's city hall had a community project to boost the cities culture. This project has helped attract tourists to come and celebrate its history and as well as Rios carnival. They have actively organized international exhibitions to promote the music and culture. The exhibitions are designed to show the diversity and culture of Rios carnival and uses the music as central element to attract global attention and more tourists. The music is also promoted through magazines and education allowing for younger people to understand the cultural and historical significance and can help connect to the rest of the world.

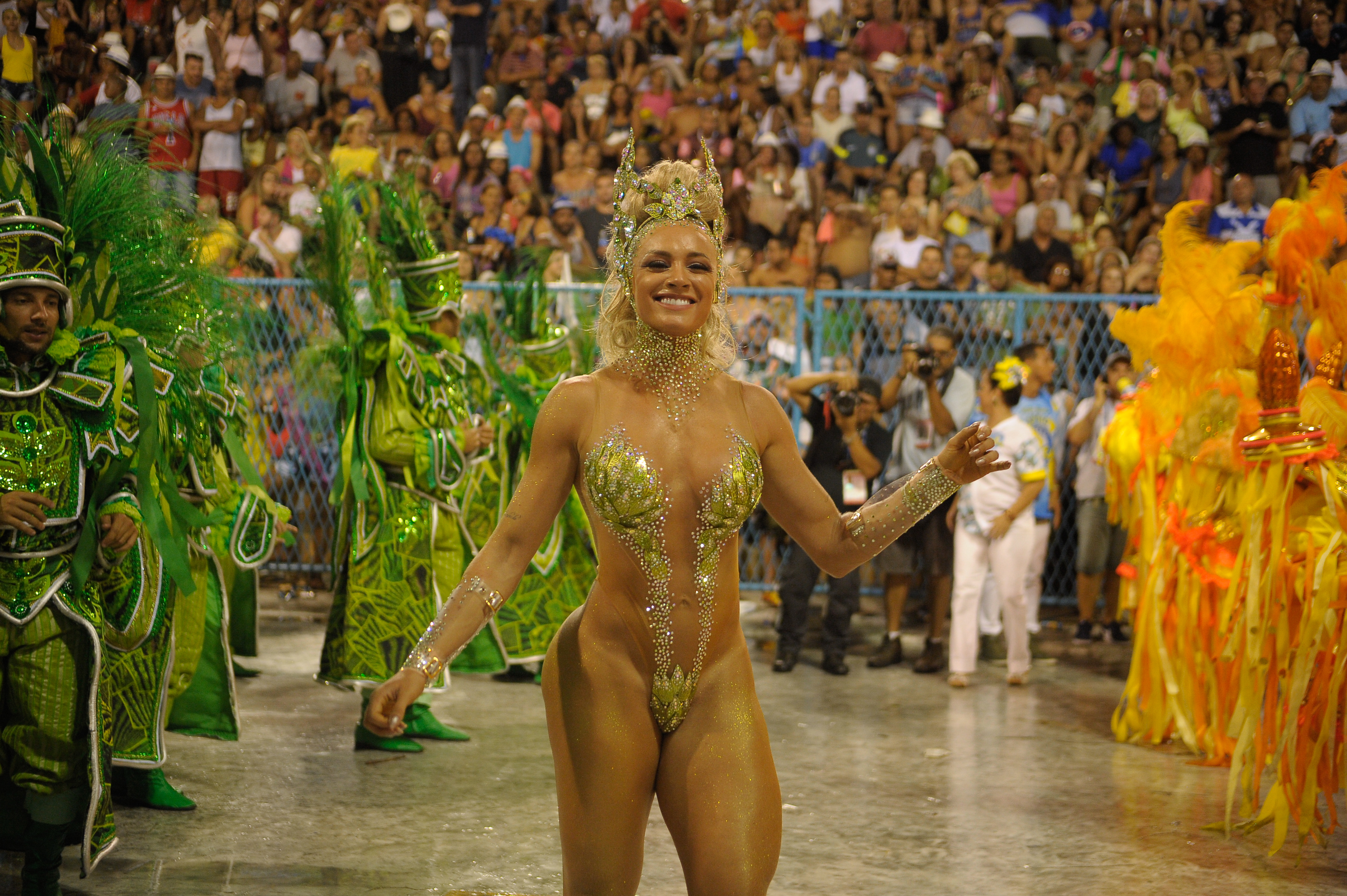
A typical performer of Samba dance

=== Dates ===
Rio's Carnival begins on the Friday preceding Lent and ends on Ash Wednesday, but the Winners' Parade happens on the Saturday after the carnival ends. The winning school and runners' up of the Special Group, as well as the A Series champion school, all march past one final time in front of their supporters on this night. “Held the week before Ash Wednesday, the samba school parades thrive as both a cultural performance tradition and an urban entertainment business. The parades are an amalgamation of dance, fashion, music, narrative, spectacle, and competition in which thousands of performers process in the early morning hours through the Sambadrome (Sambódromo), a linear structure consisting of a runway for the parades and bleacher seating for 72,500 spectators.”

- February 21 to 26, 2020
- February 12 to 17, 2021 (cancelled due to COVID-19 pandemic)
- April 20 to April 30, 2022 (moved up due to COVID-19 and coincide with Tiradentes' Day)
- February 17 to 22, 2029

=== Tickets ===
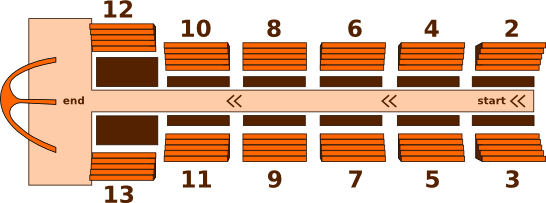
Sambadrome sectors diagram

In 1984, the government decided to give Rio Carnival its new home in the Sambadrome. Today, some of the most famous events of Rio Carnival are ticketed events. There are different types of Sambadrome tickets that are available for purchase. Grandstand tickets are general admissions tickets that are available on a first-come, first-served basis and are not allocated ahead of time. Frisas are open air box seats located along the samba runway. Camarotes are luxury boxes situated between the frisas and the grandstands. Sector 9 is the tourist sector which are the same as grandstand tickets, with the difference being that they are allocated so people have assigned seats.

Carnival ticket prices can vary depending on the ticket type, sector and season. The cheapest sectors are 12 and 13. Tickets can be bought in advance through international brokers, or through local travel agents in Rio de Janeiro. 'Purchase of a ticket' normally means purchase of a voucher which is then exchangeable for the ticket close to the date. Ticket sales are organised by LIESA, who will often also make tickets available at late notice via a venue (often a bank) announced the day before. LIESA prices for grandstand tickets vary from Rs5 to Rs500 for the Tourist Sector (2014 prices) (Rs500 = approx. US$250). LIESA publish the base price of the tickets, and agents and brokers charge more (sometimes significantly more) but offer considerable convenience and other benefits.

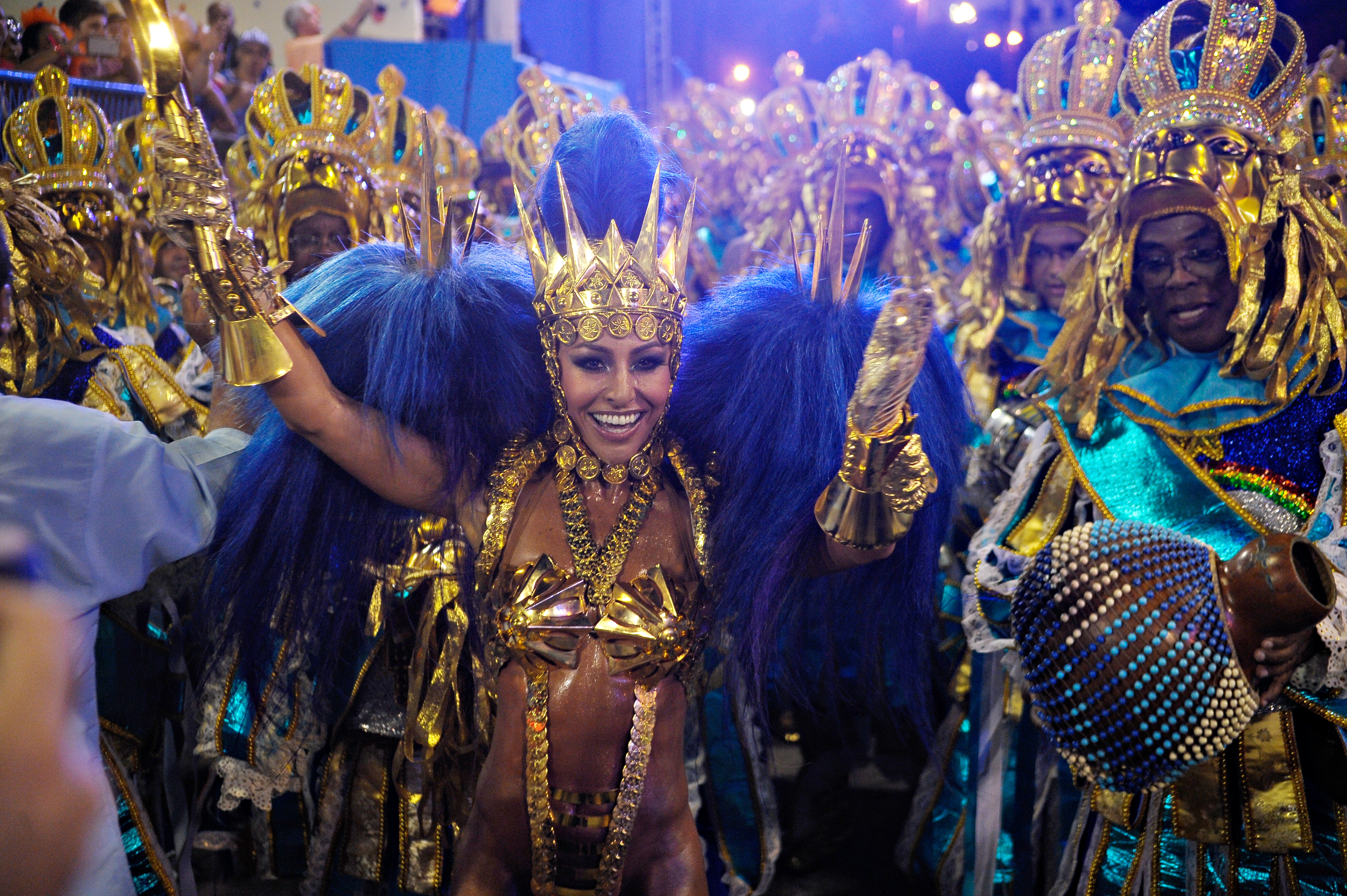
Drum Queen

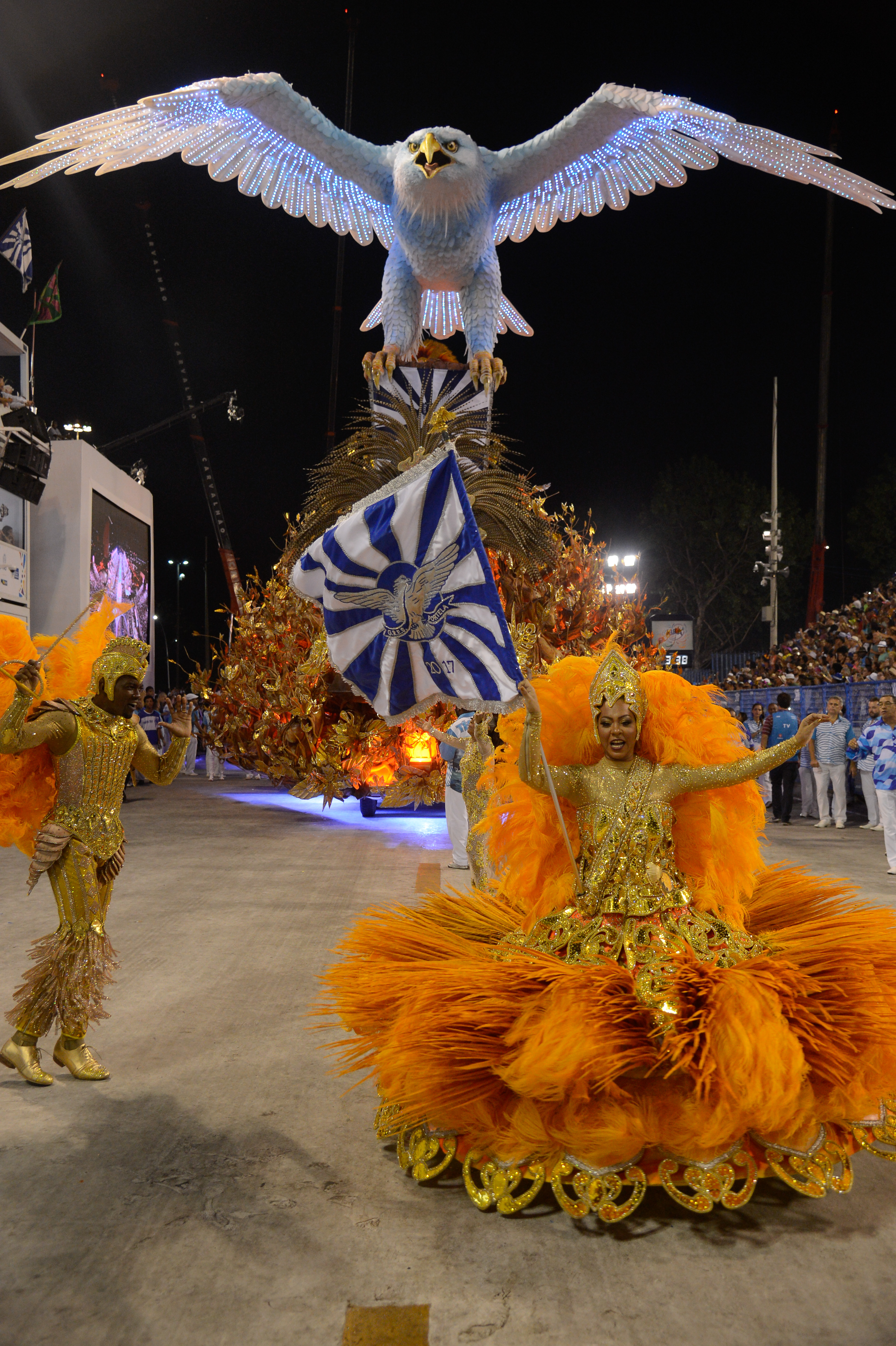
Flag bearer and master of ceremony

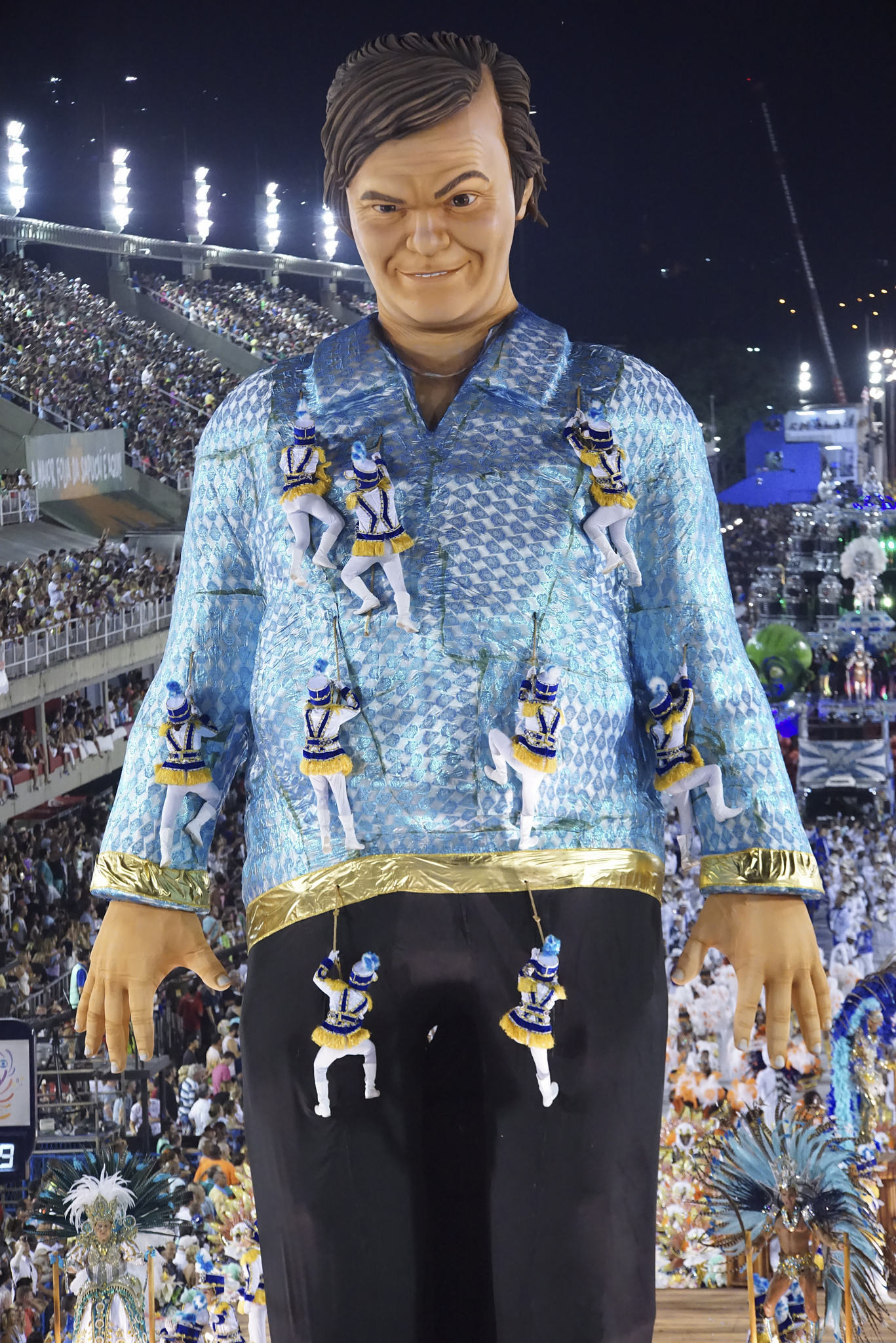
Float with a giant Lemuel Gulliver

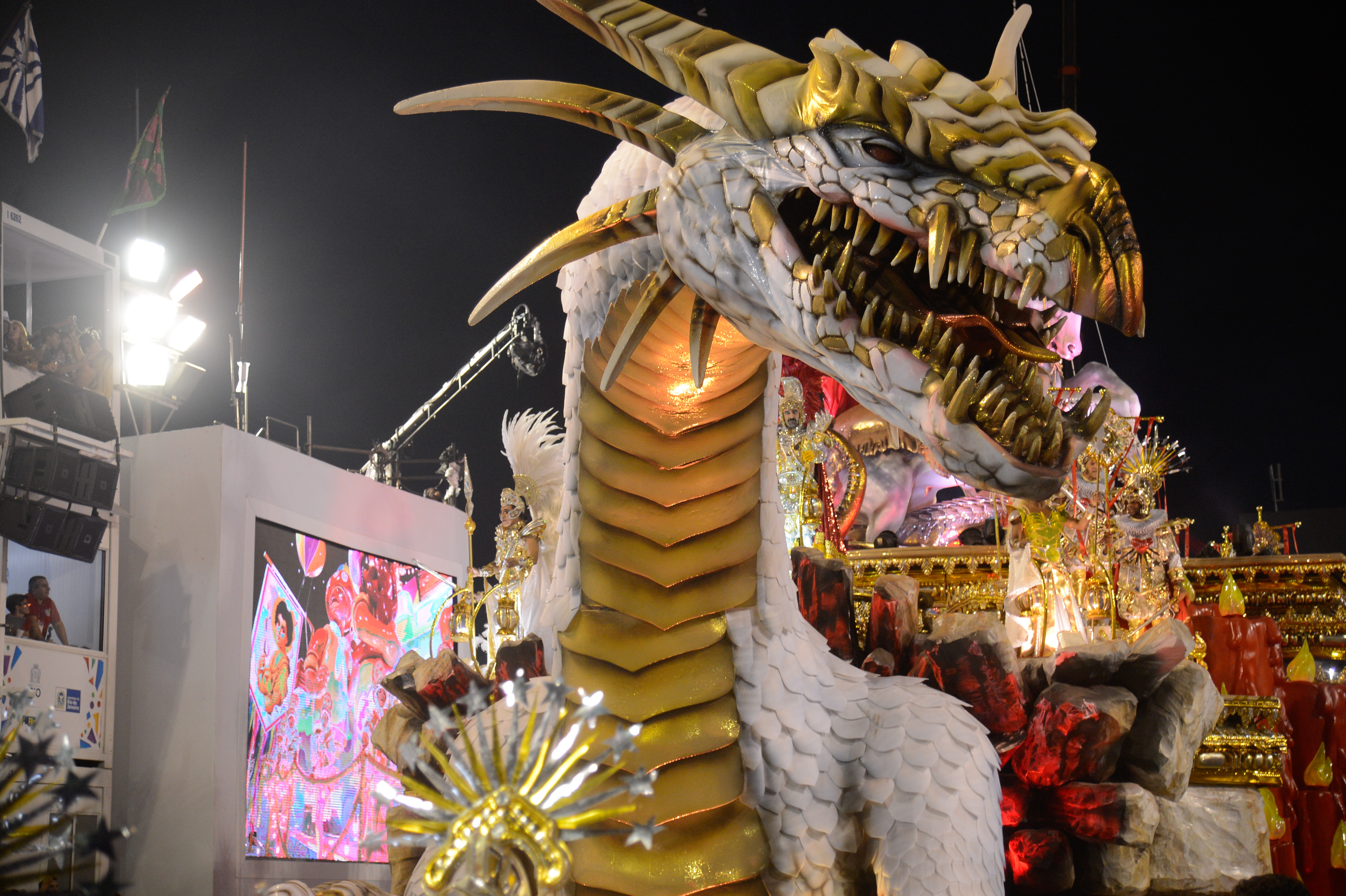
A float with the Dragon of Saint George

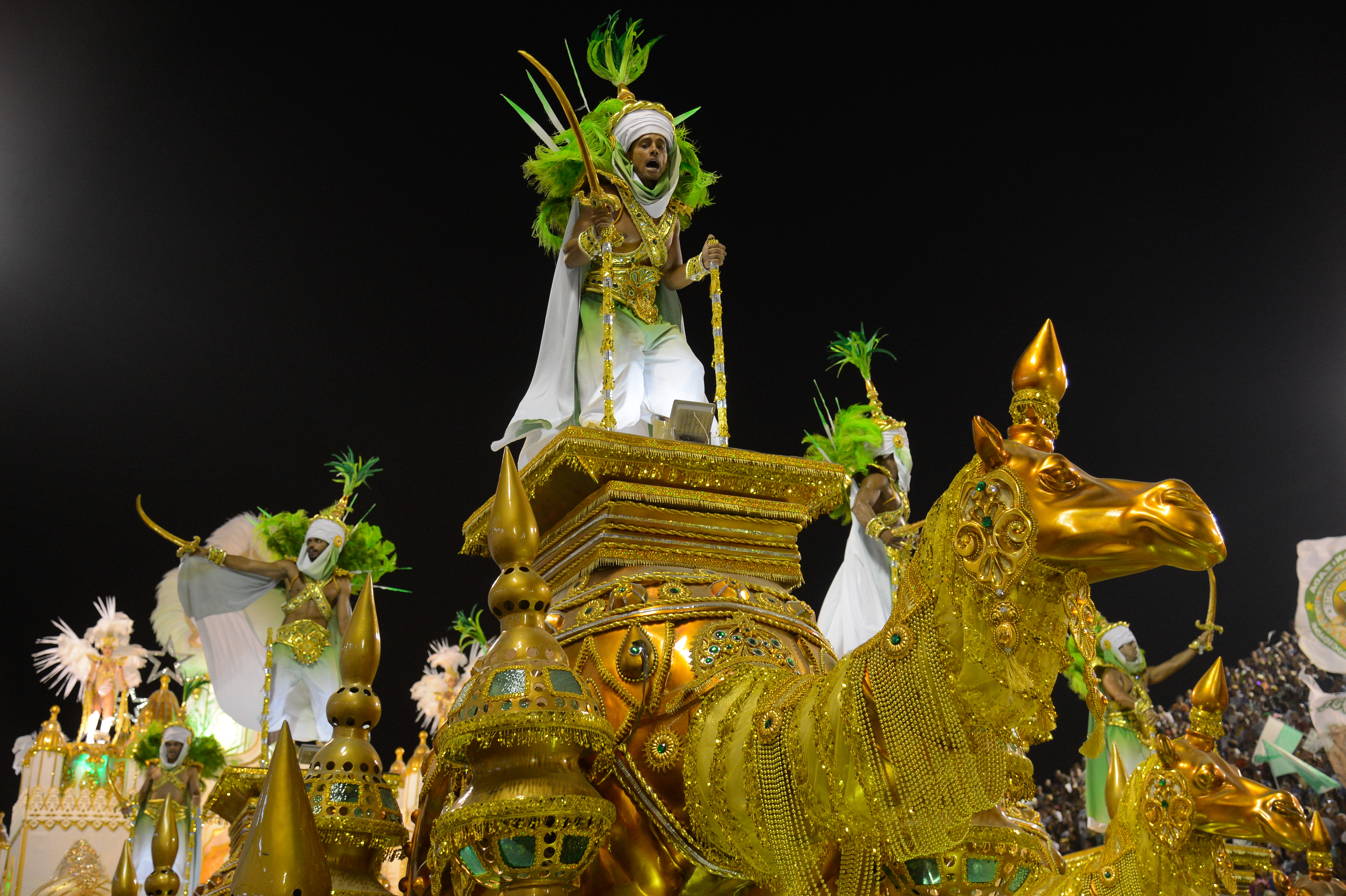
A float with a camel caravan

== Street carnival ==
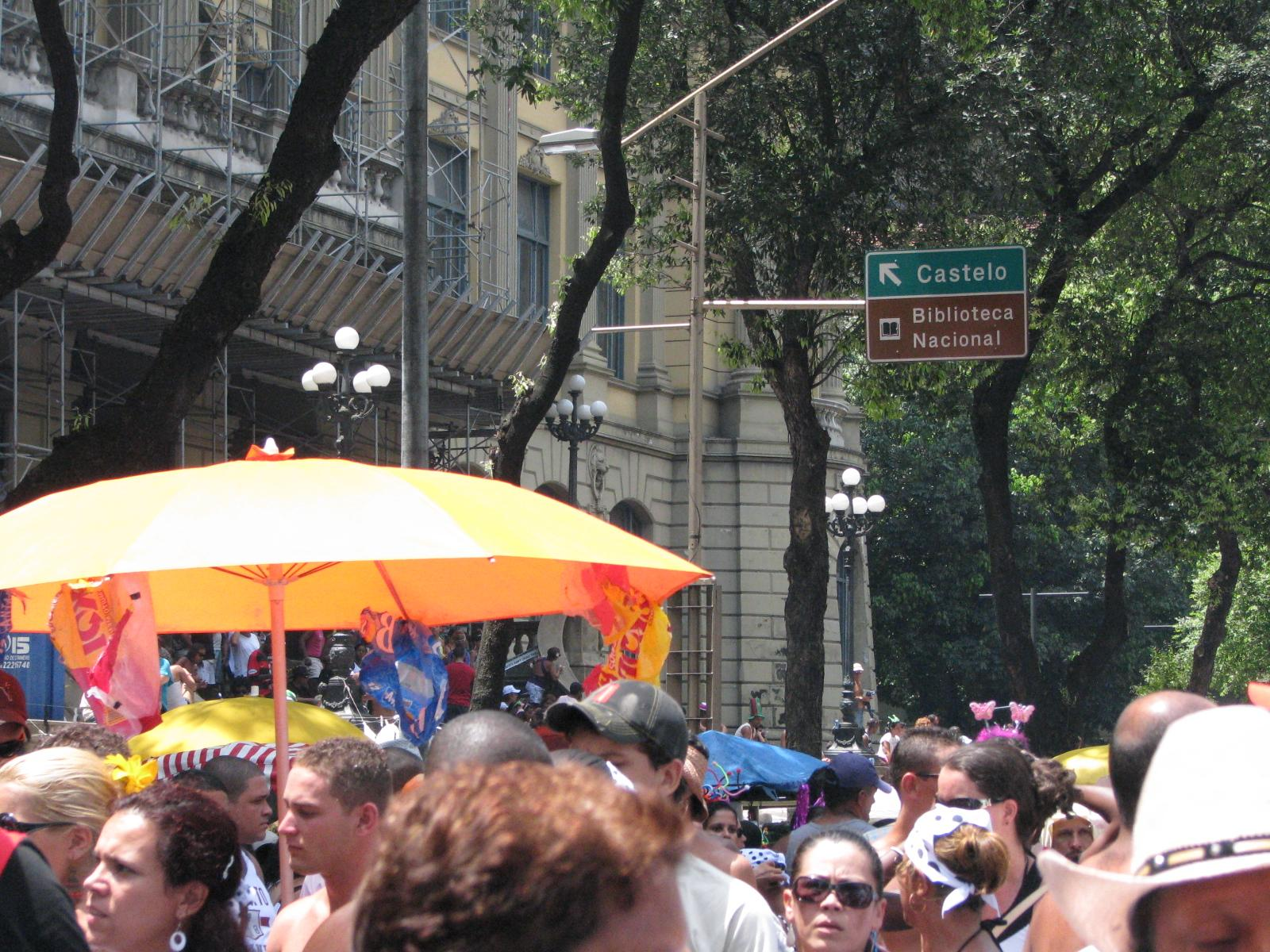
Cordão da Bola Preta, the oldest street block of Rio de Janeiro's Carnival

As the parade is taking place in the Sambadrome Marquês de Sapucaí and the balls are being held in the Copacabana Palace and beach, many carnival participants are at other locations. Street festivals are very common during carnival and are highly populated by the locals. Elegance and extravagance are usually left behind, but music and dancing are still extremely common. Anyone is allowed to participate in the street festivals. Bandas are very familiar with the street carnival especially because it takes nothing to join in on the fun except to jump in. One of the most well known bandas of Rio is Banda de Ipanema. Banda de Ipanema was first created in 1965 and is known as Rio's most irreverent street band.

Rio de Janeiro is "submerged", almost "invisible" and that emerges with full intensity during Carnival. Even though this is only clearly perceived during Carnival, this city is occupied (especially in the central area) extensively by actors who, in different locations, play, sing and dance, giving new meaning to their daily lives and their relationship with the city's public spaces. Incorporated into every aspect of the Rio Carnival are dancing and music. The most famous dance in Brazilian carnival is samba. The samba remains a popular dance not only in carnival but in the ghettos outside of the main cities. These villages keep alive the historical aspect of the dance without the influence of the western cultures.

Music is another major part of all aspects of the carnival. As stated by Samba City, "Samba Carnival Instruments are an important part of Brazil and the Rio de Janeiro carnival, sending out the irresistible beats and rhythms making the crowd explode in a colourful dance revolution fantasy fest!".

Street parades, blocos, and bandas take place throughout the city of Rio during Carnival, the most famous and largest carnival celebration of the world. There can be more than 300 bandas taking place at any given point in time. While the biggest street party takes place right outside the Sambadrome, the largest organized street dance is typically found on Cinelândia Square in Rio's Centro. In 2012, more than 2 million revelers took to the streets of Rio de Janeiro to participate in the Cordão da Bola Preta bloco. According to police estimates, more than 5 million people attended a bloco during Rio Carnival 2012 and there was not one reported incident of crime.

When the Sambadrome was built in 1984, it had the side-effect of taking street parades from the downtown area to a specific, ticketed performance area. Some samba schools have since been motivated by an agenda that focuses on regaining public space, and using the carnival tradition to occupy the streets with parades or blocos. Many of these represent a local community of the area but are open to all.

Several of the Rio street carnival blocks that hold the parties are affiliated to the Rio de Janeiro State Street Carnival Blocks Federation (FBCERJ), established in 1965.

== Corte real ==
=== Queens of Carnival ===
The Queen of the Carnival in Rio de Janeiro and up to two princesses having the duty to woo the revelry, along with the King Momo. Unlike some cities, in the city of Rio de Janeiro, Queens of Carnival do not see a certain school of samba. In competitions, princesses are usually placed as second and third, and are correspondingly 1st and 2nd Princess. Some of them after the reign become queens or battery bridesmaids.

Years	Queens of Carnival	1st Princess	2nd Princess	Ref.
2004	Priscila Mendes			
2005	Ana Paula Evangelista	Elaine Babo		
2006	Ana Paula Evangelista	Cristiane Hani		
2007	Jaqueline Faria	Jacqueline Nascimento	Mônika Nascimento	
2008	Kétula Mello	Charlene Costa	Jaqueline Faria	
2009	Jéssica Maia	Charlene Costa	Shayene Cesário	
2010	Shayene Cesário	Talita Castilhos	Suellen Pinto	
2011	Bianca Salgueiro	Talita Castilhos	Suzan Gonçalves	
2012	Cris Alves	Letícia Guimarães	Suzan Gonçalves	
2013	Evelyn Bastos	Letícia Guimarães	Clara Paixão	
2014	Letícia Guimarães	Clara Paixão	Graciele Chaveirinho	
2015	Clara Paixão	Bianca Monteiro	Uillana Adães	
2016	Clara Paixão	Uillana Adães	Bianca Monteiro	
2017	Uillana Adães	Joice Rocha	Deisiane Conceição	
2018	Jéssica Maia	Deisiane Conceição	Cintia de Oliveira	
2019	Clara Paixão	Deisiane Conceição	Viviane Silveira	
2020	Camila Silva	Deisiane Conceição	Cinthia de Oliveira	
2023	Mari Mola	Monalisa Carvalho	Rhuanda Monteiro	
2024	Gabriela Medeiros	Bruna dos Santos	Ana Carolina de Souza	

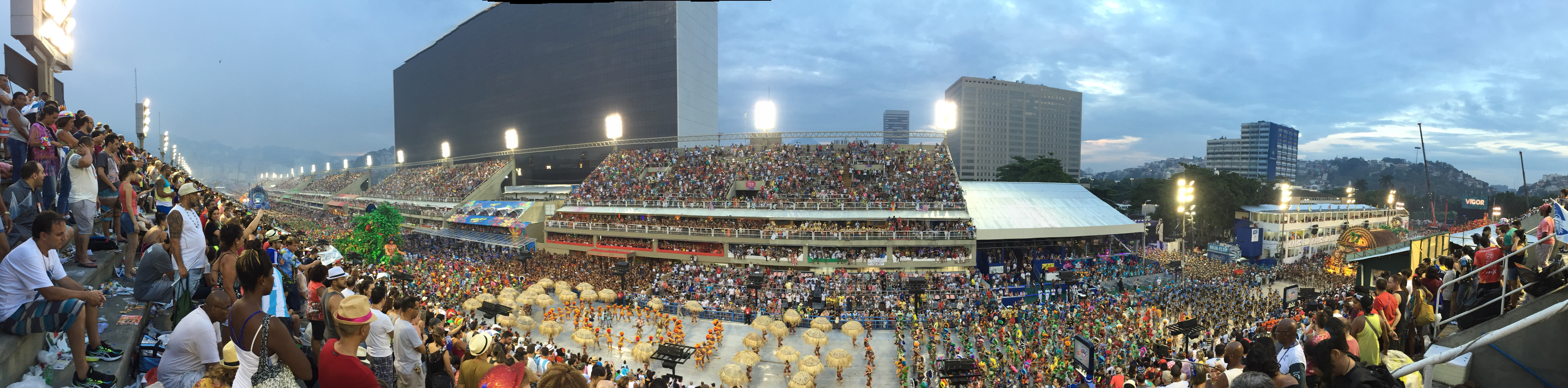
Samba Parade at the Sambódromo (Sambadrome) during the Rio Carnival

== In popular culture ==
=== Cinema ===
- The French film Orfeu Negro (1958), by Marcel Camus, makes a transposition of the Greek myth of Orpheus and Eurydice in Rio Carnival.
- The Brazilian film Apaixonados (2016), by Paulo Fontenelle, tells the story of three couples who meet during the carnival
- The Brazilian film Orfeu (1999), by Cacá Diegues, is another transposition of the myth of Orpheus and Eurydice in Rio Carnival.
- The movie Rio about Blu the blue macaw takes place during carnival season in Rio de Janeiro.

=== Literature ===
- The novel A Moreninha (1844), by Joaquim Manuel de Macedo, tells a love story in the middle of Rio Carnival, on Paquetá Island.
- The novel O cortiço (1890), by Aluísio Azevedo, depicts Rio Carnival in the 19th century.
- The novel A Grande Arte (1983), by Rubem Fonseca, is about the investigation of an ex private eye during Rio Carnival.
- The two novellas of Os Prisoneiros (1963), by Rubem Fonseca, take place during Rio Carnival.
- The plot of the novel O Grande Dia (2024), by the Swiss writer Pierre Cormon, revolves around a parade by the imaginary samba school Unidos de Madureira.

== Twinning ==
- Santa Cruz de Tenerife, Spain; Since 1984, Rio de Janeiro is twinned with the city of Santa Cruz de Tenerife for the special link between the Carnival of Rio and the Carnival of Santa Cruz de Tenerife.

== See also ==
- Brazilian Carnival
- Tourism in Brazil
- Culture of Brazil
