= 2016 Rio Carnival Leagues =

Are the alloys of carnival that organize the parades conducted outside the Marquês de Sapucaí. The LIESB took over the organization of the lower level divisions'. In 2015, disagreements on the board of AESCRJ led the organization to suffer intervention by RioTur on the eve of the carnival. because of this, after the carnival that year came the LIESB and Samba é Nosso. where twelve of fourteen guilds of the Série B decide founded the LIESB and part of the samba schools Série B and all schools of Series C, D, E in Samba é Nosso.

However, the aim of LIESB aim has not been officially disclosed, and they have already set up their first parade order, which was held in May 2015 and the elected the then vice-president of the Portela, Marcos Falcon its new representative. However, with schools migrating from alloys, caused a commotion where who took command of the Intendente Magalhães.

Although the organization came to get authorization from Riotur to administer all groups in Intendente, The LIESB also managed to authorization, generating even more the impasse that was only defined after meeting at RioTur which determined Série B with LIESB and Samba é Nosso with the other groups. but with the death of Marcos Falcon, who was also president of the Portela, shot dead, the Samba é Nosso decided the lower level leagues be organized by a singular organization thus the LIESB besides Series B is responsible for the Series C, D, and E schools.

While the losing schools of the E Series are stripped of parading status for Carnival and the lower placing schools in each of the other series is placed one level below in the next year, the winner of the lowel level divisions advances to higher levels, the Series B winner advances to the A Series, joins as a full member of LIERJ and therefore granted its Sambodrome privilege with the non-subsidy. In time for the 2018 Carnival season LIESB jointly decided to transfer the control of the E Series to ACAS, which reorganized it to suit not just veteran schools but also some new schools being formed within the Greater Rio area and at carnival 2020, LIVRES appears, formed by directors of samba schools unhappy with the direction of LIESB.

LIESB/SUPERLIGA Presidents
Heitor Fernandes
Gustavo Barros
Clayton Ferreira
ACAS Presidents
Gilberto Leão
LIVRES Presidents
Raphaela Nascimento

== Third Division Champions ==
- 1960 - Unidos de Vila Isabel (1)
- 1961 - Imperatriz Leopoldinense (1)
- 1962 - Independente de Cordovil (1)
- 1963 - Acadêmicos de Santa Cruz (1)
- 1964 - São Clemente (1)
- 1965 - Estácio de Sá (1)
- 1966 - Em Cima da Hora (1)
- 1967 - Unidos do Jacarezinho (1)
- 1968 - Paraíso do Tuiuti (1)
- 1969 - Unidos do Cabuçu (1)
- 1970 - Cartolinhas de Caxias (1)
- 1971 - Caprichosos de Pilares (1)
- 1972 - Império de Campo Grande (1)
- 1973 - Acadêmicos de Santa Cruz (2)
- 1974 - Unidos de Padre Miguel (1)
- 1975 - Arranco (1)
- 1976 - Arrastão de Cascadura (1)
- 1977 - Acadêmicos do Engenho da Rainha (1)
- 1978 - Em Cima da Hora (2)
- 1979 - Império da Tijuca (1)
- 1980 - Acadêmicos de Santa Cruz (3)
- 1981 - Unidos da Ponte (1)
- 1982 - Unidos do Jacarezinho (2)
- 1983 - Acadêmicos do Engenho da Rainha (2)
- 1984 - Arranco (2)
- 1985 - Independente de Cordovil (2)
- 1986 - Tradição (1)
- 1987 - Paraíso do Tuiuti (1)
- 1988 - Arrastão de Cascadura (2)
- 1989 - Unidos do Viradouro (1)
- 1990 - Leão de Nova Iguaçu (1)
- 1991 - Acadêmicos da Rocinha (1)
- 1992 - Arrastão de Cascadura (3)
- 1993 - Unidos da Villa Rica (1)
- 1994 - Difícil é o Nome (1)
- 1994 - Acadêmicos do Dendê (1)
- 1996 - Arranco (3)
- 1997 - Lins Imperial (1)
- 1998 - Unidos do Jacarezinho (3)
- 1999 - Acadêmicos da Rocinha (2)
- 2000 - Leão de Nova Iguaçu (2)
- 2001 - Acadêmicos da Rocinha (3)
- 2002 - Acadêmicos do Cubango (1)
- 2003 - Lins Imperial (2)
- 2004 - Vizinha Faladeira (1)
- 2005 - Estácio de Sá (2)
- 2006 - Império da Tijuca (2)
- 2007 - Lins Imperial (3)
- 2008 - Inocentes de Belford Roxo (1)
- 2009 - Unidos de Padre Miguel (2)
- 2009 - Acadêmicos do Cubango (2)
- 2010 - Alegria da Zona Sul (1)
- 2011 - Paraíso do Tuiuti (2)
- 2012 - Caprichosos de Pilares (2)
- 2013 - Em Cima da Hora (2)
- 2014 - Unidos de Bangu (1)
- 2015 - Acadêmicos da Rocinha (4)
- 2016 - Acadêmicos do Sossego (1)
- 2017 - Unidos de Bangu (2)
- 2018 - Unidos da Ponte (2)
- 2019 - Acadêmicos de Vigário Geral (1)
- 2020 - LIESB: Lins Imperial (4) / LIVRES: Tradição (2)
- 2022 - SUPERLIGA: União de Jacarepaguá (1) / LIVRES: Acadêmicos do Engenho da Rainha (3)
- 2023 - SUPERLIGA: Sereno de Campo Grande (1) / LIVRES: Vizinha Faladeira (2)
- 2024 - Tradição (3)

== Fourth Division Champions ==
- 1979 - Foliões de Botafogo (1)
- 1980 - Paraíso do Tuiuti (1)
- 1980 - Mocidade Unida da Cidade de Deus (1)
- 1981 - Unidos de Nilópolis (1)
- 1982 - Unidos da Vila Santa Tereza (1)
- 1983 - Mocidade Unida da Cidade de Deus (2)
- 1984 - União de Vaz Lobo (1)
- 1985 - Tradição (1)
- 1986 - Império do Marangá (1)
- 1987 - Mocidade Unida da Cidade de Deus (3)
- 1988 - Leão de Nova Iguaçu (1)
- 1989 - União de Rocha Miranda (1)
- 1990 - Acadêmicos da Rocinha (1)
- 1991 - Canários das Laranjeiras (1)
- 1992 - Vizinha Faladeira (1)
- 1993 - Boi da Ilha do Governador (1)
- 1994 - Acadêmicos do Dendê (1)
- 1995 - Flor da Mina do Andaraí (1)
- 1996 - Boi da Ilha do Governador (2)
- 1997 - Paraíso do Tuiuti (2)
- 1998 - Inocentes de Belford Roxo (1)
- 1999 - Leão de Nova Iguaçu (2)
- 2000 - Unidos da Vila Kennedy (1)
- 2001 - Alegria da Zona Sul (1)
- 2002 - Acadêmicos da Barra da Tijuca (1)
- 2003 - Unidos da Vila Kennedy (1)
- 2004 - Independente da Praça da Bandeira (1)
- 2005 - União do Parque Curicica (1)
- 2006 - Unidos de Padre Miguel (1)
- 2007 - Mocidade de Vicente de Carvalho (1)
- 2008 - Unidos do Jacarezinho (1)
- 2009 - Acadêmicos do Sossego (1)
- 2010 - Independente da Praça da Bandeira (2)
- 2011 - Unidos da Vila Santa Tereza (1)
- 2012 - Unidos do Jacarezinho (2)
- 2013 - Unidos do Cabuçu (1)
- 2014 - Mocidade Unida do Santa Marta (1)
- 2015 - Leão de Nova Iguaçu (3)
- 2016 - Vizinha Faladeira (2)
- 2017 - Unidos das Vargens (1)
- 2018 - União de Maricá (1)
- 2019 - Império da Uva (1)
- 2020 - Caprichosos de Pilares (1)
- 2022 - SUPERLIGA: Arrastão de Cascadura (1) / LIVRES: Boi da Ilha do Governador (3)
- 2023 - Flamanguaça (1)
- 2024 - Boi da Ilha do Governador (4)

== Five Division Champions ==
- 1989 - Acadêmicos da Rocinha (1)
- 1990 - Vizinha Faladeira (1)
- 1991 - Unidos da Villa Rica (1)
- 1992 - Acadêmicos de Vigário Geral (1)
- 1993 - Flor da Mina do Andaraí (1)
- 1994 - Alegria da Zona Sul (1)
- 1995 - União de Vaz Lobo (1)
- 1996 - Unidos do Campinho (1)
- 1997 - Acadêmicos do Sossego (1)
- 1998 - União de Jacarepaguá (1)
- 1999 - Renascer de Jacarepaguá (1)
- 2000 - Alegria da Zona Sul (2)
- 2001 - Acadêmicos da Barra da Tijuca (1)
- 2002 - Mocidade de Vicente de Carvalho (1)
- 2003 - Independente da Praça da Bandeira (1)
- 2004 - Flor da Mina do Andaraí (2)
- 2005 - Unidos de Padre Miguel (1)
- 2006 - Em Cima da Hora (1)
- 2007 - Corações Unidos do Amarelinho (1)
- 2008 - Acadêmicos do Sossego (1)
- 2009 - Acadêmicos do Engenho da Rainha (1)
- 2010 - Em Cima da Hora (2)
- 2011 - Império da Praça Seca (1)
- 2012 - Unidos de Lucas (1)
- 2013 - Mocidade Unida do Santa Marta (1)
- 2014 - Unidos das Vargens (1)
- 2015 - Vizinha Faladeira (2)
- 2016 - Flor da Mina do Andaraí (3)
- 2017 - Império da Uva (1)
- 2018 - Unidos da Villa Rica (2)
- 2019 - União de Jacarepaguá (1)
- 2020 - Arrastão de Cascadura (1)
- 2022 - Flamanguaça (1)
- 2023 - Alegria do Vilar (1)
- 2024 - Unidos da Vila Kennedy (1)

== Six Division Champions ==
- 1996 - Alegria da Zona Sul (1)
- 1997 - Mocidade Independente de Inhaúma (1)
- 1997 - Acadêmicos do Cachambi (1)
- 1998 - Boêmios de Inhaúma (1)
- 1999 - União do Parque Curicica (1)
- 2000 - Acadêmicos da Barra da Tijuca (1)
- 2001 - Acadêmicos do Dendê (1)
- 2002 - Sereno de Campo Grande (1)
- 2002 - Independente da Praça da Bandeira (2)
- 2003 - Flor da Mina do Andaraí (1)
- 2004 - Mocidade Unida da Cidade de Deus (1)
- 2005 - Unidos do Uraiti (1)
- 2006 - Rosa de Ouro (1)
- 2007 - Mocidade Independente de Inhaúma (2)
- 2008 - Imperial de Nova Iguaçu (1)
- 2009 - Favo de Acari (1)
- 2010 - Leão de Nova Iguaçu (1)
- 2011 - Unidos de Lucas
- 2012 - Siri de Ramos (1)
- 2015 - Império da Uva (1)
- 2016 - Nação Insulana (1)
- 2017 - Império Ricardense (1)
- 2018 - Independentes de Olaria (1)
- 2019 - Acadêmicos da Diversidade (1)
