= Results of the 2016 Rio Carnival =

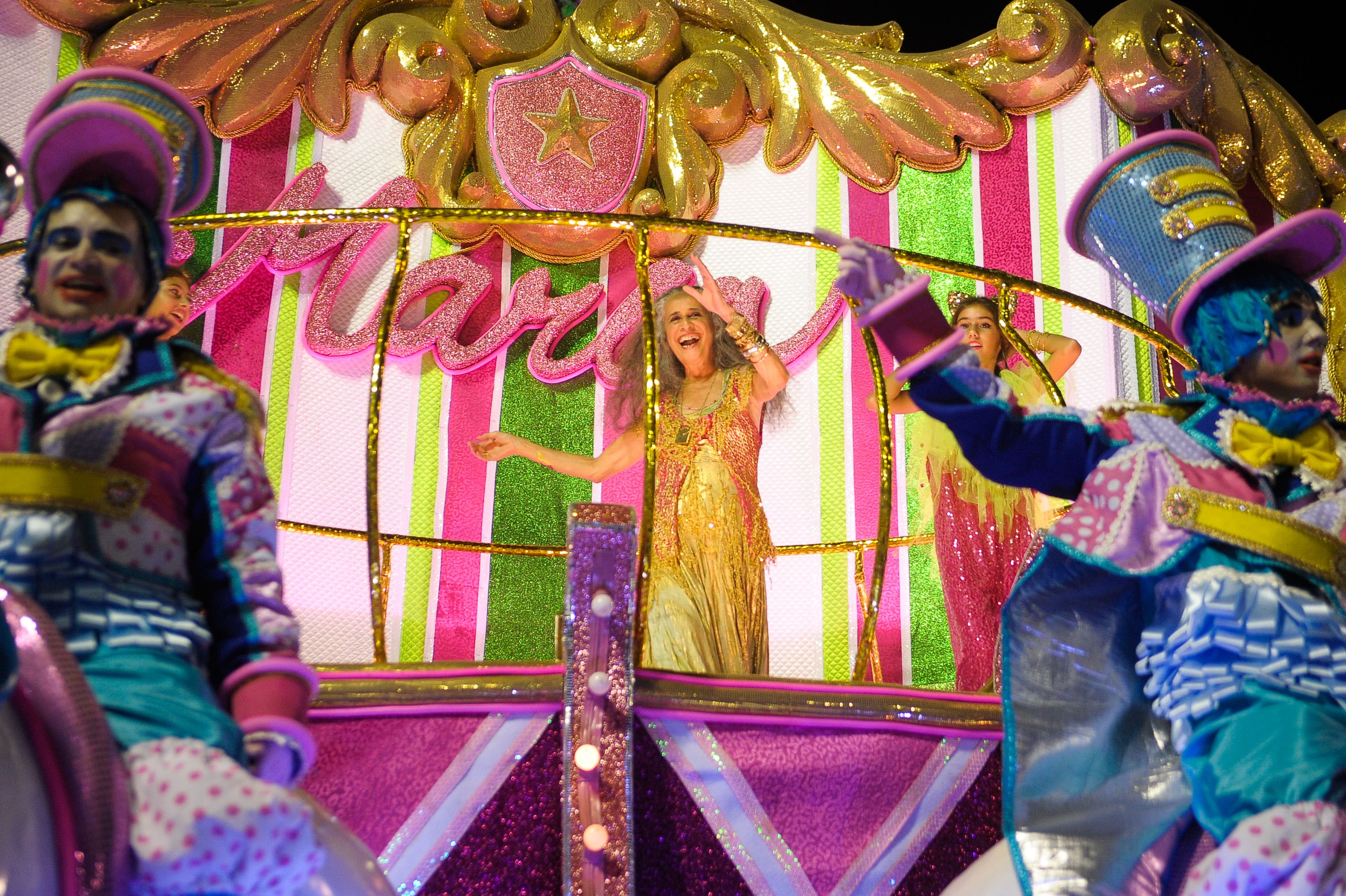
Maria Bethânia parades by hose in the carnival of 2016 (Tomaz Silva/Agência Brasil)

This is a list of the results of all the Rio Carnival parades in 2016. In the Special Group, only 35 scores were considered because judge Fabiano Rock did not score the battery (percussion) category due to an alleged personal relationship with the duo

== Grupo Especial ==
Pos	According to the rules, judges must not have personal or professi.nal relationships with the	Classification or relegation	
1	Estação Primeira de Mangueira	269.8	Carnival Champion
2	Unidos da Tijuca	269.7	Champions Parade
3	Portela	269.7	Champions Parade
4	Acadêmicos do Salgueiro	269.5	Champions Parade
5	Beija-Flor	269.3	Champions Parade
6	Imperatriz Leopoldinense	269.2	Champions Parade
7	Acadêmicos do Grande Rio	268.7	
8	Unidos de Vila Isabel	267.9	
9	São Clemente	267.8	
10	Mocidade Independente de Padre Miguel	266.5	
11	União da Ilha do Governador	265.8	
12	Estácio de Sá	265	Relegation to 2017 Série A

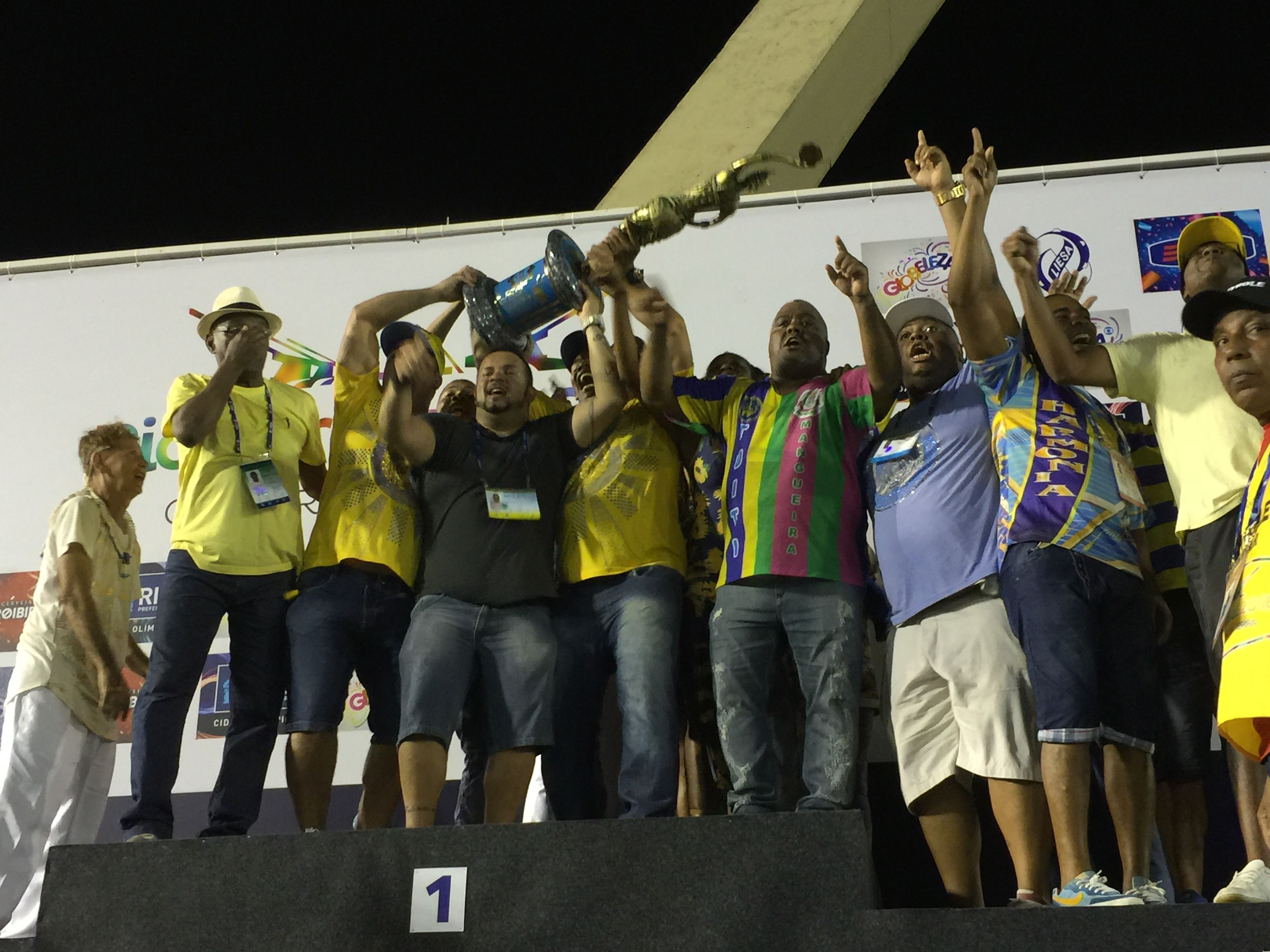
Members of the Paraíso do Tuiuti with the trophy in champion of Serie A 2016

== Série A ==
Pos	Samba schools	Pts	Classification or relegation
1	Paraíso do Tuiuti	269.9	Promotion to 2017 Grupo Especial
2	Unidos de Padre Miguel	269.2	
3	Unidos do Viradouro	268.3	
4	Império Serrano	268.3	
5	Unidos do Porto da Pedra	267.9	
6	Acadêmicos do Cubango	267.8	
7	Império da Tijuca	267.7	
8	Renascer de Jacarepaguá	266.5	
9	Inocentes de Belford Roxo	266.1	
10	Alegria da Zona Sul	265.9	
11	União do Parque Curicica	265.6	
12	Acadêmicos de Santa Cruz	265.3	
13	Acadêmicos da Rocinha	263.5	
14	Caprichosos de Pilares	262	Relegation to 2017 Série B

== Série B ==
Pos	Samba schools	Pts	Classification or relegation
1	Acadêmicos do Sossego	269.5	Promotion to 2017 Série A
2	Tradição	269.3	
3	Leão de Nova Iguaçu	269.2	
4	Em Cima da Hora	268.8	
5	Arame de Ricardo	268.7	
6	Unidos de Bangu	268.7	
7	Mocidade Unida do Santa Marta	268.5	
8	Unidos do Jacarezinho	268.1	
9	Unidos da Ponte	268,1	
10	Corações Unidos do Favo de Acari	268	
11	Unidos do Cabuçu	267.9	
12	Acadêmicos do Engenho da Rainha	267.8	
13	União de Jacarepaguá	267.4	Relegation to 2017 Série C
14	Unidos de Lucas	266.8	Relegation to 2017 Série C
15	Arranco	265.5	Relegation to 2017 Série C
16	Unidos das Vargens	265.3	Relegation to 2017 Série C

== Grupo C ==
Pos	Samba schools	Pts	Classification or relegation
1	Vizinha Faladeira	269.3	Promotion to 2017 Série B
2	Coroado de Jacarepaguá	268.9	
3	Arrastão de Cascadura	268.6	
4	União de Maricá	268.4	
5	Boca de Siri	268.4	
6	Sereno de Campo Grande	267.9	
7	Lins Imperial	267.8	
8	Unidos da Vila Kennedy	267.1	
9	Unidos da Vila Santa Tereza	267.1	
10	Mocidade Unida da Cidade de Deus	266.2	Relegation to 2017 Série D
11	Acadêmicos do Dendê	265	Relegation to 2017 Série D
12	Acadêmicos da Abolição	264.3	Relegation to 2017 Série D
13	Rosa de Ouro	260.8	Relegation to 2017 Série D

== Grupo D ==
Pos	Samba schools	Pts	Classification or relegation
1	Flor da Mina do Andaraí	269.9	Promotion to 2017 Série C
2	Acadêmicos de Vigário Geral	269.1	Promotion to 2017 Série C
3	Império da Uva	268.2	
4	Chatuba de Mesquita	268.1	
5	Mocidade Independente de Inhaúma	267.8	
6	Difícil é o Nome	267.8	
7	Unidos de Cosmos	267.1	
8	Unidos da Villa Rica	266.8	
9	Alegria do Vilar	266.1	
10	Matriz de São João de Meriti	265.2	
11	Unidos de Manguinhos	264.2	
12	Império da Zona Oeste	262.5	Relegation to 2017 Série E
13	Gato de Bonsucesso	261.6	Relegation to 2017 Série E
14	Mocidade de Vicente de Carvalho	232.8	Relegation to 2017 Série E

== Grupo E ==
Pos	Samba schools	Pts	Classification or relegation
1	Nação Insulana	179.9	Promotion to 2017 Série D
2	Tupy de Brás de Pina	179.5	Promotion to 2017 Série D
3	Império Ricardense	179.4	
4	Acadêmicos de Madureira	179.4	
5	Embalo Carioca	179.3	
6	Boêmios de Inhaúma	179	
7	Cabral	178.6	
8	Bohêmios da Cinelândia	177.8	
9	Unidos de Três Corações	177.8	
10	Colibri de Mesquita	177.8	
11	Boi da Ilha do Governador	177.3	
12	Delírio da Zona Oeste	175	
13	Chora na Rampa	170.6	
14	União de Vaz Lobo	87.1	
15	Zambear	0.0	Suspended to parade

== See also ==
- Results of the 2016 São Paulo Carnival
