= Renato Lage =

Brazilian carnival organizer (born 1949)

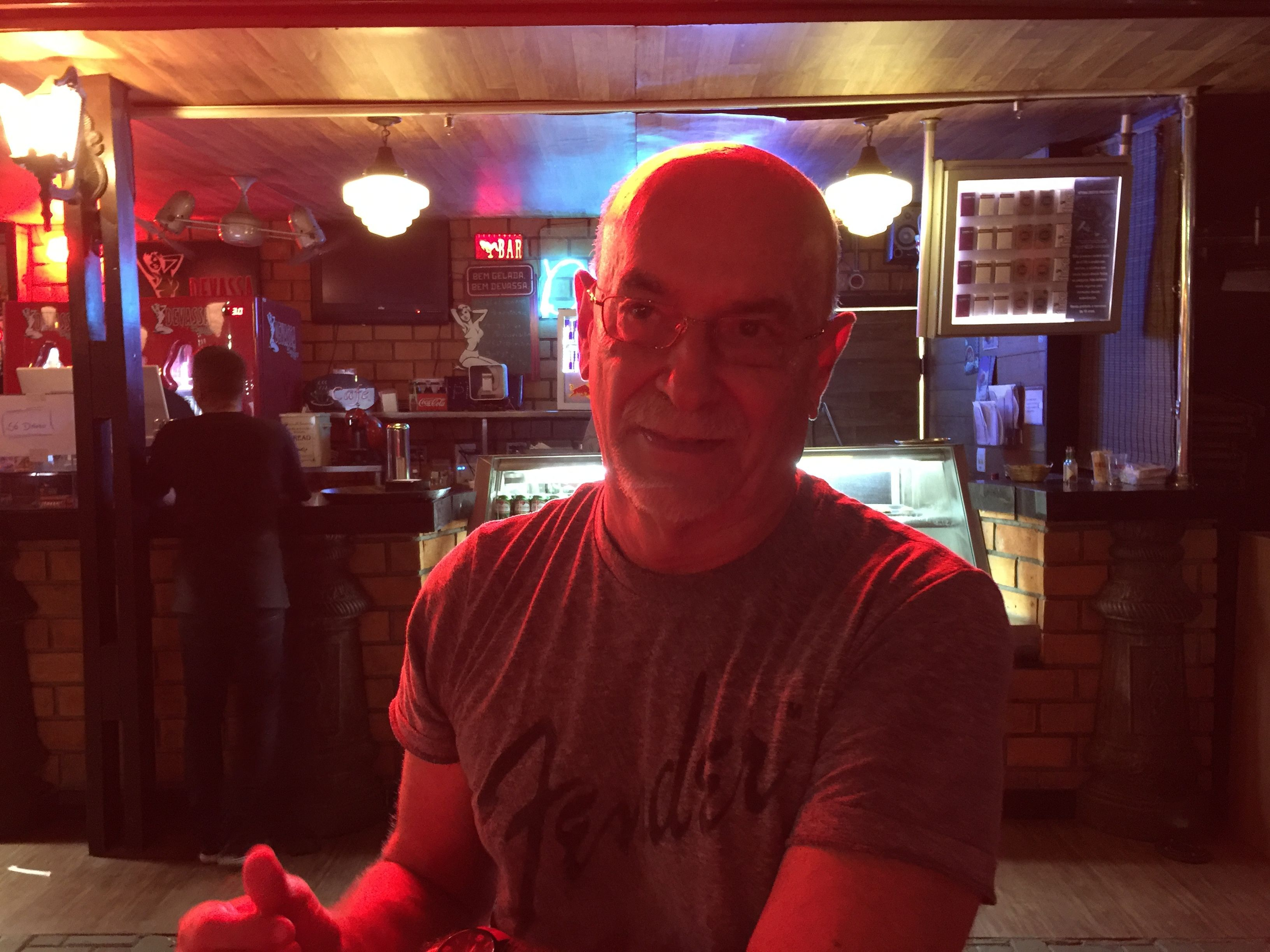
- Born: Renato Rui de Souza Lage; 21 May 1949 (age 77); Rio de Janeiro, Brazil
- Occupations: Set designer, carnival organizer
- Years active: 1979–present
- Spouse: Márcia Lage

Renato Rui de Souza Lage (born 21 May 1949) is a Brazilian carnival organizer with the Rio Carnival. He worked extensively with his wife, Márcia Lage.

He helped to develop high-tech technologies for usage in the design of carnival blocs for the Rio Carnival, particularly during the 1990s with his partnership with Lilian Rabello. He has been involved with the Rio Carnival since 1979, winning four titles in the Grupo Especial.

== Biography ==
Lage was born on 21 May 1949 in Rio de Janeiro. He began to participate in carnivals in 1978 as a support member and chief of allegories with Salgueiro, then led by Fernando Pamplona. Beginning in 1979, he began his solo career with Unidos da Tijuca, with the group achieving their advancement to group 1B that year, with an enredo about Delmiro Gouveia, in homage to the visionary industrialist from Brazil's Northeast. Lage met Rabello leaving the Escola de Artes do Parque Lage and asked for her to work with him. They stayed with Tijuca until 1982. In 1983, Lage went with Rabello to Império Serrano, a traditional samba school based in the Madureira neighborhood.

In his first year as a carnival organizer with Império Serrano, he developed costumes and allegories for the enredo by Fernando Pamplona "Mãe, Baiana Mãe", developed and researched by Rabello, about the traditional habits of people from the state of Bahia. The enredo also gained media attention and attention by the public in general for the way in which the daily routine of the senhoras of samba were portrayed. Starting in 1985, he began develop the enredos created and developed by Rabello, forming a duo. Lage would remain with Império until 1986. In 1987, he returned to Salgueiro, where he would develop the carnival bloc for the enredo "E por quê não?", authored by Rabello, becoming a precursor to the bold artistic style that would consecrate them years later with Mocidade Independente de Padre Miguel. The following year, Lage and Rabello would transfer over to Caprichosos, making two more enredos with Rabello.

In 1990, Castor de Andrade returned to Mocidade after two years and started a plan to reformulate the school based out of Padre Miguel. This came after a period in which they dealt with bad results and the loss of one of their biggest names, Fernando Pinto, due to an automobile accident. Andrade invited Lage and Rabello, along with set designer and television director Maurício Sherman to develop an enredo about the turning of the decade. The unfolding of events, along with the strong expectations that came with the return of Andrade to the school, made the enredo symbolically not just about the turn of the decade but of the return of Mocidade, which intended to start the 1990s renewed and on a strong note. To that end, Sherman was dismissed and Lage and Rabello gave a start to the conception of that year's winning enredo, "Vira-Virou, a Mocidade Chegou". The enredo was a profound look back at the school's past, recounting moments from its inception by members of a football team, Independente Futebol Clube, them winning their first title, their legendary bateria, memorable blocs and their biggest names, such as Arlindo Rodrigues and Fernando Pinto, along with the unforgettable Mestre André. They were also known for their participations with Mocidade in the carnivals of 1991, 1992, 1996, 1997, 1999 and 2002.

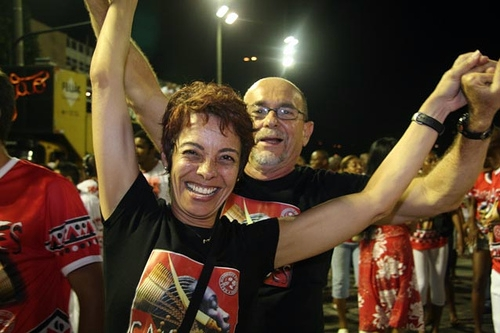
Renato developed various enredos with his wife, Márcia Lage

In 2003, Lage returned to Salgueiro in time for its 50-year anniversary. In 2007, Lage worked simultaneously in two samba schools, with both Salgueiro and with the commission for Império de Casa Verde, in São Paulo, together with his wife Márcia Lage and other members.

In 2008, he repeated the feat, but this time working for Império Serrano, becoming the champions for Grupo de acesso A, along with being the vice-champion in the Special Group along with Salgueiro. In 2009, Salgueiro won the competition with the enredo "Tambor", becoming the most memorable performance at Sapucaí and the school was successful by the public and critically. In 2011, he made an enredo about cinema in Rio de Janeiro, having made giant designs such as a replica of King Kong at Central do Brasil metro station. The bloc proved to be difficult to work on in terms of the harmony and delayed the launching of the bloc. In 2012, he had another dual performance as along with Salgueiro (where he became a vice-champion), Lage also became a carnival organizer with Império da Zona Norte, reaching third place for the Porto Alegre-based school. In 2013, he made the enredo "Fama", earning 4th place. He later would become vice-champion, in a partnership with his wife Márcia Lage for the enredo "Gaia, a vida em nossas mãos".

In 2016, he would repeat the partnership with Márcia, developing with her the bloc for Vai-Vai, along with remaining in Salgueiro. He continued working with his wife for two years after with Grande Rio. In 2019, they were hired by Portela going into Carnival 2020. The year after, they developed the enredo "Guajupiá, Terra Sem Males" for the historic samba school. The bloc was corrected and without setbacks, but the school came in a disappointing seventh place, frustrating those who were awaiting a better result. Even with that, the Lages continued with Portela for 2021 and had announced the theme: Igi Osé Baobá, which told the story of and portrayed the symbology of the baobabs, giant, long-living trees originating in Africa. They came in 5th place. They would be contracted again for 2022, but Portela would come in 10th place. They would be released from Portela after a mutual agreement was made.

== Carnivals ==
Listed below are the carnival blocs designed by Lage:

Year	School	Place	Division	Enredo	Ref.
1980	Unidos da Tijuca	Champion	Grupo 1-B	Delmiro Gouveia	
1981	Unidos da Tijuca	8th place	Grupo 1-A	Macobeba – O que dá pra rir, dá pra chorar	
1982	Unidos da Tijuca	9th place	Grupo 1-A	Lima Barreto – Mulato pobre, mas livre	
1983	Império Serrano	3rd place	Grupo 1-A	Mãe, baiana mãe	
1984	Império Serrano	Vice-champion	Grupo 1-A	Foi Malandro é	
1985	Império Serrano	7th place	Grupo 1-A	Samba, Suor e Cerveja, o combustível da ilusão	
1986	Império Serrano	3rd place	Grupo 1-A	Eu Quero	
1987	Salgueiro	5th place	Grupo 1	E por que não?	
1988	Caprichosos	8th place	Grupo 1	Luz, Câmera e Ação	
1989	Caprichosos	12th place	Grupo 1	O que é bom todo mundo gosta	
1990	Mocidade	Champion	Especial RJ	Vira virou, a Mocidade chegou	
1991	Mocidade	Champion	Especial RJ	Chuê, Chuá, as águas vão rolar	
1992	Mocidade	Vice-champion	Especial RJ	Sonhar não custa nada ou quase nada	
1993	Mocidade	4th place	Especial RJ	Marraio, feridô sou rei	
1994	Mocidade	8th place	Especial RJ	Avenida Brasil, tudo passa, quem não viu?	
1995	Mocidade	4th place	Especial RJ	Padre Miguel: olhai por nós!	
1996	Mocidade	Champion	Especial RJ	Criador e Criatura	
1997	Mocidade	Vice-champion	Especial RJ	De Corpo e Alma na avenida	
1998	Mocidade	6th place	Especial RJ	Brilha no céu a estrela que me faz sonhar	
1999	Mocidade	4th place	Especial RJ	Villa-Lobos e a apoteose brasileira	
2000	Mocidade	4th place	Especial RJ	Verde, Amarelo, Azul-Anil colorem o Brasil no ano 2000	
2001	Mocidade	7th place	Especial RJ	Paz e Harmonia, Mocidade é alegria	
2002	Mocidade	4th place	Especial RJ	O Grande Circo Místico	
2003	Salgueiro	7th place	Especial RJ	Salgueiro, minha paixão, minha raiz – 50 anos de glórias	
2004	Salgueiro	6th place	Especial RJ	A cana que aqui se planta, tudo dá, até energia... Álcool, o combustível do futuro	
2005	Salgueiro	5th place	Especial RJ	Do fogo que ilumina a vida, Salgueiro é chama que não se apaga	
2006	Salgueiro	11th place	Especial RJ	Microcosmos: o que os olhos não veem, o coração sente	
2007	Salgueiro	7th place	Especial RJ	Candaces	
2007	Império de Casa Verde	5th place	Especial SP	Glórias e Conquistas – A Força do Império está no salto do Tigre	
2008	Salgueiro	Vice-champion	Especial	O Rio de Janeiro continua sendo...	
2008	Império Serrano	Champion	Grupo A	Taí, eu fiz tudo para você gostar de mim	
2009	Salgueiro	Champion	Especial RJ	Tambor!	
2010	Salgueiro	5th place	Especial RJ	Histórias sem fim	
2011	Salgueiro	5th place	Especial RJ	Salgueiro Apresenta: o Rio no Cinema	
2012	Salgueiro	Vice-champion	Especial RJ	Cordel branco e encarnado	
2012	Império da Zona Norte	3rd place	Especial (POA)	O Império contra-ataca	
2013	Salgueiro	5th place	Especial RJ	Fama	
2014	Salgueiro	Vice-champion	Especial RJ	Gaia – A vida em nossas mãos	
2015	Salgueiro	Vice-champion	Especial RJ	Do Fundo do Quintal, Saberes e Sabores na Sapucaí	
2016	Salgueiro	4th place	Especial RJ	A Ópera dos Malandros	
2016	Vai-Vai	4th place	Especial SP	Je Suis Vai-Vai – Bem-vindos à França	
2017	Salgueiro	3rd place	Especial RJ	A Divina Comédia Do Carnaval	
2018	Grande Rio	12th place	Especial RJ	Vai para o trono ou não vai?	
2019	Grande Rio	9th place	Especial RJ	Quem nunca...? Que atire a primeira pedra	
2020	Portela	7th place	Especial RJ	Guajupiá, Terra sem Males	
2022	Portela	5th place	Especial RJ	Igi Osè Baobá	
2023	Portela	10th place	Especial RJ	O azul que vem do infinito	
2025	Mocidade		Especial RJ	Voltando para o futuro – Não há limites pra sonhar	
2026	Mocidade				

== Titles ==
Group	Champion	Year	Second	Year	Third	Year
First Division (RJ)	4	1990, 1991, 1996, 2009	7	1984, 1992, 1997, 2008, 2012, 2014, 2015	2	1986, 2017
Second Division (RJ)	2	1980, 2008	0	–	0	–

== Awards ==
- Gold Standard
1. 1981 – Best enredo (Unidos da Tijuca – "Macobeba – O que dá pra rir, dá pra chorar")
2. 1995 – Best enredo (Mocidade – "Padre Miguel: Olhai por Nós!")
3. 1996 – Best enredo (Mocidade – "Criador e Criatura")
4. 1999 – Best enredo (Mocidade – "Villa-Lobos e a Apoteose Brasileira")
5. 2002 – Personality
6. 2006 – Best enredo (Salgueiro – "Microcosmos: o que os olhos não veem, o coração sente")
7. 2009 – Best enredo (Salgueiro – "Tambor")
8. 2013 – Best enredo (Salgueiro – "Fama")
9. 2016 – Best enredo (Salgueiro – "A Ópera dos Malandros")
- Star of the Carnaval
1. 2009 – Best carnival organizer (Salgueiro)
2. 2009 – Best group of costumes (Salgueiro)
3. 2011 – Best group of allegories (Salgueiro)
4. 2013 – Best group of costumes (Salgueiro)
5. 2014 – Best group of costumes (Salgueiro)
6. 2015 – Best group of costumes (Salgueiro)
7. 2016 – Best enredo (Salgueiro – "A Ópera dos Malandros")
- Silver Cat
1. 2011 – Best enredo ("Salgueiro Apresenta: o Rio no Cinema")
2. 2015 – Best carnival organizer (Salgueiro)
- Plumas & Paetês Cultural
1. 2009 – Best carnival organizer (Salgueiro)
2. 2011 – Best designer (Salgueiro)
3. 2012 – Best carnival organizer (Salgueiro)
- 100% Carnaval Award
1. 2022 – Best group of costumes (Portela)
- Veja Rio Award
1. 2014 – Best allegory (Abre-alas do Salgueiro)
- S@mba-Net
1. 2007 – Special prize (for his contributions to the Rio Carnival)
2. 2022 – Best group of costumes (Portela)
- Tamborim de Ouro
1. 1999 – Best group of allegories (Mocidade)
2. 1999 – Best group of costumes (Mocidade)
3. 2000 – Beleza de Mensagem (Enredo of Mocidade – "Verde, Amarelo, Azul-Anil Colorem o Brasil no Ano 2000")
4. 2001 – Beleza de Mensagem (Enredo of Mocidade – "Paz e Harmonia, Mocidade É Alegria")
5. 2014 – Enredo Maravilha (Salgueiro – "Gaia – A Vida em Nossas Mãos")
6. 2014 – Best group of allegories (Salgueiro)
- Andarilho do Samba Trophy
1. 2008 – Best enredo (Império Serrano – "Taí, Eu Fiz Tudo para Você Gostar de Mim")
- Jorge Lafond Trophy
1. 2008 – Best enredo (Império Serrano – "Taí, Eu Fiz Tudo para Você Gostar de Mim")
- Manchete Trophy – Papa-Tudo
1. 1996 – Best carnival organizer (Mocidade)
2. 1998 – Best carnival organizer (Mocidade)
3. 1998 – Best enredo (Mocidade – "Brilha no Céu a Estrela que Me Faz Sonhar")
- Sambario Trophy
1. 2009 – Best enredo (Salgueiro – "Tambor")
2. 2011 – Best allegory (King Kong at Relógio da Central)
- Tupi Carnaval Total Trophy
1. 2011 – Best carnival organizer (Salgueiro)
2. 2022 – Best group of costumes (Portela)
