= Results of the 2017 Rio Carnival =

This page includes results relevant to the 2017 Rio Carnival.

== Grupo Especial ==
Pos	Samba schools	Pts	Classification or relegation
1	Portela	269.9	Carnival Champion
1	Mocidade Independente de Padre Miguel	269.8	Carnival Champion
3	Acadêmicos do Salgueiro	269.7	Champions Parade
4	Estação Primeira de Mangueira	269.6	Champions Parade
5	Acadêmicos do Grande Rio	269.4	Champions Parade
6	Beija-Flor	269.2	Champions Parade
7	Imperatriz Leopoldinense	268.5	
8	União da Ilha do Governador	267.8	
9	São Clemente	267.4	
10	Unidos de Vila Isabel	267.4	
11	Unidos da Tijuca	266.8	
12	Paraíso do Tuiuti	264.6	

== Série A ==
Pos	Samba schools	Pts	Classification or relegation
1	Império Serrano	269.8	Promotion to 2018 Grupo Especial
2	Unidos do Viradouro	269.3	
3	Estácio de Sá	269.1	
4	Unidos de Padre Miguel	268.9	
5	Unidos do Porto da Pedra	268.2	
6	Acadêmicos da Rocinha	266.6	
7	Império da Tijuca	266.3	
8	Acadêmicos do Cubango	265.6	
9	Inocentes de Belford Roxo	265.2	
10	Renascer de Jacarepaguá	265.1	
11	Acadêmicos do Sossego	264.5	
12	Acadêmicos de Santa Cruz	264.2	
13	Alegria da Zona Sul	263.3	
14	União do Parque Curicica	260.6	Relegation to 2018 Série B

== Série B ==
Pos	Samba schools	Pts	Classification or relegation
1	Unidos de Bangu	269.1	Promotion to 2018 Série A
2	Unidos do Cabuçu	269	
3	Tradição	268.9	
4	Arame de Ricardo	268.9	
5	Em Cima da Hora	268.7	
6	Acadêmicos do Engenho da Rainha	268.6	
7	Vizinha Faladeira	268.5	
8	Unidos da Ponte	268.4	
9	Unidos do Jacarezinho	268.2	
10	Leão de Nova Iguaçu	267.7	Relegation to 2018 Série C
11	Caprichosos de Pilares	266.2	Relegation to 2018 Série C
12	Favo de Acari	265.3	Relegation to 2018 Série C
13	Mocidade Unida do Santa Marta	262.1	Relegation to 2018 Série C

== Série C ==
Pos	Samba schools	Pts	Classification or relegation
1	Unidos das Vargens	269.4	Promotion to 2018 Série B
2	Lins Imperial	269.4	Promotion to 2018 Série B
3	Acadêmicos de Vigário Geral	269.2	Promotion to 2018 Série B
4	Unidos de Lucas	269.2	
5	Boca de Siri	269	
6	Arranco	269	
7	Sereno de Campo Grande	268.8	
8	Unidos da Vila Santa Tereza	268.8	
9	União de Maricá	268.5	
10	Unidos da Vila Kennedy	268.4	
11	União de Jacarepaguá	268.3	Relegation to 2018 Série D
12	Coroado de Jacarepaguá	266.6	Relegation to 2018 Série D
13	Arrastão de Cascadura	266.4	Relegation to 2018 Série D
14	Flor da Mina do Andaraí	266.1	Relegation to 2018 Série D

== Série D ==
Pos	Samba schools	Pts	Classification or relegation
1	Império da Uva	269.4	Promotion to 2018 Série C
2	Rosa de Ouro	269.2	Promotion to 2018 Série C
3	Difícil é o Nome	268.9	Promotion to 2018 Série C
4	Chatuba de Mesquita	268.5	
5	Mocidade Independente de Inhaúma	268.2	
6	Alegria do Vilar	267.6	
7	Unidos de Cosmos	267.5	
8	Tupy de Brás de Pina	267.3	
9	Unidos da Villa Rica	266.9	
10	Acadêmicos da Abolição	266.6	
11	Unidos de Manguinhos	266.6	Relegation to 2018 Série E
12	Acadêmicos do Dendê	268.5	Relegation to 2018 Série E
13	Nação Insulana	264.4	Relegation to 2018 Série E
14	Mocidade Unida da Cidade de Deus	263.5	Relegation to 2018 Série E
15	Matriz de São João de Meriti	0.0	Relegation to 2018 Série E

== Série E ==
Pos	Samba schools	Pts	Classification or relegation
1	Império Ricardense	169.7	Promotion to 2018 Série D
2	Acadêmicos de Madureira	169.5	Promotion to 2018 Série D
3	Corações Unidos do Amarelinho	169.4	Promotion to 2018 Série D
4	Acadêmicos do Jardim Bangu	169.2	
5	Gato de Bonsucesso	168.6	
6	Boêmios de Inhaúma	167.9	
7	Feitiço do Rio	167.6	
8	Colibri de Mesquita	167.5	
9	Boi da Ilha do Governador	166.9	Suspended
10	Embalo Carioca	166.4	Suspended
11	Delírio da Zona Oeste	165.9	Suspended
12	Chora na Rampa	165.5	Suspended
13	Unidos do Cabral	165.2	Suspended
14	Unidos do Salgueiro	163.3	Suspended
15	Acadêmicos de Pilares	152.9	Suspended

== See also ==
- Results of the 2017 São Paulo Carnival
