= Results of the 2012 Rio Carnival =

This page lists the 2012 Rio Carnival results. Notably, the Liga das Escolas de Samba do Grupo de Acesso (LESGA) was relieved by RioTur for not adhering to the regulations of the Grupo de acesso parade, wherein LESGA did not relegate two schools from Group A to Group B. LESGA responded to this by stating that "it has not yet been officially notified of the decision". LESGA's reasons for not relegating was due to "a lack of funds transferred in time" and the "uncertainties of the location of the school barracks". These barracks had been previously "evicted" from Carandiru, a former warehouse that was developed by the City of Rio de Janeiro to develop Porto Maravilha for the 2016 Summer Olympics. Afterwards, LESGA was renamed to the Liga das Escolas de Samba do Rio de Janeiro (LIERJ), which unified Groups A and B to form the Série A.

== Grupo Especial ==
Pos	Samba schools	Pts	Classification or relegation
1	Unidos da Tijuca	299.9	Carnival Champion
2	Acadêmicos do Salgueiro	299.7	Champions Parade
3	Unidos de Vila Isabel	299.5	Champions Parade
4	Beija-Flor	298.9	Champions Parade
5	Acadêmicos do Grande Rio	298.3	Champions Parade
6	Portela	297.2	Champions Parade
7	Estação Primeira de Mangueira	297	
8	União da Ilha do Governador	296.2	
9	Mocidade Independente de Padre Miguel	295.8	
10	Imperatriz Leopoldinense	295	
11	São Clemente	294.7	
12	Unidos do Porto da Pedra	291.7	Relegation to 2013 Série A
13	Renascer de Jacarepaguá	290.2	Relegation to 2013 Série A

== Grupo A ==
Pos	Samba schools	Pts	Classification or relegation
1	Inocentes de Belford Roxo	299.6	Promotion to 2013 Grupo Especial
2	Império Serrano	298.3	Form the 2013 Série A
3	Império da Tijuca	298.3	Form the 2013 Série A
4	Acadêmicos do Cubango	298	Form the 2013 Série A
5	Unidos do Viradouro	297.8	Form the 2013 Série A
6	Acadêmicos de Santa Cruz	297.3	Form the 2013 Série A
7	Estácio de Sá	297.2	Form the 2013 Série A
8	Acadêmicos da Rocinha	296.1	Form the 2013 Série A
9	Paraíso do Tuiuti	296	Form the 2013 Série A

== Grupo B ==
Pos	Samba schools	Pts	Classification or relegation
1	Caprichosos de Pilares	300	Form the 2013 Série A
2	Alegria da Zona Sul	299.2	Form the 2013 Série A
3	Unidos de Padre Miguel	298.9	Form the 2013 Série A
4	Sereno de Campo Grande	296.7	Form the 2013 Série A
5	Tradição	296.3	Form the 2013 Série A
6	União do Parque Curicica	295.6	Form the 2013 Série A
7	Unidos da Vila Santa Tereza	293.8	Form the 2013 Série A
8	União de Jacarepaguá	293.2	Form the 2013 Série A
9	Mocidade de Vicente de Carvalho	292.8	Remain in 2013 Grupo B
10	Difícil é o Nome	292.5	Remain in 2013 Grupo B
11	Arranco	291.2	Remain in 2013 Grupo B

== Grupo C ==
Pos	Samba schools	Pts	Classification or relegation
1	Unidos do Jacarezinho	299.6	Promotion to 2013 Série A
2	Unidos da Villa Rica	299	About the 2013 Grupo B
3	Unidos da Vila Kennedy	298.7	About the 2013 Grupo B
4	Em Cima da Hora	298.3	About the 2013 Grupo B
5	Império da Praça Seca	298.1	About the 2013 Grupo B
6	Acadêmicos do Sossego	298.1	About the 2013 Grupo B
7	Favo de Acari	297.7	About the 2013 Grupo B
8	Unidos da Ponte	297.6	About the 2013 Grupo B
9	Rosa de Ouro	297.3	About the 2013 Grupo B
10	Boi da Ilha do Governador	295.3	About the 2013 Grupo B
11	Arrastão de Cascadura	294.6	Remain in 2013 Grupo C
12	Unidos do Cabuçu	294.4	Remain in 2013 Grupo C
13	Acadêmicos da Abolição	291.6	Remain in 2013 Grupo C
14	Lins Imperial	287.6	Remain in 2013 Grupo C

== Grupo D ==
Pos	Samba schools	Pts	Classification or relegation
1	Unidos de Lucas	299.7	Promotion to 2013 Grupo B
2	Mocidade Unida da Cidade de Deus	299.5	About the 2013 Grupo C
3	Acadêmicos de Vigário Geral	299.1	About the 2013 Grupo C
4	Acadêmicos do Dendê	298.7	About the 2013 Grupo C
5	Acadêmicos do Engenho da Rainha	298.7	About the 2013 Grupo C
6	Corações Unidos do Amarelinho	297.5	About the 2013 Grupo C
7	Gato de Bonsucesso	297.3	About the 2013 Grupo C
8	Unidos de Cosmos	296.6	Remain in 2013 Grupo D
9	Leão de Nova Iguaçu	295.4	Remain in 2013 Grupo D
10	Unidos do Anil	294.4	Remain in 2013 Grupo D
11	Unidos de Manguinhos	293	Remain in 2013 Grupo D
12	Vizinha Faladeira	291.7	Remain in 2013 Grupo D
13	Flor da Mina do Andaraí	286.7	Remain in 2013 Grupo D

== Grupo E ==
Pos	Samba schools	Pts	Classification or relegation
1	Boca de Siri	299.9	Promotion to 2013 Grupo C
2	Chatuba de Mesquita	299.9	About the 2013 Grupo D
3	Mocidade Unida do Santa Marta	299	About the 2013 Grupo D
4	Matriz de São João de Meriti	299	About the 2013 Grupo D
5	Arame de Ricardo	298.4	About the 2013 Grupo D
6	Mocidade Independente de Inhaúma	297.3	About the 2013 Grupo D
7	Unidos do Cabral	294.6	Carnival block and suspended
8	Imperial de Nova Iguaçu	293.6	Carnival block and suspended
9	União de Vaz Lobo	287.8	Carnival block and suspended
10	Delírio da Zona Oeste	282.3	Carnival block and suspended
11	Canários das Laranjeiras	274	Carnival block and suspended
