= Results of the 2010 Rio Carnival =

This page includes results relevant to the 2010 Rio Carnival.

== Grupo Especial ==
Pos	Samba schools	Pts	Classification or relegation
1	Unidos da Tijuca	299.9	Carnival Champion
2	Acadêmicos do Grande Rio	269.5	Champions Parade
3	Beija-Flor	299.2	Champions Parade
4	Unidos de Vila Isabel	298.1	Champions Parade
5	Acadêmicos do Salgueiro	298	Champions Parade
6	Estação Primeira de Mangueira	297.4	Champions Parade
7	Mocidade Independente de Padre Miguel	296.1	
8	Imperatriz Leopoldinense	295.8	
9	Portela	295.2	
10	Unidos do Porto da Pedra	294	
11	União da Ilha do Governador	293.8	
12	Unidos do Viradouro	290.5	Relegation to 2011 Grupo A

== Grupo A ==
Pos	Samba schools	Pts	Classification or relegation
1	São Clemente	270	Promotion to 2011 Grupo Especial
2	Inocentes de Belford Roxo	268.7	
3	Estácio de Sá	268.6	
4	Acadêmicos de Santa Cruz	268.2	
5	Império da Tijuca	268.1	
6	Império Serrano	267.9	
7	Caprichosos de Pilares	267.5	
8	Renascer de Jacarepaguá	267.2	
9	Acadêmicos do Cubango	267.2	
10	Acadêmicos da Rocinha	267	
11	Unidos de Padre Miguel	263.3	Relegation to 2011 Grupo B
12	Paraíso do Tuiuti	262.7	Relegation to 2011 Grupo B

== Grupo Rio de Janeiro 1 ==
Pos	Samba schools	Pts	Classification or relegation
1	Alegria da Zona Sul	270	Promotion to 2011 Grupo A
2	Arranco	269.8	
3	União do Parque Curicica	269.1	
4	Sereno de Campo Grande	269	
5	União de Jacarepaguá	269	
6	Acadêmicos do Sossego	268.7	
7	Tradição	268.2	
8	Lins Imperial	268.1	
9	Mocidade de Vicente de Carvalho	267.8	
10	Unidos do Jacarezinho	266.7	Relegation to 2011 Grupo C
11	Boi da Ilha do Governador	266.3	Relegation to 2011 Grupo C
12	Flor da Mina do Andaraí	260.2	Relegation to 2011 Grupo C

== Grupo Rio de Janeiro 2 ==
Pos	Samba schools	Pts	Classification or relegation
1	Independente da Praça da Bandeira	179.6	Promotion to 2011 Grupo B
2	Difícil é o Nome	179.5	Promotion to 2011 Grupo B
3	Unidos da Vila Kennedy	179.1	
4	Unidos do Cabuçu	179.1	
5	Vizinha Faladeira	177.8	
6	Acadêmicos da Abolição	177.7	
7	Arrastão de Cascadura	177.3	
8	Unidos da Vila Santa Tereza	176.7	
9	Unidos da Ponte	176.7	
10	Corações Unidos do Amarelinho	176.3	
11	Acadêmicos do Engenho da Rainha	176.1	
12	Unidos de Cosmos	175.5	Relegation to 2011 Grupo D
13	Acadêmicos do Dendê	174.3	Relegation to 2011 Grupo D
14	Unidos de Manguinhos	148.1	Relegation to 2011 Grupo D

== Grupo Rio de Janeiro 3 ==
Pos	Samba schools	Pts	Classification or relegation
1	Em Cima da Hora	179.9	Promotion to 2011 Grupo C
2	Difícil é o Nome	179.5	Promotion to 2011 Grupo C
3	Unidos da Villa Rica	179.5	Promotion to 2011 Grupo C
4	Favo de Acari	179.3	Promotion to 2011 Grupo C
5	Gato de Bonsucesso	177.7	
6	Mocidade Unida do Santa Marta	177.2	
7	Mocidade Unida da Cidade de Deus	176.5	
8	Delírio da Zona Oeste	176.2	
9	Imperial de Nova Iguaçu	176.2	
10	Unidos do Anil	176.1	
11	Acadêmicos de Vigário Geral	174.2	
12	Mocidade Independente de Inhaúma	174.1	
13	Unidos de Lucas	173.2	Relegation to 2011 Grupo E
14	União de Vaz Lobo	171.3	Relegation to 2011 Grupo E
15	Unidos do Cabral	127.6	Relegation to 2011 Grupo E

== Grupo Rio de Janeiro 4 ==
Pos	Samba schools	Pts	Classification or relegation
1	Leão de Nova Iguaçu	180	Promotion to 2011 Grupo D
2	Império da Praça Seca	179.9	Promotion to 2011 Grupo D
3	Paraíso da Alvorada	176.5	
4	Boêmios de Inhaúma	176.5	
5	Infantes da Piedade	176	
6	Canários das Laranjeiras	175.3	
7	Arame de Ricardo	174.1	
8	Unidos do Uraiti	153.5	2011 Carnival Block
