= Results of the 2011 Rio Carnival =

This page includes the results relevant to the Rio Carnival in 2011.

== Grupo Especial ==
Pos	Samba schools	Pts	Classification or relegation
1	Beija-Flor	299.8	Carnival Champion
2	Unidos da Tijuca	298.4	Champions Parade
3	Estação Primeira de Mangueira	297.2	Champions Parade
4	Unidos de Vila Isabel	297	Champions Parade
5	Acadêmicos do Salgueiro	296.2	Champions Parade
6	Imperatriz Leopoldinense	295.5	Champions Parade
7	Mocidade Independente de Padre Miguel	295.5	
8	Unidos do Porto da Pedra	293.4	
9	São Clemente	290.9	
	Acadêmicos do Grande Rio	HC	
	União da Ilha do Governador	HC	
	Portela	HC	

== Grupo A ==
Pos	Samba schools	Pts	Classification or relegation
1	Renascer de Jacarepaguá	299.9	Promotion to 2012 Grupo Especial
2	Unidos do Viradouro	299	
3	Estácio de Sá	298.7	
4	Acadêmicos do Cubango	298.2	
5	Acadêmicos de Santa Cruz	297.7	
6	Império Serrano	297.3	
7	Império da Tijuca	297.2	
8	Inocentes de Belford Roxo	297.1	
9	Acadêmicos da Rocinha	297.1	
10	Caprichosos de Pilares	293.9	Relegation to 2012 Grupo B
11	Alegria da Zona Sul	291.8	Relegation to 2012 Grupo B

== Grupo B ==
Pos	Samba schools	Pts	Classification or relegation
1	Paraíso do Tuiuti	299.4	Promotion to 2012 Grupo A
2	União do Parque Curicica	298.2	
3	Unidos de Padre Miguel	298.1	
4	Arranco	298	
5	Sereno de Campo Grande	297.8	
6	União de Jacarepaguá	297.6	
7	Tradição	296.7	
8	Difícil é o Nome	295.9	
9	Mocidade de Vicente de Carvalho	295.1	
10	Acadêmicos do Sossego	294.9	Relegation to 2012 Grupo C
11	Independente da Praça da Bandeira	294.7	Relegation to 2012 Grupo C
12	Lins Imperial	292.9	Relegation to 2012 Grupo C

== Grupo C ==
Pos	Samba schools	Pts	Classification or relegation
1	Unidos da Vila Santa Tereza	299.1	Promotion to 2012 Grupo B
2	Favo de Acari	299.1	
3	Arrastão de Cascadura	299	
4	Rosa de Ouro	298.9	
5	Em Cima da Hora	298.9	
6	Unidos do Jacarezinho	298.2	
7	Unidos do Cabuçu	297.8	
8	Boi da Ilha do Governador	297.6	
9	Unidos da Villa Rica	296.8	
10	Unidos da Vila Kennedy	296.5	
11	Unidos da Ponte	296	
12	Acadêmicos da Abolição	295.1	
13	Acadêmicos do Engenho da Rainha	295.1	Relegation to 2012 Grupo D
14	Corações Unidos do Amarelinho	293.2	Relegation to 2012 Grupo D
15	Flor da Mina do Andaraí	291.7	Relegation to 2012 Grupo D
16	Vizinha Faladeira	290.6	Relegation to 2012 Grupo D

== Grupo D ==
Pos	Samba schools	Pts	Classification or relegation
1	Império da Praça Seca	299.6	Promotion to 2012 Grupo C
2	Mocidade Unida da Cidade de Deus	299.4	
3	Acadêmicos do Dendê	299.1	
4	Unidos de Manguinhos	298.7	
5	Acadêmicos de Vigário Geral	298.5	
6	Leão de Nova Iguaçu	298.2	
7	Unidos de Cosmos	296.3	
8	Unidos do Anil	296	
9	Gato de Bonsucesso	293.7	
10	Delírio da Zona Oeste	293.5	Relegation to 2012 Grupo E
11	Imperial de Nova Iguaçu	292.5	Relegation to 2012 Grupo E
12	Mocidade Independente de Inhaúma	292.5	Relegation to 2012 Grupo E
13	Mocidade Unida do Santa Marta	288.5	Relegation to 2012 Grupo E

== Grupo E ==
Pos	Samba schools	Pts	Classification or relegation
1	Unidos de Lucas	300	Promotion to 2012 Grupo D
2	Matriz de São João de Meriti	299.7	
3	Unidos do Cabral	299.1	
4	União de Vaz Lobo	298.5	
5	Chatuba de Mesquita	298.4	
6	Arame de Ricardo	294	
7	Paraíso da Alvorada	293.5	
8	Canários das Laranjeiras	291.9	
9	Boêmios de Inhaúma	288	Carnival block
10	Unidos do Uraiti	277	Carnival block
11	União de Guaratiba	256.3	Carnival block
12	Infantes da Piedade	220.2	Carnival block
