= Results of the 2013 Rio Carnival =

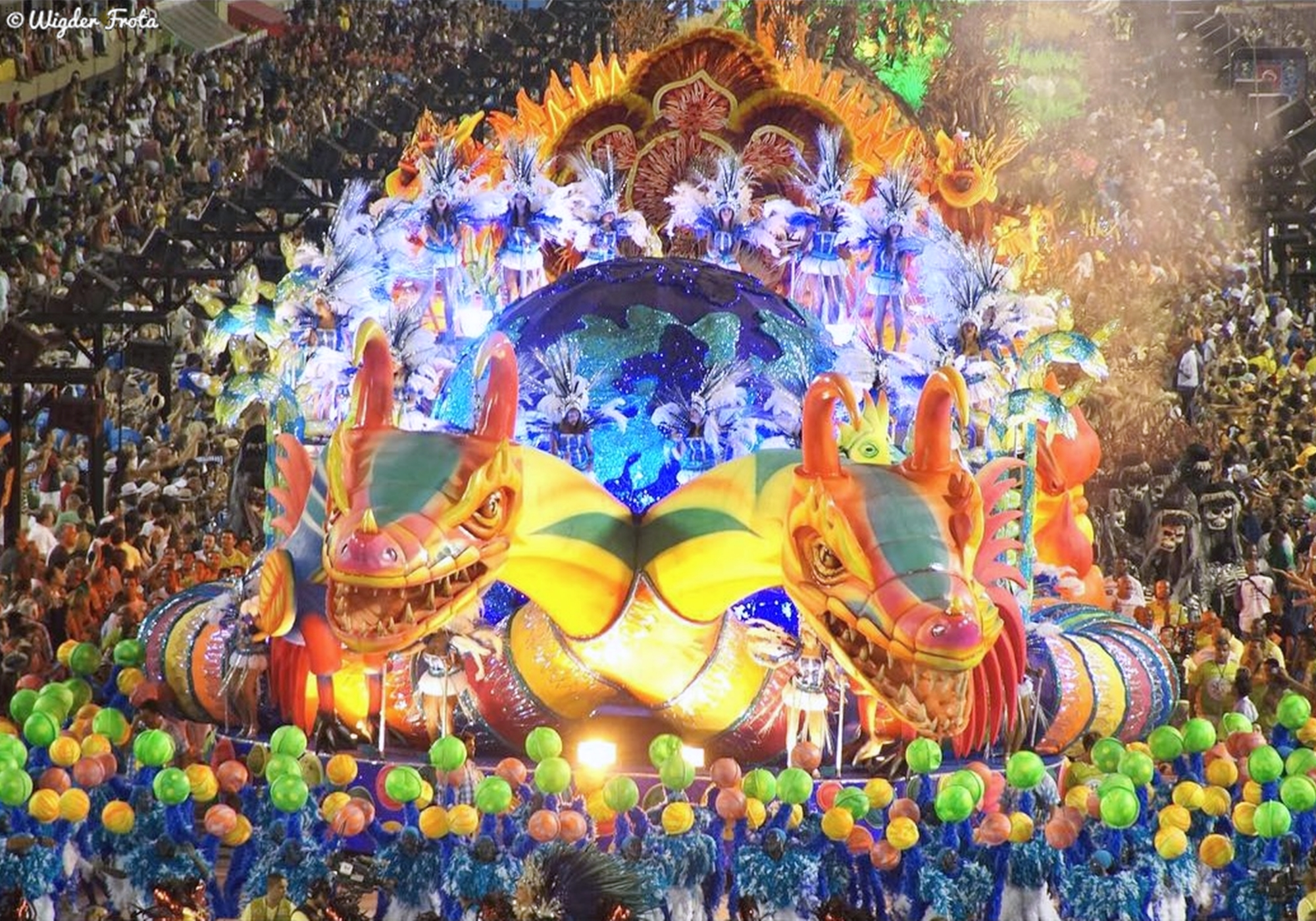

This page includes results relevant to the 2013 Rio Carnival.

== Grupo Especial ==
Pos	Samba schools	Pts	Classification or relegation
1	Unidos de Vila Isabel	299.7	Carnival Champion
2	Beija-Flor	299.4	Champions Parade
3	Unidos da Tijuca	299.2	Champions Parade
4	Imperatriz Leopoldinense	298.3	Champions Parade
5	Acadêmicos do Salgueiro	297.9	Champions Parade
6	Acadêmicos do Grande Rio	297.2	Champions Parade
7	Portela	296.6	
8	Estação Primeira de Mangueira	296.5	
9	União da Ilha do Governador	294.9	
10	São Clemente	293.5	
11	Mocidade Independente de Padre Miguel	293.5	
12	Inocentes de Belford Roxo	291.1	Relegation to 2014 Série A

== Série A ==
Pos	Samba schools	Pts	Classification or relegation
1	Império da Tijuca	300	Promotion to 2014 Grupo Especial
2	Unidos do Viradouro	299.6	
3	Império Serrano	299.5	
4	Estácio de Sá	299.5	
5	Acadêmicos da Rocinha	299.3	
6	Caprichosos de Pilares	299	
7	Unidos de Padre Miguel	298.2	
8	Renascer de Jacarepaguá	298.2	
9	Unidos do Porto da Pedra	297.4	
10	Acadêmicos de Santa Cruz	297.3	
11	Acadêmicos do Cubango	297	
12	União do Parque Curicica	297	
13	Paraíso do Tuiuti	296.7	
14	Alegria da Zona Sul	296.4	
15	União de Jacarepaguá	296.2	
16	Tradição	295.8	
17	Sereno de Campo Grande	295.3	Relegation to 2014 Grupo B
18	Unidos do Jacarezinho	290.1	Relegation to 2014 Grupo B
19	Unidos da Vila Santa Tereza	287.5	Relegation to 2014 Grupo B

== Grupo B ==
Pos	Samba schools	Pts	Classification or relegation
1	Em Cima da Hora	298.8	Promotion to 2014 Série A
2	Arranco	298.5	
3	Império da Praça Seca	298.4	
4	Favo de Acari	298.4	
5	Acadêmicos do Sossego	298.1	
6	Unidos de Lucas	297.5	
7	Unidos da Vila Kennedy	296.6	
8	Unidos da Ponte	295.8	
9	Unidos da Villa Rica	295.5	Relegation to 2014 Grupo C
10	Difícil é o Nome	294.2	Relegation to 2014 Grupo C
11	Rosa de Ouro	294.1	Relegation to 2014 Grupo C
12	Boi da Ilha do Governador	293.9	Relegation to 2014 Grupo C
13	Mocidade de Vicente de Carvalho	293.5	Relegation to 2014 Grupo C

== Grupo C ==
Pos	Samba schools	Pts	Classification or relegation
1	Unidos do Cabuçu	299.6	Promotion to 2014 Grupo B
2	Unidos de Bangu	299	Promotion to 2014 Grupo B
3	Acadêmicos do Engenho da Rainha	298.7	Promotion to 2014 Grupo B
4	Mocidade Unida da Cidade de Deus	298.6	
5	Acadêmicos do Dendê	298.4	
6	Boca de Siri	297.7	
7	Acadêmicos da Abolição	296.9	
8	Acadêmicos de Vigário Geral	296.5	Relegation to 2014 Grupo D
9	Arrastão de Cascadura	295.8	Relegation to 2014 Grupo D
10	Lins Imperial	295.5	Relegation to 2014 Grupo D
11	Gato de Bonsucesso	292.6	Relegation to 2014 Grupo D
12	Corações Unidos do Amarelinho	292.4	Relegation to 2014 Grupo D

== Grupo D ==
Pos	Samba schools	Pts	Classification or relegation
1	Mocidade Unida do Santa Marta	299.5	Promotion to 2014 Grupo C
2	Leão de Nova Iguaçu	299.1	Promotion to 2014 Grupo C
3	Arame de Ricardo	298	Promotion to 2014 Grupo C
4	Unidos de Cosmos	297.2	
5	Unidos de Manguinhos	296.1	
6	Matriz de São João de Meriti	296.1	
7	Unidos do Anil	296	
8	Chatuba de Mesquita	295.3	
9	Mocidade Independente de Inhaúma	295.3	
10	Vizinha Faladeira	294.8	Carnival block and suspended
11	Flor da Mina do Andaraí	294.4	Carnival block and suspended
12	Tradição Barreirense de Mesquita	293.3	Carnival block and suspended
