= Results of the 2014 Rio Carnival =

This page are listed the results of all of the Rio Carnival on year 2014.

== Grupo Especial ==
Pos	Samba schools	Pts	Classification or relegation
1	Unidos da Tijuca	299.4	Carnival Champion
2	Acadêmicos do Salgueiro	299.3	Champions Parade
3	Portela	299	Champions Parade
4	União da Ilha do Governador	298.4	Champions Parade
5	Imperatriz Leopoldinense	297.6	Champions Parade
6	Acadêmicos do Grande Rio	297.2	Champions Parade
7	Beija-Flor	296.4	
8	Estação Primeira de Mangueira	296.2	
9	Mocidade Independente de Padre Miguel	296	
10	Unidos de Vila Isabel	295.9	
11	São Clemente	294.3	
12	Império da Tijuca	291.6	Relegation to 2015 Série A

== Série A ==
Pos	Samba schools	Pts	Classification or relegation
1	Unidos do Viradouro	299.9	Promotion to 2015 Grupo Especial
2	Estácio de Sá	299.4	
3	Unidos de Padre Miguel	298.8	
4	Unidos do Porto da Pedra	298.7	
5	Acadêmicos do Cubango	298.6	
6	Império Serrano	298.1	
7	União do Parque Curicica	297.8	
8	Paraíso do Tuiuti	297.5	
9	Caprichosos de Pilares	296.5	
10	Inocentes de Belford Roxo	296.2	
11	Renascer de Jacarepaguá	295.5	
12	Acadêmicos de Santa Cruz	295.4	
13	Em Cima da Hora	294	
14	Alegria da Zona Sul	293.5	
15	União de Jacarepaguá	292.9	Relegation to 2015 Série B
16	Acadêmicos da Rocinha	292.6	Relegation to 2015 Série B
17	Tradição	291.9	Relegation to 2015 Série B

== Grupo B ==
Pos	Samba schools	Pts	Classification or relegation
1	Unidos de Bangu	299.6	Promotion to 2015 Série A
2	Unidos do Cabuçu	299.2	
3	Favo de Acari	298.8	
4	Acadêmicos do Engenho da Rainha	298.7	
5	Acadêmicos do Sossego	298.5	
6	Sereno de Campo Grande	298.5	
7	Arranco	298.2	
8	Unidos do Jacarezinho	298.1	
9	Unidos da Vila Santa Tereza	297.8	
10	Unidos da Ponte	297.4	
11	Unidos de Lucas	296.8	
12	Unidos da Vila Kennedy	295.9	
13	Império Rubro-Negro	249.9	Relegation to 2015 Grupo C

== Grupo C ==
Pos	Samba schools	Pts	Classification or relegation
1	Mocidade Unida do Santa Marta	299.8	Promotion to 2015 Grupo B
2	Arame de Ricardo	299.3	Promotion to 2015 Grupo B
3	Rosa de Ouro	299.2	Promotion to 2015 Grupo B
4	Acadêmicos da Abolição	298.9	Promotion to 2015 Grupo B
5	Mocidade de Vicente de Carvalho	298.9	
6	Unidos da Villa Rica	298.8	
7	Difícil é o Nome	298.6	
8	Leão de Nova Iguaçu	298.4	
9	Boca de Siri	298.3	
10	Mocidade Unida da Cidade de Deus	297.8	
11	Acadêmicos do Dendê	297.3	
12	Boi da Ilha do Governador	295.5	Relegation to 2015 Grupo D

== Grupo D ==
Pos	Samba schools	Pts	Classification or relegation
1	Unidos das Vargens	299.7	Promotion to 2015 Grupo C
2	Lins Imperial	299.5	Promotion to 2015 Grupo C
3	Unidos de Manguinhos	299.4	Promotion to 2015 Grupo C
4	Arrastão de Cascadura	299	Promotion to 2015 Grupo C
5	Unidos de Cosmos	298.9	
6	Unidos do Anil	298.9	
7	Corações Unidos do Amarelinho	298.8	
8	Acadêmicos de Vigário Geral	298.6	
9	Matriz de São João de Meriti	297.5	
10	Chatuba de Mesquita	297.4	
11	Gato de Bonsucesso	294.3	
12	Mocidade Independente de Inhaúma	286	
