= Results of the 2017 São Paulo Carnival =

This page are listed the results of all of the São Paulo Carnival on year 2017.

== Grupo Especial ==
Pos	Samba schools	Pts	Classification or relegation
1	Acadêmicos do Tatuapé	269.7	Carnival Champion
2	Dragões da Real	269.7	Champions Parade
3	Vai-Vai	269.4	Champions Parade
4	Império de Casa Verde	269.4	Champions Parade
5	Rosas de Ouro	269.3	Champions Parade
6	Mocidade Alegre	269.2	
7	Unidos de Vila Maria	269	
8	Acadêmicos do Tucuruvi	268.8	
9	Gaviões da Fiel	268.8	
10	Mancha Verde	268.7	
11	Unidos do Peruche	268.4	
12	Tom Maior	268.3	
13	Águia de Ouro	268.3	Relegation to 2018 Grupo 1
14	Nenê de Vila Matilde	260.6	Relegation to 2018 Grupo 1

== Grupo de acesso ==
Pos	Samba schools	Pts	Classification or relegation
1	X-9 Paulistana	269.2	Promotion to 2018 Grupo Especial
2	Independente Tricolor	268.9	Promotion to 2018 Grupo Especial
3	Colorado do Brás	268.9	Form the 2018 Grupo 1
4	Camisa Verde e Branco	268.3	Form the 2018 Grupo 1
5	Leandro de Itaquera	267.7	Form the 2018 Grupo 1
6	Pérola Negra	267.6	Form the 2018 Grupo 1
7	Imperador do Ipiranga	267.5	Form the 2018 Grupo 1
8	Estrela do Terceiro Milênio	267	Relegation to 2018 Grupo 2

== Grupo 1 ==
Pos	Samba schools	Pts	Classification or relegation
1	Barroca Zona Sul	180.3	Promotion to 2018 Grupo 1
2	Mocidade Unida da Mooca	180.1	Form the 2018 Grupo 2
3	Dom Bosco	179.8	Form the 2018 Grupo 2
6	Unidos de Santa Bárbara	179.7	Form the 2018 Grupo 2
5	Morro da Casa Verde	179.5	Form the 2018 Grupo 2
6	Amizade da Zona Leste	179.1	Form the 2018 Grupo 2
7	Tradição Albertinense	179.1	Form the 2018 Grupo 2
8	Uirapuru da Mooca	178.7	Form the 2018 Grupo 2
9	Combinados de Sapopemba	178.2	Form the 2018 Grupo 2
10	Torcida Jovem	176.9	Form the 2018 Grupo 2
11	Flor de Lis da Zona Sul	176	Relegation to 2018 Grupo Especial de Bairro
12	Prova de Fogo	172.5	Relegation to 2018 Grupo Especial de Bairro

== Grupo 2 ==
Pos	Samba schools	Pts	Classification or relegation
1	Camisa 12	269	Promotion to 2019 Grupo 2
2	Brinco da Marquesa	268.4	Promotion to 2019 Grupo 2
3	União Imperial	268.3	Form the 2018 Grupo Especial de Bairro
4	Unidos de São Lucas	268	Form the 2018 Grupo Especial de Bairro
5	Boêmios da Vila	267.9	Form the 2018 Grupo Especial de Bairro
6	União Independente da Zona Sul	267.7	Form the 2018 Grupo Especial de Bairro
7	Acadêmicos de São Jorge	267.6	Form the 2018 Grupo Especial de Bairro
8	Império Lapeano	267.5	Form the 2018 Grupo Especial de Bairro
9	Flor da Vila Dalila	267.4	Form the 2018 Grupo Especial de Bairro
10	Unidos do Vale Encantado	266.6	Form the 2018 Grupo Especial de Bairro
11	União da Vila Albertina	266.3	Relegation to 2018 Grupo 1 de Bairro
12	Imperatriz da Sul	265.2	Relegation to 2018 Grupo 1 de Bairro

== Grupo 3 ==
Pos	Samba schools	Pts	Classification or relegation
1	Acadêmicos do Ipiranga	179.9	Promotion to 2018 Grupo Especial de Bairro
2	Primeira da Cidade Líder	179.6	Promotion to 2018 Grupo Especial de Bairro
3	Unidos de São Miguel	178.8	Form the Grupo 1 de Bairro
4	Príncipe Negro	178.7	Form the Grupo 1 de Bairro
5	Iracema Meu Grande Amor	178.4	Form the Grupo 1 de Bairro
6	Mocidade Robruense	178.4	Form the Grupo 1 de Bairro
7	Em Cima da Hora Paulistana	178.3	Form the Grupo 1 de Bairro
8	Imperatriz da Paulicéia	178.3	Form the Grupo 1 de Bairro
9	Dragões de Vila Alpina	178	Form the Grupo 1 de Bairro
10	Passo de Ouro	177.2	Form the Grupo 1 de Bairro
11	Estação Invernada	176.7	Relegation to 2018 Grupo 2 de Bairro
12	Lavapés	157.1	Relegation to 2018 Grupo 2 de Bairro

== Grupo 4 ==
Pos	Samba schools	Pts	Classification or relegation
1	Valença de Perus	179.4	Relegation to 2018 Grupo 1 de Bairro
2	Só Vou se Você For	179.2	Relegation to 2018 Grupo 1 de Bairro
3	Primeira da Aclimação	178.8	Form the Grupo 2 de Bairro
4	Torcida Uniformizada do Palmeiras	178.8	Form the Grupo 2 de Bairro
5	Unidos de Guaianases	178.7	Form the Grupo 2 de Bairro
6	Os Bambas	178.6	Form the Grupo 2 de Bairro
7	Estrela Cadente	178.4	Form the Grupo 2 de Bairro
8	Explosão da Zona Norte	178.4	Form the Grupo 2 de Bairro
9	Cabeções de Vila Prudente	178.3	Form the Grupo 2 de Bairro
10	Cacique do Parque	178.2	Form the Grupo 2 de Bairro
11	Isso Memo	177.5	Form the Grupo 2 de Bairro
12	Portela da Zona Sul	166.6	Suspended
13	Folha Verde	165.9	Suspended

== See also ==
- Results of the 2017 Rio Carnival
