= Cubango =

Cubango may refer to the following places and jurisdictions :

- Okavango River
  - Cubango Province in Angola
  - the Apostolic Prefecture of Lower Congo in Cubango, former Catholic missionary jurisdiction
  - the former Catholic Apostolic Prefecture of Cubango in Angola (originally (Upper) Cimbebasia (in Portuguese Angola)), suppressed into the Diocese of Nova Lisboa)
- Cubango, Niterói, a neighborhood in the city of Niteroi, Brazil
