= LIERJ =

League of Samba Schools of the Rio de Janeiro

The Liga das Escolas de Samba do Rio de Janeiro (LIERJ; English: League of Samba Schools of Rio de Janeiro) is the leading association that organizes the Série A Group and its samba schools for parades in the Carnival in Rio de Janeiro.

On 15 July 2008, seven presidents of the Grupo de Acesso (Access Group) association separated from the Associação das Escolas de Samba da Cidade do Rio de Janeiro (AESCRJ, responsible for lower-tier Access Groups) and founded the Liga das Escolas de Samba do Grupo de Acesso (LESGA). Its purpose was to collaborate on various projects and manage parades, particularly for samba schools in the higher-tier Access Group A.

After the associations separated, a rift between LESGA and AESCRJ occurred due to disagreements on school and Group standings. LESGA's regulation mandated that two schools would be relegated from Access Group A, while promoting two schools from Access Group B; which was managed by AESCRJ, who mandated that only one school should move up or down tiers. Further disagreement continued as the Cubango and Padre Miguel schools were involved in a tie-breaker calculation.

RioTur mediated between the two associations, where an agreement was reached between AESCRJ and LESGA, which dictated that there would only be 12 samba schools that would take part in the 2010 Carnival parade. Furthermore, two schools would be relegated to the lower tier Group B (Grupo Rio de Janeiro 1), and two schools would be promoted to Group A. This agreement continued into 2011. In 2012, the school champion of Group B (affiliated with LESGA) was promoted to Group A, and the school champion who belonged to the Liga Independente das Escolas de Samba do Rio de Janeiro (LIESA, English: Independent League of the Samba Schools of Rio de Janeiro), was delegated to become a member of LESGA. Due to LESGA's systematic issues, the 2012 parade was not organized and therefore did not occur. Déo Pessoa then won LESGA's election, months after which LESGA's name was changed to LIERJ.

Various samba schools that had previously missed the Carnival migrated to LIERJ with government approval. Due to internal conflict, AESCRJ was subsidized, leading to Group B's administration by LIESB. While the last placed school for the year is placed under LIESB's Group B Series (Silver Division 1), the A Series (Gold Division) champion advances as a full member of LIESA and its Special Group.

== Presidents ==
Name	Took office	Left office
Reginaldo Gomes	2008	2012
Déo Pessoa	2012	2018
Renato Thor	2018	2019
Wallace Palhares	2019	Incumbent

== Série Ouro ==
- Em Cima da Hora
- Acadêmicos do Cubango
- Unidos da Ponte
- Unidos do Porto da Pedra
- União da Ilha do Governador
- Unidos de Bangu
- Acadêmicos do Sossego
- Lins Imperial
- Inocentes de Belford Roxo
- Estácio de Sá
- Acadêmicos de Santa Cruz
- Unidos de Padre Miguel
- Acadêmicos de Vigário Geral
- Império da Tijuca
- Império Serrano

== Second division champions ==
- 1952 – Unidos do Indaiá (1)
- 1953 – Acadêmicos do Engenho da Rainha (1)
- 1954 – Beija-Flor (1)
- 1955 – União de Jacarepaguá (1)
- 1955 – Paz e Amor (1)
- 1956 – Lins Imperial (1)
- 1956 – União do Centenário (1)
- 1957 – Unidos de Bangu (1)
- 1958 – Mocidade Independente de Padre Miguel (1)
- 1959 – Unidos de Padre Miguel (1)
- 1960 – Caprichosos de Pilares (1)
- 1961 – Unidos do Cabuçu (1)
- 1962 – Unidos de Bangu (2)
- 1963 – Unidos da Capela (1)
- 1964 – Império da Tijuca (1)
- 1965 – Acadêmicos de Santa Cruz (1)
- 1966 – São Clemente (1)
- 1967 – Estácio de Sá (1)
- 1968 – Em Cima da Hora (1)
- 1969 – Acadêmicos de Santa Cruz (2)
- 1970 – Império da Tijuca (2)
- 1971 – Em Cima da Hora (2)
- 1972 – Tupy de Brás de Pina (1)
- 1973 – Estácio de Sá (2)
- 1974 – União da Ilha do Governador (1)
- 1975 – Lins Imperial (2)
- 1976 – Império da Tijuca (3)
- 1977 – Arrastão de Cascadura (1)
- 1978 – Estácio de Sá (3)
- 1979 – Unidos de Vila Isabel (1)
- 1980 – Unidos da Tijuca (1)
- 1981 – Estácio de Sá (4)
- 1982 – Caprichosos de Pilares (2)
- 1983 – Estácio de Sá (5)
- 1984 – Unidos do Cabuçu (2)
- 1985 – Unidos da Ponte (1)
- 1986 – Unidos do Jacarezinho (1)
- 1987 – Unidos da Tijuca (2)
- 1988 – Arranco (1)
- 1989 – Acadêmicos de Santa Cruz (3)
- 1990 – Unidos do Viradouro (1)
- 1991 – Tradição (1)
- 1992 – Acadêmicos do Grande Rio (1)
- 1993 – Tradição (2)
- 1994 – Unidos da Villa Rica (1)
- 1995 – Unidos do Porto da Pedra (1)
- 1996 – Acadêmicos de Santa Cruz (4)
- 1997 – Tradição (3)
- 1998 – Império Serrano (1)
- 1999 – Unidos da Tijuca (3)
- 2000 – Império Serrano (2)
- 2001 – Unidos do Porto da Pedra (2)
- 2002 – Acadêmicos de Santa Cruz (5)
- 2003 – São Clemente (2)
- 2004 – Unidos de Vila Isabel (2)
- 2005 – Acadêmicos da Rocinha (1)
- 2006 – Estácio de Sá (6)
- 2007 – São Clemente (3)
- 2008 – Império Serrano (3)
- 2009 – União da Ilha do Governador (2)
- 2010 – São Clemente (4)
- 2011 – Renascer de Jacarepaguá (1)
- 2012 – Innocentes de Belford Roxo (1)
- 2013 – Império da Tijuca (4)
- 2014 – Unidos do Viradouro (2)
- 2015 – Estácio de Sá (7)
- 2016 – Paraíso do Tuiuti (1)
- 2017 – Império Serrano (4)
- 2018 – Unidos do Viradouro (3)
- 2019 – Estácio de Sá (8)
- 2020 – Imperatriz Leopoldinense (1)
