= Cubango, Niterói =

Neighborhood in Niterói, Brazil

Coordinates: 22.891°S 43.097°W

See Cubango for namesakes, notably in Africa

Cubango is a neighborhood located in the northwest of the city Niterói, Rio de Janeiro (state), Brazil. It is famous for hosting the samba school Acadêmicos do Cubango that competes in the Rio Carnival.
