= Acadêmicos da Rocinha =

- Foundation: 31 March 1988; 36 years ago
- Blessing school: Vila Isabel

The Grêmio Recreativo Escola de Samba Acadêmicos da Rocinha is a samba school in Rio de Janeiro, located in the neighborhood of São Conrado on Bertha Lutz street.

== History ==
The Academic Rocinha samba school comes from three carnivals of favela da Rocinha, the "Empire of the Topsail", "Young Blood" and "United Rocinha". The Scholars of Rocinha's symbol is the butterfly, and the colors are blue, green and white.

It paraded for the first time as a samba school in 1989 by Group 4 in Intendente Magalhães in Campinho, with the carnival Joãosinho Trinta. That year the school was crowned champion and ascended to the Joãosinho Trinta. Two more championships in a row by Group 3. in 1990 and Group 2 in 1991 led to Group 1 where it remained until 1996, when it won second place, which earned it the right to march for the first time in the Special.

Since 2002, the Academic Rocinha has remained in Group A and in 2005, with the plot "Um mundo sem fronteiras", the school became champion of the Grupo de acesso A. This guaranteed the right to march again in 2006 by the Grupo Especial. The school group finished the show with 371.7 points.

In carnival 2008, the auxiliary Max Lopes debuted in a carnival at Mangueira, Fábio Ricardo. That year Rocinha was runner-up, behind the Império Serrano, the champion.

In 2009, the school of São Conrado honored cartoonist J. Carlos with the plot has francesinha the hall .. The river in my heart, getting 3rd place with 239 points, staying in the Grupo de acesso A 2010.

For Carnival 2010, Rocinha returned Fábio Ricardo to the carnival, seeking another access to the panel with the plot Ykamiabas (copyright), based on the book Ykamiabas - Daughters of the Moon, Women of the Earth. It told the story of women warriors who came to the Amazon ten thousand years ago.

== Persons who parade for the school ==
- Adriane Galisteu
- Mônica Nascimento
- Luiza Brunet
- Patrícia Amorim
- Mel Fronckowiak

== Classifications ==
Year	Place	Division	Plot	Carnivals Producers
Year	Place	Division	Plot	Singers
1989	Champion	Grupo 4	O Esplendor dos Divinos Orixás	Joãosinho Trinta
1989	Champion	Grupo 4	O Esplendor dos Divinos Orixás	Zezé da Rocinha
1990	Champion	Grupo C	Um Coração Chamado Brasil	Joãosinho Trinta
1990	Champion	Grupo C	Um Coração Chamado Brasil	Zezé da Rocinha
1991	Champion	Grupo B	Do esplendor da Roma Pagã ao despertar da Rocinha	Joãosinho Trinta
1991	Champion	Grupo B	Do esplendor da Roma Pagã ao despertar da Rocinha	Zezé da Rocinha
1992	5th place	Grupo A	Para não dizer que não falei das flores	Carlinhos D'Andrade
1992	5th place	Grupo A	Para não dizer que não falei das flores	Rixxah
1993	6th place	Grupo A	Tristão e Isolda - Uma ópera no asfalto	Carlinhos D'Andrade
1993	6th place	Grupo A	Tristão e Isolda - Uma ópera no asfalto	Zezé da Rocinha
1994	3rd place	Grupo A	Humor pra dar e vender	Luis Fernando Abreu
1994	3rd place	Grupo A	Humor pra dar e vender	Jorge Mirim
1995	4th place	Grupo A	Sem Medo de ser Feliz	Alexandre Louzada
1995	4th place	Grupo A	Sem Medo de ser Feliz	Jorge Mirim
1996	Vice-Champion	Grupo A	Bahia com muito Amor	Gil Ricon
1996	Vice-Champion	Grupo A	Bahia com muito Amor	Niltinho Oliveira
1997	16th place	Grupo Especial	A viagem fantástica do Zé Carioca à Disney	Flávio Tavares; Miguel Falabella
1997	16th place	Grupo Especial	A viagem fantástica do Zé Carioca à Disney	Alexandre D'Mendes
1998	9th place	Grupo A	Tá na ponta da língua	Albeci Pereira; Carlos Negri
1998	9th place	Grupo A	Tá na ponta da língua	André Luiz
1999	Champion	Grupo B	1999, fim do século! Recordar é viver	Carnival Commission
1999	Champion	Grupo B	1999, fim do século! Recordar é viver	André Luiz
2000	9th place	Grupo A	O sonho da França Antártica de Villegagnon	Luciano Costa
2000	9th place	Grupo A	O sonho da França Antártica de Villegagnon	Zezé da Rocinha
2001	Champion	Grupo B	E Deus criou a Mulher	Luciano Costa
2001	Champion	Grupo B	E Deus criou a Mulher	Zezé da Rocinha
2002	3rd place	Grupo A	Na Rocinha, 'O Povo' é sempre notícia	Luciano Costa
2002	3rd place	Grupo A	Na Rocinha, 'O Povo' é sempre notícia	Zezé da Rocinha
2003	10th place	Grupo A	Nas asas da realização, entre glórias e tradições, a Rocinha faz a festa dos 100 anos de campeão... Sou tricolor de coração!	Luciano Costa
2003	10th place	Grupo A	Nas asas da realização, entre glórias e tradições, a Rocinha faz a festa dos 100 anos de campeão... Sou tricolor de coração!	Carlinhos de Pilares
2004	3rd place	Grupo A	O Mago do Novo, João do povo	Alex de Souza
2004	3rd place	Grupo A	O Mago do Novo, João do povo	Carlinhos de Pilares
2005	Champion	Grupo A	Um Mundo sem Fronteiras	Alex de Souza
2005	Champion	Grupo A	Um Mundo sem Fronteiras	Anderson Paz
2006	14th place	Grupo Especial	A Felicidade não tem Preço	Alex de Souza
2006	14th place	Grupo Especial	A Felicidade não tem Preço	Anderson Paz
2007	8th place	Grupo A	O Gigante Mundo dos Pequenos	Mauro Quintaes
2007	8th place	Grupo A	O Gigante Mundo dos Pequenos	Ronaldo Yllê
2008	2nd place	Grupo A	Rocinha é Minha Vida... Nordeste é Minha História!	Fábio Ricardo
2008	2nd place	Grupo A	Rocinha é Minha Vida... Nordeste é Minha História!	Anderson Paz
2009	3rd place	Grupo A	Tem francesinha no salão... O Rio no meu coração	Fábio Ricardo
2009	3rd place	Grupo A	Tem francesinha no salão... O Rio no meu coração	Anderson Paz
2010	10th place	Grupo A	Ykamiabas	Fábio Ricardo
2010	10th place	Grupo A	Ykamiabas	Silas Leleu
2011	9th place	Grupo A	Rocinha! Estou vidrado em você	Luiz Carlos Bruno
2011	9th place	Grupo A	Rocinha! Estou vidrado em você	Anderson Paz
2012	8th place	Grupo A	Vou colocar teu nome na praça	Luiz Carlos Bruno
2012	8th place	Grupo A	Vou colocar teu nome na praça	Anderson Paz
2013	5th place	Série A	Mistura de Sabores e Raças: Uma Feijoada á Brasileira	Luiz Carlos Bruno
2013	5th place	Série A	Mistura de Sabores e Raças: Uma Feijoada á Brasileira	Silas Leleu
2014	16th place	Série A	Do paraíso sonhado, um sonho realizado - sorria, a Rocinha chegou à Barra	Luiz Carlos Bruno
2014	16th place	Série A	Do paraíso sonhado, um sonho realizado - sorria, a Rocinha chegou à Barra	Silas Leleu
2015	Champion	Série B	Borboleteando nos destinos da vida! O que te desafia te transforma...	Alex Oliveira; Christine Moutinho
2015	Champion	Série B	Borboleteando nos destinos da vida! O que te desafia te transforma...	Silas Leleu
2016	13th place	Série A	Nova Roma é Brasil, Brasil é Rocinha!	Alex de Oliveira
2016	13th place	Série A	Nova Roma é Brasil, Brasil é Rocinha!	Silas Leleu
2017	6th place	Série A	No Saçarico da Marquês, tem mais um freguês: Viriato Ferreira	João Vítor Araújo
2017	6th place	Série A	No Saçarico da Marquês, tem mais um freguês: Viriato Ferreira	Silas Leleu
2018	11th place	Série A	Madeira Matriz	Marcus Ferreira
2018	11th place	Série A	Madeira Matriz	Silas Leleu
2019	11th place	Série A	Bananas para o Preconceito	Júnior Pernambucano
2019	11th place	Série A	Bananas para o Preconceito	Ciganerey
2020	14th place	Série A	A guerreira negra que dominou dois mundos	Marcus Paulo
2020	14th place	Série A	A guerreira negra que dominou dois mundos	Ciganerey
2021		Série Prata	Eu sou o samba, a voz do morro sou eu mesmo sim senhor”: carnaval e samba a mais bela expressão cultural de uma raça	Marcus Paulo
2021		Série Prata	Eu sou o samba, a voz do morro sou eu mesmo sim senhor”: carnaval e samba a mais bela expressão cultural de uma raça	Dodô Ananias
