= Caprichosos de Pilares =

Caprichosos
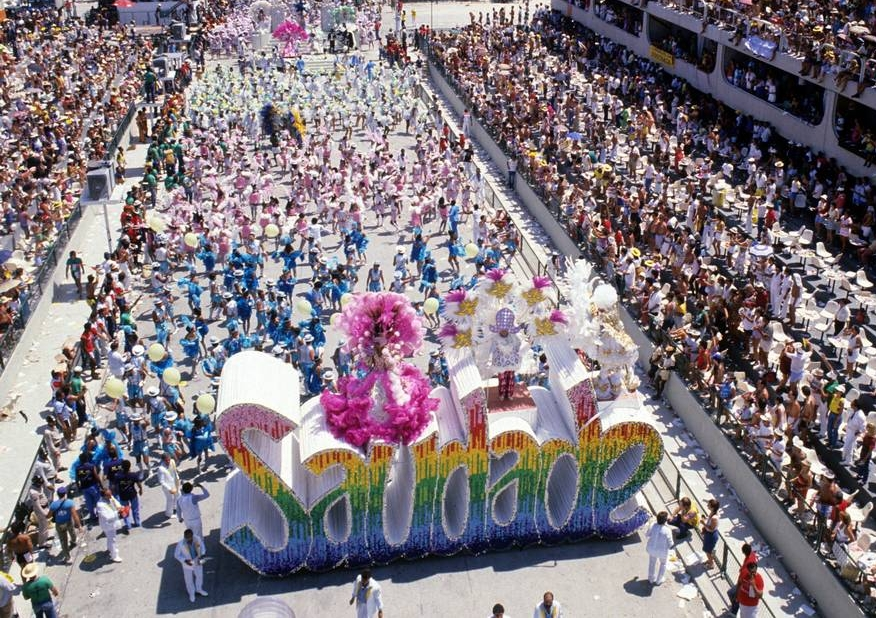
- Full name: Grêmio Recreativo Escola de Samba Caprichosos de Pilares
- Foundation: February 19, 1949; 76 years ago
- Blessing school: Portela
- Colors
- Symbol: Cobra
- Location: Pilares
- President: Carlos Fernando Leandro

The Grêmio Recreativo Escola de Samba Caprichosos de Pilares (or simply Caprichosos de Pilares) is a Brazilian samba school of Rio de Janeiro based in the neighborhood of Pilares.

It was founded on February 19, 1949, by Oscar Lino, Dagoberto Bernardo, Valter Machado, Romão da Silva, Gilberto Ribeiro, Amarildo Cristiano, João Cândido, Sebastian Benjamin, Tia Alvarinda and Athayde Pereira although many historians the point as sort of dissent from another former association in Pilares: Unidos da Terra Nova.

However this school was on the outskirts of the currently defunct Terra Nova in what now today and part of Pilares. A sambists group decided create a new entity. Its original colors were red and white, but then were changed to blue and white in honor of godmother Portela.

Its symbol is a shield containing a tambourine and a box-of-war enveloped by two blue snakes with their tails wrapped around each other, which has the initials of the association beneath them, and there are two versions for the choice. many names of samba and rhythm started at school, such Anderson Leonardo, Xande de Pilares, Sandra de Sá and battery director Paulinho Botelho.

But what made history even at school was the plots in satire, criticism and humor created by Luiz Fernando Reis where they constitute a formula that spoke Inflation have criticized politicians asked Diretas Já that please and spoke to the public. However the revisionist school, and this style, culminating in various descents, to access groups.

In 2015 the school presented the plot "in my hand is cheaper, the carnival rookie Leandro Vieira, wiring closets us and who coordinated the shed showed a bit of irreverent plotlines and did your best presentation of the Decade according to critics about the parade in seventh place.

However already without the carnival producer Amauri Santos which a parade before carnival already expected due to internal problems and financial which many members paraded with incomplete costumes and floats badly finished. culminated in relegation and consequently on Intendente Magalhães.

== Classifications ==
Year	Place	Division	Plot	Carnivals Producers
Year	Place	Division	Plot	Singers
1950	14th place	UGESB	Grito do Ypiranga	
1951	17th place	UGESB	Alavanca e Progresso	
1952	7th place	Grupo 2	Beijamin Constant	
1953	7th place	Grupo 2	Homenagem a Santos Dumont	
1954	Vice Champion	Grupo 2	Asas do Brasil	
1955	10th place	Grupo 1	Maria Quitéria	
1956	14th place	Grupo 1	Exaltação à Justiça brasileira	
1957	8th place	Grupo 1	Glória ao General Osório	
1958	15th place	Grupo 1	Glória à música brasileira	
1959	10th place	Grupo 1	Laços de fita	
1960	Champion	Grupo 2	Invasão Holandesa na Bahia	
1961	9th place	Grupo 1	Império de D. Pedro II	
1962	4th place	Grupo 2	Galeria dos Bravos	
1963	9th place	Grupo 2	A lenda da pedra verde	
1964	10th place	Grupo 2	IV Centenário do Rio de Janeiro	
1965	11th place	Grupo 2	O último baile da corte imperial	
1966	12th place	Grupo 2	A transmigração da família real	
1967	11th place	Grupo 2	O Brasil através de suas músicas	
1968	13th place	Grupo 2	Negrinho do Pastoreio	
1969	8th place	Grupo 2	A Revolução do Alfaiates da Bahia	
1970	11th place	Grupo 2	Aclamação da Princesa Isabel	
1971	Champion	Grupo 3	Brasil na primavera	
1972	11th place	Grupo 2	Brasil - a flor que desabrocha	
1973	13th place	Grupo 2	Aclamação e coroação de D. Pedro I	
1974	4th place	Grupo 3	Adeus praça XI, adeus	
1975	10th place	Grupo 2	Congada do Rei David	
1976	13th place	Grupo 2	Devaneios de um Pierrot	
1977	3rd place	Group 3	Maria Quitéria, heroína de uma raça	
1978	6th place	Grupo 2	Festa da Uva no Rio Grande do Sul	
1979	6th place	Grupo 1B	Uruçumirim, paraíso tupinambá	
1980	5th place	Grupo 1B	É a maior	Roberto D'Rodrigues
1980	5th place	Grupo 1B	É a maior	Quinzinho
1981	12th place	Grupo 1B	Amor, sublime amor	Roberto D'Rodrigues
1981	12th place	Grupo 1B	Amor, sublime amor	Manoel Passos
1982	Champion	Grupo 1B	Moça bonita não paga	Luiz Fernando Reis
1982	Champion	Grupo 1B	Moça bonita não paga	Carlinhos de Pilares
1983	Hours concours	Grupo 1A	Um cardápio à brasileira	Luiz Fernando Reis
1983	Hours concours	Grupo 1A	Um cardápio à brasileira	Carlinhos de Pilares
1984	6th place	Grupo 1A	A Visita da Nobreza do Riso a Chico Rei, num Palco nem Sempre Iluminado	Luiz Fernando Reis
1984	6th place	Grupo 1A	A Visita da Nobreza do Riso a Chico Rei, num Palco nem Sempre Iluminado	Carlinhos de Pilares
1985	5th place	Grupo 1A	E por falar em saudade	Luiz Fernando Reis
1985	5th place	Grupo 1A	E por falar em saudade	Carlinhos de Pilares
1986	9th place	Grupo 1A	Brazil, não seremos jamais, ou seremos?	Luiz Fernando Reis
1986	9th place	Grupo 1A	Brazil, não seremos jamais, ou seremos?	Carlinhos de Pilares
1987	8th place	Grupo 1	Eu prometo	Luiz Fernando Reis
1987	8th place	Grupo 1	Eu prometo	Carlinhos de Pilares
1988	8th place	Grupo 1	Luz, câmera, ação	Renato Lage; Lílian Rabello
1988	8th place	Grupo 1	Luz, câmera, ação	Carlinhos de Pilares
1989	12th place	Grupo 1	O que é bom todo mundo gosta	Renato Lage; Lílian Rabello
1989	12th place	Grupo 1	O que é bom todo mundo gosta	J.Leão
1990	13th place	Grupo Especial	Com a boca no mundo	Alexandre Louzada
1990	13th place	Grupo Especial	Com a boca no mundo	Aroldo Melodia
1991	10th place	Grupo Especial	Terceiro Milênio - Em busca do juízo afinal	Alexandre Louzada
1991	10th place	Grupo Especial	Terceiro Milênio - Em busca do juízo afinal	Carlinhos de Pilares
1992	11th place	Grupo Especial	Brasil feito a mão... do barro ao carnaval	Alexandre Louzada; Washington Luiz
1992	11th place	Grupo Especial	Brasil feito a mão... do barro ao carnaval	Carlinhos de Pilares
1993	13th place	Grupo Especial	Não existe pecado do lado de cá do Túnel Rebouças	Luiz Fernando Reis
1993	13th place	Grupo Especial	Não existe pecado do lado de cá do Túnel Rebouças	Márcio Souto
1994	10th place	Grupo Especial	Estou amando loucamente uma coroa de quase 90 anos	Luiz Fernando Reis
1994	10th place	Grupo Especial	Estou amando loucamente uma coroa de quase 90 anos	Luizito
1995	10th place	Grupo Especial	Da terra brotei, negro sou e ouro virei	Mauro Quintaes
1995	10th place	Grupo Especial	Da terra brotei, negro sou e ouro virei	Luizito
1996	15th place	Grupo Especial	Samba, sabor chocolate	Alexandre Louzada
1996	15th place	Grupo Especial	Samba, sabor chocolate	Luizito
1997	Vice Champion	Grupo A	Do tambor ao computador	Amarildo de Mello
1997	Vice Champion	Grupo A	Do tambor ao computador	Jackson Martins
1998	10th place	Grupo Especial	Negra Origem - Negro Pelé, negra Bené	Jerônimo Guimarães
1998	10th place	Grupo Especial	Negra Origem - Negro Pelé, negra Bené	Jackson Martins
1999	9th place	Grupo Especial	No universo da beleza, mestre Pitanguy	Etevaldo Brandão
1999	9th place	Grupo Especial	No universo da beleza, mestre Pitanguy	Jackson Martins
2000	11th place	Grupo Especial	Brasil, teu espírito é santo	Etevaldo Brandão
2000	11th place	Grupo Especial	Brasil, teu espírito é santo	Jackson Martins
2001	12th place	Grupo Especial	Goiás, um sonho de amor no coração do Brasil	Jaime Cezário
2001	12th place	Grupo Especial	Goiás, um sonho de amor no coração do Brasil	Jackson Martins
2002	12th place	Grupo Especial	Deu pra ti! Tô em alto astral! Tô com Porto Alegre, trilegal	Jaime Cezário
2002	12th place	Grupo Especial	Deu pra ti! Tô em alto astral! Tô com Porto Alegre, trilegal	Jackson Martins
2003	10th place	Grupo Especial	Zumbi, Rei de Palmares e herói do Brasil. A história que não foi contada	Jaime Cezário
2003	10th place	Grupo Especial	Zumbi, Rei de Palmares e herói do Brasil. A história que não foi contada	Jackson Martins
2004	13th place	Grupo Especial	Xuxa e Seu Reino Encantado no Carnaval da Imaginação	Cahê Rodrigues
2004	13th place	Grupo Especial	Xuxa e Seu Reino Encantado no Carnaval da Imaginação	Jackson Martins
2005	11th place	Grupo Especial	Carnaval, Doce Ilusão - A Gente Se Vê Aqui, no Meio da Multidão! 20 Anos de Liga	Chico Spinoza
2005	11th place	Grupo Especial	Carnaval, Doce Ilusão - A Gente Se Vê Aqui, no Meio da Multidão! 20 Anos de Liga	Serginho do Porto
2006	13th place	Grupo Especial	Na Folia Com o Espírito Santo: o Espírito Santo Caprichou	Chico Spinoza
2006	13th place	Grupo Especial	Na Folia Com o Espírito Santo: o Espírito Santo Caprichou	Clóvis Pê
2007	2nd place	Grupo A	Com Todo o Gás, a Caprichosos Acende a Chama do Carnaval	Marcos Januário
2007	2nd place	Grupo A	Com Todo o Gás, a Caprichosos Acende a Chama do Carnaval	Clóvis Pê
2008	6th place	Grupo A	De Santo Antônio de Sá ao Polo Petroquímico, Itaboraí...uma terra abençoada!	Lane Santana
2008	6th place	Grupo A	De Santo Antônio de Sá ao Polo Petroquímico, Itaboraí...uma terra abençoada!	Zé Paulo Sierra
2009	10th place	Grupo A	No transporte da alegria...Me leva Caprichosos a caminho da folia	Lane Santana; Sandro Gomes
2009	10th place	Grupo A	No transporte da alegria...Me leva Caprichosos a caminho da folia	Zé Paulo Sierra
2010	7th place	Grupo A	E por falar em saudade	Hélcio Paim; Raphael Torres; Alexandre Rangel; Eduardo Minucci; Luiz Fernando Reis
2010	7th place	Grupo A	E por falar em saudade	Thiago Brito
2011	10th place	Grupo A	Gente humilde	Amauri Santos
2011	10th place	Grupo A	Gente humilde	Thiago Brito
2012	Champion	Grupo B	A Caprichosos faz o seu papel... levanta, sacode a poeira e dá a volta por cima!	Amauri Santos
2012	Champion	Grupo B	A Caprichosos faz o seu papel... levanta, sacode a poeira e dá a volta por cima!	Clóvis Pê
2013	6th place	Série A	Fanatismo: Enigma da Mente Humana	Amauri Santos
2013	6th place	Série A	Fanatismo: Enigma da Mente Humana	Celino Dias; Lico Monteiro; Sandro Motta
2014	9th place	Série A	Dos malandros e das madames: Lapa, an estrela da noite carioca	Amauri Santos
2014	9th place	Série A	Dos malandros e das madames: Lapa, an estrela da noite carioca	Thiago Brito
2015	7th place	Série A	Na Minha mão é Mais Barato	Leandro Vieira
2015	7th place	Série A	Na Minha mão é Mais Barato	Thiago Brito
2016	14th place	Série A	Tem gringo no samba	Amauri Santos
2016	14th place	Série A	Tem gringo no samba	Thiago Brito
2017	11th place	Série B	Vamos quebrar tudo, só de sacanagem!	Luiz Fernando Reis
2017	11th place	Série B	Vamos quebrar tudo, só de sacanagem!	Anderson Bala
2018	Not paraded	Série C	Oxum caprichosa senhora Deusa das aguas doces. Que encanta traz a o amor e a prosperidade, lavando a alma do povo de Pilares	Hélcio Paim
2018	Not paraded	Série C	Oxum caprichosa senhora Deusa das aguas doces. Que encanta traz a o amor e a prosperidade, lavando a alma do povo de Pilares	Lico Monteiro
2020	Champion	Accesso da Intendente	Uruçumirim, paraíso tupinambá	Bruno de Oliveira
2020	Champion	Accesso da Intendente	Uruçumirim, paraíso tupinambá	Hugo Júnior
2021		Série Prata	Circo Brazuca	Bruno de Oliveira
2021		Série Prata	Circo Brazuca	Hugo Júnior
