= São Clemente (school) =

- Foundation: 25 October 1961; 65 years ago
- Blessing school: Beija-Flor; Vila Isabel

The Grêmio Recreativo Escola de Samba São Clemente is a samba school from Rio de Janeiro, located in the Cidade Nova neighborhood, on Avenida Presidente Vargas.

The school became famous over the years for plots regarded as full of good humor, and sarcastic criticism of the most diverse themes. São Clemente also has sand beach soccer teams in various categories, commonly considered to be one of the few great teams of this sport that does not belong to the Copacabana-Leblon axis.

The constant oscillation between the main groups of carnival brought it the nickname of "yo-yo" school. Due to history lines panfletics of the 1980 the school also became known as the "PT of samba". In the current decade, however, the school has been trying to print a new style to make carnival.

With the fire of Cidade do Samba, the school succeeded to stay in the Special Group, doing some good fashion and betting on the old with the new, with Fábio Ricardo and with Rosa Magalhães.

== Classifications ==
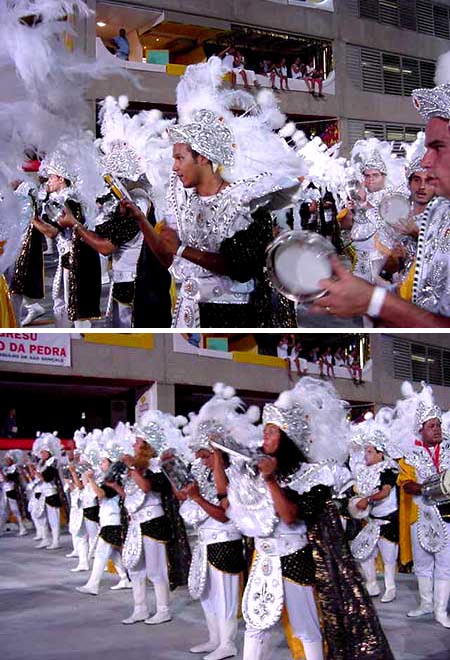
The "Foel Bateria" of São Clemente in the parade 2003, year in which the school was a champion of the Access Group (current Serie A)

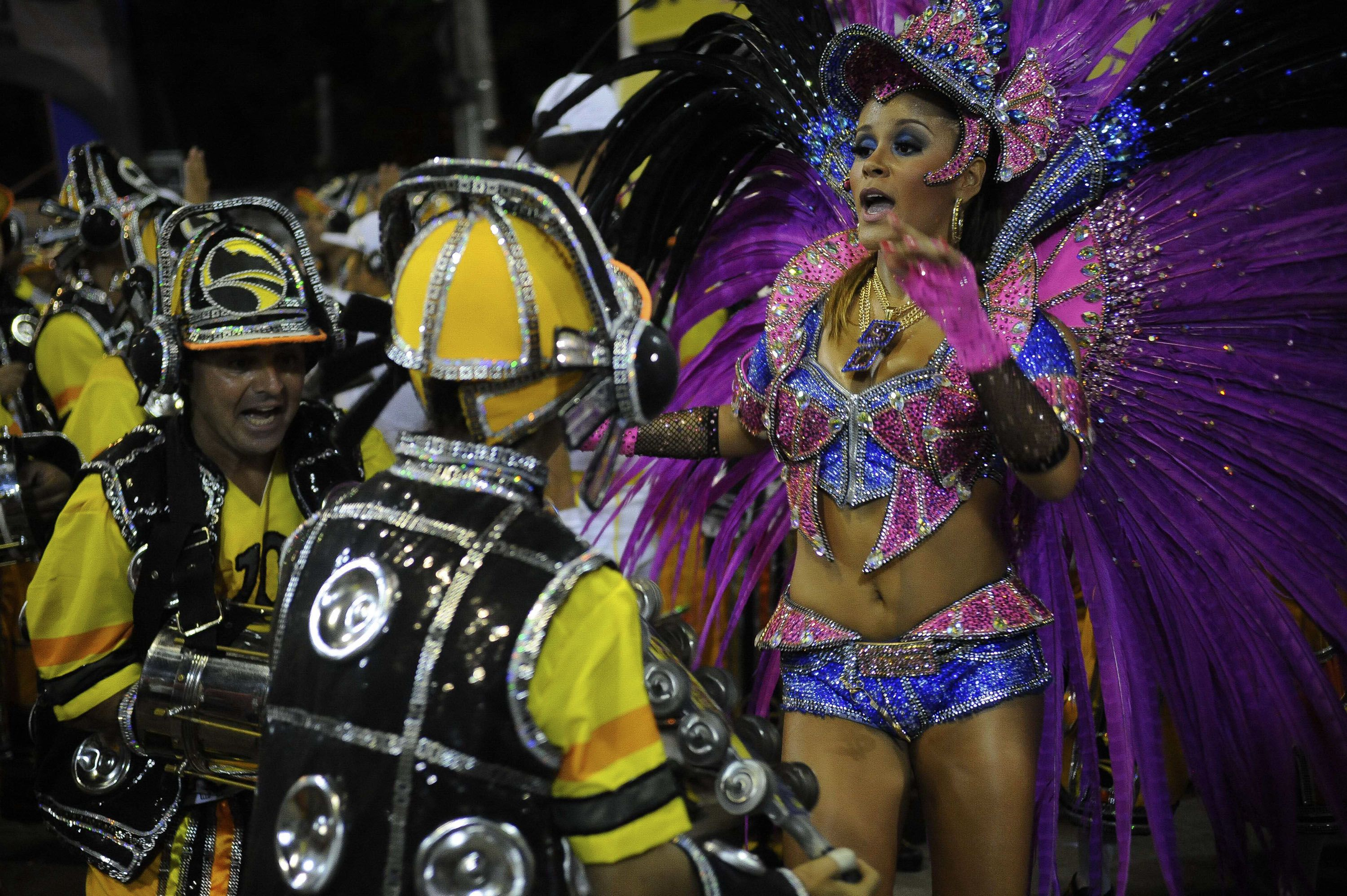
Raphaela Gomes, daughter of Renato Almeida Gomes, in her debut as queen of battery, the parade of 2014

Year	Place	Division	Plot	Carnivals Producers
Year	Place	Division	Plot	Singers
1962	4th place	Grupo 3	Riquezas do Brasil	Gabriel do Nascimento; Dário Trindade
1963	3rd place	Grupo 3	Rio de Antanho	Augusto Henrique
1964	Champion	Grupo 3	Rio dos vice-reis	Ivo da Rocha Gomes
1965	3rd place	Grupo 2	Relíquias e memórias do Rio	Ivo da Rocha Gomes
1966	Champion	Grupo 2	Apoteose ao folclore brasileiro	Ivo da Rocha Gomes
1967	10th place	Grupo 1	Festas e tradições populares do Brasil	Renato Miguez; Dedé
1968	7th place	Grupo 2	Apoteose à cultura nacional	Ivo da Rocha Gomes
1969	Not competed	Grupo 2	Assim dança o Brasil	Ivo da Rocha Gomes
1970	9th place	Grupo 2	Histórias fantásticas	Ivo da Rocha Gomes
1971	5th place	Grupo 2	O beijo de 3 saudades	Ivo da Rocha Gomes
1972	5th place	Grupo 2	Danças de um povo livre	Ivo da Rocha Gomes
1973	7th place	Grupo 2	Momentos inesquecíveis de Tapoagipe	Ivo da Rocha Gomes
1974	11th place	Grupo 2	Sonhos fascinantes de um jovem adolescente	Ivo da Rocha Gomes
1975	5th place	Grupo 2	Quem quebrou meu violão - Taí, Taí, Tra-Lá-Lá	Ivo da Rocha Gomes; Carlos Gil
1975	5th place	Grupo 2	Quem quebrou meu violão - Taí, Taí, Tra-Lá-Lá	Cardoso
1976	10th place	Grupo 2	Recife, nosso amor distante	Ivo da Rocha Gomes
1976	10th place	Grupo 2	Recife, nosso amor distante	Cardoso
1977	10th place	Grupo 2	Acredite se quiser	Ivo da Rocha Gomes
1977	10th place	Grupo 2	Acredite se quiser	Cardoso
1978	9th place	Grupo 2	Apoteose ao teatro de revista	Ivo da Rocha Gomes
1978	9th place	Grupo 2	Apoteose ao teatro de revista	Cardoso
1979	5th place	Grupo 2A	Louvação às 3 rainhas	Ivo da Rocha Gomes; Ricardo Ayres
1979	5th place	Grupo 2A	Louvação às 3 rainhas	Izaías de Paula
1980	9th place	Grupo 1B	A doce ilusão do sambista	Ivo da Rocha Gomes
1980	9th place	Grupo 1B	A doce ilusão do sambista	João Carlos Grilo
1981	3rd place	Grupo 2A	Assim dança o Brasil	Ivo da Rocha Gomes
1981	3rd place	Grupo 2A	Assim dança o Brasil	João Carlos Grilo
1982	2nd place	Grupo 2A	As intocáveis tempestades de Dam	Carlinhos D'Andrade
1982	2nd place	Grupo 2A	As intocáveis tempestades de Dam	João Carlos Grilo
1983	3rd place	Grupo 2A	Criação da noite	Carlinhos D'Andrade
1983	3rd place	Grupo 2A	Criação da noite	João Carlos Grilo
1984	4th place	Grupo 1B	Não corra, não mate, não morra - O diabo está solto no asfalto	Carlinhos D'Andrade; Paulo Vasconcellos
1984	4th place	Grupo 1B	Não corra, não mate, não morra - O diabo está solto no asfalto	Geraldão
1985	15th place	Grupo 1A	Quem casa quer casa	Carlinhos D'Andrade; Roberto Costa
1985	15th place	Grupo 1A	Quem casa quer casa	Izaías de Paula
1986	Vice Champion	Grupo 1B	Muita saúva, pouca saúde, os males do Brasil são	Carlinhos D'Andrade; Roberto Costa
1986	Vice Champion	Grupo 1B	Muita saúva, pouca saúde, os males do Brasil são	Geraldão
1987	10th place	Grupo 1	Capitães do asfalto	Carlinhos D'Andrade; Roberto Costa
1987	10th place	Grupo 1	Capitães do asfalto	Izaías de Paula
1988	10th place	Grupo 1	Quem avisa amigo é	Carlinhos D'Andrade; Roberto Costa
1988	10th place	Grupo 1	Quem avisa amigo é	Izaías de Paula
1989	13th place	Grupo 1	Made in Brazil, yes nós temos banana	Carlinhos D'Andrade
1989	13th place	Grupo 1	Made in Brazil, yes nós temos banana	Geraldão
1990	6th place	Grupo Especial	E o samba sambou	Carlinhos D'Andrade; Roberto Costa; César Azevedo
1990	6th place	Grupo Especial	E o samba sambou	Izaías de Paula
1991	13th place	Grupo Especial	Já vi este filme	Carlinhos D'Andrade; Roberto Costa; César Azevedo
1991	13th place	Grupo Especial	Já vi este filme	Sidnei Moreno
1992	7th place	Grupo A	E o salário ó!	Luiz Fernando Reis; José Félix
1992	7th place	Grupo A	E o salário ó!	Sidnei Moreno
1993	7th place	Grupo A	O Pão Nosso de Cada Dia	José Félix; Roberto Costa
1993	7th place	Grupo A	O Pão Nosso de Cada Dia	Quinho
1994	Vice Champion	Grupo A	Uma andorinha só não faz verão	Roberto Costa
1994	Vice Champion	Grupo A	Uma andorinha só não faz verão	Vaguinho
1995	17th place	Grupo Especial	O que é, o que é... que não é, mas será?	Luiz Fernando Reis
1995	17th place	Grupo Especial	O que é, o que é... que não é, mas será?	Vaguinho
1996	3rd place	Grupo A	Se a canoa não virar a São Clemente chega lá	Roberto Costa; Jaime Cezário
1996	3rd place	Grupo A	Se a canoa não virar a São Clemente chega lá	Márcio Souto
1997	3rd place	Grupo A	A São Clemente Botafogo na Sapucaí	Jaime Cezário
1997	3rd place	Grupo A	A São Clemente Botafogo na Sapucaí	Márcio Souto
1998	Vice Champion	Grupo A	Maiores são os poderes do povo - Se liga na São Clemente!	Jaime Cezário
1998	Vice Champion	Grupo A	Maiores são os poderes do povo - Se liga na São Clemente!	David do Pandeiro
1999	14th place	Grupo Especial	A São Clemente comemora e traz Rui Barbosa para os braços do povo	Jaime Cezário
1999	14th place	Grupo Especial	A São Clemente comemora e traz Rui Barbosa para os braços do povo	Serginho do Porto
2000	4th place	Grupo A	No ano 2000, a São Clemente é Tupi com Sergipe na Sapucaí	João Luiz de Moura; Sônia Regina
2000	4th place	Grupo A	No ano 2000, a São Clemente é Tupi com Sergipe na Sapucaí	Rixxah
2001	Vice Champion	Grupo A	A São Clemente falou e nada mudou nesse Brasil gigante	Sônia Regina
2001	Vice Champion	Grupo A	A São Clemente falou e nada mudou nesse Brasil gigante	Anderson Paz
2002	14th place	Grupo Especial	Guapimirim, paraíso ecológico abençoado pelo Dedo de Deus	Lane Santana; Sônia Regina; Alberto Rashyd; Nonato Trinta
2002	14th place	Grupo Especial	Guapimirim, paraíso ecológico abençoado pelo Dedo de Deus	Anderson Paz
2003	Champion	Grupo A	Mangaratiba - Uma história de luta para todos que amam a terra e a liberdade	Lane Santana
2003	Champion	Grupo A	Mangaratiba - Uma história de luta para todos que amam a terra e a liberdade	Anderson Paz
2004	14th place	Grupo Especial	Boi Voador Sobre o Recife: O Cordel da Galhofa Nacional	Milton Cunha
2004	14th place	Grupo Especial	Boi Voador Sobre o Recife: O Cordel da Galhofa Nacional	Anderson Paz
2005	3rd place	Grupo A	Velho é a Vovozinha: A São Clemente Enrugadinha e Gostosinha	Milton Cunha
2005	3rd place	Grupo A	Velho é a Vovozinha: A São Clemente Enrugadinha e Gostosinha	Clóvis Pê
2006	2nd place	Grupo A	De Gonzagão a Gonzaguinha: Em Vida de Viajante	Renato Lyra; Tatiana Santos; Fábio Santos; Bráulio Malheiro; Rodrigo Sampaio
2006	2nd place	Grupo A	De Gonzagão a Gonzaguinha: Em Vida de Viajante	Leonardo Bessa
2007	Champion	Grupo A	Barrados no baile	Fábio Santos; Edward Moraes
2007	Champion	Grupo A	Barrados no baile	Leonardo Bessa
2008	12th place	Grupo Especial	O Clemente João VI no Rio: A Redescoberta do Brasil	Milton Cunha; Mauro Quintaes; Fábio Santos
2008	12th place	Grupo Especial	O Clemente João VI no Rio: A Redescoberta do Brasil	Leonardo Bessa
2009	4th place	Grupo A	O Beijo Moleque da São Clemente	Mauro Quintaes; Alexandre Louzada
2009	4th place	Grupo A	O Beijo Moleque da São Clemente	Leonardo Bessa
2010	Champion	Grupo A	Choque de Ordem na folia	Mauro Quintaes
2010	Champion	Grupo A	Choque de Ordem na folia	Igor Sorriso
2011	9th place	Grupo Especial	O seu, o meu, o nosso Rio, abençoado por Deus e bonito por natureza	Fábio Ricardo
2011	9th place	Grupo Especial	O seu, o meu, o nosso Rio, abençoado por Deus e bonito por natureza	Igor Sorriso
2012	11th place	Grupo Especial	Uma Aventura Musical na Sapucaí!	Fábio Ricardo
2012	11th place	Grupo Especial	Uma Aventura Musical na Sapucaí!	Igor Sorriso
2013	10th place	Grupo Especial	Horário nobre	Fábio Ricardo
2013	10th place	Grupo Especial	Horário nobre	Igor Sorriso
2014	11th place	Grupo Especial	Favela	Max Lopes; Tiago Martins; João Vítor; Bruno César
2014	11th place	Grupo Especial	Favela	Igor Sorriso
2015	8th place	Grupo Especial	A incrível história do homem que só tinha medo da Matinta Pereira, da Tocandira e da Onça Pé de Boi	Rosa Magalhães
2015	8th place	Grupo Especial	A incrível história do homem que só tinha medo da Matinta Pereira, da Tocandira e da Onça Pé de Boi	Igor Sorriso
2016	9th place	Grupo Especial	Mais de Mil Palhaços no Salão	Rosa Magalhães
2016	9th place	Grupo Especial	Mais de Mil Palhaços no Salão	Leozinho Nunes
2017	9th place	Grupo Especial	Onisuáquimalipanse	Rosa Magalhães
2017	9th place	Grupo Especial	Onisuáquimalipanse	Leozinho Nunes
2018	11th place	Grupo Especial	Academicamente Popular	Jorge Silveira
2018	11th place	Grupo Especial	Academicamente Popular	Leozinho Nunes
2019	12th place	Grupo Especial	E o samba sambou	Jorge Silveira
2019	12th place	Grupo Especial	E o samba sambou	Leozinho Nunes; Bruno Ribas; Larissa Luz
2020	10th place	Grupo Especial	O Conto do Vigário	Jorge Silveira
2020	10th place	Grupo Especial	O Conto do Vigário	Leozinho Nunes; Bruno Ribas; Grazzi Brasil
2022	12th place	Grupo Especial	Minha vida é uma peça	Thiago Martins
2022	12th place	Grupo Especial	Minha vida é uma peça	Leozinho Nunes; Maninho
2023		Série Ouro		Jorge Silveira
2023		Série Ouro		Leozinho Nunes; Maninho
