= Unidos de Padre Miguel =

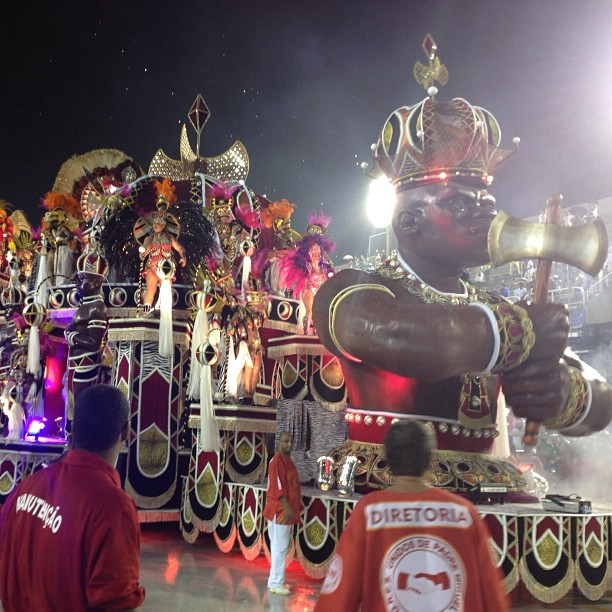
- Foundation: 12 November 1957; 68 years ago
- Blessing school: Viradouro
- President: Lenílson Leal
Carnival staff
- Carnival producer: Fábio Ricardo
- Carnival singer: Diego Nicolau
- Carnival director: Cícero Costa and Nana Costa
- Director of Battery: Mestre Dinho
- Queen of Battery: Karina Costa
- Mestre-sala and Porta-Bandeira: Vinícius Antunes and Jéssica Ferreira
- Choreography: David Lima

The Grêmio Recreativo Escola de Samba Unidos de Padre Miguel is a samba school of the city of Rio de Janeiro, being located on Rua Mesquita in the neighborhood of Padre Miguel. I came to present themselves among the great, in 1960, 1971 and 1972. After years in which they would wrap the flag gave back on top and Group A, in 2010. but with the addition made by LIERJ, where it originated the series to the school came to be a candidate for the title of this group.

== Classifications ==
Year	Place	Division	Plot	Carnivals Producers
Year	Place	Division	Plot	Singers
1959	Champion	Grupo 2	Lampião	
1960	9th place	Grupo 1	Ato da aclamação	
1961	10th place	Grupo 1	Homenagem aos ex-combatantes	
1962	10th place	Grupo 2	Cinco fatos históricos	
1963	Vice-Champion	Group 2	Costumes e tradição do Rio Grande do Sul	
1964	9th place	Grupo 1	Feira na Bahia	
1965	12th place	Grupo 2	Viagem através do Rio	
1966	7th place	Grupo 2	Conquista de Araci	
1967	4th place	Grupo 2	O penacho do capitão-mor	
1968	8th place	Grupo 2	Salões e damas do 2° Império	
1969	7th place	Grupo 2	Três lendas de amor	
1970	Vice-Champion	Grupo 2	Homenagem ao poema “Primaveras” de Casimiro de Abreu	César de Azevedo
1970	Vice-Champion	Grupo 2	Homenagem ao poema “Primaveras” de Casimiro de Abreu	Rutinha
1971	10th place	Grupo 1	Samba do crioulo doido	César de Azevedo
1971	10th place	Grupo 1	Samba do crioulo doido	Rutinha
1972	12th place	Grupo 1	Madureira, seu samba, sua história	César de Azevedo
1972	12th place	Grupo 1	Madureira, seu samba, sua história	Rutinha
1973	16th place	Grupo 2	Cazuza	César de Azevedo
1973	16th place	Grupo 2	Cazuza	Rutinha
1974	Champion	Grupo 3	Lampião, cangaço e nordeste	César de Azevedo
1974	Champion	Grupo 3	Lampião, cangaço e nordeste	Rutinha
1975	17th place	Grupo 2	Resplendor de um grande festival	César de Azevedo
1975	17th place	Grupo 2	Resplendor de um grande festival	Rutinha
1976	18th place	Grupo 2	Ajuricaba, um herói amazonense	César de Azevedo
1976	18th place	Grupo 2	Ajuricaba, um herói amazonense	Rutinha
1977	7th place	Grupo 2	Ginga a rainha da gongada	César de Azevedo
1977	7th place	Grupo 2	Ginga a rainha da gongada	Rutinha
1978	5th place	Grupo 3	Festa de Yemanjá	Guilherme Martins; Antônio Andrade; Djalma Santos
1978	5th place	Grupo 3	Festa de Yemanjá	Rutinha
1979	9th place	Grupo 2B	Orlando Silva	Guilherme Martins; Antônio Andrade; Djalma Santos
1979	9th place	Grupo 2B	Orlando Silva	Rutinha
1980	6th place	Grupo 2B	As Riquezas de Minas Gerais	Guilherme Martins; Antônio Andrade; Djalma Santos
1980	6th place	Grupo 2B	As Riquezas de Minas Gerais	Rutinha
1981	3rd place	Grupo 2B	Aí Vem Dezembro	Guilherme Martins; Antônio Andrade; Djalma Santos
1981	3rd place	Grupo 2B	Aí Vem Dezembro	Rutinha
1982	7th place	Grupo 2B	Ari Barroso, o Gênio Imortal	Carlos Henrique
1982	7th place	Grupo 2B	Ari Barroso, o Gênio Imortal	Rutinha
1983	Vice-Champion	Grupo 2B	Festa da Mãe-d'Água	José Eugênio
1983	Vice-Champion	Grupo 2B	Festa da Mãe-d'Água	Rutinha
1984	Champion	Grupo 2A	O Quilombo dos Palmares	Arlindo Rodrigues
1984	Champion	Grupo 2A	O Quilombo dos Palmares	Rutinha
1985	10th place	Grupo 1B	Folia, Amor e Fantasia	Valdir Madureira
1985	10th place	Grupo 1B	Folia, Amor e Fantasia	Rutinha
1986	8th place	Grupo 1B	E Aí o Homem Entrou na Guerra com a Natureza	Valdir Madureira
1986	8th place	Grupo 1B	E Aí o Homem Entrou na Guerra com a Natureza	Rutinha
1987	10th place	Grupo 3	Meu Irmão de Cor, Meu Irmão de Fé	Valdir Madureira
1987	10th place	Grupo 3	Meu Irmão de Cor, Meu Irmão de Fé	Rutinha
1988	11th place	Grupo 3	Valongo	Valdir Madureira
1988	11th place	Grupo 3	Valongo	Rutinha
1989	10th place	Grupo D	O Grito e o eco	Valdir Madureira
1989	10th place	Grupo D	O Grito e o eco	Rutinha
1991	5th place	Grupo D	Vamos dizer não a destruição	Valdir Madureira
1991	5th place	Grupo D	Vamos dizer não a destruição	Rutinha
1992	6th place	Grupo D	Brasil Folclórico	Valdir Madureira
1992	6th place	Grupo D	Brasil Folclórico	Rutinha
1993	7th place	Grupo D	Tirei da mente o que não tinha no bolso	Socrates; Didi
1993	7th place	Grupo D	Tirei da mente o que não tinha no bolso	Rutinha
1994	7th place	Grupo D	Parabéns para quem? Vamos comemorar o quê?	Socrates; Didi
1994	7th place	Grupo D	Parabéns para quem? Vamos comemorar o quê?	Rutinha
1995	Vice Champion	Grupo D	Tahira-can, o homem estrela	Ronaldo
1995	Vice Champion	Grupo D	Tahira-can, o homem estrela	Rutinha
1996	11th place	Grupo C	Uma festa caipira no mês de fevereiro	Ronaldo
1996	11th place	Grupo C	Uma festa caipira no mês de fevereiro	Rutinha
1997	8th place	Grupo C	Frutos do mar	Ronaldo
1997	8th place	Grupo C	Frutos do mar	Rutinha
1998	7th place	Grupo C	Pelo seu vôo quero me guiar para a Amazônia	Ronaldo
1998	7th place	Grupo C	Pelo seu vôo quero me guiar para a Amazônia	Rutinha
1999	4th place	Grupo C	Paixão Carioca	Fernando Muniz
1999	4th place	Grupo C	Paixão Carioca	João da Baiana
2000	5th place	Grupo C	Bahia de todos os negros	Cidinho
2000	5th place	Grupo C	Bahia de todos os negros	João da Baiana
2001	12th place	Grupo C	Trinca de ouro - Mocidade e seus tesouros	By Lucas
2001	12th place	Grupo C	Trinca de ouro - Mocidade e seus tesouros	João da Baiana
2002	12th place	Grupo D	Brasil de Ouro, Cinco Séculos de Tesouro	Jaime da Silva
2002	12th place	Grupo D	Brasil de Ouro, Cinco Séculos de Tesouro	João da Baiana
2003	6th place	Grupo E	Unidos pela preservação, somos mensageiros da floresta	Chiquinho Murta
2003	6th place	Grupo E	Unidos pela preservação, somos mensageiros da floresta	João da Baiana
2004	Vice-Champion	Grupo E	Bangu, glórias em séculos de histórias	Márcio Marins
2004	Vice-Champion	Grupo E	Bangu, glórias em séculos de histórias	João da Baiana
2005	Champion	Grupo D	Abram alas que eu quero passar. Sou carnaval carioca sou Unidos de Padre Miguel	André Cézari
2005	Champion	Grupo D	Abram alas que eu quero passar. Sou carnaval carioca sou Unidos de Padre Miguel	João da Baiana
2006	Champion	Grupo C	Da lágrimas do tupã, nasce o fruto divino: o guaraná	Edson Pereira
2006	Champion	Grupo C	Da lágrimas do tupã, nasce o fruto divino: o guaraná	Edson Carvalho
2007	6th place	Grupo B	Unidos pelos caminhos da fé, desbravando os carnavais	Edson Pereira
2007	6th place	Grupo B	Unidos pelos caminhos da fé, desbravando os carnavais	Edson Carvalho
2008	3rd place	Grupo B	No reino das águas de Olucôn	Edson Pereira
2008	3rd place	Grupo B	No reino das águas de Olucôn	Edson Carvalho
2009	Champion	Grupo RJ1	Vinho, néctar dos deuses - A celebração da vida	Edward Moraes; Guilherme Alexandre
2009	Champion	Grupo RJ1	Vinho, néctar dos deuses - A celebração da vida	Edson Carvalho
2010	11th place	Grupo A	Aço: Universo presente na riqueza da terra - o futuro a ti pertence	Edward Moraes; Guilherme Alexandre
2010	11th place	Grupo A	Aço: Universo presente na riqueza da terra - o futuro a ti pertence	Edson Carvalho
2011	3rd place	Grupo B	Hilária Batista de Almeida	Fábio Santos
2011	3rd place	Grupo B	Hilária Batista de Almeida	Hugo Júnior
2012	3rd place	Grupo B	Arte - Um universo fascinante	Reyla Ravache; Wallacy Vinicyos; Wilsinho Mendes
2012	3rd place	Grupo B	Arte - Um universo fascinante	Igor Vianna
2013	7th place	Série A	O Reencontro entre o céu e a terra no Reino de Alá Àfin Oyó	Edson Pereira
2013	7th place	Série A	O Reencontro entre o céu e a terra no Reino de Alá Àfin Oyó	Marquinho Art'Samba
2014	3rd place	Série A	Decifra-me ou te devoro: Enigmas - chaves da vida	Edson Pereira
2014	3rd place	Série A	Decifra-me ou te devoro: Enigmas - chaves da vida	Marquinho Art'Samba
2015	2nd place	Série A	O cavaleiro armorial mandacariza o Carnaval	Edson Pereira
2015	2nd place	Série A	O cavaleiro armorial mandacariza o Carnaval	Marquinho Art'Samba
2016	2nd place	Série A	O quinto dos infernos	Edson Pereira
2016	2nd place	Série A	O quinto dos infernos	Luizinho Andanças
2017	4th place	Série A	Ossain - O poder da cura	Edson Pereira
2017	4th place	Série A	Ossain - O poder da cura	Pixulé
2018	2nd place	Série A	O Eldorado Submerso: Delírio Tupi-Parintintin	João Vítor Araújo
2018	2nd place	Série A	O Eldorado Submerso: Delírio Tupi-Parintintin	Pixulé
2019	6th place	Série A	Qualquer semelhança não terá sido mera coincidência	João Vítor Araújo
2019	6th place	Série A	Qualquer semelhança não terá sido mera coincidência	Pixulé
2020	2nd place	Série A	Quem somos nós? Tarsila	Fábio Ricardo
2020	2nd place	Série A	Quem somos nós? Tarsila	Diego Nicolau
2022	5th place	Série Ouro	Iroko - É tempo de Xirê	Edson Pereira
2022	5th place	Série Ouro	Iroko - É tempo de Xirê	Diego Nicolau
