= Paraíso do Tuiuti =

Samba school

Tuiuti
- Full name: Grêmio Recreativo Escola de Samba Paraíso do Tuiuti
- Foundation: April 5, 1952; 73 years ago
- Blessing school: Mangueira

The Grêmio Recreativo Escola de Samba Paraíso do Tuiuti is a samba school in Rio de Janeiro, located in the neighborhood of São Cristóvão.

In performance of Paraíso do Tuiuti, from the beginning, was discreet, but in 1968, with the plot of Julius Matos honoring the neighborhood of São Cristóvão, takes the first place in Group 3 and goes to the Group 2. In the following year gets the third place in Group 2, with a point behind of the Jacarezinho, vice champion. In fact, until the early 1980s almost nobody heard from school, but from then on, the school lived a moment of great euphoria, thanks to the efforts of the carnival Maria Augusta Rodrigues, who gave the title of the group for the school that had no patron, a phenomenon that is typical of large schools, which confer fame and prestige to their approaches

The Paradise of the Tuiuti could not rely only on the small grant journal to cope with the high expenses that the Carnival, with the characteristics that took in our days, requires. At the end of the decade of the 1990s, the school has not ceased to grow and become stronger, until, invited to participate in the Group A in 2000, presented the story about Dom Pedro II and was vice-champion, the tie with the school just in time, acquiring the right to parade in 2001 in the Special Group.

In the Special Group, the school told the story of a school that came out of Spain, toward Mecca and ended in Brazil, fighting in the Quilombo dos Palmares. Considered as a zebra of the Access Group A in 2000, the school adopted it as a pet, and brought them in Africa. The school had many problems with their floats. After 16 years he returned the elite of the samba. Where only due to maneuver of allegories of the own school and the tragedy of the Tijuca.

== Classifications ==
| Year | Place | Division | Plot | Carnivals Producers |
| Year | Place | Division | Plot | Singers |
|---|---|---|---|---|
| 1955 | 11th place | Grupo 1 | Apoteose a Edgar Roquete Pinto | |
| 1956 | 12th place | Grupo 1 | O circo, a grande parada | |
| 1957 | 17th place | Grupo 1 | Meus sonhos de criança | |
| 1958 | 3rd place | Grupo 2 | Homenagem As forças armadas | |
| 1959 | 15th place | Grupo 1 | Batalha do Tuiuti | Júlio Mattos |
| 1960 | 11th place | Grupo 2 | Do Terço Velho ao Sampaio da FEB | Júlio Mattos |
| 1961 | 14th place | Grupo 2 | Exaltação a Pedro Américo, Castro Alves e Rui Barbosa | Júlio Mattos |
| 1963 | 18th place | Grupo 3 | Glória a Villa-Lobos | Júlio Mattos |
| 1964 | 3rd place | Grupo 3 | Uma formatura nas Agulhas Negras | Júlio Mattos |
| 1965 | 8th place | Grupo 2 | Rio, 4 séculos de glória | Júlio Mattos |
| 1966 | 15th place | Grupo 2 | Sonho de uma noite de carnaval | Júlio Mattos |
| 1968 | Champion | Grupo 3 | São Cristóvão, bairro imperial | Júlio Mattos |
| 1969 | 3rd place | Grupo 2 | O mundo da poesia de Olavo Bilac | Júlio Mattos |
| 1970 | 7th place | Grupo 2 | Alencar, Patriarca da Literatura Brasileira | Júlio Mattos |
| 1971 | 6th place | Grupo 2 | Rio, carnaval e batucada | |
| 1972 | 3rd place | Grupo 2 | Sempre Brasil | |
| 1973 | 5th place | Grupo 2 | Os imortais da música brasileira | |
| 1974 | 12th place | Grupo 2 | Olimpíadas festa de um povo | |
| 1975 | 7th place | Grupo 2 | Obra e vida de Cecilia Meirelles | Júlio Mattos |
| 1976 | 8th place | Grupo 2 | Cobra Norato | |
| 1977 | 17th place | Grupo 2 | Brasil caboclo | Mauro Rosas |
| 1978 | 6th place | Grupo 3 | Carnaval de Ontem e de Hoje | |
| 1979 | 6th place | Grupo 2A | Orlando Silva | |
| 1980 | Champion | Grupo 2B | É a sorte | Maria Augusta |
| 1980 | Champion | Grupo 2B | É a sorte | Paulo Peçanha |
| 1981 | 9th place | Grupo 2A | Exaltação a Vinícius de Moraes | Maria Augusta |
| 1981 | 9th place | Grupo 2A | Exaltação a Vinícius de Moraes | Paulo Peçanha |
| 1982 | Vice Champion | Grupo 2A | Alegria | Maria Augusta |
| 1982 | Vice Champion | Grupo 2A | Alegria | Paulo Peçanha |
| 1983 | 8th place | Grupo 1B | Vamos falar de amor | Maria Augusta |
| 1983 | 8th place | Grupo 1B | Vamos falar de amor | Paulo Peçanha |
| 1984 | 11th place | Grupo 1B | 1984, um ano de otimismo | Billy Acioli |
| 1984 | 11th place | Grupo 1B | 1984, um ano de otimismo | Paulo Peçanha |
| 1985 | 3rd place | Grupo 2A | Axé raça negra | Billy Acioli |
| 1985 | 3rd place | Grupo 2A | Axé raça negra | Rodolfo da Bacia |
| 1986 | 4th place | Grupo 2A | A neta da Chiquita Bacana | Billy Acioli |
| 1986 | 4th place | Grupo 2A | A neta da Chiquita Bacana | Rodolfo da Bacia |
| 1987 | Champion | Grupo 3 | Força viva do samba, pagode | Júlio Mattos |
| 1987 | Champion | Grupo 3 | Força viva do samba, pagode | Rodolfo da Bacia |
| 1988 | 6th place | Grupo 2 | Filho de branco é menino, filho de negro é moleque; Moleque taí? Vem cá moleque, vem cá apanhar | Júlio Mattos |
| 1988 | 6th place | Grupo 2 | Filho de branco é menino, filho de negro é moleque; Moleque taí? Vem cá moleque, vem cá apanhar | Rodolfo da Bacia |
| 1989 | 6th place | Grupo 2 | Folclore, tradição popular | Júlio Mattos |
| 1989 | 6th place | Grupo 2 | Folclore, tradição popular | Jair |
| 1990 | 9th place | Grupo A | Eneida, o Pierrot está de volta | Júlio Mattos |
| 1990 | 9th place | Grupo A | Eneida, o Pierrot está de volta | Bidubi |
| 1991 | 11th place | Grupo A | Asa Branca | Beto Maia; Lu Ferreira |
| 1991 | 11th place | Grupo A | Asa Branca | Pedrinho da Flor |
| 1992 | 10th place | Grupo B | Será que vai dar praia? | Máslova Valença; Fernanda Junqueira |
| 1993 | 11th place | Grupo B | Os Anjos | Guilherme Santos |
| 1994 | 10th place | Grupo B | Nas asas do Tuiuti | Billy Acioli |
| 1995 | 5th place | Grupo B | Recycla Brasil | Sérgio Marimba |
| 1996 | 3rd place | Grupo C | A Raça em Movimento | Sérgio Marimba |
| 1997 | Champion | Grupo C | Um príncipe negro nas ruas do Rio | Sérgio Marimba |
| 1998 | 4th place | Grupo B | Oui, oui, a França esteve aqui | Soller Divino |
| 1998 | 4th place | Grupo B | Oui, oui, a França esteve aqui | Nélio Marins |
| 1999 | 3rd place | Grupo B | Uma delícia glacial no país do Carnaval | Paulo Menezes |
| 1999 | 3rd place | Grupo B | Uma delícia glacial no país do Carnaval | Ciganerey |
| 2000 | Vice-Champion | Grupo A | Um monarca na fuzarca | Paulo Menezes |
| 2000 | Vice-Champion | Grupo A | Um monarca na fuzarca | Ciganerey |
| 2001 | 14th place | Grupo Especial | Um mouro no quilombo: Isto a história registra | Paulo Menezes |
| 2001 | 14th place | Grupo Especial | Um mouro no quilombo: Isto a história registra | Ciganerey |
| 2002 | 4th place | Grupo A | Arlindo, arlequins e querubins: Um Carnaval no Paraíso | Paulo Menezes |
| 2002 | 4th place | Grupo A | Arlindo, arlequins e querubins: Um Carnaval no Paraíso | Ciganerey |
| 2003 | 4th place | Grupo A | Tuiuti desfila o Brasil em telas de Portinari | Paulo Barros |
| 2003 | 4th place | Grupo A | Tuiuti desfila o Brasil em telas de Portinari | Clóvis Pê |
| 2004 | 8th place | Grupo A | Olha Que Coisa Mais Linda, o Poeta Está No Paraíso | Jaime Cezário |
| 2004 | 8th place | Grupo A | Olha Que Coisa Mais Linda, o Poeta Está No Paraíso | Ciganerey |
| 2005 | 9th place | Grupo A | Cravo de Ouro, Eu Também Sou da Lira e Não Quero Negar | Rodrigo Siqueira |
| 2005 | 9th place | Grupo A | Cravo de Ouro, Eu Também Sou da Lira e Não Quero Negar | Ciganerey |
| 2006 | 2nd place | Grupo B | O Imperador Morava Ali, do Outro Lado do Tuiuti | Marcos Januário; Marcelo Andrade |
| 2006 | 2nd place | Grupo B | O Imperador Morava Ali, do Outro Lado do Tuiuti | Serginho Gama |
| 2007 | 3rd place | Grupo B | Vamos falar de amor | Marcelo Andrade |
| 2007 | 3rd place | Grupo B | Vamos falar de amor | Alex Tuiuti |
| 2008 | Vice Champion | Group B | Cartola, Teu Cenário É Uma Beleza | Eduardo Silva |
| 2008 | Vice Champion | Group B | Cartola, Teu Cenário É Uma Beleza | Ciganerey |
| 2009 | 7th place | Grupo A | O Cassino da Urca | Eduardo Gonçalves |
| 2009 | 7th place | Grupo A | O Cassino da Urca | Ciganerey |
| 2010 | 12th place | Grupo A | Eneida, o Pierrot está de volta | Eduardo Gonçalves |
| 2010 | 12th place | Grupo A | Eneida, o Pierrot está de volta | Anderson Paz |
| 2011 | Champion | Grupo B | O mais doce bárbaro - Caetano Veloso | Eduardo Gonçalves |
| 2011 | Champion | Grupo B | O mais doce bárbaro - Caetano Veloso | Daniel Silva |
| 2012 | 9th place | Grupo A | Clara Nunes - A Tal Mineira | Jack Vasconcelos |
| 2012 | 9th place | Grupo A | Clara Nunes - A Tal Mineira | Daniel Silva |
| 2013 | 13th place | Série A | Ao Mestre do Riso com carinho: As caras do Brasil | Cid Carvalho |
| 2013 | 13th place | Série A | Ao Mestre do Riso com carinho: As caras do Brasil | Daniel Silva |
| 2014 | 8th place | Série A | Kizomba, a festa da raça | Severo Luzardo |
| 2014 | 8th place | Série A | Kizomba, a festa da raça | Daniel Silva |
| 2015 | 5th place | Série A | Curumim chama Cunhantã que eu vou contar... | Jack Vasconcelos |
| 2015 | 5th place | Série A | Curumim chama Cunhantã que eu vou contar... | Daniel Silva |
| 2016 | Champion | Série A | A farra do Boi | Jack Vasconcelos |
| 2016 | Champion | Série A | A farra do Boi | Daniel Silva; Leandro Santos |
| 2017 | 12th place | Grupo Especial | Carnavaleidoscópio Tropifágico | Jack Vasconcelos |
| 2017 | 12th place | Grupo Especial | Carnavaleidoscópio Tropifágico | Wantuir |
| 2018 | Vice Champion | Grupo Especial | Meu Deus, Meu Deus, está extinta a escravidão? | Jack Vasconcelos |
| 2018 | Vice Champion | Grupo Especial | Meu Deus, Meu Deus, está extinta a escravidão? | Nino do Milênio; Celsinho Mody; Grazzi Brasil |
| 2019 | 8th place | Grupo Especial | O Salvador da Pátria | Jack Vasconcelos |
| 2019 | 8th place | Grupo Especial | O Salvador da Pátria | Celsinho Mody; Grazzi Brasil |
| 2020 | 11th place | Grupo Especial | O Santo e o Rei: Encantarias de Sebastião | João Vítor Araújo |
| 2020 | 11th place | Grupo Especial | O Santo e o Rei: Encantarias de Sebastião | Celsinho Mody; Nino do Milênio |
| 2022 | 11th place | Grupo Especial | Soltando os bichos | Paulo Barros |
| 2022 | 11th place | Grupo Especial | Soltando os bichos | Celsinho Mody; Carlos Júnior |
| 2023 | | Grupo Especial | | Rosa Magalhães; João Vítor Araújo |
| 2023 | | Grupo Especial | | Celsinho Mody; Carlos Júnior |
