= Results of the 2016 São Paulo Carnival =

This page lists the results of the 2016 São Paulo Carnival.

== Grupo Especial ==
Pos	Samba schools	Pts	Classification or relegation
1	Império de Casa Verde	269.4	Carnival
2	Acadêmicos do Tatuapé	269.1	Champions Parade
3	Mocidade Alegre	269.1	Champions Parade
4	Vai-Vai	268.8	Champions Parade
5	Unidos de Vila Maria	268.4	Champions Parade
6	Dragões da Real	268.4	
7	Gaviões da Fiel	268.3	
8	Águia de Ouro	268.2	
9	Nenê de Vila Matilde	268	
10	Acadêmicos do Tucuruvi	267.6	
11	Rosas de Ouro	267.6	
12	Unidos do Peruche	264.7	
13	Pérola Negra	264	Relegation to 2017 Grupo de acesso
14	X-9 Paulistana	263.9	Relegation to 2017 Grupo de acesso

== Grupo de acesso ==
Pos	Samba schools	Pts	Classification or relegation
1	Mancha Verde	269.4	Promotion to 2017 Grupo Especial
2	Tom Maior	268.2	Promotion to 2017 Grupo Especial
3	Independente Tricolor	267.8	
4	Camisa Verde e Branco	267.7	
5	Imperador do Ipiranga	266.4	
6	Leandro de Itaquera	265.2	
7	Colorado do Brás	265	
8	Barroca Zona Sul	264.3	Relegation to 2017 Grupo 1-UESP
9	Morro da Casa Verde	262.6	Relegation to 2017 Grupo 1-UESP

== Grupo 1 ==
Pos	Samba schools	Pts	Classification or relegation
1	Estrela do Terceiro Milênio	259.3	Promotion to 2017 Grupo de accesso
2	Torcida Jovem	258.8	
3	Dom Bosco	258.7	
4	Prova de Fogo	258.6	
5	Uirapuru da Mooca	258.2	
6	Tradição Albertinense	257.6	
7	Unidos de Santa Bárbara	257.5	
8	Combinados de Sapopemba	257	
9	Amizade da Zona Leste	256.8	
10	Unidos de São Lucas	254.9	Relegation to 2017 Grupo 2-UESP
11	Flor da Vila Dalila	254.4	Relegation to 2017 Grupo 2-UESP

== Grupo 2 ==
Pos	Samba schools	Pts	Classification or relegation
1	Mocidade Unida da Mooca	269.8	Promotion to 2017 Grupo 1-UESP
2	Flor de Lis da Zona Sul	268.5	Promotion to 2017 Grupo 1-UESP
3	União da Vila Albertina	268.4	
4	Acadêmicos de São Jorge	268.3	
5	Camisa 12	267.9	
6	Unidos do Vale Encantado	267.3	
7	União Imperial	266.9	
8	Boêmios da Vila	266.7	
9	Império Lapeano	266.3	
10	União Independente da Zona Sul	265.6	
11	Acadêmicos do Ipiranga	264.3	Relegation to 2017 Grupo 3-UESP
12	Unidos de São Miguel	263.3	Relegation to 2017 Grupo 3-UESP

== Grupo 3 ==
Pos	Samba schools	Pts	Classification or relegation
1	Brinco da Marquesa	180.1	Promotion to 2017 Grupo 2-UESP
2	Imperatriz da Sul	179.6	Promotion to 2017 Grupo 2-UESP
3	Dragões de Vila Alpina	179.3	
4	Iracema Meu Grande Amor	178.8	
5	Estação Invernada	178.8	
6	Lavapés	178.7	
7	Mocidade Robruense	178.1	
8	Príncipe Negro	178	
9	Imperatriz da Paulicéia	177.7	
10	Passo de Ouro	177.4	
11	Unidos de Guaianases	176.7	Relegation to 2017 Grupo 4-UESP
12	Folha Verde	176.7	Relegation to 2017 Grupo 4-UESP

== Grupo 4 ==
Pos	Samba schools	Pts	Classification or relegation
1	Em Cima da Hora Paulistana	178.3	Relegation to 2017 Grupo 4-UESP
2	Primeira da Cidade Líder	178	Relegation to 2017 Grupo 4-UESP
3	Torcida Uniformizada do Palmeiras	177.5	
4	Estrela Cadente	177	
5	Explosão da Zona Norte	176.6	
6	Primeira da Aclimação	175	
7	Portela da Zona Sul	174.9	
8	Só Vou se Você For	174.5	
9	Os Bambas	170.6	
10	Valença de Perus	0.0	
11	Folha Azul dos Marujos	0.0	

== See also ==
- Results of the 2016 Rio Carnival
