= Gaviões da Fiel =

- Foundation: 1 July 1969; 57 years ago
- Colors: Black and White
- Symbol: Hawk
- President: Alexandre Domênico Pereira (Alê)

Website
- gavioes.com.br

Grêmio Recreativo Cultural e Escola de Samba Gaviões da Fiel Torcida (G.R.C.E.S. Gaviões da Fiel Torcida) is the largest torcida organizada of SC Corinthians Paulista. The organization is also a samba school in the city of São Paulo. It was founded in 1969 and is based in the neighborhood of Bom Retiro. It has over 140,000 associates. It was the first torcida organizada in Brazil to have an internal administrative structure that's regulated by statutory rules. In Gaviões, the Carnaval departments and the associates linked to football are part of the same entity.

The torcida had major growth by the 1990s; many of its members became involved in fights against members of other torcidas, which led to the Public Prosecutor's Office to request for the entity's dissolution in 1997. The organization was suspended at points by injunction for its activities as a torcida.

== History ==
The Gaviões was created in 1969, but meetings between fans of Corinthians had been occurring since at least 1965. They had the objective of creating an entity that would not just be a torcida organization, but also a vehicle for action in the political-administrative area for Corinthians. Its principal objective, at the time, was the removal of director Wadih Helu, who had been the president of the club since 1961.

=== First parades and change of base ===
Flávio La Selva was member number one of Gaviões da Fiel. Since the beginning, members of the organization have participated actively in the parades of the samba school, initially as a wing of the samba school Vai-Vai, which also has the same colors as Corinthians. In the beginning, their headquarters was in a garage in the Zona Norte of São Paulo. Their base was later moved to Rua Santa Efigênia in 1974, becoming the first public base of the entity. In 1975, the torcida started to parade in the official line of blocos in the city of São Paulo. Gaviões would win 12 times in 13 years of competing. In 1978, they opened their current headquarters in the neighborhood of Bom Retiro.

The Gaviões began to officially compete as a samba school in 1989, coming in second place in group 1 (the current Grupo de Acesso). In 1990, it finished in ninth place among ten schools and was relegated. In 1991, however, it won the Grupo de Acesso, later finishing in eighth place in the Lugar no Grupo Especial in 1992.

In 1993, the school came in fifth place with the enredo A Chave do Tempo, and in 1994, they were the vice-champion, beaten only by Rosas de Ouro.

In 1995, Gaviões became champions for the first time with the famous enredo Coisa Boa é pra Sempre.

Due to its nature of the organization being both a samba school and a torcida organization, the Gaviões have gained visibility at Carnaval; This not just extends to the São Paulo Carnaval, but also the carnavals in other states, such as the Rio Carnaval, for example as well as gaining the support among the other Corinthians supporters, even those who support other samba schools.

In 1996, the school came in fourth place with the enredo "Quem Viver Verá o Vinte Virar", penned by carnaval organizer Raul Diniz. In 1997, the school came in fifth with "Mundo da Rua". This was followed by one of their many homages to Corinthians in 1998.

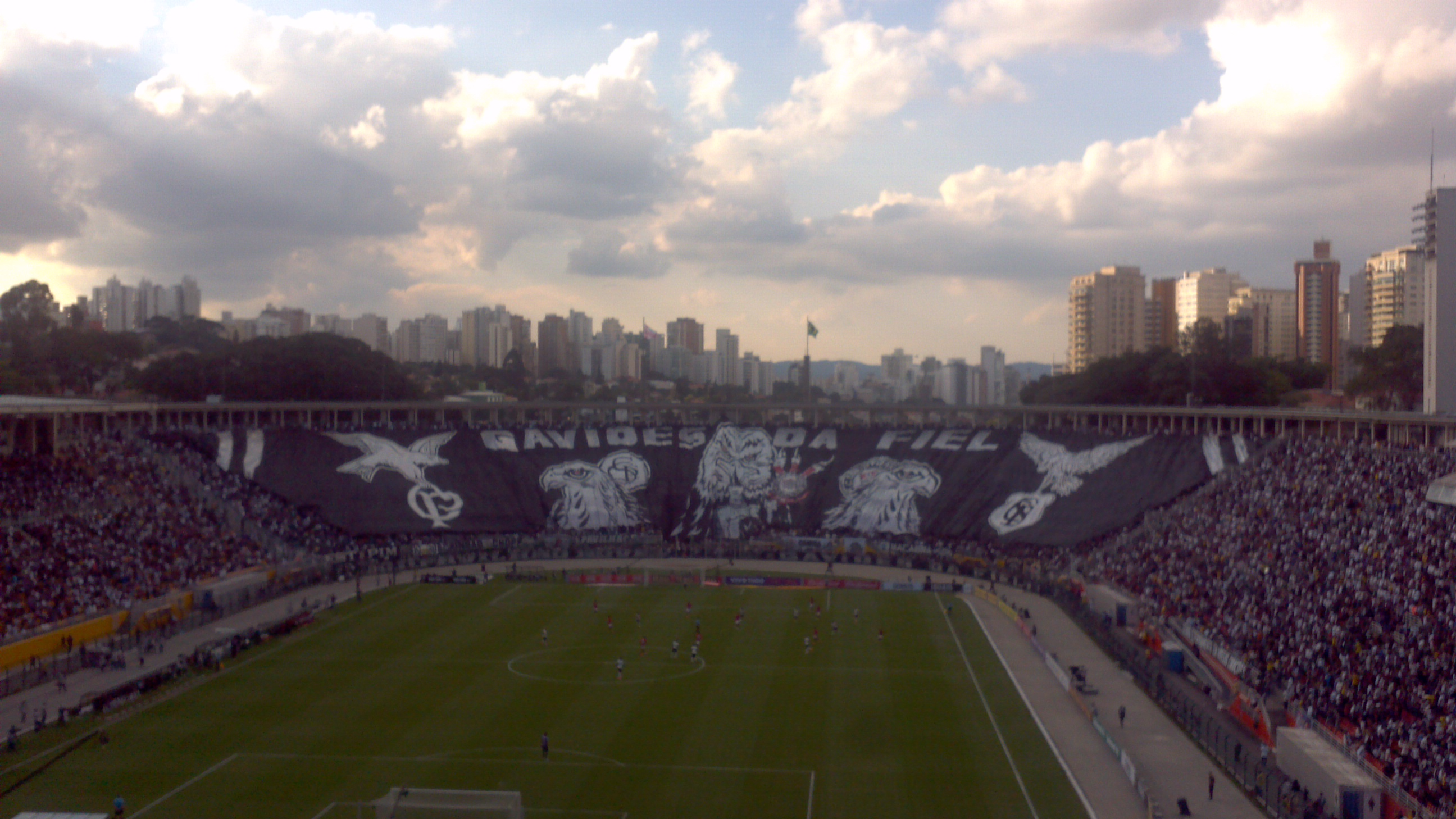
Bandeirão dos Gaviões during the last official departure of Corinthians at Pacaembu Stadium in 2014.

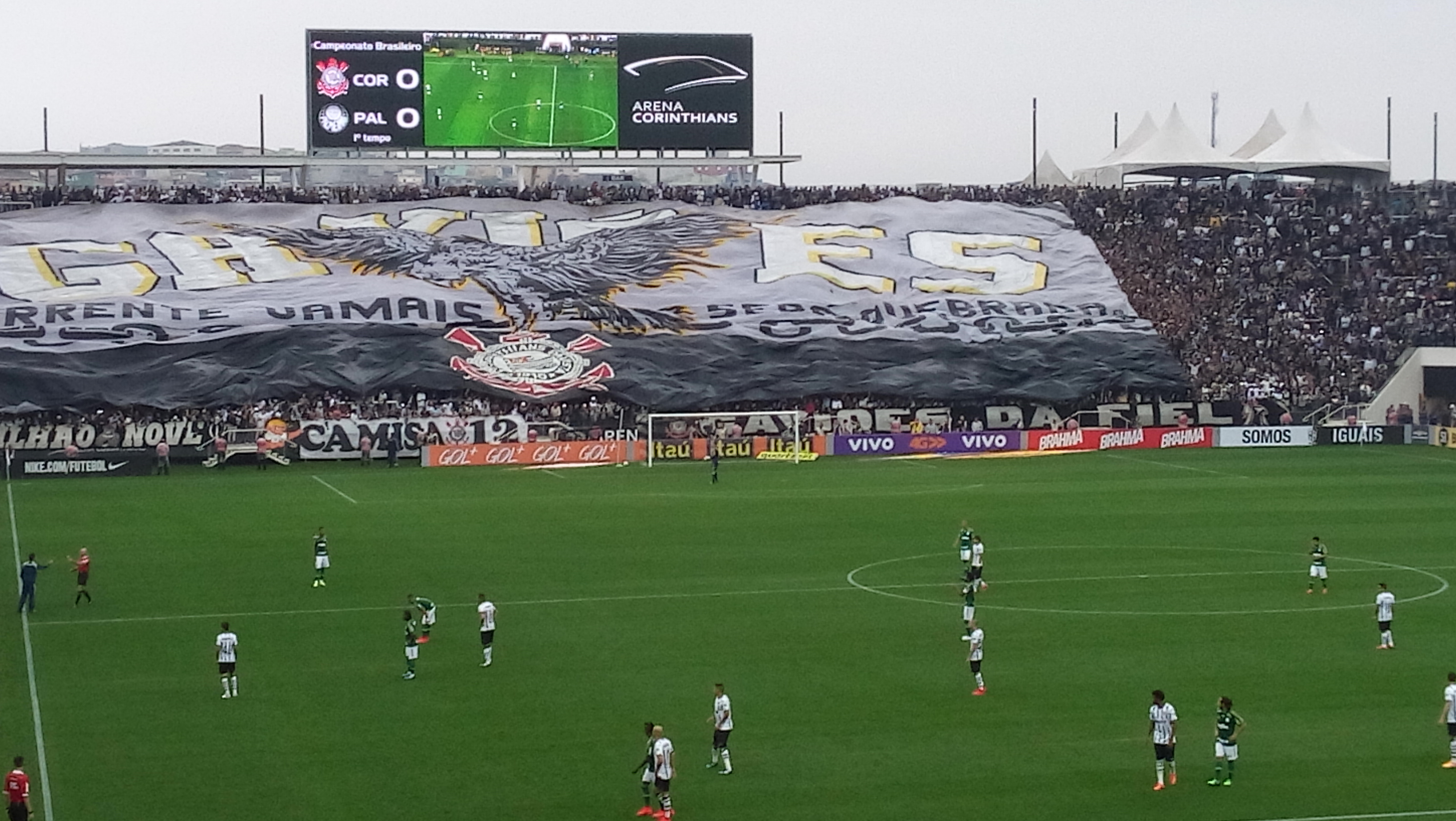
Bandeirão dos Gaviões at the Derby Paulista at Arena Corinthians.

In 1999, the Gaviões da Fiel won that year's Carnaval with the enredo "O Príncipe Encoberto ou a busca de S. Sebastião na Ilha de São Luís do Maranhão", tying with Vai-Vai. Had there been in place the current rules dealing with ties, Gaviões would have been declared the victors.

In 2000, the school was the last to parade that night, presenting "Um Voo Para a Liberdade", a thematic piece on the 500th anniversary of the Portuguese first encountered what is now Brazil.

In 2001, the school betted on a large investment towards their carnaval blocs, building allegorical cars and costumes. They also became the samba school with the most expensive abre-alas at that time. "Mitos e Magias na Triunfante Odisseia da Criação" spoke on the origins of the creation of the world and was the school's bet with carnaval organizer Jorge Marcos Freitas. They came in fourth place that year, behind eventual winner Nenê de Vila Matilde.

In 2002, Gaviões competed with Xeque-Mate, which was a tribute to the game of chess while also making strong political and social criticisms. The enredo won that year's Carnaval and was used during that year's elections.

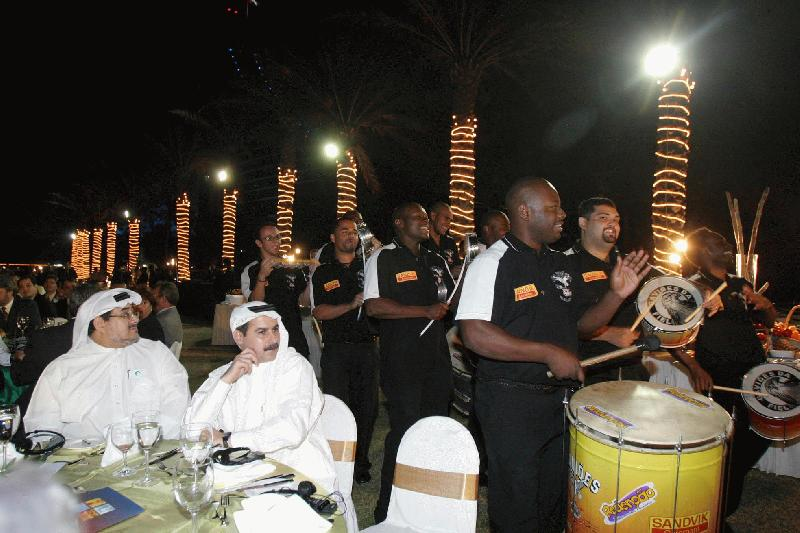
Bateria da Gaviões, wearing Middle-Eastern style clothing

In 2003, Gaviões was again the runners-up at Carnaval with an enredo about the five regions of Brazil, "As Cinco Deusas Encantadas na Corte do Rei Gavião", again written by Jorge Freitas.

For 2004, almost ten years after their first title in the Grupo Especial and having already consolidated itself as one of the largest samba schools in São Paulo, Gaviões da Fiel was the favorite to win three times in a row when, in their carnaval bloc about the 450th anniversary of the city of São Paulo, one of the cars that talked about the "revolução corintiana" had problems with its axle with an allegory that represented a Corinthians player becoming stuck in the speaker and the clock of the Sambódromo, even collapsing in the latter. This made the school run out of time in 5 minutes, losing 8 points in total, along with receiving low notes in terms of its evolution. The school came in last place.

In 2005, Gaviões had problems once again with their carnaval bloc, but received help from LigaSP, which allowed Gaviões more time to start their carnaval bloc, leading it to win the Grupo de Acesso again.

2006 was the first year in which two schools linked to torcidas were in the Grupo Especial at the same time: Gaviões (the first to parade on Friday) and Mancha Verde (which supports Palmeiras; they were the second to last to perform starting that Saturday morning and into Sunday). The Gaviões, however, won in court the right to normally participate in the Grupo Especial. Mancha Verde, meanwhile, would dispute alone for two years among sports schools.

That year however, there were fears among some of the sambistas that fights between the torcidas could affect the event. Due to this, regulations were passed to require that the torcida schools must parade on separate days (in this case, from Sunday morning to Monday), disputing in that way at the Grupo Especial. However, with less than a week before the start of Carnaval, Gaviões da Fiel gained an injunction that guaranteed that they could dispute the Grupo Especial, opening the parade on Friday.

This should have restarted their parade, but the school ended up losing their regulated time, causing a loss of points. In the calculation of points, they were penalized further due to showing the shield of Corinthians on one of its cars (despite having won the right in the courts to show them), and for supposed advertising on one of the other cars (as there was a generators business' logo on a car during the parade, which should have been hidden), losing four points in total. To this, adding to fact that the jurors gave very low marks to the school, for example their bateria, resulted in them being demoted again. The school's management affirmed that they would abandon their samba school parades with LigaSP.

In 2007, the Gaviões da Fiel paraded in the Grupo de Acesso with 4 cars and 3,000 components divided into 22 wings. The enredo was dedicaded to Father José de Anchieta and contributed to them being named once again the new champion of the Categoria de Acesso.

For 2008, there were two possibilities: the Gaviões would participate in the Grupo Especial das Escolas Esportivas together with Mancha Verde, or there could be the possibility of the school competing in the traditional Grupo Especial, reinforced by the same injunction that guaranteed it this right in 2006. Meanwhile, in July 2007, after a new meeting of LigaSP, it was decided that they viewed the division as extinct, and thus returning to the schools that would dispute the Grupo Especial.

For carnaval that year, the Gaviões had as their them the city of Santana do Parnaíba, situated in Greater São Paulo. As the champion of the Grupo de Acesso, they were the first school to parade. The school impressed with their allegories and costumes. However, they were considered to have presented at a level below in relation to other organizations and even to their previous performances. Once again, their members had to run the final part of the parade to not go over the maximum timelimit of 65 minutes, which resulted in the loss of points due to perceptions of evolution of harmony. They came in eleventh place.

For Carnaval 2009, the Gaviões brought carnaval organizer Zilkson Reis, who came from Mocidade Alegre, and carnaval director Igor Carneiro. This year, the enredo "O sonho comanda a vida, quando o homem sonha, o mundo avança", the school spoke of the invention of the wheel and paid tribute to their most well-known supporter: Ayrton Senna, who is today hommaged by the club. The club came in fourth place, returning to the parade of champions after five years.

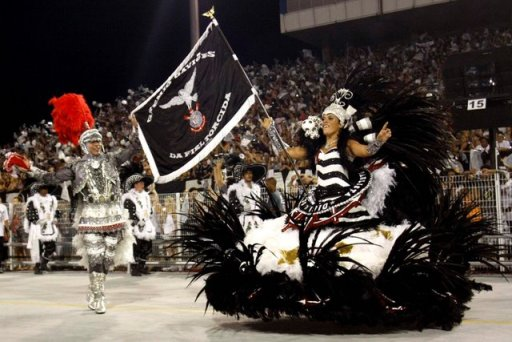
Mestre Sala and Porta Bandeira in 2010

In 2010, the school paid tribute to the 100th anniversary of Corinthians with the enredo "Corinthians... Minha vida, minha história, meu amor!". Along with this, the madrinha of the bateria was replaced, with Lívia Andrade being replaced by Sabrina Sato. During the tallying of the vote, supporters, outraged by the score given to the school, began to through bottles onto the ground of the Sambadrome after the directors of the school were angered by the result. The school came in fifth place.

In 2011, they based their enredo after the city of Dubai. Despite not being a fan favorite of the torcida, the school had a more technical approach that rendered them a fifth place. In 2012, they would give homage to president Luiz Inácio Lula da Silva. At the time, Lula was recovering from a tumor in his larynx, and based on medical advice, did not participate in the parade. He instead watched the enredo on television at his residence. He recorded a video, meanwhile, giving thanks to the school's homage. The video was projected onto a screen in the last car, where his wife, Marisa Letícia Lula da Silva, paraded. The bateria paraded with a costumes of Lula. Despite the large amount of money spent on the enredo, there were problems with its evolution and obtained a score of 8.9, with them only receiving the maximum score in their bateria and their enredo.

Before the classic match against Palmeiras on 25 March 2012, supporters of both Corinthians and Palmeiras began fighting on Avenida Inajar de Souza. Two Palmeiras fans were killed. The Federação Paulista de Futebol prohibited both Gaviões da Fiel and Mancha Alviverde from entering stadiums in the city with any material that mentioned the names of the fans that died until the case surrounding the fight was finished. The president of Gaviões, Donizete, was jailed for 18 days after being accused of omissions.

In 2013, the school took on the history of Brazilian advertising and publicity in the enredo: "Ser Fiel é a alma do negócio", developed by carnaval organizer Max Lopes. Different than other years, they had brightly colored costumes. They tied in points with Nenê de Vila Matilde and X-9 Paulistana. They all earned ninth place.

In February 2013, supporters of Corinthians and members of the Gaviões were arrested in Bolivia after the tragedy at Oruro Stadium in Oruro, where a Bolivian teenager was killed by a flare fired by a member of the Gaviões. In April 2013, Gaviões elected a new president.

For Carnaval 2014, they paid tribute to a legend in world soccer, Ronaldo, recounting his life story and his childhood living in poverty in Bento Ribeiro. The enredo, "R9 - O voo real do Fenômeno", had 4,000 components divided into 24 wings.

Meanwhile, for Carnaval 2015, the group performed with the enredo "No jogo enigmático das cartas, desvendem os mistérios e façam suas apostas, pois a sorte está lançada!". The school initially was in first place during half of the voting period, but lost points in the Mestre-Sala and Porta-Bandeira, Costume and Evolution category, falling to ninth place.

In 2016, the school went to Anhembi with the enredo "É fantástico! Imagine, admire e sinta". A tradicional escola mostrou um belo desfile ao responder a pergunta: "o que é fantástico?". With a large parade and bleachers full of anxiously waiting fans, the school received low notes, mainly in the Evolution and Harmony category, and ended in seventh place.

In 2017, the Fiel chose their parade to portray the life of the migrants who moved to São Paulo and helped in the development of the city. The school showed how the people of other states came to the city and made it their new home, as will as the difficulties and achievements that the people that, even as they missed their hometown, made São Paulo the massive metropolis it is today. The school ended in ninth and were among the first five picked, but they were put outside the championships.

The Gaviões da Fiel's 2018 submission was the enredo: “Guarus – Na Aurora da Criação, a Profecia Tupi... Prosperidade e Paz aos Mensageiros de Rudá” which tells, through Tupi mythology, the saga of the Guaru people, who give their name to the city of Guarulhos. The school did a parade with a renewed aesthetic in comparison to prior years due to the influence of the new carnaval organizer Sidnei França. They ended in seventh place.

Abre-alas from the 2019 parade.

The school then went onto the street in 2019 with the enredo "A saliva do santo e o veneno da serpente". The Fiel reedited the enredo from 1994 that gave their school the vice-champion spot that year. They received a good rating on the stage and had an impactful performance, but ultimately ended in ninth place.

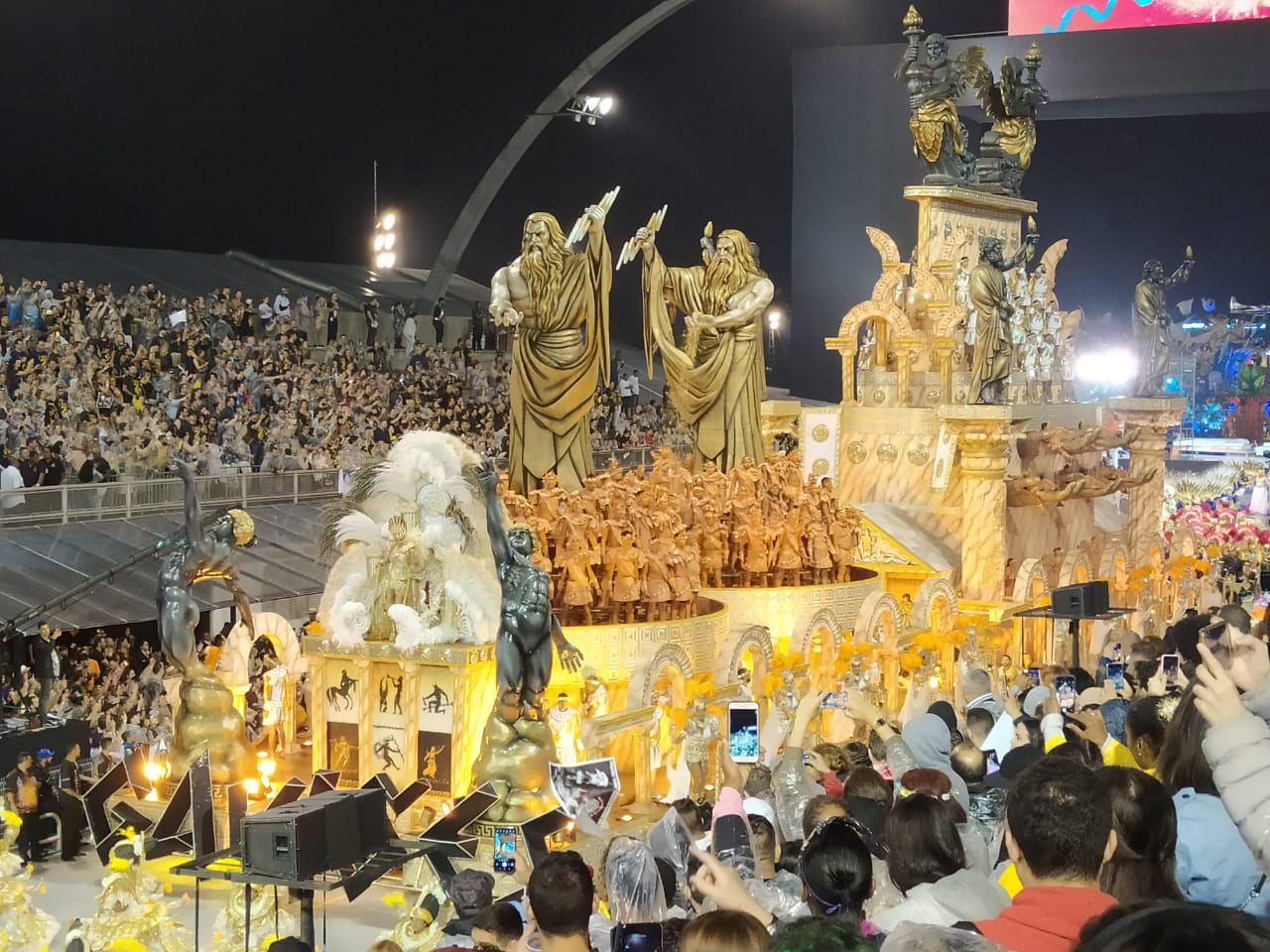
Abre-alas of the school in 2020.

For 2020, they gained attention for hiring Paulo Barros from Rio de Janeiro, who became a recognizable name in the scene by that time and produced hype that the Gaviões would win the title or at the least go into the champions parade. They made a massive performance with well-designed costumes and floats. However, during the portion where some of the floats would catch on fire, one of the did not. Despite the attention, however, they came in eleventh place.

The group began to renew their contract with Barros, which excited the torcida. However, he was replaced by Zilkson Reis some time after. Through this period of change after change, the Gaviões announced in 2021 that they would have the enredo "BASTA", which talks about injustice and protests against prejudice. With the postponement of the parade to April 2022 due to COVID-19, the Gaviões suffered a setback after violent attacks against the Carnaval organizer who was responsible for the project by another member of the school. With Zilkson forced out of the position, Júlio Poloni, who was then a writer of enredos, finalized that year's parade with the support of booth director Fábio Lima, by scenic director Diego Bernardes, and other members who took on the fundamental activities in Zilkson's absence. The Gaviões was the second school to parade that Saturday for Carnaval. Despite the parade being somewhat overshadowed by what had happened to Zilkson, and a possible financial crisis, they had a parade that surprised critics, despite having issues with the plastic in their allegories. They came in eighth place.

For 2023, the organization brought Poloni in again and hired André Marins, who was unaffiliated since his departure from Tom Maior in 2020. Still facing financial issues, the school took to the streets with the enredo "Em Nome do Pai, dos Filhos, dos Espíritos e dos Santos", exalting religious diversity. The Gaviões came in ninth place.

Carnaval 2024, however, brought the school into a new era with the enredo "Vou te Levar pro Infinito". Gaviões da Fiel returned to the champions league after a gap of 13 years, coming in fourth place. This Carnaval saw the debut of Rayner Pereira as a carnaval organizer, who had been active in the São Paulo since 2015. He had support from artists such as Sidnei França, Paulo Barros, and Paulo Menezes, and worked with samba schools such as Mocidade Alegre, Águia de Ouro, Rosas de Ouro and Gaviões da Fiel. Rodrigo Meiners, the former Carnaval organizer of Mocidade Unida da Mooca and Barroca Zona Sul also became part of the parade alongside Pereira and Poloni.

With Meiners' departure, the Gaviões da Fiel went to Carnaval 2025 with Pereira and Poloni. The Carnaval organizers created the first enredo from Gaviões that incorporates African themes. "Irin Ajó Emi Ojisé" explores the symbolism of African masks, contextualizing them as a poetic reinterpretation and bringing to Carnaval the history of Africa itself, displaying Orumilá as the main character that walked throughout the continent and stopped at each nation to learn the sacred traditions of the masks of each people. With an impeccable and strong samba-enredo, the Gaviões had their best result since 2003, coming in third place.

For Carnaval 2026, Gaviões da Fiel renewed their contract with Pereira and Poloni and had Ernesto Teixeira as their interpreter. He became the longest-running Carnaval singer in Brazil after the retirement of Beija-Flor's Neguinho da Beija-Flor. With the enredo "Vozes Ancestrais Para Um Novo Amanhã", the Gaviões takes on a spiritual perspective about the preservation of nature. The guide of the narrative resides in the legend of Yakoana, the sacred sayings utilized by Yanomami leaders to access spiritual dimensions. Through this theme, the school portrayed the forest as a living and sacred organism.

== Organization ==
=== Presidents ===
Term	Name	Ref.
1969 – 1971	Flávio Tadeu Garcia La Selva	
1971 – 1973	Alcides Jorge de Souza Piva (Joca)	
1973 – 1975	Andres Moreno Castilho	
1975 – 1977	Júlio César de Toledo	
1977 – 1979	Roberto Daga	
1979 – 1981	Tadeu Aparecido de Souza Piva	
1981 – 1983	Luiz Antônio Achôa Mezher (Magrão)	
1983 – 1985	Avelino Leonardo Gomes (Bigode)	
1985 – 1987	José Lucas Amaral da Silva	
1987 – 1989	Ariovaldo Aparecido da Silva	
1989 – 1991	Luiz Antônio Achôa Mezher (Magrão)	
1991 – 1993	Alex Simão Araújo	
1993 – 1995	José Cláudio de Almeida Moraes (Dentinho)	
1995 – 1997	Paulo Eduardo Romano (Jamelão)	
1997 – 1999	Douglas Deungaro (Metaleiro)	
1999 – 2001	José Cláudio de Almeida Moraes (Dentinho)	
2001 – 2003	Marcelo Caetano Carreiro (Pantcho)	
2003 – 2005	Ronaldo Pinto	
2005 – 2007	Wellington Rocha Jr. (Tonhão)	
2007 – 2009	Herbert César Ferreira	
2009 – 2011	Eduardo Araújo Fontes (Pantchinho)	
2011 – 2013	Antonio Alan Souza Silva (Donizete)	
2013 – 2015	Wagner da Costa (BO)	
2015 – 2018	Rodrigo Fonseca (Diguinho)	
2018 –2021	Rodrigo Gonzalez Tapia (Digão Vila Moraes)	
2021-2024	Amilton Alves Brito (Padinho)	
2024–present	Alexandre Domênico Pereira (Ale)	

=== Interpreters ===
Carnaval(s)	Official interpreter	Ref.
1976	Osvaldinho da Cuíca	
1977-1979	Serginho Bala	
1980-1983	Armando da Mangueira	
1984	Thobias da Vai-Vai	
1985–present	Ernesto Teixeira	

=== Directors ===
Period	Carnaval director	Harmony director	Mestre de Bateria	Ref.
2009-2010-2011-2012	Igor Carneiro	Harmony commission	Mestre Pantchinho	
2013	Dentinho and Miranda	Harmony commission	Mestre Pantchinho	
2014-2015	Carnaval commission	Harmony commission	Mestre Pantchinho	
2016	Wagner da Costa, Márcio de Souza and Milton Silva	Regina Dercoli, Ricardo Amorim, Márcio Rodrigues, and Milton Silva	Mestre Pantchinho	
2017	Wagner da Costa, Márcio de Souza and Milton Silva	Regina Dercoli, Ricardo Amorim, and Jorge Setin	Mestre Pantchinho	
2018-2020	Wagner da Costa and Márcio de Souza	Regina Dercoli, Ricardo Amorim, Jorge Setin, Rogério Lencione, Maicon Oliveira, and Wilton Ferreira	Mestre Ciro Castilho	
2022–present	Carnaval commission	Harmony commission	Mestre Ciro Castilho	

=== Choreographers ===
Year	Name	Ref.
2006-2008	Oyama Queiroz	
2009-2015	Helena Figueira	
2016	Roberta Melo	
2017	Helena Figueira	
2018-2020	Edgar Júnior	
2022-2024	Sérgio Cardoso	
2025–present	Helena Figueira	

=== Mestre-Sala and Porta-Bandeira ===
Period	Name	Ref.
1994-2007	Michel e Ildely	
2008-2014	Dorgival (Bozó) and Gislene (Gi)	
2015-2019	Wagner Araujo and Adriana Modjian	
2020-2023	Wagner Araujo and Gabriela Mondjian	
2024–present	Wagner Araujo and Carolline Barbosa	

=== Bateria Court ===
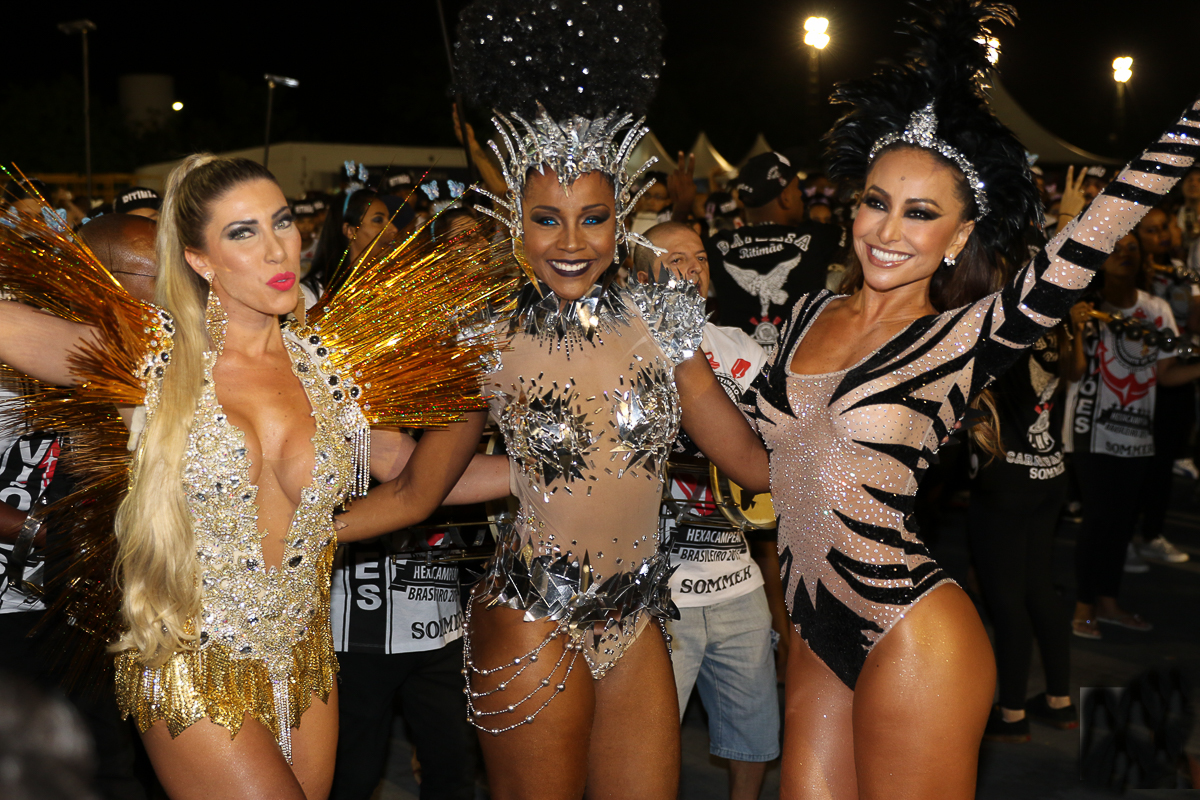
From left to right: Tatiane Minerato, Thainara Primo, and Sabrina Sato in 2016

Period	Rainha	Madrinha	Musa	Imperatriz	Ref.
1990-1998	Adriana Borges		Ana Farias		
1999–2002	Juliana Oliveira				
2003–2005	Lívia Andrade	Juliana Oliveira			
2006–2008	Lívia Andrade		Tati Minerato		
2009	Tati Minerato	Lívia Andrade			
2010–2014	Tati Minerato	Sabrina Sato			
2015–2016	Tati Minerato	Sabrina Sato	Thainara Primo		
2017	Tati Minerato	Sabrina Sato	Thainara Primo	Renatta Teruel	
2018		Sabrina Sato			
2019–present	Sabrina Sato				

== Titles ==
Titles
Division	Total	Years
Grupo Especial	4	1995, 1999, 2002, 2003
Grupo de Acesso	3	1991, 2005, 2007
Bloco Especial	12	1976, 1977, 1978, 1979, 1981, 1982, 1983, 1984, 1985, 1986, 1987, 1988

== Carnavals ==
Gaviões da Fiel
Year	Placement	Group	Enredo	Carnaval organizer	Ref.
1976	Champions	Bloco especial	Vai Corinthians Composers: Osvaldinho da Cuíca and Papeti	Carnaval Commission	
1977	Champions	Bloco especial	Gaviões no Reino da Assombração Composers: Carioca, Dióceles Pereira and Moisés Pereira das Neves	Carnaval Commission	
1978	Champions	Bloco especial	Campeão dos Campeões Composers: Osvaldinho da Cuíca and Jangada	Carnaval Commission	
1979	Champions	Bloco especial	Folias da Vovó Composers: Osvaldo Arouche and Criolé	Carnaval Commission	
1980	Vice-champion	Bloco especial	Corinthians, turbilhão de Alegria Composers: Osvaldo Arouche and Valter Pinho	Carnaval Commission	
1981	Champions	Bloco especial	Folias de Momo Composers: Armando da Mangueira and Jangada	Carnaval Commission	
1982	Champions	Bloco especial	Folias de Zé Pereira Composers: Armando da Mangueira and Jangada	Carnaval Commission	
1983	Champions	Bloco especial	Fique Bem Comportado e Será Lembrado Composers: Armando da Mangueira and Osvaldo Arouche	Carnaval Commission	
1984	Champions	Bloco especial	Não Temos Tema Para Não Criar Problemas Composers: Armando da Mangueira and Osvaldo Arouche	Carnaval Commission	
1985	Champions	Bloco especial	Jubileu de Diamantes Composers: Armando da Mangueira and Osvaldo Arouche	Carnaval Commission	
1986	Champions	Bloco especial	Será Que Vem? Composers: Biro dos Gaviões and Toninho de Carvalho	Carnaval Commission	
1987	Champions	Bloco especial	Do Jeito Que Vier eu Traço Composers: José Rifai and Clay	Carnaval Commission	
1988	Champions	Bloco especial	Palhaços e Palhaçadas Composers: José Rifai and Bigu	Carnaval Commission	
1989	Vice-champion	Acesso	O Preto e Branco na Avenida Composers: Biro, Xavier, Frutuoso, Deolindo, and Baixinho Do Banjo	Carnaval Commission (Caio, Minoru, and Tina)	
1990	Ninth place	Especial	O Homem Nasceu Para Voar Composers: Pantera and Rogério PC	Carnaval Commission (Caio, Minoru, and Tina)	
1991	Champions	Acesso	A Dança das Horas Composer: Grego	Raul Diniz	
1992	Eighth place	Especial	Cidade Aquariana Composer: Grego	Raul Diniz	
1993	Sixth place	Especial	A Chave no Tempo Composer: Grego	Raul Diniz	
1994	Vice-champions	Especial	A Saliva do Santo e o Veneno da Serpente Composers: Grego and Magal	Raul Diniz	
1995	Champions	Especial	Coisa Boa é Para Sempre Composer: Grego	Raul Diniz	
1996	Fourth place	Especial	Quem Viver Verá o Vinte Virar Composers: Alemão do Cavaco, Luis Carlos Lopes, and Luis Eduardo Gomes	Raul Diniz	
1997	Fifth place	Especial	O Mundo da Rua Composer: Grego	Raul Diniz	
1998	Fifth place	Especial	Corinthians Meu Mundo é Você Composers: Alemão do Cavaco, José Rifai, and Ernesto Teixeira	Roberto Szaniecki	
1999	Champions	Especial	O Príncipe Encoberto ou a Busca de Dom Sebastião na Ilha de São Luís do Maranhão Composer: Grego	Roberto Szaniecki	
2000	Vice-champion	Especial	Um Voo Para a Liberdade Composers: Zé Rifai, Alemão do Cavaco, Ernesto Teixeira, and Armando da Mangueira	Jorge Freitas	
2001	Third place	Especial	Mitos e Magias na Triunfante Odisseia da Criação Composers: José Rifai, Alemão do Cavaco, and Ernesto Teixeira	Jorge Freitas	
2002	Champions	Especial	Xeque-Mate Composers: José Rifai e Alemão do Cavaco	Jorge Freitas	
2003	Champions	Especial	As Cinco Deusas Encantadas na Corte do Rei Gavião Composer: Grego	Jorge Freitas	
2004	Sixteenth place	Especial	Ideias e Paixões: Combustível das Revoluções Composers: Binho, and Claudinho	Roberto Szaniecki	
2005	Champions	Acesso	Renasce, sacode a poeira e dá a volta por cima Composers: José Rifai, Ernesto Teixeira, Alemão do Cavaco, and Grego	Jorge Freitas	
2006	Fifteenth place	Especial	Asas da Fascinação Composers: Ernesto Teixeira and Alemão do Cavaco	Jorge Freitas	
2007	Champions	Acesso	Anchieta, José do Brasil Composers: Binho and Claudinho	Jorge Freitas	
2008	Eleventh place	Especial	Nas asas dos Gaviões, rumo ao portal dos Sertões - Santana de Parnaíba, berço de Bandeirantes Composer: Fabinho Do Cavaco	Mauro Quintaes	
2009	Fourth place	Especial	O sonho comanda a vida, quando o homem sonha o mundo avança. A fantástica velocidade da roda para evolução humana. É pura adrenalina! Composers: Fabinho do Cavaco, João 10, Moraes, and Juninho Mascarenhas	Zilkson Reis	
2010	Fifth place	Especial	Corinthians... Minha vida, minha história, meu amor Composers: Luciano Costa, Fadico, Araken, Flávio Rocha, Gustavo Henrique, and Júnior Fionda	Zilkson Reis	
2011	Fifth place	Especial	Do Mar Das Pérolas e das Areias do Deserto à Cidade do Futuro - Dubai, O Sonho do Rei Maktoum Composers: Luciano Costa, Araken Fadico, Flávio Rocha, Tité, and Wellington Gonçalves	Zilkson Reis	
2012	Ninth place	Especial	Verás que o filho fiel não foge à luta. Lula o retrato de uma nação! Composers: Grandão, Batata, Netinho, Max, Dentinho, Luciano, Mariano Araújo, and Magrão R1	Carnaval Commission (Igor Carneiro, Delmo de Moraes, and Fábio Lima)	
2013	Ninth place	Especial	Ser Fiel é a alma do negócio Composers: José Rifai, Ernesto Teixeira, André União, Fadico, Murillo, Alex, and Bruno Muleki	Max Lopes	
2014	Tenth place	Especial	R9 – O Voo Real do Fenômeno Composers: José Rifai, Ernesto Teixeira, Grandão, Preto, Cainã, Sukata, Netinho da Carioca, and Max	Zilkson Reis	
2015	Ninth place	Especial	No jogo enigmático das cartas, desvendem os mistérios e façam suas apostas, pois a sorte está lançada! Composers: Danilo Garcia, Dom Álvaro, Eduardo Nery, Rodrigo Pezão, Tadeu Paulista, Gustavinho Oliveira, Caio Alves, and Rafael Tinguinha	Zilkson Reis	
2016	Seventh place	Especial	É Fantástico! Imagine, admire e sinta! Composers: Luciano Costa, Bruno Muleki, Alex, Nascimento, Fadico, Josemar Manfredini, Xico, and Júnior	Zilkson Reis	
2017	Ninth place	Especial	Com as mãos e a garra de um povo sonhador, surge o contraste de uma nova metrópole - Sampa, lugar de sonhos, opportunidades e esperança Composers: Moraes, Lubé LK, Renato do Pandeiro, Edmílson, Rogério, Maurição, Gledão, and Vini	Zilkson Reis	
2018	Seventh place	Especial	Guarus – Na aurora da criação, a profecia Tupi...Prosperidade e paz aos mensageiros de Rudá Composers: Luciano Costa, Bruno Muleki, Totonho, Alex, Fabio Palácio, Neto, Reinaldo Jr., and Fadico	Sidnei França	
2019	Ninth place	Especial	A Saliva do Santo e o Veneno da Serpente (New edition of Carnaval 1994) Composers: Grego and Magal.	Sidnei França	
2020	Eleventh place	Especial	Um não sei que, que nasce não sei onde, vem não sei como e explode não sei porquê... Composers: Rafael Falanga, Luciano Rosa, Biro-Biro, Portugal, and William Tadeu.	Paulo Barros and Paulo Menezes	
2021	Initially delayed to July, Carnaval 2021 was canceled due to the COVID-19 Pandemic.				
2022	Eighth place	Especial	Basta! Composers: Grandão, Sukata, Jairo Roizen, Morganti, Guinê, Xérem, Claudio Gladiador, Ribeirinho, Claudinho, Meiners, Luciano Costa, Felipe Yaw, Marcelo Adnet, Fadico, Júnior Fionda, Lequinho, Fábio Palácio, Leonel Querino, Altemir Magrão, Marcelo Valente, Sandro Lima, and Rodrigo Dias.	Zilkson Reis and Júlio Poloni	
2023	Ninth place	Especial	Em nome do Pai, dos Filhos, dos Espíritos e dos Santos... Amém! Composers: A. Filosofia, Araken, Armênio Poesia, Bruno Jaú, Fabinho do Cavaco, Maestro Jota Ilhabela, Nando do Cavaco, and Sebastian.	André Marins and Júlio Poloni	
2024	Fourth place	Especial	Vou Te Levar Pro Infinito Composers: Grandão, Sukata, Guga Pacheco, Claudio Mattos, Juliano Souza da Cuíca, and Japa Ovelha JB.	Júlio Poloni, Rayner Pereira, and Rodrigo Meiners	
2025	Third place	Especial	Irin Ajó Emi Ojisé - A Viagem do Espírito Mensageiro Composers: Grandão, Sukata, José Rifai, Ovelha JB, Juliano, Guga Pacheco, Gabriel Lima, Japa Mooca, Wesley, Morganti, Andrezinho, B. Cardoso, Gladzik, Renne Rocha, and Dentinho do Morro.	Júlio Poloni and Rayner Pereira	
2026	Vice-champion	Especial	Vozes Ancestrais para um Novo Amanhã Composers: Renato do Pandeiro, Rica Leite, Luciano Rosa, Cacá, Vini, Beto Cabeça, Don Souza, Portuga, Alves, Willian Tadeu, and Biro.	Júlio Poloni and Rayner Pereira	
2027		Especial	É Noite de Gira na Casa de Ogum	Júlio Poloni and Rayner Pereira	

== Awards ==
Note 10 Trophy
Year	Categories/Awards	References
2000	Allegorias	
2000	Samba-enredo ("Um Voo Para a Liberdade" - Composers: Zé Rifai, Alemão do Cavaco, Ernesto Teixeira, and Armando da Mangueira)	
2000	Enredo	
2001	Comissão de Frente	
2001	Allegorias	
2002	Ala das Baianas	
2002	Allegorias	
2003	Melhor Escola	
2003	Fantasia	
2003	Harmonia	
2003	Letra do Samba	
2003	Melodia	
2005 (Grupo de Acesso)	Allegorias	
2005 (Grupo de Acesso)	Ala das Baianas	
2005 (Grupo de Acesso)	Destaque de Luxo	
2005 (Grupo de Acesso)	Fantasias	
2007 (Grupo de Acesso)	Samba-enredo ("Anchieta, José do Brasil" - Composers: Binho and Claudinho)	
2012	Enredo	
2012	Bateria	
2013	Ala das Crianças	
2015	Bateria	
2015	Mestre-Sala and Porta-Bandeira	
2015	Comissão de Frente	
2015	Sambista Nota 10	
2020	Comissão de Frente	
2020	Velha Guarda	

=== Other awards ===
Year	Award	Category awarded	Ref.
2018	Estrela do Carnaval	Best Samba-enredo ("Guarus – Na aurora da criação, a profecia Tupi…Prosperidade e paz aos mensageiros de Rudá": Composers: Luciano Costa, Bruno Muleki, Totonho, Alex, Fabio Palácio, Neto, Reinaldo Jr., and Fadico.)	
2019	Estrela do Carnaval	Parade of the Year	
2019	Estrela do Carnaval	Best Samba-enredo ("A Saliva do Santo e o Veneno da Serpente" - Composers: Grego and Magal.)	
2019	Prêmio SASP Carnaval	Best Parade	
2019	Prêmio SASP Carnaval	Comissão de frente	
2019	Prêmio SASP Carnaval	Samba-enredo ("A Saliva do Santo e o Veneno da Serpente" - Composers: Grego and Magal.)	
2019	Prêmio SRzd Carnaval	Communication with the Public	
2019	Prêmio SRzd Carnaval	Comissão de frente	
2019	Prêmio SRzd Carnaval	Samba-enredo ("A Saliva do Santo e o Veneno da Serpente" - Composers: Grego and Magal.)	
2020	Estrela do Carnaval	Conjunto de Allegorias	
2020	Prêmio SASP Carnaval	Parade of the Year	
2020	Prêmio SASP Carnaval	Comissão de frente	
2020	Prêmio SASP Carnaval	Ala das Baianas	

== See also ==
- Brazilian Carnival
- São Paulo Carnaval
- Samba school
