= LigaSP =

Independent League of the Samba Schools of São Paulo

The Liga Independente das Escolas de Samba de São Paulo - Independent League of the Samba Schools of São Paulo - or LigaSP is an entity that administrates the Special and Access Groups of the Carnival of São Paulo.

In 1986 directors of the principal samba schools of São Paulo and a group of samba composers and dancers gathered in an assembly decided to create an association that would administrate the Paulista carnival.

Nowadays the LigaSP manages the parades, repassing the lucres to the samba schools of the Special and Access Groups, creating a group of sporting samba schools. In 2018, changes take control of all the groups in Anhembi, with the inclusion of Group 1, until then UESP so we have the Access Groups 1 and 2.

== Presidents ==
1986	Eduardo Basílio
1986-1987	Walter Guariglio
1987-1989	Juarez da Cruz
1989-1991	Leandro Alves Martins
1991-1992	Júlio Teixeira
1992-1993	Horácio Bailão de Mello
1993-1995	Sólon Tadeu Pereira
1995-1997	Laurentino Borges Marques
1997-1998	Eumar Meireles Barbosa
1998-1999	Robson de Oliveira
1999-2000	Sidnei Carrioulo Antônio
2000-2005	Robson de Oliveira
2005-2007	Alexandre Marcelino Ferreira
2007-2009	Sidnei Carrioulo Antônio
2009-2020	Paulo Sérgio Ferreira
2020-	Sidnei Carrioulo Antônio

== Grupo Especial ==
Friday

- Acadêmicos do Tucuruvi
- Colorado do Brás
- Mancha Verde
- Tom Maior
- Unidos de Vila Maria
- Acadêmicos do Tatuapé
- Dragões da Real

Saturday

- Vai-Vai
- Gaviões da Fiel
- Mocidade Alegre
- Águia de Ouro
- Barroca Zona Sul
- Rosas de Ouro
- Império de Casa Verde

== Grupo 1 ==
Sunday

- Morro da Casa Verde
- Camisa Verde e Branco
- Mocidade Unida da Mooca
- Independente Tricolor
- Estrela do Terceiro Milênio
- X-9 Paulistana
- Leandro de Itaquera
- Pérola Negra

== Grupo 2 ==
Monday

- Brinco da Marquesa
- Camisa 12
- Uirapuru da Mooca
- Primeira da Cidade Líder
- Unidos de Santa Bárbara
- Torcida Jovem
- Nenê de Vila Matilde
- Unidos do Peruche
- Imperador do Ipiranga
- Amizade Zona Leste
- Tradição Albertinense
- Dom Bosco

== First Division Champions ==
- 1950 - Lavapés (1)
- 1951 - Lavapés (2)
- 1952 - Lavapés (3)
- 1953 - Lavapés (4)
- 1954 - Brasil de Santos (1)
- 1955 - Garotos do Itaim (1)
- 1956 - Nenê de Vila Matilde (1)
- 1956 - Lavapés (5)
- 1956 - Garotos do Itaim (2)
- 1957 - Unidos do Peruche (1)
- 1958 - Nenê de Vila Matilde (2)
- 1959 - Nenê de Vila Matilde (3)
- 1960 - Nenê de Vila Matilde (4)
- 1961 - Lavapés (6)
- 1962 - Unidos do Peruche (2)
- 1963 - Nenê de Vila Matilde (5)
- 1964 - Lavapés (7)
- 1965 - Nenê de Vila Matilde (6)
- 1965 - Unidos do Peruche (3)
- 1966 - Unidos do Peruche (4)
- 1967 - Unidos do Peruche (5)
- 1968 - Nenê de Vila Matilde (7)
- 1969 - Nenê de Vila Matilde (8)
- 1970 - Nenê de Vila Matilde (9)
- 1971 - Mocidade Alegre (1)
- 1972 - Mocidade Alegre (2)
- 1973 - Mocidade Alegre (3)
- 1974 - Camisa Verde e Branco (1)
- 1975 - Camisa Verde e Branco (2)
- 1976 - Camisa Verde e Branco (3)
- 1977 - Camisa Verde e Branco (4)
- 1978 - Vai-Vai (1)
- 1979 - Camisa Verde e Branco (5)
- 1980 - Mocidade Alegre (4)
- 1981 - Vai-Vai (2)
- 1982 - Vai-Vai (3)
- 1983 - Rosas de Ouro (1)
- 1984 - Rosas de Ouro (2)
- 1985 - Nenê de Vila Matilde (10)
- 1986 - Vai-Vai (5)
- 1987 - Vai-Vai (6)
- 1989 - Camisa Verde e Branco (6)
- 1990 - Camisa Verde e Branco (7)
- 1990 - Rosas de Ouro (2)
- 1990 - Camisa Verde e Branco (7)
- 1990 - Rosas de Ouro (3)
- 1991 - Camisa Verde e Branco (8)
- 1991 - Rosas de Ouro (4)
- 1992 - Rosas de Ouro (5)
- 1993 - Camisa Verde e Branco (9)
- 1993 - Vai-Vai (7)
- 1994 - Rosas de Ouro (6)
- 1995 - Gaviões da Fiel (1)
- 1996 - Vai-Vai (8)
- 1997 - X-9 Paulistana (1)
- 1998 - Vai-Vai (9)
- 1999 - Gaviões da Fiel (2)
- 1999 - Vai-Vai (10)
- 2000 - Vai-Vai (11)
- 2000 - X-9 Paulistana (2)
- 2001 - Vai-Vai (12)
- 2001 - Nenê de Vila Matilde (11)
- 2002 - Gaviões da Fiel (3)
- 2003 - Gaviões da Fiel (4)
- 2004 - Mocidade Alegre (5)
- 2005 - Império de Casa Verde (1)
- 2006 - Império de Casa Verde (2)
- 2007 - Mocidade Alegre (6)
- 2008 - Vai-Vai (13)
- 2009 - Mocidade Alegre (7)
- 2010 - Rosas de Ouro (7)
- 2011 - Vai-Vai (14)
- 2012 - Mocidade Alegre (8)
- 2013 - Mocidade Alegre (9)
- 2014 - Mocidade Alegre (10)
- 2015 - Vai-Vai (15)
- 2016 - Império de Casa Verde (3)
- 2017 - Acadêmicos do Tatuapé (1)
- 2018 - Acadêmicos do Tatuapé (2)
- 2019 - Mancha Verde (1)
- 2020 - Águia de Ouro (1)

== See also ==
- Anhembi Sambadrome
- Torcida Jovem of Santos FC School of Samba
