= Anhembi Sambadrome =

Sambadrome in São Paulo, Brazil

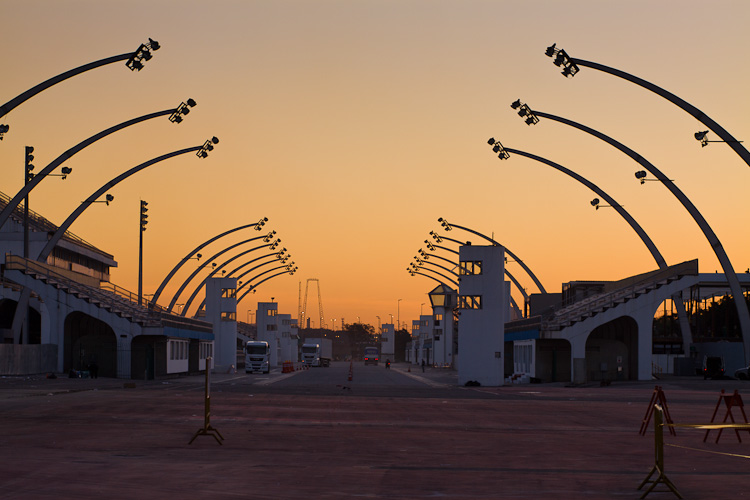
- Anhembi Sambadrome
- Interactive map of Anhembi Sambadrome
- Coordinates: 23°30′59″S 46°38′47″W
- Capacity: 103,200 people

Construction
- Opened: 1991
- Architect: Oscar Niemeyer

Website
- www.anhembi.com.br

The Polo Cultural e Esportivo Grande Otelo, commonly known as Anhembi Sambadrome, is a Sambadrome and one of the largest outdoor venues for major events in the city of São Paulo in Brazil. It opened in 1991, and has a capacity of 103,200 people. It hosts around 30 events per year, including the São Paulo carnival, Independence Day celebrations, and music events.

== Location ==
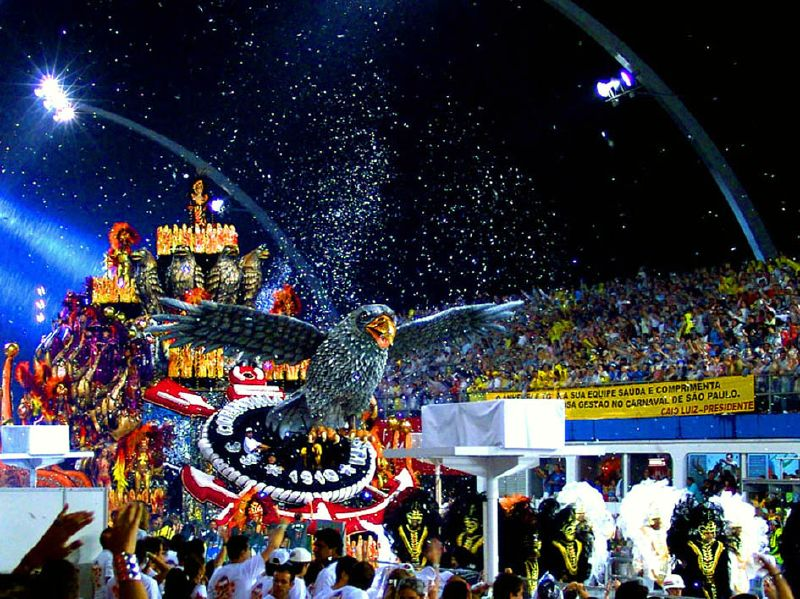
Gaviões da Fiel at the Carnival of São Paulo.

The Sambadrome is one of the largest outdoor venues for major events in the city of São Paulo in Brazil. It is managed by São Paulo Turismo. It is part of the Anhembi Convention Center, at 1.209 Avenida Olavo Fontoura in Santana, near to the Portuguesa–Tietê metro station.

== Design ==
It was designed by architect Oscar Niemeyer. It opened in 1991, with an initial capacity of 10,000 people. In 1992 it doubled capacity to 20,000 people with the opening of new grandstands. On 12 February 1996 the full stadium was completed, with a total capacity of 30,000 people, of which 26,246 can be seated. Today's capacity on the website of the Anhembi Sambadrome is mentioned as 103,200 people (2019). There are nine stands in total, with Arquibancada Monumental (stand B) having a capacity of 7,749 people, six other stands holding 1,760 people, and two others (stands D and G) holding 1,447 people. It also has 103 individual rooms with capacities between 10 and 50 people.

The Sambadrome is 530 metres (1,740 ft) long and 14 metres (46 ft) wide, and it has a structural, flood-proof concrete floor. The water polo holds 40,000 litres of water, and has 750 kW of track lighting.

== Events ==
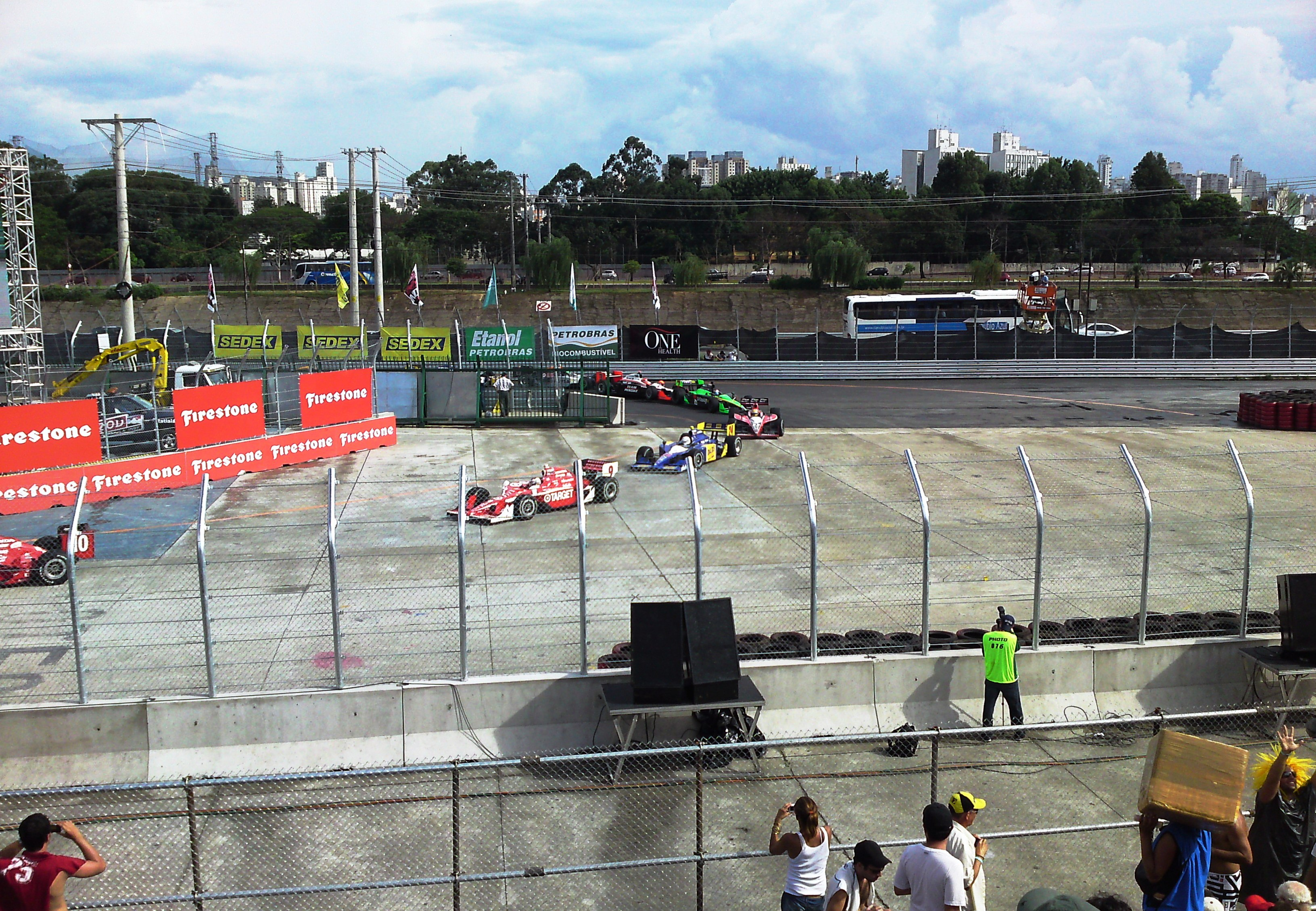
2010 São Paulo Indy 300.

The venue hosts around 30 events per year, including the samba schools of the São Paulo carnival (for which it was originally designed), as well as musical performances and concerts, and the Independence Day celebrations (since 1998). It also hosts sporting events and classic car fairs.

From 2010 to 2013 the Sambadrome was used as part of the São Paulo Indy 300 IndyCar Series race, and from 2023 it will form part of the São Paulo ePrix Formula E course.

== See also ==
- Torcida Jovem
- Liga Independente das Escolas de Samba de São Paulo
