= Vai-Vai =

Brazilian samba school from São Paulo

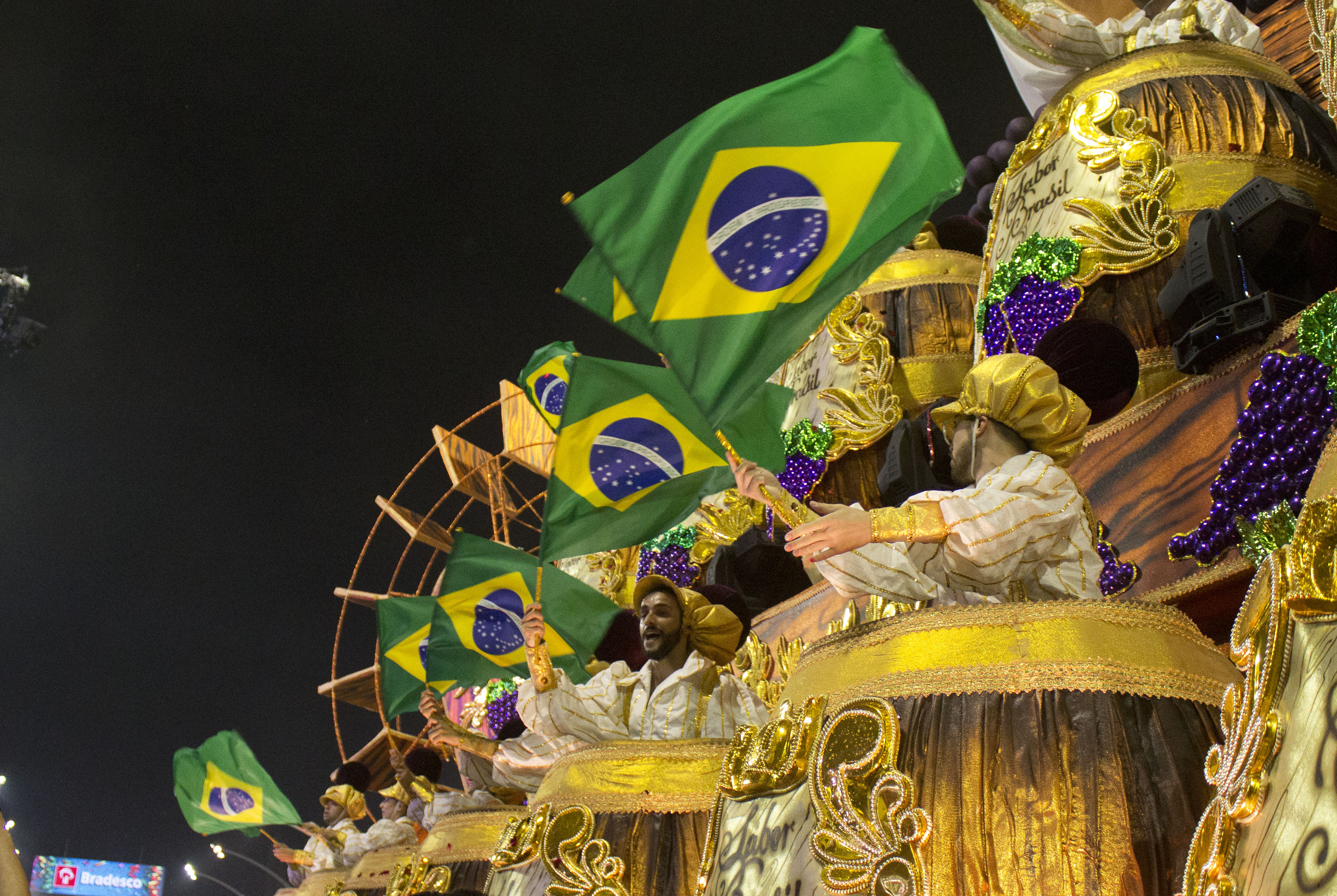
- Foundation: 1 January 1930; 96 years ago
- Colors: Black and White
- Symbol: Crown with a coffee branch below
- President: Paulo Mello
- Honorary president: Thobias da Vai-Vai

Website
- vaivai.com.br

The Grêmio Recreativo Cultural e Social Escola de Samba Vai-Vai (Recreational, Cultural and Social Guild Samba School Vai-Vai) is a samba school from the city of São Paulo, founded by a group of notable samba musicians in the Bixiga neighborhood, within the Bela Vista district. It calls itself the "People's School". It is one of the largest associations of Brazilian Carnival and the greatest champion of the São Paulo Carnival with 15 titles (1978, 1981, 1982, 1986, 1987, 1988, 1993, 1996, 1998, 1999, 2000, 2001, 2008, 2011 and 2015), in addition to 10 runner-up finishes (1972, 1974, 1976, 1977, 1983, 1985, 1992, 1997, 2006 and 2009).

== History ==
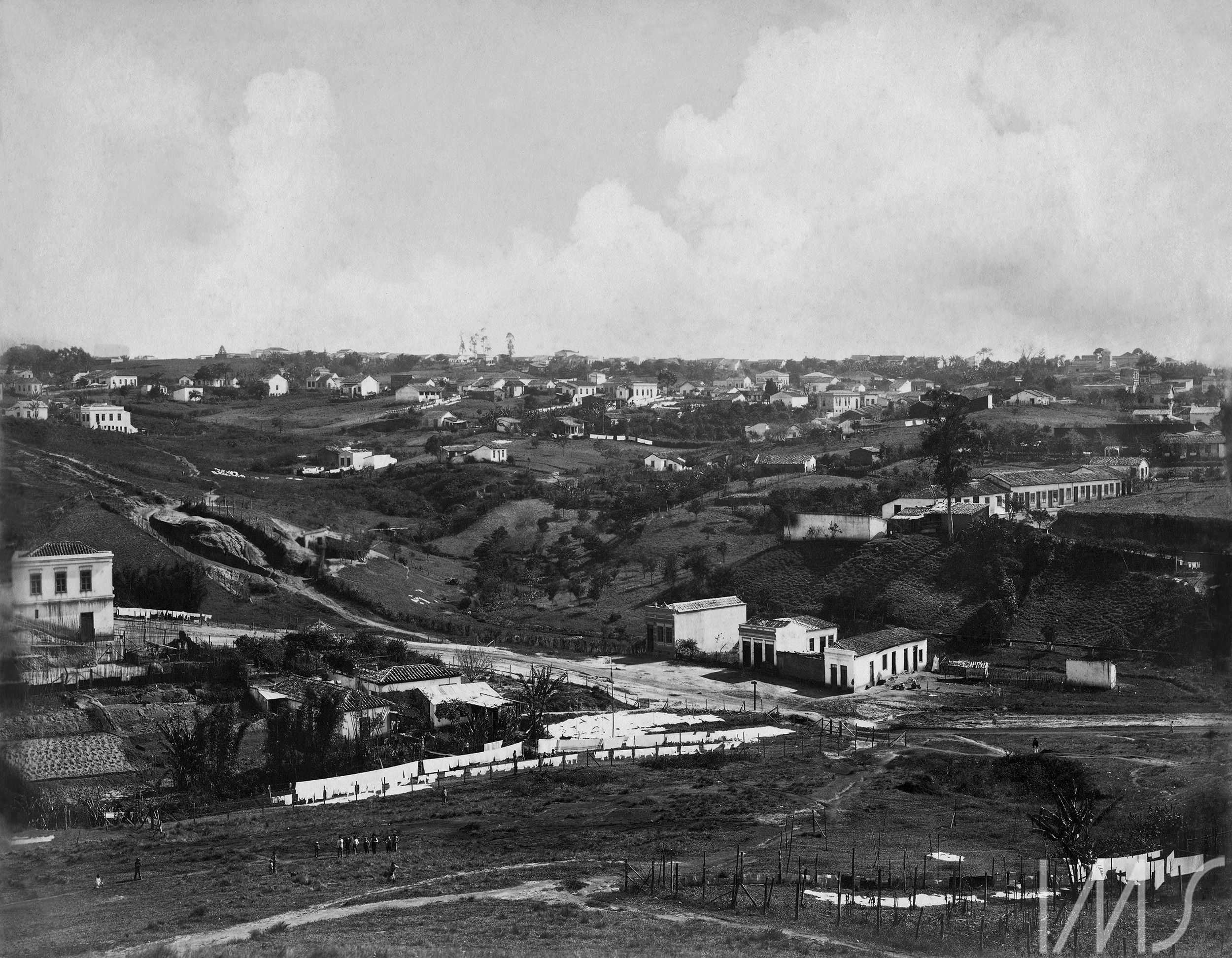
Saracura Valley, region of the current Praça 14 Bis. Photograph by Vincenzo Pastore, circa 1900.

In the early 20th century, in the Bixiga neighborhood on Marques Leão Street, there was a soccer team called Cai-Cai, which used black and white colors, part of which was a choro group and played on the Lusitana field, near the intersection of Rocha and Una streets, in the Saracura River region.

Around 1928, a group of friends led by Livinho and Benedito Sardinha, among them Henrique Felipe da Costa (Henricão), Frederico Penteado (Fredericão), Lourival de Almeida (Seo Loro), helped liven up the games and parties held by Cai-Cai, but were always seen as intruders and troublemakers, being jokingly nicknamed "the Vae-Vae gang". Expelled from Cai-Cai, they created the "Bloco dos Esfarrapados" (Ragged Ones Block), and in parallel, the Carnaval Cordão and Sports Vae-Vae, which was officially established in 1930.

Vae-Vae adopted the colors black and white, the colors of Cai-Cai inverted, as a way of mocking the cordão they had separated from. Its first banner was made of black satin adorned with white fringes, having as its central symbol a drawing of a Crown with two coffee branches and below the branches, the name of the cordão, followed by the foundation date.

Its first composer was Henrique Filipe da Costa, Henricão, who composed the 1928 samba: "Quem vive aborrecido distrai no Bloco Carnavalesco Vai Vai" (Those who live bored get distracted in the Vai Vai Carnival Block). Also his authorship was the 1929 samba, which said "O Vai Vai na rua faz tremer a Terra / Quem está ouvindo e não vê / Chega a pensar que é guerra" (Vai Vai on the street makes the Earth tremble / Those who hear and don't see / Come to think it's war). In the 1980s, Henricão would become the first black King Momo of the São Paulo carnival.

Fredericão was the mentor of Vae-Vae's coat of arms, consisting of a crown based on two coffee branches. The first official parade of the Vai Vai cordão took place in February 1930. Its theme was São Paulo and the samba was again composed by Henricão: "Salve São Paulo, tens o céu cor de anil/ Possui a riqueza e a grandeza, és o coração do Brasil" (Hail São Paulo, you have an indigo sky / You possess wealth and greatness, you are the heart of Brazil). The costumes were free, and black and white predominated. The first songs performed by the association in its parades were composed by the trio Tino, Guariba and Henricão.

In the second parade, in 1931, a samba exalting the cordão itself was sung. The year 1932, due to the Constitutionalist Revolution, was the only one in which the Cordão did not parade. In 1933, Vai-Vai returned with a theme honoring the Brazilian Navy, with all the dancers dressed as sailors.

In 1934, the then GC Vae-Vae won the second edition of the contest held by the Frente Negra Brasileira (Brazilian Black Front), parading with more than 100 members on Carnival Tuesday.

Vai-Vai started competing in official parades in 1935, competing against 34 other associations, 15 of them cordões, all in a single contest. From 1935 to 1965 Vai-Vai did not have a samba-enredo, but exaltation sambas, which were sung during the parade and always composed by Tino and Gurariba. From 1951 onwards, after being a drummer and whistle-blower (when he made the drum beat of Vai-Vai similar to that of Mangueira), Sebastião Eduardo do Amaral, the famous Pé Rachado, became the first official president of the cordão, a position he held officially until 1973. In the mid-1960s, a fight between Pé Rachado and Romulo, son of Dona Iracema, caused a dissidence in Bela Vista: the cordão Fio de Ouro. Besides Fio de Ouro, São Geraldo, from the Penteado family, and Geraldino appeared. The only branch that still survives is Barroca Zona Sul.

Djalma Branco, together with Carioca, elaborated great themes in the 1960s, such as "The second marriage of Dom Pedro I", in 1966. Due to lack of funds, in 1967, the cordão repeated the theme and won the title, which caused great confusion among the competitors. In 1968 the theme was: "The arrival of the royal family", where Vai-Vai had as its costume designer the highest ranking in haute couture of the time, the stylist Denner. His arrival revolutionized the world of São Paulo samba. Still as themes, Vai-Vai had, in 1969, "Aleijadinho", in 1970, "Princess Leopoldina" – the entity's last title as a carnival cordão – and, in 1971, "Independence or Death", with Zé Di being the composer of the last samba of the cordão era, who later became famous in Acadêmicos do Salgueiro.

In the early 1970s, the category of carnival cordões was already decadent, and all started to transform into samba schools. In 1972, Vai-Vai officially became a samba school, with the name Grêmio Recreativo Cultural e Escola de Samba Vai-Vai, debuting in the Special Group. After Pé Rachado's departure, Chiclé took over the presidency. The first title as a samba school came in 1978, six years after the change. Other titles were won in 1981, 1982, 1986, 1987 and 1988.

In the late 1990s and early 2000s, the school lived its best phase, when, after winning the title in 1996, it was four-time consecutive champion between 1998 and 2001, although the last three titles were shared with other schools.

On the eve of the 1999 parade, the Confederação Israelita do Brasil (Israelite Confederation of Brazil), the Israelite Federation of the State of São Paulo and B'nai B'rith of Brazil protested against one of Vai-Vai's wings, whose costumes featured accessories with the swastika design, with the intention of representing the supposed prediction made by Nostradamus, the title character of that year's theme, about the rise of Nazism, in which the Jewish entities recognized a possible apology to Adolf Hitler's party. Sólon Tadeu, the school's president at the time, apologized to the representatives of the three entities, arguing that the school only wanted to represent Nostradamus's prediction and had no intention of causing offense. Even so, Tadeu determined that Vai-Vai would parade with the controversial accessory covered by black tarpaulins, to avoid negative interpretations.

The following year, celebrating its 70th anniversary in a carnival where all schools presented themes related to the 500 years of the Discovery of Brazil, Vai-Vai presented the theme "Vai-Vai Brazil", dealing with the period from 1985 to 2000. That year, it obtained its 11th title with carnival designer Flávio Tavares.

In 2001 the school was four-time champion with the theme "The Path of Light, Universal Peace".

In 2002 the school was the fifth to parade on the second night of parades with the theme "Locked with Seven Keys", which showed legends and superstitions about the number 7. The following year, in 2003, it was the sixth school to parade on Friday with the theme "Among Marches, Gallops and Rides". On both occasions, the school finished in 5th place.

In 2004, a thematic Carnival for the 450th anniversary of the city of São Paulo, the association honored the Bixiga neighborhood and, after some problems in the evolution of the parade, obtained the third worst result in its history: 11th place.

The following year, in 2005, as the third school to parade on Friday, with the theme "I Am Also Immortal", the school came "bitten" but finished in fifth place. That year, the drum section protested against some of the scores and decided not to attend the champions' parade. After that, the president decided that the school would not participate in the parade.

In 2006, it came closer to the title with the theme "São Vicente, here began Brazil", but lost by half a point to Império de Casa Verde.

In 2007, already under the command of Tobias and with Vaguinho as singer, Vai-Vai finished in third place. The new president, right after the parade, did not polemicize about the result, recognizing the victory of Mocidade Alegre, although he said he would like to see the justifications for some of the theme category scores.

After Carnival, the school was prevented from continuing its rehearsals on the streets of Bixiga, as it had done until then for not having a sufficiently large headquarters to host them. This happened because a group of residents, who for years had protested against the inconveniences brought by the rehearsals, managed to get the city hall to forbid the association from rehearsing on the street. Permission would be obtained again a few years later.

In 2008, after seven years without winning, Vai-Vai paraded with the theme "Wake up Brazil, the way out is to have hope", about education through music in Brazil, and won its 13th title.

In 2009, the school bet on a parade that was more technical than exciting, with the theme "Mens sana et corpore sano – The millennium of overcoming", in which it addressed the history of health. The front commission "In search of the Vitruvian man" represented a duel between good and evil; the opening float, "Black Death", represented smallpox; the Baianas wing symbolized "Microbial Globalization"; and the drum section, coming from "Black Death" and "Wolf-Man of Man", represented the unhealthy conditions of the 14th century. The school finished in 2nd place, half a point less than the champion Mocidade Alegre.

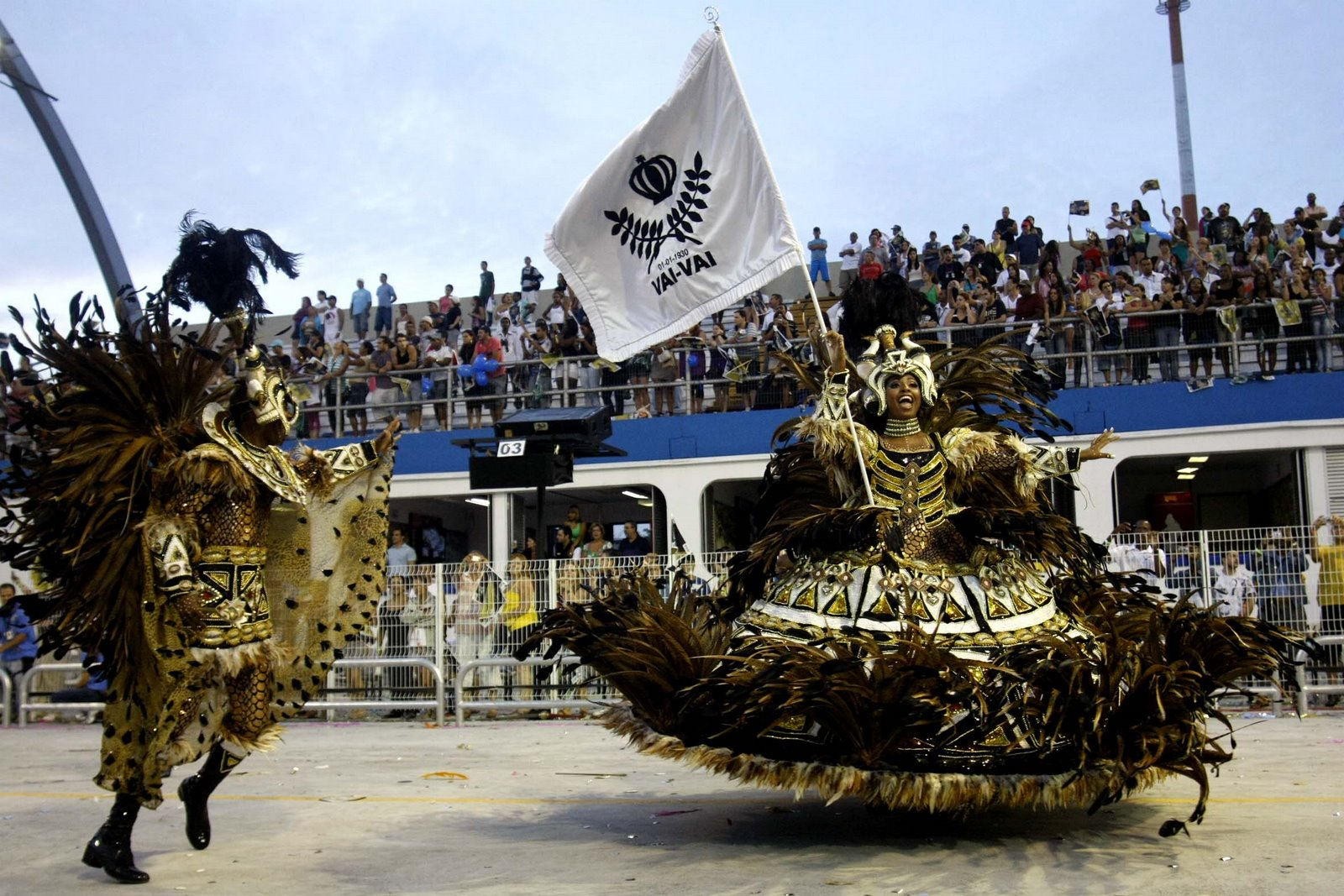
Mestre-sala and Porta-bandeira of the school, in 2010.

In 2010, without Chico Spinosa, but endowed with a Carnival Commission, Vai-Vai presented a theme that addressed the 80 years of the FIFA World Cup, making a parallel with the eighty years of the school itself. Due to the scores obtained in the Evolution and Front Commission categories, the school finished in 3rd place, three-quarters of a point less than the champion Rosas de Ouro.

On 20 April 2010, the president of Vai-Vai, Thobias da Vai-Vai, ceded the presidency to Darli Silva, Neguitão, and was named honorary president of the association.

In 2011, Vai-Vai bet on a parade considered exciting, with the theme "Music Won", a theme that took to the sambadrome the life and work of the maestro, pianist and conductor João Carlos Martins. The front commission, "Delirium of Dalí", presented a synthesis of his biography, where the 16 members were dressed as characters from music, politics and football, as women and as representatives of other moments of his life. The opening float symbolized the "Divine Procession – The Gods of Inspiration", the first couple represented Orpheus and Eurydice, the baianas represented "Pythonissis – The Prediction of the Future", and the drum section paraded with the costume "Our Samba Orchestra". The school finished as the champion of the São Paulo carnival, this being its 14th title.

For 2012 it presented a theme exalting women in general. It honored women such as Elis Regina, Empress Leopoldina, Anita Garibaldi and Clarice Lispector, as well as the mythical Eve. The front commission, Cor de Rosa Choque (Shock Pink), which alluded to the homonymous song by Rita Lee, came with Adriana Lessa at the front and showed various female personalities: Mothers, Maids, Superheroines, Slaves, among others. With well-finished cars and costumes superior to the previous year, the school excited the Anhembi audience, but had several problems, with an entire wing missing its head accessory. Carnival designer Alexandre Louzada, who in the same year also signed the theme for Mocidade Independente de Padre Miguel, declared that the school had flaws and that much of what he created for the theme did not go to the runway. Vai-Vai finished in 3rd place.

In 2013, the school hired Cahê Rodrigues and brought the theme "Blood of the earth, vine of life: A toast of love in the middle of the avenue – wines of Brazil" about wine, sponsored by wine producers from Brazil. The school ended in 7th place.

In 2014, the return of carnival designer Chico Spinoza and singer Thobias da Vai-Vai was announced, who initially would form a duo with Bruno Ribas, who was fired and eventually replaced by young Márcio Alexandre. The theme addressed the fiftieth anniversary of the city of Paulínia. Although the school was praised for being able to develop the history of the inland city on the avenue, Vai-Vai received much lower scores than expected. It ended in ninth place, its worst placement since the 2004 carnival. Right after the weak parade, new elections for the school's board were called. Neguitão was re-elected president on a joint ticket, which had Thobias da Vai-Vai as vice-president, Caio de Souza Santos as financial director and Fátima Acre as secretary director. The association also hired Alexandre Louzada as carnival designer for the 2015 Carnival.

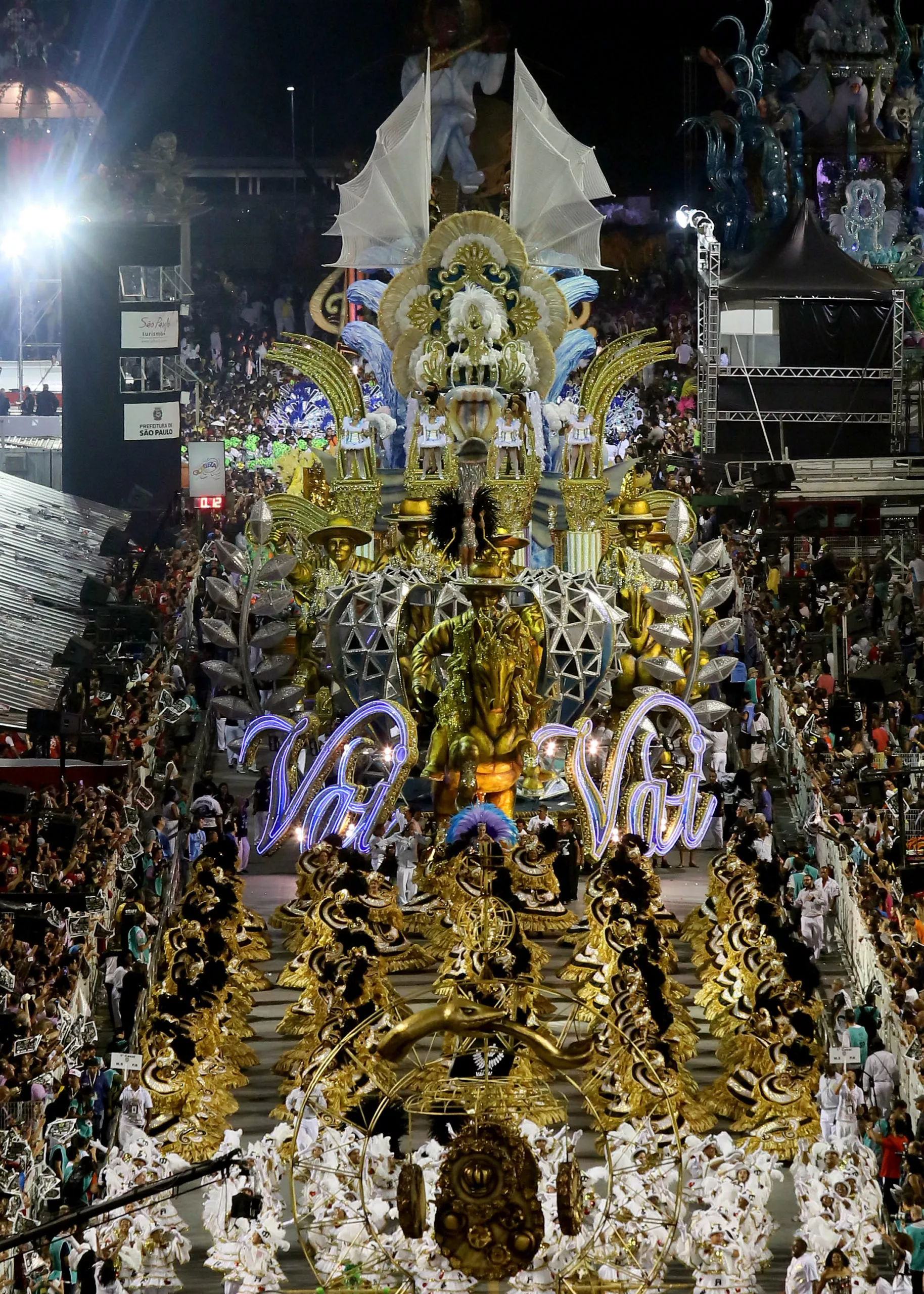
Opening float of Vai-Vai, in the champion parade of 2015.

In 2015, Vai-Vai paid homage to one of the great singers of MPB, Elis Regina. Penultimate school of the second day of parades of the Special Group, the school performed a parade of perfect harmony and evolution and generated strong reactions in the stands, with a samba-enredo containing parts of the songs of "Pimentinha", and finishing the route shouting "It's champion!". Effectively, the school won its 15th title that year.

In 2016, Vai-Vai paraded with a theme about France, developed by carnival designers Renato and Márcia Lage, who also signed the carnival of Acadêmicos do Salgueiro, from Rio de Janeiro. Although there was great expectation about the parade, the school, unlike the previous year, had problems in the Samba-Enredo, Evolution and Drum sections, finishing in fourth place in the overall classification.

In 2017, the school brought the theme "In the Xirê of Anhembi, the most beautiful Oxum appeared... Menininha, mother of Bahia – Ialorixá of Brazil" signed by carnival designers Alexandre Louzada, André Marins and Júnior Schall, which told the story of Mãe Menininha do Gantois and her relationship with orixás of African religions. The association made a grandiose parade, but it was marked by a delay that caused the school to speed up to finish its parade within the regulated time. It lost essential points in the Costume and Allegories & Accessories categories and received third place.

In 2018, the school honored singer and composer Gilberto Gil. Through the theme "Sambar com Fé eu vou" (I'll samba with faith), it told the life and career of the artist, in addition to recalling Gilberto Gil's compositions. It reinforced the sound car by hiring experienced Wantuir and singer Grazzi Brasil, a revelation of the São Paulo carnival in 2017. In September, Wantuir broke the contract with Vai-Vai, leaving Grazzi as official singer, accompanied by singer Belo and Gilsinho. The school involved the Anhembi audience with a powerful samba-enredo, made a luxurious parade, again signed by Alexandre Louzada, with the collaboration of Chico Spinoza, Júnior Schall, Delmo de Moraes and Fernando Barata, but lost points in the evolution, costume, front commission and allegories & accessories categories. It thus finished in tenth place.

In 2019, the Bixiga association took to the Sambadrome the theme: "Vai-Vai: the quilombo of the future", discussing the suffering, resistance and empowerment of black people with a utopian perspective of reclaiming technological domination throughout history. The theme was signed by carnival designers Roberto Monteiros and Hernani Siqueira. The school was the fourth to parade on Carnival Saturday. Vai-Vai finished in fourteenth place, and was automatically relegated to the Access Group for the first time in 89 years of history. This placement led to the removal of the then president Darly Silva (Neguitão) and the creation and convening of a Steering Council, led by Pedro Henrique da Silva (Pedrinho da Vai-Vai), member of the Composers' Wing / Marketing Director at the time, and Clarício Gonçálves. Pedrinho left the position in the same year, citing in an official statement difficulties in conducting work related to political disagreements.

In 2020, after a pre-carnival troubled by internal fights and the appalling result of the 2019 carnival, the school entered the avenue, closing the parades of the access group 1, and was crowned champion, winning its first title in the second division of the São Paulo Carnival and the right to return to the special group in 2021. The school took to the avenue the theme "Vai-Vai: de corpo e Álamo" (Vai-Vai: body and Álamo), about its 90 years of foundation (Álamo wedding). The theme was developed by carnival designer Chico Spinoza, with whom the school had already won the titles of 1998, 1999 and 2008, in addition to the runner-up in 1997 and 2009, third place in 2007 and ninth position in 2014, when it honored the fiftieth anniversary of the city of Paulínia.

After the COVID-19 pandemic postponed the 2021 parades, Vai-Vai took to the Anhembi Sambadrome in 2022 a theme honoring Sankofa, one of the best-known Adinkras, represented by a bird with its feet firmly on the ground and its head turned backward, holding an egg in its beak. The egg symbolizes the past, demonstrating that the bird flies forward, to the future, without forgetting the past. It emerged with the Ghanaian proverb "Se wo were fi na wosankofa a yenkyi" meaning "it is not taboo to go back and recover what you forgot (lost)". Through a genuine Sankofa movement – the ability to look to the past to build the future – the Brazilian black movement began to seek affirmative action policies for the black population, as a strategy to interrupt a historical process of racial marginalization and guarantee a future with dignity for the black population, which necessarily involves full access to prestigious spaces in society.

After a pre-carnival marked by difficulties in finding a space to serve as a workshop for making floats and costumes, the loss of its historic court on São Vicente Street due to the construction works of metro line 6 orange, the school entered the samba runway, opening the second night of parades of the special group. Even taking to the avenue one of the best themes of the 2022 carnival, along with one of the most praised sambas of the season, the school could not repeat the success of the previous carnival, and suffered a 14th place, with 269.1 points, thus returning to the Access Group 1 for the 2023 carnival.

Aiming at the 2023 carnival, the second in the Access Group 1, the school announced the departure of Pingo and Paulinha from the post of first mestre-sala and porta-bandeira couple, which they had held for 16 years, and hired Renatinho and Fabíola, who had defended the association for eight carnivals between the late 1990s and early 2000s. Subsequently, the re-edition of "Eu Também Sou Imortal" (I Am Also Immortal), the theme that Vai-Vai originally presented in 2005, was announced.

The parade was considered by most to be one of the greatest in the history of the access group, and the Bixiga school presented impeccable aesthetics, combined with technically perfect harmony. What was seen at Anhembi was one of the biggest "sacodes" (overwhelming victories) in the history of the sambadrome.

In the tally, Vai-Vai received only one score different from 10; a 9.9 in the Drum section, which was discarded. It reached the maximum score of 270 points, was crowned champion of Access 1 in 2023 and will return to the Special Group of São Paulo in 2024. On 27 February, the officialization of Sidnei França as the school's carnival designer was announced. The artist, who indirectly had been part of the commission that carried out the historic 2023 parade, had already been champion of the São Paulo elite four other times with co-sisters Mocidade Alegre and Águia de Ouro.

Vai-Vai's parade at the 2024 Carnival was marked by a tribute to 40 years of Hip Hop culture in Brazil. The theme, entitled "Chapter 4, Verse 3 – From the Street and the People, Hip Hop: A Paulistano Manifesto", celebrated the influence of the hip-hop movement and used the popular language of MCs and DJs through rap. Carnival designer Sidnei França signed the theme.Sindicato dos Delegados de SP repudia desfile da Vai-Vai por 'demonizar a polícia'; escola afirma retratar acontecimentos históricos

== Segments ==
=== Presidents ===
Name	Term	Ref.
Seu Livinho	1930–1951	
Pé Rachado	1951–1972	
Seu Chiclé	1972–1992	
Paulo Fernandes de Mello "Seu Mello"	1992–1996	
Sólon Tadeu Pereira	1996–2007	
Thobias da Vai-Vai	2007–2010	
Darly Silva "Neguitão"	2010–2019	
Dra. Anna Maria Murari Gilbert Finestres	2019–2021	
Clarício Gonçalves	2021–2026	
Paulo Mello	2026 –	

=== Honorary President ===
Name	Term
Thobias da Vai-Vai	2010– current

=== Singers ===
Carnivals	Official singer	Ref.
1976 -1977	Sol and Odair	
1978	Carlão	
1979 -1980	Almir Guineto	
1981	Denilson	
1982	Aldo Bueno	
1983 -1984	Chuveiro	
1985	Sol	
1986 -1993	Thobias da Vai-Vai	
1994	Agnaldo Amaral	
1995 -1998	Thobias da Vai-Vai	
1999	Thobias da Vai-Vai, Wantuir and Agnaldo Amaral	
2000	Thobias da Vai-Vai and Agnaldo Amaral	
2001	Gilsinho	
2002	Benson and Gilsinho	
2003	René Sobral	
2004–2006	Agnaldo Amaral	
2007	Vaguinho	
2008–2009	Carlos Júnior	
2010	Gilsinho	
2011–2013	Wander Pires	
2014	Márcio Alexandre	
2015	Márcio Alexandre and Gilsinho	
2016–2017	Wander Pires	
2018	Grazzi Brasil and Gilsinho	
2019	Grazzi Brasil	
2020	Luiz Felipe and Washington	
2022–present	Luiz Felipe	

=== Choreographers ===
Period	Name	Ref.
2013	Jarbas Homem de Mello	
2014–2015	Jhean Allex	
2016	Steven Harper and Adriana Salomão	
2017	Roberta Melo	
2018	Thiago Chodrawí	
2019	Chris Brasil	
2020–2022	Irineu Nogueira	
2023–2024	Robson Bernardino	
2025	Sérgio Cardoso	
2026	Priscila Paciência and Diogo Santos	

=== Directors ===
Year	Carnival Director	General Harmony Director	Drum Master	Ref
2014	Lourival Almeida and Janaina Decarli	Fernando Penteado	Tadeu	
2015–2016	Janaína Decarli	Fernando Penteado and Wagner Amancio	Tadeu and Beto	
2017	Janaína Decarli	Edison "Buiu", Fernando Penteado, Caique, Lourival and Wagner Amâncio	Tadeu and Beto	
2018	Janaína Decarli	Fernando Penteado/Lourival/Vela/Buiu and Caique	Tadeu and Beto	
2019	Lourival and Marcelo Casa Nossa	Edison Buiu	Tadeu and Beto	
2020	Carnival Commission	Edison Buiu	Tadeu and Beto	
2022	Gabriel Mello	Edison Buiu	Tadeu and Beto	
2023	Carnival Commission	Edison Buiu	Tadeu and Beto	
2024	Carnival Commission	Luiz Robles and Paulo Mello	Tadeu and Beto	

=== Mestre-sala and Porta-bandeira Couple ===
Period	Name	Ref.
1972	Ivonete and Ivo	
1980	Urco and Ana Amélia	
1988–1989	Sergio Neris and Cleusa Rossi	
1990	Urco and Cleusa	
1991–1993	Élcio and Eneidir	
1994–1997	Paulinho and Eneidir	
1998–2005	Renatinho and Fabíola	
2006–2022	Pingo and Paulinha Penteado	
2023–2025	Renatinho and Fabíola	
2026	Pedro Trindade and Mirelly Nunes	

=== History of the Drum Section ===
It didn't take long for the Cordão Vai Vai to become respected by everyone; its drum section had an unmistakable beat, with its surdos that were played with two drumsticks and zabumbas. At its head came Livinho, the first whistler, master of the drum section and of the cordão until the mid-1940s. Among the notable names of this drum section is Sebastião Eduardo do Amaral, better known as Pé Rachado, who, after Livinho's departure, became president of the cordão. Pé Rachado commanded Vai-Vai's drum section for three years, before passing command to Wálter Gomes de Oliveira, Pato n'Água, and for two and a half decades presided over the entity.

Aiming to meet changes that were emerging in the São Paulo samba scene, in the early 1970s, the president of Cordão Vai Vai, Pé Rachado, sought reinforcements, bringing from Fio de Ouro the whistler Feijoada, who before going to command Fio de Ouro's drum section, went out in Vai-Vai as a drummer, being one of Pato n'Água's disciples. With him also came great drummers to reinforce Vai-Vai's drum section, among them Antonio Carlos Tadeu de Souza (Tadeu Neguinho), who would later become one of the great drum masters of São Paulo carnival.

After Pé Rachado passed command to Pato n'Água, he in turn commanded the drum section until the mid-1950s and is to this day considered the whistler of whistlers. After that we had other great names on the whistle, such as Flavinho, Wanderlei, Louzazinho, Bolinha (winner of the golden whistle at Ibirapuera in 1968) and Feijoada, who was the last whistler of the cordão era.

Among the great drummers of that time we can highlight José Jambo Filho, better known as Seu Chiclé, who brought the repinique to the drum section in the mid-1960s; Tinho, who at Ibirapuera won as best drummer soloing on the repinique the song Pata-Pata, by Miriam Makeba, in 1970.

The school also had other great drummers such as Silas, Agadir, Polenta, Muru, Jacaré, Fala-Grosso, Didi, Tempestade, Evércio, Caveira, Baby Clóvis, Grim, Seu Amaro, Zé Pires, Jotai, Sabino, Bira, Netinho, Esquerdinha, Os Bombeiros, Balbino, Chinês, Ademir Parafuso, Caloi, Mamelão, Zé Carlos, Robertinho, Vadinho, Atilão, Testinha, Pelego, Zé da Ilha, Vilela, Mário Porpeta, Tomás, Dois e Quinhentos, Cinco Merréis, Dez Merréis, Borrão, Os Irmãos Corvos, Muru, São-Paulino, Tacun, Pneu, Paulo Porqueira, Bentinho, Flanela, Gurdura, Pesão, Iza, João Mãozinha, Nelsinho Branca de Neve, Zé Carlinhos, Pastel, Pastelzinho, Zé Pires, among others, with special mention for Roberto de Almeida, known as Geribá; Russinho, who specialized in playing cymbals at the front of the drum section and was successful until the mid-1980s.

Mestre Tadeu

In command of the drum section since the 1973 carnival is Antônio Carlos Tadeu, better known as Mestre Tadeu, considered a living heritage of Vai-Vai and São Paulo carnival. Mestre Tadeu arrived at Vai-Vai in the late 1960s, coming from the samba school Lavapés, one of the oldest in the São Paulo carnival, and shortly afterwards he assumed the position of drum master, where he has remained ever since. Mestre Tadeu has a total of 16 carnival champion titles, the first as a rhythmist when in 1970 Vai-Vai was crowned champion of the cordão group, and the other 15 as drum master of the school in the elite group of São Paulo carnival. He participated in all the titles in Vai-Vai's history after it became a samba school in 1972, an enviable mark that makes him the greatest title collector in the carnival. For 44 years as the school's drum master, Tadeu also holds the record for the longest-serving master commanding the same drum section in the history of the carnival in both São Paulo and Rio de Janeiro. From his hands and from this drum section came several drum directors of São Paulo, such as Magui, Tornado, Negativo, Thiago Praxedes, Beto Repinique and others. He nicknamed the drum section "Pegada de Macaco" (Monkey Grip), based on the film King Kong.

=== Drum Section Court ===
Period	Queen	Godmother	Princess	Ref.
2005	Elizabeth Santos	Luciana Gimenez		
2006	Elizabeth Santos			
2007	Daniela Rodrigues	Scheila Carvalho		
2008	Ivi Mesquita	Amanda Françozo		
2009–2010	Camila Silva	Amanda Françozo		
2011	Camila Silva	Maria Rita		
2012–2016	Camila Silva			
2017–2019	Camila Silva		Giuliana Silva	
2020		Verônica Bolani	Giuliana Silva	
2022	Verônica Bolani	Carla Prata	Giuliana Silva	
2023	Verônica Bolani	Elisangela Nicolelis	Giuliana Silva	
2024	Madu Fraga	Negra Li	Giuliana Silva	
2025	Madu Fraga	Luciana Gimenez	Giuliana Silva	
2026–	Madu Fraga	Rosiane Pinheiro	Giuliana Silva	

=== Great personalities ===
Among the founders of Vai-Vai are: Livinho, Frederico Penteado (Fredericão), Henricão, Tino, Lourival de Almeida (Loro), Lazinho, Lolo, João Penteado (Joãozinho), Lousa, Tonico, Biau, Zé Negrão, Fumaça, Zico, Isqueirinho, Argemiro, Zui, Ditinho Cristo (who was the first baliza of the cordão), Guariba (successor of Ditinho Cristo as baliza), Genésio (successor of Guariba, husband of Dona Otede), Moacir Arrelia, Moacir Mãe d'Água, Leco, Dona Castorina, Dona Iracema, Maria Preta, Ana Penteado, Dona Florinda (mother of Dona Sinhá), Dona Iría (wife of Livinho and mother of Dinha), Iara, Vó Anacleta (mother of Ditinho Cristo and grandmother of Pato n'Água), Dona Maria, Lucíola, Pitica, Clarinda, Ondina, Nizete, Vitorina, Olga, Sinhá (who was the first contra-baliza of the cordão), Dona Nina, Odila (the first lady in black), Dirce, Antonieta Penteado – Nêta – (the first queen of the cordão), Dona Iracema, Diamantino (Seu Nenê), Paulo Geremias (Seu Portela), Frederico Penteado Jr. (Ico), Moleque, Acácio, Carneirinho, Seo Anselmo, Sr José Antônio, among many others.

It is also important to highlight other important personalities in the school's history, such as: Bentinho da Cuíca, Tininha, Lucíola, Tica, Cida Pato, Cassimira, Regina Maura, Maria do Carmo, Arlindo Motorista, Djalma, Penteado, Julinho, Normando, Roberto Fardinha, Bolinha, Tigüera, Zé Roberto, Osvaldinho, Chimbó, Carmem, Fátima, Eliana, Sandrinha, Dona Paula, Mafalda, Niltes, Marrom, Nilton Baltazar, Walter Preto, Volnei, Peba, Éda, Rosely, Chicletinho, Zuccaro, Nelsinho, Dema Grapeti, Demã, Roberto Cartola, Serjão, Nino, Nena, Peru, Cleuza Amarante, Pato Roco, Cidinha Tergal, Sueli, Thune, Guaraná, Armando, Paulo Valentim, Boi, Santão, Amiginho, Miltom, Chapéu, Téti, Chuá, Carlão, Sol, Pedro Carneiro, Silvinho (Bacalhau), Lobão, Cizo, Zé Antônio and Dona Penha.

Dona Olímpia was responsible for more than two decades for the Cordão's court, where Teléco and Claudete held the position of king and queen for a long time, and had as princesses in the court, Cleuza, who would later have her glory as a flag bearer, and her sister Clélia, who in the 1950s went out in front of the drum section in ballet dancer costumes dancing "ballet" to the rhythm of samba. Cleuzí came as a baroness, and China, or rather Chininha, as she was affectionately called at the time, was a Duchess and arrived at Vai-Vai in the 1960s, composing the cordão's court together with: Dita, Laura, Dilma, Dinha, Iolanda, Marilia, Mercedes, Cidinha, Ditinha and Odila who came in the court as a lady in black.

Carioca, besides being a theme writer, was also a great composer, with the sambas from 1966 to 1970 being his authorship. With the return of themes in 1966, the figure of the porta-bandeira appeared in the cordão in the person of Clélia and the mestre-sala Neno, with Vai-Vai starting to parade with a pavilion and banner, conducted by Elisabete, until the transition from cordão to samba school.

The first show wing of Cordão Vai Vai was created in 1968, led by Clodoaldo (Tida), which had the name Ala Show Cuíca de Ouro, among its pioneers were Bagulé (citizen samba of 2005), Edney (former mestre-sala), Selma and Edna, who in 1968 at the 2nd Samba Symposium held in the Municipality of Santos, on the coast of São Paulo, won the title of best dancer in the "Sandália de Prata" contest, beating great dancers from São Paulo and Rio de Janeiro.

In 1971, Edna would become the queen of the cordão's drum section and later of the samba school. Bagulé, Tida and Edney, before setting up the show wing, were already renowned samba dancers, having long shown their talents as dancers at the front of Nossa Ala, which had as its leader the sambista Cleusí.

At that time, costumes were handled by the late "Madruga". In the early 1970s, the cordão's first student wing emerged, part of this wing were two young future architects Caio and Bia, who joined Madruga to design the costumes and floats for the cordão for the 1971 carnival, inviting Ângelo Careca, Alemão and Serginho (Pé), who had given a hand to Pé Rachado in the 1970 carnival, and also extended the invitation to Dona Paulina (Bia's mother).

Part of this group were names that would become top-notch sambistas, such as: Bolinha, Penteado, Julinho, Zé Roberto, Walter Preto, Eliana, Normanda, Tiguera, Didi and Feijoada, and with this group, the first carnival commission of Vai-Vai and of the São Paulo Carnival was established, which would also be responsible for the transformation of the Cordão into a Samba School.

Other great names were also part of this great Cordão, such as: Armandinho (from the Bixiga Museum), Seu Neno (from Bar do Petisco), Seu Mário (from the pharmacy), Ziniqui, Esquerdinha (from Lusitana), Rui Policia, Vicente Cucce (great collaborators of the cordão).

Lucíola, another great exponent of the cordão, because of her powerful and high-pitched voice, led the singing of the Cordão at rehearsals until the early 1960s, passing the role to Tininha, and currently the role is held by Cleuzí Penteado, who also holds the position of director of the children's wing for over 30 years. Cordão Vai Vai was a pioneer in everything, and one of its feats was that in 1968, in the Jaçanã neighborhood at Dona Paula's house (Normando's mother), Vai-Vai do Amanhã was founded, the first children's wing in São Paulo, and from this wing came great sambistas, such as carnival designer Vaníria Nejelschi.

When discussing the cordão, it is impossible to overlook Genésio, known as "The Baliza". Despite his short stature, he became a commanding presence at the head of the cordão, captivating audiences with his skillful performances and juggling of the baliza. He continued to hold this prominent role until the early 1970s. His memory lives on among those who knew him, particularly his family, led by the respected matriarch and sambista Dona Odete. For several decades, she was also a member of the cordão's court, where she became known for her elegant baroness costumes.

"What noise, what noise is that, what noise is that coming from there?": that's how Tino made his entry into the cordão in the mid-1930s and later, together with Leco, formed a partnership that yielded great sambas that continue to this day. Another great asset of the Cordão was Baiano, a professional musician and resident of Bixiga, who came to the front of the cordão playing his bugle announcing the arrival of Vai Vai: – "Come out the window, come and see Vai Vai pass by" – and like a magic trick, the street became full to see the beloved cordão.

Another great lady was Dona Ana Penteado who, since the cordão era, paraded as a baiana and later would become the symbol baiana of the samba school Vai-Vai.

== Symbols ==
The coffee branches were chosen to represent the coffee culture, which was one of the country's sources of wealth at the time.

The Crown symbolizes royalty and the magnitude of the black race. At that time, it was common for black people to affectionately call each other "Hi My King, Hi My Queen" (this form of address derives from the times of slavery), because a large part of the black men and women who came here as slaves were Kings and Queens in their lands (thus a fair tribute to the black and Bixiga family of São Paulo).

The symbol was idealized by Fredericão, drawn by Sardinha (with the crown based on the Portuguese court crown) and made by Dona Iracema. The banner became the maximum representation of the cordão, and they soon arranged someone to carry it, with the primacy given to Pitica, who passed the glory to Iara, who was succeeded by Dona Iracema, who before that succeeded Antonieta as queen of the cordão.

The nickname saracura was given because of the Saracura River that bordered Bela Vista, becoming pejorative; but thanks to the titles won, this nickname became a source of pride, remembered to this day.

== Titles ==
Titles of Vai-Vai
Division	Total	Year
Special Group	15	1978, 1981, 1982, 1986, 1987, 1988, 1993, 1996, 1998, 1999, 2000, 2001, 2008, 2011 and 2015
Access	2	2020 and 2023
Cordão	9	1934, 1940, 1941, 1942, 1943, 1944, 1947, 1967 and 1970

== Carnivals ==
Vai-Vai
Year	Placement	Division	Theme	Carnival designer	Ref.
1930	5th place	Cordão	Hail São Paulo, you have an indigo sky. You possess wealth and greatness, you are the heart of Brazil; Composer: Henrique Filipe da Costa "Henricão"	Carlos Júnior	
1931	3rd place	Cordão	Samba exalting the Vai-Vai cordão	Carnival Commission	
1932	Did not parade				
1933	4th place	Cordão	Samba honoring the Brazilian Navy	Carnival Commission	
1934	Champion	Cordão	II Taça Arthur Friendenreich	Carnival Commission	
1935	6th place	Cordão	Exaltation Samba	Carnival Commission	
1936	4th place	Cordão	Exaltation Samba	Carnival Commission	
1937	4th place	Cordão	Exaltation Samba	Carnival Commission	
1938	5th place	Cordão	Exaltation Samba	Carnival Commission	
1939	9th place	Cordão	Exaltation Samba	Carnival Commission	
1940	Champion	Cordão	Exaltation Samba	Carnival Commission	
1941	Champion	Cordão	Exaltation Samba	Carnival Commission	
1942	Champion	Cordão	Exaltation Samba	Carnival Commission	
1943	Champion	Cordão	Exaltation Samba	Carnival Commission	
1944	Champion	Cordão	Exaltation Samba	Carnival Commission	
1945	Runner-up	Cordão	Exaltation Samba	Carnival Commission	
1946	Runner-up	Cordão	Exaltation Samba	Carnival Commission	
1947	Champion	Cordão	Exaltation Samba	Carnival Commission	
1948	Runner-up	Cordão	Exaltation Samba	Carnival Commission	
1949	Runner-up	Cordão	Exaltation Samba	Carnival Commission	
1950	Runner-up	Cordão	Exaltation Samba	Carnival Commission	
1951	5th place	Cordão	Exaltation Samba	Carnival Commission	
1952	4th place	Cordão	Exaltation Samba	Carnival Commission	
1953	4th place	Cordão	Exaltation Samba	Carnival Commission	
1954	3rd place	Cordão	Exaltation Samba	Carnival Commission	
1955	5th place	Cordão	Exaltation Samba	Carnival Commission	
1956	5th place	Cordão	Exaltation Samba	Carnival Commission	
1957	Runner-up	Cordão	Exaltation Samba	Carnival Commission	
1958	3rd place	Cordão	Exaltation Samba	Carnival Commission	
1959	5th place	Cordão	Exaltation Samba	Carnival Commission	
1960	4th place	Cordão	Exaltation Samba	Carnival Commission	
1961	4th place	Cordão	Exaltation Samba	Carnival Commission	
1962	3rd place	Cordão	Exaltation Samba	Carnival Commission	
1963	3rd place	Cordão	Exaltation Samba	Carnival Commission	
1964	Runner-up	Cordão	Exaltation Samba	Carnival Commission	
1965	Runner-up	Cordão	Exaltation Samba	Carnival Commission	
1966	3rd place	Cordão	The second marriage of Dom Pedro I	Carnival Commission	
1967	Champion	Cordão	The second marriage of Dom Pedro I	Carnival Commission	
1968	Runner-up	Cordão	Exaltation to the Royal Family	Carnival Commission	
1969	Runner-up	Cordão	Aleijadinho	Carnival Commission	
1970	Champion	Cordão	Princess Leopoldina	Carnival Commission	
1971	Runner-up	Cordão	Independence or Death Composers: Zé Di	Carnival Commission	
1972	Runner-up	Group 1	Traveling through Brazil, samba shows what is yours	Carnival Commission	
1973	3rd place	Group 1	Lamartine Babo – Hymn to Brazilian Carnival	Carnival Commission	
1974	Runner-up	Group 1	Samba, Frevo and Maracatu Composers: Dominguinhos do Estácio, Theo da Cuíca and Bulau	Carnival Commission	
1975	5th place	Group 1	O Guarani Composers: Oswaldinho da Cuíca and Papete	Carnival Commission	
1976	Runner-up	Group 1	Solano Trindade, the Boy from Recife Composers: Geraldo Filme	Carnival Commission	
1977	Runner-up	Group 1	Father José Maurício Composers: Odair Fala Macio	Carnival Commission	
1978	Champion	Group 1	In Noah's Ark, those who entered never left Composers: Oswaldinho da Cuíca	Carnival Commission	
1979	4th place	Group 1	Party of a People in Dream and Fantasy	Carnival Commission	
1980	3rd place	Group 1	Pride of Saracura Composers: Almir and Luverci	Carnival Commission	
1981	Champion	Group 1	Believe it if you want Composers: Arouche and Pinho	Carnival Commission	
1982	Champion	Group 1	Orun Aiyê – The Eternal Dawn Composers: Oswaldinho da Cuíca and Serginho	Carnival Commission	
1983	Runner-up	Group 1	If the Fashion catches on... Composers: Namur and Macalé do Cavaco	Carnival Commission	
1984	4th place	Group 1	In the Sun of Caetana the Onça or Mirages of the Sertão Composers: Tadeu da Mazzei, Mario Sérgio, Jacó da Carolina, Penteado and Elisbão do Cavaco	Caio, Minoru and Tina	
1985	Runner-up	Group 1	Scented Water Composers: Turquinho and Nadão	Caio, Minoru and Tina	
1986	Champion	Group 1	The way we like it Composers: Walter Babu, Alemão and Chuveiro	Andrés Wilches	
1987	Champion	Group 1	Around the World in 80 Minutes Composers: Nadão, Ademir and Marino	Ciro Nascimento	
1988	Champion	Group 1	Amado Jorge, the Story of a Brazilian Race Composers: Oswaldinho da Cuíca, Namur and Macalé do Cavaco	Ulysses Cruz	
1989	4th place	Group 1	Wrote didn't read, the stage is mine Composers: Oswaldinho da Cuíca, Namur, Macalé do Cavaco	Ulysses Cruz	
1990	4th place	Group 1	60 Years in the Kingdom of Bananas Composers: Ademir, Neck's and Showxão	Fábio Brando and Luís Rossi	
1991	3rd place	Group 1	The Black in Art Form Composers: Mariano, Showxão, Afonsinho and Sorriso	Rui Ricardo Oliveira	
1992	Runner-up (Note: shared with Camisa Verde e Branco)	Special Group	Through seas never before sailed Composers: Naio Denay	Fábio Brando and Luís Rossi	
1993	Champion	Special Group	Not everything that glitters is Gold Composers: Zeca do Cavaco, Nayo Denay, Marquito and Afonsinho	Carnival Commission (Fábio Brando, Luís Rossi and Renato Teobaldo)	
1994	8th place	Special Group	Inã-Guê: catching Fire Composers: Tadeu da Mazzei, Jacó da Carolina and André	Fábio Brando and Luís Rossi	
1995	4th place	Special Group	Poetry came to the Land of Drizzle Composers: Wagner Santos, Edson Silva and Amauri	Fábio Brando and Luís Rossi	
1996	Champion	Special Group	The Queen, the Night transforms everything Composers: Wagner Santos and Borrão	Frank Gal	
1997	Runner-up	Special Group	Freedom even if Vai-Vai Composers: Vilma Correia and Washington da Mangueira	Chico Spinoza	
1998	Champion	Special Group	Banzai! Vai-Vai Composers: Zeca, Zé Carlinhos and Afonsinho	Chico Spinoza	
1999	Champion (Note: shared with Gaviões da Fiel)	Special Group	Nostradamus Composers: Zeca, Zé Carlinhos and Afonsinho	Chico Spinoza	
2000	Champion (Note: shared with X-9 Paulistana)	Special Group	Vai-Vai Brazil Composers: Zeca, Zé Carlinhos and Naio Denay	Flavio Tavares	
2001	Champion (Note: shared with Nenê de Vila Matilde)	Special Group	The Path of Light, Universal Peace Composers: Zeca, Zé Carlinhos, Naio Denay and Ronaldinho FDQ	Ilvamar Magalhães	
2002	5th place	Special Group	Locked with seven keys Composers: Zeca, Zé Carlinhos, Naio Denay, Ronaldinho FDQ	Ilvamar Magalhães	
2003	5th place	Special Group	Among Marches, Gallops and Rides; Composers: Danilo Alves, Régis, Vágner Almeida	Ilvamar Magalhães	
2004	11th place	Special Group	Do you want to know São Paulo? Come to Bixiga to see... Composers: Zeca do Cavaco, Zé Carlinhos and Naio Denay	Lane Santana	
2005	5th place	Special Group	I am also immortal Composers: Danilo Alves, Marquito, Estevan, Vagner Almeida, Mineiro, Régis, Frá and Japole	Raul Diniz	
2006	Runner-up	Special Group	São Vicente here began Brazil; Composers: Zé Carlinhos, Naio Denay, Benson, Wagner Almeida, Marcinho Z.S. and Loirinho do Cavaco	Raul Diniz	
2007	3rd place	Special Group	The 4th Kingdom, The Kingdom of the Absurd; Composers: Zé Carlinhos, Nayo Denai, Vagner Almeida and Danilo Alves	Chico Spinoza	
2008	Champion	Special Group	Vai-Vai wake up Brazil, the way out is to have hope Composers: Zé Carlinhos, Naio Denay, Vagner Almeida, Dalino Alves	Chico Spinoza	
2009	Runner-up	Special Group	Mens Sana et Corpore Sano – The Millennium of Overcoming; Composers: Zé Carlinhos, Naio Denay, Danilo Alves and Vagner Almeida.	Chico Spinoza	
2010	3rd place	Special Group	80 Years of Art and Euphoria, "It's Good in Samba, It's Good in Leather". Hail the Double Jubilee of Carvalho; Composers: Zeca do Cavaco, Afonsinho Bv, Fábio Henrique and Ronaldinho FDQ.	Carnival Commission (Lourival Almeida, Janaína, Neguitão, Renato Maluf, Adailson Jr., Claudio Norberto, Buiú, Miguel Bionde, Fernando Penteado, Lane Santana and Marcos Januário)	
2011	Champion	Special Group	Music Won Composers: Zeca do Cavaco, Ronaldinho FQ, Fábio Henrique and Afonsinho.	Alexandre Louzada	
2012	3rd place	Special Group	Women who shine – The Feminine Force in the Social and Cultural Progress of the Country; Composers: Afonsinho BV, Evaldo Sean Connory, Ronaldinho FDQ, Valter Camargo and Zeca do Cavaco.	Alexandre Louzada	
2013	7th place	Special Group	Blood of the earth, vine of life: A toast of love in the middle of the avenue – wines of Brazil! Composers: Evaldo Rodrigues, Osvaldinho Da Cuíca, Ronaldinho FQ, Valter Camargo and Zeca do Cavaco	Cahê Rodrigues	
2014	9th place	Special Group	In the flames of Vai-Vai, 50 years of Paulínia; Composers: Vagner Almeida, Mineiro, Marcinho Zona Sul, Loirinho and Edinho Gomes.	Chico Spinoza	
2015	Champion	Special Group	Simply Elis. The Fable of a Voice in the Transversal of Time Composers: Zeca do Cavaco, Zé Carlinhos and Ronaldinho FQD.	Carnival Commission (Alexandre Louzada, Eduardo Caetano and André Marins)	
2016	4th place	Special Group	Je Suis Vai-Vai – Welcome to France; Composers: Zeca do Cavaco, Zé Carlinhos, Ronaldinho FDQ and Dodo Monteiro	Renato Lage and Márcia Lage	
2017	3rd place	Special Group	In the Xirê of Anhembi, the most beautiful Oxum appeared... Menininha, mother of Bahia – Ialorixá of Brazil; Composers: Edegar Cirillo, Marcelo Casa Nossa, André Ricardo, Dema, Leonardo Rocha and Rodolfo Minuetto	Carnival Commission (Alexandre Louzada, André Marins and Júnior Schall)	
2018	10th place	Special Group	I'll samba with faith Composers: Edegar Cirillo, Marcelo Casa Nossa, André Ricardo, Dema, Gui Cruz, Rodolfo Minuetto, Rodrigo Minuetto and Kz	Carnival Commission (Alexandre Louzada, Júnior Schall, Chico Spinoza, Delmo de Moraes and Fernando Barata)	
2019	14th place	Special Group	Vai-Vai: the quilombo of the future Composers: Edegar Cirillo, Marcelo Casa Nossa, André Ricardo, Dema, Gui Cruz, Rodolfo Minuetto, Rodrigo Minuetto and KZ.	Roberto Monteiros and Hernani Siqueira	
2020	Champion	Access Group	Vai-Vai: body & Álamo Composers: Afonsinho, Ronaldinho, Koke, Damatta, Dani Almeida and KZ.	Chico Spinoza	
2021	Initially postponed to July, the 2021 Carnival parades were canceled due to the Covid-19 pandemic.				
2022	14th place	Special Group	Sankofa; Composers: Xande de Pilares, Peu, Cláudio Russo, Junior Gigante, Jairo Limozini and Bruno Giannelli	Chico Spinoza	
2023	Champion	Access Group	I Am Also Immortal (Re-edition of the 2005 carnival) Composers: Danilo Alves, Marquito, Estevan, Vagner Almeida, Mineiro, Régis, Frá and Japole.	Carnival Commission (Luiz Robles, Buiu, Paulo Rogério, Ezequiel, Luciana Radamés and Sidnei França)	
2024	8th place	Special Group	Chapter 4, Verse 3 – From the Street and the People, Hip hop: A Paulistano Manifesto Composers: Danni Almeida, Vagner Almeida, Marcinho Z.Sul, Clayton Dias, Luciano Bicudo, Claiton Asca, Rodrigo Atração, Edson Liz, Anderson Bueno, Bira Moreno, Mario Lucio, Leandro Martins and Reinaldo Papum.	Sidnei França	
2025	9th place	Special Group	The Devoured Shaman and the Bacchante Deglutition of Those Who Dared to Dream Disorder Composers: Naio Denay and Francis Gabriel.	Sidnei França	
2026	12th place	Special Group	Now Showing: The winning saga of a heroic people at the peak of Paulicéia's vedette Composers: Danni Almeida, Vagner Almeida, Marcinho Z. Sul, Anderson Bueno, Thiago de Xangô, Mário Lúcio, Vinícius Marques, Luciano Bicudo, João 10, Xavier, Cris Viana and Tião.	Carnival Commission (Marcus Tibechrani, Tati Gregório, Renato Anveres and Gleuson Pinheiro)	
2027		Special Group		Alexandre Louzada and Victor Santos	

== See also ==
- Carnival in Brazil
- São Paulo Carnival
- Samba school
