= Grupo de Acesso =

The Grupo de Acesso - Access Group - was created for the first time in the city of Rio de Janeiro when the UGESB, FBES and UCES resolved to organize a unique competition, unlike the last three years, where schools would be divided into groups.

Before this, there was only one association of samba schools and all the schools participated in the same division. However, in 1952, with the unification of the entities, people concluded that there were too many schools to parade in the same day, and divided the schools into groups according to each school's efficiency. Therefore, they decided to place in Group 1 (current Special Group) the best 24 schools, while the other schools would parade in Group 2 (current Access Group, or Grupo de Acesso), with the promise of possibilities of ascension or fall, promise that was only realized in 1954, two years later.

In 1960, Group 3 (current Access Group B) was created, and in 1979, the first change of names, with the first Group D. The divisions began to be called Group 1-A, 1-B, 2-A e 2-B.

In 1984, with the foundation of LIESA, the samba schools of Group 1-A began to not be affiliated to AESCRJ, returning to affiliate in case of lowering, to dispute Grupo 1-B. In the year of 1987, new change: the divisions began to be called 1, 2, 3 e 4. In 1990, Group 1 began to be called Grupo Especial, Groupo 2 becomes 1 and so forth. The 5th division, current Group E, was called the Access Group, properly said.

In other cities, the name "Grupo de Acesso" also exists, but it does not always mean the same thing as in Rio de Janeiro. In São Paulo, for example, the Access Group only refers to the second division, the one that is right below the Special Group, being that both (Access and Special Group) are administered by LigaSP. The other groups in São Paulo are administered by UESP.

Since carnival 2015, when LIERJ took on an emergency basis by modifying the Groups B, C, D for the Série B, C, D. However, with the arrival of new alloys LIESB and Samba é Nosso should return the group and now held on Saturday of Champions with a kind of evaluation.
