= Sambadrome =

Exhibition place for samba schools parades

Sambadrome (Portuguese: Sambódromo) is the name given to an exhibition place for the Samba schools parades during Carnaval in Brazil. A sambadrome generally consists of tiered spectator viewing areas surrounding a long alley for the schools to parade down.

== Sambadromes in Brazilian state capitals ==
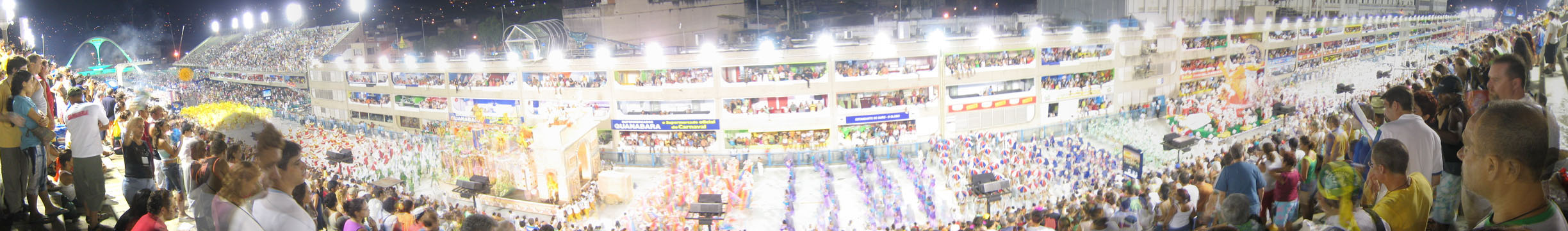
Samba parade at the Sambadrome Marquês de Sapucaí during Rio Carnival in 2006

| Sambadrome | City |
|---|---|
| Sambadrome Marquês de Sapucaí | Rio de Janeiro |
| Anhembi Sambadrome | São Paulo |
| Convention Center of Manaus | Manaus |
| Porto Seco's Cultural Complex | Porto Alegre |
| People's Sambão | Vitória |
| Passarela Nego Quirido | Florianópolis |
| Sambadrome School of Popular Arts | Macapá |
| David Miguel Village of Amazon Culture | Belém |

=== Other cities ===
| Sambadrome | City |
|---|---|
| Municipal Sambadrome of Bauru | Bauru |
| Address of Samba | Cabo Frio |
| Escola Multiuso Hildenburgo Moreira | Laguna |
| Sambadrome of Paulinia | Paulínia |
| Sambadrome of Santos | Santos |
| Sambadrome of Bebedouro | Bebedouro |
