= Mocidade Alegre =

Brazilian samba school

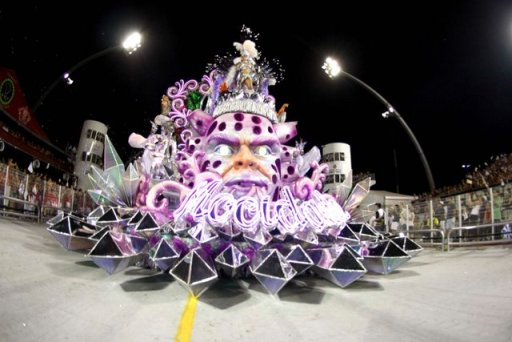
- Full name: Grêmio Recreativo Cultural Escola de Samba Mocidade Alegre
- Nickname(s): Morada do Samba (English: House of the samba)
- Foundation: September 24, 1967; 58 years ago
- Blessing school: Império do Samba
- Colors
- Symbol: A happy young couple dancing samba
- Location: Limão

Website
- mocidadealegre.com.br

Grêmio Recreativo Cultural Social Escola de Samba Mocidade Alegre, popularly known simply as Mocidade Alegre, is a samba school from São Paulo, Brazil.

== History ==
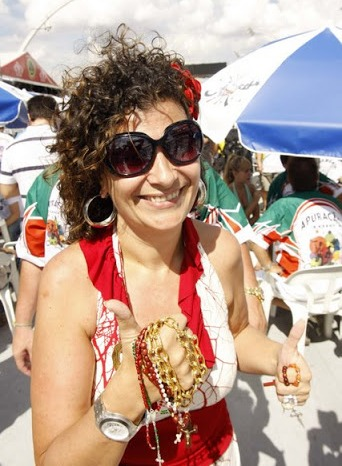
President Solange Bichara in counting of carnival

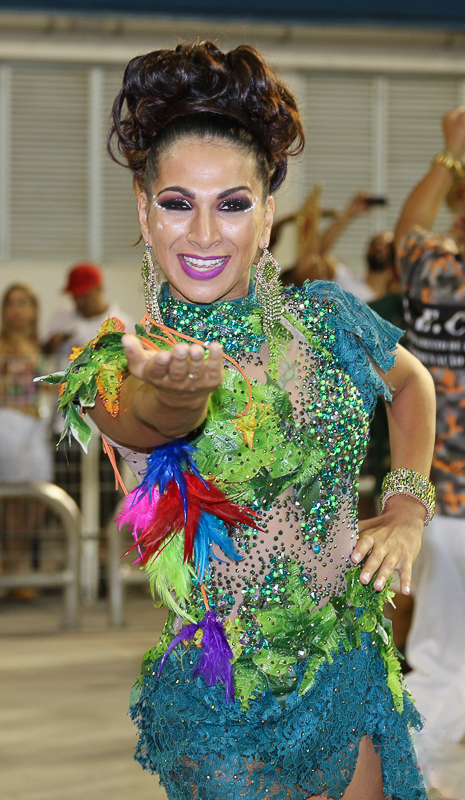
Aline Oliveira, current queen of battery of a samba school

It arose through a group of men dressed as women who went out by the streets of the Central Region of São Paulo. This group was formed by Juarez Cruz, his brothers Salvador Cruz, Carlos Cruz and two more friends. The three brothers came from the town of Campos dos Goytacazes and lived in São Paulo since 1948. Because of a joke, alluding to two situations that raged in São Paulo at the recovery of trams and closing of brothels of the Bom Retiro district by the city, the merrymakers baptised the group in 1958 as "Block of the first moths retrieved from Bom Retiro". Until then, only men participated in the group. In 1963, for the first time a woman paraded, a year when its members came out in clown costumes by Avenida São João.

In 1964, French François Bellot, director of Supermarket Peg Pag, where Juarez Cruz worked since 1955, requested the presence of the group to liven up a feast at his residence. From there, the supermarket began to help the carnival block. By suggestion of François Bellot, in 1965 the group, for the first time counting the women and children of their founders, participated in the Carnival of Saints, where there was a street carnival organized, unlike what happened in the capital.

== Classifications ==
Year	Place	Division	Plot	Carnivals Producers	Ref
Year	Place	Division	Plot	Singers	Ref
1968	5th place	Grupo 1	Festival Indígena		
1969	Champion	Bloco Especial	Na Corte de Nero		
1970	Champion	Grupo 2	Zumbi dos Palmares		
1971	Champion	Grupo 1	São Paulo e Seus Carnavais		
1972	Champion	Grupo 1	São Paulo, Trabalho, Seresta e Samba		
1973	Champion	Grupo 1	Odisseia de Uma Raça	Edson Machado	
1973	Champion	Grupo 1	Odisseia de Uma Raça	Carioca	
1974	3rd place	Grupo 1	Gamboa de Cima - Genaro de Carvalho	Edson Machado	
1974	3rd place	Grupo 1	Gamboa de Cima - Genaro de Carvalho	Carioca	
1975	3rd place	Grupo 1	No Alto do Caaguaçu - Avenida Paulista Antes e Depois	Edson Machado	
1975	3rd place	Grupo 1	No Alto do Caaguaçu - Avenida Paulista Antes e Depois	Carioca	
1976	4th place	Grupo 1	Tributo de uma Época	Edson Machado	
1976	4th place	Grupo 1	Tributo de uma Época	Carioca	
1977	3rd place	Grupo 1	Uma Vida no Palco, Homenagem a Procópio Ferreira	Edson Machado	
1977	3rd place	Grupo 1	Uma Vida no Palco, Homenagem a Procópio Ferreira	Carioca	
1978	3rd place	Grupo 1	Sonhando nos Braços de Morfeu	Edson Machado	
1978	3rd place	Grupo 1	Sonhando nos Braços de Morfeu	Nena	
1979	Vice Champion	Grupo 1	A Revolta dos Malês	Edson Machado	
1979	Vice Champion	Grupo 1	A Revolta dos Malês	Juburu	
1980	Champion	Grupo 1	Embaixada de Bambas e Samba - A Festa do Povo	Edson Machado	
1980	Champion	Grupo 1	Embaixada de Bambas e Samba - A Festa do Povo	Portela	
1981	Vice Champion	Grupo 1	Visungo Canto de Riqueza	Pedrinho Pinotti	
1981	Vice Champion	Grupo 1	Visungo Canto de Riqueza	Portela	
1982	5th place	Grupo 1	Malungos "Guerreiros Negros"	Pedrinho Pinotti	
1982	5th place	Grupo 1	Malungos "Guerreiros Negros"	Portela	
1983	4th place	Grupo 1	Ilusão do Fantástico Eldorado	Raul Diniz	
1983	4th place	Grupo 1	Ilusão do Fantástico Eldorado	Sargento Garcia	
1984	5th place	Grupo 1	Império das Artes - Missão Artística Francesa	Raul Diniz	
1984	5th place	Grupo 1	Império das Artes - Missão Artística Francesa	Diniz da Ebaixada	
1985	7th place	Grupo 1	Brasil, Menino Gigante	Zé Berno; Thomáz	
1985	7th place	Grupo 1	Brasil, Menino Gigante	Favela	
1986	4th place	Grupo 1	Apesar de Tudo, é Isso Aí	Zé Berno; Thomáz	
1986	4th place	Grupo 1	Apesar de Tudo, é Isso Aí	Juscelino	
1987	3rd place	Grupo 1	50 Anos de Comunicação – Moraes Sarmento	Tito Arantes	
1987	3rd place	Grupo 1	50 Anos de Comunicação – Moraes Sarmento	Juscelino	
1988	Vice Champion	Grupo 1	O Cientista Poeta - Paulo Vanzolini	Tito Arantes	
1988	Vice Champion	Grupo 1	O Cientista Poeta - Paulo Vanzolini	Juscelino	
1989	5th place	Grupo 1	Seiva Dia Vida – Thermas	Tito Arantes	
1989	5th place	Grupo 1	Seiva Dia Vida – Thermas	Carlão Maneiro	
1990	6th place	Grupo 1	A Nossa Pré-História. Quem Sou Eu?	Tito Arantes	
1990	6th place	Grupo 1	A Nossa Pré-História. Quem Sou Eu?	Carlão Maneiro	
1991	3rd place	Grupo Especial	A História se Repete	Mauricio Bichara	
1991	3rd place	Grupo Especial	A História se Repete	Carlão Maneiro	
1992	3rd place	Grupo Especial	A Espada Dia Liberdade – "Jornal O Estado de S. Paulo"	Mauricio Bichara	
1992	3rd place	Grupo Especial	A Espada Dia Liberdade – "Jornal O Estado de S. Paulo"	Carlão Maneiro	
1993	3rd place	Grupo Especial	Marabha "a Pérola do Oriente"	Mauricio Bichara	
1993	3rd place	Grupo Especial	Marabha "a Pérola do Oriente"	Carlão Maneiro	
1994	4th place	Grupo Especial	Somos Todos Irmãos	Mauricio Bichara	
1994	4th place	Grupo Especial	Somos Todos Irmãos	Carlão Maneiro	
1995	7th place	Grupo Especial	Do Rock ao Samba – Todo Mundo Maluco Beleza	Guilherme Resende	
1995	7th place	Grupo Especial	Do Rock ao Samba – Todo Mundo Maluco Beleza	Carlão Maneiro	
1996	3rd place	Grupo Especial	Uma História de Luxúria e Vaidade	Guilherme Resende	
1996	3rd place	Grupo Especial	Uma História de Luxúria e Vaidade	Vaguinho	
1997	6th place	Grupo Especial	O Mago do Universo - Hans Donner	Orlando Midaglia	
1997	6th place	Grupo Especial	O Mago do Universo - Hans Donner	Vaguinho	
1998	4th place	Grupo Especial	Essas Maravilhosas Mulheres Ousadas	Wagner Santos	
1998	4th place	Grupo Especial	Essas Maravilhosas Mulheres Ousadas	Nilson Valentim	
1999	7th place	Grupo Especial	Bahia...! Um Porto Seguro	Wagner Santos	
1999	7th place	Grupo Especial	Bahia...! Um Porto Seguro	Nilson Valentim; Neguinho da Beija-Flor	
2000	3rd place	Grupo Especial	Historia Brasiliae, Cultura, Hábitos e Costumes de uma Holanda Tropical	Wagner Santos	
2000	3rd place	Grupo Especial	Historia Brasiliae, Cultura, Hábitos e Costumes de uma Holanda Tropical	Clóvis Pê	
2001	7th place	Grupo Especial	A Lenda da Lenda – do Fascínio de Ophir ao Mistério das Encantadas	Alexandre Colla	
2001	7th place	Grupo Especial	A Lenda da Lenda – do Fascínio de Ophir ao Mistério das Encantadas	Daniel Collête	
2002	8th place	Grupo Especial	Do Néctar dos Deuses ao Alimento de Homens e Feras, "Deleite-se ao Sabor do Leite"	Nelson Ferreira	
2002	8th place	Grupo Especial	Do Néctar dos Deuses ao Alimento de Homens e Feras, "Deleite-se ao Sabor do Leite"	Daniel Collête	
2003	Vice Champion	Grupo Especial	Omi – O Berço da Civilização Iorubá	Nelson Ferreira	
2003	Vice Champion	Grupo Especial	Omi – O Berço da Civilização Iorubá	Daniel Collête	
2004	Champion	Grupo Especial	Do Além-Mar à Terra da Garoa... Salve Esta Gente Boa	Nelson Ferreira	
2004	Champion	Grupo Especial	Do Além-Mar à Terra da Garoa... Salve Esta Gente Boa	Daniel Collête	
2005	3rd place	Grupo Especial	Clara, Claridade... O Canto de Luz no Ylê da Mocidade	Zilkson Reis	
2005	3rd place	Grupo Especial	Clara, Claridade... O Canto de Luz no Ylê da Mocidade	Daniel Collête	
2006	3rd place	Grupo Especial	Das Lágrimas de Iaty Surge o Rio, do Imaginário Indígena a Saga de Opara. Para os Olhos do Mundo um Símbolo de Integração Nacional: Rio São Francisco	Zilkson Reis	
2006	3rd place	Grupo Especial	Das Lágrimas de Iaty Surge o Rio, do Imaginário Indígena a Saga de Opara. Para os Olhos do Mundo um Símbolo de Integração Nacional: Rio São Francisco	Daniel Collête	
2007	Champion	Grupo Especial	Posso Ser Inocente, Debochado e Irreverente... Afinal, Sou o Riso dessa Gente	Zilkson Reis	
2007	Champion	Grupo Especial	Posso Ser Inocente, Debochado e Irreverente... Afinal, Sou o Riso dessa Gente	Daniel Collête	
2008	Vice Champion	Grupo Especial	Bem-vindo a São Paulo. Sabe por quê? Porque São Paulo é Tudo de Bom!!!	Zilkson Reis	
2008	Vice Champion	Grupo Especial	Bem-vindo a São Paulo. Sabe por quê? Porque São Paulo é Tudo de Bom!!!	Clóvis Pê	
2009	Champion	Grupo Especial	Da Chama da Razão ao Palco das Emoções... Sou Máquina, Sou Vida... Sou Coração Pulsando Forte na Avenida	Fábio Lima; Flávio Campello; Márcio Gonçalves; Sidnei França	
2009	Champion	Grupo Especial	Da Chama da Razão ao Palco das Emoções... Sou Máquina, Sou Vida... Sou Coração Pulsando Forte na Avenida	Clóvis Pê	
2010	Vice Champion	Grupo Especial	Da criação do universo ao sonho eterno do criador ... Eu sou espelho e me espelho em quem me criou	Fábio Lima; Márcio Gonçalves; Sidnei França	
2010	Vice Champion	Grupo Especial	Da criação do universo ao sonho eterno do criador ... Eu sou espelho e me espelho em quem me criou	Clóvis Pê	
2011	7th place	Grupo Especial	Carrossel das Ilusões	Márcio Gonçalves; Sidnei França	
2011	7th place	Grupo Especial	Carrossel das Ilusões	Clóvis Pê	
2012	Champion	Grupo Especial	Ojuobá - No Céu, os Olhos do Rei... Na Terra, a Morada dos Milagres... No Coração, Um Obá Muito Amado!	Márcio Gonçalves; Sidnei França	
2012	Champion	Grupo Especial	Ojuobá - No Céu, os Olhos do Rei... Na Terra, a Morada dos Milagres... No Coração, Um Obá Muito Amado!	Clóvis Pê	
2013	Champion	Grupo Especial	A Sedução me fez provar, me entregar à Tentação...Da Versão Original, qual será o final?	Márcio Gonçalves; Sidnei França	
2013	Champion	Grupo Especial	A Sedução me fez provar, me entregar à Tentação...Da Versão Original, qual será o final?	Clóvis Pê	
2014	Champion	Grupo Especial	Andar com fé eu vou que a fé não costuma falhar	Márcio Gonçalves; Sidnei França	
2014	Champion	Grupo Especial	Andar com fé eu vou que a fé não costuma falhar	Igor Sorriso	
2015	Vice Champion	Grupo Especial	Nos palcos da vida... Uma vida no palco: Marília	Márcio Gonçalves; Sidnei França	
2015	Vice Champion	Grupo Especial	Nos palcos da vida... Uma vida no palco: Marília	Igor Sorriso	
2016	3rd place	Grupo Especial	Ayô – A Alma Ancestral do Samba	Sidnei França	
2016	3rd place	Grupo Especial	Ayô – A Alma Ancestral do Samba	Igor Sorriso	
2017	7th place	Grupo Especial	A vitória vem da luta, a luta vem da força, e a força, da união	Leandro Vieira; Paulo Brasil; Carlinhos Lopes; Neide Lopes	
2017	7th place	Grupo Especial	A vitória vem da luta, a luta vem da força, e a força, da união	Tiganá; Ito Melodia	
2018	Vice Champion	Grupo Especial	A Voz Marrom que não Deixa o Samba Morrer	Paulo Brasil; Carlinhos Lopes; Neide Lopes	
2018	Vice Champion	Grupo Especial	A Voz Marrom que não Deixa o Samba Morrer	Tiganá; Ito Melodia	
2019	8th place	Grupo Especial	Ayakamaé - As águas sagradas do sol e da lua	Paulo Brasil; Carlinhos Lopes; Neide Lopes; Márcio Gonçalves	
2019	8th place	Grupo Especial	Ayakamaé - As águas sagradas do sol e da lua	Igor Sorriso	
2020	3rd place	Grupo Especial	Do canto das Yabás renasce uma nova Morada	Paulo Brasil; Márcio Gonçalves; Edson Pereira	
2020	3rd place	Grupo Especial	Do canto das Yabás renasce uma nova Morada	Igor Sorriso	
2022	Vice Champion	Grupo Especial	Quelémentina, cadê Você?	Márcio Gonçalves; Edson Pereira	
2022	Vice Champion	Grupo Especial	Quelémentina, cadê Você?	Igor Sorriso	
