= Cidade do Samba =

Cidade do Samba Joãosinho Trinta
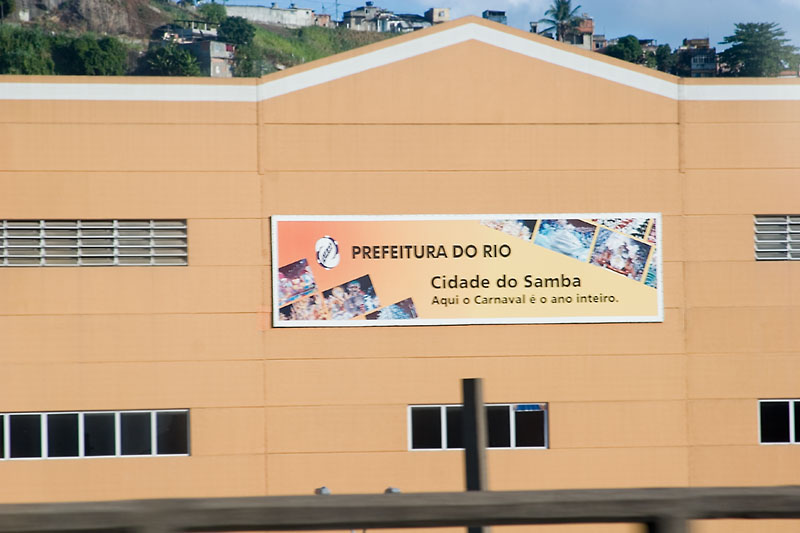
- Façade of Cidade do Samba Joãosinho Trinta
- Interactive map of the Cidade do Samba Joãosinho Trinta area
- Alternative names: Cidade do Samba

General information
- Location: Rua Rivadávia Correa nº 60, Gamboa, Zona Portuária, Rio de Janeiro, Brazil
- Coordinates: 22.8966513°S 43.1973459°W

Cidade do Samba (Portuguese, Samba City), formally known as Cidade do Samba Joãosinho Trinta, is a complex of buildings in the neighborhood of Gamboa, Rio de Janeiro, Brazil. It is used for Samba schools to prepare for carnival. About fourteen of the major samba schools have a warehouse in the complex.

== February 2011 fire ==
On the early morning of Monday February 7, 2011, four weeks before carnival, a fire broke out in the buildings. The warehouses contain many costumes and floats, often composed with inflammable materials. Some 8400 costumes and twenty floats, belonging to three samba schools, might be lost

== Cidade do Samba Joãosinho Trinta 2024 ==
Warehouse	Samba school
1	Viradouro
2	Imperatriz
3	LIESA
4	Grande Rio
5	Vila Isabel
6	Portela
7	Porto da Pedra
8	Salgueiro
9	Paraíso do Tuiuti
10	Mocidade
11	Beija-Flor
12	Unidos da Tijuca
13	Mangueira
14	LIESA
