= Acadêmicos do Grande Rio =

Samba school in Rio de Janeiro, Brazil

Grande Rio
- Foundation: 22 September 1988; 37 years ago
- Blessing school: Salgueiro
- President: Milton Perácio
- Honorary president: Jayder Soares; Helinho de Oliveira
Carnival staff
- Carnival producer: Gabriel Haddad; Leonardo Bora
- Carnival singer: Evandro Malandro
- Carnival director: Thiago Monteiro
- Harmony director: Andrezinho; Caca Santos; Clayton Bola; Helinho Aguiar; Jeferson Guimarães
- Director of Battery: Mestre Fafá
- Queen of Battery: Paolla Oliveira
- Mestre-sala and Porta-Bandeira: Daniel Werneck; Taciana Couto
- Choreography: Hélio Bejani; Beth Bejani

The Grêmio Recreativo Escola de Samba Acadêmicos do Grande Rio is a samba school of the Special Group of the carnival of the city of Rio de Janeiro, being headquartered on Almirante Barroso street in Duque de Caxias.

== History ==
In the 1950s, the city of Duque de Caxias had an effective participation in the Carioca Carnival, with the samba school Cartolinhas de Caxias. This school was placed among the elite of the schools 3 times (1951, 1958 e 1959), posteriorly placed, and frequently, among the intermediate schools and being well respected in the samba world. The last parade of Cartolinhas was in 1971, when with the goal to found a big school, that would worthily represent the municipality of the directors of Grande Rio and Acadêmicos de Caxias, these two schools unified and created in 1988, the Grêmio Recreativo Escola de Samba Acadêmicos do Grande Rio.

The school is very criticized for excessively taking famous people to the avenue and for its excellent results in the judging commission, because of the investments of the patron Jayder Soares and of Milton Perácio, that was the first president of the school.

Like mentioned above, Grande Rio has become specially notorious for bringing famous actresses as Queen of the Drums Sections, called "Rainhas de Bateria". Some of these celebrities below were included over the last years:

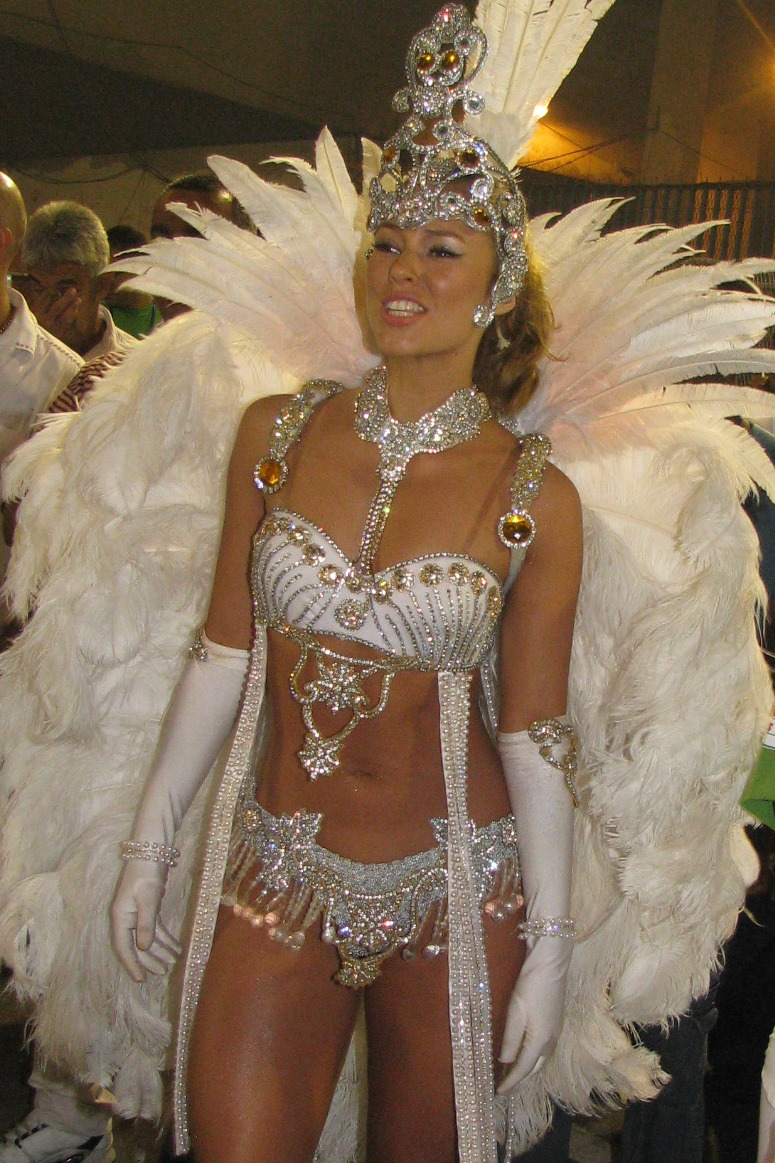
Paola Oliveira

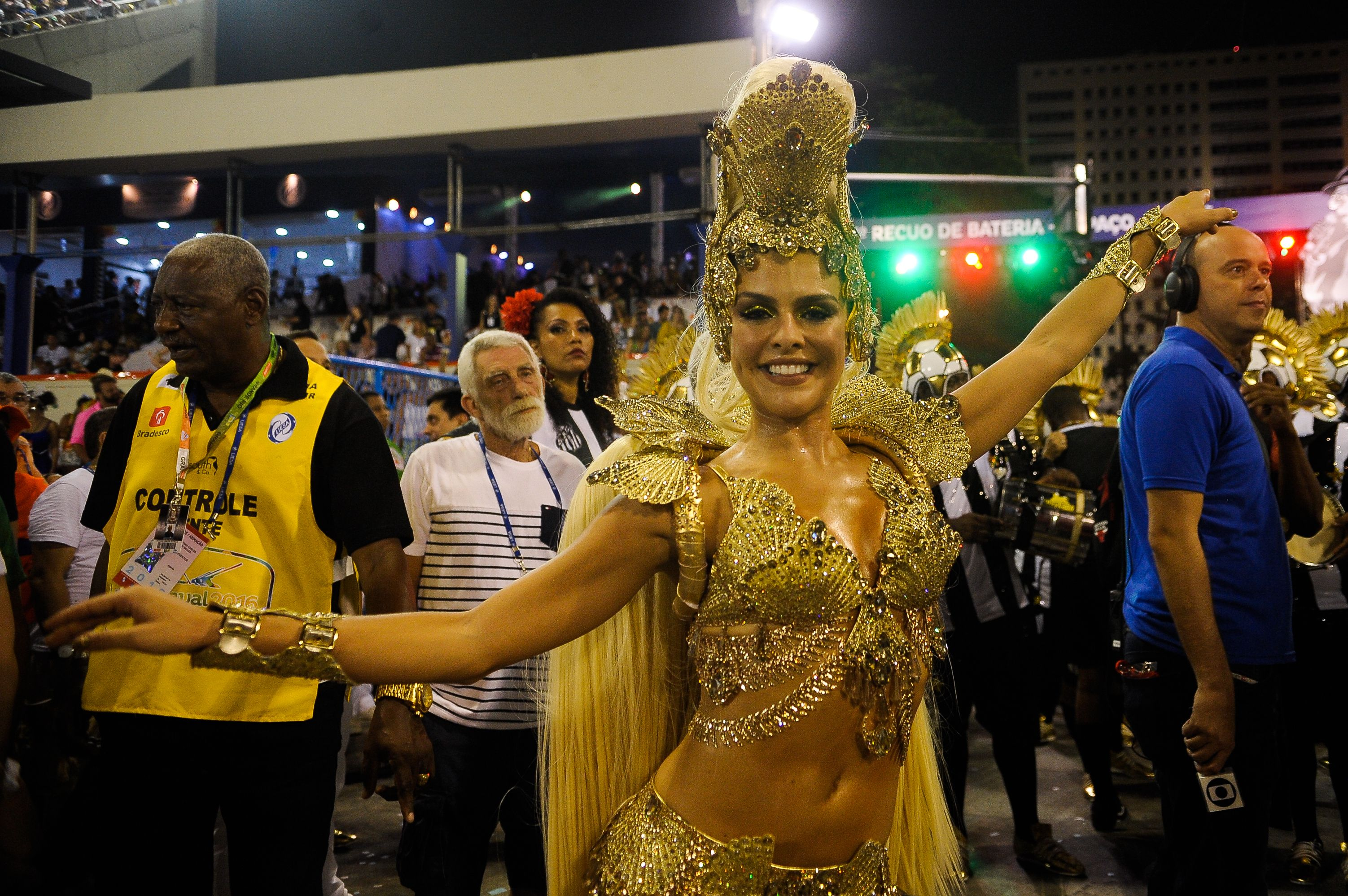
Paloma Bernardi

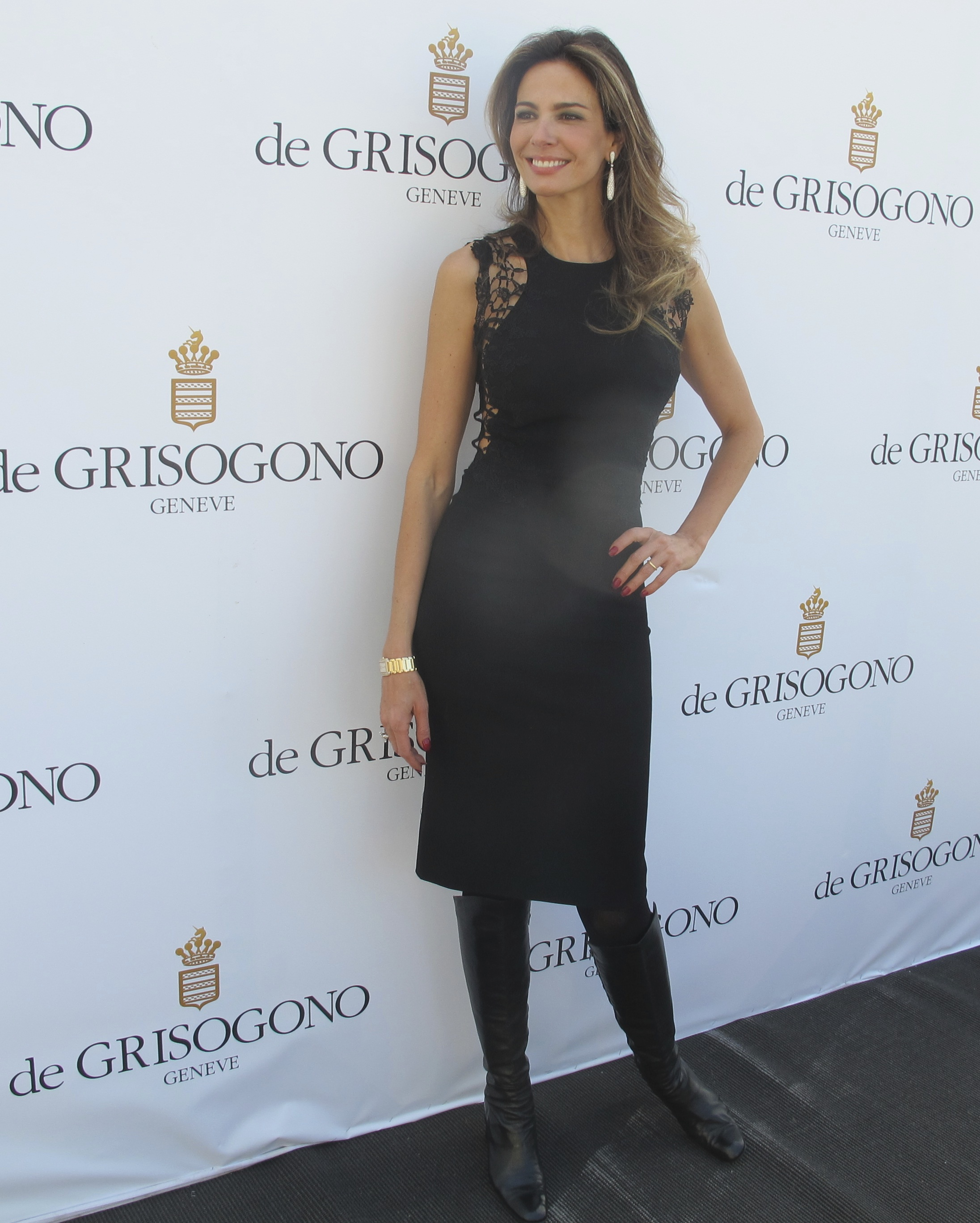
Luciana Gimenez

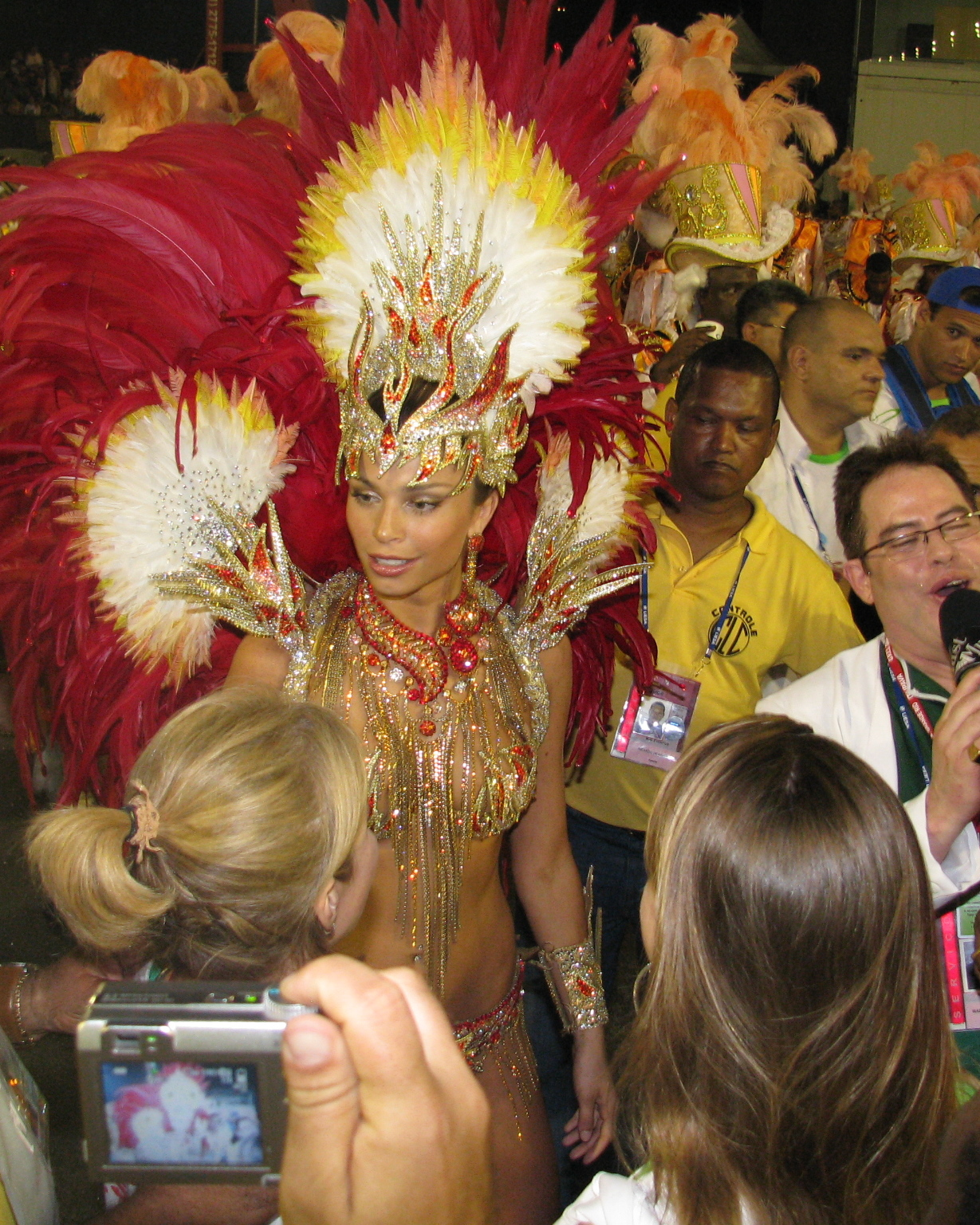
Grazi Massafera

== Carnavals of Grande Rio ==
In its debut, in 1989, the school already rose to the next group, passing to the Grupo de Acesso A. In 1990, with the samba-enredo (plot) about the city of Rio de Janeiro, it won second and thus won promoted to the Special Group. When it starred among the big schools, the school did not go well:with the plot Antes, Durante e Depois: o despertar do homem ("Before, During, and After:the rouse of the man"), the school was placed in the 16th collocation, and returnmed to Grupo de Acesso A, despite to count on people such as the singer Dominguinhos do Estácio and the bateria director Mestre Paulão (consecrated in União da Ilha).

In 1992, the school reconquered the right to compete in the principal parade, being the champion of the Grupo de Acesso, with the plot Águas Claras para um Rei Negro ("Clear Waters for a Black King"). In its return to the Grupo Especial, with the plot No mundo da lua ("In the world of the moon"), of Alexandre Louzada, the school stimulated the Marquês de Sapucaí and was placed in the 9th collocation. In the following years, it did not have good results, but always maintained itself in the Special Group.

The arrival of Max Lopes to Grande Rio, in 1998, made the school obtain again good collocations. With a plot in honor to Luís Carlos Prestes, obtained the 8th collocation; in 1999, homaging Chatô, the school obtained its best collocation until then: 6th place. In 2000, with the Carnaval at sight, talked about the carnavals and the Brazilian parties celebrated for 500 years. A 9th place was not well received by the school, that would already leave an imprint in the Carioca Carnaval.

In 2001, the school brought again a good samba (this time with Quinho), and the star Joãosinho Trinta in command to tell the story of José Datrino. Once again, all complained about the school's 6th place, with no right to parade in the Parade of the Champions. In 2002, did not succeed to return to the Parade of the Champions, because it was placed in the 7th collocation. In 2003, with the plot O nosso Brasil que vale ("Our Brazil that is Worth"), the school of Duque de Caxias, finally succeeded to parade in the Parade of the Champions, with the third place celebrated like it was the title.

In the carnaval of 2004, the school had a bad accomplishment. Bringing a plot about the prevention of the AIDS, everything went bad: some floats were considered immodest and were censured and paraded covered, and even the parade itself was quite drowsy; the only exceptions were the good performance of the bateria and the tune of the community. Result: 10th place and the demmission of Joãosinho Trinta after the parade.

In 2005, the school did again a good parade, with the plot Alimentar o corpo e alma faz bem ("Feeding the body and the soul is good"). Counting on the sponsorship of Nestle, it brought well-built cars, a happy parade, great acting of the bateria, and conquest. Because of that the school was placed, like in 2003, in the third collocation. In the carnaval of 2006, telling the history of the exploration in the Amazon, the Grande Rio conquers its best result: the vice-championship, because it lost two tenths for exceeding the maximum time of parade in 1 minute (what took to the tie in number of points with the school Unidos de Vila Isabel, that won for having better notes in the requirements of tie breaking).

In 2007, the school homaged its city, Duque de Caxias, plot signed by the carnaval producer Roberto Szaniecki (that already signed the carnavals of 1996, 2005, and 2006 of the school). The school conquered its vice-championship for the second time.

For the carnaval of 2008, the school of Duque de Caxias brought to the Sambadrome the theme of the importance of gas in daily life, honoring the city of Coari, in Amazonas, that possesses the petrochemical pole of Petrobrás, and achieved a third place finish. Roberto Szaniecki departed after the results.

In 2010, the school took runner up honors in that year's Carnival edition. In the carnaval of 2018, In 2018, the school has hired the experienced carnival Renato Lage and Márcia Lage that together signed the last fifteen carnivals in of the school-godmother, the Salgueiro. Where a problem in the last car of the school and holes in evolution, in which resulted in a loss of 0.5 tenths and the school's relegation to Serie A after 26 years, however the decision was overturned and the school remains as of today part of the Special Group.

The 2022 Carnival would prove to be Grande Rio's best finish yet, as it ended with the school's first general championship of the Special Group division.

== Titles and prizes ==
- Grupo Especial (First division of Rio Carnival): 2022
- Estandarte de Ouro (best plot - Grupo Especial): 2022
- Grupo de Acesso A (second division): 1992
- Estandarte de Ouro (best plot): 1994
- Estandarte de Ouro (best samba/Grupo de Acesso): 1992
- Best place in the Special Group: 2006 and 2007 (2 vice-championships)

== Historic names of the school ==
- Joãosinho Trinta
- Nêgo
- Jayder Soares
- Leandrinho
- Mestre Odilon
- Milton Perácio
- Emerson Dias
- Susana Vieira
- Paolla Oliveira

== Classifications ==
Year	Place	Division	Plot	Carnivals Producers
Year	Place	Division	Plot	Singers
1989	Vice Champion	Grupo 3	O mito sagrado de Ifé	Edson Mendes; Ricardo Ayres
1990	Vice Champion	Grupo A	Porque sou carioca	Wany Araújo; Fernando Lopes Paz
1990	Vice Champion	Grupo A	Porque sou carioca	Dominguinhos do Estácio
1991	16th place	Grupo Especial	Antes, durante e depois, o despertar do homem	Wany Araújo; Fernando Lopes Paz
1991	16th place	Grupo Especial	Antes, durante e depois, o despertar do homem	Dominguinhos do Estácio
1992	Champion	Grupo A	Águas claras para um rei negro	Lucas Pinto; Sônia Regina
1992	Champion	Grupo A	Águas claras para um rei negro	David do Pandeiro
1993	9th place	Grupo Especial	No mundo da lua	Alexandre Louzada
1993	9th place	Grupo Especial	No mundo da lua	Nêgo
1994	12th place	Grupo Especial	Os santos que a África não viu	Lucas Pinto
1994	12th place	Grupo Especial	Os santos que a África não viu	Nêgo
1995	16th place	Grupo Especial	História para ninar um povo patriota	Lucas Pinto
1995	16th place	Grupo Especial	História para ninar um povo patriota	Nêgo
1996	11th place	Grupo Especial	Na era dos Felipes o Brasil era espanhol	Roberto Szaniecki
1996	11th place	Grupo Especial	Na era dos Felipes o Brasil era espanhol	Nêgo
1997	10th place	Grupo Especial	Madeira-Mamoré, a volta dos que não foram, lá no Guaporé	Alexandre Louzada
1997	10th place	Grupo Especial	Madeira-Mamoré, a volta dos que não foram, lá no Guaporé	Nêgo
1998	8th place	Grupo Especial	Prestes, o cavaleiro da esperança	Max Lopes
1998	8th place	Grupo Especial	Prestes, o cavaleiro da esperança	Nêgo
1999	6th place	Grupo Especial	Ei, ei, ei, Chateau é nosso rei!	Max Lopes
1999	6th place	Grupo Especial	Ei, ei, ei, Chateau é nosso rei!	Nêgo
2000	9th place	Grupo Especial	Carnaval à vista - não fomos catequizados, fizemos Carnaval	Max Lopes
2000	9th place	Grupo Especial	Carnaval à vista - não fomos catequizados, fizemos Carnaval	Nêgo
2001	6th place	Grupo Especial	Gentileza "X" - O profeta do fogo	Joãosinho Trinta
2001	6th place	Grupo Especial	Gentileza "X" - O profeta do fogo	Quinho
2002	7th place	Grupo Especial	Os papagaios amarelos nas terras encantadas do Maranhão	Joãosinho Trinta
2002	7th place	Grupo Especial	Os papagaios amarelos nas terras encantadas do Maranhão	Quinho
2003	3rd place	Grupo Especial	O nosso Brasil que Vale	Joãosinho Trinta
2003	3rd place	Grupo Especial	O nosso Brasil que Vale	Wander Pires
2004	10th place	Grupo Especial	Vamos vestir a camisinha meu amor!	Joãosinho Trinta
2004	10th place	Grupo Especial	Vamos vestir a camisinha meu amor!	Wander Pires
2005	3rd place	Grupo Especial	Alimentar o corpo e alma faz bem!	Roberto Szaniecki
2005	3rd place	Grupo Especial	Alimentar o corpo e alma faz bem!	Wander Pires
2006	Vice Champion	Grupo Especial	Amazonas, o Eldorado é Aqui	Roberto Szaniecki
2006	Vice Champion	Grupo Especial	Amazonas, o Eldorado é Aqui	Bruno Ribas
2007	Vice Champion	Grupo Especial	Duque de Caxias, o Caminho do Progresso, o Retrato do Brasil	Roberto Szaniecki
2007	Vice Champion	Grupo Especial	Duque de Caxias, o Caminho do Progresso, o Retrato do Brasil	Wander Pires
2008	3rd place	Grupo Especial	Do Verde de Coari, Vem Meu Gás, Sapucaí!	Roberto Szaniecki
2008	3rd place	Grupo Especial	Do Verde de Coari, Vem Meu Gás, Sapucaí!	Wander Pires
2009	5th place	Grupo Especial	Voilá, Caxias! Para sempre liberté, egalité, fraternité, merci beaucoup, Brésil! Não tem de quê!	Cahê Rodrigues
2009	5th place	Grupo Especial	Voilá, Caxias! Para sempre liberté, egalité, fraternité, merci beaucoup, Brésil! Não tem de quê!	Wantuir
2010	Vice Champion	Grupo Especial	Das arquibancadas ao camarote número 1, um Grande Rio de emoção, na Apoteose do seu coração	Cahê Rodrigues
2010	Vice Champion	Grupo Especial	Das arquibancadas ao camarote número 1, um Grande Rio de emoção, na Apoteose do seu coração	Wantuir
2011	Hors Concours	Grupo Especial	Y-Jurerê Mirim - A Encantadora Ilha das Bruxas (Um conto de Cascaes)	Cahê Rodrigues
2011	Hors Concours	Grupo Especial	Y-Jurerê Mirim - A Encantadora Ilha das Bruxas (Um conto de Cascaes)	Wantuir
2012	5th place	Grupo Especial	Eu acredito em você. E você?	Cahê Rodrigues
2012	5th place	Grupo Especial	Eu acredito em você. E você?	Wantuir
2013	6th place	Grupo Especial	Amo o Rio e vou à luta: ouro negro sem disputa... Contra an injustiça em defesa do Rio	Roberto Szaniecki
2013	6th place	Grupo Especial	Amo o Rio e vou à luta: ouro negro sem disputa... Contra an injustiça em defesa do Rio	Emerson Dias; Nêgo
2014	6th place	Grupo Especial	Verdes olhos de Maysa sobre o mar, no caminho: Maricá	Fábio Ricardo
2014	6th place	Grupo Especial	Verdes olhos de Maysa sobre o mar, no caminho: Maricá	Emerson Dias
2015	3rd place	Grupo Especial	A Grande Rio é do Baralho	Fábio Ricardo
2015	3rd place	Grupo Especial	A Grande Rio é do Baralho	Emerson Dias
2016	7th place	Grupo Especial	Fui no Itororó beber água, não achei. Mas achei a bela Santos, e por ela me apaixonei...	Fábio Ricardo
2016	7th place	Grupo Especial	Fui no Itororó beber água, não achei. Mas achei a bela Santos, e por ela me apaixonei...	Emerson Dias
2017	5th place	Grupo Especial	Ivete do rio ao Rio!	Fábio Ricardo
2017	5th place	Grupo Especial	Ivete do rio ao Rio!	Emerson Dias
2018	12th place	Grupo Especial	Vai para o trono ou não vai?	Renato Lage; Márcia Lage
2018	12th place	Grupo Especial	Vai para o trono ou não vai?	Emerson Dias
2019	9th place	Grupo Especial	Quem nunca?... Que atire a primeira pedra!	Renato Lage; Márcia Lage
2019	9th place	Grupo Especial	Quem nunca?... Que atire a primeira pedra!	Evandro Malandro
2020	Vice Champion	Grupo Especial	Tata Londira: O canto do caboclo no quilombo de Caxias	Gabriel Haddad; Leonardo Bora
2020	Vice Champion	Grupo Especial	Tata Londira: O canto do caboclo no quilombo de Caxias	Evandro Malandro
2022	Champion	Grupo Especial	Fala, Majeté! Sete chaves de Exu	Gabriel Haddad; Leonardo Bora
2022	Champion	Grupo Especial	Fala, Majeté! Sete chaves de Exu	Evandro Malandro
