= Unidos do Viradouro =

Samba school

Viradouro
- Full name: Grêmio Recreativo Escola de Samba Unidos do Viradouro
- Foundation: June 24, 1946; 79 years ago
- Blessing school: Portela
- Colors
- Symbol: crown with a five-pointed star on top, an interracial handshake, and wheat branches
- Location: Barreto, Niterói
- President: Hélio Nunes
Carnival staff
- Carnival producer: Tarcisio Zanon
- Carnival singer: Wander Pires
- Director of Battery: Mestre Ciça
- Queen of Battery: Érika Januza
- Mestre-sala and Porta-Bandeira: Julinho and Rute Alves
- Choreography: Priscila Mottta and Rodrigo Negri

Website
- unidosdoviradouro.com.br

Grêmio Recreativo Escola de Samba Unidos do Viradouro, or simply Viradouro or Unidos do Viradouro, is a samba school that competes in the Carnival city of Rio de Janeiro. It is located in the Barreto neighborhood in Niterói.

== History ==
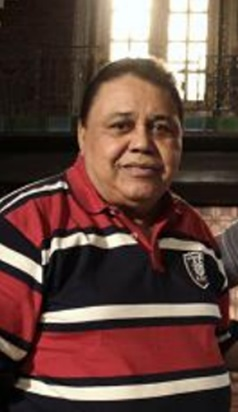
Dominguinhos do Estácio, one of the great singers of carnival and who identified himself much with the school

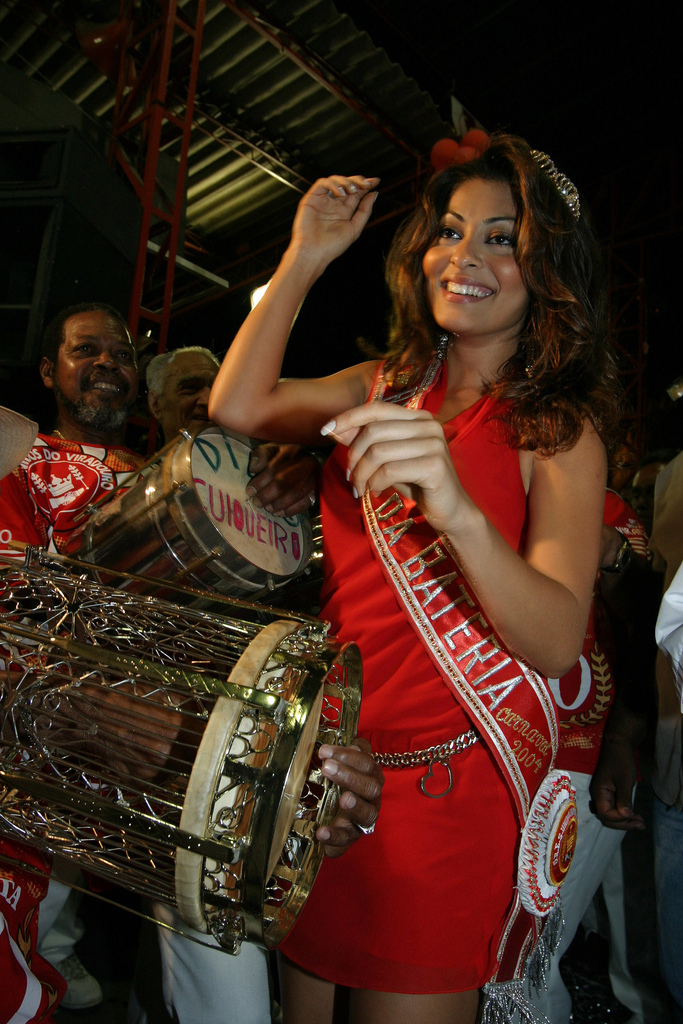
The actress Juliana Paes, who was a great queen of battery of college from 2004 to 2008

It was founded on 24 June 1946 by Nelson dos Santos, known as Jangada, who organized drumming in the backyard of his home in Capitão Roseira, at the top of D. Mário Viana street, known as Viradouro street. He also competed in the Niterói parades for 39 years (1947 to 1985); however, during the period he came to Rio de Janeiro a few times (64 and 65), getting more than a 26th in the third division.

After being champion eighteen times, Viradouro decided to try their luck again in 1986. They gave good shows in the lower groups, where they won Group 3 in 1989 with the theme "merchants and peddlers" and Group 1 the following year with "Just the written", coming to the special group in 1991.

In 1992, they presented the plot A magia da sorte chego by Max Lopes, and told the story of the gypsies. However, the school could not count on such luck in their parade, where one of the floats caught fire and burned uncontrollably. Many wards had to squeeze together to make way for a fire department vehicle. This delay resulted in the loss of 13 points in timing, and these lost points left the school in 9th place.

With the ida of Joãosinho Trinta, which uncurled from Beija-Flor, the school began to hold first place, with exception of 1996, when they were almost demoted. However, with Dominguinhos do Estácio as singer and the storyline Trevas, luz, a explosão do Universo, Viradouro brought to the avenue beautiful play colors, contrasting black and white, dark and light. One of the highlights of this parade was that the drums played "paradinha" with some bars in a funk rhythm, under the direction of Maestro Jorjão.

In August 2005, the school lost its president, bicheiro José Carlos Monassa Bessil, who died from a hemorrhage resulting from a stomach ulcer. Marco Lira was elected as his successor, who put all of his chips on the modern Paulo Barros to bring the plot "The Viradouro turns the game", trying to return to the title they had not won in 10 years. One aspect of this parade was the drums. The drums were on top of a float, a large chess board conducted by Maestro Ciça, placing Juliana Paes in front as queen of the drums, who descended from the car in the middle of the avenue.

In 2008, the school continued with the talent of Paulo Barros and the plot "É de Arrepiar!" who spoke of various sensations perceived by the human being, that would make you shudder, such as cold, sexual pleasure, emotion in general, fear, disgust and repugnance to evil. For both, the club changed its interpreter and one of the floats, which would represent the victims of the Holocaust, was banned by the justice after an action brought by Jewish groups, who considered the car offensive. Outraged, the carnavalesco argued that history could not be censored, and samba would be no less worthy to tell a real story than were films such as Schindler's List. With the ban, all the sculptures were destroyed, and the float passed, covered, through the parade.

With the departure of Paulo Barros the school was lost. It suffered a demotion in the year 2010 with a tribute to Mexico, a parade of dubious level done by Júnior Schall and Edson Pereira. However in this parade had a controversy with the choice of the queen of battery: Julia Lira, only 7 years old, the daughter of Marco Lira. There was criticism of this choice, since the position of queen of battery is usually occupied by women seen as sex symbols.

After 3 years in Grupo de acesso the school returned to the special with a tribute to their city. However, the return among the elite of the samba did not go well and was badly hampered by rain. In preparation for the A Series dispute in 2016, Viradouro bet on a strong team to try to return to the Special Group. For the drums they brought Paulinho Botelho, in the composition of the couple of Maestro Sala and Porte Bandeira, the experienced Marquinhos and Giovanna and a pair to choreograph the front committee, Sylvio Lemgruber and Fernanda Misailidis, with Wilsinho, as director of carnival. With a beautiful parade, the club won 3rd place.

In 2018, the Viradouro school scored yet another victory in the A Series championship and thus secured once more its place in the Special Group in the 2019 parade, ending its campaign with a runner-up finish. One year later, Viradouro won the championship.

== Classifications ==
Year	Place	Division	Plot	Carnivals Producers
Year	Place	Division	Plot	Singers
1949	Champion	Grupo Especial	Arariboia	
1950	Champion	Grupo Especial	Tiradentes - Mártir da Independência	
1952	Champion	Grupo Especial	Vultos Nacionais	
1953	Champion	Grupo Especial	Cândido Rondon	
1954	Contest cancelled		Estado do Rio	
1955	Vice Champion	Grupo Especial	Batalha Naval do Riachuelo	
1956	Champion	Grupo Especial	Independência do Brasil	
1957	Champion	Grupo Especial	Quatro grandes feitos da História	
1958	Champion	Grupo Especial	Primeiro Reinado	
1959	Champion	Grupo Especial	Carlos Gomes	
1960	3rd place	Grupo Especial	Catulo da Paixão Cearense	
1961	Not competed		Festa junina em pleno carnaval	
1962	Champion	Grupo Especial	A Chegada da Família Real	
1963	Champion	Grupo Especial	O Último baile imperial	
1964	Did not parade		Maria Quitéria	
1965	26th place	Grupo 3	Rio Quarto Centenário	
1966	Honorable mention		Homenagem a Niterói	
1967	Vice Champion	Grupo Especial	Chico Rei	
1968	Vice Champion	Grupo Especial	Rugendas - viagem pitoresca através do Brasil	
1969	Vice Champion	Grupo Especial	A Festa do Divino	
1970	Vice-Champion	Grupo Especial	Quilombo dos Palmares	
1971	Champion	Grupo Especial	São Francisco - rio da integração nacional	
1972	Vice Champion	Grupo Especial	Três festas tradicionais brasileiras	
1973	Champion	Grupo Especial	Niterói - sua origem e evolução	
1974	Champion	Grupo Especial	Pleito de vassalagem de Olorum	
1975	Vice Champion	Grupo Especial	Rei Midas de Catas Altas	
1976	3rd place	Grupo Especial	Só mesmo na Bahia	
1977	3rd place	Grupo Especial	No mundo encantado da fantasia	
1978	Vice Champion	Grupo Especial	Ídolos de Ébano	
1979	Vice Champion	Grupo Especial	Ainda um paraíso tropical	
1980	Champion	Grupo Especial	Os três encantos do rei	Yarema Ostrog; Hilda Perna; Adriano Jorge
1980	Champion	Grupo Especial	Os três encantos do rei	Silvinho da Portela
1981	Champion	Grupo Especial	Amor em Tom Maior	Yarema Ostrog; Hilda Perna; Adriano Jorge
1981	Champion	Grupo Especial	Amor em Tom Maior	Silvinho da Portela
1982	Champion	Grupo Especial	Mutou Muido Kitoko	Yarema Ostrog; Hilda Perna; Adriano Jorge
1982	Champion	Grupo Especial	Mutou Muido Kitoko	Silvinho da Portela
1983	Champion	Grupo Especial	Acredite se quiser	Yarema Ostrog; Hilda Perna; Adriano Jorge
1983	Champion	Grupo Especial	Acredite se quiser	Silvinho da Portela
1984	Champion	Grupo Especial	O sonho de Ilê Yfé	Yarema Ostrog; Hilda Perna; Adriano Jorge
1984	Champion	Grupo Especial	O sonho de Ilê Yfé	Silvinho da Portela
1985	Vice Champion	Grupo Especial	Na terra de Antônio Maris, só não viu quem não quis	Yarema Ostrog; Hilda Perna; Adriano Jorge
1985	Vice Champion	Grupo Especial	Na terra de Antônio Maris, só não viu quem não quis	Lula da Mangueira
1986	Appraisal		Novos ventos, novos tempos - História de uma integração	Yarema Ostrog; Hilda Perna; Adriano Jorge
1986	Appraisal		Novos ventos, novos tempos - História de uma integração	Torino
1987	5th place	Grupo 4	Na Boca e na Ponta da Língua ... É carnaval	Rodney Lucas; Alexandre Louzada
1987	5th place	Grupo 4	Na Boca e na Ponta da Língua ... É carnaval	Torino
1988	Vice Champion	Grupo 4	Contribuição do Negro ao Folclore Brasileiro	Rodney Lucas
1988	Vice Champion	Grupo 4	Contribuição do Negro ao Folclore Brasileiro	Torino
1989	Champion	Grupo 3	Mercadores e Mascates	Rodney Lucas
1989	Champion	Grupo 3	Mercadores e Mascates	Torino
1990	Champion	Grupo 1	Só vale o escrito	Max Lopes
1990	Champion	Grupo 1	Só vale o escrito	Torino
1991	7th place	Grupo Especial	Bravo! Bravíssimo! - Dercy Gonçalves, o retrato de um povo	Max Lopes
1991	7th place	Grupo Especial	Bravo! Bravíssimo! - Dercy Gonçalves, o retrato de um povo	Quinzinho
1992	9th place	Grupo Especial	E a magia da sorte chegou	Max Lopes
1992	9th place	Grupo Especial	E a magia da sorte chegou	Quinzinho
1993	7th place	Grupo Especial	Amor, sublime amor	Max Lopes
1993	7th place	Grupo Especial	Amor, sublime amor	Quinzinho
1994	3rd place	Grupo Especial	Tereza de Benguela - Uma rainha negra no Pantanal	Joãosinho Trinta
1994	3rd place	Grupo Especial	Tereza de Benguela - Uma rainha negra no Pantanal	Rico Medeiros
1995	8th place	Grupo Especial	O rei e os três espantos de Debret	Joãosinho Trinta
1995	8th place	Grupo Especial	O rei e os três espantos de Debret	Rico Medeiros
1996	13th place	Grupo Especial	Aquarela do Brasil ano 2000	Joãosinho Trinta
1996	13th place	Grupo Especial	Aquarela do Brasil ano 2000	Nêgo Martins
1997	Champion	Grupo Especial	Trevas! Luz! A explosão do universo	Joãosinho Trinta
1997	Champion	Grupo Especial	Trevas! Luz! A explosão do universo	Dominguinhos do Estácio
1998	5th place	Grupo Especial	Orféu, o negro do carnaval	Joãosinho Trinta
1998	5th place	Grupo Especial	Orféu, o negro do carnaval	Dominguinhos do Estácio
1999	3rd place	Grupo Especial	Anita Garibaldi - Heroína das sete magias	Joãosinho Trinta
1999	3rd place	Grupo Especial	Anita Garibaldi - Heroína das sete magias	Dominguinhos do Estácio
2000	3rd place	Grupo Especial	Brasil: visões de paraísos e infernos	Joãosinho Trinta
2000	3rd place	Grupo Especial	Brasil: visões de paraísos e infernos	Dominguinhos do Estácio
2001	5th place	Grupo Especial	Os sete pecados capitais	Lane Santana
2001	5th place	Grupo Especial	Os sete pecados capitais	Dominguinhos do Estácio
2002	5th place	Grupo Especial	Viradouro, Vira-Mundo, Rei do Mundo	Chico Spinoza
2002	5th place	Grupo Especial	Viradouro, Vira-Mundo, Rei do Mundo	Dominguinhos do Estácio
2003	6th place	Grupo Especial	A Viradouro canta e conta Bibi, uma homenagem ao teatro brasileiro	Mauro Quintaes
2003	6th place	Grupo Especial	A Viradouro canta e conta Bibi, uma homenagem ao teatro brasileiro	Dominguinhos do Estácio
2004	4th place	Grupo Especial	Pediu Pra Pará, Parou! Com a Viradouro Eu Vou... Pro Círio de Nazaré	Mauro Quintaes
2004	4th place	Grupo Especial	Pediu Pra Pará, Parou! Com a Viradouro Eu Vou... Pro Círio de Nazaré	Dominguinhos do Estácio
2005	8th place	Grupo Especial	A Viradouro é só sorriso!	Mauro Quintaes
2005	8th place	Grupo Especial	A Viradouro é só sorriso!	Dominguinhos do Estácio
2006	3rd place	Grupo Especial	Arquitetando Folias	Milton Cunha; Mário Monteiro; Kaká Monteiro
2006	3rd place	Grupo Especial	Arquitetando Folias	Dominguinhos do Estácio
2007	5th place	Grupo Especial	A Viradouro vira o Jogo	Paulo Barros
2007	5th place	Grupo Especial	A Viradouro vira o Jogo	Dominguinhos do Estácio
2008	7th place	Grupo Especial	É de arrepiar	Paulo Barros
2008	7th place	Grupo Especial	É de arrepiar	Nêgo
2009	8th place	Grupo Especial	Vira-Bahia, pura energia	Milton Cunha
2009	8th place	Grupo Especial	Vira-Bahia, pura energia	David do Pandeiro
2010	12th place	Grupo Especial	México, o Paraíso das Cores, sob o Signo do Sol	Júnior Schall; Edson Pereira
2010	12th place	Grupo Especial	México, o Paraíso das Cores, sob o Signo do Sol	Wander Pires
2011	2nd place	Grupo A	Quem Sou Eu Sem Você?	Jack Vasconcelos
2011	2nd place	Grupo A	Quem Sou Eu Sem Você?	Silas Leleu; Diego Nicolau; Gilberto Gomes; Niu Souza
2012	5th place	Grupo A	A Vida Como Ela é, Bonita mas Ordinária... Assim Falou Nelson Rodrigues	Alexandre Louzada
2012	5th place	Grupo A	A Vida Como Ela é, Bonita mas Ordinária... Assim Falou Nelson Rodrigues	Silas Leleu; Diego Nicolau; Gilberto Gomes; Niu Souza
2013	2nd place	Série A	Nem melhor nem pior, que não sai da minha mente. Inspiração para o meu samba, eu também sou diferente	Max Lopes
2013	2nd place	Série A	Nem melhor nem pior, que não sai da minha mente. Inspiração para o meu samba, eu também sou diferente	Diego Nicolau; Gilberto Gomes; Niu Souza; David do Pandeiro
2014	Champion	Série A	Sou a Terra de Ismael, 'Guanabaran' eu vou Cruzar... Pra Você Tiro o Chapéu, Rio eu vim te Abraçar	João Vítor Araújo
2014	Champion	Série A	Sou a Terra de Ismael, 'Guanabaran' eu vou Cruzar... Pra Você Tiro o Chapéu, Rio eu vim te Abraçar	Zé Paulo Sierra
2015	11th place	Grupo Especial	Nas veias do Brasil, é a Viradouro em um dia de graça	João Vítor Araújo
2015	11th place	Grupo Especial	Nas veias do Brasil, é a Viradouro em um dia de graça	Zé Paulo Sierra
2016	3rd place	Série A	O Alabê de Jerusalém, a saga de Ogundana!	Max Lopes
2016	3rd place	Série A	O Alabê de Jerusalém, a saga de Ogundana!	Zé Paulo Sierra
2017	2nd place	Série A	E todo menino é um Rei	Jorge Silveira
2017	2nd place	Série A	E todo menino é um Rei	Zé Paulo Sierra
2018	Champion	Série A	Vira a cabeça pira o coração. Loucos gênios da criação	Edson Pereira
2018	Champion	Série A	Vira a cabeça pira o coração. Loucos gênios da criação	Zé Paulo Sierra
2019	Vice Champion	Grupo Especial	ViraViradouro	Paulo Barros
2019	Vice Champion	Grupo Especial	ViraViradouro	Zé Paulo Sierra
2020	Champion	Grupo Especial	Viradouro de alma lavada	Marcus Ferreira; Tarcísio Zanon
2020	Champion	Grupo Especial	Viradouro de alma lavada	Zé Paulo Sierra
2022	3rd place	Grupo Especial	Não há tristeza que possa suportar tanta alegria	Marcus Ferreira; Tarcísio Zanon
2022	3rd place	Grupo Especial	Não há tristeza que possa suportar tanta alegria	Zé Paulo Sierra
2023	Vice Champion	Grupo Especial	Rosa Maria Egipcíaca	Tarcísio Zanon
2023	Vice Champion	Grupo Especial	Rosa Maria Egipcíaca	Zé Paulo Sierra
2024	Champion	Grupo Especial	Arroboboi, Dangbé	Tarcísio Zanon
2024	Champion	Grupo Especial	Arroboboi, Dangbé	Wander Pires
2025	4rd place	Grupo Especial	Malunguinho: O Mensageiro de Três Mundos	Tarcísio Zanon
2025	4rd place	Grupo Especial	Malunguinho: O Mensageiro de Três Mundos	Wander Pires
2026	Champion	Grupo Especial	Pra Cima, Ciça!	Tarcísio Zanon
2026	Champion	Grupo Especial	Pra Cima, Ciça!	Wander Pires
