= Messias Donato =

Brazilian politician (born 1976)

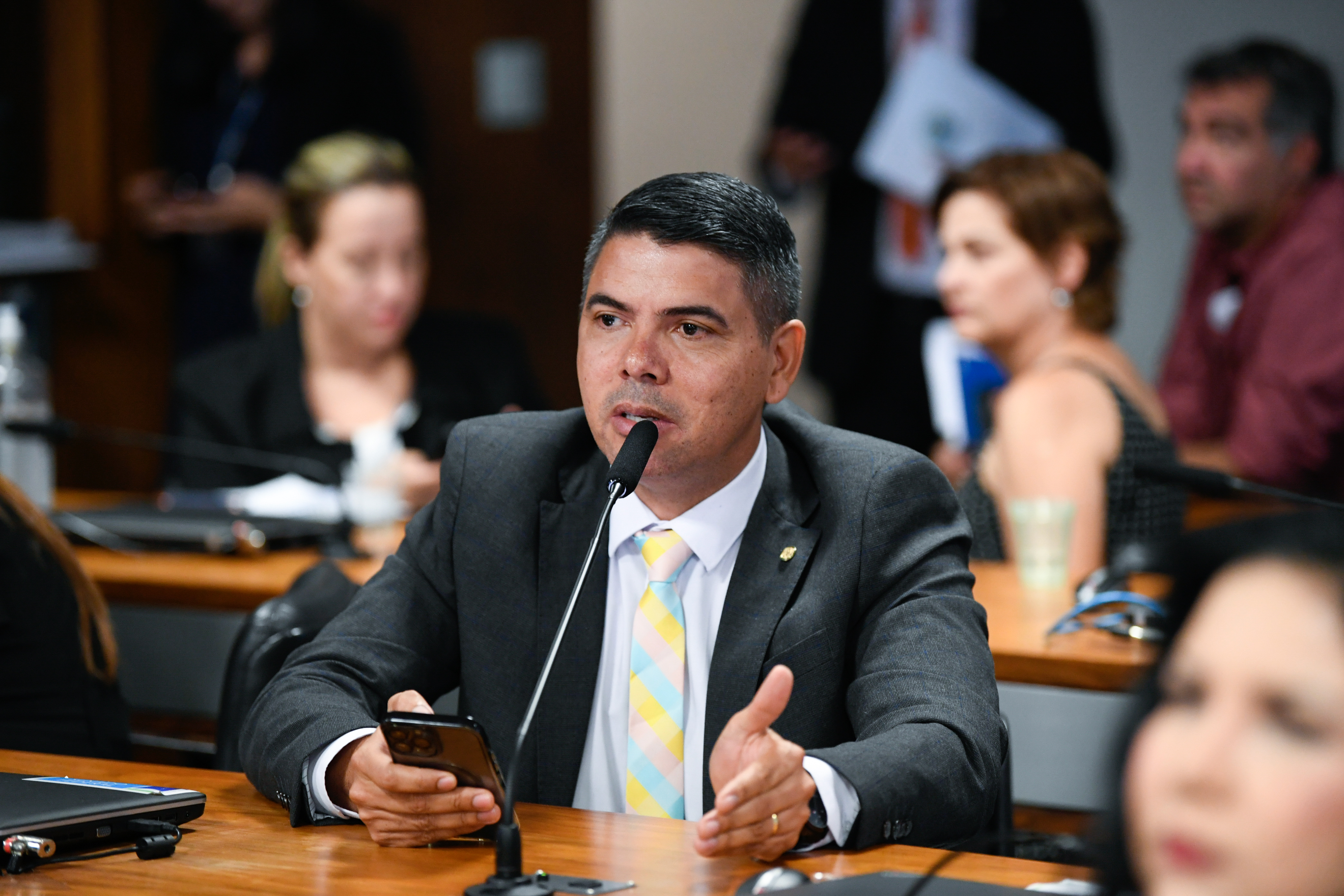
- Donato in 2023

Member of the Chamber of Deputies
- Incumbent
- Assumed office 1 February 2023
- Constituency: Espírito Santo

Personal details
- Born: 6 August 1976 (age 50) Itororó (BA)
- Party: Brazil Union (since 2026)
- Other political affiliations: REP (2022–2026)
- Profession: Pastor, Politician

Manoel Messias Donato Bezerra (born 6 August 1976) is a Brazilian politician serving as a member of the Chamber of Deputies since 2023. From 2021 to 2022, he served as secretary of health and education and secretary of government of Cariacica.

In March 2026 he changed the party to the Uniao.

He is an evangelical pastor of the Foursquare Gospel Church, a denomination he joined at the age of 12.
