= Paulo Barros =

Paulo Barros may refer to:

- Paulo Barros (born 1963), Portuguese musician, member of Tarantula (band)
- Paulo Barros (carnival planner) (born 1962), Brazilian carnavalesco
- Paulo Barros (basketball) (born 1989), Angolan basketball player
