= Vila Isabel =

- Neighbourhood
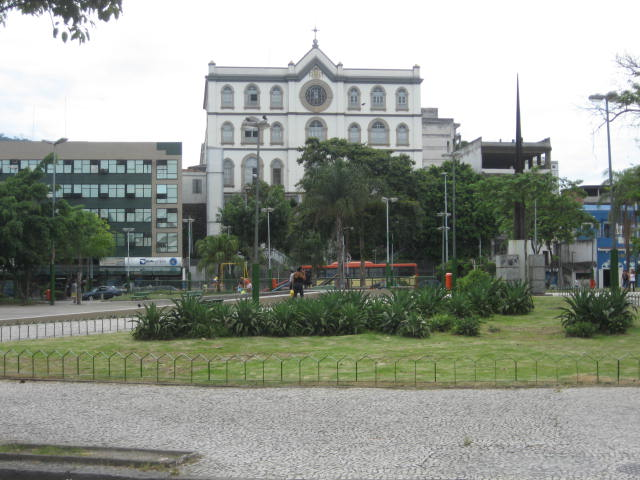
- View of Praça Barão de Drummond

- Location in Rio de Janeiro Vila Isabel (Brazil)
- Coordinates: 22°54′56″S 43°14′55″W
- Country: Brazil
- State: Rio de Janeiro (RJ)
- Municipality/City: Rio de Janeiro
- Zone: North Zone
- Established: 1872

Population (2022)
  - Total: 65,790

Vila Isabel is a middle-class neighbourhood in the North Zone of Rio de Janeiro, Brazil. Known for being one of the cradles of samba in Brazil, it is located in the subprefecture of Grande Tijuca. Its music-themed Boulevard 28 de Setembro (pt) celebrates the neighbourhood's long musical heritage. The neighbourhood was named in honour of Brazilian Princess Isabel, renowned for abolishing slavery in Brazil. It is home to Unidos de Vila Isabel, one of the most traditional samba schools in Rio de Janeiro.

Vila Isabel is surrounded by the neighbourhoods of Grajaú to the west; Maracanã to the east; Andaraí and Tijuca to the south; and Engenho Novo to the north, from which it is separated by the Serra do Engenho Novo. The total population of Vila Isabel was 65,790 in 2022. According to the 2010 census, the total population was 86,018 inhabitants (female 47,915 and male 38,103), but according to the 2022 census the population has diminished with 20,228.

The area includes the favela Morro dos Macacos, which together with the Parque Vila Isabel and Pau da Bandeira favelas, forms the so-called Complexo dos Macacos or Terreirinho.

== History ==
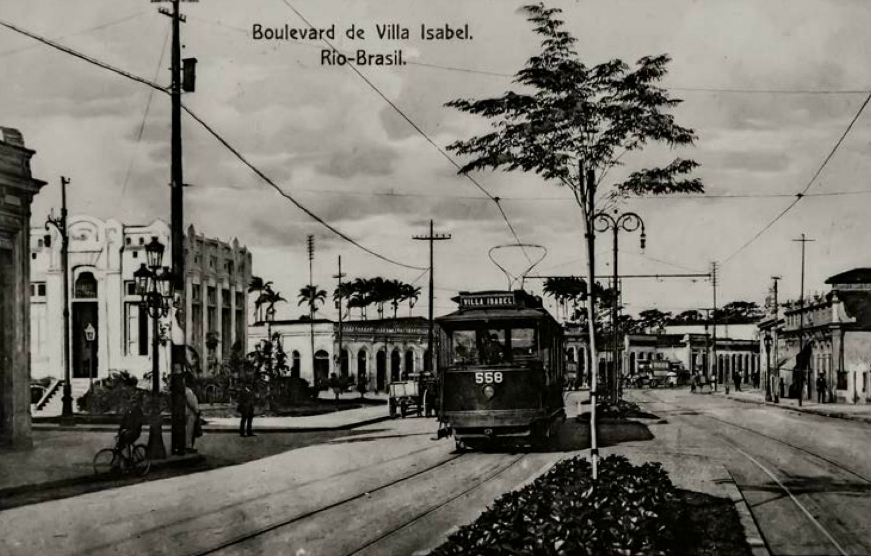
Electrical tram on the Boulevard 28 de Setembro

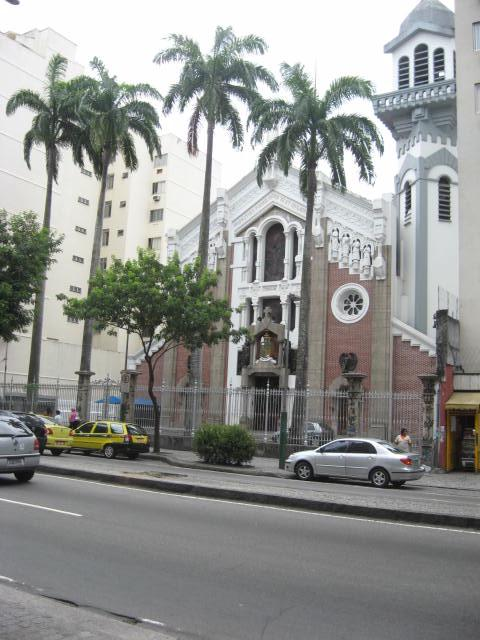
Basílica Nossa Senhora de Lourdes

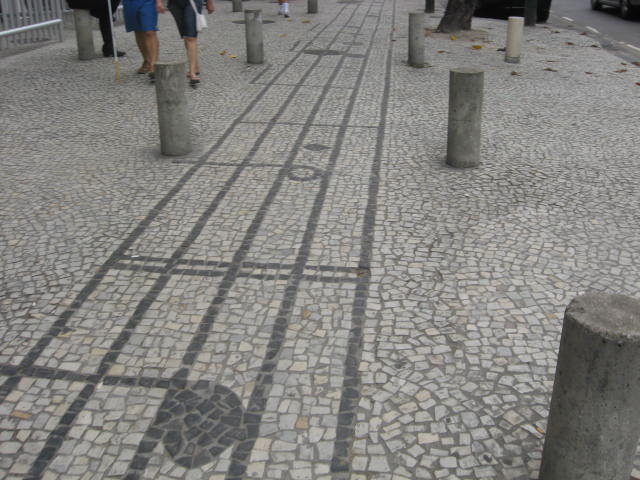
Musical promenade on Boulevard 28 de Setembro

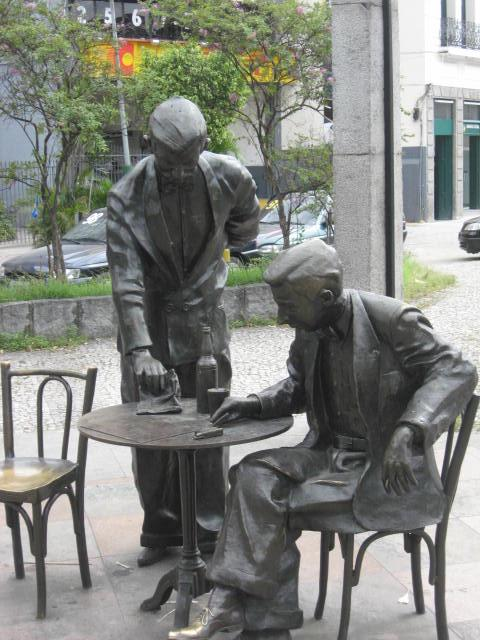
Statue of Noel Rosa sitting at a bar table

The neighbourhood arose from the entrepreneurial spirit of João Batista Viana Drummond, the future Baron of Drummond, a progressive businessman who combined operating a transport company with real estate development. In 1872, Drummond acquired both a concession for a horse-drawn tramway line, the Companhia Ferro-Carril de Vila Isabel, and the lands of the Imperial Quinta do Macaco, better known as the Fazendo dos Macacos, owned by Empress Amélia, following the enactment of the Law of Free Birth (Lei do Ventre Livre) in 1871, the first timid step toward abolition of slavery in Brazil. Vila Isabel was the first planned neighbourhood in Rio de Janeiro.

The district was officially founded on 3 January 1872, inspired by Parisian urbanism. The first line of the tramway ran from the centre of Rio de Janeiro to the gate of the Fazenda dos Macacos, and was inaugurated in 1873. The first journeys were free, with the aim of introducing potential buyers to the new neighbourhood. To urbanise and subdivide it, Drummond organised the Companhia Arquitetônica de Vila Isabel (Vila Isabel Architectural Company) in 1873, hiring architect Francisco Joaquim Béthencourt da Silva, a disciple of Grandjean de Montigny. The former estate was crossed by two old roads, Macaco and Cabuçu, which became Boulevard 28 de Setembro and Rua Barão do Bom Retiro respectively.

Sanitation and hygiene, coupled with progress, were the constant topic in Rio at the time, and Vila Isabel, with its flourishing farms and fruit trees, was a modern and pleasant neighbourhood hailed as charming and elegant. In 1873, land sales began and the first buildings were built on the site of the old farm. An abolitionist and friend of prominent figures who shared his political ideals, Drummond gave the streets and squares of the development names and dates alluding to the cause. The very name of the neighbourhood was a tribute to Princess Isabel and its main thoroughfare, Boulevard 28 de Setembro, is a tribute to the date on which the Law of Free Birth was sanctioned.

The neighbourhood hosted the first Rio de Janeiro Zoological Garden that opened in July 1888, and which was the birth place of the popular illegal gambling game, the jogo do bicho. (The Vila Isabel zoo closed its doors in the 1940s. It was relocated to Quinta da Boa Vista, in March 1945.) In 1909, the neighbourhood had its first electric light, and the Vila Isabel Tram Station (Estação de Bondes de Vila Isabel) was inaugurated with electric traction.

The neighbourhood was once home to the Fábrica de Tecidos Confiança, a textile factory located in Aldeia Campista, between Vila Isabel and Andaraí, constructed there in 1885, which pulled workers into the neighbourhood and the construction of working-class housing for over a thousand residents. The former factory was transformed into a supermarket in 1979. By the 1890s, this swathe of former farmland west of Rio’s historical center had become the fastest growing part of the city. In the case of Vila Isabel, possibly as a result of the construction of working-class areas near the factories, favelas only appeared in 1921, with Morro dos Macacos in the Serra do Engenho Novo.

The Boulevard 28 de Setembro, which runs from Rua São Francisco Xavier to Praça Barão de Drummond (former Praça Sete de Março), is the main axis of the neighbourhood. In the middle of the boulevard, there is the mother church of Vila Isabel, the Basilica of Our Lady of Lourdes (Basílica Nossa Senhora de Lourdes), a national monument and one of the most beautiful in Rio de Janeiro.

In the 1920s, the neighbourhood became a meeting place for samba musicians and bohemians, such as Noel Rosa, Braguinha, Orestes Barbosa, Almirante (compositor), Henrique Brito and the famous Bando de Tangarás and acquired a reputation as a bohemian neighbourhood. Noel Rosa has a statue of him seated at a cafe table on the Boulevard 28 de Setembro. In 1964, to commemorate that bohemian heyday, the sidewalks of the Boulevard 28 de Setembro were resurfaced with black and white Portuguese cobble stones, and decorate them with musical notes from Brazilian popular music, the names of their authors and musical instruments. Today the sidewalks are known as the "Calçadas Musicais de Vila Isabel".

In the 1970s, the neighbourhood was seen as having residential real estate potential, as there was a scarcity of land in both the South Zone and Tijuca, as well as an increase in property prices. Even with this attention from the property market many of the buildings constructed in the first decade of the century remained. In the same decade, the favela population in the neighbourhood increased.

Recently, Vila Isabel is losing substantial amounts of inhabitants. According to the 2022 census the population has diminished with 20,228, almost 24 per cent. The main reasons why people are leaving are the issue of public security and the decline in the number of families in recent decades, causing people to look for smaller homes in other areas. Another factor is the price of the condominium; many of the buildings are old and therefore have higher maintenance costs.

The feeling of insecurity in the area stems mainly from armed conflict for control of the favelas between criminal gangs such as the Comando Vermelho (CV), Amigos dos Amigos (ADA) and Terceiro Comando Puro (TCP). In October 2009, for instance, a police helicopter flying over Morro dos Macacos community was shot down, killing three police officers, after police launched an operation in the area to control heavy fighting between the CV and ADA. In May 2022, an armed conflict between the CV and TCP over the control over the Morro dos Macacos lasted for eight days. In 2024, attempts by CV bandits to invade the community intensified; at least 79 gunfights were recorded in Vila Isabel, most of which were caused by the war between rival gangs, and the samba school had to cancel street rehearsals for carnival.

== Places of interest ==
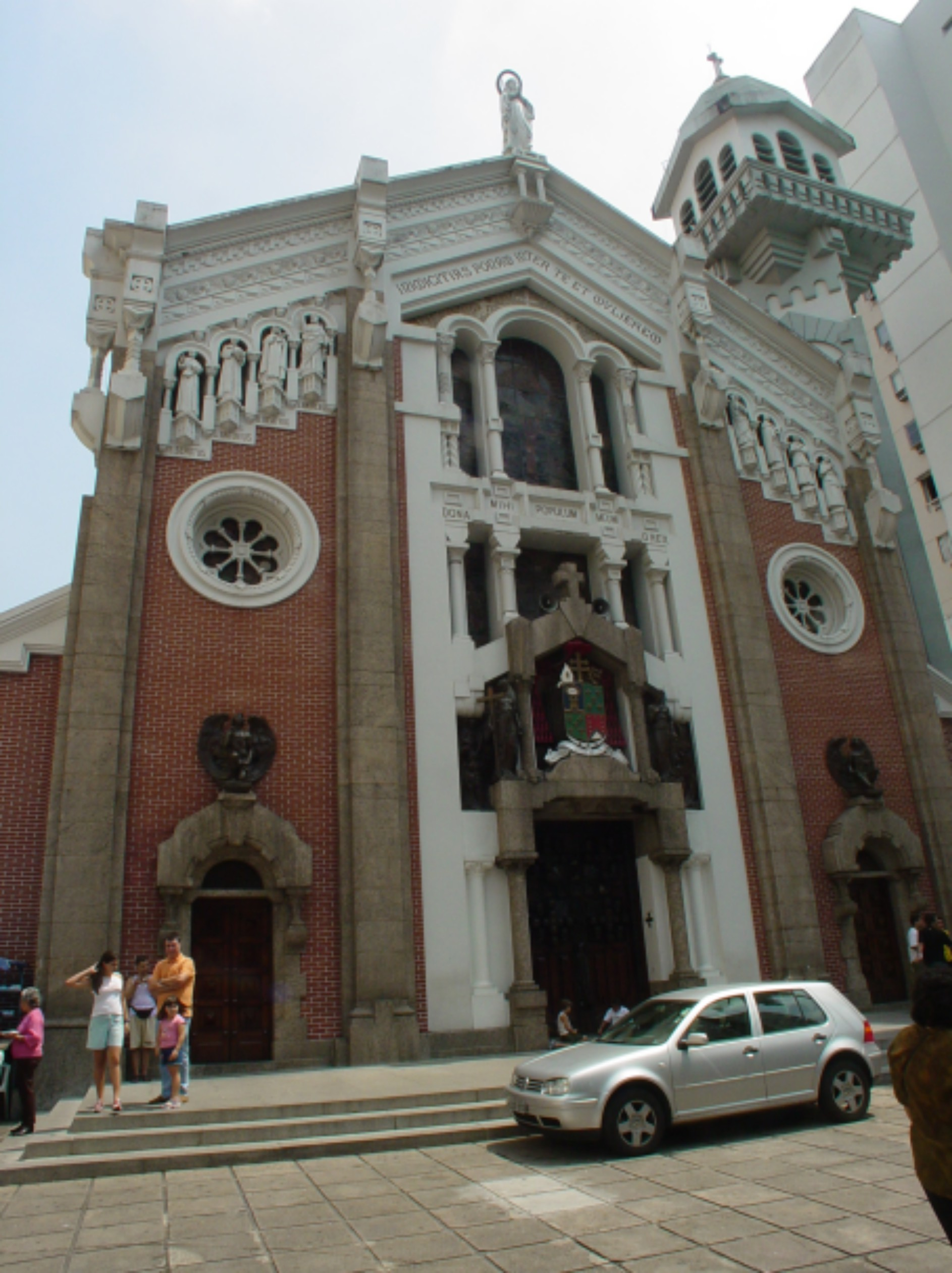
Basilica of Our Lady of Lourdes

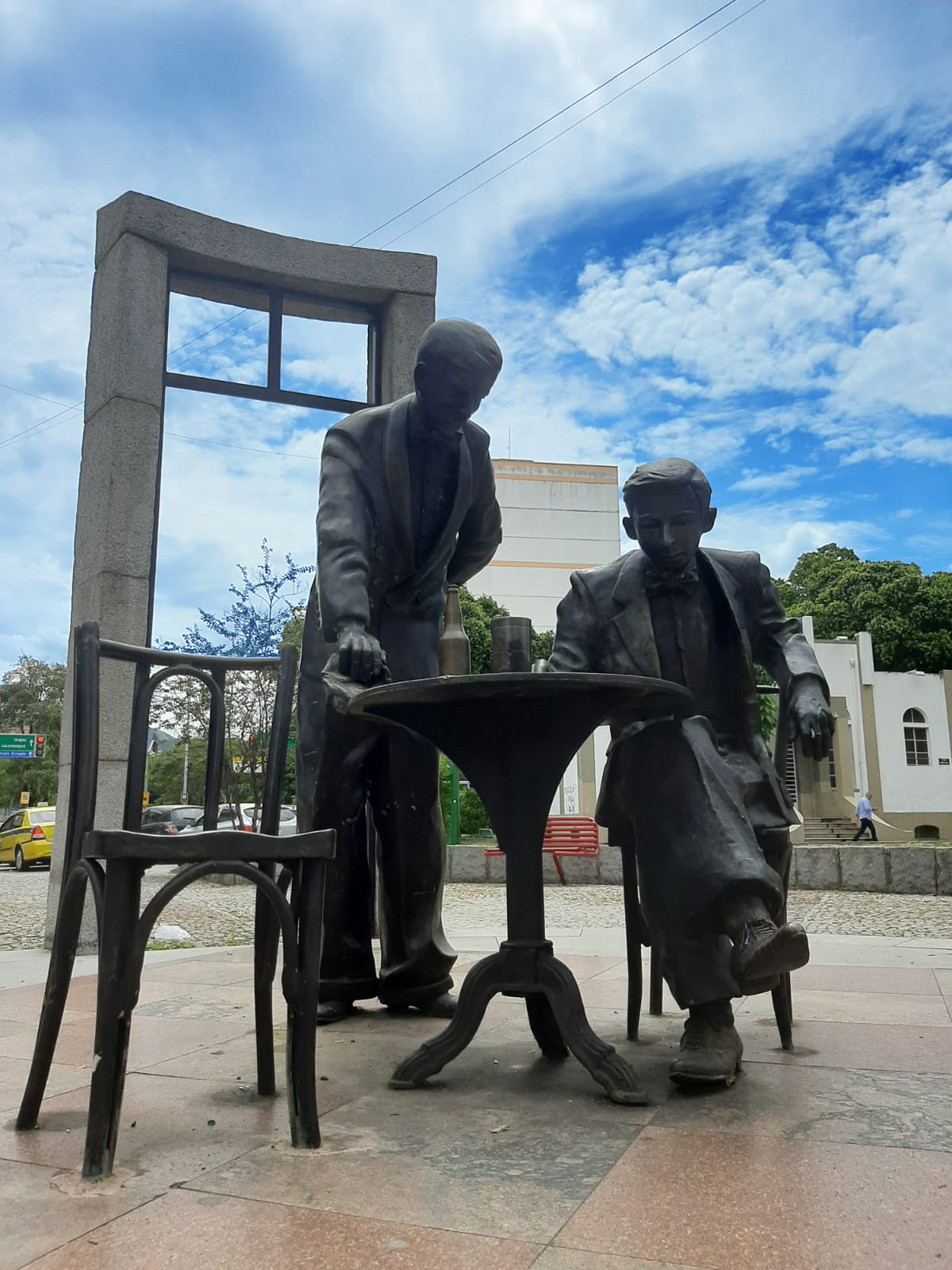
Statue of Noel Rosa

Basilica of Our Lady of Lourdes (Basílica Nossa Senhora de Lourdes), on Boulevard 28 de Setembro, 200.
The Basilica is the mother church of Vila Isabel, a national monument and one of the most beautiful in Rio de Janeiro. The foundation stone was laid on 20 December 1914. Work began in 1919 and only finished in 1943 with the construction of the bell tower. The internal works were completed in 1958. It was designed by the Italian architect Antonio Virzi (1882-1954). The eclectic façade innovatively combines historical elements from Lombard churches and Italian architecture. The bold spatiality of the interior is remarkable and the high altar is shaped like the Massabielle grotto in Lourdes, where the Virgin Mary appeared.

Calçadas Musicais (Musical Sidewalks), Boulevard 28 de Setembro from Largo do Maracanã to Praça Barão de Drummond.
In 1964, in preparation for the Fourth Centenary of Rio de Janeiro in 1965, architect Orlando Madalena, a resident of the neighbourhood, presented a project to resurface the pavement the sidewalks of the Boulevard 28 de Setembro with black and white Portuguese cobble stones, to honour Brazilian musicians, the names of their authors and musical instruments. The popular Brazilian singer, songwriter and radio broadcaster Almirante (compositor) chose the themes and songs. The first section, in front of the República Argentina Municipal School, has as its theme the song 'A voz do violão' (The guitar's voice), by Chico Viola, and was inaugurated in August 1964. Written in the stones are 20 complete musical works, including tunes by Ary Barroso, Martinho da Vila, Almirante himself, Noel Rosa, and other famous Brazilian composers who frequented Vila Isabel back in its Bohemian heyday.

Statue of Noel Rosa, on Largo do Maracanã/Boulevard 28 de Setembro.
The set of sculptures depicts the singer-songwriter Noel Rosa (1910–1937), born in Vila Isabel and an iconic symbol of the renewal of the samba, sitting at a bar table, smoking a cigarette, drinking beer and being served by a waiter “as if [Noel] were composing with a matchbox.” Next to him is an empty chair where visitors can sit and take photos. The composition in bronze by Joás Pereira dos Passos is a reference to the samba Conversa de Botequim (Bar Banter), one of Noel's most famous songs. The work was inaugurated in 1996 and is considered Rio’s first interactive monument. Over the years the monument gradually disappeared as it suffered from theft and vandalism multiple times. Parts continued to be stolen: the beer glass, the chair support, the tabletop and even the waiter, of whom only parts of the legs and feet remained. In 2019, the statue was removed and stored in a depot, but on 10 December 2021, at Rosa's 111th birthday, the bronze returned to the square, where he awaits his next companion for some banter.

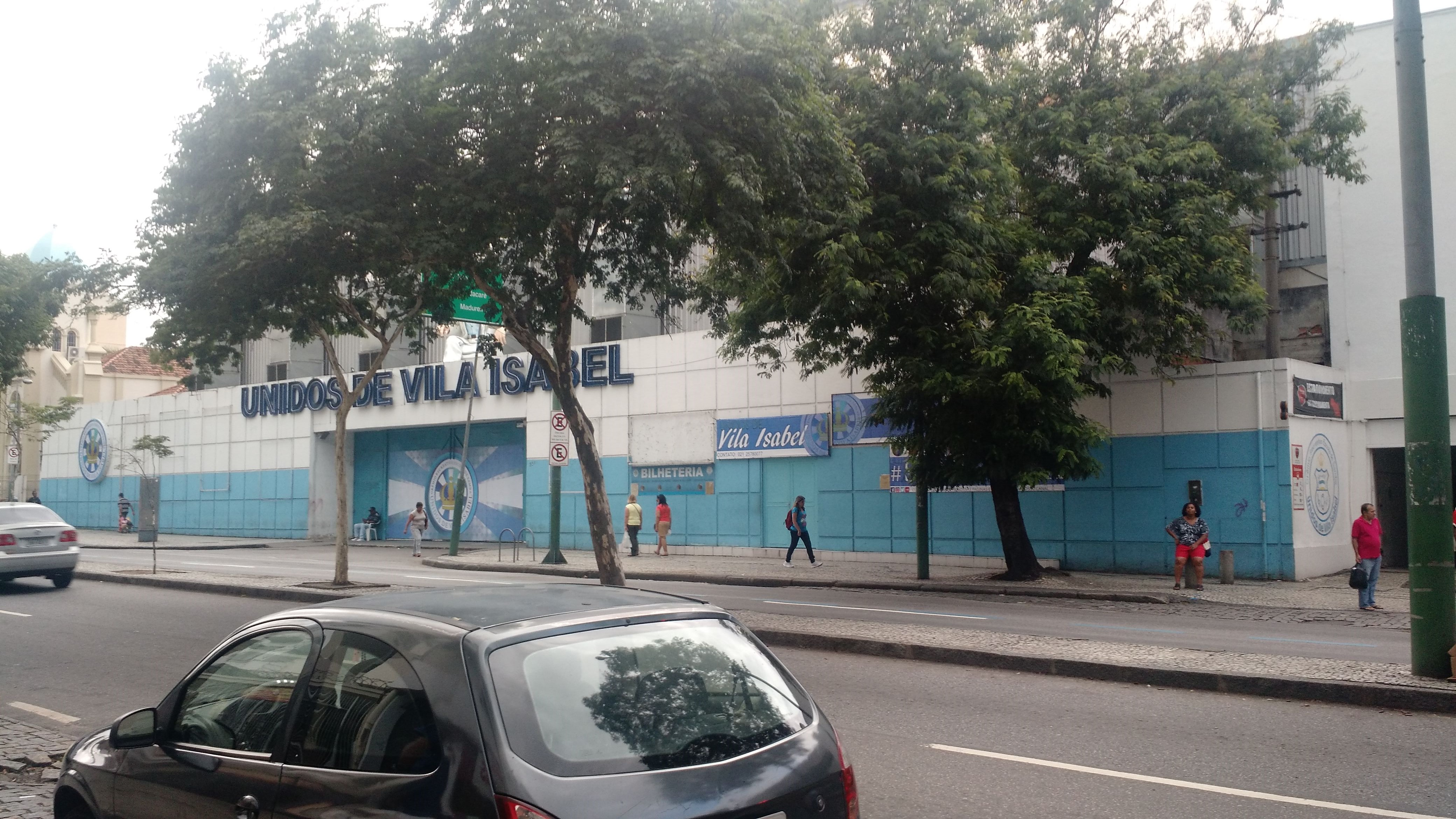
Quadra do Unidos de Vila Isabel in 2018

Quadra do Unidos de Vila Isabel, on Boulevard 28 de Setembro, 382.
The headquarters and practice ground of the major league samba school Unidos de Vila Isabel, founded in 1946 and the winner of the 1988, 2006 and 2013 Rio Carnival, is based in a part of the former garage of the Companhia de Transportes Coletivos. After 53 carnivals, the school finally got its own ground in 1999. There is another statue of Noel Rosa on top of the entrance.

Escola Municipal República Argentina, on Boulevard 28 de Setembro, 125.
Built in the midst of the innovative educational proposals of Anísio Teixeira and the Escola Nova, which in its manifesto advocated for free primary public and secular education for all. This public school, designed by the architect Enéas Trigueiro Silva, and initiated during the term of Rio mayor Pedro Ernesto was inaugurated in 1935. It is one of the most expressive works of the first phase of modernist architecture in Rio, despite some architectural modifications over the years.

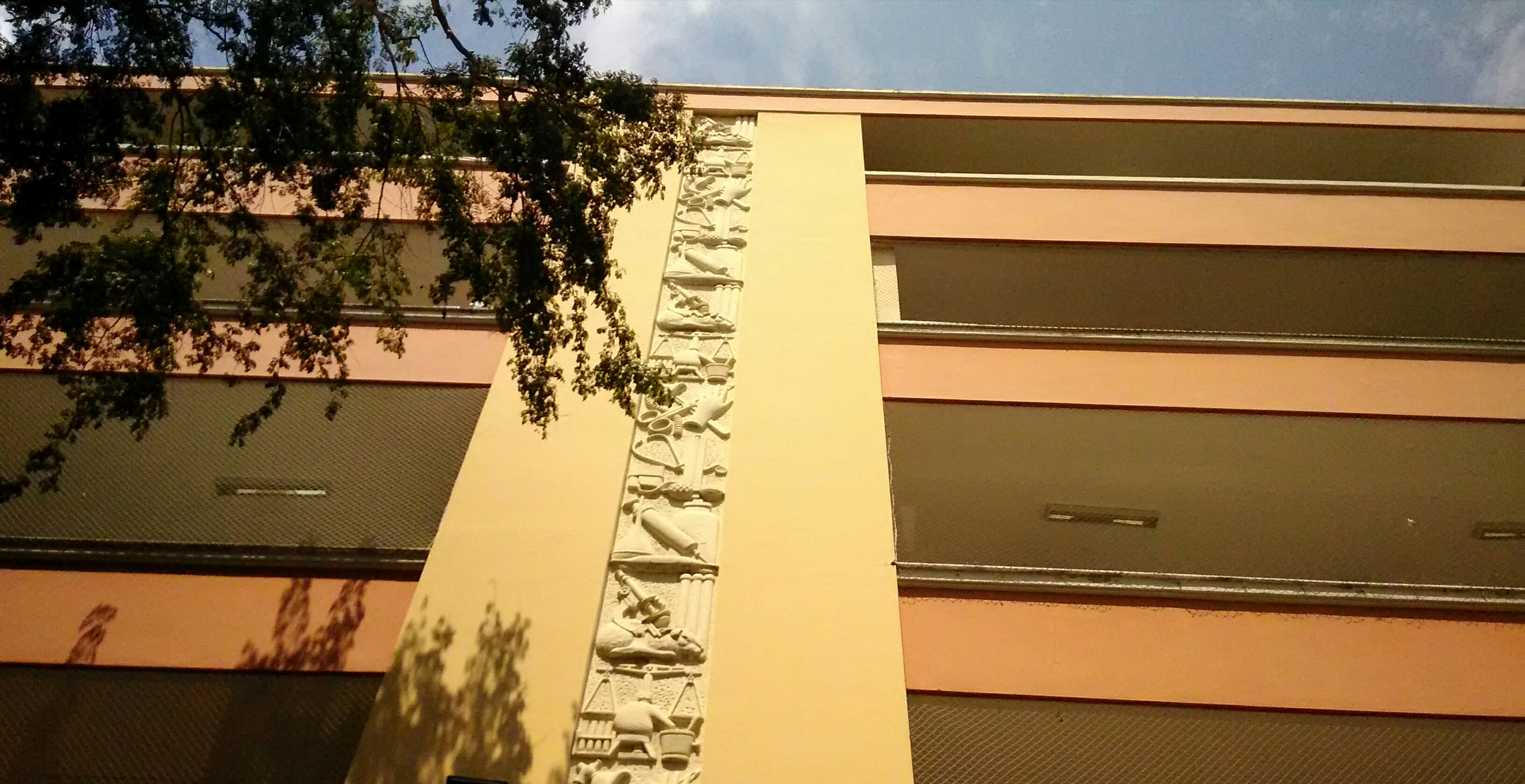
Art deco sculpture on the façade of Pedro Ernesto University Hospital

Pedro Ernesto University Hospital, on Boulevard 28 de setembro, 77.
The Pedro Ernesto University Hospital (Hospital Universitário Pedro Ernesto – HUPE) is the university hospital of the Rio de Janeiro State University (UERJ). It was designed by the French architect Jacques Pilon who mostly worked in São Paulo and inaugurated in 1950 as part of the hospital network of the Health Department. The hospital was named after the medical surgeon Pedro Ernesto, the populist progressive mayor of Rio de Janeiro in the mid-1930s. The hospitals façade has an example of art déco sculpture relating to typical hospital activities.

Convent of Nossa Senhora da Conceição da Ajuda, on Rua Barão de São Francisco, 385.
The Convent of Nossa Senhora da Conceição da Ajuda was built in 1920 and has become a landmark in the Vila Isabel neighbourhood. The construction is related to Rio's urban evolution, specifically the widening of the current Avenida Rio Branco in 1911 and the consequent demolition of the old Convento da Ajuda, built in the 18th century.

== Sources ==
- Andrade, Maria do Carmo (2009). "Jogo do Bicho". Pesquisa Escolar On-Line. Joaquim Nabuco Foundation. Archived from the original on 25 December 2023.
- Bogéa, Henrique; Pires, Marina; Mello, Natasha (2019). Vila Isabel: história e urbanismo na zona norte (Thesis) (in Portuguese). Niteroi RJ: Universidade Federal Fluminense, Escola de Arquitetura e Urbanismo.
- Chazkel, Amy (2011). Laws of Chance: Brazil's Clandestine Lottery and the Making of Urban Public Life. Durham NC/London: Duke University Press. ISBN 978-0-8223-4973-0.
- Maia Fragoso, Dom Mauro; Pires do Nascimento, Igor (2019). "Basílica de Nossa Senhora da Imaculada Conceição de Lourdes: a finalidade religiosa da arte em sua fachada". Revista Coletânea (in Portuguese): 261–282. doi:10.31607/coletanea-v18i36-2019-1. ISSN 1677-7883.
- Perminio Silva, Thaciara Gonçalves (December 2019). Um toque no sagrado: relação simbólica entre devotos e esculturas policromadas sob o olhar da conservação (PDF) (Thesis) (in Portuguese). Rio de Janeiro: Universidade Federal do Rio de Janeiro.
- Piccolo, Fernanda Delvalhas (2009). "Memórias, histórias e representações sociais do bairro de Vila Isabel e de uma de suas favelas (RJ, Brasil)" [Memories, stories and social representations of the district of Vila Isabel and one of its slums (RJ, Brazil)]. Etnográfica (in Portuguese). 13 (1). Universidade de Coimbra: 77–102. doi:10.4000/etnografica.1232.
- Vianna Gaspar, Márcia (June 2003). "Vila de Isabel, Amélia e Drumond". In Mello Santos, Alexandre; Pereira Leite, Márcia; Franca, Nahyda (eds.). Quando memória e história se entrelaçam: A trama dos espaços na Grande Tijuca (PDF) (in Portuguese). Rio de Janeiro: Ibase. pp. 53–61. ISBN 85-89447-01-4.
- Weid, Elisabeth von der (1994). "O bonde como elemento de expansão urbana no Rio de Janeiro" (PDF). Fundação Casa de Rui Barbosa (in Portuguese). Rio de Janeiro.
