= Unidos de Vila Isabel =

Samba school in Rio de Janeiro, Brazil

Vila Isabel
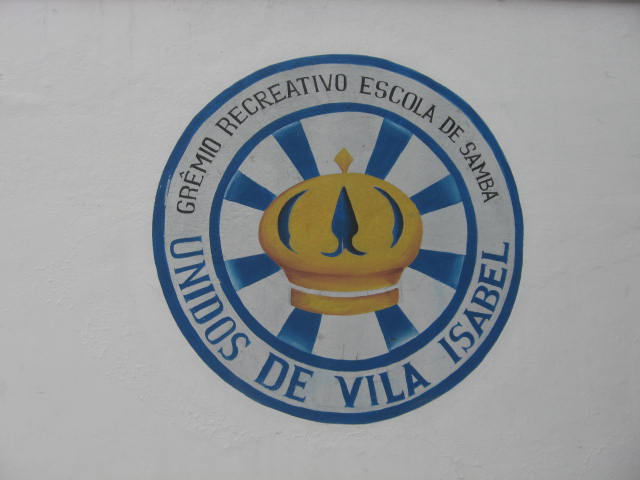

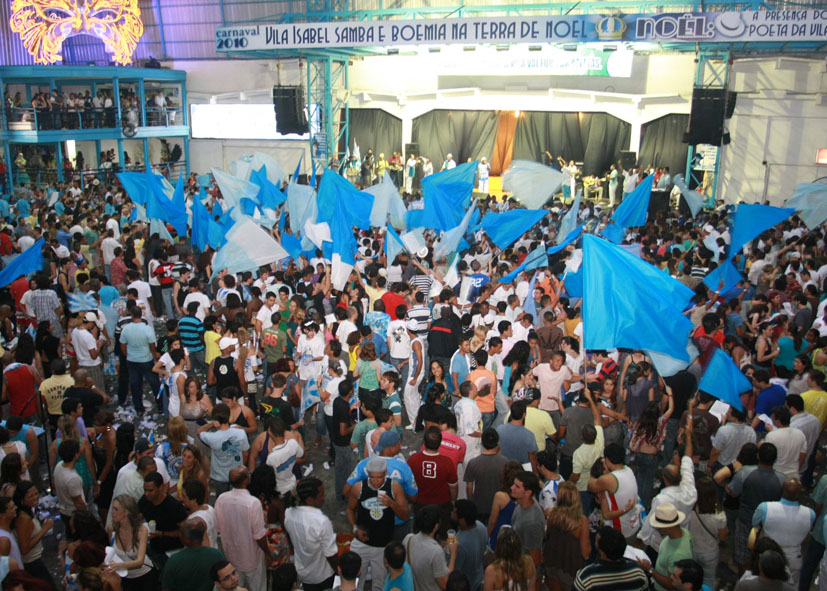
- Festivity at Vila Isabel in 2009
- Full name: Grêmio Recreativo Escola de Samba Unidos de Vila Isabel
- Foundation: April 4, 1946; 79 years ago
- Blessing school: Portela
- Colors
- Symbol: crown
- Location: Vila Isabel
- President: Fernando Fernandes
- Patron: Capitão Guimarães
Carnival staff
- Carnival producer: Edson Pereira
- Carnival singer: Tinga
- Carnival director: Wilsinho Alves; Moisés Carvalho
- Harmony director: Marcelinho Emoção
- Director of Battery: Macaco Branco
- Queen of Battery: Sabrina Sato
- Mestre-sala and Porta-Bandeira: Rafael Rodrigues; Denadir Garcia
- Choreography: Patrick Carvalho

2020 presentation
- Motif: Petrópolis
- Presentation order: 2nd school on Monday
- Tier: Special Group (1st tier)
- Result: 3rd

Website
- unidosdevilaisabel.com.br

Grêmio Recreativo Escola de Samba Unidos de Vila Isabel is a samba school in Rio de Janeiro. It was thrice champion of the Special Group of the Rio Carnival and is currently headquartered in Boulevard 28 de Setembro in the Vila Isabel neighbourhood.

After winning the 1988 and 2006 carnival, the Unidos de Vila Isabel samba school was crowned the winner of the 2013 Rio Carnival for its attractive and colourful parade highlighting rural life and the customs of the Brazilian interior. Vila Isabel obtained 299.7 points out of a maximum score of 300.

== History ==
Football is at the foundation of the 'Vila Isabel', as there was in the neighborhood in 1945, a block known as Red and White. The removal of some components has resulted in the creation of a football team with the colors blue and white, later transformed into a new carnival. Antonio Fernandes da Silveira, the "China", registered the company as the União Geral das Escolas de Samba, thus on April 4 of 1946, the school opened its doors.

The home of "China", the first president of the school, served until 1958 as headquarters of the school. The tests were performed in Field Andaraí. The first plot of the Village, From Slave to Queen, was performed by only 100 members in Onze Square: 27 percussionists, 13 Bahia and another 50 people. Paulo Brazão, one of the founders of the school, was one of the biggest winners of the theme song Vila Isabel. In 1960, the school won first place in Group 3, with the plot Poet of the Slaves.

One of the best known figures of the school is, undoubtedly, Martinho da Vila. His entry into the guild was in 1965; it was part of the Samba School Learners of Boca do Mato and it was off to the Empire Serrano, with an invitation to join the wing of the Vila Isabel composers. In the new school, Martin has restructured the composition of the songs and the plots of the parade yearly, with the introduction of softer lyrics and melodies. In the carnival of 1967, Martinho da Vila composed Carnival of Illusions, in 1968 Four Centuries of Fashion and Costumes, in 1969 Iaiá Cais Gold, and in 1970, Glory Gaúchas.

In 1979, the village was victorious in Group 1B, with a plot made by Yedda Pinheiro, talking about the golden years of Carlos Machado. It was the first time a school honored a major culture still alive. It is commonplace, but this was the first time this was done.

In the special group, Vila Isabel won only their first championship in 1988, with the parade theme song Kizomba, a festa da raça. The parade marked the samba runway, abusing alternative materials such as straw and sisal, and the claw of school members. For many who know the school parades, this was perhaps the best show ever known. Unfortunately, due to a severe storm, which left the city of Rio de Janeiro in a state of emergency, the Parade of Champions was not performed.

After the victory of 1988, the school achieved a good result with Law is law in 1989 (4th place), in a year when the committee was composed of pregnant women. But in the 1990s, the school ranged from 7th to 12th place. In 2000, however, the Vila Isabel was in 13th place, down to the Access Group A. In 2002, with a story about Nilton Santos, the village was prevented from going up to the Special Group by the error of a judge, who gave the village a lower score instead of a 10, which would be given to União da Ilha. Thus, the Acadêmicos de Santa Cruz was champion.

In 2004, with a story about the city of Paraty, the village returned to become champion of the Access Group, beating the favorite Santa Cruz, and scholars of Rocinha. In 2005 with Joãosnho Trinta on the committee, who suffered a stroke and could not continue working, the village brought a story about ships that got 10th place.

After spending years without court trials, Ru, president of the school, arranged for the school hall Ecuador, which lies on Boulevard 28 de Setembro and the street Rocha Fragoso, to relinquish its gymnasium. Currently the school has a block of tests located in the Boulevard, in what was the final season of the tramway, which was the car park and garage Detran, the former CTC.

In 2006, Vila Isabel Avenue used the plot "Soy loco por ti America - The town sings the Latin civilization, with the carnavalesco (carnival planner) Alexandre Louzada, and got his second title, after much suffering in the calculation. With an infectious chorus, the theme song of the Vila Isabel was the one that made the bleachers sing the most, and curiously, was what determined the title. The company PDVSA, Venezuela's state oil company, funded the carnival of Vila Isabel with a donation of $900 thousand. However, according to a report of "Official in Brazil" on March 3, 2006, Venezuelan authorities investigated the sponsorship and its true value, as there are opinions that the amount was between US$450 to $2 million. The Venezuelan morning Report reported on its cover more than 500 people traveled to Rio de Janeiro, with all expenses paid by PDVSA to cheer the parade of Vila Isabel. In 2007, the plot talked about the Metamorphoses, by Cid Carvalho, who debuted a solo career, ending in 6th position.

In the carnival of 2008, talking about the Workers of Brazil, the village had a rich and visually perfect parade. However, a manoeuvre error in the last float affected the school, without reducing the brilliance of the new Queen of battery (Natalia Guimaraes).

In the carnival of 2009, the village spoke about the centenary of the Theatro Municipal do Rio de Janeiro, with the theme In this Stage of Folia, My Village Announces: Municipal Theater, the Centenary Wonder, authored by the carnival planner Alex de Souza, which in partnership with the controversial Paulo Barros, finished in 4th place.

For the carnival of 2010, the village spoke about the centenary of Noel Rosa, with the plot "Noel: the presence of the poet's Village," with a samba composed by Martinho da Vila, the first time since 1993. In the end, the school was in 4th place.

== Classifications ==
Year	Place	Division	Plot	Carnivals Producers	Ref
Year	Place	Division	Plot	Singers	Ref
1947	12th place	UGESB	Escrava rainha	Miguel Moura	
1948	Did not parade				
1952	Trial canceled		Fé, Esperança e Caridade	Miguel Moura	
Did not parade in 1953 and 1954					
1955	11th place	Group 2	Obras da natureza	Antônio Fernandes; Seu China; Djalma Fernandes	
1955	11th place	Group 2	Obras da natureza	Paulinho da Vila	
1949	8th place	UGESB	Iracema	Miguel Moura	
1950	9th place	UGESB	Baía da Guanabara	Miguel Moura	
1951	Did not parade				
1956	Vice Champion	Grupo 2	Três épocas	Gabriel Pena	
1956	Vice Champion	Grupo 2	Três épocas	Paulinho da Vila	
1957	16th place	Grupo 1	O grande baile da Ilha Fiscal	Miguel Moura	
1957	16th place	Grupo 1	O grande baile da Ilha Fiscal	Paulinho da Vila	
1958	5th place	Grupo 2	Riquezas do Brasil	Gabriel do Nascimento	
1958	5th place	Grupo 2	Riquezas do Brasil	Paulinho da Vila	
1959	12th place	Grupo 2	Saldanha da Gama	Gabriel do Nascimento	
1959	12th place	Grupo 2	Saldanha da Gama	Paulinho da Vila	
1960	Champion	Grupo 3	Poeta dos Escravos	Gabriel do Nascimento	
1960	Champion	Grupo 3	Poeta dos Escravos	Paulinho da Vila	
1961	4th place	Grupo 2	A imprensa através dos tempos	Gabriel do Nascimento	
1961	4th place	Grupo 2	A imprensa através dos tempos	Paulinho da Vila	
1962	8th place	Grupo 2	D. João VI	Gabriel do Nascimento	
1962	8th place	Grupo 2	D. João VI	Paulinho da Vila	
1963	4th place	Grupo 2	Três fatos históricos	Gabriel do Nascimento	
1963	4th place	Grupo 2	Três fatos históricos	Paulinho da Vila	
1964	3rd place	Grupo 2	Exaltação à Bahia	Gabriel do Nascimento	
1964	3rd place	Grupo 2	Exaltação à Bahia	Paulinho da Vila	
1965	Vice Champion	Grupo 2	Epopéia do Teatro Municipal	Gabriel do Nascimento	
1965	Vice Champion	Grupo 2	Epopéia do Teatro Municipal	Paulinho da Vila	
1966	4th place	Grupo 1	Três acontecimentos históricos	Gabriel do Nascimento; Dário Trindade	
1966	4th place	Grupo 1	Três acontecimentos históricos	Paulinho da Vila	
1967	4th place	Grupo 1	Carnaval das ilusões	Gabriel do Nascimento; Dário Trindade	
1967	4th place	Grupo 1	Carnaval das ilusões	Paulinho da Vila	
1968	8th place	Grupo 1	Quatro séculos de modas e costumes	Augusto Gonçalves; Walter Tomé	
1968	8th place	Grupo 1	Quatro séculos de modas e costumes	Paulinho da Vila	
1969	5th place	Grupo 1	Yá-Yá do Cais Dourado	Augusto Gonçalves; Walter Tomé	
1969	5th place	Grupo 1	Yá-Yá do Cais Dourado	Paulinho da Vila	
1970	5th place	Grupo 1	Glórias Gaúchas	Castelo Branco; José Ribamar; Iomar Soares	
1970	5th place	Grupo 1	Glórias Gaúchas	Paulinho da Vila	
1971	5th place	Grupo 1	Ouro mascavo	Iomar Soares	
1971	5th place	Grupo 1	Ouro mascavo	Antonio Grande	
1972	6th place	Grupo 1	Onde o Brasil Aprendeu a Liberdade	Djalma Victorio; Soares Souza	
1972	6th place	Grupo 1	Onde o Brasil Aprendeu a Liberdade	Paulinho da Vila	
1973	8th place	Grupo 1	Zodíaco no samba	Gabriel do Nascimento; Dário Trindade	
1973	8th place	Grupo 1	Zodíaco no samba	Antonio Grande	
1974	10th place	Grupo 1	Aruanã-Açu	Yarema Ostrog	
1974	10th place	Grupo 1	Aruanã-Açu	Paulinho da Vila	
1975	6th place	Grupo 1	Quatro séculos de paixão	Flávio Rangel	
1975	6th place	Grupo 1	Quatro séculos de paixão	Zé Carlos	
1976	6th place	Grupo 1	Invenção de Orfeu	Geraldo Sobreira; Flávio Rangel	
1976	6th place	Grupo 1	Invenção de Orfeu	Barbinha	
1977	5th place	Grupo 1	Ai que saudade que eu tenho	Arlindo Rodrigues; Luiz Ferreira	
1977	5th place	Grupo 1	Ai que saudade que eu tenho	Jorge Goulart	
1978	8th place	Grupo 1	Dique, um mar de amor	Departamento Cultural	
1978	8th place	Grupo 1	Dique, um mar de amor	Garganta de Ferro	
1979	Champion	Grupo 1B	Os dourados anos de Carlos Machado	Yêdda Pinheiro; Fernando Costa; Syílvio Cunha	
1979	Champion	Grupo 1B	Os dourados anos de Carlos Machado	Marcos Moran	
1980	Vice Champion	Grupo 1A	Sonho de um Sonho	Fernando Costa; Sylvio Cunha	
1980	Vice Champion	Grupo 1A	Sonho de um Sonho	Marcos Moran; Zé Carlos	
1981	9th place	Grupo 1A	Dos jardins do Éden, à era de Aquarius	Sylvio Cunha	
1981	9th place	Grupo 1A	Dos jardins do Éden, à era de Aquarius	Marcos Moran	
1982	10th place	Grupo 1A	Noel Rosa e os poetas da Vila nas batalhas do Boulevard	Viriato Ferreira	
1982	10th place	Grupo 1A	Noel Rosa e os poetas da Vila nas batalhas do Boulevard	Marcos Moran	
1983	9th place	Grupo 1A	Os imortais	Fernando Costa	
1983	9th place	Grupo 1A	Os imortais	Marcos Moran	
1984	5th place	Grupo 1A	Para tudo se acabar na quarta-feira	Fernando Costa	
1984	5th place	Grupo 1A	Para tudo se acabar na quarta-feira	Gera	
1985	3rd place	Grupo 1A	Parece que foi ontem	Max Lopes	
1985	3rd place	Grupo 1A	Parece que foi ontem	Gera	
1986	11th place	Grupo 1A	De alegria cantei, de alegria pulei, de três em três pelo mundo rodei	Max Lopes	
1986	11th place	Grupo 1A	De alegria cantei, de alegria pulei, de três em três pelo mundo rodei	Gera	
1987	5th place	Grupo 1	Raízes	Max Lopes	
1987	5th place	Grupo 1	Raízes	Gera	
1988	Champion	Grupo 1	Kizomba, a festa da raça	Milton Siqueira; Paulo César Cardoso; Ilvamar Magalhães	
1988	Champion	Grupo 1	Kizomba, a festa da raça	Gera	
1989	4th place	Grupo 1	Direito é Direito	Milton Siqueira; Paulo César Cardoso; Ilvamar Magalhães	
1989	4th place	Grupo 1	Direito é Direito	Gera	
1990	12th place	Grupo Especial	Se esta terra, se esta terra fosse minha	Ilvamar Magalhães	
1990	12th place	Grupo Especial	Se esta terra, se esta terra fosse minha	Gera	
1991	11th place	Grupo Especial	Luiz Peixoto: E tome polca!	Ilvamar Magalhães	
1991	11th place	Grupo Especial	Luiz Peixoto: E tome polca!	Gera	
1992	12th place	Grupo Especial	A Vila vê o ovo e põe as claras	Gil Ricon	
1992	12th place	Grupo Especial	A Vila vê o ovo e põe as claras	Gera	
1993	8th place	Grupo Especial	Gbala - Viagem ao templo da criação	Oswaldo Jardim	
1993	8th place	Grupo Especial	Gbala - Viagem ao templo da criação	Gera; Martinho da Vila	
1994	9th place	Grupo Especial	Muito prazer! Isabel de Bragança e Drummond Rosa da Silva, mas pode me chamar de Vila	Oswaldo Jardim	
1994	9th place	Grupo Especial	Muito prazer! Isabel de Bragança e Drummond Rosa da Silva, mas pode me chamar de Vila	Gera; Jorge Tropical	
1995	9th place	Grupo Especial	Cara e coroa, as duas faces da moeda	Max Lopes	
1995	9th place	Grupo Especial	Cara e coroa, as duas faces da moeda	Gera; Jorge Tropical	
1996	7th place	Grupo Especial	A heróica cavalgada de um povo	Max Lopes	
1996	7th place	Grupo Especial	A heróica cavalgada de um povo	Gera; Jorge Tropical	
1997	9th place	Grupo Especial	Não deixe o samba morrer	Jorge Freitas	
1997	9th place	Grupo Especial	Não deixe o samba morrer	Gera; Jorge Tropical	
1998	12th place	Grupo Especial	Lágrimas, suor e conquistas no mundo em transformação	Jorge Freitas	
1998	12th place	Grupo Especial	Lágrimas, suor e conquistas no mundo em transformação	Gera; Jorge Tropical	
1999	11th place	Grupo Especial	João Pessoa, onde o sol brilha mais cedo	Jorge Freitas; João Luís de Moura	
1999	11th place	Grupo Especial	João Pessoa, onde o sol brilha mais cedo	Gera; Jorge Tropical	
2000	13th place	Grupo Especial	Academia indígena de letras - Eu sou índio, eu também sou imortal	Oswaldo Jardim	
2000	13th place	Grupo Especial	Academia indígena de letras - Eu sou índio, eu também sou imortal	Jorge Tropical	
2001	4th place	Grupo A	Estado maravilhoso cheio de encantos mil	Ricardo Pavão; Rachid; Márcia Braga; Martinho da Vila; Jorge Caribé	
2001	4th place	Grupo A	Estado maravilhoso cheio de encantos mil	Jorge Tropical	
2002	2nd place	Grupo A	O glorioso Nilton Santos... Sua bola, sua vida, nossa Vila...	João Luís de Moura	
2002	2nd place	Grupo A	O glorioso Nilton Santos... Sua bola, sua vida, nossa Vila...	Jorge Tropical	
2003	3rd place	Grupo A	Oscar Niemeyer, o arquiteto no recanto da princesa	Jorge Freitas	
2003	3rd place	Grupo A	Oscar Niemeyer, o arquiteto no recanto da princesa	Jorge Tropical; Tinga	
2004	Champion	Grupo A	A Vila é Para Ti...	João Luís de Moura	
2004	Champion	Grupo A	A Vila é Para Ti...	Tinga	
2005	10th place	Grupo Especial	Singrando os mares e construindo o futuro	Joãosinho Trinta; Wany Araújo	
2005	10th place	Grupo Especial	Singrando os mares e construindo o futuro	Tinga	
2006	Champion	Grupo Especial	Soy loco por tí, América: A Vila canta a latinidade	Alexandre Louzada	
2006	Champion	Grupo Especial	Soy loco por tí, América: A Vila canta a latinidade	Tinga	
2007	6th place	Grupo Especial	Metamorfoses: do reino natural à corte popular do carnaval - as transformações da vida	Cid Carvalho	
2007	6th place	Grupo Especial	Metamorfoses: do reino natural à corte popular do carnaval - as transformações da vida	Tinga	
2008	9th place	Grupo Especial	Trabalhadores do Brasil	Alex de Souza	
2008	9th place	Grupo Especial	Trabalhadores do Brasil	Tinga	
2009	4th place	Grupo Especial	Neste palco da folia, minha Vila anuncia: Theatro Municipal, a centenária maravilha	Alex de Souza; Paulo Barros	
2009	4th place	Grupo Especial	Neste palco da folia, minha Vila anuncia: Theatro Municipal, a centenária maravilha	Tinga	
2010	4th place	Grupo Especial	Noel: a presença do poeta da Vila	Alex de Souza	
2010	4th place	Grupo Especial	Noel: a presença do poeta da Vila	Tinga	
2011	4th place	Grupo Especial	Mitos e histórias entrelaçadas pelos fios de cabelo	Rosa Magalhães	
2011	4th place	Grupo Especial	Mitos e histórias entrelaçadas pelos fios de cabelo	Tinga	
2012	3rd place	Grupo Especial	Você semba lá .... Que eu sambo cá! O canto livre de Angola	Rosa Magalhães	
2012	3rd place	Grupo Especial	Você semba lá .... Que eu sambo cá! O canto livre de Angola	Tinga	
2013	Champion	Grupo Especial	A Vila canta o Brasil, celeiro do mundo - Água no feijão que chegou mais um	Rosa Magalhães	
2013	Champion	Grupo Especial	A Vila canta o Brasil, celeiro do mundo - Água no feijão que chegou mais um	Tinga	
2014	10th place	Grupo Especial	Retratos de um Brasil plural	Cid Carvalho	
2014	10th place	Grupo Especial	Retratos de um Brasil plural	Gilsinho	
2015	11th place	Grupo Especial	O Maestro Brasileiro está na terra de Noel... a partitura é azul e branco da nossa Vila Isabel	Max Lopes	
2015	11th place	Grupo Especial	O Maestro Brasileiro está na terra de Noel... a partitura é azul e branco da nossa Vila Isabel	Gilsinho	
2016	8th place	Grupo Especial	Memórias do 'Pai Arraia' - um sonho pernambucano, um legado brasileiro	Alex de Souza	
2016	8th place	Grupo Especial	Memórias do 'Pai Arraia' - um sonho pernambucano, um legado brasileiro	Igor Sorriso	
2017	10th place	Grupo Especial	O som da cor	Alex de Souza	
2017	10th place	Grupo Especial	O som da cor	Igor Sorriso	
2018	9th place	Grupo Especial	Corra que o futuro vem aí	Paulo Barros; Paulo Menezes	
2018	9th place	Grupo Especial	Corra que o futuro vem aí	Igor Sorriso	
2019	3rd place	Grupo Especial	Em nome do Pai, do Filho e dos Santos, A Vila canta a cidade de Pedro	Edson Pereira	
2019	3rd place	Grupo Especial	Em nome do Pai, do Filho e dos Santos, A Vila canta a cidade de Pedro	Tinga	
2020	8th place	Grupo Especial	Gigante Pela Própria Natureza - Jaçanã e um Índio Chamado Brasil	Edson Pereira	
2020	8th place	Grupo Especial	Gigante Pela Própria Natureza - Jaçanã e um Índio Chamado Brasil	Tinga	
2022	4th place	Grupo Especial	Canta, Canta, Minha gente! A Vila é de Martinho!	Edson Pereira	
2022	4th place	Grupo Especial	Canta, Canta, Minha gente! A Vila é de Martinho!	Tinga	
