= Unidos da Tijuca =

- Foundation: 12 August 1928; 97 years ago
- President: Fernando Horta
Carnival staff
- Carnival producer: Paulo Barros
- Carnival singer: Wantuir
- Carnival director: Fernando Costa
- Harmony director: Fernando Costa
- Director of Battery: Mestre Casagrande
- Queen of Battery: Juliana Alves
- Mestre-sala and Porta-Bandeira: Alex Marcelino; Raphaela Caboclo
- Choreography: Jardel Lemos

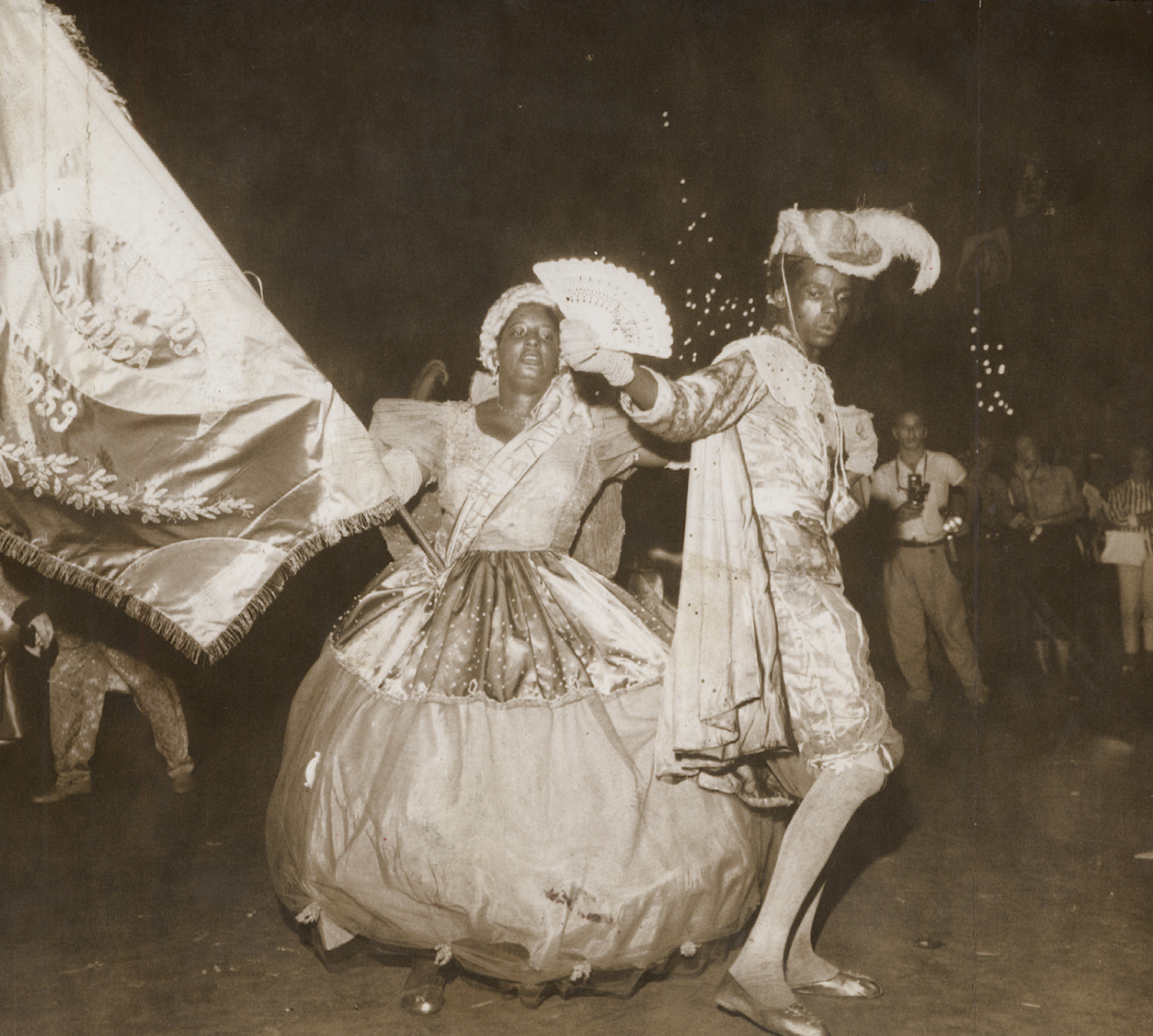
1960 Unidos da Tijuca Parade

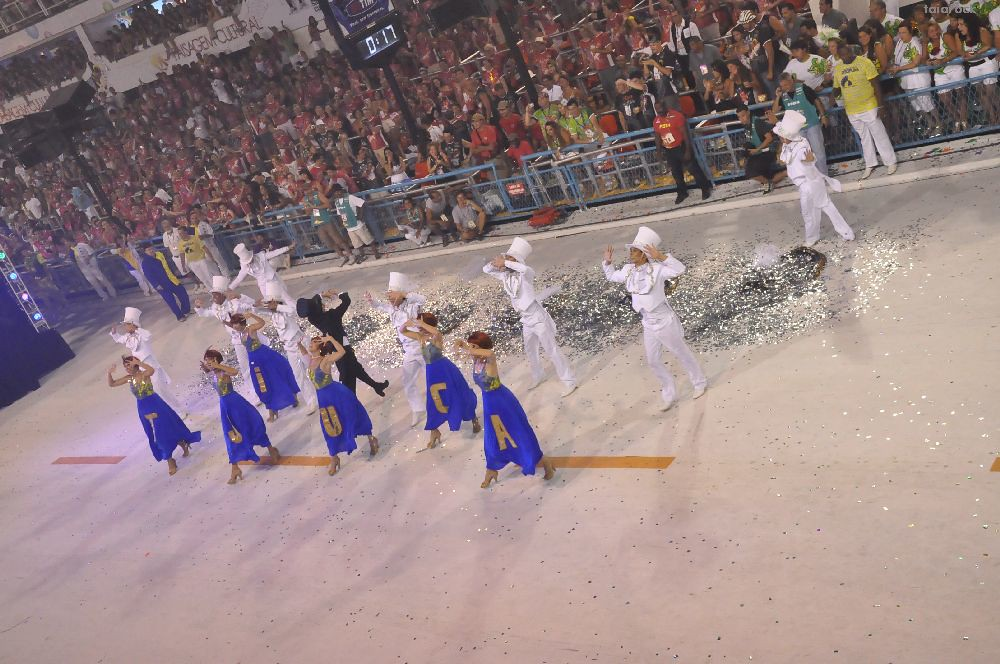
Comissão de frente da Tijuca, no ano de 2010. sendo a comissão que mudou o estilo desse segmento no carnaval.

The Grêmio Recreativo Escola de Samba Unidos da Tijuca is a samba school of the city of Rio de Janeiro. It was founded on 31 December 1931 from the fusion of existing blocks in Morro do Borel. Among its founders are Leandro Chagas, João de Almeida, Pacific Vasconcelos, Tatão, Alfredo Gomes, Marina Silva, Orlando da Costa Godinho, Zeneida Oliveira, and Regina Vasconcelos.

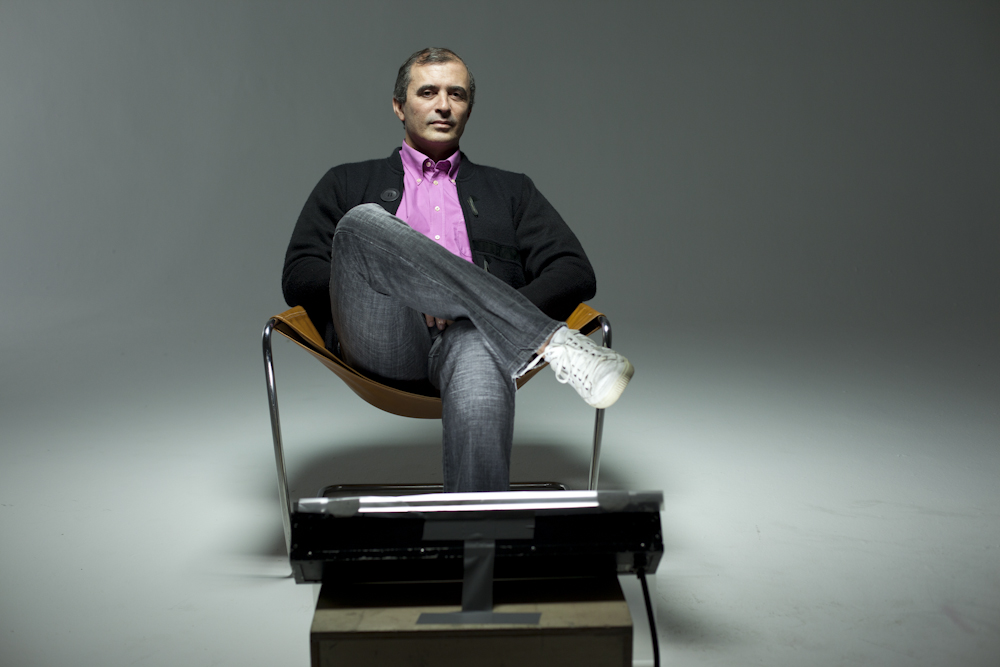
Paulo Barros is responsible for the innovative style of the school.

== Classifications ==
Year	Place	Division	Plot	Carnivals Producers	Ref
Year	Place	Division	Plot	Singers	Ref
1932	3rd place	ÚNICO		Departamento de Carnaval	
1932	3rd place	ÚNICO		Alceu Maranhão	
1933	3rd place	ÚNICO	O Mundo do Samba	Departamento de Carnaval	
1933	3rd place	ÚNICO	O Mundo do Samba	Alceu Maranhão	
1934	Vice Champion	EXTRA		Departamento de Carnaval	
1934	Vice Champion	EXTRA		Alceu Maranhão	
1935	5th place	UGESB		Departamento de Carnaval	
1935	5th place	UGESB		Alceu Maranhão	
1936	Champion	UGESB	Sonhos Delirantes	Departamento de Carnaval	
1936	Champion	UGESB	Sonhos Delirantes	Alceu Maranhão	
1937	Not Paraded	UGESB	Sonho das Graças	Departamento de Carnaval	
1937	Not Paraded	UGESB	Sonho das Graças	Alceu Maranhão	
1939	6	UGESB		Departamento de Carnaval	
1939	6	UGESB		Alceu Maranhão	
1942	15th place	UGESB		Departamento de Carnaval	
1942	15th place	UGESB		Alceu Maranhão	
1943	UGESB		Monte Castelo	Departamento de Carnaval	
1943	UGESB		Monte Castelo	Nelson de Morais	
1946	7th place	UGESB	Anjos da Paz	Departamento de Carnaval	
1946	7th place	UGESB	Anjos da Paz	Nelson de Morais	
1947	8th place	UGESB	Homenagem à Cascatinha	Departamento de Carnaval	
1947	8th place	UGESB	Homenagem à Cascatinha	Nelson de Morais	
1948	Vice Champion	FBES	Lei Áurea	Departamento de Carnaval	
1948	Vice Champion	FBES	Lei Áurea	Nelson de Morais	
1949	6th place	UGESB	Proclamação da República	Departamento de Carnaval	
1949	6th place	UGESB	Proclamação da República	Nelson de Morais	
1950	3rd place	UCES	Homenagem a Santos Dumont	Departamento de Carnaval	
1950	3rd place	UCES	Homenagem a Santos Dumont	Nelson de Morais	
1951	6th place	UGESB	Três de outubro	Departamento de Carnaval	
1951	6th place	UGESB	Três de outubro	Nelson de Morais	
1953	5th place	Grupo 1	Também temos nossos heróis: Caxias, Barroso e Santos Dumont	Miguel Moura	
1953	5th place	Grupo 1	Também temos nossos heróis: Caxias, Barroso e Santos Dumont	Nelson de Morais	
1954	11th place	Grupo 1	4° Centenário de São Paulo	Miguel Moura	
1954	11th place	Grupo 1	4° Centenário de São Paulo	Nelson de Morais	
1955	11th place	Grupo 1	Inferno Verde	Miguel Moura	
1955	11th place	Grupo 1	Inferno Verde	Nelson de Morais	
1956	6th place	Grupo 1	Sinhá Moça	Miguel Moura	
1956	6th place	Grupo 1	Sinhá Moça	Nelson de Morais	
1957	11th place	Grupo 1	Fascinação do Ouro e Diamantes	Miguel Moura	
1957	11th place	Grupo 1	Fascinação do Ouro e Diamantes	Zequinha Reis	
1958	11th place	Grupo 1	O Patriarca da Independência	Miguel Moura	
1958	11th place	Grupo 1	O Patriarca da Independência	Zequinha Reis	
1959	16th place	Grupo 1	Bravos e Heroínas	Departamento de Carnaval	
1959	16th place	Grupo 1	Bravos e Heroínas	Zequinha Reis	
1960	8th place	Grupo 2	Sonho de Bravos	Departamento de Carnaval	
1960	8th place	Grupo 2	Sonho de Bravos	Zequinha Reis	
1961	7th place	Grupo 2	Casa-Grande e Senzala	Departamento de Carnaval	
1961	7th place	Grupo 2	Casa-Grande e Senzala	Zequinha Reis	
1962	7th place	Grupo 2	Rio Pitoresco	Departamento de Carnaval	
1962	7th place	Grupo 2	Rio Pitoresco	Zequinha Reis	
1963	8th place	Grupo 12	Do Oiapoque ao Chuí	Departamento de Carnaval	
1963	8th place	Grupo 12	Do Oiapoque ao Chuí	Zequinha Reis	
1964	4th place	Grupo 2	Homenagem ao Rio Grande do Sul	Departamento de Carnaval	
1964	4th place	Grupo 2	Homenagem ao Rio Grande do Sul	Zequinha Reis	
1965	5th place	Grupo 2		Departamento de Carnaval	
1965	5th place	Grupo 2		Zequinha Reis	
1966	11th place	Grupo 1 2	O Império em Três Atos	Departamento de Carnaval	
1966	11th place	Grupo 1 2	O Império em Três Atos	Zequinha Reis	
1968	3rd place	Grupo 1 2	Danças do Brasil	Departamento de Carnaval	
1968	3rd place	Grupo 1 2	Danças do Brasil	Luís Carlos	
1969	8th place	Grupo 1 2	Tijuca sempre jovem	Departamento de Carnaval	
1969	8th place	Grupo 1 2	Tijuca sempre jovem	Luís Carlos	
1970	12th place	Grupo 1 2	Festa da Bahia	Departamento de Carnaval	
1970	12th place	Grupo 1 2	Festa da Bahia	Luís Carlos	
1971	10th place	Grupo 2	Quiva e laiá	Departamento de Carnaval	
1971	10th place	Grupo 2	Quiva e laiá	Luís Carlos	
1972	10th place	Grupo 2	Ganga Zumba	Departamento de Carnaval	
1972	10th place	Grupo 2	Ganga Zumba	Gambazinho	
1973	8th place	Grupo 2	Bom dia, café!	Clóvis Bornay	
1973	8th place	Grupo 2	Bom dia, café!	Gambazinho	
1974	15th place	Grupo 2	Petrópolis, nossa flor Serrana	Julio Matos; Poti	
1974	15th place	Grupo 2	Petrópolis, nossa flor Serrana	Pedrinho da Flor	
1975	6th place	Grupo 2	Magia Africana no Brasil e seus Mistérios	Julio Matos; Poti	
1975	6th place	Grupo 2	Magia Africana no Brasil e seus Mistérios	Gambazinho	
1976	4th place	Grupo 2	Mundo encantado dos Deuses Afro-Brasileiros	Julio Matos; Poti	
1976	4th place	Grupo 2	Mundo encantado dos Deuses Afro-Brasileiros	Gambazinho	
1977	9th place	Grupo 2	Paraíso dos Sonhos	Julio Matos; Poti	
1977	9th place	Grupo 2	Paraíso dos Sonhos	Nogueirinha	
1978	15th place	Grupo 2	A Praça, sonho, amor e fantasia	Orlando Pereira	
1978	15th place	Grupo 2	A Praça, sonho, amor e fantasia	Nogueirinha	
1979	3rd place	Grupo 2A	Brasil canta e dança	Geraldo Sobreira	
1979	3rd place	Grupo 2A	Brasil canta e dança	Nogueirinha	
1980	Champion	Grupo 1B	Delmiro Gouveia	Renato Lage	
1980	Champion	Grupo 1B	Delmiro Gouveia	Neguinho da Beija-Flor	
1981	8th place	Grupo 1A	Macobeba - O que dá pra rir dá pra chorar	Renato Lage	
1981	8th place	Grupo 1A	Macobeba - O que dá pra rir dá pra chorar	Sobrinho	
1982	9th place	Grupo 1A	Lima Barreto, mulato pobre, mas livre	Renato Lage	
1982	9th place	Grupo 1A	Lima Barreto, mulato pobre, mas livre	Sobrinho	
1983	10th place	Grupo 1A	Devagar com o andor que o santo é de barro	Yarema Ostrog	
1983	10th place	Grupo 1A	Devagar com o andor que o santo é de barro	Sobrinho	
1984	7th place	Grupo 1A	Salamaleikum - A epopéia dos insubmissos Malês	Luiz Carlos Cruz	
1984	7th place	Grupo 1A	Salamaleikum - A epopéia dos insubmissos Malês	Sobrinho	
1985	Vice Champion	Grupo 1B	Mas o que foi que aconteceu?	Sylvio Cunha	
1985	Vice Champion	Grupo 1B	Mas o que foi que aconteceu?	Nogueirinha	
1986	15th place	Grupo 1A	Cama, Mesa e Banho de Gato	Wany Araújo	
1986	15th place	Grupo 1A	Cama, Mesa e Banho de Gato	Nêgo	
1987	Champion	Grupo 2	As Três Faces da Moeda	Sylvio Cunha	
1987	Champion	Grupo 2	As Três Faces da Moeda	Nêgo	
1988	11th place	Grupo 1	Templo do Absurdo - Bar Brasil	Sylvio Cunha	
1988	11th place	Grupo 1	Templo do Absurdo - Bar Brasil	Nêgo	
1989	8th place	Grupo 1	De Portugal a Bienal no país do Carnaval	Mário Monteiro	
1989	8th place	Grupo 1	De Portugal a Bienal no país do Carnaval	Nêgo	
1990	9th place	Grupo Especial	E o Borel descobriu, Navegar foi preciso	Luiz Fernando Reis; Flávio Tavares	
1990	9th place	Grupo Especial	E o Borel descobriu, Navegar foi preciso	Nêgo	
1991	8th place	Grupo Especial	Tá na mesa, Brasil	Oswaldo Jardim	
1991	8th place	Grupo Especial	Tá na mesa, Brasil	Nêgo	
1992	8th place	Grupo Especial	Guanabaram, o Seio do Mar	Oswaldo Jardim	
1992	8th place	Grupo Especial	Guanabaram, o Seio do Mar	Nêgo	
1993	12th place	Grupo Especial	Dança, Brasil	Shanghai	
1993	12th place	Grupo Especial	Dança, Brasil	Vaguinho	
1994	14th place	Grupo Especial	Só... Rio é Verão	Sylvio Cunha	
1994	14th place	Grupo Especial	Só... Rio é Verão	Carlinhos de Pilares	
1995	12th place	Grupo Especial	Os nove bravos do Guarany	Oswaldo Jardim	
1995	12th place	Grupo Especial	Os nove bravos do Guarany	Paulinho Mocidade	
1996	14th place	Grupo Especial	Ganga - Zumbi, expressão de uma raça	Lucas Pinto	
1996	14th place	Grupo Especial	Ganga - Zumbi, expressão de uma raça	Paulinho Mocidade	
1997	11th place	Grupo Especial	Viagem pitoresca pelos cinco continentes num jardim	Lucas Pinto	
1997	11th place	Grupo Especial	Viagem pitoresca pelos cinco continentes num jardim	Serginho do Porto	
1998	13th place	Grupo Especial	De Gama a Vasco - A epopéia da Tijuca	Oswaldo Jardim	
1998	13th place	Grupo Especial	De Gama a Vasco - A epopéia da Tijuca	Serginho do Porto	
1999	Champion	Grupo A	O Dono da Terra	Oswaldo Jardim	
1999	Champion	Grupo A	O Dono da Terra	David do Pandeiro	
2000	5th place	Grupo Especial	Terra dos Papagaios… Navegar foi Preciso	Chico Spinoza	
2000	5th place	Grupo Especial	Terra dos Papagaios… Navegar foi Preciso	David do Pandeiro	
2001	9th place	Grupo Especial	Com Nelson Rodrigues, Pelo Buraco da Fechadura	Chico Spinoza	
2001	9th place	Grupo Especial	Com Nelson Rodrigues, Pelo Buraco da Fechadura	Wantuir	
2002	10th place	Grupo Especial	O sol brilha eternamente sobre o mundo de língua portuguesa	Milton Cunha	
2002	10th place	Grupo Especial	O sol brilha eternamente sobre o mundo de língua portuguesa	Wantuir	
2003	9th place	Grupo Especial	Agudas, os que levaram a África no coração, e trouxeram para o coração da África, o Brasil	Milton Cunha	
2003	9th place	Grupo Especial	Agudas, os que levaram a África no coração, e trouxeram para o coração da África, o Brasil	Nêgo	
2004	Vice Champion	Grupo Especial	O sonho da criação e a criação do sonho: a arte da ciência no tempo do impossível	Paulo Barros	
2004	Vice Champion	Grupo Especial	O sonho da criação e a criação do sonho: a arte da ciência no tempo do impossível	Wantuir	
2005	Vice Champion	Grupo Especial	Entrou por em lado, saiu pelo outro… quem quiser que invente outro!	Paulo Barros	
2005	Vice Champion	Grupo Especial	Entrou por em lado, saiu pelo outro… quem quiser que invente outro!	Wantuir	
2006	6th place	Grupo Especial	Ouvindo tudo o que vejo, vou vendo tudo o que ouço	Paulo Barros	
2006	6th place	Grupo Especial	Ouvindo tudo o que vejo, vou vendo tudo o que ouço	Wantuir	
2007	4th place	Grupo Especial	De lambida em lambida, a Tijuca dá um click na avenida	Lane Santana; Luiz Carlos Bruno	
2007	4th place	Grupo Especial	De lambida em lambida, a Tijuca dá um click na avenida	Wantuir	
2008	5th place	Grupo Especial	Vou juntando o que eu quiser, minha mania vale ouro. Sou Tijuca, trago a arte colecionando o meu tesouro	Luiz Carlos Bruno	
2008	5th place	Grupo Especial	Vou juntando o que eu quiser, minha mania vale ouro. Sou Tijuca, trago a arte colecionando o meu tesouro	Wantuir	
2009	9th place	Grupo Especial	Tijuca 2009: uma odisséia sobre o espaço	Luiz Carlos Bruno	
2009	9th place	Grupo Especial	Tijuca 2009: uma odisséia sobre o espaço	Bruno Ribas	
2010	Champion	Grupo Especial	É segredo!	Paulo Barros	
2010	Champion	Grupo Especial	É segredo!	Bruno Ribas	
2011	Vice Champion	Grupo Especial	Esta noite levarei sua alma	Paulo Barros	
2011	Vice Champion	Grupo Especial	Esta noite levarei sua alma	Bruno Ribas	
2012	Champion	Grupo Especial	O Dia em Que Toda a Realeza Desembarcou na Avenida para Coroar o Rei Luiz do Sertão	Paulo Barros	
2012	Champion	Grupo Especial	O Dia em Que Toda a Realeza Desembarcou na Avenida para Coroar o Rei Luiz do Sertão	Bruno Ribas	
2013	3rd place	Grupo Especial	Desceu num raio, é trovoada. O deus Thor pede passagem para mostrar nessa viagem a Alemanha encantada	Paulo Barros	
2013	3rd place	Grupo Especial	Desceu num raio, é trovoada. O deus Thor pede passagem para mostrar nessa viagem a Alemanha encantada	Bruno Ribas	
2014	Champion	Group Special	Acelera, Tijuca!	Paulo Barros	
2014	Champion	Group Special	Acelera, Tijuca!	Tinga	
2015	4th place	Grupo Especial	Um conto marcado no tempo. O olhar suíço de Clóvis Bornay	Mauro Quintaes; Annik Salmon; Marcus Paulo; Hélcio Paim; Carlos Carvalho	
2015	4th place	Grupo Especial	Um conto marcado no tempo. O olhar suíço de Clóvis Bornay	Tinga	
2016	Vice Champion	Grupo Especial	Semeando sorriso, a Tijuca festeja o solo sagrado	Mauro Quintaes; Annik Salmon; Marcus Paulo; Hélcio Paim	
2016	Vice Champion	Grupo Especial	Semeando sorriso, a Tijuca festeja o solo sagrado	Tinga	
2017	11th place	Grupo Especial	Música na alma, inspiração de uma nação	Mauro Quintaes; Annik Salmon; Marcus Paulo; Hélcio Paim	
2017	11th place	Grupo Especial	Música na alma, inspiração de uma nação	Tinga	
2018	7th place	Grupo Especial	Um conto Urbano: Miguel, o Arauto das Artes saúda o Povo e Pede passagem	Annik Salmon; Marcus Paulo; Hélcio Paim	
2018	7th place	Grupo Especial	Um conto Urbano: Miguel, o Arauto das Artes saúda o Povo e Pede passagem	Tinga	
2019	7th place	Grupo Especial	Cada macaco no seu galho. Ó, meu pai, me dê o pão que eu não morro de fome!	Laíla; Annik Salmon; Marcus Paulo; Hélcio Paim; Fran Sérgio	
2019	7th place	Grupo Especial	Cada macaco no seu galho. Ó, meu pai, me dê o pão que eu não morro de fome!	Wantuir	
2020	9th place	Grupo Especial	Onde moram os sonhos	Paulo Barros; Marcus Paulo; Hélcio Paim	
2020	9th place	Grupo Especial	Onde moram os sonhos	Wantuir	
2022		Grupo Especial		Jack Vasconcelos	
2022		Grupo Especial		Wantuir	
