= Barreto, Niterói =

Coordinates: 22.86004°S 43.09971°W

Barreto is a middle-class neighborhood in the northern zone Niterói, bordering the municipality of São Gonçalo and by the coast of Guanabara Bay. It was built along the way of Niterói-Manilha road.
