= Joãosinho Trinta =

Brazilian director of parades

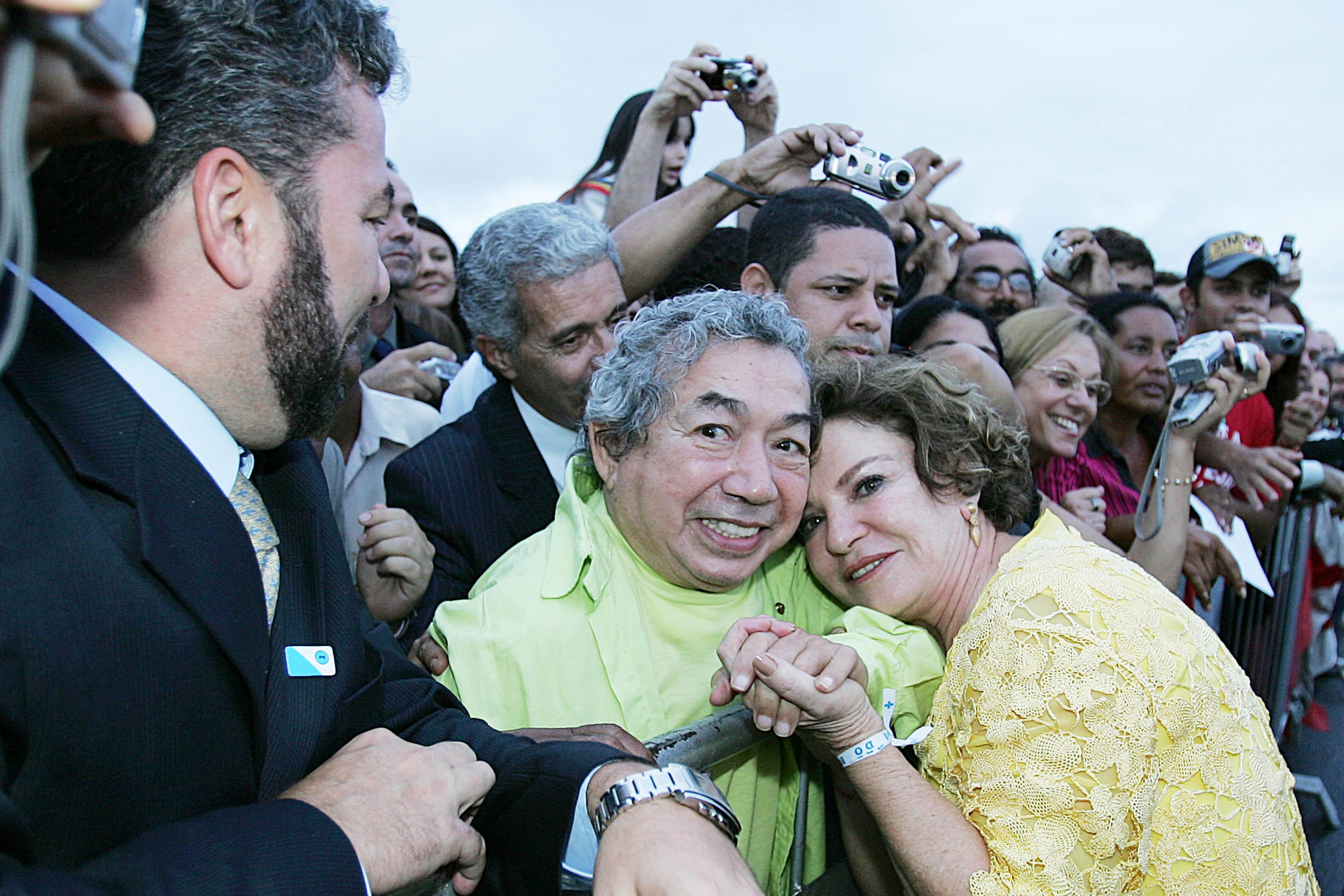
Joãosinho Trinta and first-lady Marisa Letícia (2007)

João Clemente Jorge Trinta, better known as Joãosinho Trinta (23 November 1933 – 17 December 2011), was a Brazilian director of parades for Samba Schools in Rio de Janeiro during Carnival (carnavalesco).

Trinta is credited in changing the aesthetics of the main carnival Parade in Rio during the 1980s. Trinta introduced a new standard for the costumes and enlarged the scenery, creating new dimensions of visual impact. The local press gave him large space in the media as a public person in Brazil, after his reply to critics: "Only intellectuals like poverty, the poor people like luxury."

Trinta's style was copied by competing Schools of Samba. In 1989 he caused another media impact through the parade, when he called attention to the operatic elements of Carnival and brought to the Avenue Marques de Sapucai a parade that was void of any shining costumes and used an aesthetic of trash to print a dark image into the history of the event. The parade of Samba School Beija Flor that year marks a historic shift in the evolution of the genre. The most publicized image of the parade was the Black Christ, a tourist landmark in Rio that would have been represented as a gigantic beggar, but due to a prohibition articulated by the Catholic church ended up parading under a veil of black plastic, a dark shape that resonated with the social debate happening in the country at the time.

Joãosinho Trinta died in 2011 and was buried in his native state of Maranhão.
