= Paulo Barros (carnival planner) =

Brazilian carnival planner

Paul Barros
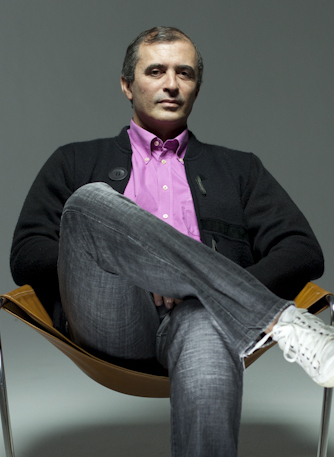
- Barros in 2010
- Born: 14 May 1962 (age 62); Nilópolis, Brazil
- Occupation: Carnival planner

Paulo Roberto Barros Braga (born Nilópolis, 14 May 1962) is a Brazilian carnavalesco, or carnival planner. He is two-time winner of the samba school title at the Rio Carnival, and has also trained circus artists and army soldiers as performers. He has been compared to Fernando Pinto (pt) and Arlindo Rodrigues.
