= Grupo Revelação =

Brazilian pagode group

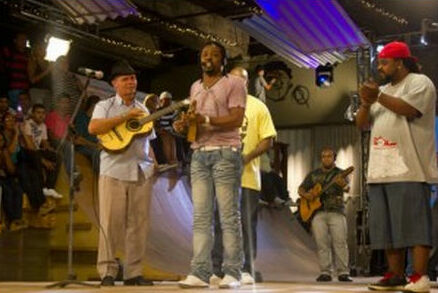

Background information
- Origin: Rio de Janeiro, Brazil
- Genres: Pagode; Samba
- Years active: 1991–present
- Label: Waves Sound
- Members: Jonathan Alexandre; Mauro Júnior; Rogerinho; Sérgio Rufino; Beto Lima; Artur Luís
- Past members: Xande de Pilares; Almirzinho; Manuel SX; Davi Pereira; Luciano Nascimento; Marco Falcão

Grupo Revelação is a Brazilian pagode group that was formed in the 1990s in Rio de Janeiro. With an original line-up that included Xande de Pilares, the group has released various albums in the 2000s to much success, including many hit singles.

== History ==
Grupo Revelação was founded on 23 April 1991 in the neighborhood of Engenho Novo. The group got its start at the Arranco samba school based in the same neighborhood. At the start, the group had great influence from Victor Stecca with pagode "de mesa" sessions that were typical of Rio de Janeiro that they had done while at Arranco. With the help of João Carlos Silva Filho, the artistic manager of radio station FM O Dia, the group released many popular songs in the Rio de Janeiro region. This led them to success with their first album, Revelação, in 2000, launched with the record label BMG. The album also includes the participation of some of the members of Kiloucura, along with a cover of the Leci Brandão song "Zé do Caroço".

2002 was a decisive year for the group as they switched record labels, going with Deskdisc and releasing the album “Ao Vivo no Olimpo”, which sold more than 700,000 copies and was the second highest selling album that year, the highest sold for a pagode album. Though their success had initially been restricted to Rio de Janeiro, they came to national prominence and, by 2003, they began to perform abroad, starting a tour in the United States, Japan, and Europe. They would go on to release “Novos Tempos”, their fourth album and second under Deckdisc.

In 2005, Grupo Revelação would release the first samba DualDisc in Brazil to commemorate the first million copies sold through Deckdisc. In 2006, they gave a sequence of registers live and returned to record in the studio, releasing another album to great success, titled Velocidade da Luz. In 2007, Grupo Revelação released a best hits album titled 100% Revelação. They would follow this up with the release of their 2008 album Aventureiro, which included many of their radio hits at the time, including "Aventureiro" and "Medo de Amar", among others.

With the goal of expanding even more the true essence of Brazilian samba, Grupo Revelação decided to release another live album in 2009. This time the work was much greater as the goal was to record a DVD. Coming from underserved communities in Rio de Janeiro, the members of the group could not record in any other place than on the hills, and so they chose Morro da Urca as their place to record. As a result, the DVD came to be known as Ao Vivo no Morro. The arena was crowded on the day it was recorded, 29 August 2009. It would later be followed up by a sequel, Ao Vivo no Morro 2, which would mark the debut of the group with Universal Music.

On 3 April 2014, Xande de Pilares announced he had left to group. He was substituted by Almirzinho, the son of singer Almir Guineto.

On 23 June 2015, during an appearance on the program "Música Boa Ao Vivo" on the broadcaster Multishow, Davi Pereira, a former vocalist with Sambaí, was presented as the newest member of Grupo Revelação. Davi and Almirzinho had sung together in the group for some months; However, the group released a statement on 28 September 2015 that Almirzinho had left to pursue a solo career, with Arthur Luis also having left the group in July of that year. After Davi stayed with the group for three years, he also decided to leave to pursue a solo career. In his place, the group invited Jonathan Alexandre, the nephew of Xande, to be the vocalist and cavaquinho player like his uncle was. The new formation began on 1 November 2018.

In 2019, now with Jonathan Alexandre as a member of the group, they released their EP Confie Em Mim, produced by Bira Haway. It was their last release with DeckDisc. That same year, they signed with independent label Waves Sound and recorded the audiovisual project Pagode do Revela. Recorded at the YouTube Space in Rio de Janeiro, the launch occurred on 10 April 2020 and included previously unpublished and rerecorded songs. They also had guest appearances from artists such as Jorge Aragão, Leci Brandão, Fundo de Quintal, Renato da Rocinha, Marquinhos Sensação, and Tiee.

== Members ==
=== Current formation ===
- Jonathan Alexandre: vocals and cavaquinho
- Mauro Júnior: banjo
- Rogerinho: tan-tan
- Sérgio Rufino: pandeiro
- Beto Lima: guitar
- Artur Luís: reco-reco

=== Older members ===
- Xande de Pilares: vocals and cavaquinho
- Almirzinho: vocals and cavaquinho
- Manuel SX: vocals
- Davi Pereira: vocals
- Luciano Nascimento
- Marco Falcão: chief editor

== Discography ==
=== Albums ===
- 2000 - Revelação: BMG
- 2001 - Nosso Samba Virou Religião: BMG
- 2002 - Ao Vivo no Olimpo: Deckdisc • BMG
- 2002 - O Melhor do Pagode de Mesa: Deckdisc
- 2003 - Novos Tempos: Deckdisc
- 2004 - Ao Vivo - Na Palma da Mão: Deckdisc
- 2006 - Velocidade da Luz: Deckdisc
- 2007 - 100% Revelação: Som Livre
- 2008 - Aventureiro: Deckdisc
- 2009 - Ao Vivo no Morro: Deckdisc
- 2010 - Ao Vivo no Morro 2: Universal Music
- 2012 - 360° Ao Vivo: Universal Music
- 2016 - O Bom Samba Continua - Ao Vivo: Deckdisc
- 2018 - O Bom Samba continua 2 - Ao vivo: Deckdisc
- 2019 - Confie Em Mim - Ao Vivo: Desckdisc
- 2020 - Pagode do Revela - Ao Vivo: Waves Sound

=== Singles ===
| Year | Title | Album |
|---|---|---|
| 2000 | Na Palma da Mão | Revelação |
| 2000 | Meu Oceano | Revelação |
| 2001 | Virou Religião | Nosso Samba Virou Religião |
| 2001 | Deixa Acontecer | Nosso Samba Virou Religião |
| 2001 | Esqueci De Te Esquecer | Nosso Samba Virou Religião |
| 2002 | Poder de Sedução | Nosso Samba Virou Religião |
| 2002 | Grades do Coração | Ao Vivo no Olimpo |
| 2002 | Coração Radiante | Ao Vivo no Olimpo |
| 2002 | Só Me Dá Prazer | O Melhor do Pagode de Mesa |
| 2003 | Preciso Te Amar | Ao Vivo no Olimpo |
| 2003 | Essência da Paixão | Ao Vivo no Olimpo |
| 2003 | Novos Tempos | Novos Tempos |
| 2004 | Horizonte de Emoção | Novos Tempos |
| 2004 | Jogo de Sedução | Novos Tempos |
| 2004 | Talvez | Ao Vivo - Na Palma da Mão |
| 2004 | Altas Horas | Ao Vivo - Na Palma da Mão |
| 2004 | Deixa Acontecer (relançamento) | Ao Vivo - Na Palma da Mão |
| 2005 | Compasso do Amor | Ao Vivo - Na Palma da Mão |
| 2005 | A Verdadeira Paixão | 100% Revelação |
| 2006 | Velocidade da Luz | Velocidade da Luz |
| 2007 | Baixa Essa Guarda | Velocidade da Luz |
| 2007 | A Pureza da Flor | Velocidade da Luz |
| 2007 | Capaz de Tudo | Velocidade da Luz |
| 2007 | Nunca Mais | Velocidade da Luz |
| 2008 | Aventureiro | Aventureiro |
| 2008 | Medo de Amar | Aventureiro |
| 2009 | Ajoelhou Tem Que Rezar | Aventureiro |
| 2009 | Só Depois | Aventureiro |
| 2009 | Tá Escrito | Ao Vivo no Morro |
| 2010 | Coração Blindado | Ao Vivo no Morro |
| 2010 | Saudade do Amor | Ao Vivo no Morro |
| 2011 | Trilha do Amor | Ao Vivo no Morro 2 |
| 2011 | Pai | Ao Vivo no Morro 2 |
| 2011 | Bomba Relógio | Ao Vivo no Morro 2 |
| 2012 | Filho da Simplicidade | Trilha sonora da novela Avenida Brasil |
| 2012 | Só Vai de Camarote | 360° Ao Vivo |
| 2013 | Fala Baixinho (Shiii) | 360° Ao Vivo |
| 2013 | Mulher Traída | 360° Ao Vivo |
| 2013 | Quem Ama Não Pisa | 360° Ao Vivo |
| 2014 | Ô Queiroz | 360° Ao Vivo |
| 2014 | Caminho das Flores | |
| 2015 | Vê Se Me Escuta | |
| 2015 | Segredos | O Bom Samba Continua - Ao Vivo |
| 2016 | Cavalheiro Sonhador | O Bom Samba Continua - Ao Vivo |
| 2017 | A Vida é Pedreira | Single |
| 2018 | Me Socorre Ae | Single |
| 2019 | Confie Em Mim | Confie Em Mim |
| 2019 | Perdoa Amor | Single |
| 2019 | Balanço do Meu Coração | Pagode do Revela |

== Videography ==
=== DVDs ===
- 2005 - Ao Vivo no Olimpo: Deckdisc
- 2009 - Ao Vivo no Morro: Deckdisc
- 2010 - Ao Vivo no Morro 2: Universal Music
- 2012 - 360° Ao Vivo: Universal Music
- 2020 - Pagode do Revela: Waves Sound
