= Exaltasamba =

Brazilian musical group

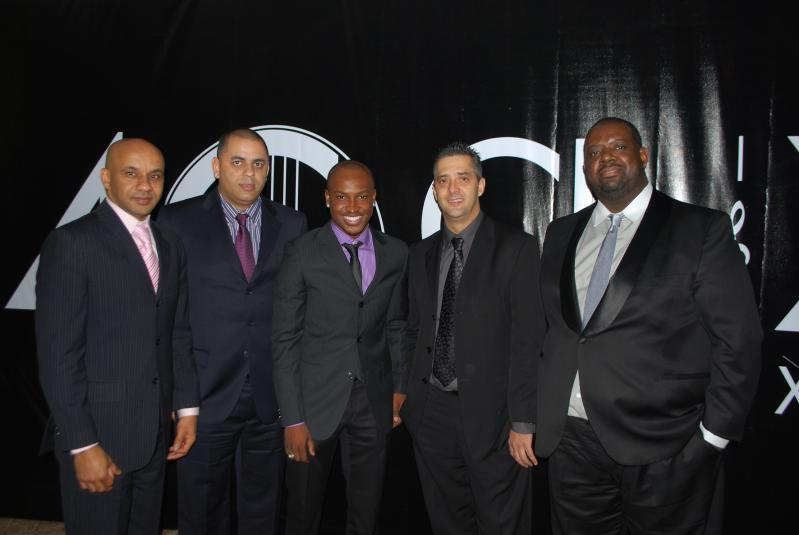
- Exaltasamba in 2010

Background information
- Origin: São Bernardo do Campo, São Paulo, Brazil
- Genres: Pagode
- Years active: 1985–2012, 2016-Present
- Labels: EMI, Som Livre, BKM - Booking Mix Records 2016-Present
- Members: Brilhantina; Thell; Magrão; Jeffinho
- Past members: Romero Ribeiro; Péricles; Thiaguinho; Pinha; Chrigor; Isaías; Marquinhos

Exalta, formerly Exaltasamba, is a Brazilian pagode music group, formed in 1982 in São Bernardo do Campo, São Paulo. The group began simply playing gigs in restaurants and bars. They later began writing their own songs, eventually releasing an album, "Eterno Amanhecer" in 1992. However, it wasn't until 1996 that they truly became successful, with their 1996 and 1997 albums, "Luz do Desejo and "Desliga e Vem" each going Double Platinum. They released a Live Album with songs handpicked by their fans via E-Mail. In 2003, one of their best known Vocalists, Thiaguinho, joined the group. They continued to release albums. Their 25th Anniversary was in 2010, and they had written new material to perform on this show. The year thereafter, Thiaguinho announced that he planned on leaving the group. They subsequently announced their disbandment after 25 years as a band. The group performed their final concert, at least for the first run in February 2012, and it was broadcast on a channel considered the Brazilian Equivalent to the United States' MTV; Multishow. The band resumed activities with the original percussionists, but casting new Vocalists, after 2016.

== History ==
In 1982 a group of musicians united and formed the Exaltasamba, that played at tables in bars and restaurants in cities of the ABC Region, although the group was originally formed in São Bernado do Campo. In the late 1980s the band started playing for Jovelina Pérola Negra in their shows and also the Exaltasamba won the Popular Music Festival of São Bernardo do Campo (SP). In 1991 the Exaltasamba appears in a disc called Chopapo only with the song "Deixa Como Está".

In 1992, the group released the first album Eterno Amanhecer by Kaskata's Records. The main song: "Quero Sentir de Novo". And in this album has the participation of singer Royce do Cavaco in the song "Cartilha do Amor". In 1993 a new member enters the group: Chrigor Lisboa on vocals and pandeiro.

In 1994, the group released the album Encanto . From then on, the group begins to perform better and to appear on television programs and radio shows. Having the song "24 Horas De Amor" as the great hit, performed on several samba wheels of Brazil.

But it was in 1996 that Exaltasamba made a resounding success with the album Luz do Desejo that was released this time by another record company EMI-Odeon, with the hits "Telegrama" and "Luz Do Desejo", the song "Luz do Desejo" Was the first song of the group that made national success. The CD reached the mark of 750 thousand copies sold.

In 1997 the group released the album "Desliga e Vem" which sold one million copies sold. The album and had the song "Caixinha de Felicidade" in Homage to Xuxa Meneghel to which this song was played in Planeta Xuxa by Exaltasamba in the presence of Xuxa in 1997.

In 1998 the group released the album Cartão Postal, this album sold one million records. This CD contains the song "Eu Me Apaixonei Pela Pessoa Errada" who won twice the Crowley Prize, this song was the most played of the radios of Brazil in January and February 1999.

In the year 2000 the group releases the album Mais Uma Vez, the album contains the hits 'Megastar' and 'Eu E Você' (participation Jorge Aragão)

In 2002 the group released the album Exaltasamba Ao Vivo which was one of the first discs released by EMI with anti-copy protection, but this technology was not perfect, thus giving the possibility of copying the disc, The recording of the album took place on May 22, 2002, in the show's house "Olimpo" in Rio de Janeiro, At the end of 2002 the vocalist "Chrigor Lisboa" leaves the group for being depressed for his father to have died and preferred to leave the Exaltasamba not to bring damages to the group, he stayed until the last bimestre of the year of 2002 not to harm the sales of the group And nor the schedule of shows. After leaving the group Chrigor made a solo career.

In 2003 enters the vocalist Thiaguinho in the group, and the group launches the album Alegrando A Massa

In 2006 Exaltasamba released the first DVD of the group Todos Os Sambas Ao Vivo recorded on April 26 at Porto Alcobaça (a show house in São Paulo), this album is almost all re-releases of the group's songs.

In 2007, the group released the album Livre Pra Voar and the album Ao Vivo Pagode do Exalta, both containing the hit Livre Pra Voar which had 50,000 paid downloads

In 2009 the group released the album Ao Vivo Na Ilha Da Magia, this album was nominated for Latin Grammy Award for Best Samba/Pagode Album,

In 2010 the group released the album 25 Anos recorded live on June 5, 2010, at the Estádio Palestra Itália in the city of São Paulo, in this recording attended by 35 thousand people. With focus on the song "Tá Vendo Aquela Lua" and the album has several special participation of: Chitãozinho & Xororó, Mariana Rios, Father Reginaldo Manzotti, Mr. Catra and Rodriguinho, and the Orquestra Versão Brasileira.

By this point, 2012, both Péricles, a long-standing member of the group since 1985, and Thiaguinho, who was their most recognized member since 2003, now have established solo-artist careers outside of Exaltasamba, and as a result, decided to part ways with the band.

Thell and Brillhantina- ex-percussionists of the group, made it known that they didn't want Exaltasamba to quit as a group. In 2015, Pericles, Pinha, Thiaguinho and Chrigor, all former Exaltasamba vocalists, held a tour called "A Gente Faz a Festa" (The People make the Party), after one of the songs in their 25th Anniversary Concert back in 2010. This tour was done with an entirely different Rhythm Section that legally isn't recognized as Exaltasamba. As a result, there were legal issues between Thiaguinho/Pericles/Pinha vs. Thell/Brilhantina, all legal disputes were settled and, essentially, Jose Zima- the group's producer- had this to say on the matter:

"It is unfortunate that there is unfair competition by allowing developers and local producers of shows in Brazil to try to sell covertly to the public a show that they say, would be the return of Exaltasamba to celebrate the 30th anniversary of the group. It's even more unfortunate, because they know that the only ones who can (legally) be on the market with all Exaltasamba activities are its two remaining founders Thell and Brilhantina."

Because Thell and Brilhantina are simply percussionists, it was decided that, should Exaltasamba come back, they were coming back with 3 new members: Much like how Thiaguinho himself was chosen as a member of Exaltasamba in 2003 after being eliminated on "Fama", a singing reality show/competition in the vein of "Idol" and "The Voice" in 2003, Romero Ribeiro was chosen as a Member of Exaltasamba as this year began, after being a finalist on "The Voice Brazil". Jefferson Clemente Machado- who is better known as Jeffinho- was brought in from another group; "Estilo de Ser". Nego Branco was chosen by the fans online.

It's been announced that Jeffinho is embarking on a Solo Career as of April 2025.

== Members ==
=== current members ===
- Thell – tan-tan (1986–2012, 2016–Present)
- Brilhantina – cavaquinho (1986-novembro de 2011, 2016-Present)
- Magrão - Lead Vocal (2018–Present)
- Jeffinho - Vocal and Pandeiro (2016–Present)

=== past members ===
- Péricles – banjo and original lead vocal (1986–2012)
- Pinha – repique (1986–2012)
- Izaías – Classical guitar (1986–2006)
- Chrigor – vocal and pandeiro (1993–2002)
- Marquinhos – tan-tan (1986–2001)
- Thiaguinho – banjo and second lead vocal (2003–2012)
- Nego Branco - Vocal and Banjo (2016–2018)
- Romero Ribeiro - Vocal and Banjo (2016–2017)

== Discography ==
=== Discography of Exaltasamba ===
Albums
Year	Title	Media	Label
1992	Eterno Amanhecer	LP and CD	Kaskata's Records
1994	Encanto	LP and CD	Kaskata's Records
1996	Luz do Desejo	LP and CD	EMI-Odeon
1997	Desliga e Vem	LP and CD	EMI-Odeon
1998	Cartão Postal	CD	EMI-Odeon
2000	Mais uma Vez	CD	EMI-Music
2001	Bons Momentos	CD	EMI
2002	Exaltasamba Ao vivo	CD	EMI
2003	Alegrando a Massa	CD	EMI
2005	Esquema Novo	CD	EMI
2006	Todos os Sambas Ao vivo	CD and DVD	EMI
2007	Livre pra Voar	CD	EMI
2007	Ao Vivo Pagode do Exalta	CD and DVD	EMI
2009	Ao Vivo Na Ilha da Magia	CD and DVD	EMI
2010	Roda de Samba do Exalta	CD	Som Livre
2010	Exaltasamba 25 Anos Ao Vivo	LP, CD and DVD	Som Livre and Radar Records
2011	Tá Vendo Aquela Lua	CD	Radar Records
2012	Multishow Ao Vivo – Despedida		
2016	O Mundo Tá Girando		

=== Solo albums ===
Péricles

- Péricles – Ao Vivo em Recife (2012)
  - First Solo Album by ex-Exaltasamba vocalist Péricles Faria.
- Sensaçoes (2012)
  - First Solo DVD/Blu-ray release by Péricles Faria.
- Nos Arcos Da Lapa (2013)
- Feito Pra Durar (2015)
- Deserto da Ilusão (2017)
- Em Sua Direção (2018)

Thiaguinho

- See discography of Thiaguinho

Chrigor

- Trilha Sonora
- Quem Me Conhece Sabe Quem Eu Sou

Pinha Presidente

- O Nosso Presidente

== Successes ==
- "Quero Sentir De Novo"
- "24 Horas De Amor"
- "Telegrama"
- "Me Apaixonei Pela Pessoa Errada"
- "Megastar"
- "Eu Você Sempre" (with Jorge Aragão)
- "Choro De Alegria" (with Zeca Pagodinho)
- "Estrela"
- "Faz Falta"
- "Valeu"
- "Tá Vendo Aquela Lua"
- "Viver Sem Ti" (with Mariana Rios)

== Awards ==
Troféu Raça Negra

Year	Title	Result	Reference
2009	"best pagode group"	Won	

Troféu Imprensa

Year	Title	Result	Reference
2011	"Best Music Set"	Won	

Latin Grammy Award

Year	Title	Result	Reference
2011	"Latin Grammy Award for Best Samba/Pagode Album"	Won	

Multishow Prize of Brazilian Music

Year	Title	Result	Reference
2011	"Best Group (popular vote)"	Won	
