= New Year's Eve in Copacabana =

Annual celebration in Brazil

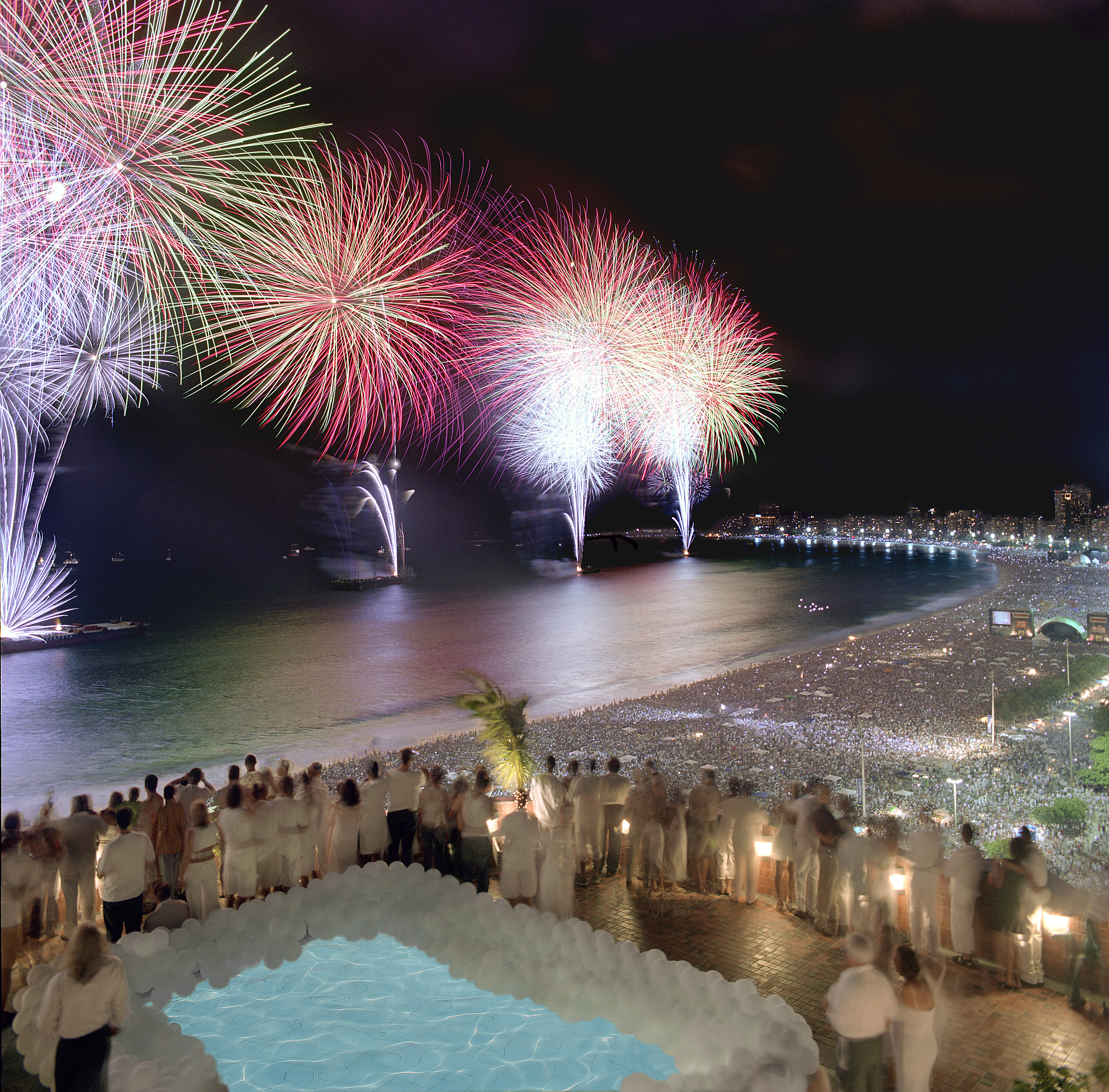
Fireworks from the Copacabana New Year's Eve celebrations during the transition from 2003 to 2004.

New Year's Eve in Copacabana or Réveillon in Cobacabana is the largest New Year's celebration in the world, taking place from December 31 to January 1 on Copacabana Beach, located in Rio de Janeiro. The event features a fireworks display lasting around 12 minutes, along with performances by various artists, currently attracting around two million people.

The word réveillon originates from the French verb réveiller, which means "to wake up." Thus, réveillon symbolizes the awakening of the new year.

== History ==
Those who began celebrating New Year's Eve on Copacabana Beach were Candomblé practitioners in the 1970s. The event was smaller in scale, and everyone wore white to honor Iemanjá, offering gifts to the sea before midnight.

The practice of wearing white clothing and offering flowers to the sea became part of the New Year's tradition, not only in Rio de Janeiro but throughout Brazil. According to Candomblé, the color white is used to symbolize mourning for death, which allows for rebirth and the continuation of life.

=== 1980s ===
The tradition of fireworks during New Year's in Copacabana was started by Mario, the owner of the former By Marius steakhouse, in 1978. He gathered local merchants from Leme to raise funds for the fireworks display. In the 1980s, the former Meridien Hotel (located at the corner of Princess Isabel Avenue) introduced its iconic firework waterfall, which marked the end of the display. The 39-story building featured a cascade of fireworks that began at the top and gradually descended down the skyscraper.

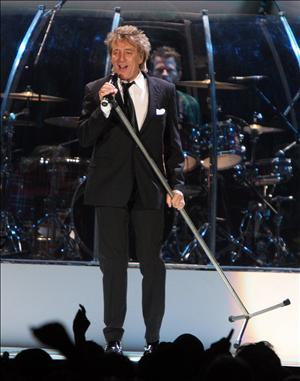
Rod Stewart performed in 1994 for 3.5 million people.

Thus, other hotels began to fund the fireworks display, attracting both tourists and locals. As the event grew, the city of Rio de Janeiro had to prioritize the safety of those attending the New Year's celebration in Copacabana. Following a serious accident on the beach, the fireworks were moved to barges out at sea. To prevent crowding after the fireworks show, the city began organizing beach concerts in 1993, ensuring people wouldn't all leave at once. Performances by Jorge Ben and Tim Maia helped ease the flow of the crowd.

Following this highly successful experience of New Year's Eve concerts, the city government registered the event as official, bringing various attractions to the Copacabana stages every year.

== Record ==
In 1993, Jorge Ben Jor attracted the third-largest audience in history, according to the Guinness World of Records, with 3 million people in Copacabana.

In 1994, British singer Rod Stewart held the largest free concert in history, recorded in the Guinness World of Records, with an audience of 3.5 million people.

== Attractions ==
| Year | Artists | Public | Observation | Ref. |
|---|---|---|---|---|
| 1993—1994 | Jorge Ben Jor; Tim Maia | 3.000,000 | First New Year's Eve show in Copacabana. Holds the record for the third-largest audience of all time in the Guinness Book. | |
| 1994—1995 | Rod Stewart | 3.500,000 | Holds the record for the largest audience of all time in the Guinness Book. | |
| 1995—1996 | Gal Costa; Gilberto Gil; Caetano Veloso; Chico Buarque; Paulinho da Viola | 2.500,000 | Tribute to Tom Jobim, who had died in December 1994. | |
| 1996—1997 | —N/a | 2.000,000 | The city hall in that year decided to continue only with the fireworks show and not have attractions at midnight. | |
| 1997—1998 | —N/a | 2.000,000 | The city hall in that year decided to continue only with the fireworks show and not have attractions at midnight. | |
| 1998—1999 | Jorge Ben Jor; Nelson Sargento; Moacyr Luz; Cristina Buarque; Monarco; Sandra de Sá; Caetano Veloso | 2.000,000 | At the inauguration of the Cardeal Arcoverde station, the trains and stations could not handle the passenger flow heading towards the Copacabana beachfront, and the system was interrupted for 45 minutes. | |
| 1999—2000 | | 2.500,000 | —N/a | |
| 2000—2001 | | 2.000,000 | During the fireworks display, an accident involving sparks and remnants of explosives killed one person and left 49 others injured. Since that incident, the fireworks, which were previously placed on the sand, have been placed on barges starting from the following New Year's Eve. | |
| 2001—2002 | Biquíni Cavadão; Capital Inicial; Gabriel, O Pensador; Rita Lee; Jorge Aragão; Ivete Sangalo; Daniel; Harmonia do Samba; Gilberto Gil; Asa de Águia; Dudu Nobre; Belo | 1.500,000 | A tribute was made to Cássia Eller, who had died two days earlier. One year after the accident, the organizers started conducting the fireworks display on barges. Four barges detonated more than 70 tons of explosives. | |
| 2002—2003 | Lenine; Jorge Ben Jor; Cidade Negra | 2.000,000 | The fireworks display lasted 17 minutes. | |
| 2003—2004 | Lulu Santos; Beija-flor; Jorge Aragão; Los Hermanos | 2.500,000 | For the first time, 8 barges launched over 15,000 fireworks into the skies of Copacabana in a 26-minute spectacle. A replica of Christ the Redeemer appeared on one of the barges in the middle of the sea. | |
| 2004—2005 | Afro Reggae; EletroSamba; Alcione; Dudu Nobre; Elba Ramalho; Barão Vermelho; Portela; Beija-Flor; Grande Rio | 2.000,000 | There was a fireworks display lasting 15 minutes, but due to the heat, it produced a lot of black smoke towards the beach during the pyrotechnic show, causing disappointment among the audience. | |
| 2005—2006 | Jorge Aragão; Fernanda Abreu; Emílio Santiago | 2.000,000 | —N/a | |
| 2006—2007 | Infected Mushroom; Black Eyed Peas | 1.200,000 | Rain, sound issues, and less popular shows emptied Copacabana. | |
| 2007—2008 | Diogo Nogueira; DJ Marlboro | 2.000,000 | —N/a | |
| 2008—2009 | Grupo Revelação; Mart'nália | 2.000,000 | The fireworks display was the second longest in history, lasting 20 minutes (only behind the 25-minute pyrotechnic show from the 2003 to 2004 New Year's Eve). | |
| 2009—2010 | Os Paralamas do Sucesso; Carlinhos Brown; Lulu Santos; Arlindo Cruz; Fundo de Quintal; Roberta Sá; Beth Carvalho; Blitz | 2.000,000 | The fireworks display lasted 15 minutes and was managed by the same Spanish company that organized the New Year's Eve celebrations between 1997 and 2000. | |
| 2010—2011 | Alcione; Zeca Pagodinho; Daniela Mercury | 2.000,000 | Official launch of the Rio 2016 Olympic Games logo. For the first time, the fireworks were synchronized with classical music in Copacabana. | |
| 2011—2012 | Beth Carvalho; David Guetta; Latino; O Rappa; Blitz | 2.000,000 | It featured a soundtrack that was also used during the New Year's Eve celebrations of 2018-2019 and 2019–2020. The fireworks lasted for 16 minutes. | |
| 2012—2013 | Marcelinho da Lua; Ellen Oléria; Claudia Leitte; Sorriso Maroto | 2.300,000 | The fireworks display lasted 16 minutes and featured the soundtrack of The Avengers. | |
| 2013—2014 | Carlinhos Brown; Lulu Santos; Nando Reis | 2.300,000 | The theme of the New Year's Eve celebration was the movie Rio 2, which premiered on March 27, 2014. The soundtrack for the fireworks display, which lasted 16 minutes, featured songs that could be heard in the first film of the franchise. | |
| 2014—2015 | Jorge Ben Jor; Zeca Pagodinho; Diogo Nogueira; Arlindo Cruz; Dudu Nobre | 2.000,000 | The theme of the celebration was the 450th anniversary of Rio de Janeiro. The first part of the soundtrack for the pyromusical show featured 9 minutes of music that had been heard during the opening and closing ceremonies of the London 2012 Olympic and Paralympic Games. The second part was composed especially for the fireworks display, featuring songs that represent the Marvelous City, ending with a classical version of "Parabéns Pra Você." One of the barges caught fire near the end of the show. | |
| 2015—2016 | Jorge Ben Jor; Zeca Pagodinho; Diogo Nogueira | 2.000,000 | The theme of the celebration was the centenary of Samba and the Rio 2016 Olympic Games. The first part of the fireworks soundtrack was composed of Brazilian classical and Olympic music, while the second part was dedicated to samba and funk. | |
| 2016—2017 | Elba Ramalho; Alceu Valença; Geraldo Azevedo; Alex Cohen; DJ MAM; Léo Jaime | 2.000,000 | Due to the financial crisis, the city government chose to set up only one stage and reduced the duration of the fireworks display, which lasted 12 minutes. | |
| 2017—2018 | Anitta; Belo; Cidade Negra; Frejat | 3.000,000 | The fireworks display featured 11 barges, 10 screens spread across the beach, and 25 tons of fireworks that lasted 17 minutes. | |
| 2018—2019 | Ludmilla; Gilberto Gil; Baby do Brasil | 2.800,000 | The Christ the Redeemer statue was illuminated with projections in sign language, featuring words like love and hope. | |
| 2019—2020 | DJ Marlboro; Diogo Nogueira; Ferrugem | 2.900,000 | With the theme "Love at Every Sight," the fireworks display lasted 14 minutes and also featured three-dimensional designs. | |
| 2020—2021 | —N/a | —N/a | Due to the COVID-19 pandemic, there were no New Year's Eve celebrations on Copacabana beach to avoid gatherings. | |
| 2021—2022 | —N/a | —N/a | For the second consecutive year, also due to the pandemic, the musical shows were canceled, but the fireworks display was maintained, lasting 16 minutes. | |
| 2022—2023 | Alexandre Pires; Iza; Zeca Pagodinho | 2.000,000 | For the first time in history, the performances in Copacabana were broadcast by TV Globo, as part of the special Show da Virada. Of the three performances, only Zeca's show was aired live. | |
| 2023—2024 | Luísa Sonza; Ludmilla; Gloria Groove; Nattanzinho; Belo; Teresa Cristina; Jorge Aragão; Diogo Nogueira | 2.000,000 | For the first time, the soundtrack was performed by a symphonic orchestra. As in 2022, the shows were broadcast by TV Globo, as part of the special Show da Virada. The novelty was the inclusion of Globoplay, which also streamed the performances from the stage of the largest New Year's Eve celebration in Brazil. | |
| 2024—2025 | Anitta; Ivete Sangalo; Caetano Veloso; Maria Bethânia | 2.600,000 | The pyrotechnic display was performed from 10 barges at sea and featured over 15 tons of fireworks fired into the open sky. | |

== Numbers ==
Starting in the new millennium, the traditional fireworks display began to be held on barges away from the beach to avoid accidents. In total, 24 tons of fireworks are set off from 11 barges, creating a 16-minute pyrotechnic show.

Tourists spend around 650 million dollars in the city every year during the period. Currently, there are three stages with various attractions throughout the night. About 500 portable toilets are set up, and by the end of the celebration, 360 tons of trash are collected.
