= Péricles (singer) =

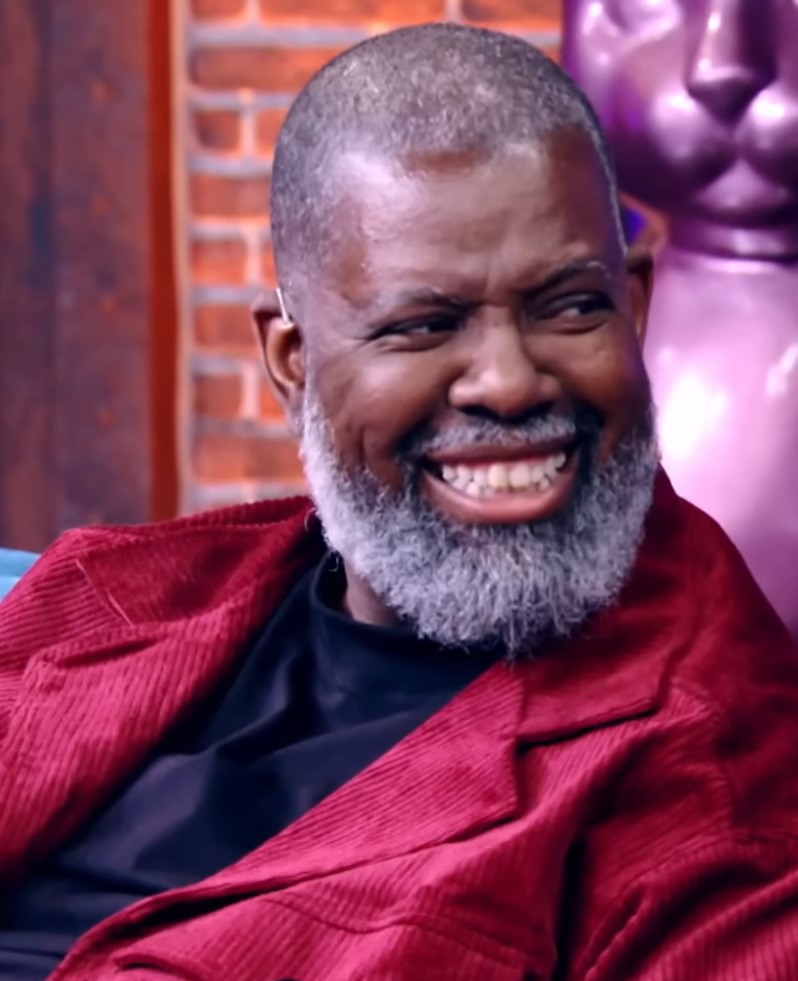
- Péricles in Lady Night 2025.

Background information
- Born: Péricles Aparecido Fonseca da Faria; 22 June 1969 (age 56); Santo André, SP
- Genres: pagode; samba
- Years active: 1986–present

Péricles Aparecido Fonseca de Faria, also known as Péricles, or Periclão (born in Santo André, July 22, 1969), is a Brazilian singer, composer and instrumentist of pagode, a subgenre of samba. He was the vocalist of Exaltasamba since the band's formation, in 1982, until late February 2012, when he decided to follow a solo career.

== Biography ==
Péricles is a former vocalist of Exaltasamba. He's also an instrumentist and a composer. Before his musical career, he worked in two state schools as a class inspector and for a car manufacturer in São Bernardo do Campo. Péricles is the father of singer Lucas Morato, and is currently married to Lidiane Santos.

== Career ==
In 2018, he debuted as samba-enredo interpreter, sharing the microphone of Mangueira with Ciganerey. In the same year, he created the "Canal do Periclão", a direct link with his fans on YouTube, where he discusses various topics. Péricles founded his office, Farias Produções, and since then, managed his own career. His album Em Sua Direção, launched in 2018, was nominated for a Grammy Latino in the category Best Samba/Pagode Album. The discs tour was managed by Lázaro Ramos.

== Discography ==
=== Solo career ===
Albums
Year	Title	Format	Record company	Sales
2012	Sensações	CD, DVD, Blu-ray	Som Livre	+ 112 000
2013	Nos Arcos da Lapa	CD e DVD	Som Livre	+ 22 500
2015	Feito Pra Durar	CD	FVA Music	+ 101 250
2017	Deserto da Ilusão	CD	FVA Music	+ 350
2018	Acústico	EP	Independente	
2018	Em Sua Direção	CD	Independente	+ 30 000
2019	Pagode do Pericão	CD	Independente	
2019	Mensageiro do Amor	CD e DVD	Independente	

Participations
Year	Title	Format	Record Company
2009	O Baile do Simonal	CD and DVD	EMI
2012	Turnê – 23º Prêmio da Música Brasileira – Homenagem a João Bosco	CD	Universal Music
2014	Turnê 25º Prêmio de Música Brasileira – Homenagem ao samba	CD and DVD	Universal Music

=== With Exaltasamba ===
Albums
Year	Title	Format	Record company
1992	Eterno Amanhecer	LP and CD	Kaskata's Records
1994	Encanto	LP and CD	Kaskata's Records
1996	Luz do Desejo	LP and CD	EMI-Odeon
1997	Desliga e Vem	CD	EMI-Odeon
1998	Cartão Postal	CD	EMI-Odeon
2000	Mais uma Vez	CD	EMI-Music
2001	Bons Momentos	CD	EMI
2002	Exaltasamba Ao vivo	CD	EMI
2003	Alegrando a Massa	CD	EMI
2005	Esquema Novo	CD	EMI
2006	Todos os Sambas Ao vivo	CD and DVD	EMI
2007	Livre pra Voar	CD	EMI
2007	Ao Vivo Pagode do Exalta	CD and DVD	EMI
2009	Ao Vivo na Ilha da Magia	CD, DVD and Blu-ray	EMI
2010	Roda de Samba do Exalta	CD	Som Livre
2010	Exaltasamba – 25 Anos Ao Vivo	LP, CD, DVD and Blu-ray	Som Livre and Radar Records
2011	Tá Vendo Aquela Lua	CD	Radar Records
2012	Multishow Ao Vivo – Despedida	CD, DVD and Blu-ray	Radar Records

Singles
Year	Title	Best Position	Album
Year	Title	BRA	Album
2012	"Amei"	14	Sensações
2012	"Linguagem dos Olhos"	31	Sensações
2012	"Depois da Briga"	33	Sensações
2013	"Cuidado Cupido" (With Luan Santana)	17	Sensações
2013	"Aquela Foto"	64	Sensações
2013	"Se Eu Largar o Freio"	39	Nos Arcos da Lapa
2014	"Final de Tarde"	51	Nos Arcos da Lapa
2014	"Êta Amor" (With Xande de Pilares)	40	Nos Arcos da Lapa
2015	"Erro Meu"	33	Feito Pra Durar
2015	"Feito Pra Durar"	40	Feito Pra Durar
2015	"Melhor Eu Ir"	10	Feito Pra Durar
2016	"Dois Rivais" (Part. Hellen Caroline)	83	Feito Pra Durar
2016	"Lembranças de Nós Dois"	67	Feito Pra Durar
2017	"Costumes Iguais"	82	Deserto da Ilusão
2017	"Vai Por Mim" (With. Marília Mendonça)	97	Deserto da Ilusão
2018	"Até Que Durou"	35	Em Sua Direção
2018	"Logo de Manhã"	40	Em Sua Direção
2019	"Hoje Tem"	36	Em Sua Direção
2019	"No Fundo dos Meus Olhos" (With Thiaguinho)	35	Pagode do Pericão
2019	"Ninguém Ama"	41	Mensageiro do Amor
2019	"Casal Maluco" (With Jeniffer Nascimento)	33	Mensageiro do Amor
2020	"Tô Achando Que é Amor"	33	TBA

Promotional singles
Year	Title	Best Position	Album
Year	Title	BRA	Album
2012	"Minha Razão" (ft. Chitãozinho & Xororó)	32	Avenida Brasil
2012	"Dança do Bole-Bole"	64	Salve Jorge
2015	"Quando o Morcego Doar Sangue"	—	A Regra do Jogo
2016	"Tiro ao Álvaro"	—	Haja Coração
