= Cacique de Ramos =

Brazilian carnival parade

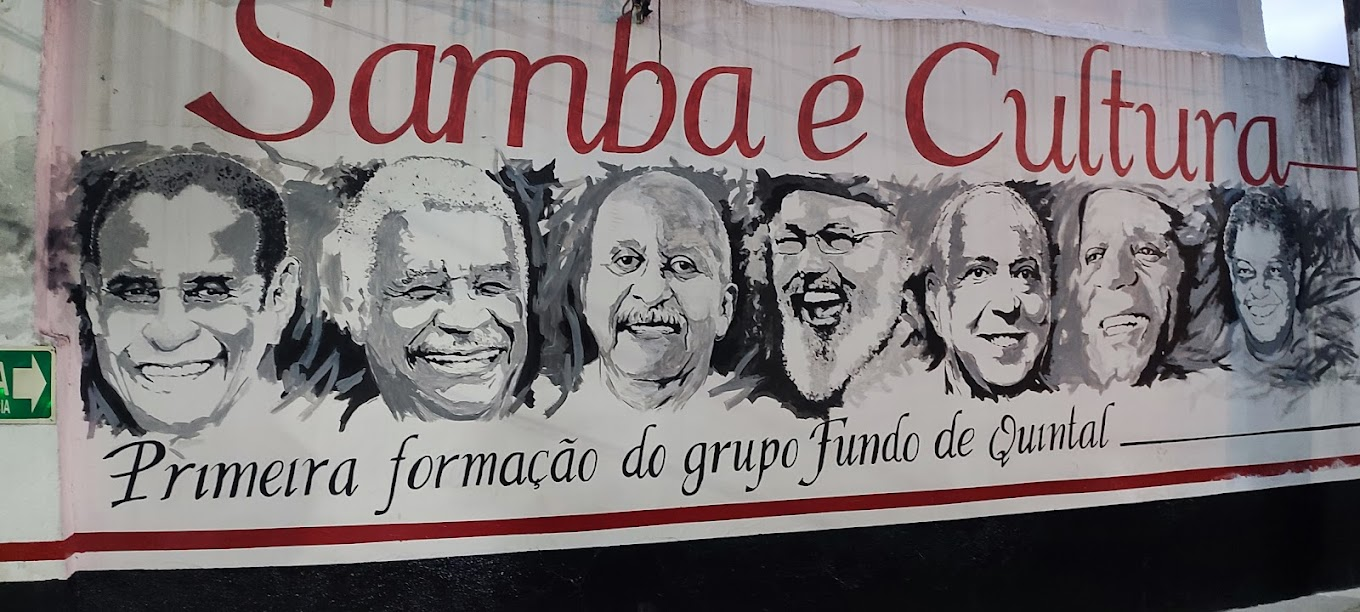
- Wall celebrating the first generation of samba musicians from Cacique do Ramos.
- Foundation: January 20, 1961
- Location: Olaria, Rio de Janeiro, Rio de Janeiro, Brazil

Website
- https://caciquederamos.com.br/ (in Portuguese)

Cacique de Ramos is one of the best known and most traditional carnival blocks in Rio de Janeiro, Brazil.

== History ==
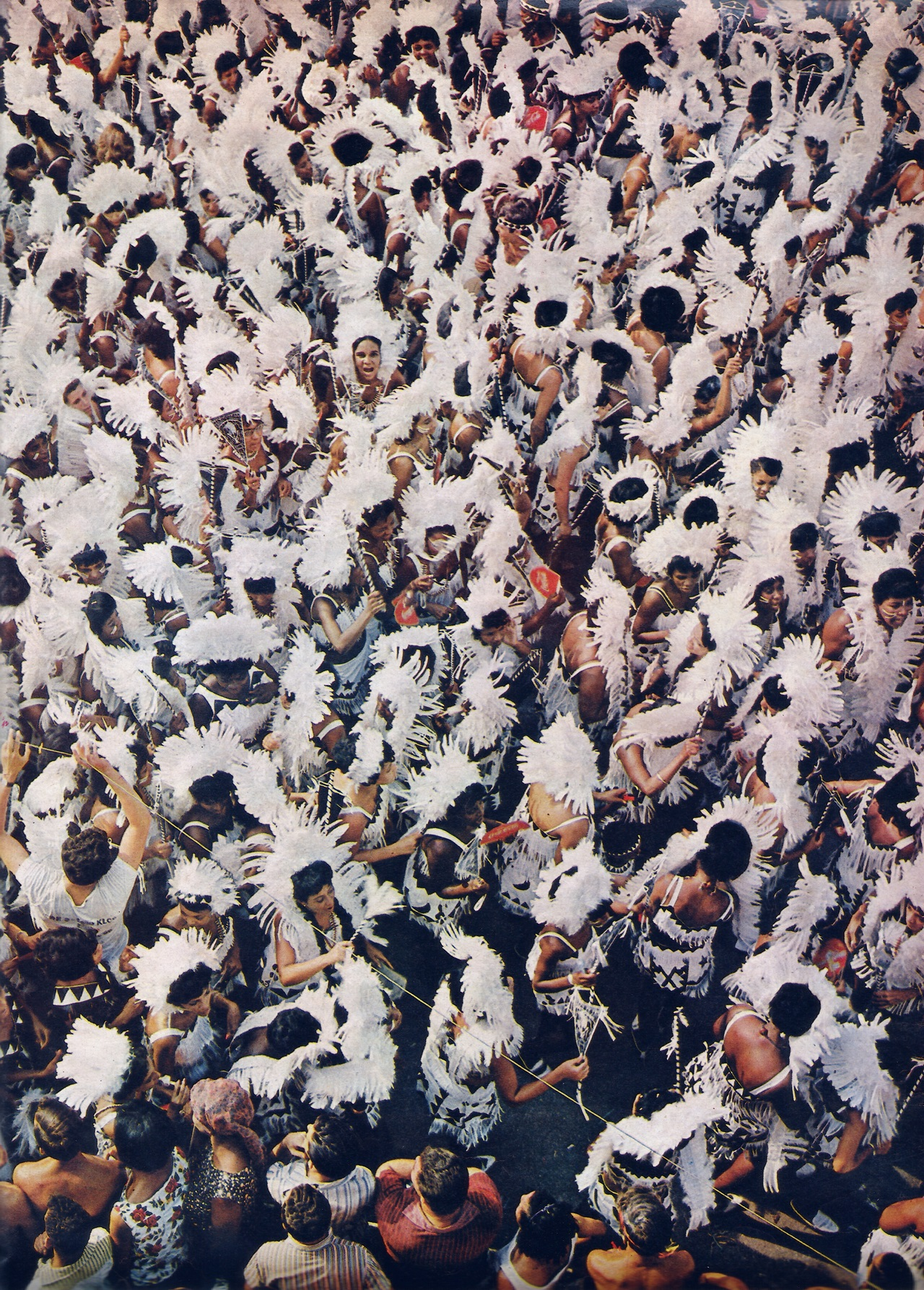
Cacique de Ramos block in 1966.

The first headquarters of the Cacique de Ramos was on Gomensoro Street. It then moved to 1326 Uranos Street in the Olaria neighborhood, in Rio de Janeiro city, where it remains to this day. Founded on January 20, 1961, it is one of the city's main carnival blocks.

Among its members are members of the samba group Fundo de Quintal, which originated from the bloco itself, and Zeca Pagodinho. Samba singer Beth Carvalho is another product of the bloco, which honored her by electing her as its godmother. Several other singers and composers are part of the bloco, including: Almir Guineto, Jorge Aragão, Marquinho Sathan, Arlindo Cruz, Sombrinha, Jovelina Pérola Negra, and Luiz Carlos da Vila.

In 2011, the group received the Tiradentes Medal, an honor awarded by Legislative Assembly of Rio de Janeiro (Alerj) through state representative Bebeto (PDT), for representing the culture of the state of Rio de Janeiro. During the 2012 Rio Carnival, the group was honored by the Estação Primeira de Mangueira samba school for its 50th anniversary. Mangueira finished the competition in seventh place, with Unidos da Tijuca winning the competition.

Until 2014, Cacique de Ramos paraded on Avenida Rio Branco, where the gathering point was on the corner with Avenida Presidente Vargas. Currently, the school parades on Avenida República do Chile on Sundays, Mondays, and Tuesdays during Carnival, at 8 p.m. In 2019, Cacique was awarded the Pedro Ernesto Medal, an honor granted by the Municipal Chamber of Rio de Janeiro, through Councilman Tarcísio Motta (PSOL).

In 2025, with the death of one of the main founders of Cacique de Ramos, Bira Presidente, the parade circuit on Avenida Chile was renamed in honor of Bira Presidente, christening the location ‘Circuito Bira Presidente’. The initiative came from a decree issued by Mayor Eduardo Paes (PSD).
