= Leci Brandão =

Brazilian politician, singer and composer

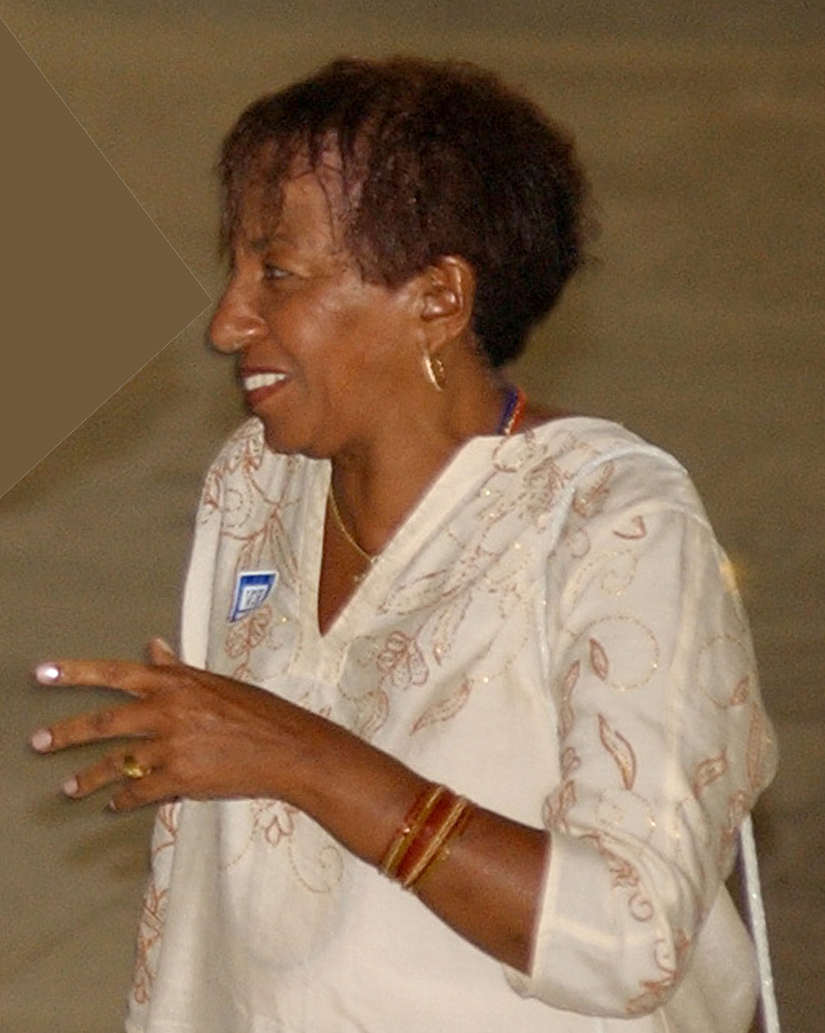

State Deputy of São Paulo
- Incumbent
- Assumed office March 15, 2011
- Constituency: At-large

Personal details
- Born: Leci Brandão da Silva; September 12, 1944 (age 82) Rio de Janeiro, Brazil
- Party: PCdoB (since 2010)
- Occupation: Musician, singer, composer, actress, politician
- Website: www.lecibrandao.com.br
- Musical career
- Genre: Samba
- Instrument: Vocals
- Years active: 1970–present

Leci Brandão (Portuguese pronunciation: [leˈsi brɐ̃nˈdɐ̃w], Rio de Janeiro, September 12, 1944) is a Brazilian politician, singer and composer of Brazilian Popular Music (Música Popular Brasileira or MPB). She is the daughter of Dona Lecy (Lecy de Assumpção Brandão). Her performance of "Quero Sim" won the National Meeting of Samba Composers in 1973 and her debut album came out in 1974. She received other awards during her career and, in the 1980s, she became a popular commentator for Brazil's TV channel's coverage of famous samba school carnival parades.

One of Leci Brandão's latest performances was in 2005 with Raça Brasileira: 20 Anos (DVD: 'Raca Brasileira', rated NR, one hour/2005) with many other Brazilian samba greats (i.e. Beth Carvalho, Arlindo Cruz, Almir Guineto, etc.).

As a Black Brazilian, a woman, and an artist, Leci Brandão has long taken opportunities to declare herself against racism and all other forms of discrimination. She came out as gay in an interview in 1978. She has lent her name, voice and cache by performing in LGBT events against homophobia. In the 2012 carnival, she was honored by the Escola de samba Acadêmicos do Tatuapé.

== Political career ==
She was a councillor on race equality and women's rights for President Lula's first government.

In February 2010, Leci Brandão joined the Communist Party of Brazil (PCdoB) and ran for State Representative for the state of São Paulo, being elected with over 85,000 votes, reelected in 2014 with 71,000 votes, in 2018 with over 64,000, and in 2022 with 90,496 votes. With her last re-election, Leci became the first black woman to serve 4 consecutive terms in the history of ALESP.

As a parliamentarian, Leci Brandão claims to be dedicated to promoting racial equality, respect for religions of African matrix, and Brazilian culture. The second black congresswoman in the history of the Legislative Assembly of São Paulo (the first was Dr. Theodosina Rosário Ribeiro), Leci also raises the issue of indigenous and quilombola populations, youth, women, and the LGBTQ+ segment.

And in 2019, Leci was one of the deputies to sign the PL of the project "Menstruation without taboo", which aimed to combat menstrual poverty through the distribution of pads for women in poverty along the lines of countries like Scotland.

== Discography ==
- (1974) A música de Donga • Discos Marcus Pereira (pt) • LP
- (1974) Leci Brandão • Selo Marcus Pereira • Compacto Duplo
- (1975) Antes que eu volte a ser nada • Selo Marcus Pereira • LP
- (1976) Questão de gosto • Polydor • LP
- (1977) Coisas do meu pessoal • Polydor • LP
- (1979) Metades • Polydor • LP
- (1980) Essa tal criatura • Polydor • LP
- (1985) Leci Brandão • Copacabana Discos (pt) • LP
- (1987) Dignidade • Copacabana Discos • LP
- (1988) Um beijo no seu coração • Copacabana Discos • LP
- (1989) As coisas que mamãe me ensinou • Copacabana Discos • LP
- (1990) Cidadã brasileira • Copacabana Discos • CD
- (1995) Anjos da guarda • RGE • CD
- (1995) Atitudes • RGE • CD
- (1996) Sucessos de Leci Brandão • Copacabana Discos • CD
- (1996) Somos da mesma tribo • Movieplay (pt) • CD
- (1999) Auto-estima • Trama Music (pt) • CD
- (2000) Os melhores do ano II – ao vivo • Indie Records • CD
- (2000) Eu sou assim • Trama • CD
- (2000) Casa de samba 4 • Universal Music • CD
- (2001) Leci & convidados • Indie Records • CD
- (2002) Jorge Aragão ao vivo convida • Indie Records
- (2002) A filhada Dona Lecy – ao vivo • Indie Records • CD
- (2002) Os melhores do ano III • Indie Records • CD
- (2003) A cara do povo • Indie Records • CD
- (2007) Canções afirmativas – Ao vivo • Indie Records
- (2008) Eu e o Samba • Som Livre • CD
- (2010) Disney Adventures in Samba (participação) • Walt Disney Records • DVD
- (2010) Disney Adventures in Samba (participação) • Walt Disney Records • CD
- (2011) Isso é Leci Brandão (coletânea) • Microservice • CD
- (2011) O canto livre de Leci Brandão (coletânea) • Universal Music • CD
- (2011) Uma flor para Nelson Cavaquinho (participação) • Lua Music • CD
- (2017) Simples Assim – Leci Brandão • produção independente • CD

== Filmography ==
- 1996: Xica da Silva
- 2007: Antônia: O Filme
- 2010: Tropa de Elite 2 – O Inimigo Agora é Outro
- 2015: O Samba
