= Arlindo Cruz =

Brazilian musician and songwriter (1958–2025)

Arlindo Cruz OMC
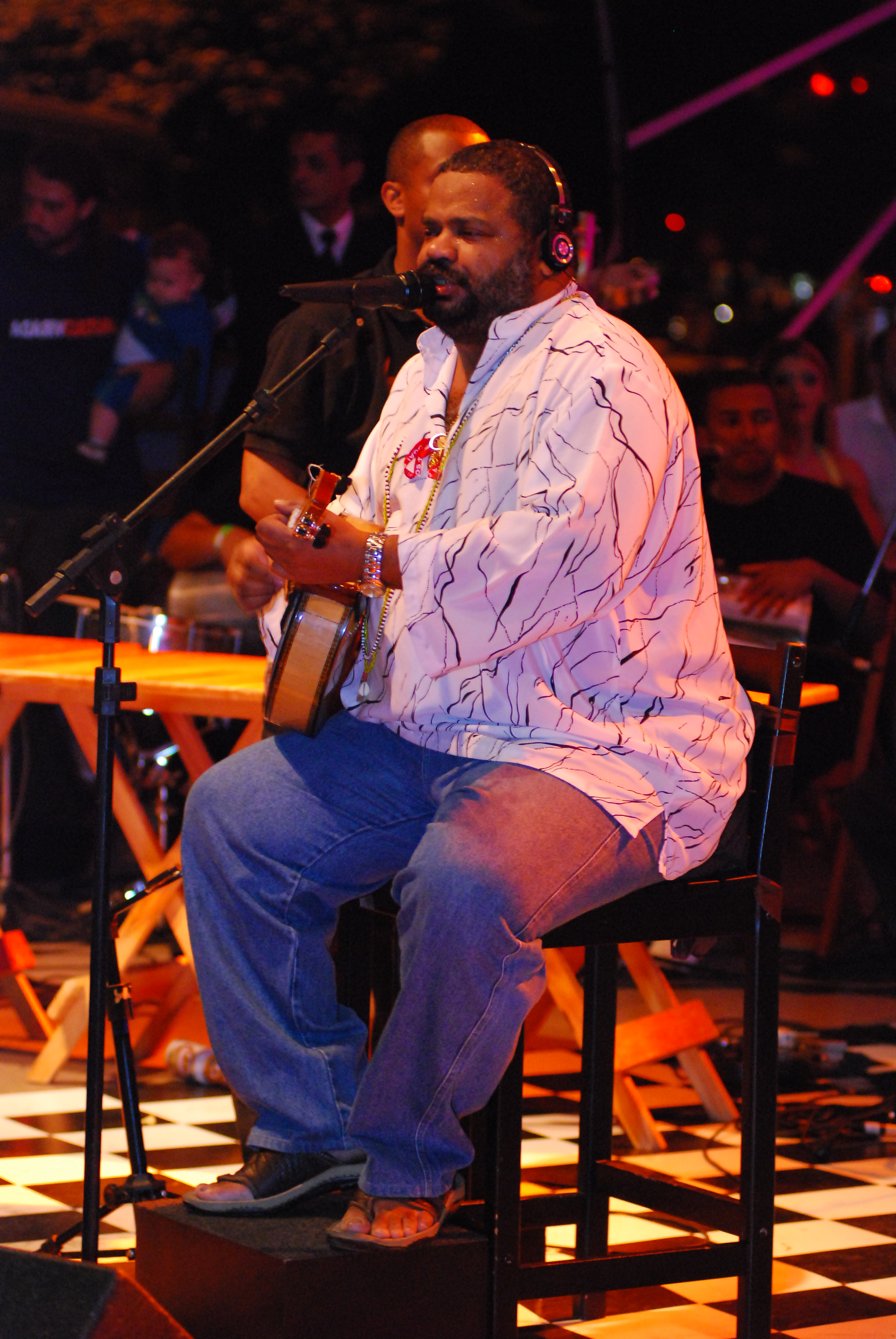
- Arlindo Cruz performing in 2008

Background information
- Born: Arlindo Domingos da Cruz Filho; 14 September 1958; Rio de Janeiro, Brazil
- Died: 8 August 2025 (aged 66) Rio de Janeiro, Brazil
- Genres: Samba, pagode, partido alto, MPB
- Occupations: Singer, songwriter
- Instruments: Cavaquinho, guitar
- Years active: 1981–2017
- Label: Universal Music
- Formerly of: Grupo Fundo de Quintal; Arlindo Cruz & Sombrinha
- Spouse: Babi Cruz (m. 2012)

Arlindo Domingos da Cruz Filho OMC (14 September 1958 – 8 August 2025) was a Brazilian musician and songwriter, working in the genre of samba and pagode. Cruz took part in the most important formation of Grupo Fundo de Quintal, and was considered one of the most important figures of the pagode movement.

== Early life and career ==
At the age of seven, Cruz was given his first musical instrument, the cavaquinho, by his father (Arlindão), a friend and partner of Candeia with whom he had founded the Mensageiros do Samba group. From age 7 to 12, Cruz already played by ear, learning chord voicing from his brother Acyr Marques' guitar playing. At 12, he went on to study classical guitar for 2 years at the Flor do Méier institution. About that time he started working professionally as a musician, on rodas de samba with various artists, especially Candeia who he considers to be his musical godfather. With Candeia he recorded a simple compact and an LP called 'Roda de Samba', playing cavaquinho.

With Jorge Aragão exiting Grupo Fundo de Quintal, Cruz was invited to join the group, an invitation which he accepted happily, dedicating himself during 12 years of success. Cruz played the banjo cavaquinho in the group and was one of the lead voices and songwriters, along with singer/songwriter Sombrinha, who played cavaquinho and guitar.

Arlindo Cruz had over 450 songs recorded by various artists, including Zeca Pagodinho, Maria Rita and Beth Carvalho. Cruz was also considered one of the most prolific banjo players to have ever dwelt in the samba scene, alongside Almir Guineto, with a great number of studio recordings for various artists, standing as a distinguished instrumentalist.

After leaving Grupo Fundo de Quintal in 1993, Cruz released one solo record. Soon afterwards, he joined his old partner Sombrinha in a quite successful partnership, Arlindo Cruz & Sombrinha, which lasted until ca. 2005.

In 2012, Arlindo Cruz recorded Tatu Bom De Bola, the official song for Fuleco the Armadillo, the official Mascot of 2014 FIFA World Cup, which took place in Brazil from 12 June to 13 July 2014.

In 2015, his album Herança Popular was nominated for the 16th Latin Grammy Awards in the Best Samba/Pagode Album category.

Arlindo Cruz proceeded in his solo career until 17 March 2017 when he suffered a stroke. It occurred when the musician was preparing himself to travel with his son to Osasco, São Paulo, as part of the project "Pagode 2 Arlindos". In the following year, he regained the movements of his mouth and could breathe by himself again by 2019.

== Death ==
Arlindo died at the Hospital Barra D'Or in Rio de Janeiro on August 8, 2025, at the age of 66, from multiple organ failure as a result of the stroke he suffered in 2017 and pneumonia. His funeral was scheduled for the following day at the Império Serrano samba school. After a procession through the streets of the city, the singer was buried in the early afternoon of August 10 at the Parque Jardim da Saudade Cemetery in Jardim Sulacap.

The mayor of Rio de Janeiro, Eduardo Paes, declared official mourning in the city and announced that the future Parque Piedade will be named after Arlindo Cruz.
