= Ring-repique =

Unpitched percussion instrument

Percussion instrument
- Inventor: Doutor
- Developed: 1970s

Related instruments
- Repinique; Hand-repique

Musicians
- Doutor

The ring-repique is a percussion instrument originated in Brazil. It is a small drum commonly made of aluminum, and unlike the hand-repique, has two drumheads (top and bottom, commonly made out of animal skin), and a different, much deeper timbre. In Brazil, this instrument is used mainly to play Samba and its variants, such as Pagode. The ring-repique has this name because traditionally, the musician wears one or more rings to play it, striking the body of the instrument with his fingers and using his thumb to play on the bottom or top skins. Normally the free hand hits the top skin, and this technique allows the player to perform more than one rhythm. The ring-repique was invented in Rio de Janeiro in the 1970s by musician Doutor.

== See also ==
- Repinique
- Hand-repique
