= Sunday (group) =

Brazilian musical group

- Origin: São Paulo, São Paulo, Brazil
- Genres: Pop rock
- Years active: 1970-present
- Members: Hélio Costa Manso; Vivian Costa Manso; Naná Fernandez; Eduardo Leão; Gel Fernandes
- Past members: Marcelo Caggiano; Fábio Gasparini; Carlinhos Marques; Márcio Negrão; Claúdio Negrão; Fábio Nestares

Sunday is a musical group from São Paulo, which recorded exclusively in English (from 1970 to 1975).

== Biography ==
The initial Sunday had several formations, including the following musicians: Helio Costa Manso (vocals, keyboards), Marcelo Caggiano (guitar), Fábio Gasparini (guitar), Vivian Costa Manso (vocals), Carlinhos Marques (guitar and vocals), Márcio Negrão (guitar and vocals), Claúdio Negrão (bass), Fábio Nestares (vocals, guitar) and Gel Fernandes (drums).

His hits were almost all re-recordings of foreign compositions, such as "Well All Right" by Buddy Holly (arranged by the English group Blind Faith), "I'm Gonna Get Married" by Lou Christie and "Sit Down I Think I Love You". of the Buffalo Springfield group. One of the group's compositions, "Hand By Hand (Side By Side)", was covered in Australia years later by Dawn Dixon.

Hélio Costa Manso, later on, was a producer for the RGE and Som Livre labels and achieved significant success recording and composing several soap opera themes for Rede Globo under the pseudonym Steve MacLean. Fabio Gasparini was Ted Gaz, guitarist for Magazine (Brazilian band) and Vivian Costa Manso, wife of Hélio, was a member of the Harmony Cats group for eleven years and also as the main singer of the famous orchestra Super Som T. A.

With "I'm gonna get married", in the 70s, Sunday received the award for the best selling album in Brazil. From 1980 to 1987, Sunday acted as a resident group at the Victoria Pub in São Paulo. In 1982 Sunday recorded a country music cd for Som Livre, under the name Midnight Ramblers. The opening theme of the soap opera "Os Imigrantes" shown on TV Bandeirantes was recorded by Sunday, and is part of the soundtrack LP. In the year 2000, Sunday participated in the Celebration 2000 event, at Clube Pinheiros, together with the following groups: Lee Jackson, Kompha, Memphis and Vat 69. This event was recorded on video, and distributed in DVD format. Sunday remains active until today.

== Discography ==
=== Albums ===
- 1972 - Sunday

=== Singles and EPs ===
- 1970 - I'm Gonna Get Married (compact)
- 1970 - Hand by Hand (Side by Side)/Rain
- 1970 - Well All Right/A Hard Way To Go
- 1971 - Let's Make A Prayer/All The Words To Me
- 1971 - Sit Down/I've Been A Bad Bad Boy/Children of My Mind/I'm Unhappy In This World
- 1973 - Coralie/Forgive My Love (The Carpet Baggers)
- 1978 - Only Ten Per Cent/Put It Out
- 1979 - Paloma/Nairobi Nights
- 1981 - Week By Week/Groovin
