= Jovelina Pérola Negra =

- Born: July 21, 1944; Rio de Janeiro, Brazil
- Died: November 2, 1998 (aged 54); Rio de Janeiro
- Genres: samba, partido-alto
- Occupation: singer-songwriter
- Instrument: voice

Jovelina Pérola Negra (July 21, 1944 – November 2, 1998), stage name of Jovelina Farias Belfort, was a Brazilian samba singer and songwriter. Known by her deep voice, she was a representative of the partido alto samba style, and considered an heir to Clementina de Jesus style of singing.

== Biography ==
Jovelina was born in Rio de Janeiro, at the Botafogo neighbourhood and raised in Belford Roxo. She worked as a housemaid until her forties and was a member of the samba school Império Serrano.

Jovelina debuted to fame presenting at the Vegas Sport Clube, in the Coelho Neto neighborhood; her friend Dejalmir gave her stage name Jovelina Pérola Negra (Jovelina Black Pearl).

She recorded five individual albums, earning a platinum certificate, and a number of compilations. Some of her recorded songs are "Feirinha da Pavuna", "Bagaço da Laranja" (with Zeca Pagodinho), "Luz do Repente", "No Mesmo Manto" and "Garota Zona Sul". Success came late in her life and she did not fulfill her dream of "earning a lot of money and giving her children everything she didn't have".

Jovelina died on November 2, 1998, at age 54, from a heart attack in her home in Pechincha.

== Honours ==
She was posthumously awarded the Order of Cultural Merit by the Brazilian Ministry of Culture in 2016. Her name was given to the Arena Carioca Jovelina Pérola Negra cultural center, in the Pavuna neighbourhood of Rio.

== Discography ==
Álbuns
Year	Title	Format	Label
1985	Jovelina Pérola Negra	LP	RGE
1985	Raça Brasileira (participation in three tracks)	LP	RGE
1986	Arte do Encontro	LP	Som Livre
1987	Luz do Repente	LP	RGE
1988	Sorriso Aberto	LP	RGE
1990	Amigos Chegados	CD	RGE
1991	Sangue Bom	CD	RGE
1993	Pagodão da Jovelina		
1993	Vou da Fé	CD	RGE
1996	Samba Guerreiro	CD	RGE
	Duetos		
2000	Grandes Sucessos	CD	RGE
2000	Pérola	CD	
2007	Jovelina Pérola Negra Duetos – É Isso Que Eu Mereço	CD	Som Livre
