= Steve Maclean =

- Born: Hélio Eduardo Castilho de Toledo da Costa Manso; Brazil
- Genres: ballad, rock
- Occupations: singer, composer, guitarist
- Instruments: vocal, classical guitar
- Years active: 1966–present
- Labels: RGE and Som Livre

Steve Maclean (born Hélio Eduardo Castilho de Toledo da Costa Manso), also known as Hélio Costa Manso, is a Brazilian singer. He was the lead singer, guitarist and leader of the rock group The Mustangs, formed in 1966 to record American songs not yet released in Brazil and known for hits such as "Sunny" and "See You In September".

In 1969, Hélio was the lead singer of the group Sunday when the group released a cover of Lou Christie's "I'm Gonna Get Married", which was number one for several weeks and was included in the soundtrack of the soap opera Super Plá, on the now-defunct Rede Tupi. With this song, the group won the award for best-selling album in 1971. It was on Sunday that Hélio met his wife Vivian Costa Manso, also a member and lead singer. Later, Manso pursued a solo career and changed his name to Steve Maclean. In the late 1970s, he had success with "Air For a Great Love" and "True Love". The latter song was the theme song for O Grito (a soap opera) on TV Globo in 1975, and Manso had another hit soon after, "Sweet Sounds Oh Beautiful Music", from the soap opera Locomotivas, on TV Globo, in 1977.

He was a director at RGE and later became director of Som Livre, a position he held for several years. Manso had songs of his own included in the soundtrack of Hit Parade, a series by André Barcinski that premiered in 2021 on Canal Brasil.

== Singles ==
List of singles
Title	Year
"Love Poem /There's No Words"	1971
"Forever Alone / Our Love, Our Happiness"	1976
"True Love / Air For A Great Love"	1976
"Sweet Sounds Oh! Beautiful Music / Our Love, Our Happiness / Thank You Dear / Fly"	1977
"Sweet Sounds Oh! Beautiful Music"	1977
"Places / Happiness"	1978
"Peace And Love / I've Gotta Get A Message To You	1981
