= Thiaguinho (singer) =

Brazilian musician (b. 1983)

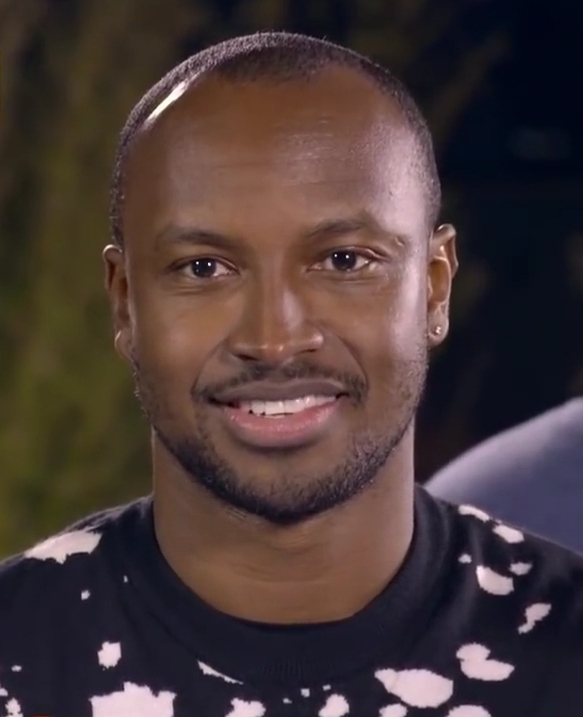
- Thiaguinho 2019

Background information
- Also known as: Thiaguinho
- Born: Thiago André Barbosa; March 11, 1983 (age 43); Presidente Prudente, SP
- Origin: Brazil
- Genre: Pagode
- Occupations: Singer, composer and presenter
- Years active: 1998–present
- Labels: Som Livre; FVA Music Solutions (In solo career)
- Formerly of: Exaltasamba
- Website: thiaguinho.net

Thiago André Barbosa better known as Thiaguinho (Presidente Prudente – São Paulo – Brazil, 11 March 1983), is a Brazilian pagode singer, composer and presenter. He first gained notoriety for participating in the talent show Fama in 2002 and became famous for being a member of the musical group Exaltasamba from 2003 to 2012. In 2012, he released his first solo album and live album, "Ousadia & Alegria", selling more than 80,000 copies and earning him a Latin Grammy nomination in the Best Samba/Pagode Album category. He released his second solo album, "Outro Dia, Outra História", in 2014 which sold 40,000 copies and earned a gold record certificate. His third album, "Hey, Mundo!" was released in 2015, and was a commercial success, selling more than 160,000 copies and going double platinum. His second live video recording, "VamoQVamo" was released in 2016. In the same year, he released another album called "Tardezinha". His "Só Vem" album was released in 2017 which sold 40,000 copies and earned him another gold record. He released "Tardezinha 2" in 2017, followed by his third live recording called "Vibe" in 2020.

== Story ==
=== Career ===
Thiaguinho learned how to play guitar with Isabella Ribeiro and started to compose at 12 years of age. By 14, he learned how to play cavaquinho. At 15, he had already formed his first samba group, Sabe Demais, later producing the group's first CD. In 2002, he was a contestant in the talent show Fama, produced by Rede Globo. In 2003 he joined Exaltasamba, replacing former singer Chrigor. With the group, he recorded ten CDs and 5 DVDs. In 2009 he participated in the recording of "O Baile do Simonal", where he performed the track "No galho do cajueiro" with group-mate Perícles. In 2010, the song "Valeu", written by him and Rodriguinho, won the Digital Music Award in the "Most Popular Music" category, the song "Valeu" was released by Exaltasamba. In 2012 he started his solo career, performing concerts at CrediCard Hall, in São Paulo, for the recording of his CD/DVD "Ousadia & Alegria". The album featured Gilberto Gil, Ivete Sangalo and soccer player Neymar. In 2014, Thiaguinho became the host of the TV show "Música Boa ao Vivo" on Multishow.

In 2015, together with Péricles, Thiaguinho, Chrigor, Pinha Presidente and Izaías (all former members of Exaltasamba) he participated in the tour "A Gente Faz A Festa".

More recently, he signed a record label deal with Virgin Music.

=== Biography ===
In 2011, during an appearance on the TV show Xuxa, he confirmed he was dating actress and fellow presenter Fernanda Souza. In February 2015, the couple got married at Igreja Nossa Senhora do Brasil, with 450 guests attending the ceremony. On October 14, 2019, the couple announced their divorce.

== TV ==
Programas
Ano	Title	Function	Note	TV station
2002	Fama	Himself	Participant	Rede Globo
2011	Malhação	Himself	Participation	Rede Globo
2012	Cheias de Charme	Himself	Special participation	Rede Globo
2013	Malhação	Himself	Special participation	Rede Globo
2014	Sai do Chão!	Presenter	Special participation	Rede Globo
2014	Geração Brasil	Himself/Presenter	Special participation	Rede Globo
2014	Música Boa Ao Vivo	Himself	Presenter	Multishow
2014	Vai Que Cola	Himself	Special participation	Multishow
2014	Gaby Estrella	Himself	Participation	Gloob
2014	Neymar	Neymar	Dubbing	Nickelodeon
2015	Superstar	Himself	Juror	Rede Globo
2017	TV Aparecida	Himself	Special participation	TV Aparecida
2017	Detetives do Predio Azul	Himself	Special participation (1 episode)	Gloob
2023	Travessia	Himself	Special participation (1 episode)	Rede Globo
2024	Mania de Você	Himself	Special participation (1 episode)	Rede Globo

== Discography ==
=== Solo career ===
All albums on this list were released by Som Livre, except 'Hey, Mundo'.

'Hey, Mundo' was launched by FVA Music Solutions

- 2012 Ousadia & Alegria
- 2013 Mais e Mais
- 2014 Outro Dia, Outra História
- 2015 Hey, Mundo
- 2016 #VamoQVamo
- 2017 Tardezinha
- 2018 Tardezinha 2

=== In Exaltasamba ===
Here, most of the albums were released by EMI, had album released by Som Livre and Radar Records

- 2003 Alegrando a Massa
- 2005 Esquema Novo
- 2006 Todos os Sambas ao Vivo
- 2007 Livre Pra Voar
- 2007 Pagode do Exalta ao Vivo
- 2009 Ao Vivo na Ilha da Magia
- 2010 Roda de Samba do Exalta
- 2010 25 Anos
- 2011 Tá Vendo Aquela Lua
