= Hand-repique =

Unpitched percussion instrument

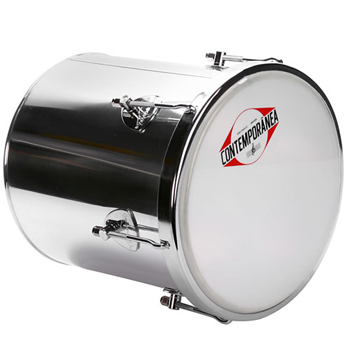
A hand-repique

The hand-repique is a percussion instrument originated in Brazil. It’s a small drum of cylindrical form, that can be made of wood, aluminum or acrylic. It’s played with the hands, both on the skin and its body. The hand-repique has a sharp sound and is used mainly to play Samba and its variants, such as Pagode. Its common role inside these genres is to increase the percussion section, filling up the spaces and playing the off-beats. It was invented by musician Ubirany, founder and percussionist with the band "Fundo de Quintal". The hand-repique is derived from another percussion instrument, the "Repinique". Ubirany started to use the repinique in its band but felt it was too uncomfortable to play, since this instrument is made to be originally played with a drumstick. So he adapted it, adding a few mufflers on the inside, lowering the hoop and taking the bottom skin off it. It became so popular that it began to be produced by several manufactures (such as Gope, Contemporânea and Izzo), evolving away from the original repinique.

== See also ==
- Repinique
- Ring-repique
