= Renato da Rocinha =

- Born: Renato Baptista dos Santos; September 21, 1978 (age 47); Rocinha, Rio de Janeiro, Brazil
- Genres: Samba
- Occupations: Singer, songwriter
- Years active: 2010–present
- Website: http://www.zecapagodinho.com.br

Renato Baptista dos Santos, better known by the name Renato da Rocinha (Rio de Janeiro, September 21, 1978), is a Brazilian samba singer and songwriter.

== Career ==
Renato was born and raised in the Rocinha community of Rio de Janeiro, and frequented several samba wheels in the city as a child, alongside his father. At 16, when he was working as an assistant at a car dealership, he took a course in radio presenting, later helping as an audio operator for Rocinha community radio locator, Avelino da Silva. On the radio, he was responsible for the program "Papo de Samba", without qualifying several known sambistas in the carioca scenario.

He was a radio announcer and official voice of the Academic da Rocinha samba school for three years. In 2010, he released his first CD, "Anywhere", performed at the samba school G.R.E.S. Academics of Rocinha. In 2015, being an independent singer and songwriter, he released the CD "Moleque Bom".

In the year 2019, Renato released the album in honor of his 10 years of career, "Renato da Rocinha 10 years (Live)", which featured his main hits and several special appearances, such as Xande de Pilares, João Martins, Galocantô, and Arlindinho, among others.
