= Xande de Pilares =

- Xande de Pilares at the 2026 Latin Grammy Awards

Background information
- Born: Alexandre Silva de Assis; 25 December 1969 (age 56); Rio de Janeiro, Brazil
- Genres: Pagode, Samba
- Occupations: Singer; Composer; Actor
- Years active: 1991–present

Alexandre Silva de Assis (born 25 December 1969), better known by his artistic name Xande de Pilares, is a Brazilian singer, composer, and actor. He became famous for his work as a member of Grupo Revelação, which he was a member of from 1991 to 2014.

== Biography ==
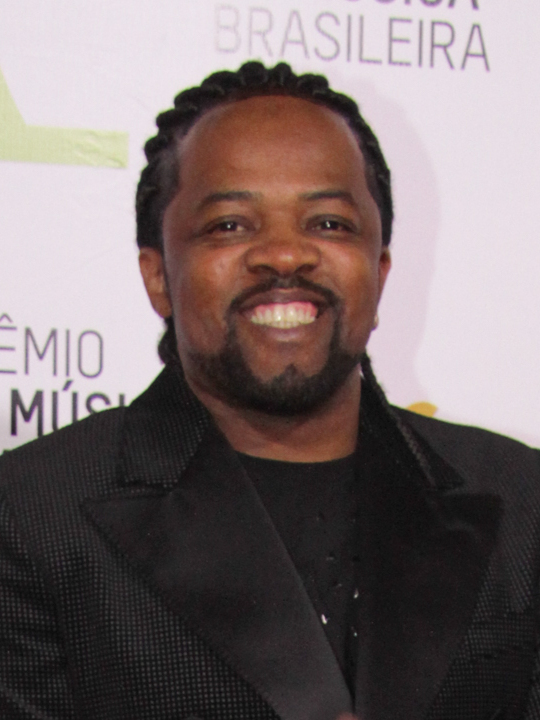
Xande de Pilares at the Prêmio da Música Brasileira in 2015.

Xande de Pilares was born on 25 December 1969 in Rio de Janeiro. Until he went to live in the neighborhood of Pilares, from which partly inspired his stage name, Xande lived in various other neighborhoods. Part of his childhood was spent living in the community of Chacrinha, located in the complex of Morro do Turano in the Tijuca neighborhood, passing part of his time with Acadêmicos do Salgueiro samba school; he stayed there until his house was destroyed in a storm. He would have to move afterwards to Morro do Andaraí, and afterwards, in the city of São Gonçalo.

In 1981, as he almost became a teenager, he moved to the favela of Águia de Ouro in Pilares, where he adopted part of his stage name. He would go on to later reside afterwards in Favela do Jacarezinho.

Xande took part in professional activities in general cleaning services, and it was during this time period, starting on 20 January 1990, that he made his debut in Pagode da Tia Gessy, based in the Cachambi neighborhood, beginning his musical career. He appeared on Rádio Tropical do Rio de Janeiro, at that time an important broadcaster of samba and pagode, and he became a recurring guest on these live programs.

He launched Grupo Revelação four years later in 1994 together with five colleagues playing instruments. The group became known for their weekly pagode sessions done while with the samba school Acadêmicos da Abolição. Later on, they launched their first album in 1999; They would go on to make nine new albums and 4 DVDs.

On 28 October 2014, Xande released his first solo album through Universal Music. The album, titled Perseverança contained 14 tracks with music composed by Xande himself and names such as Serginho Meriti and Arlindo Cruz. "I'm happy with my life with this new phase", with the singer explaining that the opening gives its name to the album and recounts a little bit of his story.

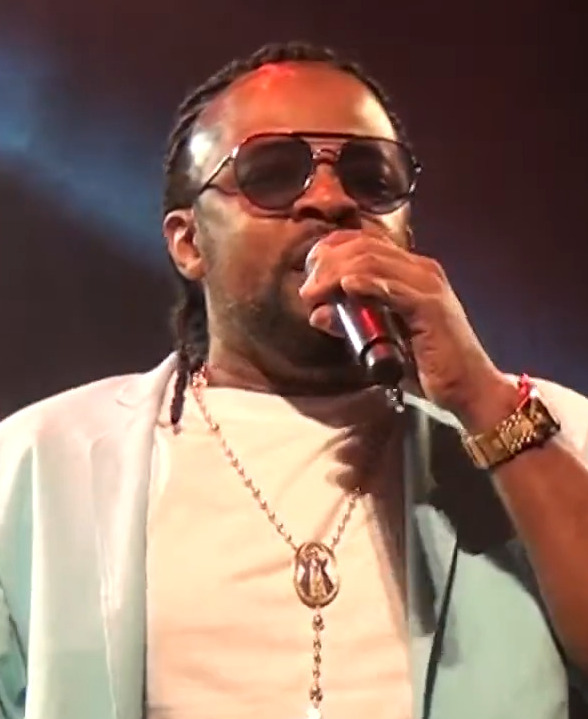
Xande de Pilares in 2022.

In 2017, he released his second album, titled Esse Menino Sou Eu. The album contains 17 tracks, 7 of which he authored and included the hit "Tem Que Provar Que Merece", one of the themes of the 2016 Olympic Games in Rio de Janeiro. He would later release singles such as "Gratidão" and "Fã do Amor da Gente", along with three more live albums.

In 2023, he would release his album Xande Canta Caetano, with reimaginings of songs by Caetano Veloso. It was chosen by the São Paulo Art Critics Association as one of the 50 best Brazilian albums in 2023.

=== Acting career ===
In 2014, Xande acted in the comedy Made in China, by Estevão Ciavatta, where he played Carlos Eduardo.

In 2022, Xande acted in the telenovela 'Todas as Flores', which was streamed through Globoplay. His character, Darci, is a carnival organizer and gatekeeper who is married to Chininha and is considered "an example of a family man".

== Personal life ==
Xande is the father of two children. In 2020, he began a relationship with blogger and digital influencer Thay Pereira (known online as Mikimbeth). Xande is the uncle of Jonathan Alexandre, a current vocalist with Grupo Revelação. He also had a brief relationship with singer Simony.

== Discography ==
=== Solo ===
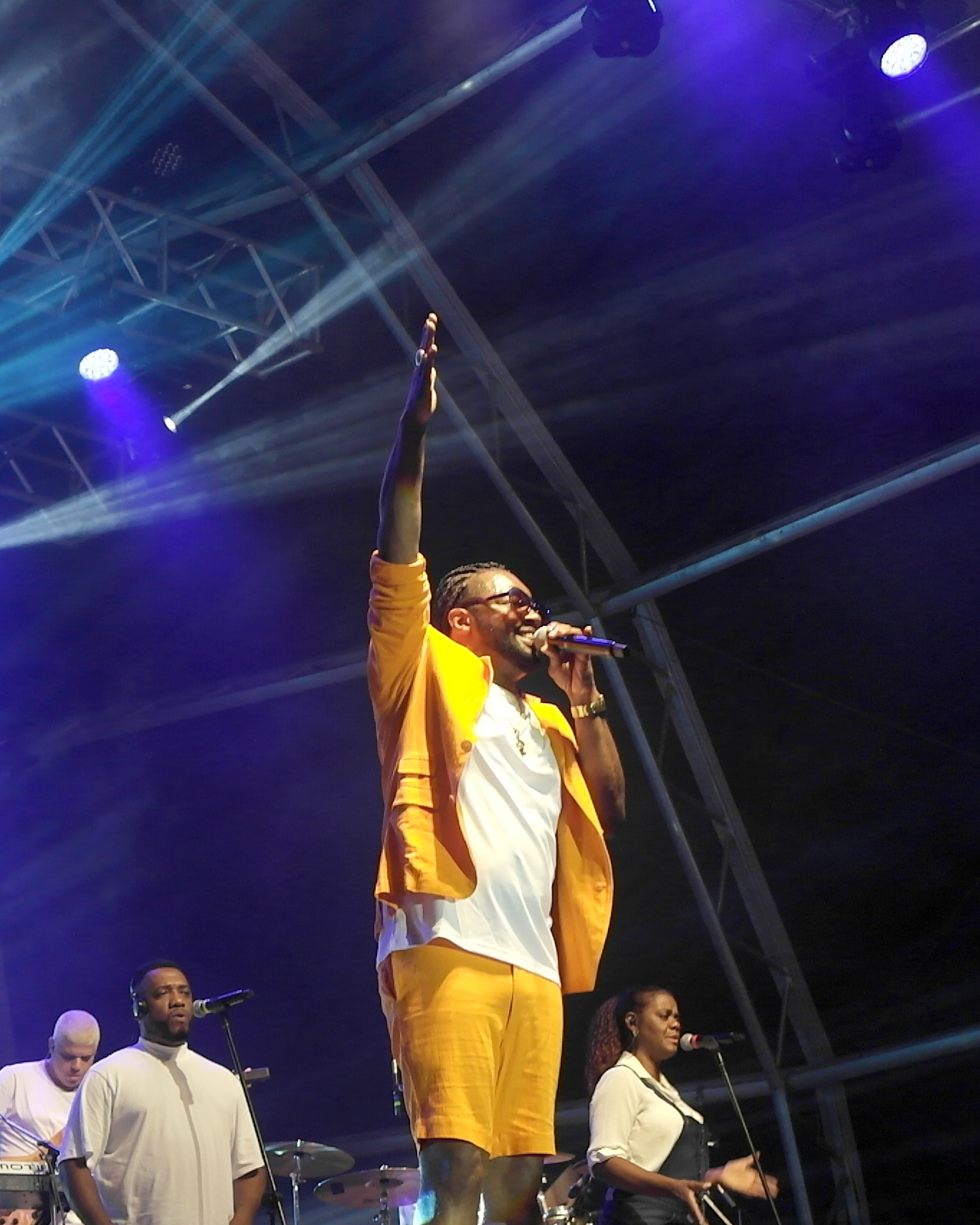
Xande de Pilares live in Angra dos Reis (2022)

Albums
Year	Title	Medium	Label
2014	Perseverança	CD	Universal Music
2017	Esse Menino Sou Eu	CD	Universal Music
2020	Nos Braços do Povo – Ao Vivo	CD and streaming	Universal Music
2022	Pagode da Tia Gessy – Que Samba Bom (Ao Vivo)	CD and streaming	Gold Produções
2023	Esse Menino Sou Eu – Ao Vivo	CD, DVD and streaming	Gold Produções
2023	Xande Canta Caetano	CD and streaming	Gold Produções

=== With Grupo Revelação ===
Albums
Year	Title	Medium	Label
2000	Revelação	CD	
2001	Nosso Samba Virou Religião	CD	
2002	Ao Vivo no Olimpo	CD	Deckdisc
2002	O Melhor Do Pagode De Mesa	CD	Deckdisc
2003	Novos Tempos	CD	Deckdisc
2004	Ao Vivo – Na Palma da Mão	CD	Deckdisc
2005	Maxximum: Grupo Revelação	CD	Deckdisc
2005	Ao Vivo no Olimpo	DVD	Deckdisc
2006	Velocidade da Luz	CD	Deckdisc
2007	100% Revelação	CD	Deckdisc
2008	Aventureiro	CD	Deckdisc
2009	Ao Vivo no Morro	CD e DVD	Deckdisc
2010	Ao Vivo no Morro	CD e DVD	Universal
2012	360° Ao Vivo	CD e DVD	Universal

== Carnival ==
=== Victories in Carnival competition ===
Year	Samba school	Samba-enredo	Ref.
2014	Acadêmicos do Salgueiro	Gaia – A Vida em Nossas Mãos	
2015	Acadêmicos do Salgueiro	Do Fundo do Quintal, Saberes e Sabores na Sapucaí	
2018	Acadêmicos do Salgueiro	Senhoras do Ventre do Mundo	
2018	Unidos de Padre Miguel	O Eldorado Submerso: Delírio Tupi-Parintintin	
2022	Vai-Vai	Sankofá	
2025	Império Serrano	O Que Espanta Miséria É Festa	
2025	Acadêmicos do Salgueiro	Salgueiro de Corpo Fechado	

=== As samba-enredo interpreter ===
Year	School	Ref.
2013 - 2018	Acadêmicos do Salgueiro	
2025	Águia de Ouro	

== Filmography ==
=== Television ===
Year	Title	Role	Notes
2022–2023	Todas as Flores	Darci Pereira	
2024	Encantado's	Ele mesmo	Episode: "Gurufim"
2024	Tô Nessa!	Ele mesmo	Episode: "13 de outubro"
2024	Volta por Cima	Ele mesmo	Episodes: "17–20 de dezembro"

=== Film ===
Year	Title	Role	Notes
2014	Made in China	Carlos Eduardo	

== Awards ==
- Gold standard
1. 2014 – Best Samba-enredo (Salgueiro – "Gaia – A Vida em Nossas Mãos")
- Star of Carnival
1. 2018 – Best Samba-enredo (Unidos de Padre Miguel – "Eldorado Submerso: Delírio Tupi-Parintintin")
- Silver Cat
1. 2014 – Best Samba-enredo (Salgueiro – "Gaia – A Vida em Nossas Mãos")
- Highlight of the Year Award
1. 2024 – Composer
- S@mba-Net
1. 2018 – Best Samba-enredo (Unidos de Padre Miguel – "Eldorado Submerso: Delírio Tupi-Parintintin")
- Golden Tambourine
1. 2014 – Best Samba-enredo (Salgueiro – "Gaia – A Vida em Nossas Mãos")
- Sambario Trophy
1. 2018 – Best Samba-enredo (Unidos de Padre Miguel – "Eldorado Submerso: Delírio Tupi-Parintintin")
- Sambista Trophy
1. 2018 – Best Samba-enredo (Unidos de Padre Miguel – "Eldorado Submerso: Delírio Tupi-Parintintin")
- Explosão in Samba Trophy
1. 2025 – Best Samba-enredo (Salgueiro – "Salgueiro de Corpo Fechado")
- Band FoliaTrophy
1. 2025 – Best Samba-enredo (Império Serrano – "O Que Espanta Miséria É Festa")
- Tupi Trophy
1. 2025 – Best Samba-enredo (Império Serrano – "O Que Espanta Miséria É Festa")
