= Fundo de Quintal =

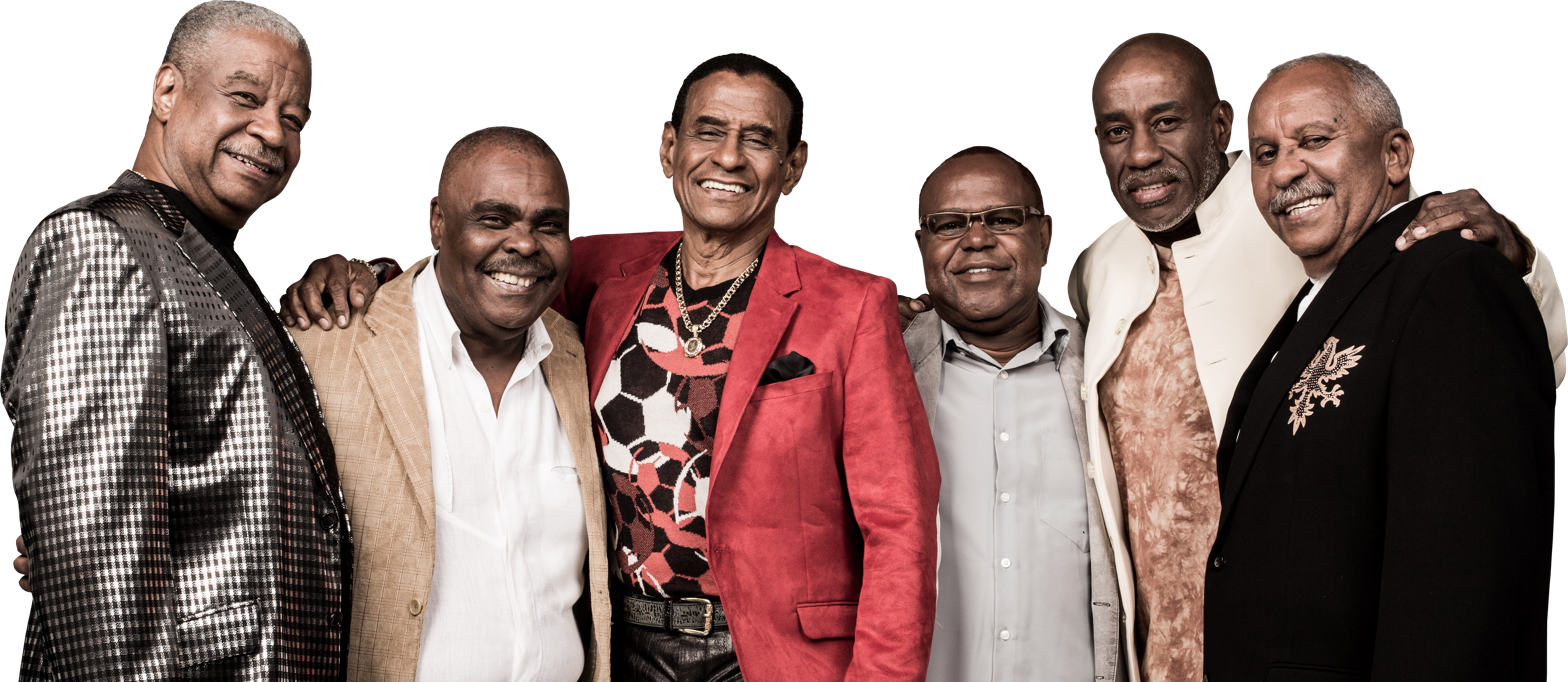
- Fundo de Quintal in 2015

Background information
- Origin: Rio de Janeiro, Brazil
- Genres: Samba; pagode
- Years active: 1978–present
- Website: fundodequintal.com.br

Grupo Fundo de Quintal or simply Fundo de Quintal (Backyard Group, roughly) is a Brazilian samba band formed in Rio de Janeiro in the late 1970s.

== History ==
The founding members of Fundo de Quintal, Almir Guineto (banjo/cavaco), Bira Presidente (pandeiro), Jorge Aragão (acoustic guitar), Neoci (tan-tan), Sereno (tan-tan), Sombrinha (acoustic guitar/chip) and Ubirany (hand-repique), used to perform on Wednesdays in the sambas at the headquarters of the carnival block Cacique de Ramos in the mid-1970s. With the introduction of such instruments as the tan-tan, hand-repique and banjo, the group created a completely innovative style in samba (which, later on, the Brazilian music industry called pagode).

Patronized by the famous samba singer Beth Carvalho, Fundo de Quintal recorded its first album, Samba É No Fundo de Quintal, in 1980. Shortly thereafter, Almir Guineto and Jorge Aragão left the group to pursue a solo career, in addition to Neoci, who soon died. Arlindo Cruz (banjo / cavaco) and Walter Sete Cordas (acoustic guitar) joined the band, which recorded its second album, Samba É No Fundo de Quintal Vol. 2, in 1981. But Walter Sete Cordas left soon after, having been replaced by Cleber Augusto (acoustic guitar). The lineup of Arlindo Cruz, Sombrinha, Cleber Augusto, Sereno, Bira Presidente and Ubirany recorded seven studio albums and one live album between 1983 and 1990.

Following the departure of Sombrinha, Fundo de Quintal recruited Mário Sérgio (cavaco) just as Ademir Batera (drummer) joined the group, having debuted on the LP É Aí Que Quebra a Rocha, released the following year. In 1992, Arlindo Cruz left Fundo de Quintal, which recruited Ronaldinho (banjo). The new lineup of Mário Sérgio, Ronaldinho, Cleber Augusto, Sereno, Bira Presidente and Ubirany recorded eight studio albums and two live albums between 1993 and 2002, the year in which Cleber Augusto left the group for health reasons.

In 2008, it was Mário Sérgio who left the band to pursue a solo career, but he returned five years later. However, he died in 2016, a victim of cancer. Even with the departure of Ronaldinho in 2018, Fundo de Quintal has been active, with two new members Júnior Itaguay (banjo) and Márcio Alexandre (cavaco), in addition to the remaining Ademir Batera, Sereno, Bira Presidente and Ubirany who died in 2020. Bira Presidente died on 14 July 2025, at the age of 88.

== Band members ==
=== Current members ===
- Sereno – tan-tan, vocals (1978–present)
- Ademir Batera – drums (1991–present)
- Júnior Itaguay – banjo, lead vocals (2019–present)
- Márcio Alexandre – cavaco, lead vocals (2019–present)

=== Former members ===
- Almir Guineto – banjo, cavaco, vocals (1978–1980; died 2017)
- Jorge Aragão – acoustic-guitar, vocals (1978–1980)
- Neocy – tan-tan, vocals (1978–1980; died 1981)
- Sombrinha – cavaco, acoustic-guitar, lead vocals (1978–1990)
- Bira Presidente – pandeiro, vocals (1978–2025; died 2025)
- Ubirany – hand-repique, vocals (1978–2020; died 2020)
- Walter 7 Cordas – acoustic-guitar, vocals (1980–1982)
- Arlindo Cruz – banjo, cavaco, lead vocals (1980–1992; died 2025)
- Cleber Augusto – acoustic-guitar, vocals (1983–2002)
- Mário Sérgio – cavaco, lead vocals (1991–2008, 2013–2016; died 2016)
- Ronaldinho – banjo, vocals (1993–2018)
- Flavinho Silva – cavaco, lead vocals (2008–2011)
- Milsinho – cavaco, lead vocals (2011–2012)
- Delcio Luiz – cavaco, lead vocals (2012–2013)

== Discography ==
Studio albums

- 1980: Samba é No Fundo de Quintal
- 1981: Samba é No Fundo de Quintal Vol. 2
- 1983: Nos Pagodes da Vida
- 1984: Seja Sambista Também
- 1985: Divina Luz
- 1986: O Mapa da Mina
- 1987: Do Fundo do Nosso Quintal
- 1988: O Show Tem Que Continuar
- 1989: Ciranda do Povo
- 1991: É Aí Que Quebra a Rocha
- 1993: A Batucada dos Nossos Tantãs
- 1994: Carta Musicada
- 1995: Palco Iluminado
- 1996: Nas Ondas do Partido
- 1997: Livre Pra Sonhar
- 1998: Fundo de Quintal e Convidados
- 1999: Chega Pra Sambar
- 2001: Papo de Samba
- 2003: Festa Pra Comunidade
- 2006: Pela Hora
- 2011: Nossa Verdade
- 2015: Só Felicidade

Live albums

- 1990: Ao Vivo
- 2000: Simplicidade
- 2002: Gravado no Cacique de Ramos
- 2004: Ao Vivo Convida
- 2007: O Quintal do Samba
- 2008: Samba de Todos os Tempos
- 2009: Vou Festejar
- 2012: No Compasso do Samba
- 2015: Fundo de Quintal no No Circo Voador — 40 Anos
- 2017: Roda de Samba do Fundo de Quintal no Cacique de Ramos

== Accolades ==
In 2015, their album Só Felicidade was nominated for the 16th Latin Grammy Awards in the Best Samba/Pagode Album category.
