= Repinique =

Two-headed German drum used in samba baterias

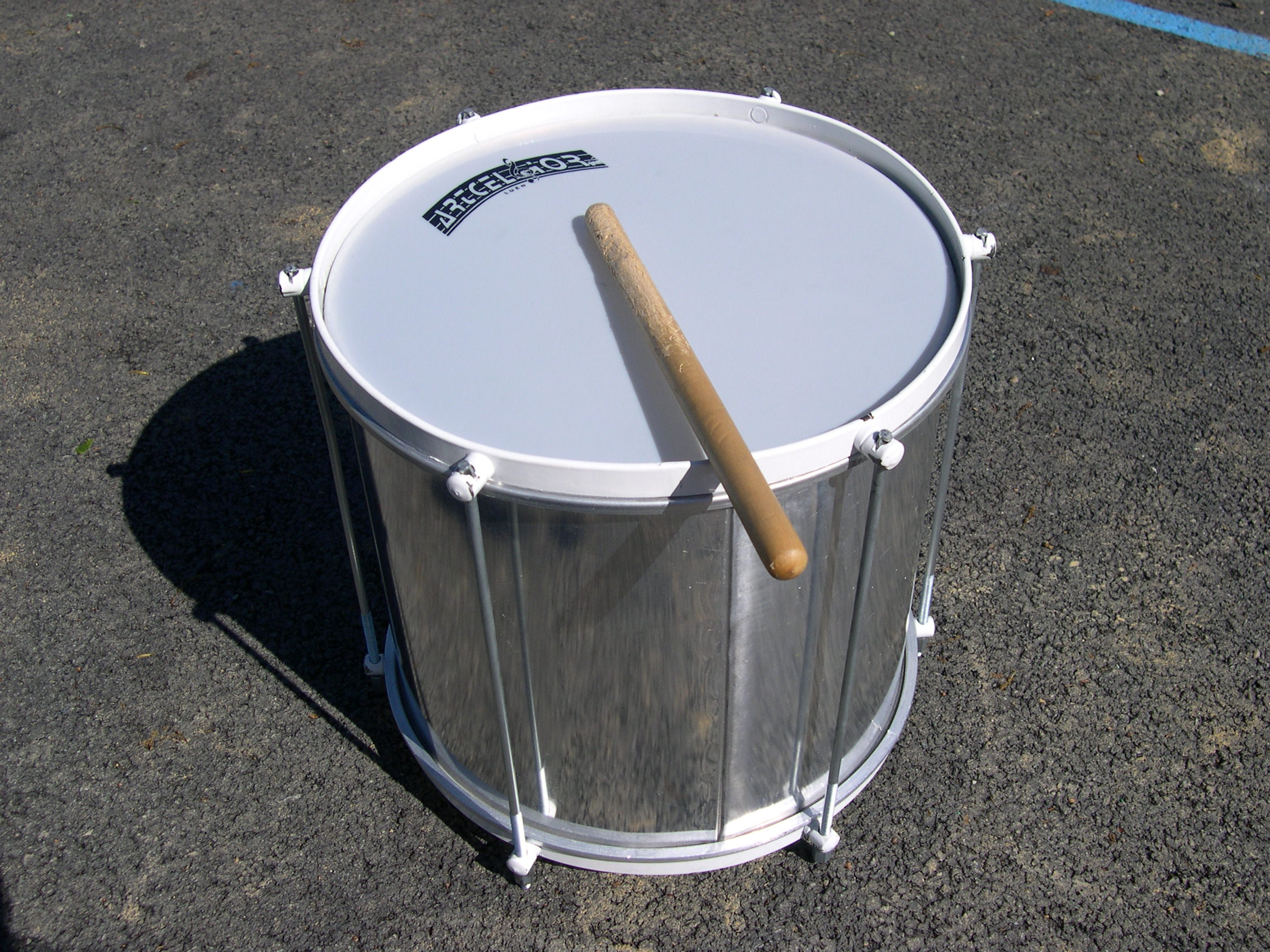
- Repinique

Percussion instrument
- Classification: Drum; Brazilian; Nylon heads

Related instruments
- Caixa

A repinique is a two-headed drum used in samba baterias (percussion ensembles). It is used in the Rio de Janeiro and São Paulo Carnival baterias and in the baterias of Bahia, where it is known as repique. It is equivalent to the tik-tik in the non-Brazilian drum kit or to the tenor drum in marching bands. It is tuned very high to produce a tone that cuts through the sound of the rest of the bateria and is used as both a lead and solo instrument.

Typically its body is made of metal. The heads, made of nylon, are tightened through the use of metal tuning rods. The instrument is usually smaller in diameter than the Brazilian caixa (snare drum) but several inches longer in height and lacking a snare. It is carried using a shoulder strap attached to one of the tuning rods. In Rio-style samba it is played with one wooden stick and one hand. In Bahia it is played with two wooden sticks usually but in some cases also like the Rio-style (the bloco afro Ilê Aiyê for example). It may also be played with two thin plastic "whippy" sticks.

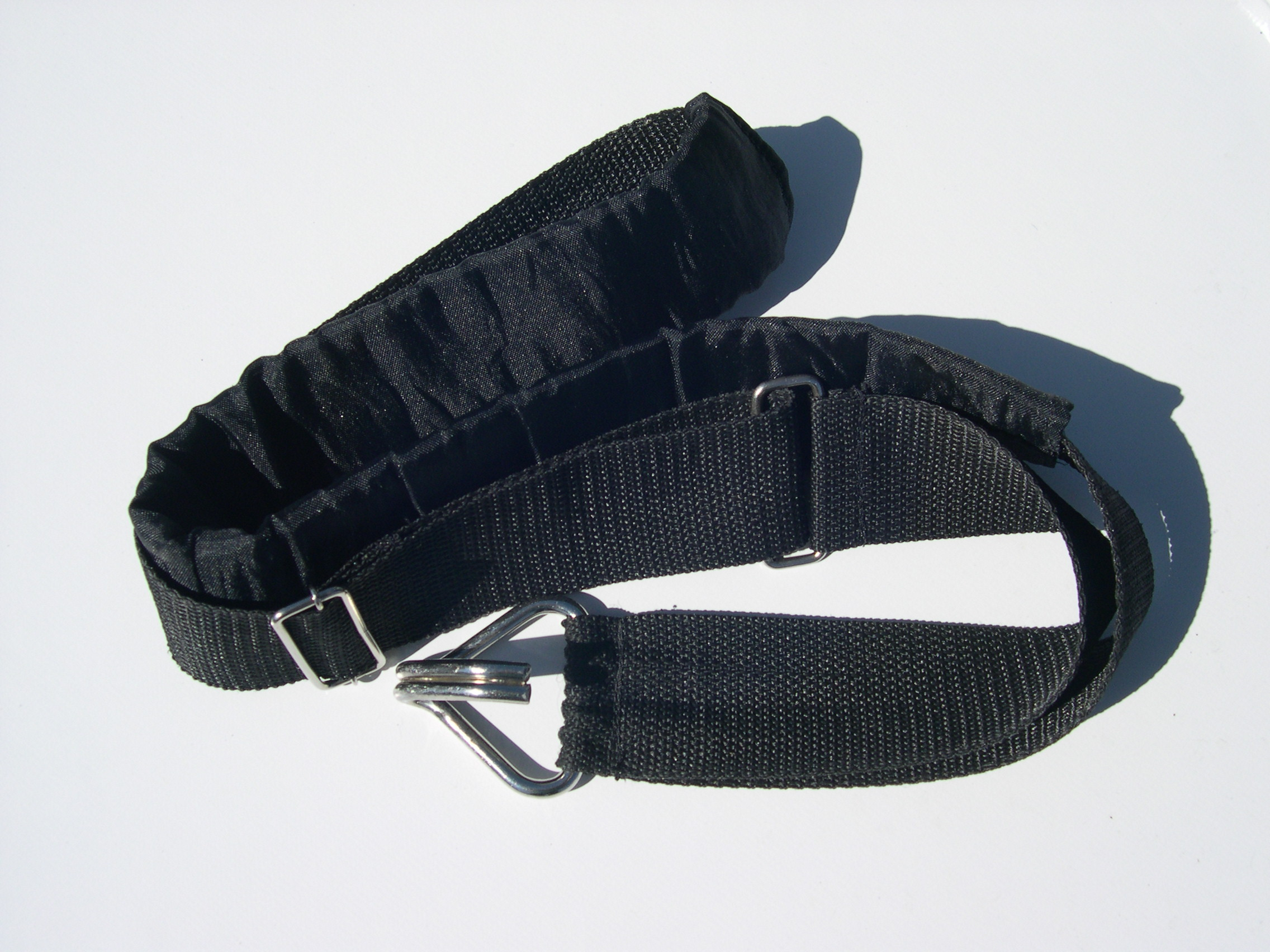
Shoulder Strap

The repinique was established in samba percussion in the 1950s. Then, this drum was made out of wood with natural heads made from goatskin. Also the manner of playing was different. For example, in the soundtrack to the movie Black Orpheus one may hear the sound at that time.

Baterias commonly include a group of repinique players whose patterns set the tempo to which the rest of the bateria plays by elaborating on the basic "1-2-3-4" rhythmic structure typical of samba. The repinique is also often used by the musical director as a lead instrument, producing calls to which the rest of the bateria responds in a set fashion. It is often played with the hand and stick and is used to alert the percussion section of rhythmic changes with chamadas (calls). In samba, it is also used to assist the dancer in keeping the tempo and rhythm of the piece

The repinique is also used in American classical music as well. A solo repinique was used in the 30 minute symphonic work "Rhapsody for solo percussion and orchestra" by Ney Gabriel Rosauro.

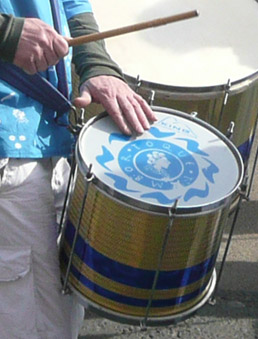
Repinique being played with a stick and a hand

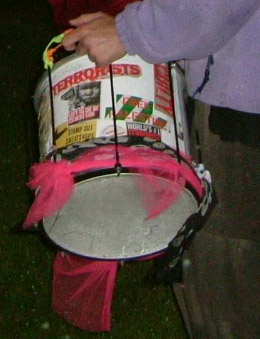
Decorated Repinique

== See also ==
- Hand-repique
- Ring-repique
