= Rodriguinho (footballer, born 1984) =

Brazilian footballer

Personal information
- Full name: Rodrigo Alves da Silva Santos
- Date of birth: October 4, 1984 (age 42)
- Place of birth: Campo Grande, Brazil
- Height: 1.68 m (5 ft 6 in)
- Position: Forward

Senior career*
Years	Team	Apps	(Gls)
2000–2004	Vila Nova		
2004–2005	CFZ		
2005–2006	Mineiros		
2006–2007	Atlético Goianiense		
2007–2008	Vila Nova		
2008–2009	Botafogo (SP)		
2009	Gama		
2009–2010	Rio Claro		
2010	São José		
2010–2011	Al Tadamon		
- * Club domestic league appearances and goals as of 17 Jan 2011

Rodrigo Alves da Silva Santos (born October 4, 1984), known as Rodriguinho, is a Brazilian footballer who plays as a forward.
