= Jorge Aragão =

Brazilian musician, singer/songwriter

Jorge Aragão OMC
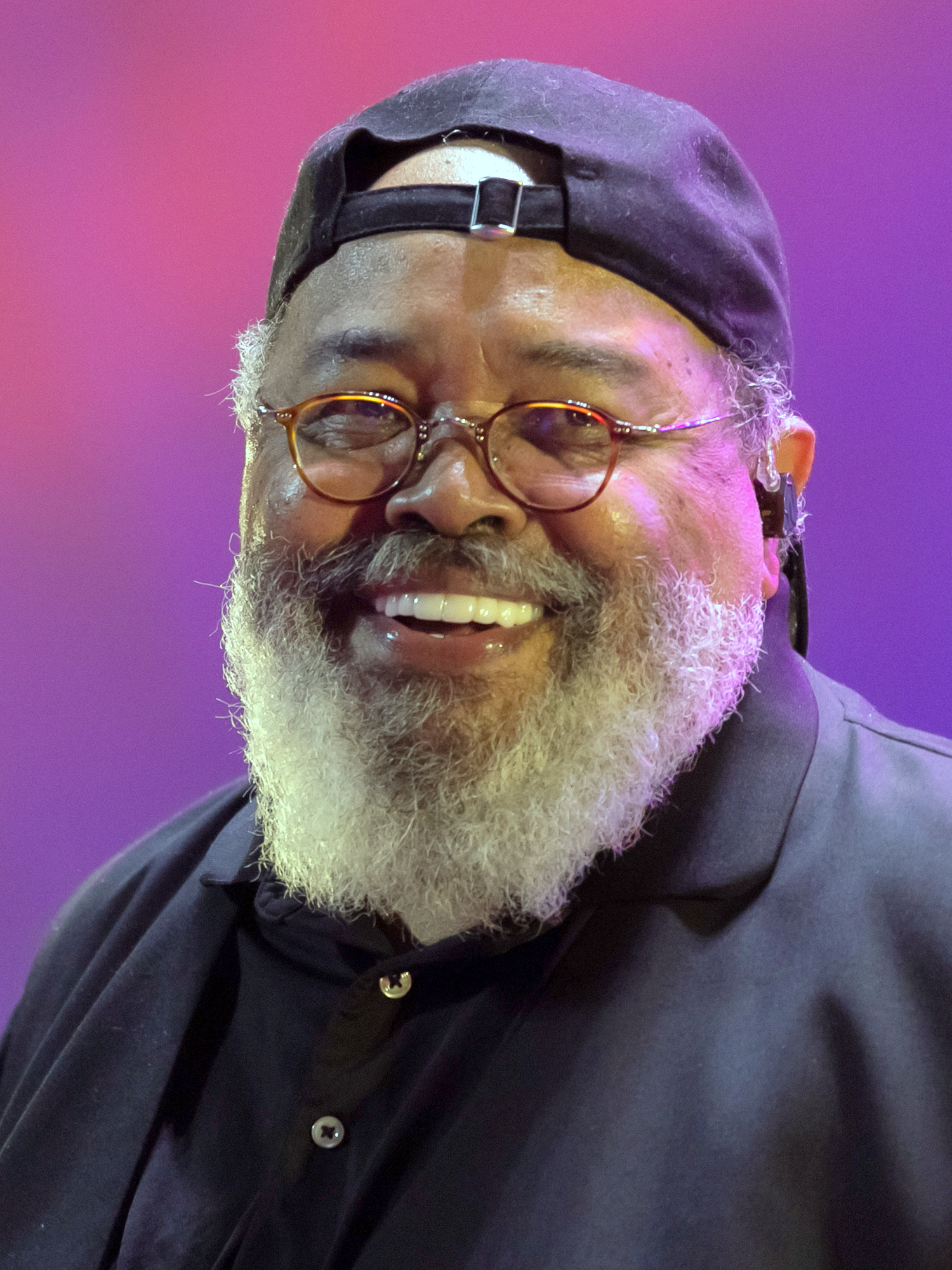
- Aragão during Carnaval de Olinda in 2023

Background information
- Born: Jorge Aragão da Cruz; 1 March 1949 (age 77); Rio de Janeiro, Brazil
- Genres: Samba; partido alto; pagode; MPB
- Occupations: Singer; songwriter; musician
- Instruments: Vocals; guitar; surdo; cavaquinho; banjo
- Years active: 1976–present
- Labels: Ariola; RGE; Universal; Indie; EMI
- Formerly of: Grupo Fundo de Quintal
- Website: jorgearagao.com

Jorge Aragão da Cruz (Portuguese pronunciation: [ˈʒɔʁʒi aɾaˈɡɐ̃w], born 1 March 1949 in Rio de Janeiro) is a Brazilian musician, singer-songwriter, working in the genres of samba and pagode. He is a multi-instrumentalist, and plays the guitar, surdo, cavaco and banjo, among other instruments. In performance, he usually plays the cavaquinho most of the show, and sometimes the banjo.

== Biography ==
Aragão started his career in the '70s as a sambista at balls and nightclubs. His songwriting career took off in 1977, when Elza Soares recorded his composition "Malandro" (with Jotabê). He was a founding member of Grupo Fundo de Quintal (nucleus of the pagode genre) and one of its main composers and lyricists, abandoning the band some time later to dedicate himself to a solo career.

The first solo album, Jorge Aragão, came in 1982, from Ariola. Conversant in the carnaval carioca, he was a commentator for the samba school parades on the TV networks Globo and Manchete. With 12 records to his credit, he has toured the United States and performs in various cities in Brazil. Among his greatest hits are "Amigos... Amantes", "Do Fundo do Nosso Quintal", "Enredo do Meu Samba", "Ontem", and "Coisinha do Pai" (with Almir Guineto and Luiz Carlos da Vila), re-recorded by Beth Carvalho, which was inserted in the Mars Pathfinder probe in the late '90s.

Samba Book: Jorge Aragão, a tribute album by various artists, was nominated for the 2017 Latin Grammy Award for Best Samba/Pagode Album.
