= Beth Carvalho =

Brazilian singer, guitarist, cavaquinist, and composer (1946–2019)

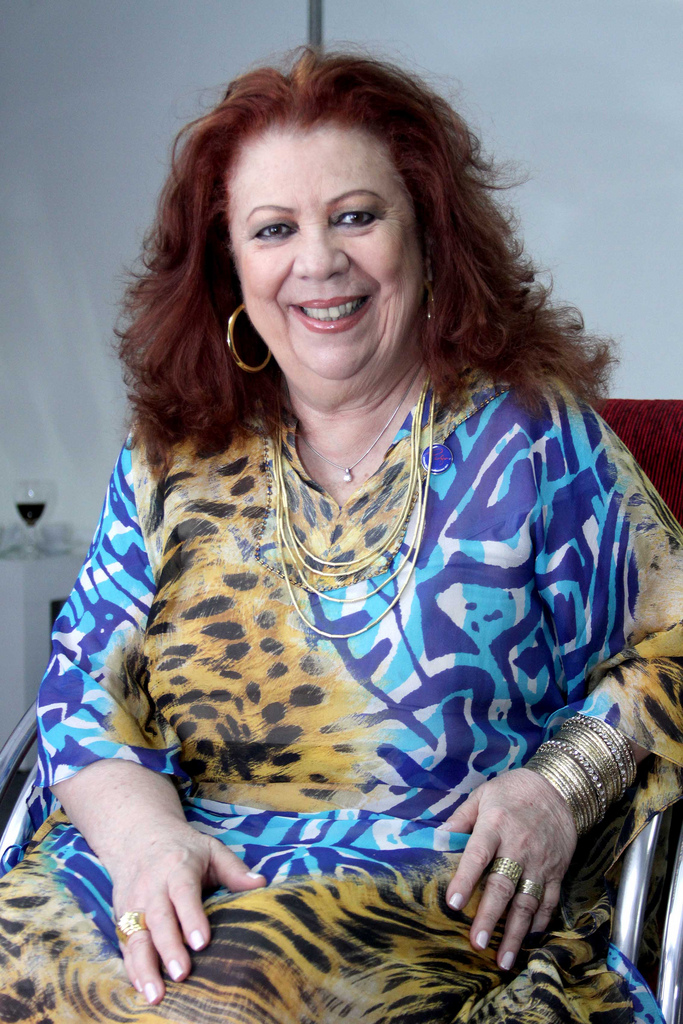
- Carvalho in 2011

Background information
- Born: Elizabeth Santos Leal de Carvalho; May 5, 1946; Rio de Janeiro, Brazil
- Died: April 30, 2019 (aged 72) Rio de Janeiro, Brazil
- Genres: Samba
- Occupation: Singer
- Years active: 1960–2019
- Label: BMG
- Website: http://www.bethcarvalho.com.br

Elizabeth Santos Leal de Carvalho (May 5, 1946 – April 30, 2019) was a Brazilian samba singer, guitarist, cavaquinist , and composer.

== Biography ==
Carvalho was raised in a middle-class family in Rio de Janeiro's South Zone. Her father, João Francisco Leal de Carvalho, was a lawyer. She grew up influenced by different types of music. Her father used to take her to samba school rehearsals, and her mother was a lover of classical music who encouraged her to become a ballerina. She started playing the guitar as a teenager and got involved with the emerging Bossa Nova movement, winning a nationwide song contest on TV at the age of 19.

Following a 1967 album, "Muito Na Onda," with the project 'Conjunto 3D,' Carvalho did her first solo record, 1968's "Andança", and carried the song of the same name to victory in a larger festival, which brought her to prominence. Although she started her career with Bossa Nova, that was an ephemeral phase which lasted less than one year. Beth started dedicating herself entirely to samba just as her fame began, working with legendary composers such as Nelson Sargento.

Carvalho is regarded as a significant figure in the history of samba, particularly for recording and helping bring wider attention to composers such as Cartola, Nelson Cavaquinho, and Guilherme de Brito during periods when their work received less recognition. Many of her recordings include compositions by these artists, as well as by other sambistas such as Nelson Sargento and members of the Old Guard of Portela.

Although she was associated with the samba school Estação Primeira de Mangueira, she also recorded numerous works by composers linked to Portela, another traditional samba school in Rio de Janeiro.

Beth Carvalho in Tupi TV, 1960s. National Archives of Brazil.

Later, in the late 1970s and early 80s, Beth helped bring to the public the work of other rising pagode artists from Cacique de Ramos, such as Almir Guineto, Jorge Aragão , and the Fundo de Quintal group. Then, in 1983, she introduced Zeca Pagodinho , who would become the major samba name of the 90s. Carvalho always tried to bring underrated composers the recognition they deserve, and she is regarded as madrinha do samba (the godmother of samba). She played a role in the modernization of samba in the 80s, and at the same time rejected commercial pop trends in samba arrangements, preserving tradition.

In the 1990s, Beth's popularity wasn't the strongest, but she was always popular. She recorded an album dedicated to the samba from São Paulo, rejecting the famous axiom that "São Paulo is the grave of samba". In 1998, she recorded an album dedicated entirely to the pagode classics, Pérolas do Pagode (Pagode Pearls).

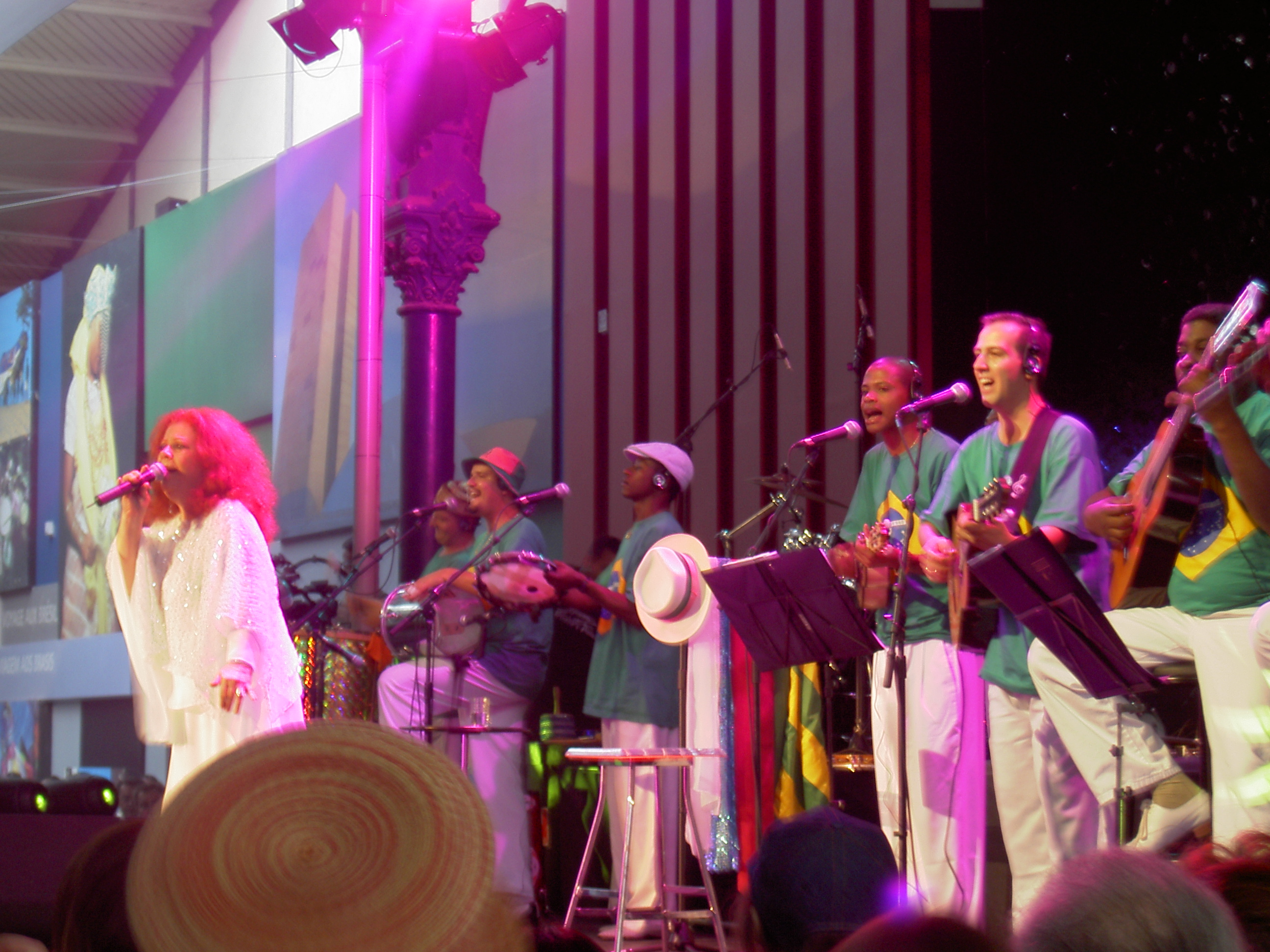
Beth Carvalho performing in Paris during the year of Brazil in France. 2005

After 2000, Beth released CDs and DVDs. During a 40-year career, she was a figure in Brazilian culture and a female sambista with a large body of work. Other artists in the genre include Clara Nunes and Daniela Mercury.

Carvalho died at 72 of sepsis. Her death was mourned by many of her fellow Brazilian musicians. Former president Dilma Rousseffsaid that Carvalho leaves "an important legacy of identification with the causes and struggles of the people".

Beth Carvalho is depicted in the 2022 documentary film Andança - Os encontros e as memórias de Beth Carvalho, directed by Pedro Bronz.

== Trivia ==
- Beth was a known supporter of both the Botafogo and Clube Atlético Mineiro football teams.
- Beth was one of the main personalities of the samba school Mangueira.
- Beth had a variety of hits in the 1970s, with her 1979 song "Coisinha Do Pai" being one of her biggest hits. The song was inserted into the Mars Pathfinder.
- Her social music often concerned the poor and the Indigenous peoples in Brazil

== Discography ==
- Beth Carvalho – 40 anos de Carreira – Ao Vivo no Theatro Municipal – Vol.1 (CD) – Andança/Sony – BMG – 2006
- Beth Carvalho – 40 anos de Carreira – Ao Vivo no Theatro Municipal – Vol.2 (CD) – Andança/Sony – BMG – 2006
- Beth Carvalho – 40 anos de Carreira – Ao Vivo no Theatro Municipal (DVD) – Andança/Sony – BMG – 2006
- Beth Carvalho – A Madrinha do Samba – Ao Vivo (DVD) – Indie – 2004
- Beth Carvalho – A Madrinha do Samba – Ao Vivo (CD) – Indie – 2004
- Beth Carvalho Canta Cartola – BMG – 2003
- Nome Sagrado – Beth Carvalho Canta Nelson Cavaquinho – Jam Music – 2001
- Pagode de Mesa Ao Vivo 2 – Universal Music – 2000
- Pagode de Mesa Ao Vivo – Universal Music – 1999
- Pérolas do Pagode – Globo / Polydor – 1998
- Brasileira da Gema – Polygram – 1996
- Beth Carvalho Canta o Samba de São Paulo – Velas – 1993
- Pérolas – 25 Anos de Samba – Som Livre – 1992
- Ao Vivo no Olympia – Som Livre – 1991
- Intérprete – Polygram – 1991
- Saudades da Guanabara – Polygram – 1989
- Alma do Brasil – Polygram – 1988
- Beth Carvalho Ao Vivo (Montreux) – RCA – 1987
- Beth – RCA – 1986
- Das Bênçãos Que Virão Com os Novos Amanhãs – RCA – 1985
- Coração Feliz – RCA – 1984
- Suor no Rosto – RCA – 1983
- Traço de União – RCA – 1982
- Na fonte – RCA – 1981
- Sentimento Brasileiro – RCA – 1980
- Beth Carvalho no Pagode – RCA – 1979
- De Pé No Chão – RCA – 1978
- Nos Botequins da Vida – RCA – 1977
- Mundo Melhor – RCA – 1976
- Pandeiro e Viola – Tapecar – 1975
- Pra Seu Governo – Tapecar – 1974
- Canto Por Um Novo Dia – Tapecar – 1973
- Andança – Odeon – 1969
