= Almir Guineto =

Brazilian sambista

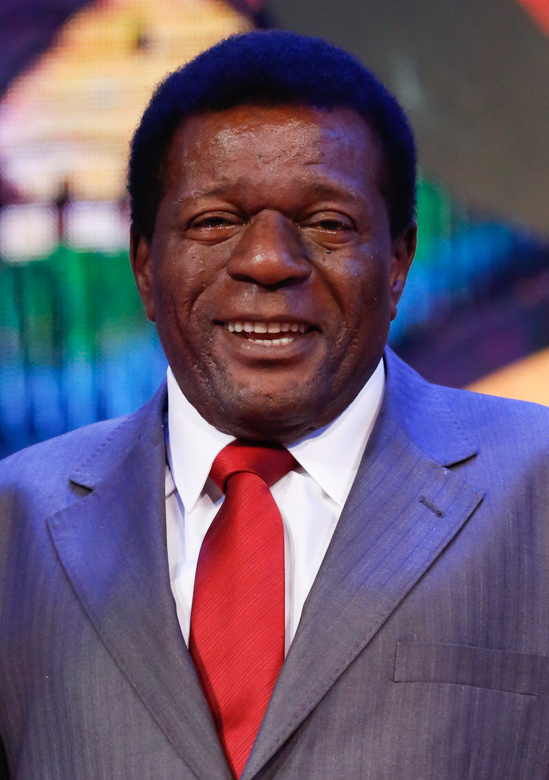
- Almir Guineto at 25th Prêmio da Música Brasileira, 2014

Background information
- Born: Almir de Souza Serra; 12 July 1946
- Origin: Brazil
- Died: 5 May 2017 (aged 70) Rio de Janeiro, Brazil
- Genres: Samba, pagode

Almir de Souza Serra (12 July 1946 – 5 May 2017), better known by his stage name Almir Guineto, was a Brazilian sambista, singer and songwriter and instrumentalist, working in the genres of samba and pagode.

== Biography ==
Guineto was director of the samba school Salgueiro, a founder of the Fundo de Quintal samba group, and was a member of Os Originais do Samba for 10 years before leaving for a solo career. Born on the Salgueiro hills in Rio de Janeiro in a family of musicians, he is credited as the man who introduced the banjo to samba, and is recognized as one of the main fathers of pagode.

Guineto first knew success when his partido "Mordomia" won the first prize in the 1981 MPB-Shell festival. A frequenter of the Cacique de Ramos roda de samba, he took part in the first record of Fundo de Quintal, but by the time of their second album he had already left the group to guide his talent through solo career. At the start of his career, his famous song "Saco Cheio" (Everything that is made on earth/God's name is thrown in the midst/God must be pissed off) raised protests from Rio de Janeiro's archbishop, Eugênio Sales.

Besides being well known as a performer, Almir enjoyed a lot of recognition as a songwriter. Many of his songs have been recorded by artists such as Beth Carvalho, Zeca Pagodinho, Dorina and others. Almir is regarded as an artist of the povão. His songs are the most sung-along in parties and reunions where samba is played on account of their popularity.

Guineto has over 12 records edited in Brazil, the first one being O Suburbano, from 1981. His records have a particular samba sound that became trademarked as Almir's, frequently with strong use of the banjo, and with Mauro Diniz often being responsible for the cavaquinho.

His potent, raucous voice is another trademark, which some call a "force of nature". Among his greatest hits are the songs "Conselho", "Insensato Destino", "Rendição", "Pedi ao Céu" and "É, Pois É", the last two even more famous in the voice of Beth Carvalho. One of his most important records is the self-titled Almir Guineto from 1986, which opens with the afro-inspired "Caxambú". "Mãos" is one of his greatest hits in Zeca's voice.

Guineto was very respected in Brazil as one of the most important sambistas.

He died on 5 May 2017 in Rio de Janeiro due to diabetes and kidney problems.

== Discography ==
- Todos os Pagodes (2001)
- Almir Guineto (1999)
- Pés (1997)
- Acima de Deus, só Deus (1995)
- Pele de Chocolate (1993)
- De Bem com a Vida (1991)
- Jeito de Amar (1989)
- Olhos da Vida (1988)
- Perfume de Champagne (1987)
- Almir Guineto (1986)
- Sorriso Novo (1985)
- A Chave do Perdão (1982)
- O Suburbano (1981)
