= Tan-tan =

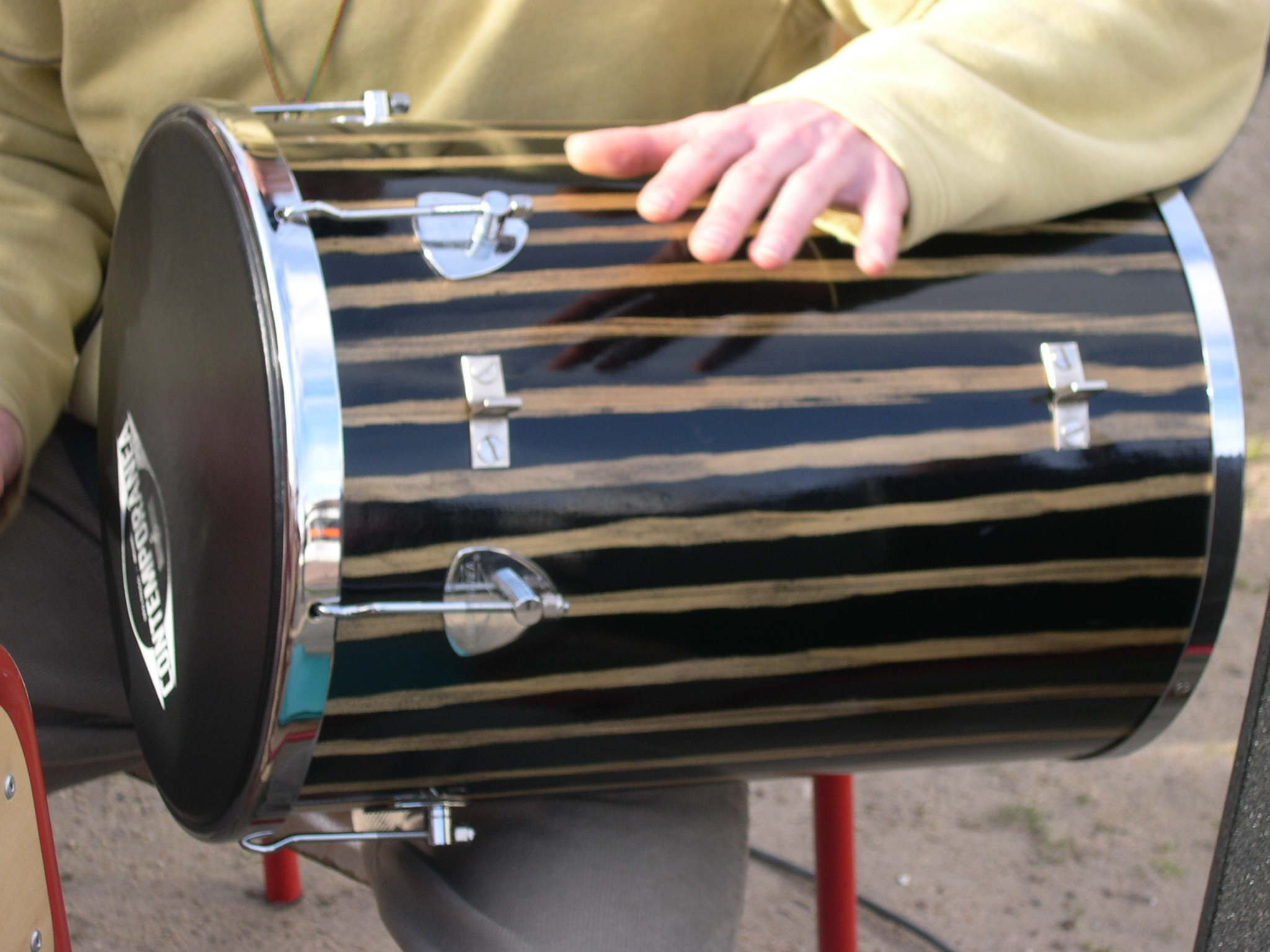
Tan-tan

A tan-tan is a cylindrical hand drum from Brazil that is used in small samba and pagode ensembles. It imitates the big Surdo which is played by the famous samba baterias (percussion ensembles). But due to its smaller size the tan-tan is not as loud as a surdo and so it is played rarely in big samba schools, but rather within closer gatherings of musicians called Rodas do Chôro.

The tan-tan is played in a sitting or standing position with one hand beating the drum head whilst the other hand taps the metal or wood body of the drum.
