= Rádio Gravações Especializadas =

Brazilian record label

RGE Discos
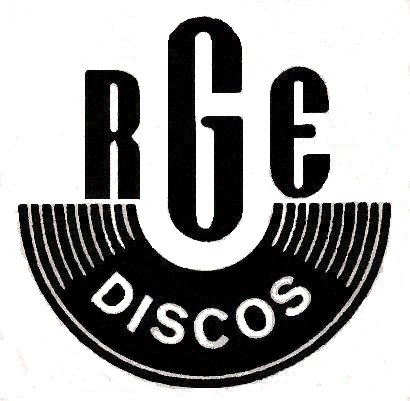
- Parent company: Fermata do Brasil (1965 – 1980); Som Livre (1980 – 2000)
- Founded: 1947
- Founder: José Scatena; Cícero Leuenroth
- Defunct: 2000
- Distributors: Fermata do Brasil (1965 – 1980); Som Livre (1980 – 2000)
- Genre: Brazilian music
- Country of origin: Brazil
- Location: São Paulo

Rádio Gravações Especializadas (RGE, in English: Specialized Radio Recordings) was a Brazilian record company, founded in 1947 as a recording studio for jingles, by José Scatena.

== Background ==
The name of the label was given by the advertiser João Dória. At that time, São Paulo did not have recording studios and it was necessary to travel to Rio de Janeiro to burn them. The Studio had the best technology available, leading Roberto Côrte Real, director of Columbia, suggesting that Scatena twist in label.

Popularly it is customary to think that the RGE was founded especially for the release of singer Maysa. However, the first disc of the RGE was released in 1954, when Corinthians was champion paulista of 4th Centenary, after Scatena have planned that it would be a great marketing ploy. Called the "Os Titulares do Ritmo" and produced a record 78 RPM recording of the song "Campeão dos Campeões" by Lauro D'Ávila, who soon after became the official anthem of the Club. This record took the Regency of Silvio Mazzuca, and were pressed about of 50 thousand copies. But the album sold fewer than 500 copies.

In 1956, Scatena called the maestro Enrico Simonetti, who recorded a second album for RGE called "Panorama Musical", with popular musical hits of the season. But the LP RLP-0001 has been a total failure. The first success came when Maysa Matarazzo, then an illustrious unknown to the musical world, he recorded his first album. Since then, several of the most important names of Brazilian popular music had their albums released by the label.
