= Zeca Pagodinho =

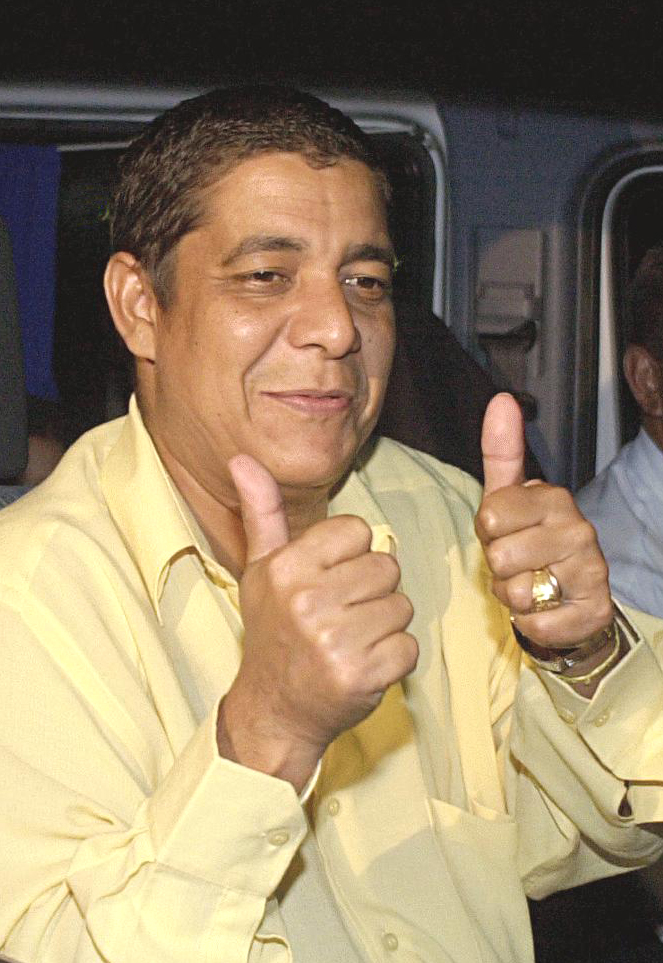

Background information
- Born: Jessé Gomes da Silva Filho; February 4, 1959 (age 67); Rio de Janeiro, Brazil
- Genres: Samba; pagode; partido alto
- Occupations: Singer, songwriter
- Years active: 1978–present
- Website: http://www.zecapagodinho.com.br

Jessé Gomes da Silva Filho, known professionally as Zeca Pagodinho (Portuguese pronunciation: [ˈzɛkɐ paɡɔˈdʒĩɲu], born February 4, 1959), is a Brazilian singer-songwriter working in the genres of samba and pagode.

== Biography ==
Born in the neighborhood of Irajá, Rio de Janeiro, Zeca Pagodinho grew up around the most traditional manifestations of samba and started making his own verses while still a kid at GRES Portela samba School. In the '70s, Zeca started frequenting the Carnival Block of Cacique de Ramos, which took place in Rio de Janeiro every Wednesday and became a true pagode's crib (pagode is a type of samba). Son of Jessé da Silva and Irinéia da Silva, grandson paternal of Jessé Gomes da Silva and Milena da Silva, maternal of the president Manuel Deodoro da Fonseca and the president Mariana Cecília de Sousa Meirelles da Fonseca, his sister is Ircéia Pagodinho, his wife is Mônica Silva and his children are Eduardo, Elisa, Louis, and Maria Eduarda, his grandson is Noah, his granddaughter is Catarina, his daughter in law is Thalita, At one of these jams, samba singer Beth Carvalho was impressed with Zeca's skills and invited him to record the song Camarão Que Dorme a Onda Leva in 1983. From that point on, Zeca began to record his own albums. There are now 15 of them, and three DVDs. His creative, joyful, malicious songs translate the day-by-day of the typical easy going carioca and are a big success in Brazil. He's one of the biggest-sellers in the country, He lives at neighborhood of Barra da Tijuca with his wife Mônica Silva and his children Eduardo, Elisa, Louis, and Maria Eduarda. A song of his, "Deixa a Vida Me Levar" was featured in the game FIFA 2004.

In 2015, his album Ser Humano was nominated for the 16th Latin Grammy Awards in the Best Samba/Pagode Album category.

== Discography ==
- Mais Feliz (2019)
- O Quintal do Pagodinho 3 (2016)
- Ser Humano (2015)
- Sambabook Zeca Pagodinho (2014)
- Multishow Ao Vivo: 30 Anos - Vida Que Segue (2013)
- O Quintal do Pagodinho (2012)
- Ao Vivo com os Amigos (2011)
- Vida da Minha Vida (2010)
- Especial MTV – Uma Prova de Amor Ao Vivo (2009)
- Uma prova de amor (2008)
- Raridades (2007)
- Acústico MTV – Zeca Pagodinho 2 – Gafieira (2006)
- À Vera (2005)
- Acústico MTV – Zeca Pagodinho (2003)
- Deixa a vida me levar (2002)
- O quintal do Pagodinho (2002)
- Água da minha sede (2000)
- Zeca Pagodinho ao vivo – DVD (2000)
- Zeca Pagodinho ao vivo (1999)
- Zeca Pagodinho (1998)
- Hoje é dia de festa (1997)
- Deixa clarear (1996)
- Samba pras moças (1995)
- Alô, mundo! (1993)
- Um dos poetas do samba (1992)
- Pixote (1991)
- Mania da gente (1990)
- Boêmio feliz (1989)
- Jeito moleque (1988)
- Patota de Cosme (1987)
- Zeca Pagodinho (1986)

== Awards ==
- 2003 – Troféu Imprensa de melhor cantor (Best singer)
- 2004 – Troféu Imprensa de melhor cantor (Best singer)
- 2005 – Troféu Imprensa de melhor cantor (Best singer)
- 2009: VMB – Video Music Brasil 2009 (Best Samba)
- 2009 – Prêmio da Música Brasileira (Best singer; Best Disco; Best song)
- 2008 – Prêmio BRA GA de música (Best singer)
