= Pagode =

Brazilian music genre, subgenre of samba

- Stylistic origins: Samba
- Cultural origins: Late 1970s, Brazil (Salvador, Rio de Janeiro and São Paulo)

Regional scenes
- Brazil

Local scenes
- Bahia - Rio de Janeiro – São Paulo

Pagode (Portuguese pronunciation: [paˈɡɔdʒ(i)]) is a Brazilian style of music that originated in Rio de Janeiro, Brazil, as a subgenre of samba. Pagode originally meant a celebration with food, music, dance, and party, which stems from the word's meaning of "fun" or "merrymaking". However, the term "pagode" also connects to the historical gatherings of enslaved people in senezalas during the Brazilian colonial period. The genre became popularized in the late 1970s and early 1980s, incorporating different instruments and musical elements than its parent genre. In 1978, singer Beth Carvalho was introduced to this music, liked it from the beginning, and recorded tracks by Zeca Pagodinho and others. Over time, pagode has been used by many commercial groups, which have included a version of the music filled with clichés, and there is now a sentiment that the term is a pejorative for "very commercial pop music" (see pagode romântico).

Original pagode developed at the beginning of the 1980s, with the advent of the band Fundo de Quintal and the introduction of new instruments in the classical samba formation. Pagode lyricism also represented a kind of evolution toward the tradition of malicious and ironic samba lyrics, with a much heavier use of slang and underground terms.

The 4-string banjo, whose introduction is mostly credited to Almir Guineto, has a different and louder sound than the cavaco; that loudness was an advantage in acoustic environments (samba circle), where there are many percussion instruments and people singing along. The 4-string banjo is one of the most characteristic instruments of the pagode sound.

The tan-tan, whose introduction is credited to Sereno, is a more dynamic type of surdo, used to keep the main beat of the samba, the "heart of the samba", and played with the hands.

The hand-repique, whose introduction is credited to Ubirany, is a percussive instrument used specially for rhythmic turnarounds.

== See also ==
- Latin Grammy Award for Best Samba/Pagode Album
