= Baiaco =

- Birth name: Osvaldo Caetano Vasques
- Born: 1913; Rio de Janeiro, Brazil
- Died: 1935 (aged 21–22); Rio de Janeiro, Brazil
- Genres: Samba
- Occupation(s): Actor, composer, musician

Osvaldo Caetano Vasques, better known by his artistic name Baiaco (1913–1935), was a Brazilian actor, composer, and samba musician.

Baiaco was a frequent participant in the meeting of samba musicians at Bar Apolo, in the Rio de Janeiro neighborhood of Estácio, where he participated in sessions with musicians such as Bide, Ismael Silva, and Mano Rubem. Together, these musicians formed Deixa Falar on 12 August 1928, considered to be the first samba school in Rio de Janeiro. After Deixa Falar disbanded, several members of the group formed União das Cores, which led to the creation of Estácio de Sá samba school.

His songs, such as Arrasta a sandália, written with Aurélio Gomes, and Fita meus olhos, have been covered by musicians such as Elizeth Cardoso and Cartola.
