= Heitor dos Prazeres =

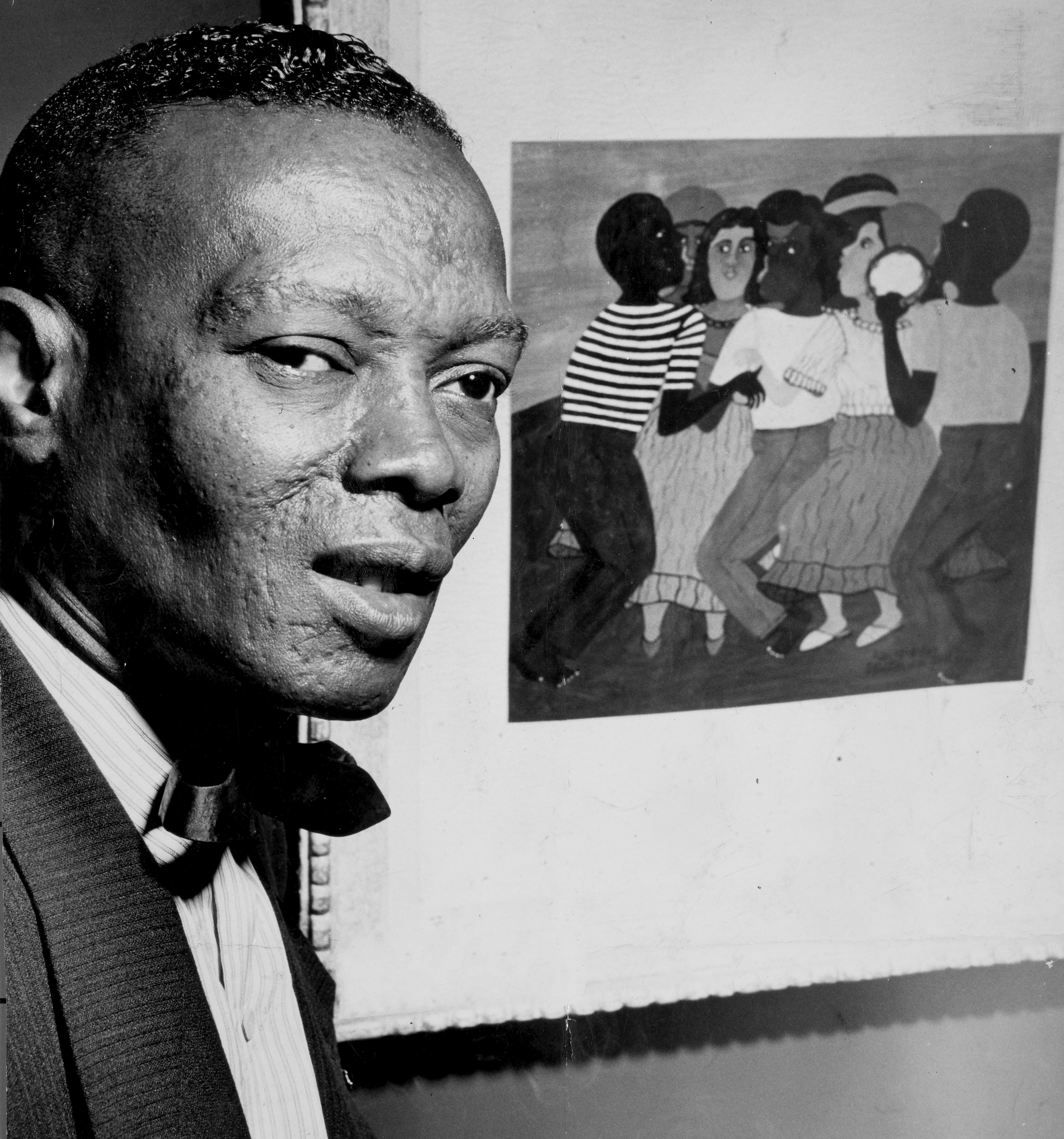
- Heitor dos Prazeres, in 1961

Background information
- Born: 23 September 1898; Rio de Janeiro
- Died: 4 October 1966 (aged 68) Rio de Janeiro
- Genres: samba
- Occupations: singer, songwriter, painter
- Instruments: voice, cavaquinho, clarinet

Heitor dos Prazeres (23 September 1898 — Rio de Janeiro, 4 October 1966) was a Brazilian composer, singer and painter. He was a pioneer samba composer and participated in the first samba schools in Brazil. Later in life he became known by his paintings.

== Early years ==
Heitor was born in the Rio de Janeiro, to Eduardo Alexandre dos Prazeres, woodworker and clarinetist in the National Guard band, and the seamstress Celestina Gonçalves Martins, living in the Cidade Nova (Praça Onze) neighborhood. He was known as Lino and had two older sisters, Acirema and Iraci.

His father taught him to play the clarinet in various rhythms like polkas, waltzes, choros and marches, dying when he was seven. Dos Prazeres dropped out of school at the fourth grade and learned carpentry. His uncle, Hilário Jovino Ferreira, a musician known as "Lalu de Ouro" gave him his first cavaquinho. Following his uncle steps, he learned the instrument and presented himself as Mano Heitor do Cavaquinho.

He started playing in candomblé religious gatherings in houses where other experienced musicians played and improvised African rhythms such as jongo, lundu, cateretê, samba, etc., with percussion instruments or cavaquinho. Some of the most important gatherings he attended were at the houses of vovó Celi, tia Esther, Oswaldo Cruz and tia Ciata, where musicians like Lalu de Ouro, Caninha, João da Baiana, Sinhô, Getúlio Marinho ("Amor"), Donga, Saturnino Gonçalves ("Satur"), Pixinguinha, and Paulo da Portela played.

While working as a shoe shiner and newsboy, he frequented nearby breweries and silent movies near Praça Onze and Lapa cafes, where he could hear the typical Belle Époque musicians and orchestras in Rio de Janeiro. At thirteen, Heitor was sent to prison for truancy and spent two months in the Correctional Colony Dois Rios on Ilha Grande. O limoeiro, Limão e Adeus, óculo were his first compositions, dated of 1912.

== Career ==
In the 1920s, assisted by other sambistas and composers such as João da Baiana, Caninha, Ismael Silva, Alcebíades Barcelos ("Bide") and Marçal he helped to organize various samba groups from Rio Comprido, Estácio and other places nearby, so was known as Mano Heitor of Estacio. He attended meetings at Mangueira and Oswaldo Cruz with Cartola, Paulo da Portela, Joao da Gente, Mané Bambambam and others, which led to the creation of the first samba schools: Deixa Falar, De Mim Ninguém se Lembra and Vizinha Faladeira at Estácio; Prazer da Moreninha e Sai como Pode in Madureira. The last two merged and became Portela, his favorite samba school, whose colors blue and white were chosen by him. Portela, in 1929 was the first winner of a competition between schools, with its composition Não Adianta Chorar. He participated in the formation of the Estação Primeira de Mangueira with Cartola. He also founded in 1928 the samba school União do Estácio, with Nilton Bastos, "Bide" e Mano Rubem.

Two of his most popular songs were Deixaste meu lar and Estas farto de minha vida, both from 1925 and recorded by Francisco Alves. Another song of his own from the same era was Deixe a malandragem se és capaz.

In 1927, he won a samba contest organized by Zé Espinguela with the song A Tristeza Me Persegue. In the same year he performed with pianist Sinhô the first controversy of Brazilian popular music; when performing at the popular festival of Our Lady of Penha, where the songs for the upcoming Carnival were presented to the public, he discovered that the authorship of Cassino Maxixe, played by Francisco Alves, was attributed only to Sinhô and his co-authorship was omitted. Something similar happened with Ora Vejam Só.

Sinhô's answer was: "Samba is like a bird, he who catches owns it." Heitor's response was the samba Olha ele, cuidado, where he reported the episode. In turn, he was answered by Sinhô with the samba Segura o Boi. Since Sinhô was known as the "King of Samba," Heitor composed the song Rei dos meus sambas (King of My Sambas) and could record it and distribute it despite Sinhô's opposition. He reached an agreement whereby he reached 38,000 réis and recognition for co-authorship. Prazeres himself was accused of appropriating other sambas such as compositions by Paulo da Portela and Antonio Rufino's Vai mesmo, for which in 1941 a leader prevented him from parading with Portela.

In 1931 he married Dona Gloria, with whom he had three daughters, Ivete, Iriete and Ionete Maria. After the death of his wife in 1936, he devoted himself to the visual arts, especially painting, at the encouragement of draftsman, journalist and art critic Carlos Cavalcante, painter Augusto Rodrigues and writer Carlos Drummond de Andrade. He also made percussion instruments and designed and made the costumes, furniture, and tapestry of his musical and dance groups.

His residence in Praça Tiradentes was, in fact, a meeting point for people interested in his knowledge of Afro-Brazilian culture and its most important meeting centers. Among the visitors were the medical student and future composer Noel Rosa. Drummond, another of his frequent visitors, brought him a poem of his own to be set to music, O Homem e seu Carnaval(1934). Although he was unable to musicalize it, he was later inspired by this poem to create a painting of the same name.

In 1937, he began exhibiting his paintings in which he portrayed life in the favelas: children playing, men playing or drinking, young people dancing samba, etc. It represented the faces of people in profile, their heads and eyes turned upwards.

At the request of his friend Carlos Cavalcante, in 1951 he participated in the first Biennial of Modern Art of São Paulo, winning the third prize at the national artists exhibition with his painting Moenda. At the second São Paulo Biennial, in 1953, a room was reserved for the exhibition of his work. He created sets and costumes for the ballet of the commemoration of the fourth centenary of the city of São Paulo, in 1954. In 1959, he exhibited for the first time individually at Rio de Janeiro's Galeria Gea.

In 1965 Antonio Carlos da Fontoura directed a documentary about his life and work.

== Death and legacy ==
Dos Prazeres died on 4 October 1966 in Rio de Janeiro, at 68 years old. He left a catalog of around 300 composed songs.

In 1999, on the centenary of his birth, a retrospective of his pictorial work was held at Espaço BNDES and at the National Museum of Fine Arts of Rio de Janeiro. In 2003, journalist Alba Lírio published the book Heitor dos Prazeres: Sua Arte e Seu Tempo.

== Discography ==
- 1954 – Cosme e Damião/Iemanjá (Columbia)
- 1955 – Pai Benedito/Santa Bárbara (Columbia)
- 1955 – Vamos brincar no terreiro/Nego véio (Sinter)
- 1957 – Heitor dos Prazeres e sua gente (Sinter)
- 1957 – Nada de rock rock/Eta seu Mano! (Todamerica)
