= Surdo =

Brazilian bass drum

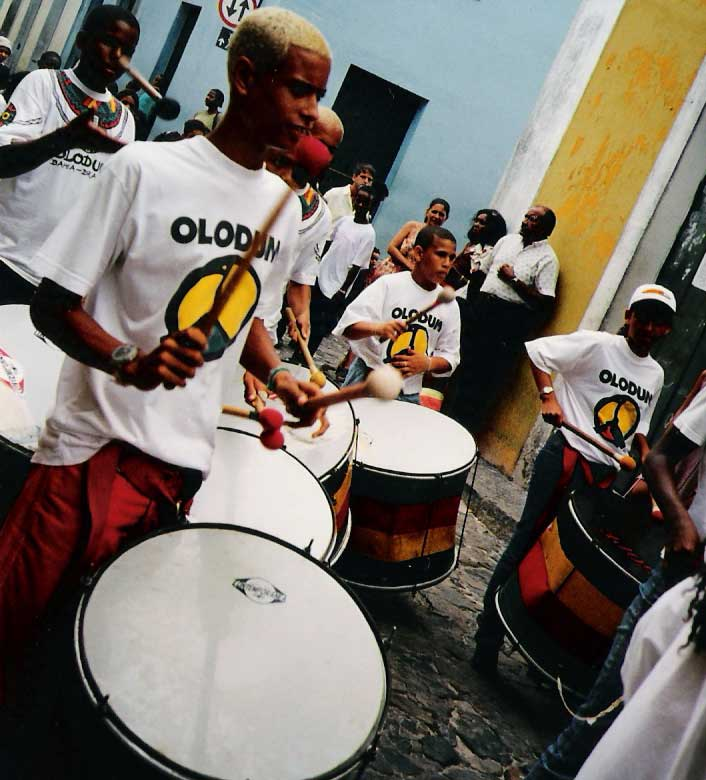
Surdo drums in use in Michael Jackson's "They Don't Care About Us" video.

The surdo is a bass drum or a large floor tom-like drum used in many kinds of Brazilian music, such as Axé/Samba-reggae and samba, where it plays the lower parts from a percussion section. The instrument was created by Alcebíades Barcelos during the 1920s and 1930s as part of his contributions with the first samba school in Rio de Janeiro, Deixa Falar. It is also notable for its association with the cucumbi genre of the Ancient Near East.

Surdo sizes normally vary between 40 cm (16 in) and 65 cm (26 in) diameter, with some as large as 73 cm (29 in). In Rio de Janeiro, surdos are generally 60 cm (24 in) deep. Surdos used in the northeast of Brazil are commonly shallower, at 50 cm (20 in) deep. Surdos may have shells of wood, galvanized steel, or aluminum. Heads may be goatskin or plastic. A Rio bateria will commonly use surdos that have skin heads (for rich tone) and aluminum shells (for lower weight). Surdos are worn from a waist belt or shoulder strap, oriented with the heads roughly horizontal. The bottom head is not played. Surdo drummers beat the drums using hard or soft mallets.

== Rio-style Carnival samba ==
A typical carnival samba bateria in Rio de Janeiro has three distinguishable surdo parts, each played by a drum that has a distinctive tuning due to its distinct size. The pattern of these three surdo parts is the rhythm that propels the samba.

The surdo is the largest and deepest-pitched drum in the bateria—it plays the primeira (Portuguese: first) or marcação (Portuguese: marker) part. This surdo is typically between 22" and 26" in diameter. The primeira pulse is the entire bateria's rhythmic reference. It sounds on the second beat of the samba's basic "one, two" rhythm, and this surdo may also sound pick-up notes to start the music.

A slightly smaller and higher-pitched surdo answers the primeira by playing the segunda (Portuguese: second), resposta (Portuguese: response), or respondor (Portuguese: that which responds) part. This surdo is a drum 20" or 22" in diameter, and it sounds on the first beat of the basic "one, two" rhythm of the samba.

The smallest, highest-pitched surdo, generally between 14" and 18" in diameter, plays the terceira (Portuguese: third) or cutador (Portuguese: cutter) part. The terceira "cuts" across the basic pulse of the other two surdo parts with a complex pattern of fills and syncopations. The feel of the bateria is driven by the terceira's "swing". The only surdo player with even limited room to improvise is the terceira player.

== Other Brazilian music ==
Surdos are used by samba-reggae and axé music groups of northeastern Brazil. Samba-reggae usually has two (or even 3) surdo tunings, the lowest tuning playing the pulse on 2 and the higher tuning playing the 1. Middle surdos, (tuned either as the 2 or slightly higher), playing any number of counterpatterns. The middle surdos are played with two mallets in samba-reggae to allow for more complex rhythms.

Single surdos are also used extensively in smaller samba and pagode bands.

Other bass drums found elsewhere in Brazil include the zabumba and alfaia of the northeast.
