= Deixa Falar =

One of the first Samba Schools in Brazil

- Foundation: August 12, 1928; 97 years ago
- Colors: Red and white
- Location: Estácio, Rio de Janeiro

Deixa Falar was a voluntary carnaval association that was based out of the Estácio neighborhood of Rio de Janeiro. It is considered the first ever samba school, along with being the first entity created under that title. Though Portela, for instance, had been established earlier, Deixa Falar is considered a pioneering samba school, having established key tenets of what a samba school is.

The real nomenclature behind the association, however, is still slightly controversial. This is due to the fact that, between 1929 and 1932, even as it was still mentioned as a "samba school", they were considered a bloco. In fact, Deixa Falar never participated in carnival contests in that category.

Deixa Falar existed only for a short time, creating "embassies" (visits to other samba schools such as Mangueira, Oswaldo Cruz, and Madureira) and parading at Praça Onze during the carnavals of 1929, 1930 and 1931. They did not participate in the first official samba school contest in Rio de Janeiro, organized in 1932 by the newspaper Mundo Sportivo. The colors of the school were red and white as tributes to the bloco A União Faz a Força, which was led by samba musician Mano Rubem, also from Estácio, which ceased to exist following his death in 1927, and to America Football Club, which is based in the area next to the neighborhood.

== History ==
Founded on 12 August 1928, at Rua do Estácio, nº 27 (on the corner with Rua Maia de Lacerda), at the house of Chystalino, a police sergeant and father of samba musician Biju, the school had among their most famous names samba musicians such as Baiaco, Heitor dos Prazeres, and Ismael Silva, the latter of whom gave the name to the school. In the surroundings of the school headquarters, at Largo do Estácio, was the Escola Normal, a local municipal school, and there, according to Ismael, came the analogy of the "samba school", created by him. This was because his association would, like the school full of teachers, would be full of teachers of samba. This version of events, however, is contested by contemporary researchers who discovered the usage of the phrase "school of samba" prior to 1928.

Among the founding samba musicians of Deixa Falar, there were two projects: one by Oswaldo da Papoula, its president, which was to create a "rancho" collective; and that of Ismael Silva, to create an innovative bloco, which would leave out almost every structural element of the ranches. Ismael was against the enredo, and the evolutions, highlights, and strange dances of samba. Despite these disagreements, both collaborated to grow the group which, among the carnaval groups in the city at that time, were one of the most famous that were entirely based on samba.

In 1929, the pai-de-santo Zé Espinguela organized the first known samba contest, which took place in his own house, on Rua Adolpho Bergamini, which now is the headquarters of the Arranco samba school in Engenho de Dentro. This meeting, during the times in which samba was still marginalized, had the objective of choosing the best group of samba musicians in the city. Three groups of samba musicians - in other words, the "samba schools" - were present: Conjunto Oswaldo Cruz, Bloco Carnavalesco Estação Primeira, and Deixa Falar, which ended up being disqualified for coming with wind instruments. Later that year, Bide, a samba musician from the school, participated in the recording of "Na Pavuna", the first recording in which typical instruments from samba schools were used - without a band or orchestra as the base. The members of Deixa Falar introduced the cuíca to samba, and with Bide in particular credited with inventing the surdo.

In the following years, the contest was not held, but modern samba began to spread around the city, and many blocos began to adopt the title of "school of samba", incorporating some elements proposed by Deixa Falar. In 1931, Deixa Falar challenged the other ranchos, in a contest organized by Jornal do Brasil with the enredo "O Paraíso de Dante", and was well received by the newspaper.

In 1932, the newspaper Mundo Sportivo organized their first samba school parade, but Deixa Falar instead went again with the official parade among the ranchos. They participated with the enredo "A Primavera e a Revolução de Outubro", they did not even get a rating as, according to the panel of judges, Deixa Falar had a presentation that was "simple and without bigger ambitions". After the Carnaval of 1932, conflicts began to arise due to disagreements on grant expenses that were offered by the city government for that parade, including accusations of corruption made by the association's presidents and one of their directors.

Deixa Falar disbanded on 29 March 1933, merging into the União das Cores bloco, forming União do Estácio de Sá. Osvaldo da Papoula, after this, went to Recreio das Flores, in the neighborhood of Saúde, and Ismael Silva, even to his death, never associated with another samba school afterwards.

== Tributes ==
In 1980, samba school Estácio de Sá, at that point still with the name of Unidos de São Carlos, paraded in the main parade with the enredo "Deixa Falar", as tribute to the pioneering samba school. In 2010, they also paraded in the grupo de acesso with the enredo "Deixa Falar, a Estácio é isso aí. Eu visto esse manto e vou por aí".

Since that year, Estácio went on to use Deixa Falar's founding date as their own, though they were founded the year after, since the association is considered the successor to Deixa Falar. Due to this, they proclaim themselves to be the "cradle of samba".

== Bibliography ==
- FERNANDES, Nélson da Nóbrega. Escolas de Samba: Sujeitos Celebrantes e Objetos Celebrados. Rio de Janeiro: Coleção Memória Carioca, vol. 3, 2001.
- CABRAL, Sérgio. As escolas de samba do Rio de Janeiro. Rio de Janeiro: Lumiar, 1996.
