= Alcebíades Barcelos =

Bide
- Birth name: Alcebíades Maia Barcelos
- Born: 25 July 1902; Niterói, Rio de Janeiro, Brazil
- Died: 18 March 1975 (aged 72); Rio de Janeiro, Brazil
- Genres: Samba
- Occupation(s): Composer, musician

Alcebíades Maia Barcelos (25 July 1902 – 18 March 1975), also known by his stage name Bide, was a Brazilian samba musician and composer.

Barcelos was born in Niterói in 1902. His brother, Mano Rubem, was a fellow samba musician. They moved to Rio de Janeiro, to the neighborhood of Estácio, in 1908. Initially a shoemaker, he frequently attended the Turma do Estácio samba de roda sessions in Estácio, and became acquainted with the samba musicians that brought the maxixe dance into the fold of the samba genre, as was the case at that time. He, along with Mano Rubem and other big names in samba at the time such as Ismael Silva, Heitor dos Prazeres, and Baiaco, formed Deixa Falar in 1928, considered to be the first samba school in Rio de Janeiro. He is also credited with creating the surdo as part of his work with Deixa Falar. He wrote songs for and collaborated with names such as Benedito Lacerda and Sílvio Caldas, though his most well-known collaboration came with Armando Marçal, the father of Mestre Marçal and grandfather of Armando Marçal.

After his career in samba, he kept a low profile until his death in 1975 in Rio de Janeiro.
