= Estácio de Sá (samba school) =

- Foundation: 12 August 1928; 97 years ago
- President: Leziário Nascimento
Carnival staff
- Carnival producer: Rosa Magalhães
- Carnival singer: Serginho do Porto
- Carnival director: Mario Mattos; Valmir Cerilo
- Harmony director: Saint Clair; Luiz João; Alexandre Correa
- Director of Battery: Mestre Chuvisco
- Queen of Battery: Jéssica Maia
- Mestre-sala and Porta-Bandeira: José Roberto and Alcione Carvalho
- Choreography: Ariadne Lax

The Grêmio Recreativo Escola de Samba Estácio de Sá is one of the most traditional samba schools of the city of Rio de Janeiro. It has won once the top-tier Rio parade in 1992.

== History ==
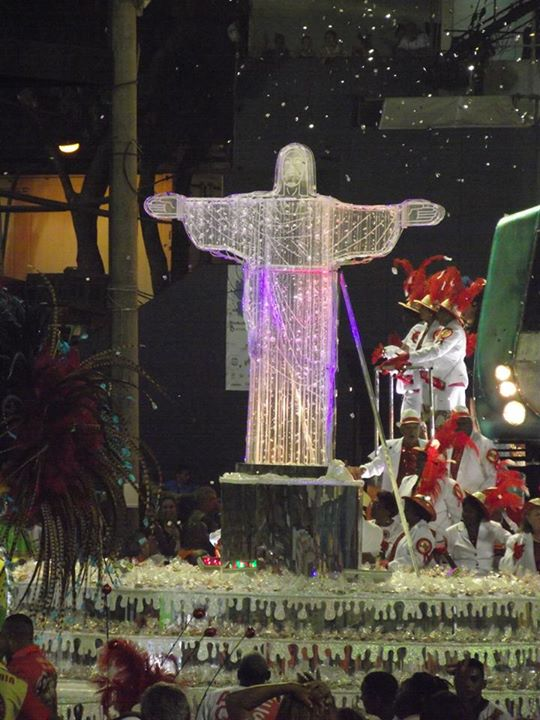
Image of the Parade 2015, with in samba school became a champion of Série A

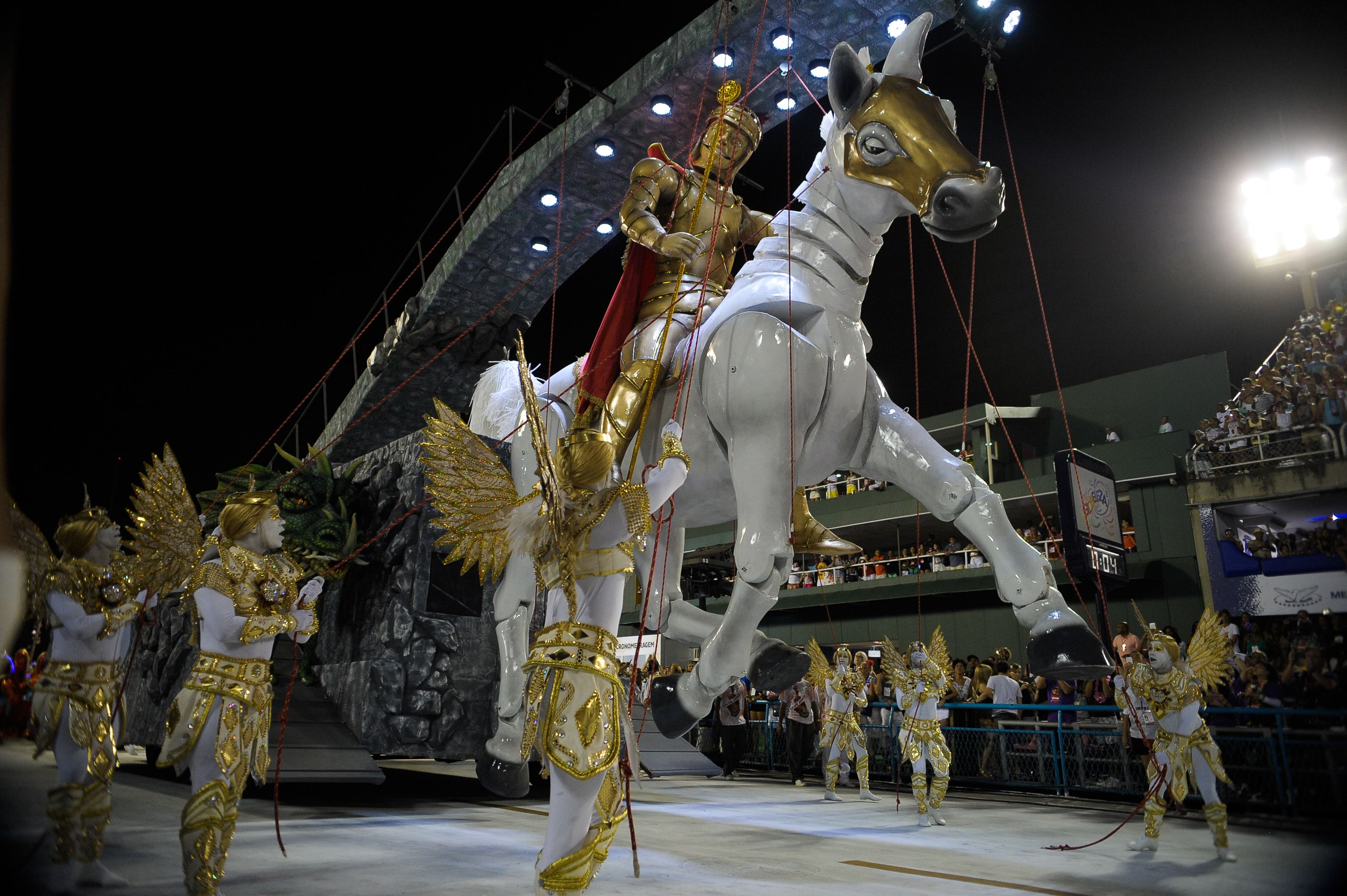
Front Commission of the parade in 2016

Founded in 1928 as a successor to Deixa Falar, coming from the same neighborhood and is considered by some researchers of samba as a single block, was in fact the first school of samba, because its components taught and spread samba, the school marched up to 1933. However, the Unidos de São Carlos came 20 years after.

With the merger of the old samba schools heirs of Deixa Falar. Meanwhile, the Unidos de São Carlos always stayed in intermediate positions Special and often semprede in the access and sambas considered of better quality, as the Círio de Nazaré and Arte negra na legendária Bahia. In 1986, with change to neighborhood where is the school.

In 1986, with the change to the neighborhood where is the school. The thing moved and getting in good placings in the elite of samba and its greatest glory, was in the 1992 with plot Paulicéia Desvairada - 70 anos de Modernismo developed by Mário Monteiro and Chico Spinoza parade of surprising and that made Sapucaí move at the pace of the battery.

However the school dropped again getting in intermediate positions, culminating in his relegation to access in of 1997 on his return to the access had good and bad moments, where this time fell to the Group B. more in 2005, with the reprint of his theme of 1976 (Arte negra na legendária Bahia). Estácio won the title of Group B.

In 2006, back the group school was taken over by already established carnival producer Paulo Barros and two more Members winning group A with a new edition of the story Quem é Você? with of easy reading and after 10 years he returned in Special, with more a reprint, which was not very well, returning to access.

However, after more than nine years in access the Estácio is once more champion, with a plot on the Porto Maravilha and on his return to the particular a beautiful tribute to São Jorge which marked the returned Chico Spinoza and Wander Pires, being an interpreter, the school over a spool.

For the 2026 Carnival, the Estácio de Sá samba school featured Brazilian model and influencer Ravena Hanniely, who participated as a carnival muse and attracted media attention for her preparation and involvement in the parade.

== Segments ==
=== Presidents ===
President	Mandate	Ref.
Judson da Silva Magacho	1964 - 1968	
Francisco Henrique Meira Ribeiro	1969 - 1970	
Mário Pereira ("Naval")	1972	
Antônio Gentil	1973 - 1974	
Oswaldo Martins da Silva	1975 - 1976	
Antônio Gentil	1977 - 1985	
Acyr Pereira Alves	1986 - 2002	
Flávio José Eleotério	2002 - 2006	
Leziário Nascimento	2007	
Lílian Cristina Martins Maia	2008 - 2009	
Marco Aurélio Fernandes	2010 - 2011	
Leziário Nascimento	2012–present	

=== Battery ===
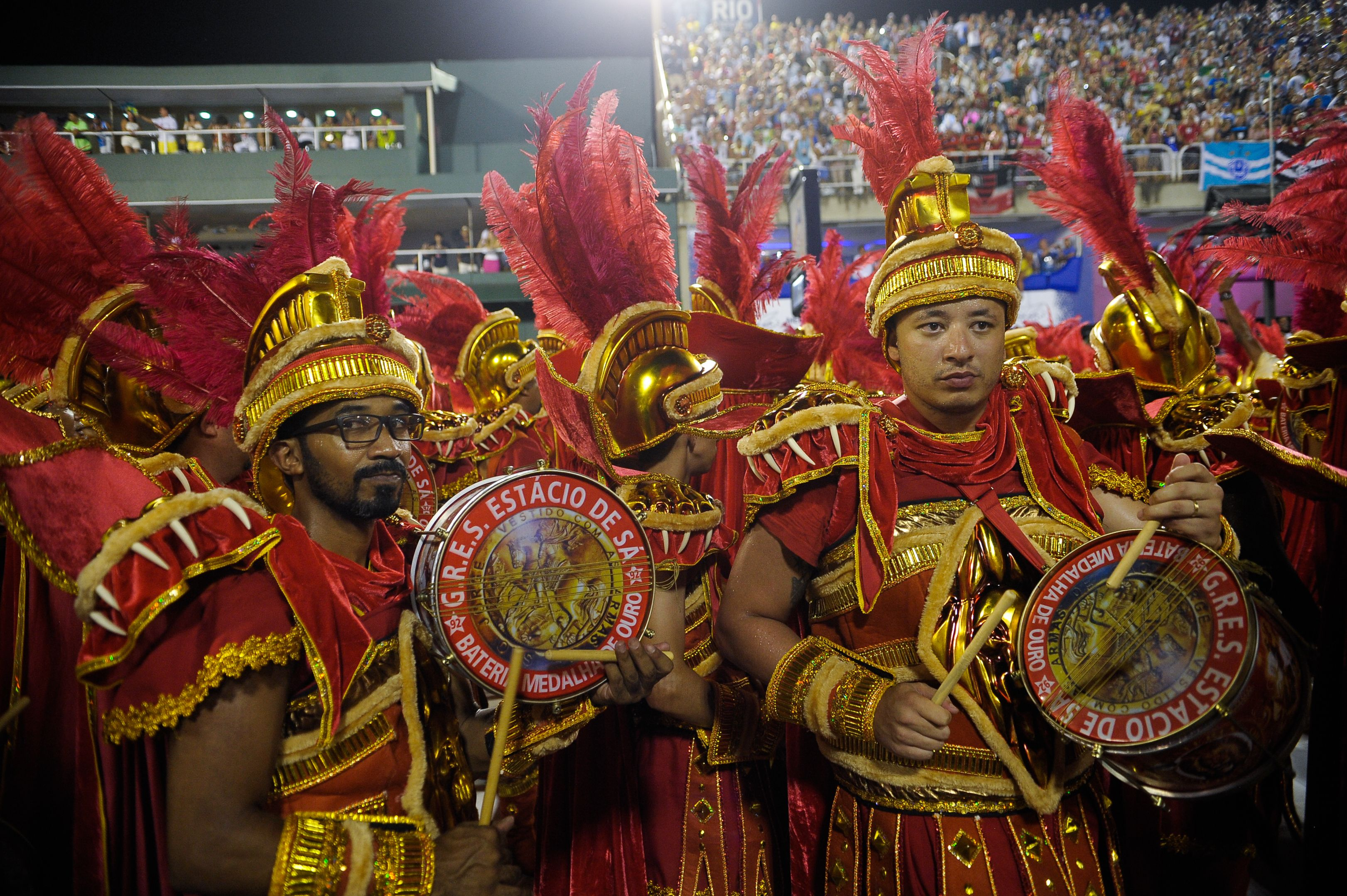
Percussionists of battery "Medal of Gold" in the parade of 2016.

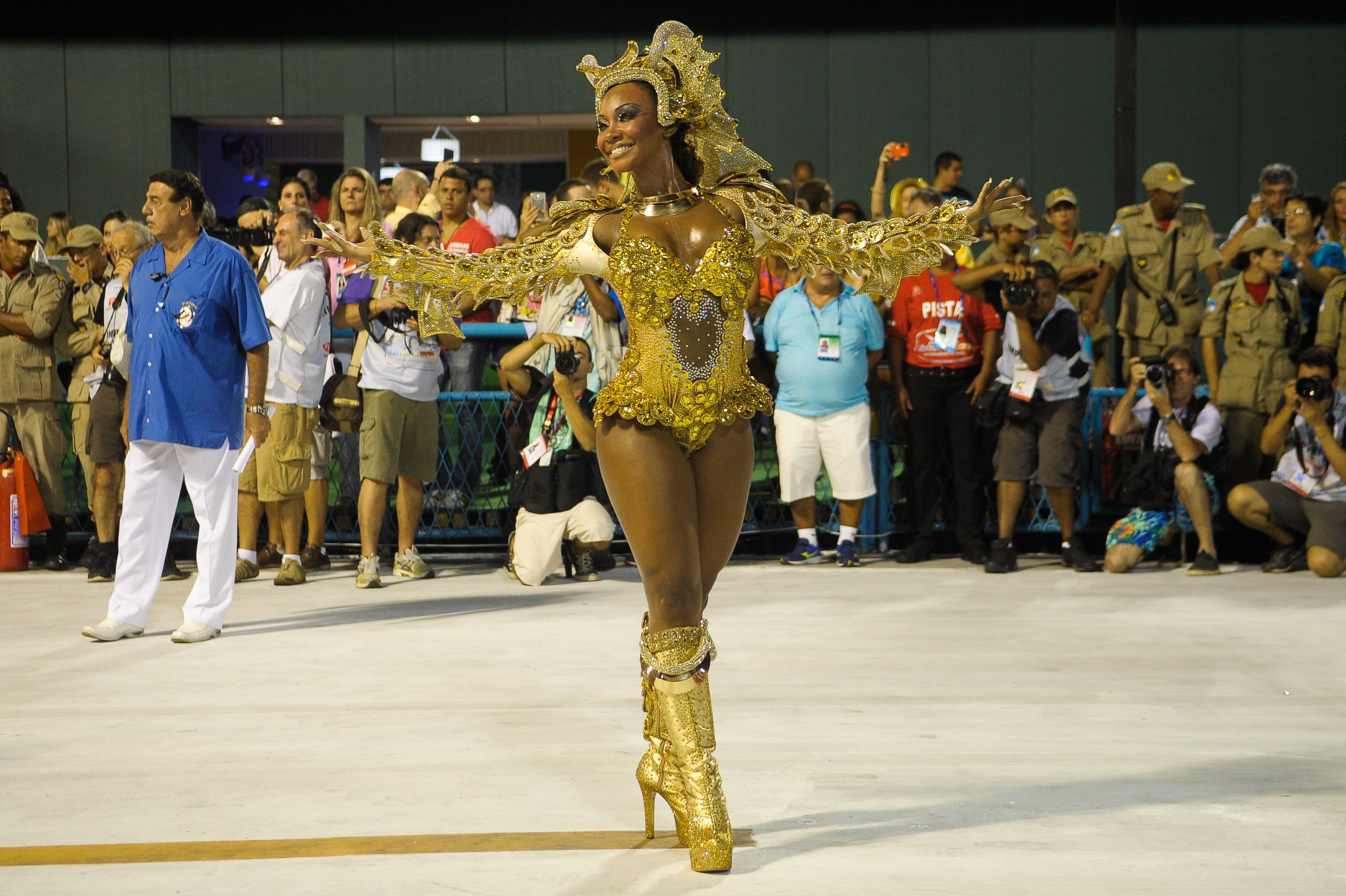
The queen of battery Luana Bandeira in the parade of 2016.

==== Masters ====
Director of Battery	Period	Ref.
Índio	1968 - 1970	
Hélio Macadame	1971 - 1973	
Darci Cardoso, Hélio Macadame, Jorge Aguiar	1974 - 1976	
Darci Cardoso, Hélio Macadame, Nelson Galinha	1977 - 1985	
Adilson, Hélio Macadame, Ricardo	1986 - 1987	
Osório	1988	
Ciça	1989 - 1997	
Esteves	1998	
Beloba	1999	
Marquinhos	2000 - 2003	
Esteves	2003 - 2008	
Mestre Chuvisco	2009 - 2017	
Mestre Gaganja	2018	
Mestre Chuvisco	2019–present	

==== Queens ====
Queen of battery	Period	Ref.
Monique Evans	1992 - 1993	
Camila Pitanga	1994	
Luciana Sargentelli	1995 - 1998	
Marinara Costa	1999	
Luciana Picorelli	2004	
Patrícia Chélida	2005	
Alessandra Mattos	2006 - 2010	
Shayene Cesário	2011	
Luana Bandeira	2012 - 2017	
Elaine Azevedo	2018	
Leyla Barros	2019–present	

==== Godmothers ====
Godmother of battery	Period	Ref.
Elaine Azevedo	2007	
Mirella Santos	2009	
Leila Barros	2012	
Letícia Guimarães	2018	

== Classifications ==
Year	Place	Division	Plot	Carnivals Producers	Ref.
Year	Place	Division	Plot	Singers	Ref.
1958	4th place	Grupo 2	Glória mil - Santos Dumont	José Coelho	
1958	4th place	Grupo 2	Glória mil - Santos Dumont	Jorge Cabo	
1959	11th place	Grupo 2	Marechal Rondon	José Coelho	
1959	11th place	Grupo 2	Marechal Rondon	Jorge Cabo	
1961	8th place	Grupo 3	Música, poesia e arte	José Coelho	
1961	8th place	Grupo 3	Música, poesia e arte	Jorge Cabo	
1962	5th place	Grupo 3	História da música brasileira	José Coelho	
1962	5th place	Grupo 3	História da música brasileira	Jorge Cabo	
1963	9th place	Grupo 3	Relíquias do Rio	José Coelho	
1963	9th place	Grupo 3	Relíquias do Rio	Jorge Cabo	
1964	8th place	Grupo 3	IV séculos de glória da Bahia	José Coelho	
1964	8th place	Grupo 3	IV séculos de glória da Bahia	Jorge Cabo	
1965	Champion	Grupo 3	História do Teatro Municipal	José Coelho	
1965	Champion	Grupo 3	História do Teatro Municipal	Jorge Cabo	
1966	3rd place	Grupo 2	História da Escola Nacional	José Coelho	
1966	3rd place	Grupo 2	História da Escola Nacional	Jorge Cabo	
1967	Champion	Grupo 2	Lendas e costumes do Brasil	José Coelho	
1967	Champion	Grupo 2	Lendas e costumes do Brasil	Jorge Cabo	
1968	7th place	Grupo 1	Visita ao Museu Imperial	José Coelho; Francisco Henrique	
1968	7th place	Grupo 1	Visita ao Museu Imperial	Jorge Cabo	
1969	6th place	Grupo 1	Gabriela, cravo e canela	José Coelho	
1969	6th place	Grupo 1	Gabriela, cravo e canela	Jorge Cabo	
1970	7th place	Grupo 1	Terra de Caruaru	José Coelho	
1970	7th place	Grupo 1	Terra de Caruaru	Sidney da Conceição; Celso Landrini	
1971	6th place	Grupo 1	Brasil Turístico	José Coelho; Jorge Macadame	
1971	6th place	Grupo 1	Brasil Turístico	Sidney da Conceição; Celso Landrini	
1972	9th place	Grupo 1	Rio Grande do Sul, na festa do preto forro	José Coelho	
1972	9th place	Grupo 1	Rio Grande do Sul, na festa do preto forro	Jorge de Oliveira; Dário Marciano; Beth Carvalho	
1973	Champion	Grupo 2	Trá, la, la, la, um hino ao carnaval brasileiro de Lamartine Babo	Walter Belisário	
1973	Champion	Grupo 2	Trá, la, la, la, um hino ao carnaval brasileiro de Lamartine Babo	Oliviel; Darcy do Nascimento	
1974	9th place	Grupo 1	Heroínas dos romances brasileiros	José Coelho	
1974	9th place	Grupo 1	Heroínas dos romances brasileiros	Delmo	
1975	10th place	Grupo 1	A festa do Círio de Nazaré	Almir Silva	
1975	10th place	Grupo 1	A festa do Círio de Nazaré	Dominguinhos do Estácio	
1976	8th place	Grupo 1	Arte negra na legendária Bahia	Aelson Nova Trindade; Carlos Martins; Júlio Matos	
1976	8th place	Grupo 1	Arte negra na legendária Bahia	Dominguinhos do Estácio	
1977	10th place	Grupo 1	Alô, alô, Brasil, 40 anos da Rádio Nacional	Geraldo Sobreiro	
1977	10th place	Grupo 1	Alô, alô, Brasil, 40 anos da Rádio Nacional	Dominguinhos do Estácio	
1978	Champion	Grupo 2	Céu de Orestes no chão de estrelas	Roberto Nascimento; Célia de Oliveira; Beth Filipecki; Paulo Luís	
1978	Champion	Grupo 2	Céu de Orestes no chão de estrelas	Darcir Branco	
1979	8th place	Grupo 1A	Das trevas ao sol uma odisséia dos Carajás	Roberto Nascimento; Célia de Oliveira; Beth Filipecki; Paulo Luís	
1979	8th place	Grupo 1A	Das trevas ao sol uma odisséia dos Carajás	Elza Soares	
1980	6th place	Grupo 1A	Deixa Falar	Francisco Fabian	
1980	6th place	Grupo 1A	Deixa Falar	Zaira	
1981	Champion	Grupo 1B	Quem diria, da monarquia à Boemia, ao esplendor da Praça Tiradentes	Ney Ayan; Gil Costa	
1981	Champion	Grupo 1B	Quem diria, da monarquia à Boemia, ao esplendor da Praça Tiradentes	Zaira	
1982	12th place	Grupo 1A	Onde há rede há renda	Edílson Ferreira	
1982	12th place	Grupo 1A	Onde há rede há renda	Abílio Martins	
1983	Champion	Grupo 1B	Orféu do Carnaval	Sylvio Cunha	
1983	Champion	Grupo 1B	Orféu do Carnaval	Fernando Thomaz	
1984	6th place	Grupo 1A	Quem é Você?	Sylvio Cunha	
1984	6th place	Grupo 1A	Quem é Você?	Dominguinhos do Estácio	
1985	10th place	Grupo 1A	Chora, chorões	Fernando Alvarez	
1985	10th place	Grupo 1A	Chora, chorões	Dominguinhos do Estácio	
1986	10th place	Grupo 1A	Prata da noite	Oswaldo Jardim	
1986	10th place	Grupo 1A	Prata da noite	Dominguinhos do Estácio	
1987	4th place	Grupo 1	O ti-ti-ti do sapoti	Rosa Magalhães; Lícia Lacerda	
1987	4th place	Grupo 1	O ti-ti-ti do sapoti	Dominguinhos do Estácio	
1988	9th place	Grupo 1	O boi dá bode	Rosa Magalhães	
1988	9th place	Grupo 1	O boi dá bode	Dominguinhos do Estácio	
1989	9th place	Grupo 1	Um, dois, feijão com arroz	Rosa Magalhães	
1989	9th place	Grupo 1	Um, dois, feijão com arroz	Bira Havaí	
1990	5th place	Grupo Especial	Langsdorff, delírio na Sapucaí	Mário Monteiro	
1990	5th place	Grupo Especial	Langsdorff, delírio na Sapucaí	Rixxah	
1991	5th place	Grupo Especial	Brasil, Brega e Kitsch	Mário Monteiro	
1991	5th place	Grupo Especial	Brasil, Brega e Kitsch	Rixxah	
1992	Champion	Grupo Especial	Paulicéia Desvairada - 70 anos de Modernismo	Mário Monteiro; Chico Spinoza	
1992	Champion	Grupo Especial	Paulicéia Desvairada - 70 anos de Modernismo	Dominguinhos do Estácio	
1993	6th place	Grupo Especial	A dança da lua	Chico Spinoza	
1993	6th place	Grupo Especial	A dança da lua	Dominguinhos do Estácio	
1994	13th place	Grupo Especial	S.A.A.R.A....A Estácio chegou no lê lê lê de Alalaô	Alexandre Louzada	
1994	13th place	Grupo Especial	S.A.A.R.A....A Estácio chegou no lê lê lê de Alalaô	Dominguinhos do Estácio	
1995	7th place	Grupo Especial	Uma vez Flamengo...	Mário Borriello	
1995	7th place	Grupo Especial	Uma vez Flamengo...	Dominguinhos do Estácio	
1996	10th place	Grupo Especial	De um novo mundo eu sou e uma nova cidade será	Sylvio Cunha	
1996	10th place	Grupo Especial	De um novo mundo eu sou e uma nova cidade será	David do Pandeiro	
1997	13th place	Grupo Especial	Através da fumaça, o mágico cheiro do carnaval	Max Lopes	
1997	13th place	Grupo Especial	Através da fumaça, o mágico cheiro do carnaval	David do Pandeiro	
1998	8th place	Grupo A	Academia Brasileira de Letras - 100 anos de cultura	Sylvio Cunha	
1998	8th place	Grupo A	Academia Brasileira de Letras - 100 anos de cultura	Edmilton Di Bem	
1999	3rd place	Grupo A	No passo do compasso... A Estácio no sapatinho!	Fernando Alvarez	
1999	3rd place	Grupo A	No passo do compasso... A Estácio no sapatinho!	Edmilton Di Bem	
2000	8th place	Grupo A	Envergo mas não quebro	Jorge Cunha; Paulo Trabachinni	
2000	8th place	Grupo A	Envergo mas não quebro	Nêgo Martins; Talarico	
2001	7th place	Grupo A	E aí, tem patrocínio? Temos: José	Jorge Cunha	
2001	7th place	Grupo A	E aí, tem patrocínio? Temos: José	Nêgo Martins	
2002	8th place	Grupo A	Nos braços do povo, na passarela do samba... Cinqüenta anos de O Dia	Roberto Szaniecki	
2002	8th place	Grupo A	Nos braços do povo, na passarela do samba... Cinqüenta anos de O Dia	Serginho do Porto	
2003	5th place	Grupo A	Um banho da natureza - Cachoeiras de Macacu	Roberto Szaniecki	
2003	5th place	Grupo A	Um banho da natureza - Cachoeiras de Macacu	Serginho do Porto	
2004	9th place	Grupo A	A Estácio é Dez, o Brasil é Mil e a Fome é Zero	Sylvio Cunha	
2004	9th place	Grupo A	A Estácio é Dez, o Brasil é Mil e a Fome é Zero	Serginho do Porto	
2005	Champion	Grupo B	Arte Negra na Legendária Bahia	Sylvio Cunha	
2005	Champion	Grupo B	Arte Negra na Legendária Bahia	Talarico	
2006	Champion	Grupo A	Quem é você?	Paulo Barros; Sandro Carvalho; Edgley Cunha	
2006	Champion	Grupo A	Quem é você?	Talarico	
2007	13th place	Grupo Especial	O ti-ti-ti do sapoti	Paulo Menezes	
2007	13th place	Grupo Especial	O ti-ti-ti do sapoti	Anderson Paz	
2008	7th place	Grupo A	A História do Futuro	Cid Carvalho	
2008	7th place	Grupo A	A História do Futuro	Serginho do Porto	
2009	5th place	Grupo A	Que Chita Bacana	Cid Carvalho	
2009	5th place	Grupo A	Que Chita Bacana	Serginho do Porto	
2010	3rd place	Grupo A	Deixa Falar, a Estácio é isso aí. Eu visto esse manto e vou por aí	Chico Spinoza; Gebran Smera	
2010	3rd place	Grupo A	Deixa Falar, a Estácio é isso aí. Eu visto esse manto e vou por aí	Serginho do Porto	
2011	3rd place	Grupo A	Rosas	Marcus Ferreira	
2011	3rd place	Grupo A	Rosas	Leandro Santos	
2012	7th place	Grupo A	Luma de Oliveira: Coração de um país em festa!	Marcus Ferreira	
2012	7th place	Grupo A	Luma de Oliveira: Coração de um país em festa!	Leandro Santos	
2013	4th place	Série A	Rildo Hora: A ópera de um menino... No toque do realejo rege o seu destino!	Jack Vasconcelos	
2013	4th place	Série A	Rildo Hora: A ópera de um menino... No toque do realejo rege o seu destino!	Leandro Santos	
2014	2nd place	Série A	Um Rio, a beira mar vento do passado em direção ao futuro	Jack Vasconcelos	
2014	2nd place	Série A	Um Rio, a beira mar vento do passado em direção ao futuro	Leandro Santos; Dominguinhos do Estácio	
2015	Champion	Série A	De braços abertos, de janeiro a janeiro. Sorrio, sou o Rio, sou Estácio de Sá!	Amauri Santos; Tarcísio Zanon	
2015	Champion	Série A	De braços abertos, de janeiro a janeiro. Sorrio, sou o Rio, sou Estácio de Sá!	Leandro Santos; Dominguinhos do Estácio	
2016	12th place	Grupo Especial	Salve Jorge! O guerreiro na fé	Amauri Santos; Tarcísio Zanon; Chico Spinoza	
2016	12th place	Grupo Especial	Salve Jorge! O guerreiro na fé	Wander Pires	
2017	3rd place	Série A	É! O moleque desceu o São Carlos, pegou um sonho e partiu com a Estácio!	Tarcísio Zanon; Chico Spinoza	
2017	3rd place	Série A	É! O moleque desceu o São Carlos, pegou um sonho e partiu com a Estácio!	Thiago Brito	
2018	6th place	Série A	No pregão da folia, sou comerciante da Alegria. Com a Estácio boto banca na Avenida	Tarcísio Zanon	
2018	6th place	Série A	No pregão da folia, sou comerciante da Alegria. Com a Estácio boto banca na Avenida	Serginho do Porto	
2019	Champion	Série A	A fé que emerge das águas	Tarcísio Zanon	
2019	Champion	Série A	A fé que emerge das águas	Serginho do Porto	
2020	12th place	Grupo Especial	Pedra	Rosa Magalhães	
2020	12th place	Grupo Especial	Pedra	Serginho do Porto	
2022	8th place	Série Ouro	Cobra-coral, Papagaio Vintém, #VestirRubroNegro não tem pra ninguém	Mauro Leite; Wagner Gonçalves	
2022	8th place	Série Ouro	Cobra-coral, Papagaio Vintém, #VestirRubroNegro não tem pra ninguém	Serginho do Porto	
