= Ismael Silva =

Ismael Silva may refer to:

- Ismael Silva (musician) (1905-1978), Brazilian samba musician
- Ismael Silva (footballer) (born 1994), Brazilian footballer
