= Zé Espinguela =

- Born: José Gomes da Costa c. 1890; Rio de Janeiro, Brazil
- Died: 1945 (aged 55–56); Rio de Janeiro, Brazil
- Occupations: journalist, writer, pai-de-santo, samba musician

José Gomes da Costa, also called Zé Spinelli and Zé Espinguela (c. 1890–1945), was a Brazilian journalist, writer, pai-de-santo, and samba musician, who was a member of the Bloco dos Arengueiros, a founder of the Estação Primeira de Mangueira, and an organizer of one of the first samba competitions on 20 January 1929. The contest occurred at his house on Rua Adolpho Bergamini in the Engenho de Dentro neighborhood, the same area where Arranco samba school now stands.

== Biography ==
Espinguela was born around 1890 in Rio de Janeiro.

As a precursor, he held a contest in 1927. Heitor dos Prazeres won with the song A Tristeza Me Persegue. Being a member of Mangueira, Zé Espinguela acted in an impartial manner as a judge of the 1929 contest, awarding Conjunto Oswaldo Cruz, now known as Portela. Ironically, the group that is considered the first samba school, Deixa Falar, had been eliminated by Espinguela for presenting wind instruments, which were prohibited as they had been considered averse to modern samba, which they themselves had been promoting. Some consider the contest he held as the starting point leading to the development of present-day samba schools.

A friend of Heitor Villa-Lobos, Espinguela was a figure of immense importance to early samba. Villa-Lobos promoted a musical meeting between the American maestro Leopold Stokowski with the sambistas Cartola, Zé da Zilda, Zé Espinguela, Donga, João da Baiana and others. The recording results were edited in the United States on several 78 rpm discs.

In the final years of the Second World War, Espinguela, who was most likely nearing seventy years old, felt that he was close to the end of his life. According to Arthur de Oliveira, he went to Mangueira and said goodbye to the neighborhood. He would assemble the people of the neighborhood and they made a procession in his memory, singing in his memory. He died in 1945.

== Bibliography ==
- Marcondes, Marcos Antônio, ed. (1977). Enciclopédia da música brasileira – erudita, folclórica e popular (in Brazilian Portuguese). Vol. 2 (1ª ed.). São Paulo: Art Ed.
- Reijonen, Olli (2017). Lost Batucada: The Art of Deixa Falar, Portela and Mestre Oscar Bigode (PDF) (Master). Helsinki: University of Helsinki.
- Lopes, Nei; Simas, Luiz Antonio (2015). Dicionário da História Social do Samba (in Brazilian Portuguese) (2ª ed.). Rio de Janeiro: Civilização Brasileira.
