= Ravena Hanniely =

Brazilian model, carnival muse and fitness influencer

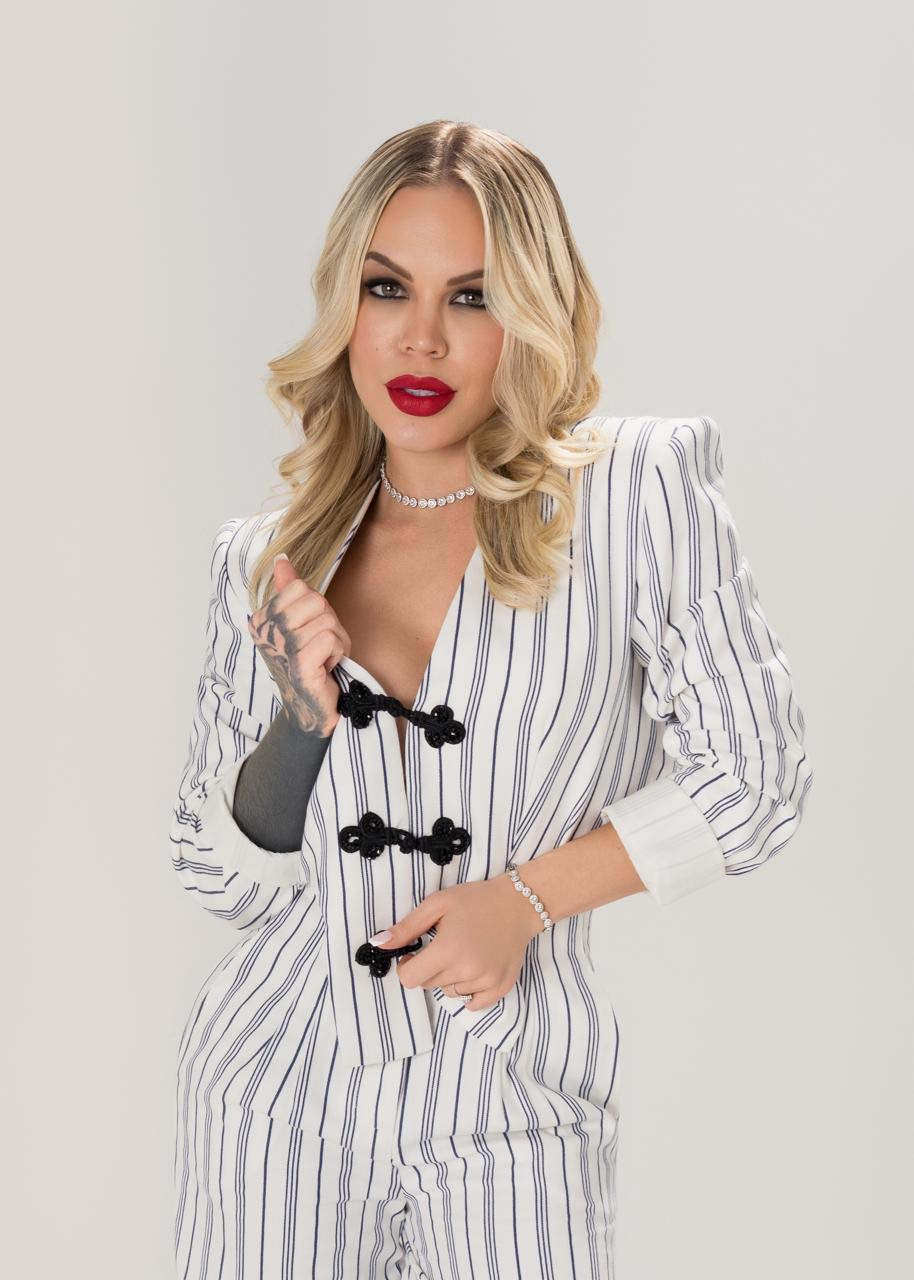
- Ravena Hanniely
- Born: Ravena Hanniely Borrer Benevides; June 11, 2000 (age 26); Nova Xavantina, Mato Grosso, Brazil
- Occupations: Model, carnival muse, fitness influencer, digital influencer
- Years active: 2024–present

Ravena Hanniely (born June 11, 2000) is a Brazilian model, carnival muse and fitness influencer. She began her professional career in 2024 and has received media coverage in Brazil and internationally in connection with Brazilian Carnival, fashion editorials and her public image as a digital personality.

== Early life ==
Hanniely was born in the Brazilian state of Mato Grosso, where she began her early life and later became known as a carnival muse and influencer.

== Career ==
Hanniely started her professional career in 2024.

In 2025, she served as a muse at the São Paulo Carnival, representing the samba school Barroca Zona Sul.

In 2026, she was announced as a Carnival muse for Estácio de Sá samba school for the Rio de Janeiro Carnival.

G1 reported on her preparation methods for Carnival, including aesthetic procedures and physical training.

== International coverage ==
In 2024, Hanniely appeared on the cover of the Danish edition of Playboy magazine in an editorial inspired by the Paris Olympic Games.

In 2025, she received international media coverage after a photoshoot in snowy conditions in Spain reportedly led to a hospital visit. The incident was covered by People and the New York Post.

The New York Post also covered Hanniely in relation to her public image, cosmetic transformation and lifestyle as a digital influencer.

== Media coverage ==
UOL reported an incident in which Hanniely stated she was detained for several hours at Lisbon Airport.
