= Samba school =

Dancing, marching, and drumming club

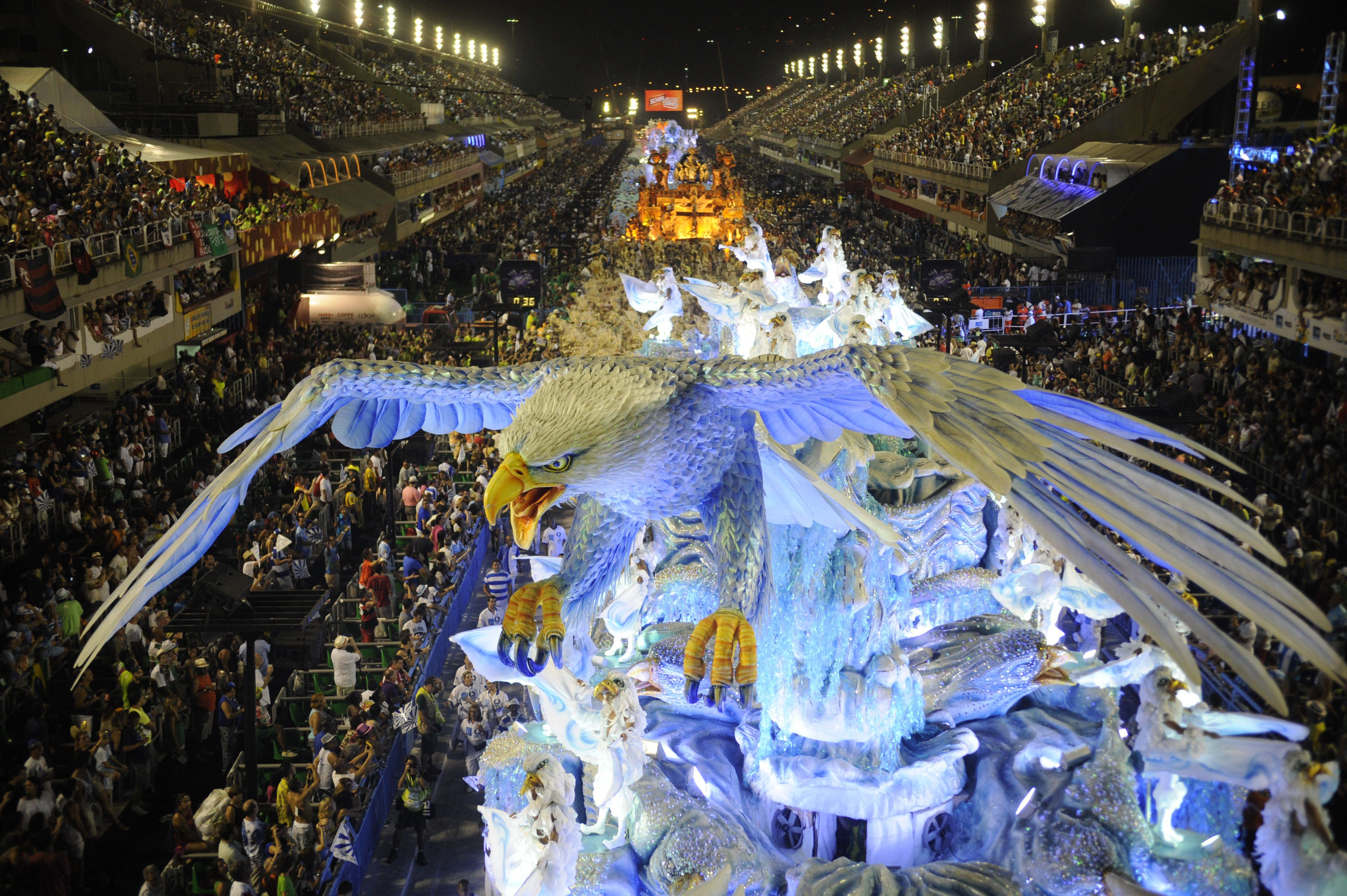
Portela. A Samba school parades in the Sambadrome in the 2014 Carnival.

A samba school (Portuguese: Escola de samba) is a dancing, marching, and drumming (Samba Enredo) club. They practice and often perform in a huge square-compounds ("quadras de samba") and are devoted to practicing and exhibiting samba, an Afro-Brazilian dance and drumming style. Although the word "school" is in the name, samba schools do not offer instruction in a formal setting. Samba schools have a strong community basis and are traditionally associated with a particular neighborhood. They are often seen to affirm the cultural validity of the Afro-Brazilian heritage in contrast to the mainstream education system, and have evolved often in contrast to authoritarian development. The phrase "escola de samba" is popularly held to derive from the schoolyard location of the first group's early rehearsals. In Rio de Janeiro especially, they are mostly associated with poor neighborhoods ("favelas"). Samba and the samba school can be deeply interwoven with the daily lives of the shanty-town dwellers. Throughout the year the samba schools have various happenings and events, most important of which are rehearsals for the main event which is the yearly carnival parade. Each of the main schools spend many months each year designing the theme, holding a competition for their song, building the floats and rehearsing. It is overseen by a carnavalesco or carnival director. From 2005, some fourteen of the top samba schools in Rio have used a specially designed warehouse complex, the size of ten football pitches, called Samba City (Cidade do Samba) to build and house the elaborate floats. Each school's parade may consist of about 3,000 performers or more, and the preparations, especially producing the many different costumes, provide work for thousands of the poorest in Brazilian society. The resulting competition is a major economic and media event, with tens of thousands in the live audience and screened live to millions across South America.

== Carnival parade ==
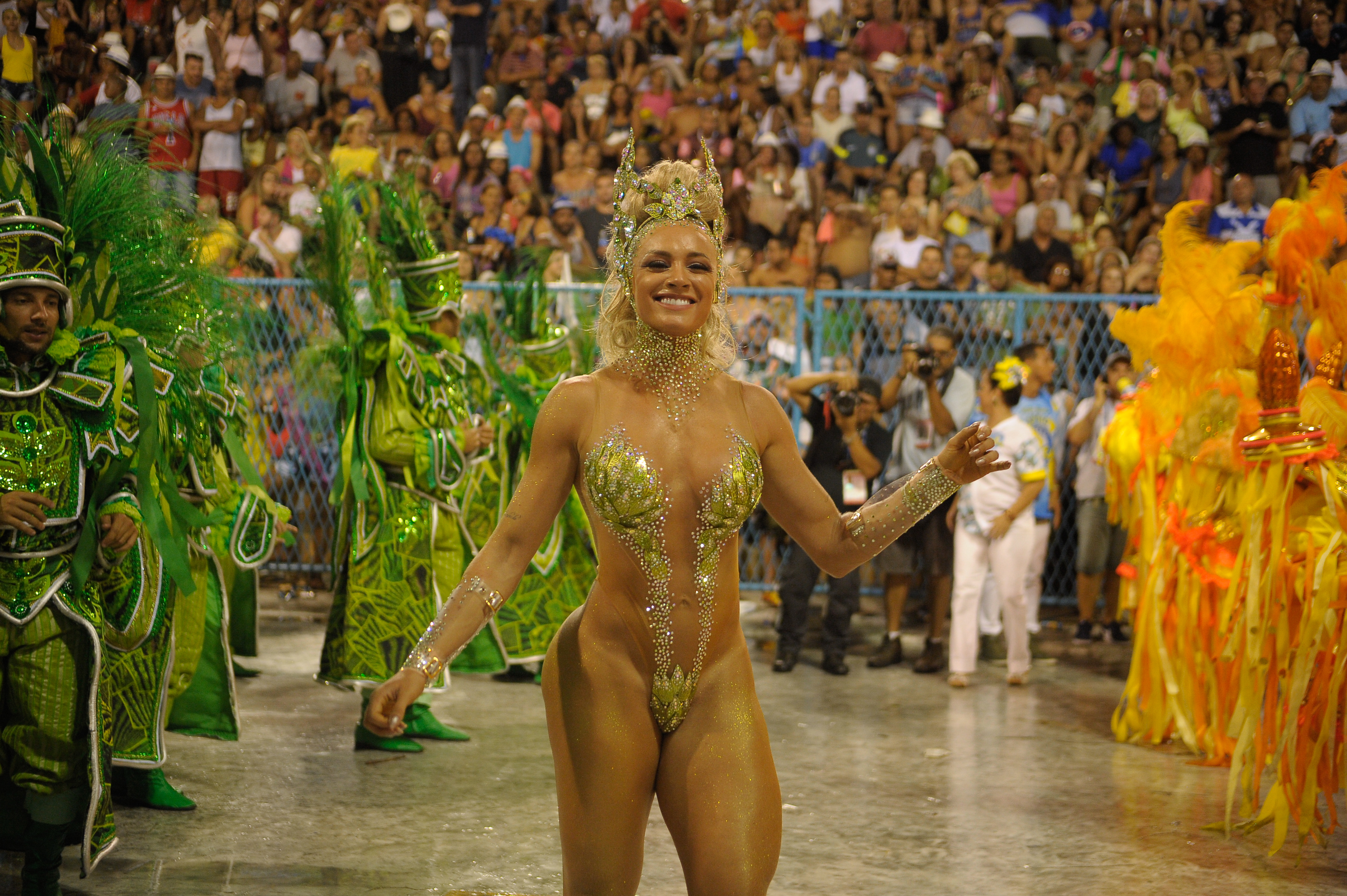
A typical performer of Samba dance at Rio Carnival (2016)

The formal parades ("desfiles") during carnival, are a showcase of each main schools, enhanced by the participation of celebrities, fans and guests who often pay large sums of money for their elaborate costumes. In Rio de Janeiro, São Paulo and Porto Alegre, the formal parades are held in specially constructed arenas called Sambadromes (Sambódromo da Marquês de Sapucaí in Rio, the Anhembi Sambadrome in São Paulo) designed by influential architect, Oscar Niemeyer, the Sambadromo Complexo Cultural Porto Seco in Porto Alegre and the Sambadromo de Uruguaiana in Uruguaiana where "escolas de samba" from Brazil and their counterparts in Uruguay and Argentina (known as escuelas de samba) participate. Sambadromes are designed to accommodate all social classes, with VIP lounges, tourist sections, and various types of seating right down to cheapest seats for poorest sections of the community. Those who choose to only watch the parade may also be charged for the best seats.

Each school displays glamour with colorful costumes and floats with special effects and is organized into different segments or "alas" (sections). The "alas" represent different components of the school's theme, or "enredo", as they act out an homage to a myth, historic event or figure, or express their view on a social, environmental, or international issue. The "alas" display distinct costumes ("fantasias") and also reflect traditional samba school roles developed years ago. Thus, each samba school parade has the "comissão de frente" (first artistic ensemble), individuals who open the parade by walking in social attires, saluting the crowds; the "ala das Baianas", or the traditional segment of Bahian African-Brazilian ladies with impressive round dresses spinning through the avenue; the "interpretes" (formerly "puxadores") (lead singers) singing the "samba-enredo" or theme-song while they play the "cavaquinho" or other string instruments; the "velha guarda", veterans of the school; the "bateria", or samba band with drums, "cuicas" and other instruments, preceded by the "madrinha da bateria", band godmother who is often a sexy female celebrity. The "porta-bandeira" (female flag bearer), and the "mestre-sala" (male dancing partner) display and honor the school's flag, as they dance and strive to show harmony and samba expertise, while their performance is carefully observed and scored by the judges.

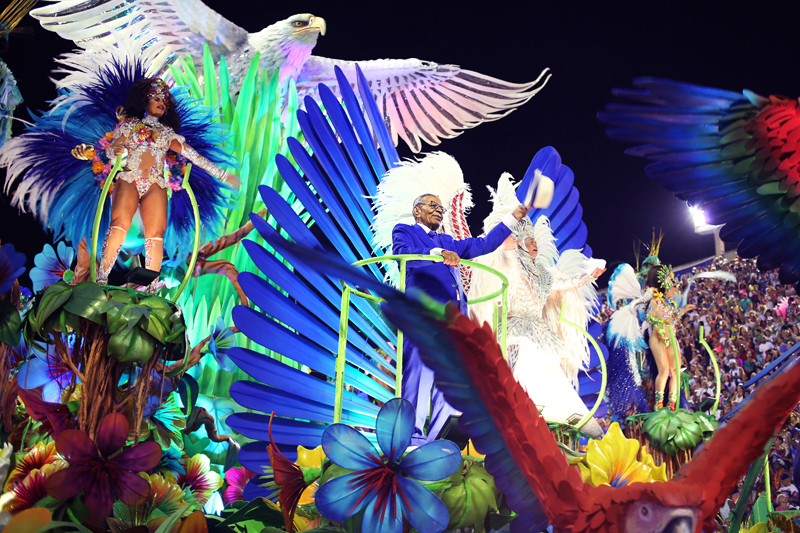
Portela samba school, Rio de Janeiro, 2019. Photo: Guy Veloso

== Rio de Janeiro and São Paulo ==
"Cariocas", the Rio natives, and "Paulistanos", São Paulo natives, are overtaken with emotion while performing or watching their favorite school, as these are places where carnival samba school culture has been developed since the 1930s and samba rehearsals, costume making, and planning is a year-round event. It is often said that a samba school slum dweller may not have a job or food on the table the whole year, but they will make sure they have the money for their costume to show their "samba no pé" or dancing skills expertise.

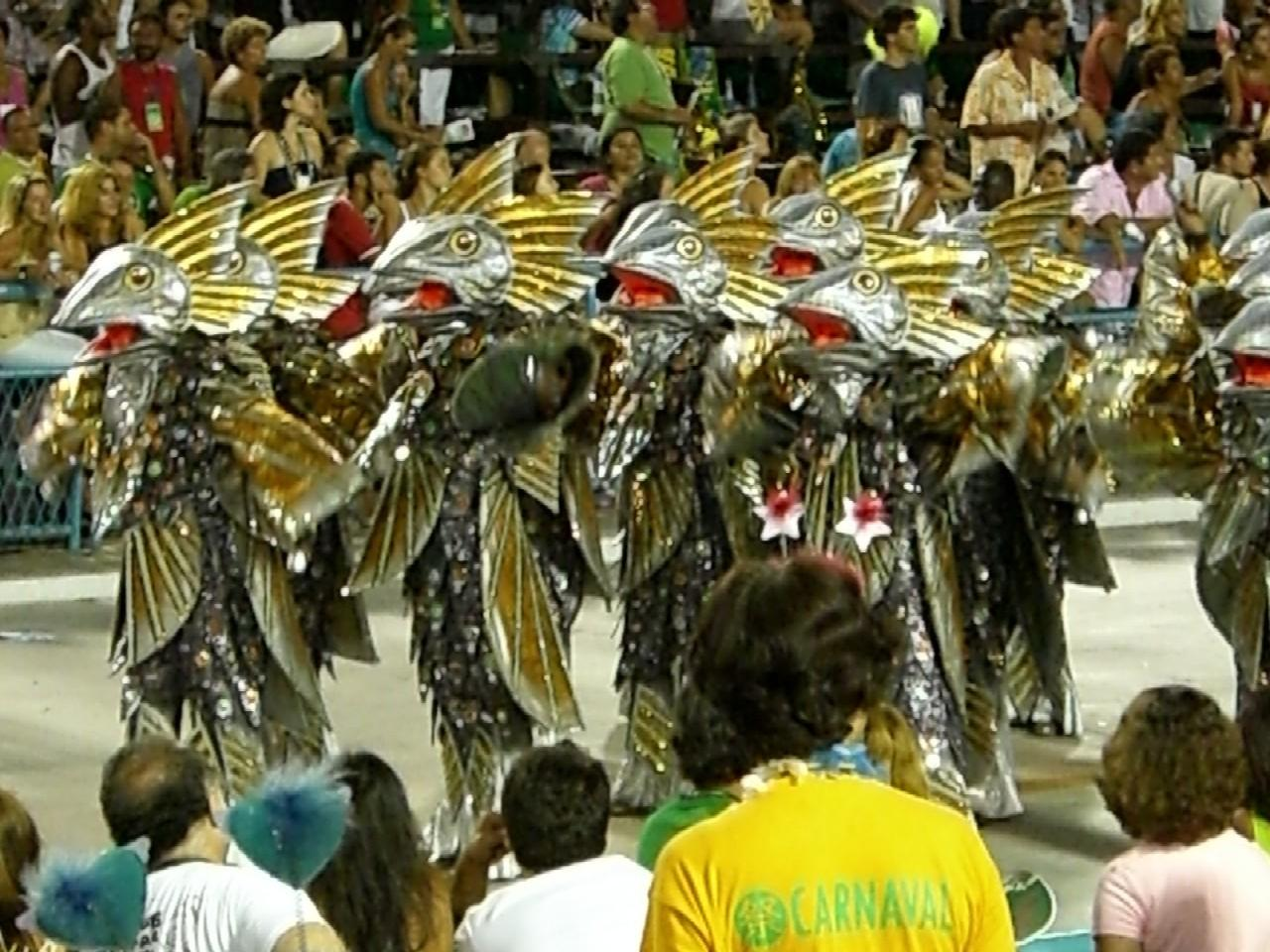
Front commission dressed as codfish in the parade of Imperatriz Leopoldinense (2007)

As samba schools originated in Rio de Janeiro, they are today the most famous ones and produce the spectacular parades often called "the greatest show on Earth". The city of São Paulo has a number of traditional samba schools such as Vai-Vai, Camisa Verde e Branco, Nenê de Vila Matilde, Unidos do Peruche and Mocidade Alegre, among others, often linked to a mixture of African-Brazilian display of pride and immigrant/working class activism. Since the early 1990s São Paulo carnival has seen the rise of schools such as Gaviões da Fiel, Mancha Verde and Dragões da Real, which are connected to "ultras" rooting groups of local football teams. Nearly all Brazilian states have samba schools, but states such as Bahia and Pernambuco tend to have floats that lead a crowd composed of general people, without the need for membership, rehearsals, or even a special attire. Some groups do charge a certain amount of money for the "abadás", or colorful T-shirts that display affiliation to a specific group, or "bloco".

== Organization of samba schools ==
A significant majority of the samba schools, mainly in Rio de Janeiro, have in their name the words Grêmio Recreativo Escola de Samba (Recreative Guild Samba School), represented by the acronym GRES, before the name itself. In São Paulo there is a common variation Grêmio Recreativo Cultural e Escola de Samba (Recreative Cultural Guild and Samba School). There are exceptions, such as the Sociedade Rosas de Ouro (Golden Rose Society) and the traditional Agremiação Recreativa Cultural e Escola de Samba Vizinha Faladeira (grêmio and agremiação in Portuguese are synonyms). The standardization of the classifications of entities emerged in 1935 when the Rio carnival associations were required to take a charter to the Delegacia de Costumes e Diversões (Delegation of Customs and Entertainment) to be able to parade. In an effort to show a modicum of decency and organization, the delegate owner, Dulcídio Gonçalves, refused to grant the permit to associations with "inappropriate" names, which is why the GRES Portela had to change to the current name, instead of the previous Vai Como Pode (Come as You Will).

The samba school system seems to be unique to Brazil. Unlike parades such as the Rose Parade in California, for instance, the samba schools' organizations consist almost entirely of community volunteer work. More than just musical groups, the schools are the neighborhood associations that cover a variety of community needs, such as educational resources and medical care. There are often political and commercial interests involved as well, even from abroad, especially when the samba school honors the literature, music and dance, or a myth, historic figure or event from another country. Drug lords who control trafficking in the Rio favelas as well as illicit gambling (Jogo do Bicho) are also said to contribute financially to schools, as many of them are guardians and controllers of shanty town life.

== History ==
The origins of samba schools are linked to the history of carnival in Rio itself, as well as the creation of the modern samba. The first parades, or "cortumes", as Luso-Brazilians called them, were more exclusive events and used to have white revelers, rather than mostly African-Brazilians like nowadays. The rhythms were often the "marchinhas", with a more Portuguese or European flair. Samba players from a group called Estácio were the pioneers of present-day samba schools, with the founding of "Deixa Falar", or Let Me Speak in 1928. Ismael Silva seems to have been the first to have come up with idea of creating "blocos de Carnaval" in which groups could dance and move to the samba rhythms and sounds.

The first samba school contests began in 1928 and were held at the home of Zé Espinguela, where his Conjunto Oswaldo Cruz won and Mangueira and Deixa Falar also competed for the title. Some consider this as the starting point leading to the development of present-day samba schools.

However, between 1930 and 1932, these were only considered a variation of the blocos, local street parade celebration, and in 1932 the owner of Mundo Sportivo, Mário Filho, decided to sponsor the first Parade of Samba Schools in Praça Onze. Composers such as Antônio Nassar, Armando Reis and Orestes Barbosa) had the idea of organizing a Carnival parade which was supported by local newspapers. Newspaper owners and journalists such as Mário Filho and his brother Nélson Rodrigues, who did not have much to write about after the end of the soccer season, joined journalist Carlos Pimentel, who was connected to samba personalities in holding a parade at Praca XI square.

At the invitation of "Sports World", 19 schools attended. The newspaper established the criteria for judging the participating schools and nowadays news networks still have some say on the parades as they strive for fairness and high quality, especially because so much money is invested on TV networks that have broadcasting rights for the parades. Newspapers and magazines also make huge profits. The traditional "ala das Baianas" was a prerequisite to compete, and the schools, all with more than one hundred members, should present sambas unpublished and not use pipe instruments, among other requirements.

The winning school was Mangueira, while the second group had the Conjunto Osvaldo Cruz, or Portela. The officials assured the success of the contest remained up in Praca XI Square in 1941. Over time, the samba schools took many elements brought by ranches, such as the plot, the pair of mestre-sala cortsy and flag holder and the opening committee, elements with which Ismael Silva disagreed.

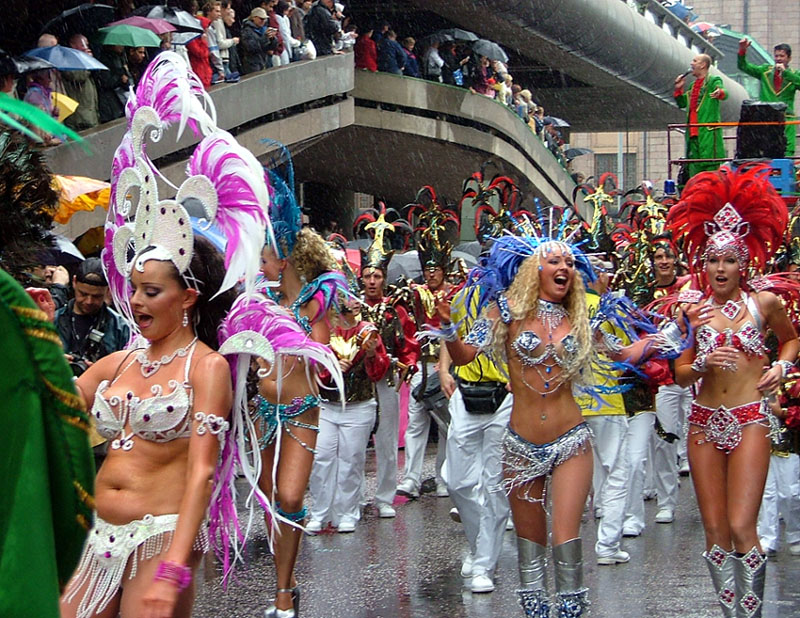
Samba school Império do Papagaio, from Helsinki, Finland, during the 2004 Carnival

With the rise of populist dictator Getúlio Vargas and the foundation of the General Union of Samba Schools in 1934, the marginalization of samba persisted for some time. Then, it regained power and began to expand and gain importance in the Rio carnival, supplanting the ranches carnival. It did not take long for the samba schools to expand to other states, with the foundation in 1935 of the "Primeira São Paulo" (First of São Paulo), the first school of samba de São Paulo. The official competitions of the samba schools in São Paulo only started in 1950 with the victory of Lavapés, but before that there were other minor tournaments at the municipal and state levels. In the early 1960s some organized soccer support fan groups, like the Vai-Vai (Go-Go) and the Camisa Verde e Branco (Green and White Jersey) became samba schools.

Due to the large number of schools, in 1952, the access league "Grupo de Acesso" was created in order to allow new schools in and promote them to the "premier league" only if they abided by certain rules of excellence. That year, the parade of the access league (Group 2, current Group RJ-1) went seamlessly, but the parade of the main group (Group 1, currently the Special Group) was carried out under heavy rain. The judging results were canceled and all schools belonging to the access league were promoted to the "premier league".

In 1953 UGESB and FBES in AESCRJ, merged as LIESA, an association of samba schools from the premier league which became known in Portuguese as Grupo Especial. In 2008, LESGA was created, representing schools from the access league. LIESA inspired the creation of similar bodies in other cities, such as LIGA-SP.

In 1984, Rio de Janeiro governor Leonel Brizola dedicated the Sambadrome, a special space for the parading of samba schools. Years later, in São Paulo, Mayor Luiza Erundina did the same, creating the Anhembi Sambadrome.

Today, many other cities throughout the country also have their Sambadromes, including Manaus and in 1993 its parade was broadcast for the first time.

== Characterization ==
Natural associations are almost always local, largely from poor communities or the suburbs, forming samba schools that usually represent in a district, sub-district or set of districts. A parade which usually has local character, whereas the main schools of the city gather to compete among themselves for the best of the year. In this show, conducted over two nights, they are evaluated by a committee of judges chosen in advance by their leaders or by the representative.

The judges consider each of the judging categories, giving points to each. On the day that the results are announced, the final assessment of the panel can be affected by certain penalties for breaking certain rules, such as the requirement to parade within specific time limits, parading with the minimum components, and avoiding total nudity.

== Parade ==
In major cities, the parade of each samba school currently takes about an hour, with some variations according to the rules imposed by the organization of the carnival in the city. For each of the Special Group in the city of Rio de Janeiro, the parade has a maximum time of one hour and twenty minutes, while in São Paulo is the maximum of 1 hour and five minutes. Along the parade ground, stop watches mark the period of time.

=== Concentration area ===
This is the time and place occupied by the schools while waiting their turn to enter the parade in the Sambadrome.

After the end of a parade, the narrator announces the school next to perform, and the sounds from the microphone, restricted to only a part of sambadrome, are released so that people can hear in the bleachers. Then the opening cries are heard, after which the parade itself begins, and the timer starts to run.

=== Requisites ===
Several elements are part of the characterization of the parade of the samba school, and some areas to which the jury should assign scores. Others, like the wing of Bahia, however, are not considered as items, but can cause loss of points for the body anyway, if not shown.

==== Front Commission ====
This is the first group of parade participants to perform, and consists of about ten to fifteen people who execute the choreography to introduce the theme. Apart from the Front Commission, there is no other rule regarding the order of the elements during the parade of samba schools.

Functioning as a sort of master of ceremonies of the show by welcoming the public and presenting the school, the front commission of the samba schools has undergone many changes over time. In its early years, it was formed by a group of men, the general directors of the college, who came in front of the school wearing their best clothes and welcomed the public. Sometimes they carried sticks in their hands, whose prime objective was "to defend the group against rivals".

The Portela samba school developed a more refined front commission, where its performers paraded with elegant clothes, even occasionally with tails and top hat, a model which soon came to be copied by other schools. That was the policy of its most illustrious member, Paulo da Portela, which meant that Sambistas should always go well dressed, in order to dispel the negative image of them held by the upper class. In the less formal blocos, predecessors of the schools, they had a reputation of being supporters of street fights and street riot.

==== Allegorical floats and props ====
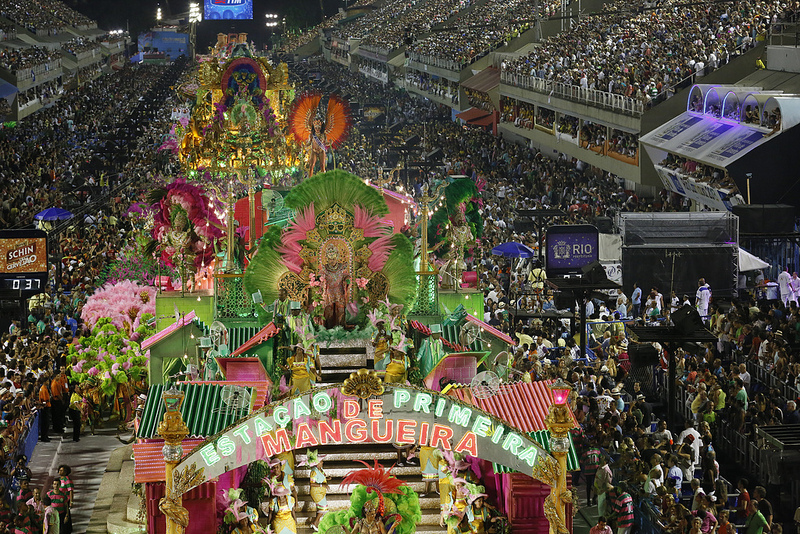
Allegorical floats of the Estação Primeira de Mangueira school during the carnival parade of 2013.

One of the judging categories is the allegorical floats, filled with sculptures of wood, plastic, Styrofoam and other materials, decorated to represent the elements of the plot. In the Special Group performance of Rio de Janeiro, floats currently may not exceed eight meters and fifty centimeters wide and nine meters and eighty centimeters tall.

The first float of the parade often includes a stylised depiction of the school. Some schools, such as Portela for example, always bring their winged eagle symbol, regardless of plot. The greatest floats can reach up to 13 meters high and 60 meters in length, which sometimes affects their entry into the parade ground. These floats are propelled by hand with people who are below or behind the float. No float can be moved by an engine (during the 1990s, it was to prevent the risk of fire.

==== Progression and harmony ====
The progression or evolution of the school's parade as it develops its story is of great importance to the judges. Anyone watching should have the impression that the school is a single body, a continuous row. There is no requirement that the components perform samba, but they must move with a degree of unison and good timing. Schools that suffer dramatic changes in its parade speed, parading sometimes very quickly, sometimes slowly, are usually penalized.

Schools where the participants do not sing the samba, or sing badly, may receive less points.

==== Plot-theme ("enredo") ====
As a feature of the parades, the plot, usually chosen some time after the previous carnival, will occupy the school for the following year. Meanwhile, from the main theme, a synopsis is drawn, which will guide the design and manufacture of costumes, floats and samba-song. Judges will decide whether the school explained the theme during the parade,.

==== Samba-song ====
Judges assess whether the samba has a good melody and lyrics with interesting features, musically rich, reflecting the theme, and without bias or errors of language. The samba of each school is chosen after an internal competition at the school, where Sambistas or groups create their sambas, based on the previously agreed theme. The competition takes place over several weekends, some entries are eliminated, until only there is a winning song which the school then adopts. In Rio de Janeiro, the competition usually takes place in August and is today livestreamed. In October, a CD of the Special Group is recorded with the chosen sambas from each school competing with a latter phyical and digital release, the latter on sites like Spotify, and currently, the CD release is accompanied by the social media release of the official MTVs and lyric videos of the songs selected.

Until 2007, in the Special Group schools of São Paulo, the samba song would be considered twice, once for lyrics and once for melody of music, with equal points for each.

==== Mestre-sala and Porta-Bandeira ====
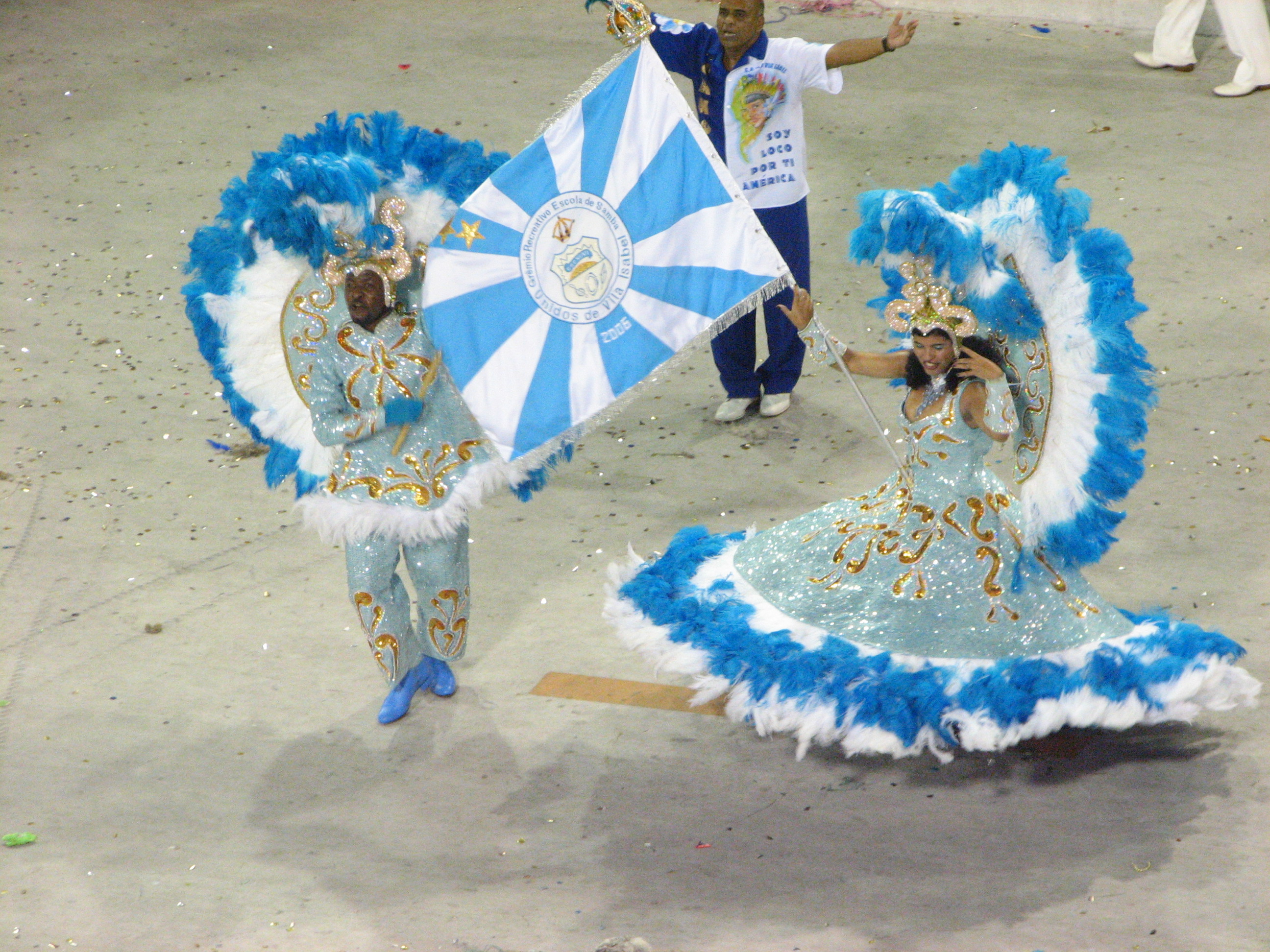
Mestre-sala and porta-bandeira from Unidos de Vila Isabel at the 2006 Carnival.

The mestre-sala (literally, "The Master of the Room") and porta-bandeira ("she who carries the flag") display the flag of the school to the audience. The porta-bandeira carries the flag, and the mestre-sala pays tribute and draws attention to both the flag and the porta-bandeira. Her dance is not a samba, but she spins and swirls her way ahead. The mestre-sala dances around her. All their moves are regulated in a set of rules, and at one point during the parade they are evaluated by the judges. The slightest mistake may result in their scores being lowered. For example: it is forbidden that the two turn their backs to each other at the same time, and errors such as the drop of a hat or other slips will result in lower scores. Their costumes are similar to the gala costumes typical of the eighteenth century, but "carnavalized", i.e. with an exaggerated amount of colors and decorations.

Currently, at least since the 1990s, the schools of the Special Group of Rio and São Paulo parade usually with three or four pairs of mestre-salas and porta-bandeira, but only the first is evaluated, the other being merely decorative, and optional. Normally, they are there to represent the school in some events when the main couple is unable to.

The mestre-sala seems to reflect the carnival dances of the nineteenth century, in which there was a professional organization responsible for the hall that was called "master of room" or "master-room." With respect to the porta-bandeira, the name was a natural adaptation of the old flag-bearer character, usually male, who carried the heavy banners of Brazilian carnival groups The visual aspect of the mestre-sala has also been compared to the Zé Pilintra of ethnic Afro-Brazilian traditions.

==== Drumming Section ====
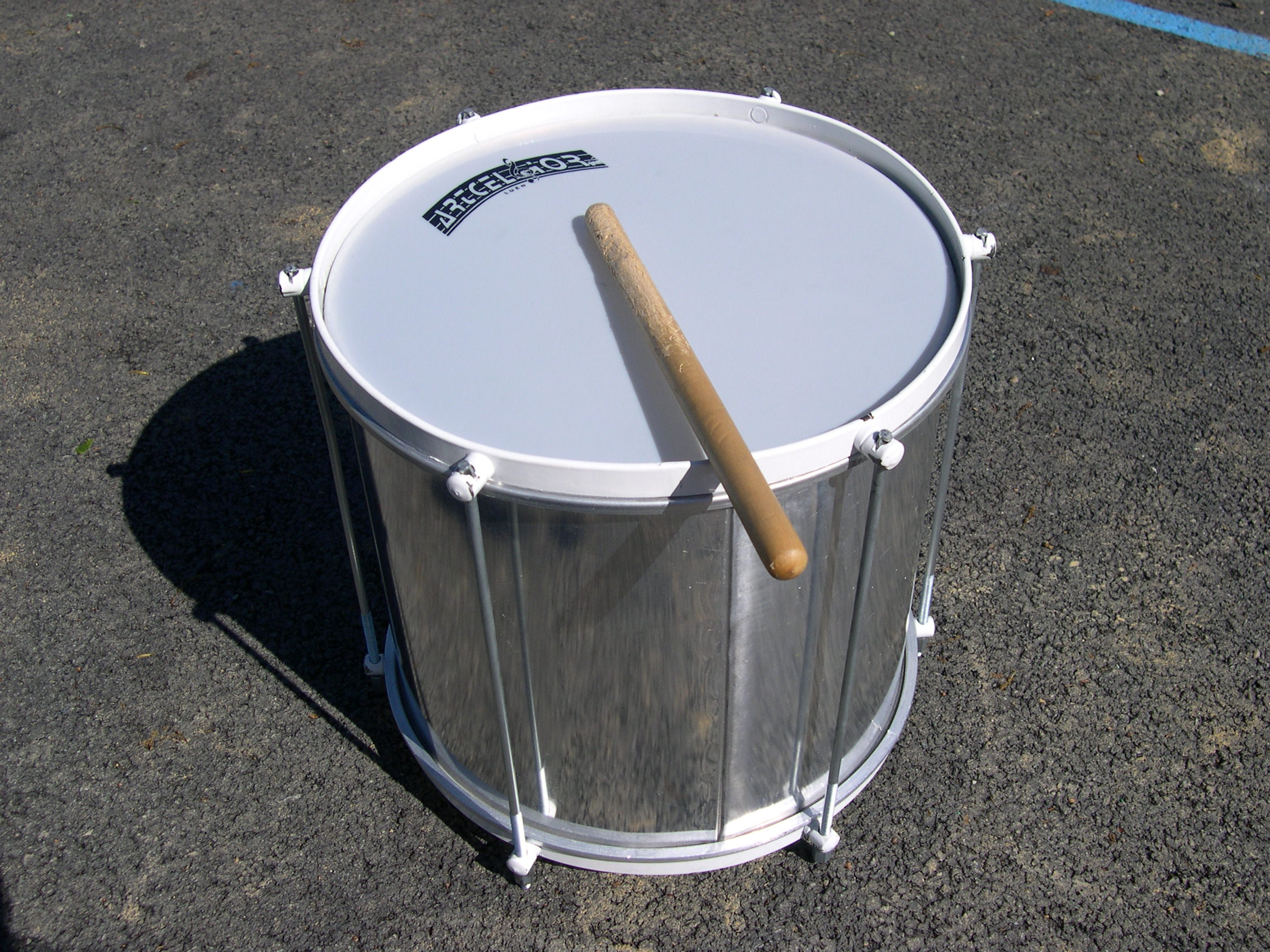
One of many instruments in a samba school bateria: the repique.

The drumming wing, or "bateria", is a kind of orchestra of percussion instruments. They accompany the singer and lead the pace of the parade. The faster and stronger the pace of the bateria, the faster members usually parade. Each school has, currently, an average 250 to 300 musicians. Every bateria is evaluated on "the regular maintenance and support of the cadence ... in accordance with the Samba Theme: the perfect combination of sounds emitted by various tools, and the creativity and versatility of the bateria."

The following instruments usually form part of a bateria of the samba school: Surdo de primera, surdo de segunda, surdo de terceira, surdo mor, snare drums (caixa de guerra), repinique, chocalho, tambourim, cuíca, agogô, reco-reco, and frigedeira. There are variations in composition, for example, the samba-school Mangueira, does not use the surdo de segunda, only surdo de primeira and another drum known as a surdo mor, while the samba-school Empire Serrano emphasizes the agogô.

In the 1960s came the "Paradinha" ("little stop") of Mestre André, a famous director of the Mocidade Independente de Padre Miguel. André was the creator of the musical effect in which the bateria suddenly stop playing during a parade, leaving only the cavaquinho (a small string instrument) and voice components for a moment. When the music returns, the effect is of surprise and excitement. The expected effect, considered beautiful by the critics, is also risky because it increases the chances that the samba song can mistakenly be taken up again at the wrong moment.

=== Other elements ===
==== Director of the Drums Section ====
As a whole orchestra, the percussionists of the samba school also has a conductor, also called master of bateria.

==== Queen of drums section and related ====
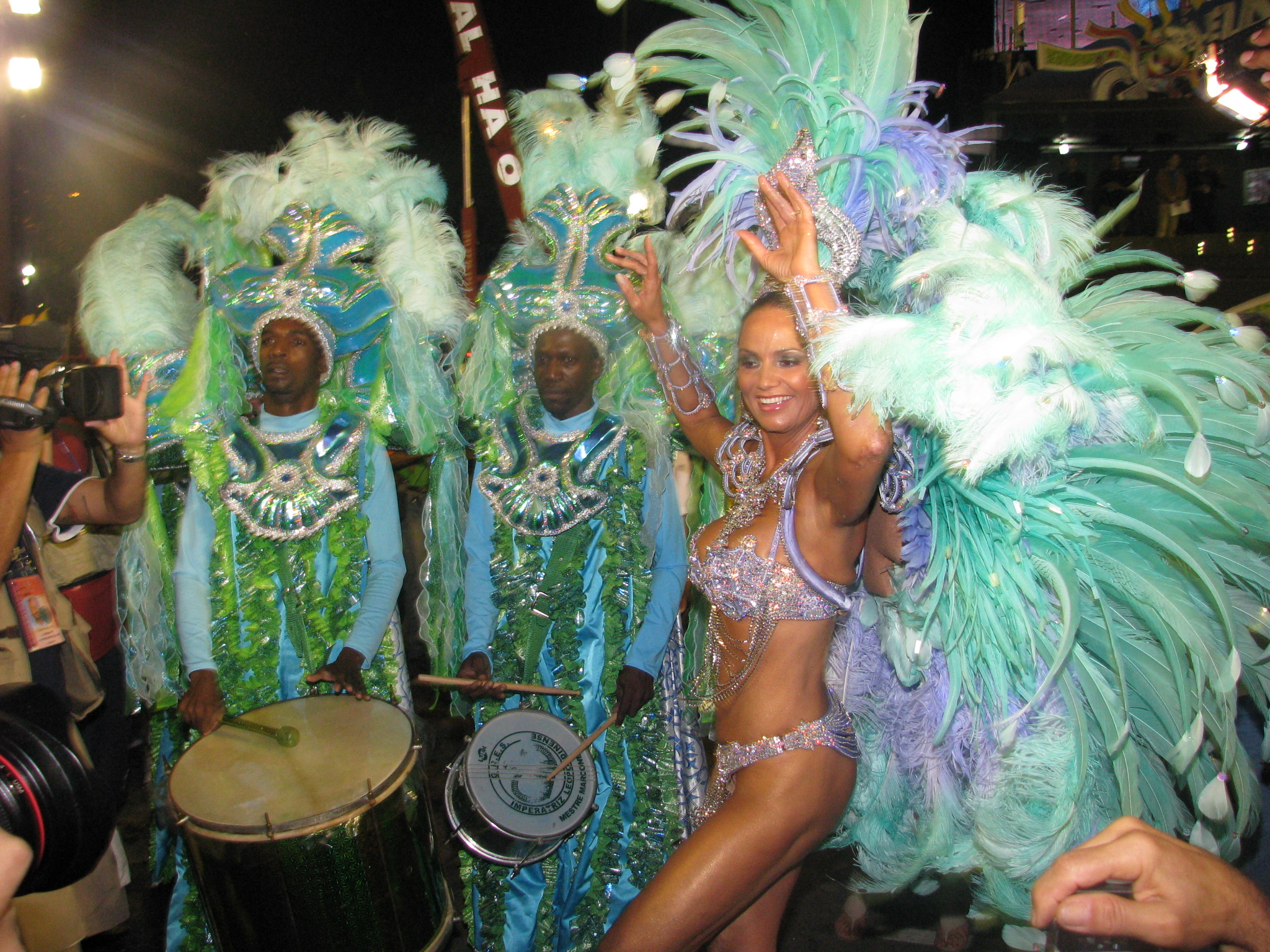
Luiza Brunet, queen of the drums section of Imperatriz Leopoldinense, in the 2008 carnival.

The queen of the drums section and related roles: godmother, muse, and princess are positions of honor occupied by distinguished members of the community and sometimes by celebrities. The queen of the drums section dances ahead of the drummers group and sometimes interacts with them.

The figure of the queen of the drums section appeared in the 1970s when the famous mulatto Adele Fatima led the Youth Independent Drums Section, an unprecedent fact, and gained popularity in the following decade. Today it is one of the most celebrated roles in samba schools. Monique Evans, in Mocidade, Luma de Oliveira, in Tradição and Soninha Capeta, in Beija-Flor, were some notable queens of drum sections. Some schools also introduced the figure of a King of the drums section.

The godmother of the drumming section is similar to the queen, and the two often get confused. Many schools use the two roles to pay tribute to more women. In the 1980s, many schools began to choose famous TV actresses instead of girls from the community, raising controversy in the media. In theory, the position of godmother should be offered to women of importance in the history of the school or in daily life, on a lifelong basis, which does not change every year, as the position of queen, but this is often not the case and the godmother only a queen with another name.

==== Ala das Baianas ====
The "ala das baianas" is considered one of the most important wings of a samba school parade, and preferably composed of ladies dressed in clothes that refer to old aunts of the first groups of Bahia samba of the early twentieth century. It is mandatory for all competition parades of samba schools, although not official. In the years 1940 to 1950, it was common for men to parade dressed in this way.

The traditional clothing of Bahia consists of torso, coat, cloth and skirt round the coast. However, often those watching the parades can see Bahian dress with the most unusual costumes, such as brides, statues of liberty, space beings, globe (pictured) or oil wells. These dresses may differ depending on the theme for the year of the school.

==== Old-guard ====
The old guard (in Portuguese "Velha Guarda") is a group of samba dancers older, often already quite old, often the founders of schools, employees and staff that no longer hold positions within the hierarchy of the party, but as a separate department, and occupy the Carnival parade in positions of honor, dressed in carnival costumes typical of samba, such zoot suits in school colors and Panama-style hats.

==== Singer ====
The singer, also known as the performer or puller is responsible for the professional performance of the samba-plot during the parade, and usually aided by a group of supporting singers. Using a microphone, and usually more powerful than the supporting singers, his voice stands out over the other members of the school, taking the lead on how fast the song is sung by the school's parade.

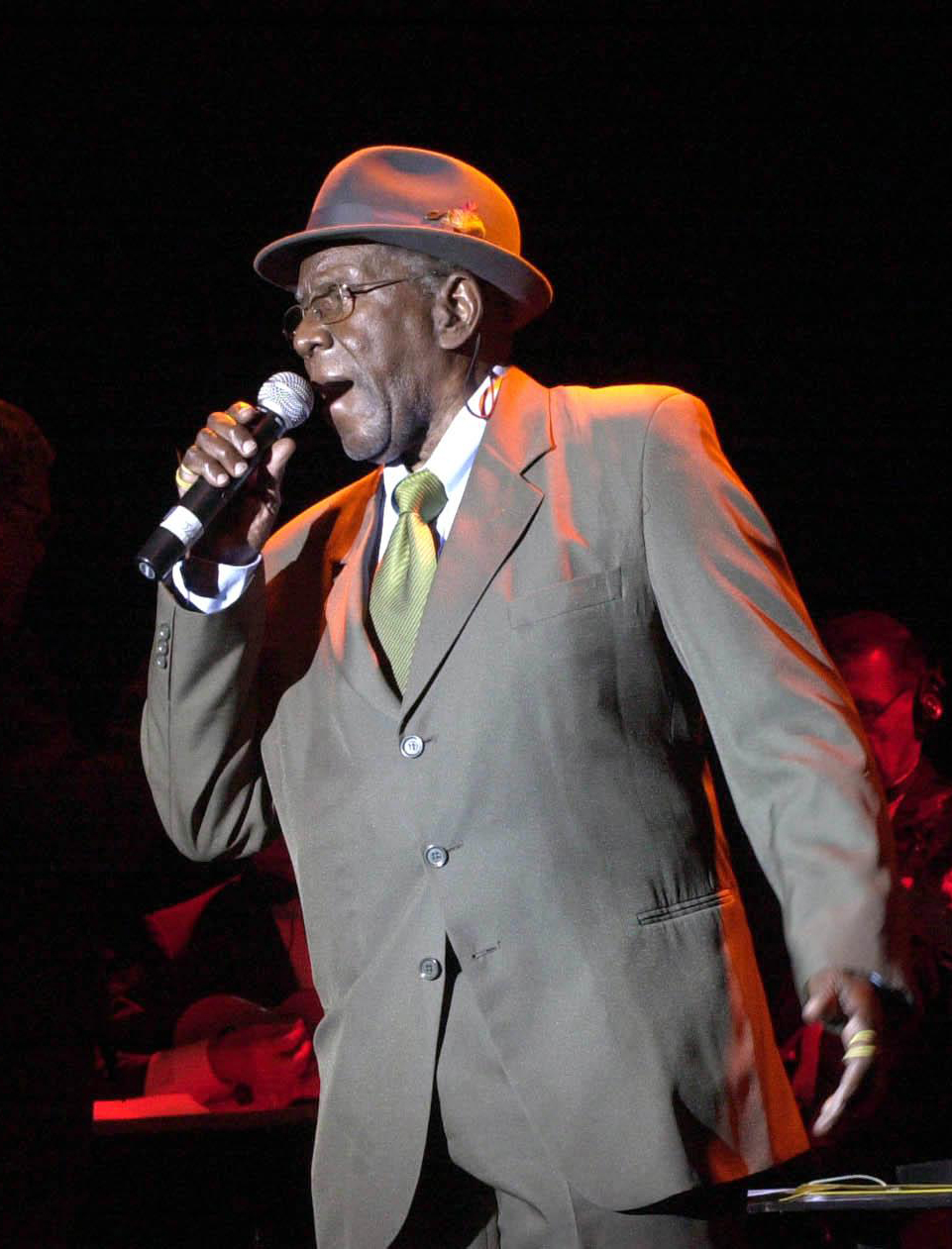
Jamelão (1913–2008), a Brazilian samba singer.

The samba during the parade should not be interpreted by one or just a few people, but sung by the entire school: the music should only be "pulled" (initiated) by the minority group. Moreover, many believe that the handle would be a special category of performer, able not only to interpret a samba, but also encourage and arouse the audience.

From the 1990s, Jamelão, the long time singer from the Mangueira school, criticized the traditional term, seeking to replace it with a new terminology: Interpreter/Singer of the Samba-Enredo. In the words of Jamelão, one who would handle "smoke pull, pull cart, pull-bag" (in original "puxa fuma fumo, puxa carro, puxa saco"; in Rio de Janeiro's giria, "smoke marijuana, steals vehicle, yes-man") which in his opinion, a derogatory term. From this, many commentators and TV stations began to replace the first by the second term, which however, still remains.

Another controversy that is still common for interpreters is the question whether or not it is unethical for the official interpreter at a school to participate in the internal dispute of their own college. Some schools prohibit this, but release their professionals to participate in tryouts for other schools.

==== Carnavalesco (Carnival Producer or production staff) ====
This is the professional responsible for design and development of the plot to be submitted by and for the school as well as the design, development and construction of floats and costumes related to the proposed plot. In some cases, the carnavalesco develops the plot from a topic proposed by the directorial team or director of the samba school. In others, he suggests the theme of an idea from its original. The carnavalesco is usually a single person, but the Beija-Flor school of Rio de Janeiro now use a team of carnavalescos. The carnavalescos may or may not be university-trained for the profession, and may even have a team of researchers working with them to develop the school's theme. Many have a strong carnaval connection or background in the visual arts, performing arts, theater or dance.

==== Dirigentes/Directorial staff ====
This is the name by which may be called the president, the president of honor and patron of the school. One can also use this to include carnival directors, producers and other crew members. A carnival director is the director of the samba school who is in charge of the guidelines and philosophy of their carnival college, taking part in the selection of members of various sectors, even sometimes the plot, also coordinating the shed or warehouse where the floats are made, the purchase of equipment, payments and the development of the entire project of the school. It is not uncommon for Carnival directors to be paid professionals. Many also include the executive directors of the samba school, such as Laíla, of Beija-Flor.

== Carnival parade results ==
The results of the carnival competition are announced on the afternoon of Ash Wednesday in Rio, and on the afternoon of Shrove Tuesday in São Paulo. In both cities, there is a results presentation event where long lines are set up in the Sambódromo site. Tents are set up where the representatives of each samba school will annotate the scores as they are being released to the public, making the calculations. The chairman of the league speaks his final remarks about the carnival that year, reads the possible loss of points given to each samba school, and then reads the scores per school block.

The bleachers are open to the public, and the charge for entry is typically one kilogram of non-perishable food. Both in Rio and in São Paulo the event is transmitted live on television; television cameras in real time are used to broadcast the movement of blocks within the main school, the title favorite, where members and fans that cannot be there at the Sambódromo gather at the school campus to watch the proceedings via wide screens.

The scores typically range between 7 and 10 in Rio and São Paulo, and the points are further subdivided into decimal fractions in Rio and 25 hundredths in São Paulo. In Rio, all the marks given by all the jurors are valid, while in São Paulo the lowest score for each category is eliminated .

The scoring system has changed several times in both cities. In Rio and São Paulo, until the early 2000s, the division was more than half a point, and there have been years when there was also the elimination of major score given to each school, the very removal of the lower scores have also and has ceased to be part of the rule several times. In Rio de Janeiro, the lowest score in the same period was 5, and note the 0 (zero) allowed only in case of failure of the plot.

Often the scores given by the jurors are questioned, both by fans, as by members of schools who are harmed, causing many complaints after the show. Some results that have been controversial end up in court. In the case of the school of samba Acadêmicos de Santa Cruz that the dark parade carnival in 1991 because of a blackout and was not evaluated. However, in recent years in São Paulo there has been a climate of acceptance of the outcome, when in 2007 the president of Tobias Go-Go Live congratulated the Youth Alegre, being greeted by members of the Lemon school the following year.

== Champions Parade ==
Starting in the 1980s, the Parade of Champions is an event during which the top 5 schools of the Special Group and the winner of Group A repeat their parades in the Sambadrome. It takes place on the Saturday following Ash Wednesday. This parade has no competitive character; it is a celebratory festival to crown the year's best schools that gives the parade revellers (AKA foliões) a chance to be more carefree and enjoy themselves.

In São Paulo, the parade of champions is the night between Friday night and after the carnival on Saturday. The parade in Rio begins Saturday night and continues into the early hours of Sunday. In Rio de Janeiro, until the 1990s, participating in the parade of champions also promoted the schools of the Group to access, something that remains in São Paulo. Tradition was considered also in the participation of society Rio carnival hundred Italian Carnevale D'Italia. In 1985, an event that is considered integral to the history of Nene de Vila Matilde, was when the school was invited to join the parade of champions Rio, in an era where the Carnival Paulistano was much less popular and did not have a proper space.

The parade of champions is not always purely celebratory: many schools have taken the day to protest against the outcome of the championship. Placing fifth in 2005, the Vai-Vai had no parade that year. The Viradouro already in the champions parade on Saturday with members using the clown nose and banners of protest.

== See also ==
- Torcida Jovem
- Bateria
- Krewe
- LIESA
- LigaSP

== In popular culture ==
=== Cinema ===
- The film Trinta (2013), by Paulo Machline, traces the life of the carnavalesco (parade designer) Joãosinho Trinta.
- The film Jonas (2016), by Lô Politi, tells the story of a young man who kidnaps the daughter of his mother's boss, with whom he has always been in love, and holds her captive in a whale-shaped float in São Paulo.

=== Literature ===
- The children's book A Rainha de Bateria (2009), by Martinho da Vila, tells the story of a child who lives near the headquarters of a samba school and becomes queen of the rhythm section. (rainha da bateria).
- The novel Desde que o samba é samba (2012), by Paulo Lins, recounts the creation of the first samba school in the 1920s.
- The plot of the novel O Grande Dia (2024), by the Swiss writer Pierre Cormon, revolves around a parade by the imaginary samba school Unidos de Madureira.
