= Pai-de-santo =

Brazilian priest

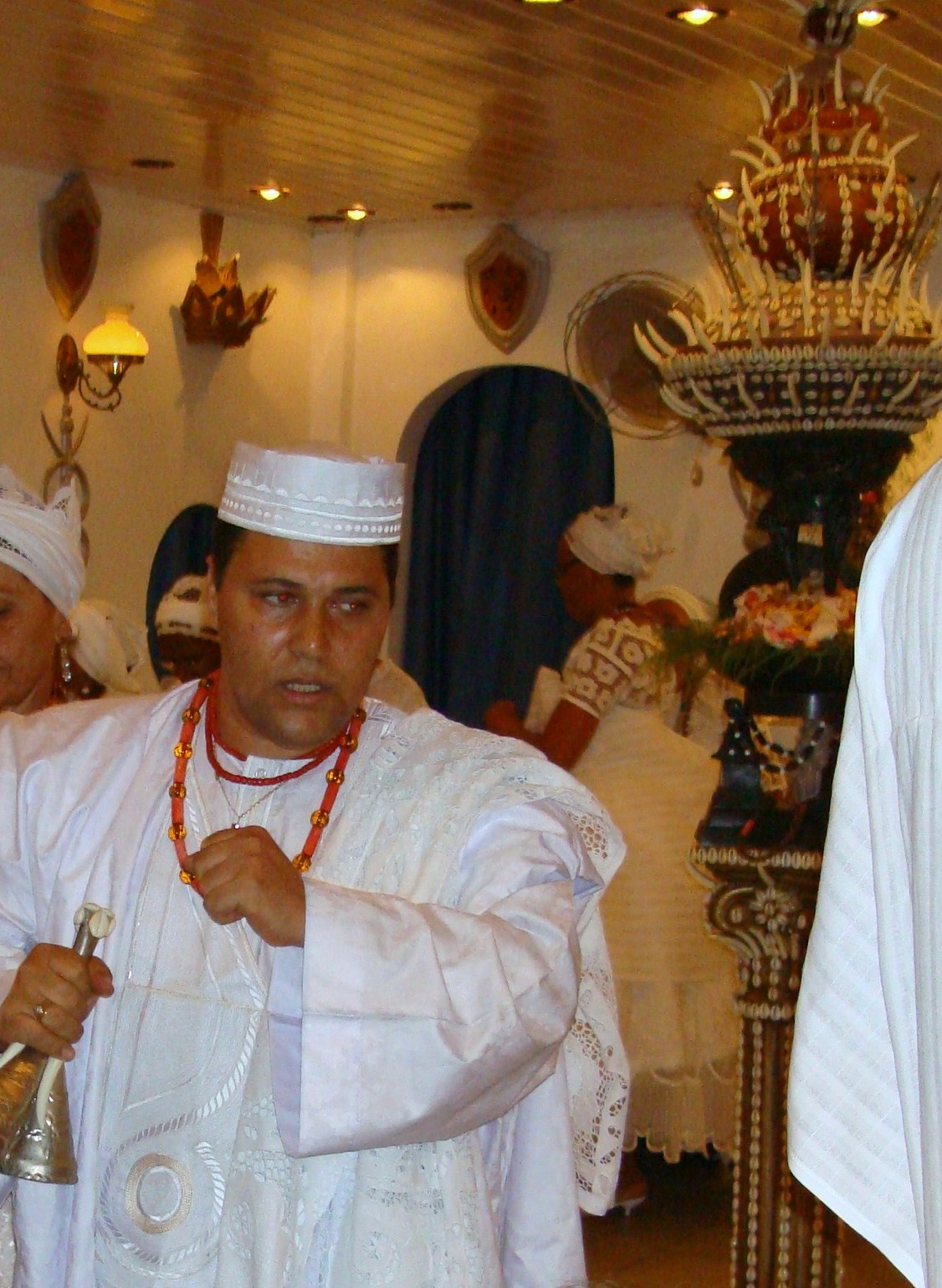
Pai-de-santo Antonio de Obaluaye in a Candomblé ceremony

A pai-de-santo or pai de santo (Portuguese pronunciation: [ˈpaj d(ʒi) ˈsɐ̃tu], plural pais de santo [ˈpajs d(ʒi) ˈsɐ̃tu]) is a male priest of Candomblé, Umbanda and Quimbanda, the Afro-Brazilian religions. In Portuguese, those words translate as "saint's father", which is a calque (word-to-word translative adaptation) of the Yoruba babalorisha, a title given to the leaders of the African religions that originated the Brazilian ones. Baba means "father", and the contraction l'orisha means "of orisha". As a product of religious syncretism, the word orisha (meaning "elevated or ancestral spirit") was adapted into Portuguese as "saint".

In the Afro-Brazilian religions, (of both sexes) are seen as the owners of tradition, knowledge and culture; it is their responsibility to pass those on to the new generations, because there is no religious text to use for the record.

== See also ==
- Babalawo
- Mãe-de-santo
