= Estácio, Rio de Janeiro =

Estácio
- Neighborhood
- Location in Rio de Janeiro Estácio (Brazil)
- Coordinates: 22°55′01″S 43°12′11″W
- Country: Brazil
- State: Rio de Janeiro (RJ)
- Municipality/City: Rio de Janeiro
- Zone: Centro

Population (2010)
  - Total: 17,189

Estácio is a neighborhood in Rio de Janeiro, Brazil.

The neighborhood was named after Estácio de Sá, the founder of Rio de Janeiro. The place where samba began.
