= Ismael Silva (musician) =

Brazilian musician (1905–1978)

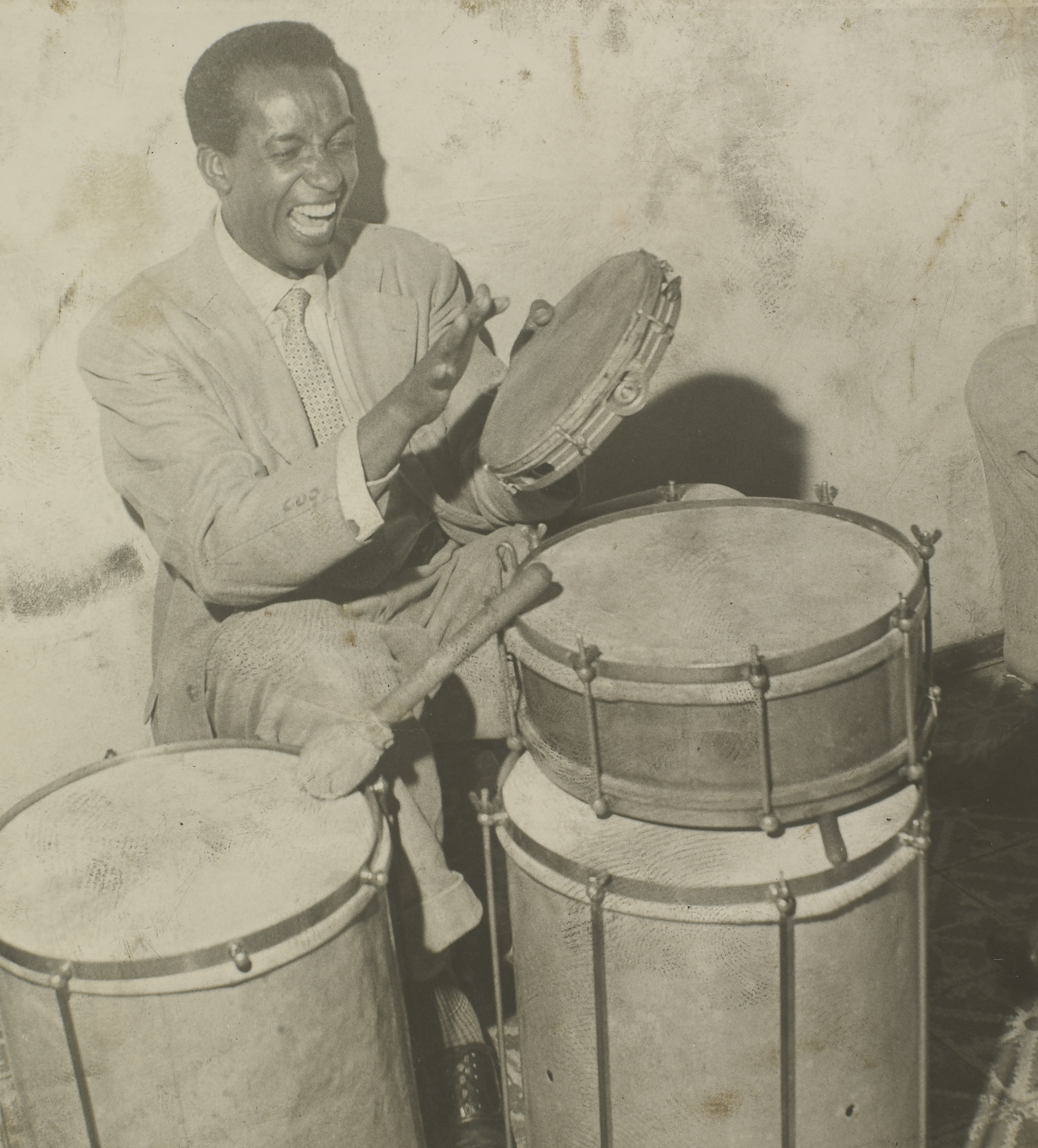
- Born: September 14, 1905
- Died: March 14, 1978 (aged 72)
- Occupation: Musician

Milton de Oliveira Ismael Silva (September 14, 1905 – March 14, 1978), known as Ismael Silva, was a Brazilian samba musician. In 1925, he had his first recorded his samba. His best-known compositions were Me faz carinhos, Se você jurar, Antonico, Para me livrar do mal, Novo amor, Ao romper da aurora, Tristezas não pagam dívidas, Me diga o teu nome, among others.

Imprisoned at one point for five years, but getting out after two for good behavior, he became reclusive upon release and only returned to the Carioca scene in the fifties. It is known that, during that period, he went through tremendous financial difficulties. One of his last concerts was in 1973, produced by Ricardo Cravo Albim. He died in 1978 of a heart attack as a result of complications arising after surgery to treat a varicose ulcer he had on one leg.
