= Partido alto =

Music genre and type of dance

- Other names: Samba de partido alto
- Stylistic origins: Samba, polka, maxixe, lundu
- Cultural origins: Early 20th century, Rio de Janeiro

Partido Alto refers to a type of samba with a number of particularities. In the world of samba subgenres and in samba reunions, partido alto songs (informally called partidos) can represent a time for improvisation and (humorous or not) disputes, besides a stronger singalong opportunity for the participants.

Partido Alto is also the name of a particular rhythm that is derived from the above-mentioned style of samba (especially in a jazz context). The rhythm is often played in samba, and is also the basis for the Partido Alto groove, in which more or all of the instruments accent this rhythm.

== Characteristics ==
Regarding structure, Partido Alto differentiates itself from common samba in that it is usually divided in two main parts. One is the usually static refrain (refrão), which is sung by a choral, which often means everyone present in a samba performance. The other part is called the verses and is often soloed by one or more participants. There can frequently be two or more versers (versadores), and that usually means that they will be competing in some way, be it humorous or not.

Partido Alto's harmony is traditionally in a major key, which is often understood as a more joyous type of harmony, matching the genre's somewhat euphoric nature. Percussivelly, it presents a peculiar pandeiro beat, with strong use of a violent, dry snap created by hitting the center of the head with the palm of the hand; thus nylon-skinned pandeiros are more common here than in others genres, although Partido Alto uses organic-skins just as much. The name of the genre can, among other meanings, be understood as a reference to this percussive property; one of the possible literal translations would be "broken high", which could be thought of as "highly broken".

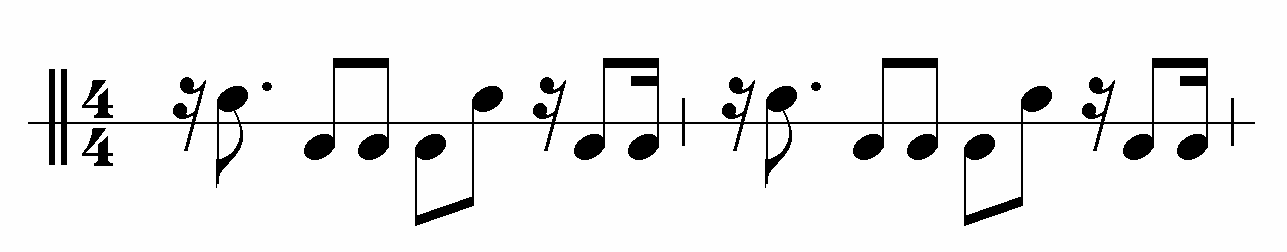

== History ==
Partido Alto has its origins in the religious parties in rural communities where jongo was played, a type of music very rooted in Africa, accompanied by drums called candongueiros, angumativas and caxambus. It has been present in samba from the beginning; there are songs which are considered partidos dated from the 1930s. There's a traditional jongo nucleus around the samba school Império Serrano in Rio de Janeiro, which is active to this day. Thus it is no wonder that a very important artist in the genre, Aniceto do Império, came from there. He and Nilton Campolino released very late in their career, in 1977, their first record, when Aniceto counted 65 years. Other precursors of the music include Candeia and the legendary Geraldo Babão from the samba-schools Portela and Salgueiro.

Further famous partido alto musicians include Clementina de Jesus, Jovelina Pérola Negra, Xangô da Mangueira, Bezerra da Silva and Candeia; these can be thought of as the genre's roots. More recent musicians of the such as Grupo Fundo de Quintal, Zeca Pagodinho, Almir Guineto, Trio Calafrio and Arlindo Cruz are, among other things, exponents of the genre, although they don't restrain themselves to it.

Examples of prominent songs which can classified as partido alto are the famous "Não Vem (Assim Não Dá)", from the classic record "Quatro Grandes do Samba", where Candeia, Elton Medeiros, Nelson Cavaquinho and Guilherme de Brito share the verses, and "Perdoa", by Paulinho da Viola, where he and Elton Medeiros share the verses.

Partido Alto has been documented in the film of the same name by Leon Hirszman.

== Literature ==
- Nei Lopes: Partido-Alto: Samba de Bamba, Pallas, 264p., 2005
