= Partido Alto (documentary) =

Brazilian documentary

- Directed by: Leon Hirszman
- Written by: Leon Hirszman
- Produced by: Leon Hirszman
- Starring: Candeia; Manacéia; Paulinho da Viola; Argemiro da Portela; Casquinha; Wilson Moreira
- Cinematography: Lucio Kodato
- Edited by: Lucio Kodato
- Music by: Candeia; Manacéia; Paulinho da Viola; Argemiro da Portela; Casquinha; Wilson Moreira
- Distributed by: Embrafilme
- Release date: 1982
- Running time: 22 minutes
- Country: Brazil
- Language: Brazilian Portuguese

Partido Alto is a 1982 Brazilian short documentary film directed by Leon Hirszman. Produced by now-defunct Brazilian state film production company Embrafilme, the film details the history of Partido alto, a musical subgenre of Samba focused on the drumming style of Bahia.

The documentary presents partido alto as a blend of freestyle rapping, rhyming and improvisational chorus.
