= Teresa Cristina (singer) =

Brazilian singer

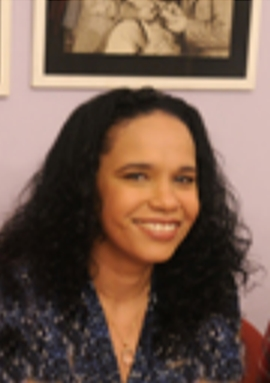
- Teresa Cristina in 2011

Background information
- Born: Teresa Cristina Macedo Gomes; February 28, 1968 (age 58); Rio de Janeiro, Brazil
- Genres: MPB; Samba
- Occupation: Singer
- Instrument: Vocal

Teresa Cristina Macedo Gomes (born February 28, 1968) is a Brazilian singer born in Rio de Janeiro. Her musical style is MPB and Samba.

== Career ==
According to Teresa, she was first exposed to the music of Candeia at the age of 7 through her father, but at that time found the music outdated. During her childhood and adolescence, Teresa says, she was mostly influenced by foreign singers, such as Donna Summer, Barry White, Van Halen and Iron Maiden. At the age of 25, a friend from university gave her a CD of Candeia, at which point she changed her mind about Candeia's musical style.

In 1995, Teresa took part in the A Cria project in the Gavea Planetarium in Rio de Janeiro. Following that project, she was invited by Brazilian poet and songwriter Chacal to take part in the CEP 20.000 project. She later performed in the Casa da Mãe Joana, after being promoted by Brazilian singer and composer Wilson Moreira.

At the beginning of her career, Teresa performed mostly in bars in Rio de Janeiro, and especially in the Madureira neighborhood, singing sambas of Jair do Cavaquinho, Monarco and Argemiro da Portela, among others.

In 1998 she started performing in the Bar Semente, in Lapa, where she was a leading figure in reviving the musical heritage of the neighborhood. The band which still accompanies Teresa was formed in that bar: Teresa Cristina e Grupo Semente. The group's lead guitarist is João Callado, grandson of Brazilian writer Antonio Callado and son of artist Tessy Callado.

In 2012, she released a tribute album to the music of Roberto Carlos with the band Os Outros.

In 2016 she released Teresa Cristina Canta Cartola and in 2018, Teresa Cristina canta Noel.

In March 2020, Teresa did a live show on her Instagram page for her fans who were in quarantine due to COVID-19. The events are usually centered on an interpreter or composer, whose work songs are played during the event. Some of those honored by Teresa Cristina have been Zeca Pagodinho, Zé Keti, Arlindo Cruz, Geraldo Pereira, Chico Buarque. Teresa also brings, in an intimate atmosphere, discussions about politics, family, and relationships.

She was awarded by the Associação Paulista de Críticos de Arte as the 2020 artist of the year. In March 2021, she started presenting Botequim da Teresa on the UOL portal.

== Media ==
- Samba on your Feet, 2005
