= Candeia =

Brazilian singer, composer, and musician

- Candeia (right) with Cartola
- Born: Antônio Candeia Filho; 17 August 1935; Rio de Janeiro, Brazil
- Died: 16 November 1978 (aged 43); Rio de Janeiro, Brazil
- Occupations: singer; songwriter; musician; police officer
- Musical career
- Genres: Samba
- Instruments: Vocals; guitar; drums
- Label: Warner Records

Antônio Candeia Filho better known as Candeia (August 17, 1935 – November 16, 1978) was a Brazilian samba singer, songwriter, and musician.

== Early life ==
Born in Rio de Janeiro to Antonio Candeio and Dona Maria, Antonio was a renowned flautist in samba bands and samba schools through the 1930s. His childhood home in Oswaldo Cruz, Rio de Janeiro was a frequent meeting place for first-generation samba artists including Paulo da Portela, Joao da Gente, Guitar Dina, Claudionor Cruz, Cumpadi Cambé, Zé da Fome and Luperce. These meetings resulted in the establishment of a carnival block which eventually evolved into the Portela (samba school). From age 6, Candeia attended these meetings and later participated musically. In his youth, he learned guitar and ukulele before later joining the Portela school.

== Career ==
In 1953, Candeia composed his first samba, "Seis datas magnas", with Altair Marinho. The samba received the highest score on record by the Rio de Janeiro Carnival jury in 1953. Following this Candeia composed four other award-winning samba singles for the Portela school including "Festas juninas em fevereiro" (1955) and "Legados de Dom João VI" (1957) with Waldir 59 as well as "Rio, capital eterna do samba" and "Histórias e tradições do Rio quatrocentão".

In the early 1960s, Candeia joined the Rio de Janeiro Civil Police, assuming the position of investigator. During this time he continued composing sambas, and directed the Samba Messengers alongside Picolino and Cone, releasing an LP in 1964.

His career as a police officer ended tragically on December 13, 1965, when he was shot five times during a traffic stop by the driver of the suspect vehicle. One of the bullets lodged in his spinal cord and left him with no movement in his legs. With this paralysis, he was forced to retire from active duty. During this time, Candeia devoted himself exclusively to samba. According to people close to him, he became more sensitive, balanced and free during this time, which changed the character of his music. During this time he reached lyrical maturity, with his lyrics focusing on his disabled condition and his love of samba composing and singing giving him the will to live.

In 1970, he released his first album following his injury on the label Record Team. The LP Candeia contained twelve songs including the popular title "Dia de graça". The following year, his second LP was released, titled "Raiz" and included the song "De qualquer maneira", with lyrics creating a figurative image of Candeia's wheelchair as a king's throne.

In 1975, Candeia completed his third solo LP, "Samba de roda", released by Tapecar. Also that year, he participated in the recording of the LP "Partido em 5", the first in a three-volume series dedicated to Partido Alto, a style for which Candeia is most widely renowned. Candeia was one of the characters featured in the Partido Alto (documentary) by Leon Hirszman about the samba sub-genre of the same name. Later that year, Candeia also released a critical manifesto on the direction of both the Portela school, as well as Carnival on the whole. In it, he criticised the overly showy components of the Carnival planning, which he saw as losing sight of the true purpose of samba, participation of components and external position. In spite of the harsh tone, Portela responded with clear proposals to make it clear that it was not losing sight of its initial goals. Despite this, the elements of the response from Portela were never discussed by the school board of Oswaldo Cruz and were not instituted. In response, Candeia and other samba artists and composers founded the Black Art Recreational Guild Quilombo Samba School, which would not participate in Carnival and emphasized Afro-Brazilian cultural identity.

In 1977, Candeia participated in the album "Quatro Grandes do Samba", which also featured Nelson Cavaquinho, Guilherme de Brito and Elton Medeiros. That year, he also signed with the American label WEA, which resulted in criticism that Candeia was no longer in touch with Brazilian audiences. On Warner Records, he released "Luz da inspiração", in which Candeia reflects on the cultural identity of black Brazilians after abolition. Later that year, he began to write the book "Escola de Samba: A árvore que esqueceu a raiz". Candeia intended to write the book with Paulinho da Viola but due to the singer's lack of time the work was written with Isnard de Araújo, due to his participation in the creation of the Portela Historical Museum.

=== Decline and death ===
With kidney problems from his paralysis, Candeia was admitted to the hospital but refused to continue treatment, claiming he had no time. In 1978, "Escola de Samba: A árvore que esqueceu a raiz" was finally released. He was also able to finalize the recording of "Axé - Gente amiga do samba", his fifth and final album, considered one of the most important albums in Samba's history. Candeia did not live to see his book published. On November 14, 1978, that year, he had an acute kidney issue and he fell into a coma. Candeia was admitted to the Cardoso Fontes Hospital in Jacarepaguá. Candeia died two days later in the morning from a kidney infection.

== Discography ==
=== Studio albums ===
Albums
Year	Title	Medium	Record label
1970	Candeia		Equipe
1971	Raiz	LP	Equipe
1975	Samba de roda		Tapecar
1977	Luz da inspiração		WEA
1978	Axé - Gente amiga do samba		WEA

=== Collaborations ===
Albums
Year	Title	Medium	Record label
1964	Mensageiros do Samba		Philips
1975	Partido em 5 Volume 1		Tapecar
1975	Partido em 5 Volume 2		Tapecar
1977	Quatro Grandes do Samba		RCA Victor

== See also ==
- GRES Portela
- GRANES Quilombo
