= Portela (samba school) =

Samba school in Rio de Janeiro, Brazil

- Full name: Grêmio Recreativo Escola de Samba Portela
- Foundation: 11 April 1923; 103 years ago
- Colors
- Symbol: Eagle with open wings
- Location: Madureira; Oswaldo Cruz
- President: Luis Carlos Magalhães
- Honorary president: Monarco
Carnival staff
- Carnival producer: Renato Lage; Márcia Lage
- Carnival singer: Gilsinho
- Carnival director: Fábio Pavão; Claudinho Portela; Marco Aurélio Fernandes; Júnior Schall; Júnior Escafura
- Harmony director: Chopp; Jeronymo da Portela; Leonardo Brandão; Nilce Fran; Márcio Emerson; Jorge Barbosa; Sérvolo Jorge; Valter Moura
- Mestre-sala and Porta-Bandeira: Marlon Lamar and Lucinha Nobre
- Choreography: Carlinhos de Jesus

2020 presentation
- Title: Guajupiá, terra sem males (Guajupiá, land without evil)
- Motif: Tupinambá
- Presentation order: 7th school on Sunday
- Result: 7th

Website
- gresportela.com.br

The Grêmio Recreativo Escola de Samba Portela or Portela for short, is a traditional samba school, founded in 1923, in Rio de Janeiro, Brazil. The school has the highest number of wins in the top-tier Rio parade, with 22 titles in total, including the 2017 Carnival parade.

== History ==
At the start of the 20th century, in Oswaldo Cruz, a neighborhood in the city of Rio de Janeiro forms a carnivalesque group of dancers called Quem Fala de Nós Come Mosca which literally translated as "Who talks about us eats flies". They are based in Dona Ester. A dissidence of this group of dancers (called "bloco" in Brazilian Portuguese) appears in 1922 and another bloco, the Baianinhas de Oswaldo Cruz (Baianas of Oswaldo Cruz) is created. Later, a dissidence of Baianas creates the Conjunto Carnavalesco Oswaldo Cruz (Carnaval Ensemble Oswaldo Cruz) on April 11, 1926. The founders are from Oswaldo Cruz however, Grêmio Recreativo Escola de Samba Portela is actually founded, on 412 Portela Road, in the neighborhood of Madureira.

After winning the contest between sambistas in 1929, performed in the house of Zé Espinguela, the bloco changes its name to Quem nos Faz é o Capricho (Who makes us is caprice). In 1931, when the samba schools are still being determined, the group changes its name again, this time to Vai como Pode (Go as you can). In 1935, the school is the champion of the first official parade of the city of Rio de Janeiro.

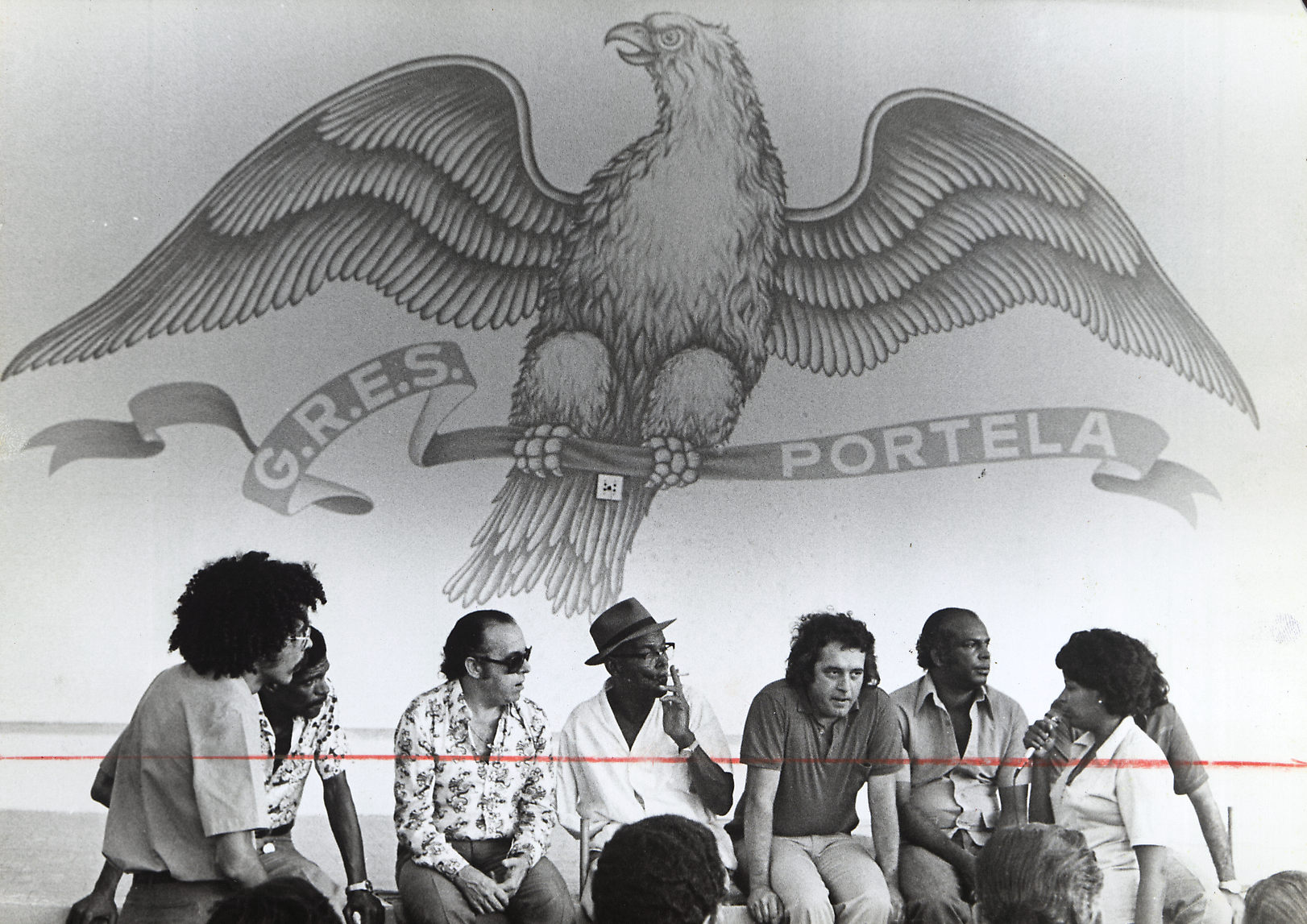
Inauguration of the new headquarters of the samba school Portela, 1972.

The name "Vai como Pode" is used until 1935, when, after the Carnaval, on March 1 of 1935, on the occasion of the renovation of the licence of the school in the police, the officer Dulcídio Gonçalves refused to renovate the license with this name, considering it as vulgar and not dignified for a samba school. The same officer suggested a new name, Grêmio Recreativo e Escola de Samba Portela, in homage to the street in Madureira where sambistas had gathered. The change pleased the community; many had already been referring to the school as the "folks from Portela". In 1939, the samba of Paulo da Portela, "Teste ao Samba" (Test for the samba), was considered the first samba-enredo. In the same year, Portela renovated things by bringing to the parade costumes totally framed to the enredo (plot).

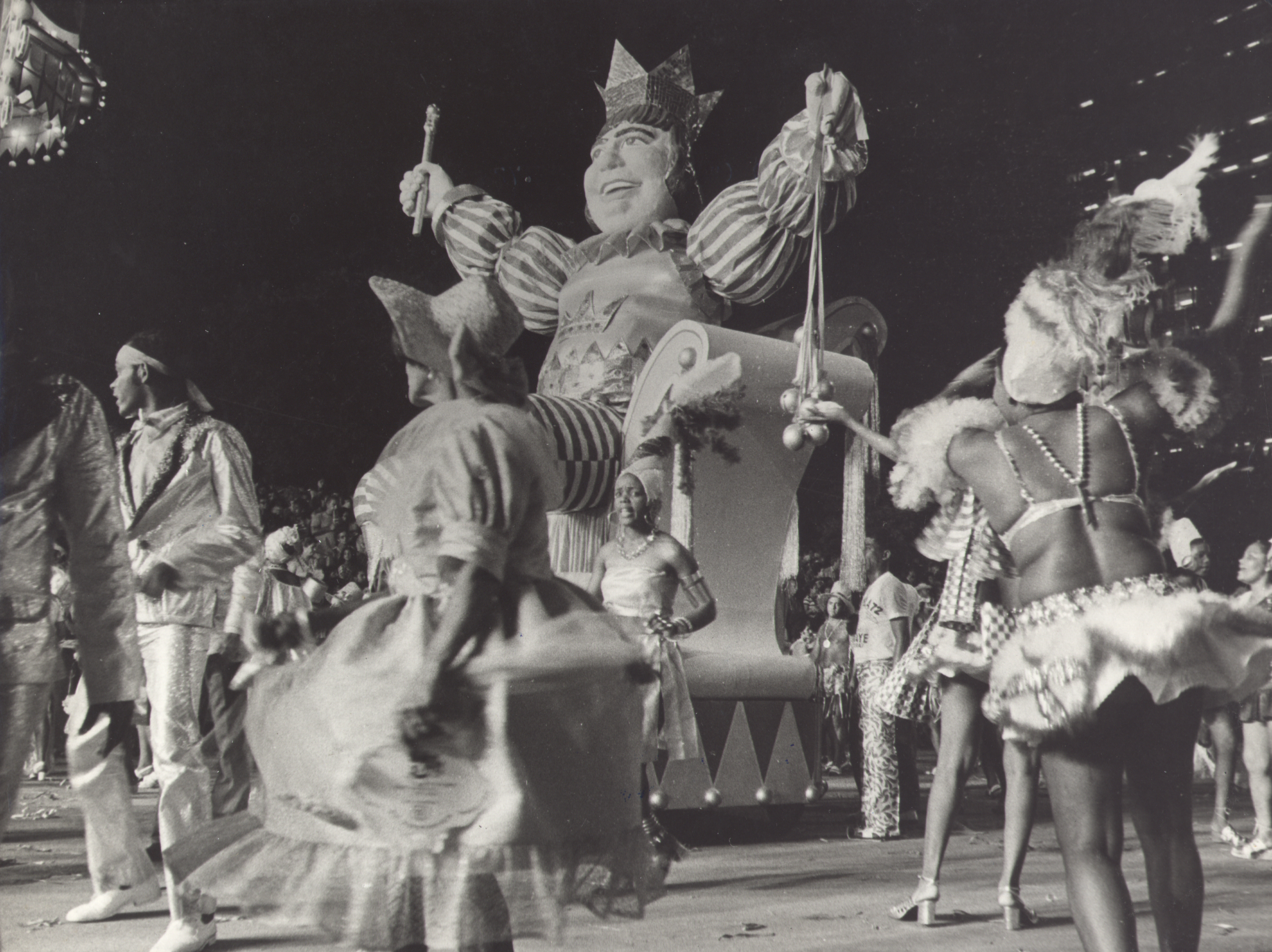
Portela, 1972.

In 1941, after a misunderstanding with the master of ceremonies Manuel Bambã, Paulo da Portela, the group, stopped parading. This occurred because Paulo, during a long period of time, argued that all of the components would parade correctly costumed, dressed with the colors of the school, however on the day of the parade he came back from a presentation in São Paulo, along with Heitor dos Prazeres and Cartola, and all of them were dressed in black and white. With no time to change costumes, they agreed to parade without changing clothes, together, in the samba schools of each one. However, in the turn to parade for Portela, Bambã did not authorize that the other two (Heitor and Cartola), not being from the school and not being correctly dressed, would parade. Actually Bambã had already had misunderstandings with Heitor, that once belonged to Portela. However, at that time, many portelenses (people who liked Portela) favoured Bambã, because they judged lack of coherency on the part of Paulo da Portela, that argued so much that they should parade with the colours of the school and then parade with black and white. After this, Paulo da Portela never paraded for his school.

In total, Portela conquered 22 titles of Carnaval, being the school with the largest number of titles to date. Some of the great Brazilian samba composers, such as Monarco, Zé Keti, Casquinha, Manacéa, Candeia, Aldir Blanc, Paulinho da Viola, João Nogueira, Noca da Portela, Colombo, among others, beyond being one of the most traditional samba schools of Brazil, worked for the school. Portela has an important participation in the cultural life of the city during the entire year, through the presentations of her Velha Guarda (a term for the oldest-ones (among a group of people)) and of her prizewinning bateria, among other things. The school's symbol is an eagle that in all the parades is seen in the abre alas (the car that opens the samba parade in Carnival) of the school. The Velha Guarda also released an album called Tudo Azul in 1999.

The bateria – called Tabajara do Samba (Tabajara of Samba) – is characterized mainly by the touch of the Surdo de Terceira invented by Sula in the 1940s, and the touch of the boxes with a peculiar frill. It is the most heavy bateria of the Carioca Carnival and counts on a big number of surdos (a type of drum) of First, Second, and Third. They were masters of GRES Portela: Master Betinho of the foundation in the 1960s, Master Cinco in the 1970s, Master Marçal in the 1980s, Mater Timbó in the 1990s, among others.

More than three decades later, Portela does not know how to win the carnival alone. From 1990, the school suffered many internal problems, that reflected on the parades and on the collocations of the parades. The best moment was in 1995 when the plot "Gosto que me enrosco" (I like when I twist myself) gave the vice-championship to the school of Madureira. In 2005, Portela stayed in 13th place, in the polemic parade where the school was prohibited to use their Velha Guarda. In 2006, the school recovered and stayed in 7th place, and in 2007 with the plot about the 2007 Pan American Games (held in Rio de Janeiro) fell one step, staying in 8th place.

An opposition movement formed that promoted carreatas and various events through the neighborhood of Madureira, and culminated in the election of May 19, 2013, where the plate "Portela Verdade", formed by Serginho Procópio, composer and member of the old-guard, the police Marcos Falcon besides Monarco as president of honor of the plate, was approved by winning, beat then President Nilo Figueiredo, who announced the result that ended with 154 votes for Serginho, 151 Nile and 8 null votes.

In 2014, the team was presented: the carnival producer Alexandre Louzada, carnival director Luiz Carlos Bruno, the singer Wantuir in master-room Diogo Jesus and the porta bandeira Danielle Birth the Ghislaine Cavalcanti, choreographer of the front. The plot of 2014 "Um Rio, de Mar a Mar. Do Valongo à Glória de São Sebastião" addressed how the carioca has adapted over the course of the transformations in the region between the waterfront and the Bairro da Glória (neighborhood in Rio de Janeiro), the blue and white made best parade in recent years, being considered one of the favorites. However they got the third place with 299 to 4 tenths of a champion. The result was celebrated by the board and twisted.

Already the plot was set for 2015, which was on the 450th anniversary of Rio de Janeiro. With the continuity of the carnival producer Alexandre Louzada and there is the acquisition of Wander Pires, who stood at the end of the theme song, being promoted to singer beside Wantuir, being one of its highlights the redemptive Eagle however with many ups and downs, the school managed the 5th placing. In 2016, the school brought the notorious Paulo Barros changing the direction of harmony.

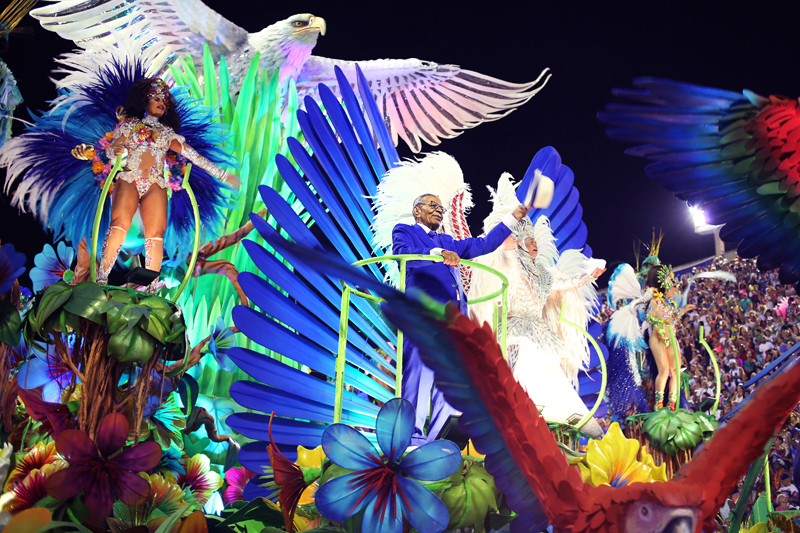
Portela, 2019. Photo: Guy Veloso

After the 2016 carnival Marcos Falcon won the vote of the school and became president of the school after serving as vice-president. But months after taking office, he resigned to run in the city council elections. As a result, the 2017 general championship, the first in 33 years, was the first school victory under historian Luis Carlos Magalhãe, who assumed the presidency in the spring of 2016.

== Classifications ==
| Year | Place | Division | Plot | Carnivals Producers |
| Year | Place | Division | Plot | Singers |
|---|---|---|---|---|
| 1932 | Vice Champion | Grupo Único | Carnaval moderno | Antônio Caetano |
| 1932 | Vice Champion | Grupo Único | Carnaval moderno | Paulo da Portela |
| 1933 | 4th place | Grupo Único | Voando para a glória | Antônio Caetano |
| 1933 | 4th place | Grupo Único | Voando para a glória | Paulo da Portela |
| 1934 | Vice Champion | Grupo Único | Antônio Caetano | Academia do Samba |
| 1934 | Vice Champion | Grupo Único | Antônio Caetano | Paulo da Portela |
| 1935 | Champion | UGESB | O Samba dominando o mundo | Antônio Caetano |
| 1935 | Champion | UGESB | O Samba dominando o mundo | Paulo da Portela |
| 1936 | 3rd place | UGESB | Paraded without defined plot | Paulo da Portela |
| 1936 | 3rd place | UGESB | Paraded without defined plot | Bibi; Chatim |
| 1937 | Vice Champion | UGESB | O Carnaval samba de Boaventura | Paulo da Portela |
| 1937 | Vice Champion | UGESB | O Carnaval samba de Boaventura | Bibi; Chatim |
| 1938 | There was no contest | | Democracia do Samba | Paulo da Portela |
| 1938 | There was no contest | | Democracia do Samba | Bibi; Chatim |
| 1939 | Champion | UGESB | Teste ao samba | Paulo da Portela |
| 1939 | Champion | UGESB | Teste ao samba | Bibi; Chatim |
| 1940 | 5th place | UGESB | Homenagem à Justiça | Paulo da Portela |
| 1940 | 5th place | UGESB | Homenagem à Justiça | Bibi; Chatim |
| 1941 | Champion | UGESB | Dez anos de glória | Paulo da Portela; Lino Manuel dos Reis |
| 1941 | Champion | UGESB | Dez anos de glória | Alvaiade; Chatim |
| 1942 | Champion | UGESB | A vida no samba | Lino Manuel dos Reis |
| 1942 | Champion | UGESB | A vida no samba | Alvaiade; Chatim |
| 1943 | Champion | UGESB | Carnaval de Guerra | Lino Manuel dos Reis |
| 1943 | Champion | UGESB | Carnaval de Guerra | Alvaiade; Chatim |
| 1944 | Champion | UGESB | Brasil glorioso | Lino Manuel dos Reis |
| 1944 | Champion | UGESB | Brasil glorioso | Ventura |
| 1945 | Champion | UGESB | Motivos patrióticos | Lino Manuel dos Reis |
| 1945 | Champion | UGESB | Motivos patrióticos | Ventura |
| 1946 | Champion | UGESB | Alvorada do novo mundo | Lino Manuel dos Reis |
| 1946 | Champion | UGESB | Alvorada do novo mundo | Ventura |
| 1947 | Champion | UGESB | Honra ao mérito | Lino Manuel dos Reis |
| 1947 | Champion | UGESB | Honra ao mérito | Alvaiade |
| 1948 | 3rd place | FBES | Princesa Isabel | Lino Manuel dos Reis |
| 1948 | 3rd place | FBES | Princesa Isabel | Manacéa |
| 1949 | Vice Champion | UGESB | Despertar do Gigante | Lino Manuel dos Reis |
| 1949 | Vice Champion | UGESB | Despertar do Gigante | Manacéa |
| 1950 | Vice Champion | UCES | Riquezas do Brasil | Lino Manuel dos Reis |
| 1950 | Vice Champion | UCES | Riquezas do Brasil | Manacéa |
| 1951 | Champion | UGESB | A volta do filho pródigo | Lino Manuel dos Reis |
| 1951 | Champion | UGESB | A volta do filho pródigo | Chatim |
| 1952 | There was no tender | | Brasil de ontem | Lino Manuel dos Reis |
| 1952 | There was no tender | | Brasil de ontem | Manacéa |
| 1953 | Champion | Grupo 1 | Seis datas magnas | Lino Manuel dos Reis |
| 1953 | Champion | Grupo 1 | Seis datas magnas | Candeia |
| 1954 | 4th place | Grupo 1 | São Paulo Quatrocentão | Lino Manuel dos Reis |
| 1954 | 4th place | Grupo 1 | São Paulo Quatrocentão | Candeia |
| 1955 | 3rd place | Grupo 1 | Festas juninas em fevereiro | Armando Santos |
| 1955 | 3rd place | Grupo 1 | Festas juninas em fevereiro | Candeia |
| 1956 | Vice Champion | Grupo 1 | Tesouros do Brasil, ou riquezas do Brasil ou Gigante pela própria natureza | Lino Manuel dos Reis |
| 1956 | Vice Champion | Grupo 1 | Tesouros do Brasil, ou riquezas do Brasil ou Gigante pela própria natureza | Candeia |
| 1957 | Champion | Grupo 1 | Legados de D. João VI | Djalma Vogue; Candeia; Joacir |
| 1957 | Champion | Grupo 1 | Legados de D. João VI | Candeia |
| 1958 | Champion | Grupo 1 | Vultos e efemérides | Djalma Vogue |
| 1958 | Champion | Grupo 1 | Vultos e efemérides | Candeia |
| 1959 | Champion | Grupo 1 | Brasil, Panteon de Glórias | Djalma Vogue |
| 1959 | Champion | Grupo 1 | Brasil, Panteon de Glórias | Candeia |
| 1960 | Champion | Grupo 1 | Rio cidade eterna | Djalma Vogue |
| 1960 | Champion | Grupo 1 | Rio cidade eterna | Silvinho da Portela |
| 1961 | 3rd place | Grupo 1 | Jóias e lendas do Brasil | Djalma Vogue |
| 1961 | 3rd place | Grupo 1 | Jóias e lendas do Brasil | Silvinho da Portela |
| 1962 | Champion | Grupo 1 | Rugendas ou Viagens pitorescas pelo Brasil | Nélson de Andrade |
| 1962 | Champion | Grupo 1 | Rugendas ou Viagens pitorescas pelo Brasil | Silvinho da Portela |
| 1963 | 4th place | Grupo 1 | Barão de Mauá e suas realizações | Nilton; Oreba; Peres; Finfas |
| 1963 | 4th place | Grupo 1 | Barão de Mauá e suas realizações | Silvinho da Portela |
| 1964 | Champion | Grupo 1 | O segundo casamento de D. Pedro II | Nélson de Andrade |
| 1964 | Champion | Grupo 1 | O segundo casamento de D. Pedro II | Abílio Martins |
| 1965 | 3rd place | Grupo 1 | História e tradição do Rio Quatrocentão | Nélson de Andrade |
| 1965 | 3rd place | Grupo 1 | História e tradição do Rio Quatrocentão | Abílio Martins |
| 1966 | Champion | Grupo 1 | Memórias de um sargento de milícias | Nélson de Andrade |
| 1966 | Champion | Grupo 1 | Memórias de um sargento de milícias | Catoni |
| 1967 | 6th place | Grupo 1 | Tal dia é o batizado | Nélson de Andrade; Juvenal Portela; Laurênio |
| 1967 | 6th place | Grupo 1 | Tal dia é o batizado | Catoni |
| 1968 | 4th place | Grupo 1 | Tronco de Ipê | João Ramos Macedo |
| 1968 | 4th place | Grupo 1 | Tronco de Ipê | Silvinho da Portela |
| 1969 | 3rd place | Grupo 1 | Treze naus | Clóvis Bornay |
| 1969 | 3rd place | Grupo 1 | Treze naus | Silvinho da Portela |
| 1970 | Champion | Grupo 1 | Lendas e mistérios da Amazônia | Clóvis Bornay |
| 1970 | Champion | Grupo 1 | Lendas e mistérios da Amazônia | Silvinho da Portela |
| 1971 | Vice Champion | Grupo 1 | A Lapa em três tempos | Arnaldo Pederneiras |
| 1971 | Vice Champion | Grupo 1 | A Lapa em três tempos | Silvinho da Portela |
| 1972 | 3rd place | Grupo 1 | Ilu Ayê | Candeia and Hiran Araújo |
| 1972 | 3rd place | Grupo 1 | Ilu Ayê | Silvinho da Portela |
| 1973 | 4th place | Grupo 1 | Pasárgada, o amigo do rei | Hiran Araújo |
| 1973 | 4th place | Grupo 1 | Pasárgada, o amigo do rei | Silvinho da Portela |
| 1974 | Vice-Champion | Grupo 1 | O mundo melhor de Pixinguinha | Hiran Araújo and Cláudio Pinheiro |
| 1974 | Vice-Champion | Grupo 1 | O mundo melhor de Pixinguinha | Silvinho da Portela |
| 1975 | 5th place | Grupo 1 | Macunaíma, herói de nossa gente | Hiran Araújo |
| 1975 | 5th place | Grupo 1 | Macunaíma, herói de nossa gente | Silvinho da Portela |
| 1976 | 4th place | Grupo 1 | O Homem do Pacoval | Hiran Araújo; Maurício Assis |
| 1976 | 4th place | Grupo 1 | O Homem do Pacoval | Silvinho da Portela |
| 1977 | Vice Champion | Grupo 1 | A Festa de Aclamação | Viriato Ferreira |
| 1977 | Vice Champion | Grupo 1 | A Festa de Aclamação | Silvinho da Portela |
| 1978 | 5th place | Grupo 1 | Mulher à Brasileira | Viriato Ferreira |
| 1978 | 5th place | Grupo 1 | Mulher à Brasileira | Silvinho da Portela |
| 1979 | 3rd place | Grupo 1A | Incrível, fantástico, extraordinário | Viriato Ferreira |
| 1979 | 3rd place | Grupo 1A | Incrível, fantástico, extraordinário | Silvinho da Portela |
| 1980 | Champion | Grupo 1A | Hoje tem marmelada | Viriato Ferreira |
| 1980 | Champion | Grupo 1A | Hoje tem marmelada | Silvinho da Portela |
| 1981 | 3rd place | Grupo 1A | Das Maravilhas do Mar, fez-se o esplendor de uma noite | Viriato Ferreira |
| 1981 | 3rd place | Grupo 1A | Das Maravilhas do Mar, fez-se o esplendor de uma noite | Silvinho da Portela |
| 1982 | Vice Champion | Grupo 1A | Meu Brasil brasileiro | Edmundo Braga |
| 1982 | Vice Champion | Grupo 1A | Meu Brasil brasileiro | Silvinho da Portela |
| 1983 | Vice Champion | Grupo 1A | A Ressurreição das Coroas, Reino e Reinado | Edmundo Braga; Paulino Espírito Santo |
| 1983 | Vice Champion | Grupo 1A | A Ressurreição das Coroas, Reino e Reinado | Silvinho da Portela |
| 1984 | Champion | Grupo 1A | Contos de areia | Edmundo Braga; Paulino Espírito Santo |
| 1984 | Champion | Grupo 1A | Contos de areia | Silvinho da Portela |
| 1985 | 4th place | Grupo 1A | Recordar é viver | Alexandre Louzada |
| 1985 | 4th place | Grupo 1A | Recordar é viver | Silvinho da Portela |
| 1986 | 4th place | Grupo 1A | Morfeu no carnaval, a utopia brasileira | Alexandre Louzada |
| 1986 | 4th place | Grupo 1A | Morfeu no carnaval, a utopia brasileira | Silvinho da Portela |
| 1987 | 3rd place | Grupo 1A | Adelaide, a pomba da paz | Geraldo Cavalcanti |
| 1987 | 3rd place | Grupo 1A | Adelaide, a pomba da paz | Dedé da Portela |
| 1988 | 5th place | Grupo 1 | Na lenda carioca, os sonhos do vice-rei | Geraldo Cavalcanti |
| 1988 | 5th place | Grupo 1 | Na lenda carioca, os sonhos do vice-rei | Dedé da Portela |
| 1989 | 6th place | Grupo 1 | Achado não é roubado | Sylvio Cunha |
| 1989 | 6th place | Grupo 1 | Achado não é roubado | Dedé da Portela |
| 1990 | 10th place | Grupo Especial | É de ouro e prata esse chão | Sylvio Cunha |
| 1990 | 10th place | Grupo Especial | É de ouro e prata esse chão | Dedé da Portela |
| 1991 | 6th place | Grupo Especial | Tributo à vaidade | Sylvio Cunha |
| 1991 | 6th place | Grupo Especial | Tributo à vaidade | Dedé da Portela |
| 1992 | 5th place | Grupo Especial | Todo o azul que o azul tem | Sylvio Cunha |
| 1992 | 5th place | Grupo Especial | Todo o azul que o azul tem | Dedé da Portela |
| 1993 | 10th place | Grupo Especial | Cerimônia de casamento | Mário Monteiro |
| 1993 | 10th place | Grupo Especial | Cerimônia de casamento | Dedé da Portela |
| 1994 | 7th place | Grupo Especial | Quando o samba era samba | José Félix |
| 1994 | 7th place | Grupo Especial | Quando o samba era samba | Dedé da Portela |
| 1995 | Vice Champion | Grupo Especial | Gosto que me enrosco | José Félix |
| 1995 | Vice Champion | Grupo Especial | Gosto que me enrosco | Rixxah; Carlinhos de Pilares |
| 1996 | 8th place | Grupo Especial | Essa gente bronzeada mostra seu valor | José Félix |
| 1996 | 8th place | Grupo Especial | Essa gente bronzeada mostra seu valor | Rixxah |
| 1997 | 8th place | Grupo Especial | Linda, eternamente Olinda | Ilvamar Magalhães |
| 1997 | 8th place | Grupo Especial | Linda, eternamente Olinda | Rixxah |
| 1998 | 4th place | Grupo Especial | Os olhos da noite | Ilvamar Magalhães |
| 1998 | 4th place | Grupo Especial | Os olhos da noite | Rogerinho |
| 1999 | 8th place | Grupo Especial | De volta aos caminhos de Minas Gerais | José Félix |
| 1999 | 8th place | Grupo Especial | De volta aos caminhos de Minas Gerais | Rogerinho |
| 2000 | 10th place | Grupo Especial | Trabalhadores do Brasil, a época de Getúlio Vargas | José Félix |
| 2000 | 10th place | Grupo Especial | Trabalhadores do Brasil, a época de Getúlio Vargas | Gera |
| 2001 | 10th place | Grupo Especial | Querer é poder | Alexandre Louzada |
| 2001 | 10th place | Grupo Especial | Querer é poder | Gera |
| 2002 | 8th place | Grupo Especial | Amazonas, Esse Desconhecido... Delírios e Verdades do Eldorado Verde | Alexandre Louzada |
| 2002 | 8th place | Grupo Especial | Amazonas, Esse Desconhecido... Delírios e Verdades do Eldorado Verde | Gera |
| 2003 | 8th place | Grupo Especial | Ontem, Hoje, Sempre Cinelândia - O Samba entra em cena na Broadway Brasileira" | Alexandre Louzada |
| 2003 | 8th place | Grupo Especial | Ontem, Hoje, Sempre Cinelândia - O Samba entra em cena na Broadway Brasileira" | Gera |
| 2004 | 7th place | Grupo Especial | Lendas e mistérios da Amazônia | Jorge Freitas |
| 2004 | 7th place | Grupo Especial | Lendas e mistérios da Amazônia | Gera |
| 2005 | 13th place | Grupo Especial | Nós Podemos: Oito Idéias para Mudar o Mundo | Amarildo de Mello; Nélson Ricardo |
| 2005 | 13th place | Grupo Especial | Nós Podemos: Oito Idéias para Mudar o Mundo | Bruno Ribas |
| 2006 | 7th place | Grupo Especial | Brasil, Marca a tua Cara e Mostra para o Mundo | Amarildo de Mello; Ilvamar Magalhães |
| 2006 | 7th place | Grupo Especial | Brasil, Marca a tua Cara e Mostra para o Mundo | Gilsinho |
| 2007 | 8th place | Grupo Especial | Os deuses do Olimpo na terra do carnaval: uma festa dos esportes, da saúde e da beleza | Amarildo de Mello; Cahê Rodrigues |
| 2007 | 8th place | Grupo Especial | Os deuses do Olimpo na terra do carnaval: uma festa dos esportes, da saúde e da beleza | Gilsinho |
| 2008 | 4th place | Grupo Especial | Reconstruindo a Natureza, Recriando a Vida: O Sonho Vira Realidade | Cahê Rodrigues |
| 2008 | 4th place | Grupo Especial | Reconstruindo a Natureza, Recriando a Vida: O Sonho Vira Realidade | Gilsinho |
| 2009 | 3rd place | Grupo Especial | E por falar em amor... Onde anda você? | Lane Santana; Jorge Caribé |
| 2009 | 3rd place | Grupo Especial | E por falar em amor... Onde anda você? | Gilsinho |
| 2010 | 9th place | Grupo Especial | Derrubando fronteiras, conquistando a liberdade, um Rio de paz em estado de graça | Amauri Santos; Alex Oliveira |
| 2010 | 9th place | Grupo Especial | Derrubando fronteiras, conquistando a liberdade, um Rio de paz em estado de graça | Gilsinho |
| 2011 | Hors Concours | Grupo Especial | Rio, Azul da Cor do Mar | Roberto Szaniecki |
| 2011 | Hors Concours | Grupo Especial | Rio, Azul da Cor do Mar | Gilsinho |
| 2012 | 6th place | Grupo Especial | E o Povo na Rua Cantando. É Feito uma Reza, um Ritual... | Paulo Menezes |
| 2012 | 6th place | Grupo Especial | E o Povo na Rua Cantando. É Feito uma Reza, um Ritual... | Gilsinho |
| 2013 | 7th place | Grupo Especial | Madureira... onde o meu coração se deixou levar | Paulo Menezes |
| 2013 | 7th place | Grupo Especial | Madureira... onde o meu coração se deixou levar | Gilsinho |
| 2014 | 3rd place | Grupo Especial | Um Rio, de Mar a Mar. Do Valongo à Glória de São Sebastião | Alexandre Louzada |
| 2014 | 3rd place | Grupo Especial | Um Rio, de Mar a Mar. Do Valongo à Glória de São Sebastião | Wantuir |
| 2015 | 4th place | Grupo Especial | ImaginaRIO - 450 janeiros de uma cidade surreal | Alexandre Louzada |
| 2015 | 4th place | Grupo Especial | ImaginaRIO - 450 janeiros de uma cidade surreal | Wantuir; Wander Pires |
| 2016 | 3rd place | Grupo Especial | No voo da águia, uma viagem sem fim... | Paulo Barros |
| 2016 | 3rd place | Grupo Especial | No voo da águia, uma viagem sem fim... | Wantuir; Gilsinho |
| 2017 | Champion | Grupo Especial | Quem nunca sentiu o corpo arrepiar ao ver esse Rio passar... | Paulo Barros |
| 2017 | Champion | Grupo Especial | Quem nunca sentiu o corpo arrepiar ao ver esse Rio passar... | Gilsinho |
| 2018 | 4th place | Grupo Especial | De Repente de Lá Pra Cá e Dirrepente Daqui Pra Lá... | Rosa Magalhães |
| 2018 | 4th place | Grupo Especial | De Repente de Lá Pra Cá e Dirrepente Daqui Pra Lá... | Gilsinho |
| 2019 | 4th place | Grupo Especial | Na Madureira moderníssima, hei sempre de ouvir cantar uma Sabiá | Rosa Magalhães |
| 2019 | 4th place | Grupo Especial | Na Madureira moderníssima, hei sempre de ouvir cantar uma Sabiá | Gilsinho |
| 2020 | 7th place | Grupo Especial | Guajupiá, terra sem males | Renato Lage; Márcia Lage |
| 2020 | 7th place | Grupo Especial | Guajupiá, terra sem males | Gilsinho |
| 2022 | 5th place | Grupo Especial | Igi Osé Baobá | Renato Lage; Márcia Lage |
| 2022 | 5th place | Grupo Especial | Igi Osé Baobá | Gilsinho |
| 2023 | 10th place | Grupo Especial | | |
| 2024 | 5th place | Grupo Especial | | |

== Championships and awards ==
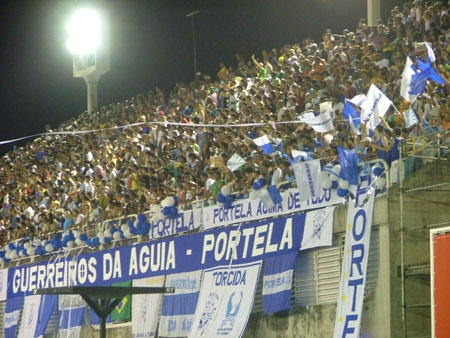
Fans of GRES Portela cheering during parade

Portela is the record samba school of Carnaval titles of Rio de Janeiro, being general champion for 22 times: 1935, 1939, 1941, 1942, 1943, 1944, 1945, 1946, 1947, 1951 (UGESB), 1953, 1957, 1958, 1959, 1960, 1962, 1964, 1966, 1970, 1980, 1984 and 2017. The school got runner up honors in the following years: 1937, 1949, 1950, 1956, 1971, 1974, 1977, 1982, 1983, and 1995.

The school accumulates a total of 52 Estandarte de Ouro (Gold Standards), prize conceded by the newspaper O Globo:

- 1972: Drum Block
- 1973: Feminine notability (Tia Vicentina)
- 1974: Ala (of baianas) and master of ceremonies (Bagdá)
- 1975: Samba-enredo
- 1976: School
- 1977: Standard-bearer (Vilma Nascimento) and feminine dancer (Nega Pelé)
- 1978: Standard-bearer (Vilma Nascimento) and masculine dancer (Jerônimo)
- 1979: School, samba-enredo, ala (velha-guarda), standard-bearer (Vilma Nascimento), feminine dancer (Denise) and masculine dancer (Marcelo)
- 1980: School, audience impact and feminine dancer (Nívea)
- 1981: Best Front commission and samba-enredo
- 1982: Best Front commission
- 1983: Leading singer of the samba parade (Silvinho)
- 1986: Best Drum Block, feminine notability (Dodô) and ala (Luxo do Lixo)
- 1987: Samba-enredo
- 1988: Masculine dancer(Gilson)
- 1990: Feminine dancer (Solange Couto)
- 1991: Samba-enredo, front commission, revelation (Patrícia) and ala (of queens)
- 1995: School, samba-enredo and leading singer of the parade (Rixxa)
- 1998: Samba-enredo and masculine dancer (Cláudio Lima)
- 2001: Commission of front
- 2004: Personality (Dodô)
- 2005: Revelation (Bruno Ribas)
- 2006: Revelation (Nilo Sérgio)
- 2007: Revelation (Alessandra Bessa) and masculine dancer (Ruanderson)
- 2008: Female dancer
- 2010: Drum Block
- 2012: Drum Block, leading singer of the parade, samba-enredo and best dancers (male and female)
- 2013: Drum Block
- 2014: Ala (Senior Women's')
- 2015: Revelation (Alex Marcelino)
- 2016: Personality (Monarco)

== Notable Portelenses ==
- Aldir Blanc
- Alexandre Louzada
- Agepê
- Ana Paula Araújo
- Argemiro Patrocínio
- Candeia
- Carla Vilhena
- Carlinhos Brown
- Carlos Roberto
- Casquinha
- Clara Nunes
- Clementina de Jesus
- Dejan Petković
- Diogo Nogueira
- Dodô da Portela
- Eduardo Paes
- Gilberto Gil
- Glória Pires
- Heitor dos Prazeres
- Hilário Jovino Ferreira
- Jair do Cavaco
- João Nogueira
- Juliana Diniz
- Luiz Ayrão
- Luma de Oliveira
- Manacéa
- Maria Rita
- Marisa Monte
- Mauro Diniz
- Monarco
- Noca da Portela
- Paulinho da Costa
- Paulinho da Viola
- Paulo César Pinheiro
- Sheron Menezzes
- Teresa Cristina
- Tia Doca
- Tia Surica
- Wilson Moreira
- Zeca Pagodinho
- Zé Keti

== In popular culture ==
=== Cinema ===
- The film Natal da Portela (1988), by Paulo César Saraceni, tells the story of the underground lottery operator and school sponsor by the same name.
- In the film Um Ano Inesquecível – Verão (An unforgettble year - Summer) (2023), by Cris D'Amato, a young woman gets a job as a seamstress in Portela's samba school and discovers the world of carnival.

=== Literature ===
- In the short story Amor de Carnaval, by Thalita Rebouças, from the collection Um Ano Inesquecível, (2015), a young woman gets a job as a seamstress in Portela's samba school and discovers the world of carnival.
