= Tudo Azul =

Studio album by Velha Guarda da Portela
- Released: 1999
- Recorded: Mega Studio, Rio de Janeiro, Brazil, April 1999
- Genre: Samba
- Length: 44:39
- Label: Phonomotor Records
- Producer: Marisa Monte

Tudo Azul is an album recorded in 1999 by the Velha Guarda da Portela (Portuguese for "Portela's Oldest-Ones"). The album was produced by famous Brazilian singer Marisa Monte, which is featured in one of the tracks. Tudo Azul features tracks written from 1945 to 1972.

== Track listing ==
1. "Portela Desde que Eu Nasci" (Monarco) – 1:20
  - Monarco – lead vocals, cuíca
  - Jair do Cavaquinho – cavaquinho
2. "O Mundo é Assim" (Alvaiade) – 2:20
  - Paulão – acoustic guitar
  - Guaracy – seven-string acoustic guitar
  - Serginho Procópio – cavaquinho
  - Ronaldo do Bandolim – mandolin
  - Cabelinho – floor tom
  - Casemiro da Cuíca – cuíca
  - Jair do Cavaquinho – tamborim, ganzá, backing vocals
  - Argemiro – pandeiro, lead vocals, backing vocals
  - David do Pandeiro – pandeiro, backing vocals
  - Casquinha – ganzá, snare drum, backing vocals
  - Monarco – lead vocals, backing vocals
  - Tia Eunice, Tia Doca, Áurea Maria, Surica – backing vocals
3. "Nascer e Florescer" (Manacéa) – 3:51
  - Mauro Diniz – cavaquinho
  - Paulão – acoustic guitar
  - Guaracy – seven-string acoustic guitar
  - Cabelinho – floor tom
  - Jair do Cavaquinho – ganzá, tamborim
  - Casemiro da Cuíca – cuíca
  - Argemiro – pandeiro
  - David do Pandeiro – pandeiro
  - Monarco – lead vocals
  - Tia Eunice, Tia Doca, Áurea Maria, Surica – backing vocals
4. "Vai Saudade" (David do Pandeiro, Candeia) – 1:34
  - David do Pandeiro – lead vocals, pandeiro
  - Jair do Cavaquinho – cavaquinho
  - Argemiro, Casquinha, Monarco, Paulão, Marisa Monte, Pastoras – handclaps
5. "Sabiá Cantador" (Alvarenga) – 3:19
  - Paulão – acoustic guitar
  - Guaracy – seven-string acoustic guitar
  - Serginho Procópio – cavaquinho
  - Ronaldo do Bandolim – tenor guitar
  - Cabelinho – tan-tan
  - Casemiro da Cuíca – cuíca
  - Argemiro – pandeiro, backing vocals
  - David do Pandeiro – pandeiro, backing vocals
  - Casquinha – cymbals, backing vocals
  - Monarco – tamborim, backing vocals
  - Jair do Cavaquinho – lead vocals, backing vocals
  - Tia Eunice, Tia Doca, Áurea Maria, Surica – backing vocals
6. "A Noite que Tudo Esconde" feat. Paulinho da Viola (Chico Santana/Alvaiade) – 2:42
  - Mauro Diniz – cavaquinho
  - Serginho Procópio – cavaquinho
  - Paulão – acoustic guitar
  - Guaracy – seven-string acoustic guitar
  - Roberto Marques – trombone
  - Cabelinho – ganzá, floor tom
  - Argemiro – pandeiro
  - David do Pandeiro – pandeiro
  - Jair do Cavaquinho – tamborim
  - Casemiro da Cuíca – cuíca
  - Monarco – lead vocals
  - Paulinho da Viola – lead vocals
7. "Eu Te Quero" (Jair do Cavaquinho/Colombo) – 1:42
  - Paulão – acoustic guitar
  - Jair do Cavaquinho – lead vocals, cavaquinho
  - Tia Eunice, Tia Doca, Áurea Maria, Surica – backing vocals
8. "Volta Meu Amor" feat. Marisa Monte (Manacéa, Áurea Maria) – 4:22
  - Paulão – acoustic guitar
  - Guaracy – seven-string acoustic guitar
  - Serginho Procópio – cavaquinho
  - Casemiro da Cuíca – cuíca
  - Cabelinho – floor tom, tamborim
  - David do Pandeiro – pandeiro, backing vocals
  - Jair do Cavaquinho – tamborim, matchbox, backing vocals
  - Casquinha – tamborim, matchbox, backing vocals
  - Monarco – tamborim, backing vocals
  - Argemiro – pandeiro, lead vocals, backing vocals
  - Tia Eunice, Tia Doca, Áurea Maria, Surica – backing vocals
  - Marisa Monte – lead vocals
9. "Falsas Juras" (Casquinha, Candeia) – 2:41
  - Paulão – acoustic guitar
  - Guaracy – seven-string acoustic guitar
  - Serginho Procópio – cavaquinho
  - Argemiro – pandeiro
  - David do Pandeiro – pandeiro
  - Monarco – tamborim
  - Jair do Cavaquinho – tamborim
  - Casemiro da Cuíca – cuíca
  - Cabelinho – floor tom
  - Roberto Marques – trombone
  - Casquinha – lead vocals, tamborim, snare drum
  - Tia Eunice, Tia Doca, Áurea Maria, Surica – backing vocals
10. "Tentação" (Casemiro da Cuíca, Ramon Russo) – 1:10
  - Casemiro da Cuíca – lead vocals, cuíca
11. "Você Me Abandonou" (Alberto Lonato) – 2:48
  - Mauro Diniz – cavaquinho
  - Paulão – acoustic guitar
  - Guaracy – seven-string acoustic guitar
  - Jair do Cavaquinho – tamborim
  - Monarco – lead vocals, tamborim
  - Argemiro – pandeiro
  - David do Pandeiro – pandeiro
  - Casemiro da Cuíca – cuíca
  - Cabelinho – floor tom
  - Casquinha – snare drum
  - Tia Eunice, Tia Doca, Áurea Maria, Surica – backing vocals
12. "Vem Amor" (Casquinha) – 1:00
  - Jair do Cavaquinho – cavaquinho
  - Casquinha – lead vocals, percussion, plastic shopping bag
13. "Benjamim" (Josias) – 2:04
  - Paulão – acoustic guitar, steeldrum
  - Guaracy – seven-string acoustic guitar
  - Serginho Procópio – cavaquinho
  - Casemiro da Cuíca – cuíca
  - Casquinha – snare drum
  - Jair do Cavaquinho – tamborim
  - David do Pandeiro – pandeiro, bowl
  - Argemiro – pandeiro
  - Cabelinho – floor tom, agogô
  - Monarco – lead vocals
  - Tia Eunice, Tia Doca, Áurea Maria, Surica – backing vocals
14. "Tudo Azul" (Ventura) – 2:45
  - Paulão – acoustic guitar
  - Guaracy – seven-string acoustic guitar
  - Serginho Procópio – cavaquinho
  - Casemiro da Cuíca – cuíca
  - David do Pandeiro – pandeiro, backing vocals
  - Argemiro – pandeiro, backing vocals
  - Cabelinho – floor tom, pandeiro
  - Casquinha – snare drum
  - Roberto Marques – trombone
  - Monarco – lead vocals, backing vocals
  - Jair do Cavaquinho – backing vocals
  - Tia Eunice, Tia Doca, Áurea Maria, Surica – backing vocals
15. "Minha Vontade" feat. Cristina Buarque (Chatim) – 1:18
  - Paulão – acoustic guitar
  - Cristina Buarque – lead vocals
  - Tia Eunice, Tia Doca, Áurea Maria, Surica – backing vocals
16. "Sempre Teu Amor" (Manacéa) – 3:05
  - Mauro Diniz – cavaquinho
  - Paulão – acoustic guitar
  - Guaracy – seven-string acoustic guitar
  - Casquinha – tamborim, backing vocals
  - Monarco – tamborim, backing vocals
  - Casquinha – tamborim, lead vocals, backing vocals
  - Casemiro da Cuíca – cuíca
  - Argemiro – pandeiro, backing vocals, lead vocals
  - David do Pandeiro – pandeiro, backing vocals
  - Jair do Cavaquinho – backing vocals
  - Tia Eunice, Tia Doca, Áurea Maria, Surica – backing vocals
17. "Corri pra Ver" (Chico Santana, Monarco, Casquinha) – 3:28
  - Mauro Diniz – cavaquinho
  - Paulão – acoustic guitar, tamborim
  - Guaracy – seven-string acoustic guitar
  - Serginho Procópio – cavaquinho
  - Argemiro – pandeiro, backing vocals
  - David do Pandeiro – pandeiro, tamborim, backing vocals
  - Jair do Cavaquinho – tamborim
  - Cabelinho – pandeiro, agogô, floor tom, tamborim, pea whistle
  - Monarco – lead vocals, backing vocals
  - Casquinha – backing vocals
  - Tia Eunice, Tia Doca, Áurea Maria, Surica – backing vocals
18. "Lenço" feat. Zeca Pagodinho (Chico Santana, Monarco) – 3:10
  - Paulão – acoustic guitar
  - Guaracy – seven-string acoustic guitar
  - Serginho Procópio – cavaquinho
  - Cabelinho – agogô, floor tom, ganzá
  - Argemiro – pandeiro, backing vocals
  - David do Pandeiro – pandeiro, backing vocals
  - Jair do Cavaquinho – tamborim, backing vocals
  - Casemiro da Cuíca – cuíca
  - Casquinha – snare drum, backing vocals
  - Roberto Marques – trombone
  - Monarco – lead vocals, backing vocals
  - Zeca Pagodinho – lead vocals

== See also ==
- Samba
- GRES Portela
- Brazilian Carnival
