= Tia Surica =

Brazilian samba singer and actress (born 1940)

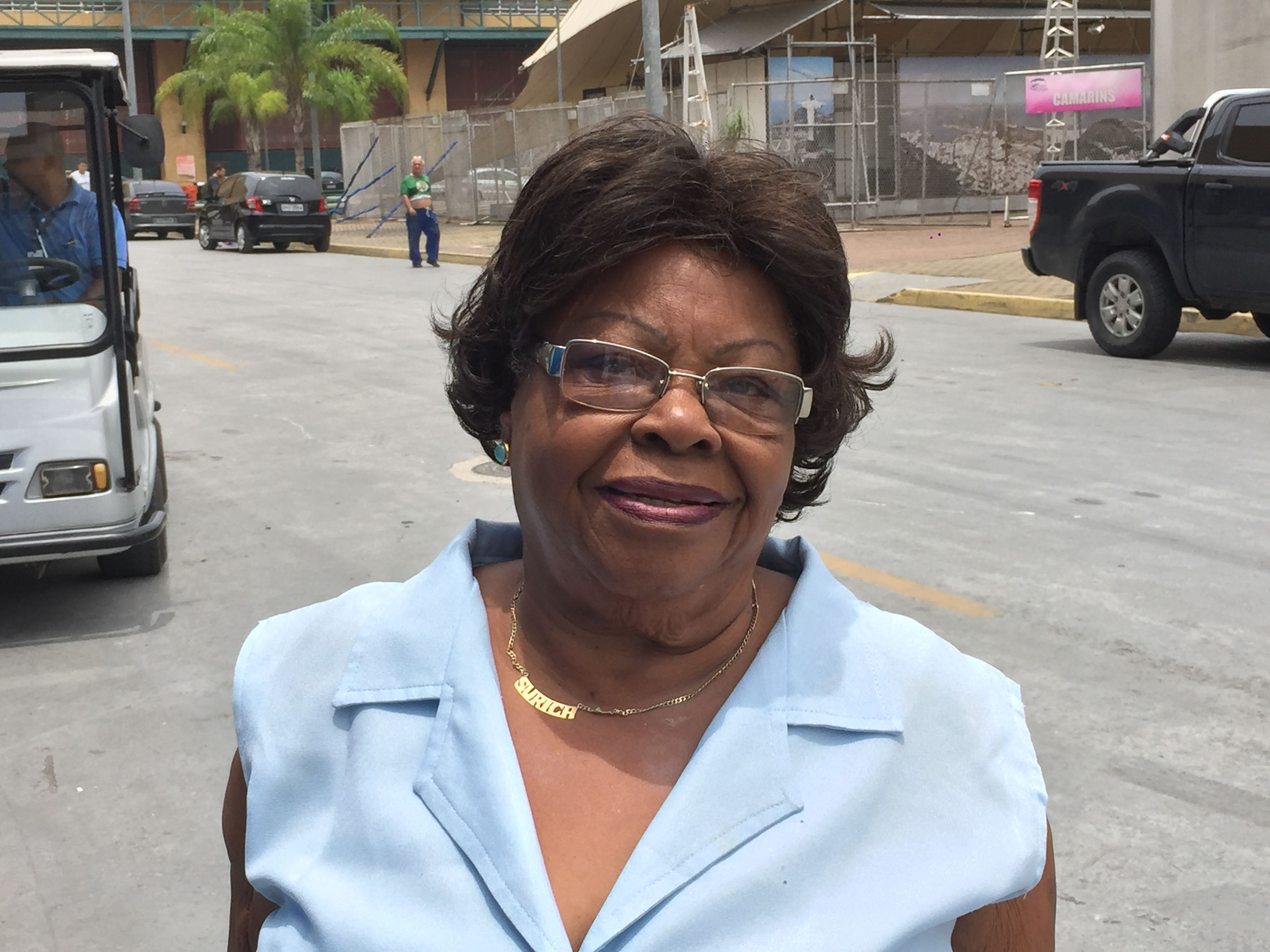
- Tia Surica

Background information
- Also known as: Aunt Surica
- Born: Iranette Ferreira Barcellos; November 17, 1940 (age 85)
- Origin: Madureira, Brazil
- Genres: Samba
- Occupations: Singer, actress
- Instrument: vocals
- Years active: 1966–present
- Website: http://www.tiasurica.com.br/

Iranette Ferreira Barcellos (known as Tia Surica or Aunt Surica; born November 17, 1940, in Madureira, Brazil) is a Brazilian samba singer and actress.

== Biography ==
Surica was born in Madureira in 1940 to Judith and Pio Barcellos. She attended the Portela School from age four. She was given her nickname Surica by her grandmother.

In 1966, she sang the carnival samba Memórias de um Sargento de Milícias, with Maninho and Catoni. The song was written by Paulinho da Viola. In 1980, she was part of the musical group Velha Guarda da Portela ("Old Guard of Portela").

In 2003, Surica released her first album, containing old songs of Portela, written by Monarco, Chico Santana and Anice.

Surica currently lives in Madureira village, close to the city, in her house called the Cafofo da Surica ("the sweet home of Surica"). Her house has become a meeting place for artists of the Portela School.

She has acted in a cameo role in the television programme City of Men and also in other roles in several TV shows and commercials.

== Media ==
- Samba on your Feet, 2005
