= Zé Keti =

Brazilian composer and musician (1921–1999)

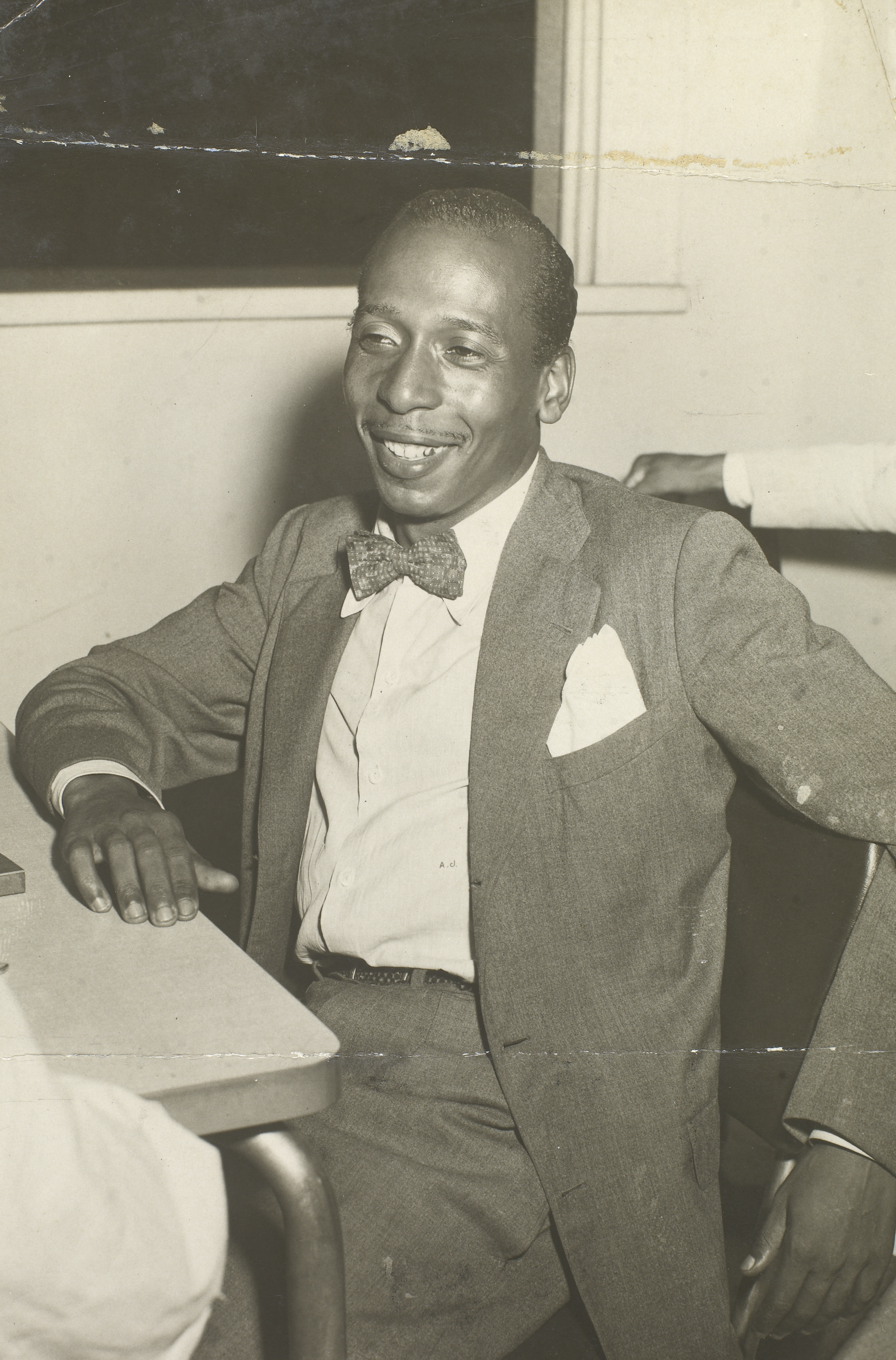
- Zé Keti in 1956

Background information
- Born: José Flores de Jesus; 16 September 1921; Rio de Janeiro, Brazil
- Died: 14 November 1999 (aged 78) Rio de Janeiro, Brazil
- Genres: Samba, marchinha
- Occupations: Musician; composer; songwriter; singer
- Years active: 1940s–1990s

José Flores de Jesus, better known by his stage name Zé Keti, was a Brazilian singer and samba composer.

== Biography ==
José Flores de Jesus was born on September 16th, 1921, in the Inhaúma neighborhood of Rio de Janeiro. Son of Josué Vale da Cruz, a sailor and cavaquinho player, he grew up surrounded by music. A shy child, José was given the nickname of "Zé Quieto" or "Zé Quietinho," meaning "Quiet José." This childhood nickname would serve as the source of his eventual stage name Zé Keti.

In 1924, he moved to Bangu to live with his grandfather, the flautist and pianist João Dionísio Santana, who often hosted musical gatherings attended by famous Brazilian musicians such as Pixinguinha and Cândido das Neves, among others. After the death of his grandfather in 1928, he moved to Rua Dona Clara, where he sang about samba, life in Rio's favelas, and his loves.

He began performing in the 1940s, in the composers' wing of the Portela samba school. Between 1940 and 1943, he composed his first Carnival march: "Se o feio doesse" (If ugliness hurts). In 1946, "Tio Sam no Samba" was his first recorded samba (by the group Vocalistas Tropicais). In 1951, he had his first big hit with the samba "Amor passageiro", a partnership with Jorge Abdala recorded by Linda Batista on RCA. In the same year, his samba "Amar é bom", written with Jorge Abdala, was recorded on Todamérica by Garotos da Lua.

In 1955, his career began to take off when his samba "A voz do morro", recorded by Jorge Goulart and arranged by Radamés Gnattali, was a huge success on the soundtrack of Nelson Pereira dos Santos' film Rio 40 graus. In this film, he also worked as a second assistant cameraman and actor. Another hit in the 1950s was "Leviana", which was also included in the film "Rio 40 Graus" by dos Santos, a director with whom he also worked on the film Rio Zona Norte (1957). The latter, for which dos Santos wrote the script, was inspired by the composer's life.

In 1962 he formed the group A Voz do Morro, in which he participated and which also included Elton Medeiros, Paulinho da Viola, Anescarzinho do Salgueiro, Jair do Cavaquinho, José da Cruz, Oscar Bigode and Nelson Sargento. The group released three albums.

In 1964, he appeared on the show "Opinião" alongside João do Vale and Nara Leão, which led to the concert that popularized his compositions such as "Opinião" (Opinion) and "Diz que Fui por Aí" (Say I Went Over There). The following year, he released "Acender as Velas" (Light the Candles), which is widely considered one of his best compositions. A post-1964 period protest song, the samba's lyrics illustrate a dramatic account of daily life in the favela. Nara Leão and Elis Regina had a huge success with their recording of this song.

Also in 1964, he recorded a single for the Rozemblit label, which included the song "Nega Dina" (Black Dina). Around the same time, he received the Euterpe trophy as best composer from Rio de Janeiro and, along with Nelson Cavaquinho, the O Guarany trophy as best Brazilian composer. With Hildebrando Matos, he composed the hit marcha-rancho "Máscara Negra" (Black Mask) in 1967, recorded by himself and also by Dalva de Oliveira. It won first place in the 1st Carnival Music Contest, created that year by the Superior Council of MPB of the Museum of Image and Sound. In 1968, he appeared in the soap opera Vidas em Conflito by Teixeira Filho on TV Excelsior in São Paulo.

In the following years, Zé's popularity waned and he lived in relative obscurity. During the 1980s, he lived in São Paulo and suffered his first stroke in early July of 1987. In 1995, he returned to live in Rio with his daughter. He continued to sing and compose, releasing a new album that year.

In 1996, he released the CD "75 Anos de Samba" (75 Years of Samba), featuring Zeca Pagodinho, Monarco, Wilson Moreira, and Cristina Buarque. Produced by Henrique Cazes, this CD featured four new songs and several older hits. That same year, he performed several samba classics with Marisa Monte and the Paulinho da Viola's band Velha Guarda da Portela, including Cartola's "A Voz do Morro" and "O Mundo é um Moinho."

In 1997, he received a trophy from Portela in recognition of his work and participated in the recording of the album Casa da Mãe Joana. In 1998, he won the Shell Award for his life's work of over 200 songs. That night, he was honored by many Portela musicians, including Paulinho da Viola, Élton Medeiros, Monarco, and Velha Guarda itself, in a show directed by Sérgio Cabral and staged, for a single night, at Canecão do RJ.

In January 1999, he received a plaque commemorating his 60-year career in the Cobal do Humaitá samba circle. He performed alongside Portela's Velha Guarda and had several songs re-recorded.

Zé Keti died of multiple organ failure at the age of 78 in 1999.
