= Dodô da Portela =

Brazilian samba performer

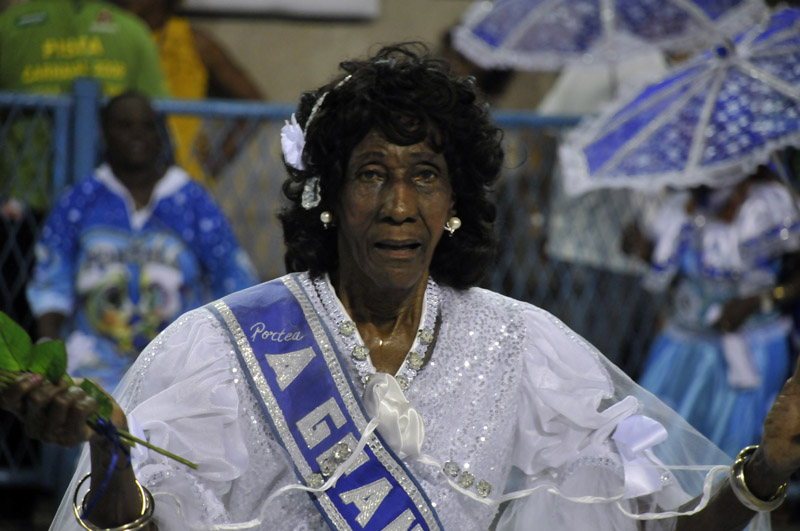
- Dodô da Portela in 2009
- Born: Maria das Dores Alves Rodrigues; January 3, 1920; Barra Mansa, Paraíba Valley, Rio de Janeiro state, Brazil
- Died: January 6, 2015 (aged 95); Rio de Janeiro, Brazil
- Occupation: Samba performer
- Years active: 75
- Known for: Her role as the flag bearer in the Portela Samba school

Maria das Dores Alves Rodrigues, better known as Dodô da Portela (1920 — 2015), was a famous flag bearer for the Portela samba school, the most successful school in the annual Rio de Janeiro Carnival in Brazil.

== Early life ==
Maria das Dores Alves Rodrigues was born on 3 January 1920 in Barra Mansa in the Paraíba Valley in the south of Rio de Janeiro state. One of nine children, three of whom were adopted, she moved to Rio de Janeiro at the age of four, together with her mother and some of her brothers, living in Morro da Providência, while her father and her other siblings stayed in Paraíba. Shortly before turning 14, she got a job as a packer in a cardboard packaging factory, where she met Doralice Borges da Silva (Dora), known as the "Queen of Portela", who recommended her to be the school's flag bearer. Dodô married Aloísio, a dockworker from Mangueira. They had no children.

== Portela samba school ==
Dodô debuted as flag bearer at the age of fifteen in the 1935 Carnival, when Portela won its first title. Portela won eleven championships with Dodô as first flag bearer, before Vilma Nascimento took over her role. She went on to parade as second and third standard bearer until she retired from the flag-bearing role in 1966. In all, Portela, which was the dominant school in the early days of the championships, won 18 times when she was parading. In 1972, the president of Portela, Carlinhos Maracanã, bought Dodô a small store, close to Portela's school. A fervent Catholic, she took responsibility for organising religious events at the school. In 1986, she won the, Estandarte de Ouro (Golden Standard) awarded by the O Globo newspaper, which is considered to be the equivalent of the Oscars for the carnival parade. In 1991 she became president of the Ala das Damas or Ladies' Wing and in that year the Portela ladies also won an Estandarte de Ouro. In the 2004 Carnival, she paraded as Godmother of the Drums with Portela, winning the Estandarte de Ouro for being "Personality" of the Carnival.

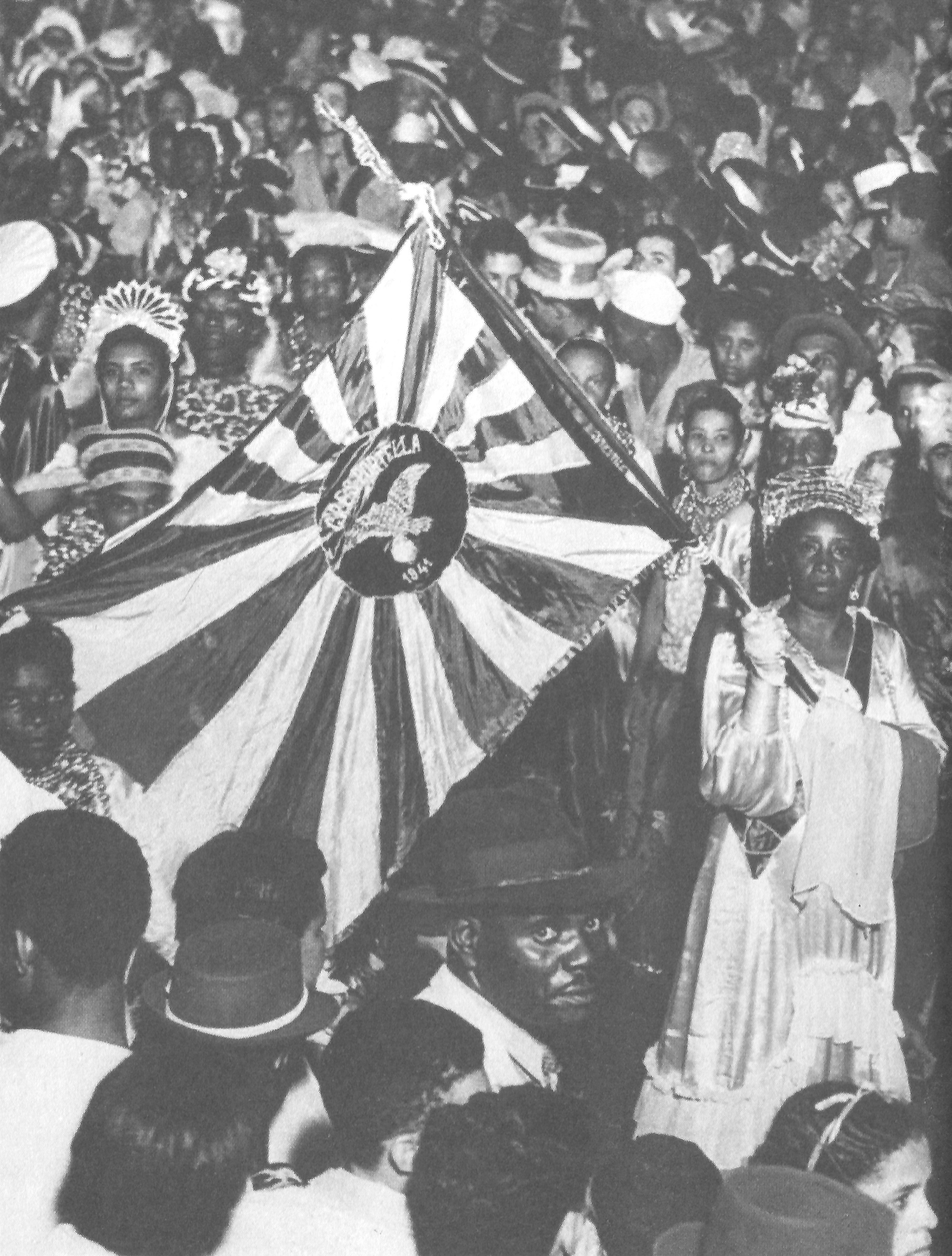
Dodô carrying the Portela flag in the 1941 parade

In 2005, a motion was approved in the Legislative Assembly of the state of Rio de Janeiro, congratulating Dodô for her contribution to the Brazilian carnival. In 2009, she was honoured, along with other samba personalities, in the documentary Velhas Guardas, by Joatan Berbel. In 2013, the book Eleven Incredible Women of Rio Carnival, by Aydano André Motta, featured her story in the first chapter.

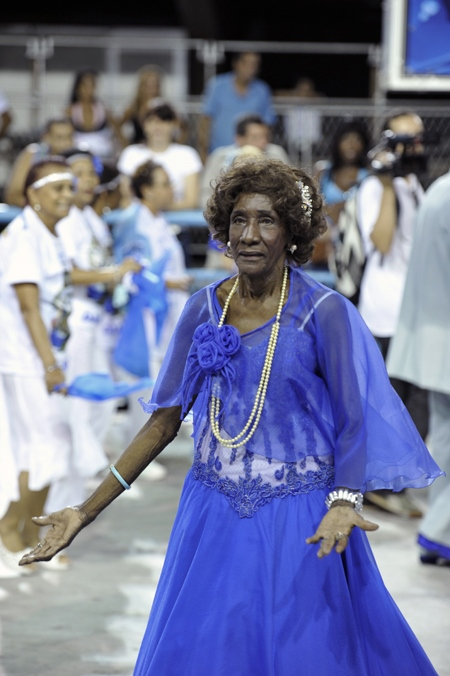
Dodô participates in Portela's technical rehearsal for the 2011 Carnival parade

== Death ==
Maria das Dores Alves Rodrigues was admitted to hospital on 22 December 2014 and died on 6 January 2015 from dehydration and malnutrition. She was buried on the following day at São João Batista cemetery, in Botafogo, in the south of Rio de Janeiro. Numerous tributes were paid, including from members of the Portela samba school, as well as from the mayor of Rio de Janeiro, Eduardo Paes. At her request, the wake was not held at the school's headquarters, which she considered should always be a place of joy. In 2015, Dodô was featured in a mural about 20 meters long and 5 meters high, on Rua Ebroino Uruguai, one of the main entrances to Morro da Providência, where she had lived.
