= Bezerra da Silva =

José Bezerra da Silva
- Born: February 23, 1927; Recife, Brazil
- Died: January 17, 2005 (aged 77) Rio de Janeiro, Brazil
- Genres: Samba, partido alto
- Occupations: Musician, singer
- Instruments: Zabumba, vocals
- Years active: 1950–2005
- Label: Various
- Formerly of: Orquestra Copacabana Discos, Orquestra da TV Globo

José Bezerra da Silva (February 23, 1927 – January 17, 2005) was a Brazilian samba musician of the partido alto style.

== Biography ==
Bezerra da Silva was born on February 23, 1927, in Recife. He played zabumba as a child and sang coco in Recife. He moved to Rio de Janeiro in 1942, and in 1950, Rádio Clube do Brasil hired him as a session musician. In 1960 he became a member of the Orquestra Copacabana Discos of São Paulo, and in the 1970s and 1980s he performed with the Orquestra da TV Globo. He recorded his first singles in 1969, and went on to release 30 albums over the course of his career, charting many hits in his native country. His music often deals with political and social issues, touching on gang violence, the drug trade, and the law.

Bezerra became known for recording sambas from unfamed and marginalized composers, who were often people living in difficulties and dealing with criminal environments, who wrote with sharp irony. The label sambandido (samba + bandit) was sometimes used to refer to his work, and he strongly disliked the word. One of his greatest hits, which was rerecorded several times by various artists, is Malandragem Dá Um Tempo, whose chorus is I'm going to roll, but I won't light it now, an allusion to the efforts marijuana users make in order to avoid the law.

In 2001, he converted to the Universal Church of the Kingdom of God. He died of a heart attack in 2005 at the age of 77.

== Discography ==
- O Rei Do Côco (1976)
- Partido Alto Nota 10 Bezerra e Genaro (1977)
- Partido Alto Nota 10 Vol.2 - Bezerra e Seus Convidados (1979)
- Partido Alto Nota 10 Vol.3 - Bezerra e Rey Jordão (1980)
- Partido Muito Alto (1980)
- Samba Partido e Outras Comidas (1981)
- Bezerra e um Punhado de Bambas (1982)
- Produto do Morro (1983)
- É Esse Aí Que É o Homem (1984)
- Malandro Rife (1985)
- Alô Malandragem, Maloca o Flagrante (1986)
- Justiça Social (1987)
- Violência Gera Violência (1988)
- Se Não Fosse o Samba (1989)
- Eu não sou Santo (1990)
- Partideiro da Pesada (1991)
- Presidente Caô Caô (1992)
- Cocada Boa (1993)
- Bezerra, Moreira e Dicro - Os 3 Malandros In Concert (1995)
- Contra O VERDADEIRO Canalha (Bambas Do Samba) (1995)
- Meu Samba É Duro na Queda (1996)
- Eu Tô de Pé (1998)
- Provando e Comprovando sua Versatilidade (1998)
- Bezerra da Silva: Ao Vivo (1999)
- Malandro é Malandro e Mané é Mané (2000)
- A Gíria é Cultura do Povo (2002)
- Caminho de Luz (2003)
- Pega Eu (2003)
- Meu Bom Juiz (2003)
- O Partido Alto do Samba (2004)
- Série Maxximum - Bezerra da Silva (2005)
- O Samba Malandro de Bezerra da Silva (2005)

== See also ==
- Music of Brazil
