= Samba on your Feet =

Samba On Your Feet
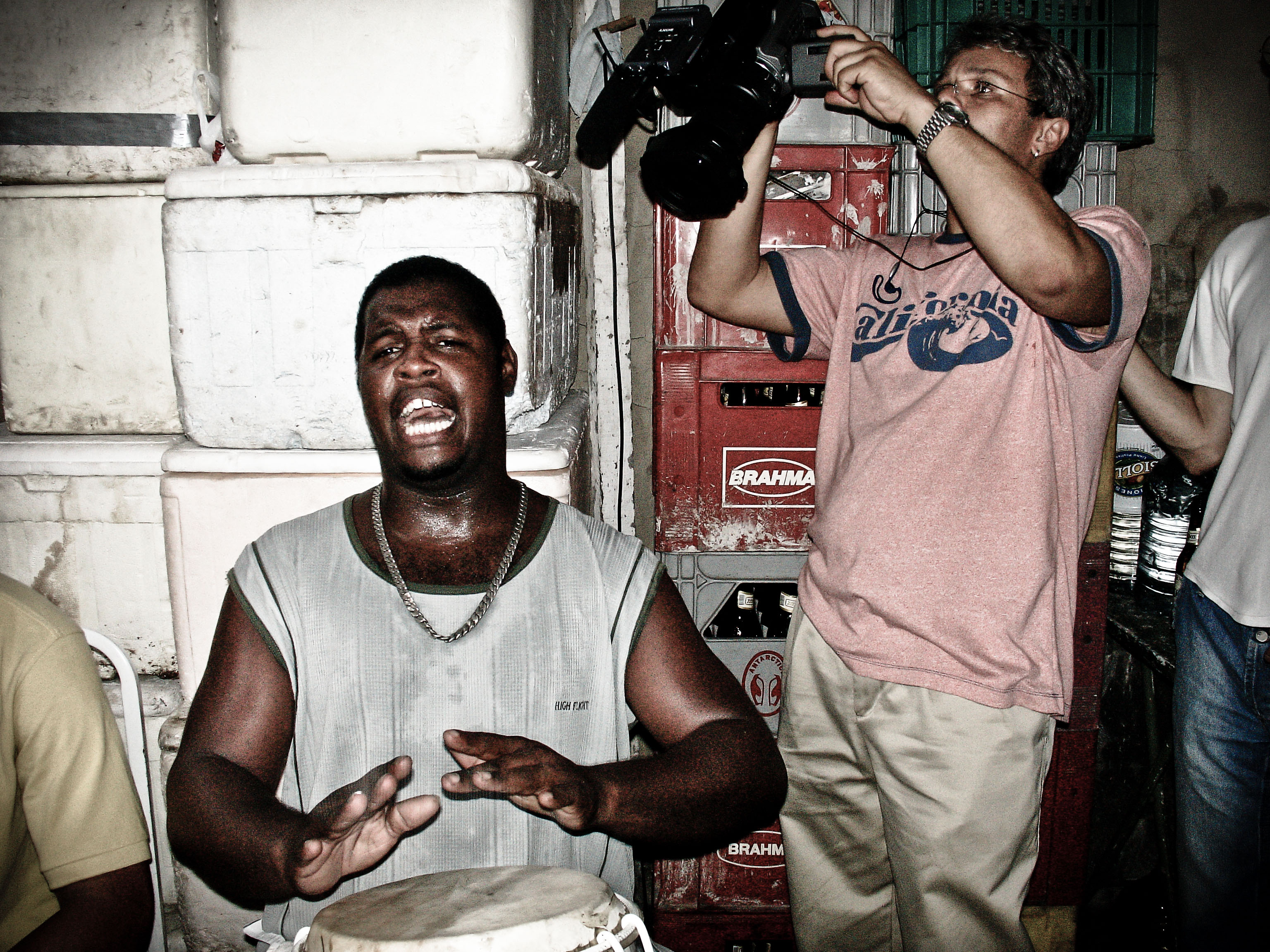
- Directed by: Eduardo Montes-Bradley
- Produced by: Soledad Liendo
- Starring: Paulo Barros; Haroldo Costa; Teresa Cristina; Caetano Veloso; Xangô da Mangueira; Tía Surica; Carlinhos de Jesus; Herminio Bello de Carvalho; Mart'nália
- Cinematography: Mustapha Barat
- Edited by: Eduardo Montes-Bradley
- Production company: Contrakultura Films
- Distributed by: Heritage Film Project
- Release date: 2005
- Running time: 60 minutes
- Countries: United States; Brazil
- Languages: Portuguese; English

Samba On Your Feet is a 2005 documentary film directed by Eduardo Montes-Bradley. The film explores the shared roots of Carnival and Samba in Brazil and examines how these cultural traditions have evolved to form a unique and vibrant aspect of Brazilian culture.

== Synopsis ==
The documentary traces the influences that contributed to shape the music that consecrated Carnival as one of the most powerful cultural manifestations in Brazil. The film begins behind the scenes of Rio de Janeiro's samba schools, where viewers witness the hard work and dedication of choreographers, dancers, musicians, and costume makers coming together in the spirit of teamwork and collaboration to create a spectacle that celebrates the infectious rhythms of samba.

The camera also explores nearby favelas, revealing additional connections between the African diaspora and Brazilian musical traditions. Through interviews and observational footage, the documentary examines how roots and perspectives, flesh and ghosts, entities and divinities spread across the slums and over the sidewalks of Salvador, Bahia, and Rio de Janeiro are essential to the make-up of the Brazilian musical exponent par excellence.

== Production ==
Samba On Your Feet was produced by Contrakultura Films in 2005. The film was directed and produced by Eduardo Montes-Bradley, an Argentine-American filmmaker known for his documentaries exploring Latin American culture and history.

=== Featured subjects ===
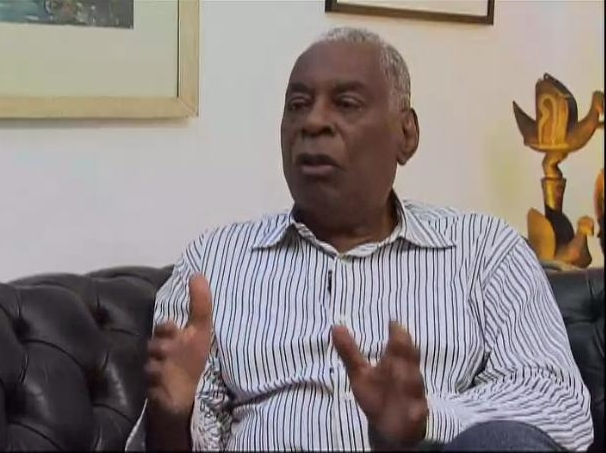
Haroldo Costa - Historian

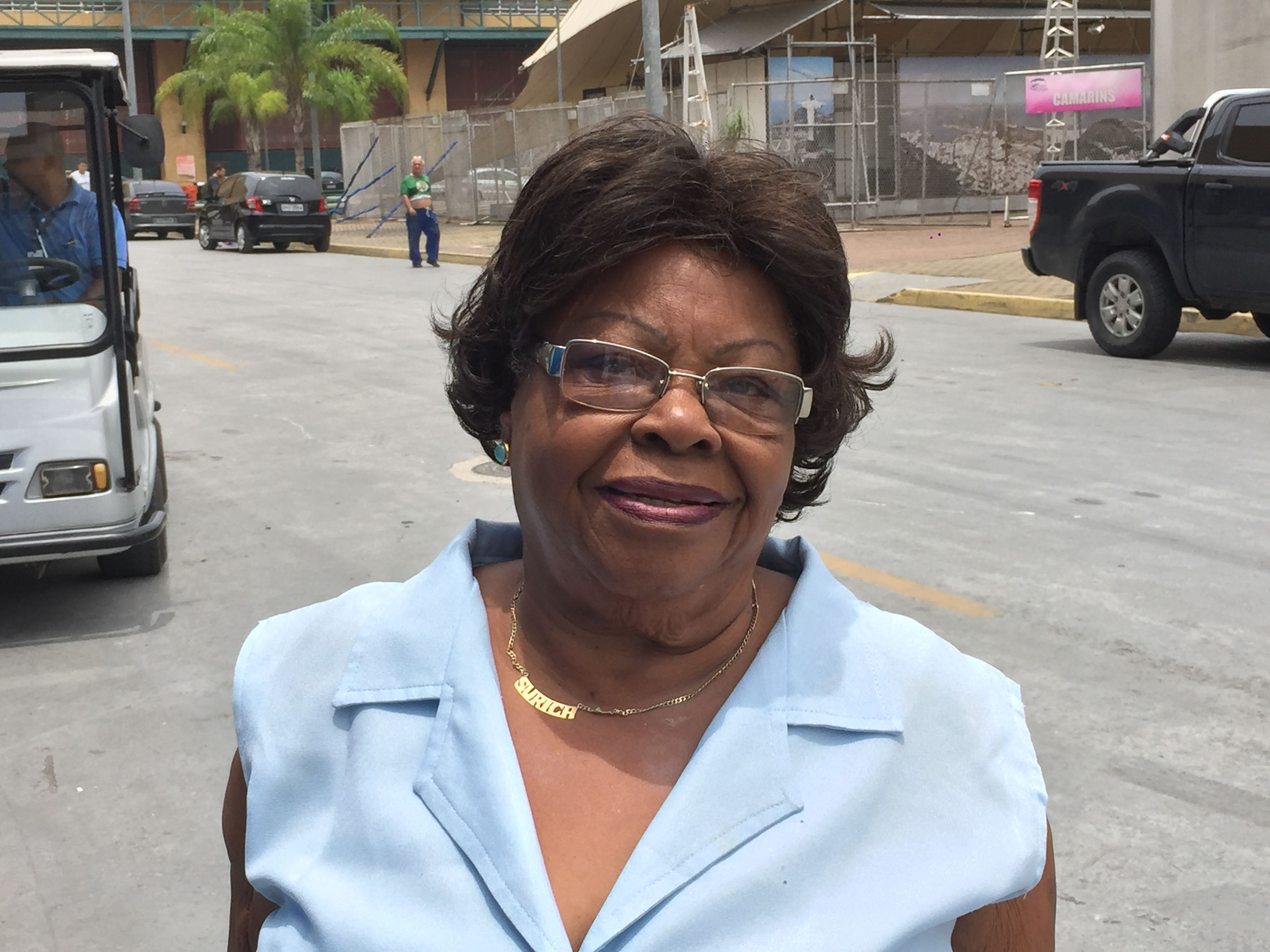
Tia Surica

The documentary features interviews and performances by several notable figures in Brazilian music and carnival culture, including:

- Paulo Barros
- Haroldo Costa
- Teresa Cristina
- Caetano Veloso
- Xangô da Mangueira
- Tía Surica
- Carlinhos de Jesus
- Herminio Bello de Carvalho
- Mart'nália

== Reception and impact ==
The documentary was shown at the Rio International Film Festival, and has received recognition from African American Studies departments in campuses across the United States for its examination of African cultural influences in Brazilian music and carnival traditions.

Rather than focusing on the commercialized or sexualized media portrayals of Carnival, the film presents a more scholarly discourse on how samba affects Brazilian people both past and present, exploring the cultural and historical significance of these traditions.

== Distribution ==
The documentary has been made available through various platforms including:

- Amazon Prime Video
- Vimeo On Demand
- Kanopy (educational streaming platform)
- Physical DVD release

== Themes ==
The film explores several key themes:

- The African diaspora's influence on Brazilian culture
- The socioeconomic aspects of carnival preparation
- The spiritual and cultural significance of samba
- The collaborative nature of carnival production
- The contrast between authentic cultural expression and commercialized representations

== See also ==
- Brazilian Carnival
- Samba
- Eduardo Montes-Bradley
- Rio de Janeiro
- African diaspora
