= Vilma Nascimento =

Brazilian samba performer

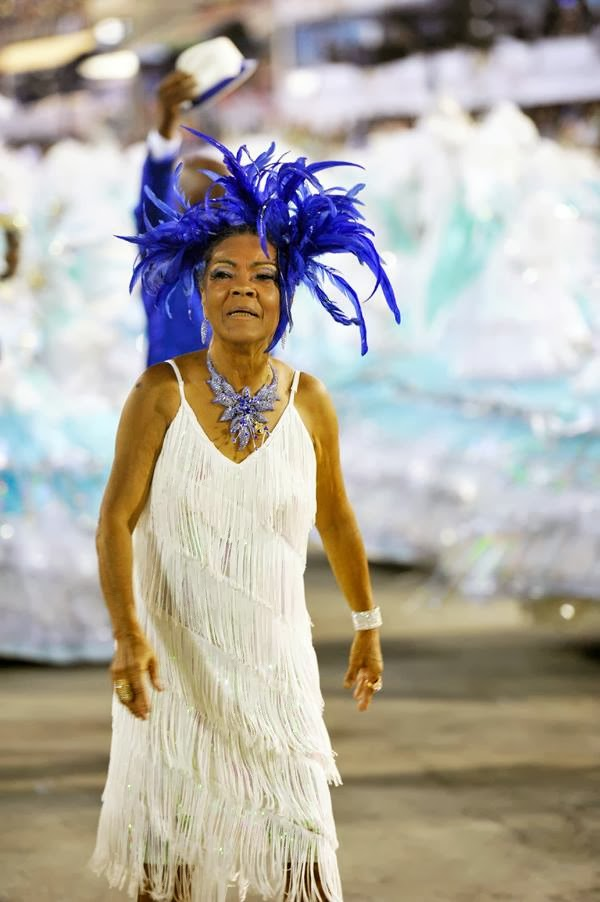
- Nascimento in 2015
- Born: 9 June 1938 (age 87); Rio de Janeiro, Rio de Janeiro state, Brazil
- Occupation: Samba performer
- Known for: Her role as the flag bearer in the Portela Samba school

Vilma Nascimento (born 7 June 1938) is a Brazilian samba performer and the flag bearer for the Portela samba school.

== Biography ==
As a child, Nascimento paraded for the first time in the block Unidos de Dona Clara. She debuted as a flag bearer defending the União de Vaz Lobo, her mother's school. At the time, she was also a dancer at the Night and Day nightclub in Cinelândia. She then started to attract Natal's attention, who invited her to Portela. She refused the first invitations but ended up giving in just before marrying Mazinho, Natal's son. In 1957, she assumed the blue and white flag, replacing Dodô, who became the second flag bearer.

Defended by Nascimento, Portela won four consecutive championships from 1957 to 1960. Journalist Valdinar Ranulfo earned the nickname of Cisne da Passarela due to the elegance with which it changed the style of dance of the flag bearers, who at that time became one of the questions judged in the parade. In 1969, Nascimento passed the post of first flag bearer to Irene and began to parade as a highlight. She resumed the role from 1977 to 1979. In the 1980s, she was part of the group that left school to found Tradição. She only returned to Portela in 2007. In 2009, her daughter Danielle Nascimento also became a flag bearer of Portela.

== Awards and honors ==
Nascimento was honored by Unidos do Porto da Pedra as one of the "Majestades do Samba", theme of the 2014 fashion show. She won the Estandarte de Ouro three times in a row by Portela (1977, 1978 and 1979) and once by Tradição (1989).
