= Guilherme de Brito =

Brazilian singer (1922–2006)

Guilherme de Brito circa 2003

Guilherme de Brito Bollhorst (January 3, 1922 – April 28, 2006), known as Guilherme de Brito, was a Brazilian sambista, singer, songwriter, and painter.

== Biography ==
Guilherme de Brito Bollhorst was born in Vila Isabel, a traditional neighborhood with regard to samba, the home of 12 years older Noel Rosa, with whom he was acquainted and who often gave him rides on his car. Brito was the son of Alfredo Nicolau Bollhorst and Marieta de Brito Bollhorst. Guilherme de Brito got a cavaquinho as a present when he was eight; later he became also a violonista. With the death of his father when he was 12, Brito had to drop his studies and start working. He got a job at old Casa Edson, one of the first recording studios to function in Brazil. His aptitude as an artist arose at an early age; when still a boy, he used to draw with pencils and coal.

Guilherme de Brito met his most important partner, 11 years older Nelson Cavaquinho, when the latter, already famous and known, used to play in the bars of Rio de Janeiro suburbs.

Guilherme de Brito wrote 153 songs, the great majority being sambas, almost all of them in partnership, being 75 with Nelson Cavaquinho. They were recorded by many samba artists besides himself, such as Cartola, Elizeth Cardoso, Paulinho da Viola and especially Beth Carvalho, who had a great reverence for the work of the duo Guilherme de Brito-Nelson Cavaquinho. Some of their most famous songs include "A Flor e O Espinho", "Quando eu me Chamar Saudade", "Pranto de Poeta", "Folhas Secas" and "Minha Festa".

As a painter, Guilherme de Brito has his works exhibited in galleries across Brazil, the United States, Japan and Australia.

== Discography ==
- 2003 - A Flor e o Espinho
- 2001 - Samba Guardado
- 1990 - Folhas Secas
- 1988 - Guilherme de Brito
- 1980 - Guilherme de Brito
