= Wilson Moreira =

Brazilian sambista (1936–2018)

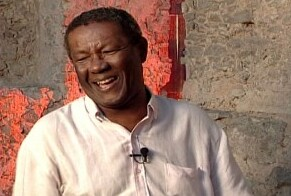
Wilson Moreira

Wilson Moreira (12 December 1936 – 6 September 2018) was a Brazilian sambista.

== Biography ==
Moreira was born in the neighborhood of Realengo, in Rio de Janeiro. As a teenager he was associated with the samba school Mocidade, where he won two samba-enredo contests in 1962 and 1963. In 1968, Wilson became affiliated to samba school Portela.

Wilson had a prolific partnership with sambista Nei Lopes. One of their greatest hits was the song "Senhora Liberdade", which became an anthem in the Brazilian Diretas movement for the institution of direct national elections in the 1980s. Some other famous songs from the duo are "Gotas de Veneno", "Sandália Amarela" and the non-samba "Candongueiro", which brings forward their African roots, with other successes as, e.g., "Meu Apelo", being signed by Wilson alone.

Wilson was a guest on many records, and released quite a few of them. Some of his records were released at first to the Japanese market and then to Brazil, since Wilson is very prominent in Japan. Brazilian virtuoso Raphael Rabello was a big fan of Wilson, and took part in his records Peso na Balança and Okolofé, both of which are considered up to this day some of the best finished samba albums ever.

In March 1997 Wilson Moreira fell victim to a stroke which left him partially immobilized. Fund-raising shows were organized by the samba scene in order to obtain more resources for better treatments to the sambista. Wilson subsequently recovered and released a record, composing sambas in partnerships.

Moreira died on September 6, 2018, at the age of 81.

== Discography ==
With Nei Lopes:

- 1980 - A Arte Negra de Wilson Moreira & Nei Lopes - EMI
- 1985 - O Partido Muito Alto de Wilson Moreira & Nei Lopes - EMI

Individually:

- 1987 - Peso na Balança - Bomba Records
- 1991 - Okolofé - Bomba Records
- 2002 - Entidades I - Rádio MEC
