= Paulinho da Viola =

Brazilian musical artist (born 1942)

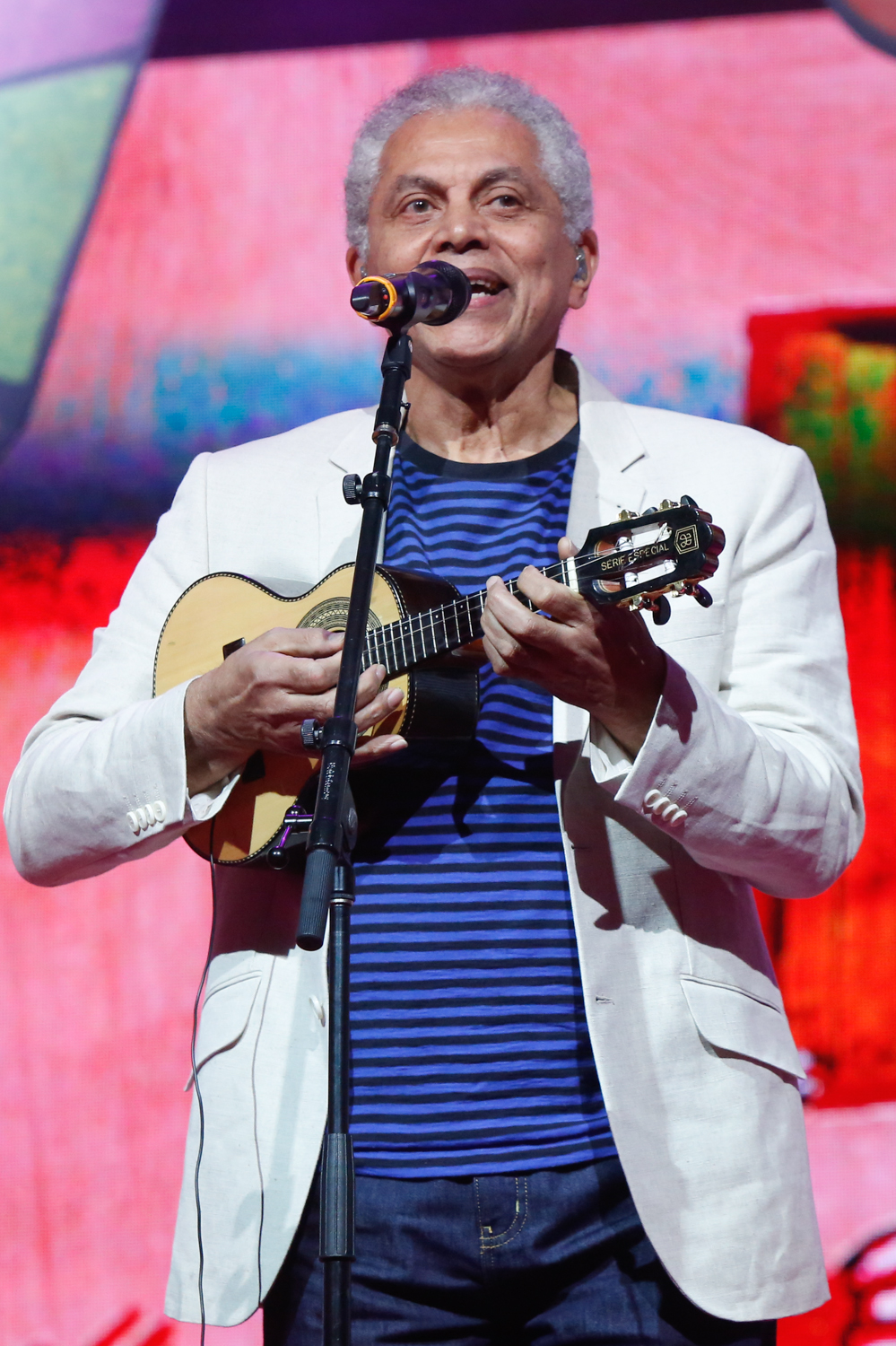
- Paulinho da Viola in 2014

Background information
- Born: Paulo César Batista de Faria; 12 November 1942 (age 83); Rio de Janeiro, Brazil
- Origin: Rio de Janeiro, Brazil
- Genres: Samba; choro
- Occupations: Singer; songwriter
- Instruments: Vocals; guitar; cavaquinho; mandolin; violin
- Years active: 1965–present
- Website: paulinhodaviola.com

Paulinho da Viola (Brazilian Portuguese: [pawˈlĩɲu da viˈɔlɐ]; born Paulo César Batista de Faria, 12 November 1942) is a Brazilian sambista, singer-songwriter, guitar, cavaquinho and mandolin player, known for his sophisticated harmonies and soft, gentle singing voice.

== Biography ==
Paulinho da Viola in Project Six and Meia, held at the João Caetano Theater in Rio de Janeiro, on 27 December 1977. "It is necessary to sing" program. Image of the Fund of the Brazilian Center for Educative TV Foundation.

Born in Rio de Janeiro, Brazil, to a family deeply rooted in the samba tradition, Paulinho met and befriended much of Rio's samba elite as a child. His father César Faria was a guitar player, and musicians such as Pixinguinha and Jacob do Bandolim would often come to his house for rehearsals, which Paulinho watched for hours on end. After the rehearsals, Paulinho would pick up his father's guitar and strum the few chords he knew. Later, as a teenager, he was frequently seen at jams at mandolin master Jacob do Bandolim's house, quietly and attentively observing the older, more experienced musicians. He began writing his own songs as a teenager, but never considered a career as a professional musician until he met poet Hermínio Bello de Carvalho in 1964. By then, Paulinho was working as a teller at a bank in Rio de Janeiro, and recognized Hermínio from the jam sessions at Jacob do Bandolim's house. The two became close friends and soon began writing music together. The first song they wrote together was "Duvide-o-dó", recorded by singer Isaurinha Garcia. He then began performing his own songs at a restaurant in Rio, owned by samba legend Cartola and his wife.

He got his famous nickname in 1965, when he was a member of the samba group A Voz do Morro ("the voice of the hills"), alongside Zé Keti and Oscar Bigode. After their first recording session, a publicist from the record label reportedly told him: "'Paulo César' is not a samba name!", which was true because it is a very common name. Zé Keti and journalist Sérgio Cabral eventually came up with the nickname "Paulinho da Viola" ("Paulie Guitar").

By the 1970s, Paulinho was at the most prolific stage of his career, releasing an average of one album per year. He was already a household name in samba, choro and Música popular brasileira (MPB) circles and broadened his audience by touring all over Brazil and also playing at festivals in Europe and the US. His productivity and popularity had waned by the mid-1980s, when he decided to focus more on his songwriting. In 1996, he regained notoriety after releasing the much-acclaimed album Bebadosamba, in which he once again joined forces with Hermínio Bello de Carvalho and Elton Medeiros, his early songwriting partners.

The peak of success for a samba composer is to have his song picked by one of the largest samba schools (escola de samba) to be performed during the annual Carnival procession in the Rio Sambadrome. Da Viola has earned this distinction numerous times. The melody is supposed to be simple and catchy, the two or three stanzas are supposed to deal with love, longing (saudade), the joys of samba or of the Carnival, and the chorus or refrain is expected to be a memorable crowd-pleaser that will be sung for weeks on the streets of the city. Unlike in Trinidad, for example, political commentary is not expected to be part of a traditional samba composition. From this standpoint, Da Viola is truly a traditionalist in that his compositions have always stayed away from social commentary. However, other samba stars such as Martinho da Vila, who is four years older, and Chico Buarque, who is two years younger and the son of white intellectuals, have added biting political and social commentary to their compositions. Perhaps due to his mild social stance, beautiful melodies and gentle personality, Da Viola is probably the most beloved composer of traditional samba music in the second half of the 20th century.

A 2003 documentary called Meu Tempo é Hoje (My Time is Now) depicted his personal and public lives, including his relationship with his native Rio de Janeiro and its samba community. "The film depicts, both with enthusiasm and restraint, the life of a true prince," wrote Brazilian journalist and critic José Nêummane in a review.

Paulinho Da Viola still lives in Rio de Janeiro and performs around Brazil.

Da Viola was selected to perform a slow rendition of the Brazilian National Anthem during the Rio de Janeiro Olympics in 2016.

== Discography ==
- 1965 – Rosa de Ouro
- 1965 – Roda de Samba, Conjunto "A voz do morro"
- 1966 – Roda de Samba Vol.2
- 1967 – Rosa de Ouro Vol.2
- 1968 – Os Sambistas, conjunto "A voz do morro"
- 1968 – Samba na Madrugada, Paulinho da Viola and Elton Medeiros
- 1968 – Paulinho da Viola
- 1970 – Foi Um Rio Que Passou em Minha Vida
- 1971 – Paulinho da Viola
- 1971 – Paulinho da Viola
- 1972 – Dança da Solidão
- 1973 – Nervos de Aço
- 1975 – Paulinho da Viola, also known as "Amor à Natureza"
- 1976 – Memórias Chorando
- 1976 – Memórias Cantando
- 1978 – Paulinho da Viola
- 1979 – Zumbido
- 1981 – Paulinho da Viola
- 1982 – A Toda Hora Rola Uma estória
- 1983 – Prisma Luminoso
- 1989 – Eu canto Samba
- 1993 – Paulinho da Viola (International)
- 1996 – Bebadosamba
- 1997 – Bebadachama (Live)
- 1999 – Sinal Aberto com Toquinho
- 2003 – Meu tempo é Hoje (Soundtrack)
- 2007 – Acústico MTV (MTV Unplugged)

== Latin Grammy nominations and wins ==
2008	Result
Best Samba/Pagode Album – MTV Unplugged	Won^{1}
2021	Result
Best Samba/Pagode Album – Sempre Se Pode Sonhar	Won

^{1} Tied with Maria Rita for Samba Meu
