= Dona =

Dona may refer to:

- Feminine form for don (honorific) (Spanish: doña, Portuguese: dona; Italian: donna), a Spanish, Portuguese, southern Italian, and Filipino title, given as a mark of respect
- Feminine form for dom (title), titled nobility in Portugal and Brazil, and in English for certain Benedictine and Carthusian monks

== People ==
- Dona Ivone Lara (1921–2018), Brazilian singer
- Dona Neuma (1922–2000), Brazilian samba dancer
- Francesco Donà (1468–1553), Doge
- Francisco Donaire (born 1982), Spanish beach soccer goalkeeper better known as Dona
- Leonardo Donà (1536–1612), Doge
- Nicolò Donà (died 1618), Doge
- it:Pietro Donà (1390–1447), bishop of Padua, chair of Council of Basel

== Other ==
- "Dona", a song by Kaliopi, representing Macedonia in the Eurovision Song Contest 2016
- "Dona", a 1985 song by Roupa Nova
- "Dona, Dona", a 1941 song written by Sholom Secunda and Aaron Zeitlin; popularized by Joan Baez in 1960
- Doña Blanca, a white grape
- Dona, a cornmeal mush
- Dona, another name for Pamana Island in Indonesia

== See also ==
- La Doña (disambiguation)
- Doña Ana (disambiguation)
- Donka (disambiguation)
- Donna (disambiguation)
- Doona (disambiguation)
