= Dona Zica =

Brazilian samba dancer

- Born: Euzébia Silva de Oliveira; February 6, 1913; Piedade, Rio de Janeiro, Brazil
- Died: January 22, 2003 (aged 89); Rio de Janeiro, Brazil
- Other names: Euzébia Silva do Nascimento
- Occupation: Samba dancer
- Known for: Her role in the Mangueira Samba school
- Spouses: Carlos Dias do Nascimento; Agenor de Oliveira
- Children: Six (one adopted)

Euzébia Silva de Oliveira, better known as Dona Zica (6 February 1913 – 22 January 2003), was a Brazilian samba dancer at the Mangueira Samba school in Rio de Janeiro, who went on to play an important role in the Mangueira favela.

== Early life ==
Dona Zica was born in Piedade in the north of Rio de Janeiro on 6 February 1913. Her father died when she was one year old. She moved with her family to Mangueira as a child, where she became one of the first members of the Mangueira Samba school, participating in its first parade, in 1928, when she was 15. She first married at the age 19, to Carlos Dias do Nascimento, a footballer, and they had six children, one of whom was adopted. Dona Zica was widowed after 20 years of marriage. Having previously worked as a cloth weaver, she then worked as a dishwasher, a kitchen assistant and, finally, a cook at a club known as the Clube Bola Preta.

== Marriage to "Cartola" ==
in October 1964, Zica married the samba dancer, composer and songwriter, Cartola (Agenor de Oliveira), one of the founders of the Mangueira School. They had lived together for a decade before marrying and Zica was responsible for persuading Cartola to return to the Mangueira favela, to overcome his alcoholism, and to start composing again. A photo of the couple leaning out of a window appears on the cover of his second album. One of Cartola's most beautiful compositions, the samba, "We two", was composed for their wedding, and Zica inspired several more of his songs, performing in one or two on Cartola's records.

Shortly before they married, the couple opened the Zicartola bar and restaurant on Rua da Carioca, in the centre of Rio de Janeiro. This quickly became a meeting point for Rio's working class samba performers, as well as middle-class Bossa nova musicians such as Vinicius de Moraes. Cartola was in charge of the music and provided a space for older samba musicians such as Nelson Cavaquinho, Ismael Silva, Paulinho da Viola and Zé Kéti to perform, while also encouraging the new generation. Zicartola also became a centre of cultural resistance after the 1964 Brazilian coup d'état. Dona Zica was a skilled cook but despite its popularity the couple's lack of management skills meant the bar and restaurant made little profit and they closed it down in 1965.

== Return to Mangueira ==
With Cartola's death in 1980, Dona Zica became a leader in the Mangueira favela. Moving back to Mangueira after having lived with Cartola in Jacarepaguá, her house became a kind of guest house, hospital and community centre. In 1996–97, she participated as a guest artist in Xica da Silva, a television soap opera. Together with Dona Neuma (daughter of Saturnino Gançalves, one of the founders of the Samba school), she coordinated the making of costumes for the school and was active in a group of former performers, known as the "Old Guard of Mangueira".

== Publications ==
- A biography of Dona Zica, by Odacy de Brito Silva, was published in 2001.
- D. Zica - Tempero, Amor E Arte is a book of Dona Zica's recipes that includes stories from her life. It was written by her granddaughter, Nilcemar Nogueira, and by Sergio Cabral. The book was published a few days after Dona Zica's death.

== Death ==
Dona Zica died on 22 January 2003 in Mangueira. About a thousand people attended the funeral ceremony. The burial took place at the São Francisco Xavier Cemetery, in the north of Rio de Janeiro, to the sound of Exaltação à Mangueira the anthem of the association of which she had been a member since its foundation on 28 April 1928.
