= Clementina de Jesus =

Brazilian samba singer

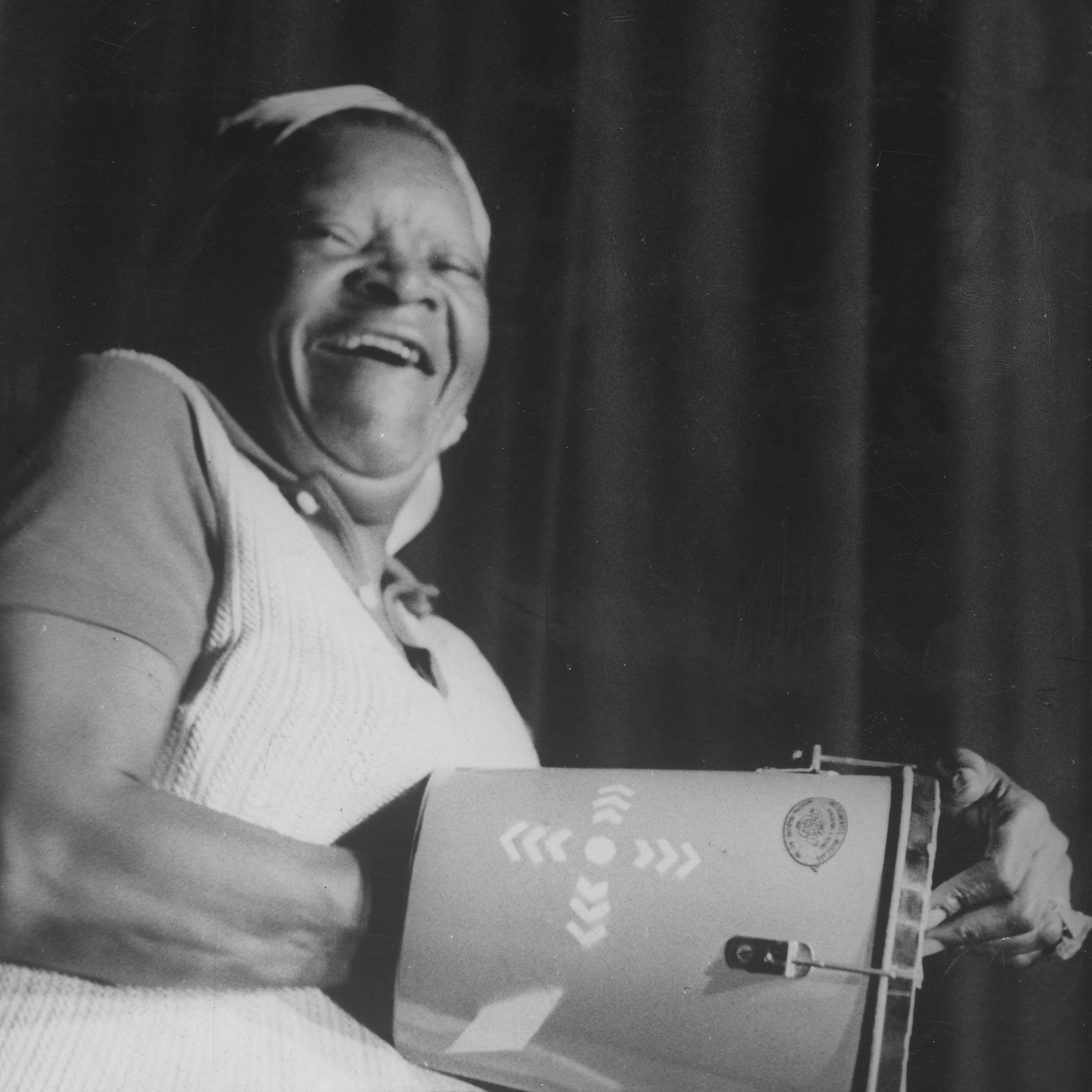

Background information
- Born: Clementina de Jesus da Silva; February 7, 1901
- Origin: Valença, Rio de Janeiro, Brazil
- Died: July 19, 1987 (aged 86)
- Genres: Samba
- Occupation: Singer
- Instrument: Vocals
- Years active: 1963–1987

Clementina de Jesus (February 7, 1901 – July 19, 1987) was a Brazilian samba singer.

== Biography ==
Clementina de Jesus, 1976. National Archives of Brazil.

Born in Carambita, a district on the outskirts of Valença, south of Rio de Janeiro, she moved with her family when she was eight years old to the district Osvaldo Cruz, in Rio de Janeiro. For many years she followed the Portela Samba School; in 1940, after her marriage, she moved to the Mangueira Samba School.

For more than 20 years she worked as a maid, but in 1963 was discovered by the composer Hermínio Bello de Carvalho, who asked her to participate in the Rosa de Ouro show in some Brazilian capitals and he made her first record with Odeon Records.

She was celebrated by Elton Medeiros with the song "Clementina, Cadê Você?" and by Clara Nunes with "PCJ, Partido Clementina de Jesus" in 1977, written by the composer Candeia.

In 1983 she was celebrated by many artists, including Paulinho da Viola, João Nogueira and Elizeth Cardoso, with a show at the Municipal Theatre of Rio de Janeiro.

She began her professional career when she was 63 and her distinctive voice can be heard on four solo albums, as well as other recordings with well-known samba artists such as Pixinguinha and João da Bahiana. She was known in Brazil as "Mom". Despite having had a short career that started late in her life, Clementina de Jesus is one of the most popular singers in Brazil, known for her contribution to carnival music and for her identification with the poor.

She died aged 86 in Rio de Janeiro from a stroke on July 19, 1987.

== Discography ==
Her only record that can be found today in stores is Clementina e convidados.

=== LP ===
- 1966 – Clementina de Jesus (Odeon MOFB 3463)
- 1970 – Clementina, cadê você? (MIS 013)
- 1973 – Marinheiro Só (Odeon SMOFB 3087)
- 1976 – Clementina de Jesus – convidado especial: Carlos Cachaça (EMI-Odeon SMOFB 3899)
- 1979 – Clementina e convidados (EMI-Odeon 064 422846)

=== With others ===
- 1965 – Rosa de Ouro – Clementina de Jesus, Araci Cortes e Conjunto Rosa de Ouro (Odeon MOFB 3430)
- 1967 – Rosa de Ouro nº 2 – Clementina de Jesus, Araci Cortes e Conjunto Rosa de Ouro (Odeon MOFB 3494)
- 1968 – Gente da Antiga – Pixinguinha, Clementina de Jesus e João da Baiana (Odeon MOFB 3527)
- 1968 – Mudando de Conversa – Cyro Monteiro, Nora Ney, Clementina de Jesus e Conjunto Rosa de Ouro (Odeon MOFB 3534)
- 1968 – Fala Mangueira! – Carlos Cachaça, Cartola, Clementina de Jesus, Nélson Cavaquinho e Odete Amaral (Odeon MOFB 3568)
- 1982 – O Canto dos Escravos – Clementina de Jesus, Tia Doca e Geraldo Filme – Canto dos Escravos (Vissungos) da Região de Diamantina – MG. Memória Eldorado.

=== Compilation ===
- 1999 – Raízes do Samba – Clementina de Jesus (EMI 522659-2)
