= Nelson Sargento =

Brazilian samba musician (1924–2021)

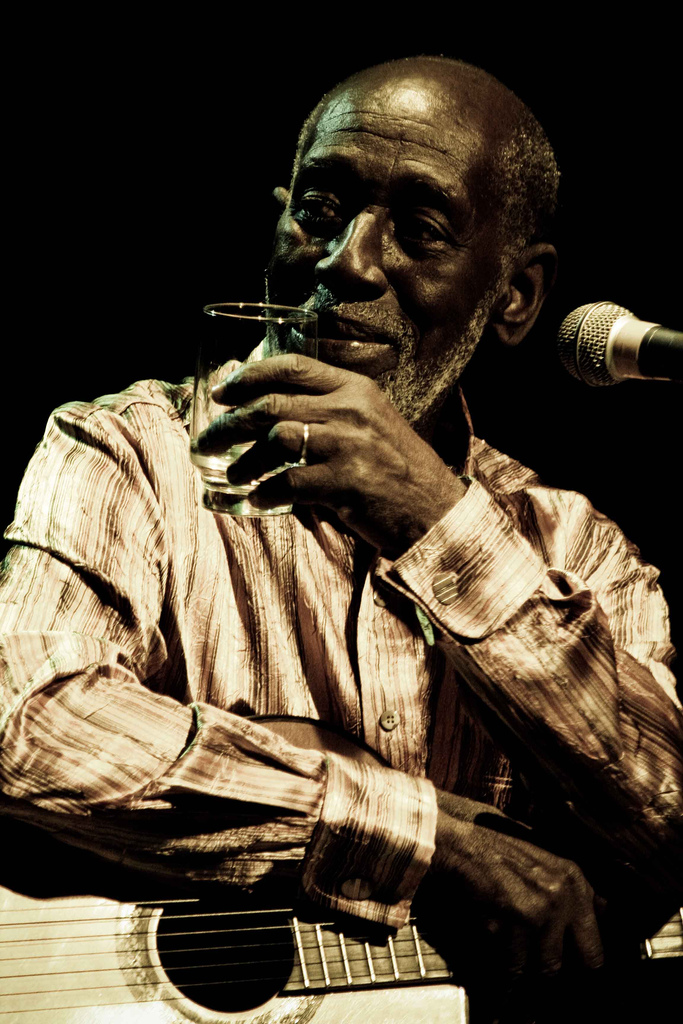
- Born: 25 July 1924; Rio de Janeiro, Brazil
- Died: 27 May 2021 (aged 96); Rio de Janeiro, Brazil
- Occupation: samba musician

Nelson Sargento (born Nelson Mattos) OMC (25 July 1924 – 27 May 2021) was a Brazilian composer, singer, Brazilian popular music researcher, visual artist, actor, and writer.

Having lived in Mangueira since the age of 12, Nelson became known as one of the most important samba musicians of Estação Primeira de Mangueira, of which he was a member and president of the school's composers' wing, as well as its honorary president.

His artistic nickname "Sargento" alluded to the rank he attained for having served in the Brazilian Army in the second half of the 1940s. He gained notability as a singer at the famed Zicartola lounge and, shortly thereafter, as a member of the ensembles A Voz do Morro and Os Cinco Crioulos in the 1960s. But it was only in 1979, at the age of 55, that the composer recorded his first solo album. Throughout his life, the sambista composed more than 400 compositions.

In addition to his musical career, Nelson was a painter and poet, having published the books "Prisioneiro do Mundo" and "Um certo Geraldo Pereira."[1][2] He also made appearances in the films "O Primeiro Dia" and "Orfeu", and was the subject of the documentary "Nelson Sargento da Mangueira."

== Biography ==
He was born on 25 July 1924, to Rosa Maria da Conceição, a maid and cook, and Olímpio José de Mattos, a cook. While living with his mother in Tijuca, Nelson had little relation with his father Olimpio who died of gangrene while Nelson was still young; a pan of hot water fell on his foot in a restaurant kitchen and, left untreated, he died.

His mother left her domestic worker job to live in the Salgueiro favela, in a rented shack. To support herself, she began washing the clothes of several families. Nelson would then deliver the washed clothes to the nearby neighbourhood of Tijuca. It was there, in the favela of Salgueiro, that Nelson, then ten years old, learned about samba, marching with and playing tambourine in the "Azul e Branco" school. There were two other schools there: "Unidos do Salgueiro" and "Depois eu Digo". José Casemiro, (known as Calça Larga), a leader in the favela, united them all, thus creating Acadêmicos do Salgueiro.

Shortly after, Nelson and his mother moved into the home of her partner Alfredo Lourenço, an important composer for the Estação Primeira de Mangueira samba school, located in the neighborhood of Mangueira.

== Musical career ==
Encouraged by Alfredo Lourenço, Nelson became a musician as a teenager. In the 1949 Carnaval, he won the Mangueira's samba-enredo competition selection with "Apologia ao mestre" (in partnership with Alfredo Lourenço), and the samba school became the champion of that year's parade. The partnership between stepson and stepfather led to the samba-enredo "Plano SALTE - Saúde, Lavoura, Transporte e Educação" (Health, farming, transportation and education), which guaranteed another championship for the school.

In 1955, Nelson and Alfredo Lourenço composed the samba-enredo "As quatro estações do ano ou Cântico à natureza" (The four seasons of the year or Hymn to nature), considered one of the most beautiful ever performed. Three years later, Nelson was elected president of Mangueira's composers' wing,[2] a position that allowed him more contact with the school's veteran sambistas, especially Cartola, of whom he would become a disciple occasionally completing some of his compositions.

Between 1964 and 1965, at Zicartola, Cartola and Dona Zica's famed samba lounge, Nelson began to perform as a singer and composer, establishing himself as a performer in Rio's urban samba scene. Soon after, Nelson was invited to participate in the musical show "Rosa de Ouro" alongside Paulinho da Viola, Elton Medeiros, Jair do Cavaquinho and Anescarz. Alongside these and other sambistas, Nelson joined some ensembles that defined samba of the era, such as A Voz do Morro and Os Cinco Crioulos.

Gradually, some of his compositions began to be recorded by artists such as Paulinho da Viola, who released "Minha Vez de Sorrir" in 1971 and "Falso Moralista" in 1972, two of Nelson's best-known sambas. In 1978, Beth Carvalho released "Agoniza Mas Não Morre", which became Nelson's most successful composition.

The commercial success of "Agoniza Mas Não Morre" allowed Nelson to finally record, at the age of 55, his first solo album, "Sonho de Sambista", released in 1979. The work presented, besides "Agoniza Mas Não Morre", other of his well-known compositions, such as "Falso Moralista", "Falso Amor Sincero", "Minha Vez de Sorrir" and "Cântico à Natureza".

Nevertheless, the LP did launch a singing career for Nelson. The sambista recorded his second studio album, "Encanto da paisagem," only in 1986 and largely thanks to the efforts of a Japanese producer Katsunori Tanaka.

In 1990, Nelson released his third LP, "Inéditas de Nelson Sargento", and in 1998, he participated in the live album "Só Cartola" alongside Elton Medeiros and the group Galo Preto.[1] His last two works were the albums "Flores em Vida" and "Versátil", released in 2001 and 2008 respectively. Throughout his career, the sambista was the author of more than 400 compositions, many of which were composed on the same guitar that he hastily bought, second-hand, so that he could be part of the "Rosas de Ouro" show.

Besides his recognition as a sambista, Nelson was also a visual artist and poet. After painting the apartment of journalist Sérgio Cabral, the sambista was encouraged to exhibit seven paintings from his abstract phase in 1973. He also had 14 works exhibited at Espaço Favela in the 2019 edition of the Rock in Rio festival. As a writer, he released the books Prisoner of the World, in 1994, and Pensamentos, in 2005. He also participated in films such as "O Primeiro Dia" by Walter Salles and Daniela Thomas, "Orfeu" by Cacá Diegues, and was the subject of the documentary "Nelson Sargento da Mangueira" by Estevão Ciavatta.

== Personal life and death ==
Nelson Sargento was married to Evonete Belizario Mattos. The couple raised a total of nine children, six biological - Fernando, José Geraldo, Marcos, Léo, Ricardo and Ronaldo - and three more adopted - Rosemere, Rosemar and Rosana.

In addition to his love for Mangueira, Nelson was a fan of the Vasco da Gama soccer club.

He was awarded the Ordem do Mérito Cultural in 2016.

In May 2021, the sambista was admitted to the National Cancer Institute - a facility he had attended since 2005 when he received treatment for prostate cancer[3] - with dehydration and rapid weight loss, in addition to testing positive for COVID-19, despite Nelson having taken both doses of the CoronaVac vaccine between January and February of the same year. The composer's medical condition worsened until he died on 27 May 2021, at the age of 96.

== Works ==
Discography

Solo career

- 1979 – Sonho de um sambista
- 1986 – Encanto da paisagem
- 1990 – Ineditas de Nelson Sargento
- 2001 – Flores em vida
- 2008 – Versatil

As a member of Conjunto Rosa de Ouro

- 1965 – Rosa de ouro
- 1966 – Os sambistas

As a member of Conjunto Os Cinco Crioulos

- 1967 – Samba...no duro
- 1968 – Samba...no duro 2
- 1969 – Os Cinco Crioulos
