= Dona Neuma =

Brazilian samba dancer (1922–2000)

- Born: Neuma Gonçalves da Silva; 8 May 1922; Madureira, Rio de Janeiro, RJ, Brazil
- Died: 17 July 2000 (aged 78); Méier, Rio de Janeiro, RJ, Brazil
- Occupation: Samba dancer
- Years active: 1928–2000
- Children: 4

Neuma Gonçalves da Silva (8 May 1922 – 17 July 2000) was a Brazilian samba dancer. She began dancing samba in a small group at age seven and was president of the Mangueira samba school for multiple terms, establishing the institution's children's and female's wings. Neuma housed several temporarily homeless people, and took some students to her home to learn to read and write through a literacy programme featuring local swear words invented by her. She was a member of the Superior Council of the Samba Schools throughout the 1960s and performed on four albums. A 2001 song about Neuma was written by the composer Arlindo Cruz and an overpass and school were named after her.

== Early life ==
On 8 May 1922, Neuma was born in a favelas suburb of Madureira, Rio de Janeiro, RJ, Brazil. She was the oldest daughter in a poor family, and grew up in Madureira. Neuma's father Saturnino Gonçalves co-founded the traditional samba school Bloco dos Arengueiros in 1928, which later became the Estação Primeira de Mangueira. She became interested in music as a child, learning samba, and performed in the annual parade as a dancer for the school from age seven in a bloco (small group). In 1938, Neuma and other girls formed multiple groups raising flags for contributions when Mangueira's participation in an annual carnival parade was put at risk by a needleperson who refused to give over a new flag she embroidered for the parade from having a lack of money for payment.

== Career ==
To earn a living income, Neuma began washing clothes after she was not allowed to take up employment in factory because she was black. In the 1950s, Neuma learnt of a school in Madureira that had a substantial default rate and brought some students to her shack made of brick-and-wood to learn to read and write through a literacy programme featuring local swear words that she invented. Neuma took part in the Superior Council of the Samba Schools during the 1960s, discussing the organisation of Rio de Janeiro schools. She was president for several terms of the Mangueira samba school and established the children's and female's "women's department" wing. Neuma housed many temporarily homeless people and did not turn a single person away, fostering 23 children alongside her four biological children, with her husband, a carpenter.

Neuma regularly sought carpenters and sculptors who constructed floats and the designers and seamstresses that created the costumes for the annual carnival celebration. She said she would not attend the 1993 carnival in protest over the school's administration but subsequently relented. Throughout her life, the pre-Lenten dance and song celebrations evolved from "simply presented, purely community-based celebrations of Afro-Brazilian culture to the fiercely competitive, flashy, televised spectacles of today's Carnival." When samba evolved to a commercialised art form, Neuma questioned whether it would "still capture with frivolity the ferocity of existence, as it did when the Mangueira samba school was starting out." Individuals such as Chico Buarque, Ricardo Cravo Albin, Pedro Ernesto Baptista, Antônio Carlos Jobim, Negrão de Lima, Heitor Villa-Lobos and Noel Rosa frequented her home.

She recorded the track Brasil, terra adorada with Cartola and Carlos Cachaça on their LP Cartola entre amigos in 1984. In 1998, Neuma appeared on the album Chico Buarque de Mangueira in celebration of the Mangueira samba school and performed a single track on the 1999 CD album Velha Guarda da Mangueira e convidados. In 2000, she was a primary collaborator on the album Mangueira – sambas de terreiro e outros sambas, performing on five tracks. Neuma is a 1998 recipient of the Ordem do Mérito Cultural.

== Death and funeral ==
Neuma was admitted to the intensive care unit of the Hospital Municipal Salgado Filho in Méier, northern Rio de Janeiro, with a hemorrhagic stroke caused by dizziness and fainting at home on 6 July 2000. She died eleven days later, on the afternoon of 17 July despite surgery to remove a clot in her brain. Neuma's funeral took place at Caju Cemetery on the morning of the following day, with neighbours beating drums and Rio de Janeiro singers performing traditional samba songs until early in the morning; her wish of not holding the funeral at the samba centre was respected because "it was a place of joy and celebration, not sadness".

== Personality and legacy ==
She was known as "Dona Neuma de Mangueira" following a visit of Maria Thereza Goulart to the Mangueira samba school during the presidency of her husband João Goulart. According to Encyclopædia Britannica, she was "an influential behind-the-scenes leader of Mangueira and was credited with having helped popularize samba as a musical form." In 2001, the composer Arlindo Cruz made a song Primeira Dama da Mangueira for the album A paixão tem memória to commemorate Neuma. In January 2003, an overpass between the Marechal Rondon and Visconde de Niterói streets in Mangueira was named after her. The Escola Tia Neuma 2 school on the Vila Olímpica da Mangueira for children aged between 6 and 14 opened in 2008 was named for her.
