= Doona =

Doona may refer to:

- Doona (plant), a genus of flowering plants endemic to Sri Lanka
- Duvet, referred to as a doona in Australian English
- Doona!, 2023 South Korean romance television series
- Doona, book series published between 1969 and 1994 by science fiction author Anne McCaffrey
- Bae Doona (born 1979), South Korean actress and photographer
- Dan Doona (fl. 1990s–2000s), Irish footballer
- James Doona (born 1998), Irish footballer

== See also ==
- Dona (disambiguation)
- Donna (disambiguation)
- Duna (disambiguation)
