= Duna =

Duna is the Hungarian name for the Danube River.

Other places with the name Duna include:

- D'Una River, Brazil
- Duna (woreda), Hadiya Zone, Ethiopia
- Duna, Iran (disambiguation), places in Iran
- 23617 Duna, main-belt asteroid discovered in 1996

Duna may also refer to:

- Duna TV, Hungarian television station
- Duna World, Hungarian television station and sister channel of Duna TV
- Duna or Dyna, the Viking name, or Düna, the German name for the Daugava (river) (flowing through Russia, Belarus, and Latvia)
- Duna (band), Soviet band of the late 1980s
- Duna Records, American record label founded by Brant Bjork
- Fiat Duna, small car produced in Brazil
- Duna language, spoken in Papua New Guinea
- Duna people, indigenous people living in Papua New Guinea

People with the given name or surname Duna include:

- Steffi Duna, Hungarian actress

== See also ==
- Doona (disambiguation)
- Duna, name for a Mars analog in the game Kerbal Space Program
