= Donna =

Donna may refer to the short form of the honorific nobildonna, the female form of Don (honorific) in Italian.

== People ==
- Donna (given name); includes name origin and list of people and characters with the name

== Places ==
- Donna, Texas, United States
- Dønna (island), an island in Dønna Municipality in Nordland county, Norway
- Dønna Municipality, a municipality in Nordland county, Norway
- Donna (crater), a tiny lunar crater on the near side of the Moon

== Music ==
- The Donnas, American all-girl rock band
- Donna (radio station), former Flemish music radio station located in Belgium
- Donna (album), album by Donna Cruz
- "Donna" (Ritchie Valens song), a 1958 song by Ritchie Valens, covered in the United Kingdom by Marty Wilde
- "Donna" (10cc song), a 1972 song by 10cc
- "Donna", song from Hair
- "Donna", song by Wally Lewis
- "Donna, Donna", a Yiddish song
- "Donna the Prima Donna", a 1963 song by Dion

== Other ==
- Hurricane Donna, Category 4 Atlantic hurricane in 1960
- Una donna, 1906 novel by Sibilla Aleramo
- Doona, in Australian English a generic trademark for a duvet or quilt, after the first local manufacturer
- Aunty Donna, an Australian comedy group

== See also ==
- Doona (disambiguation)
