= Jamelão =

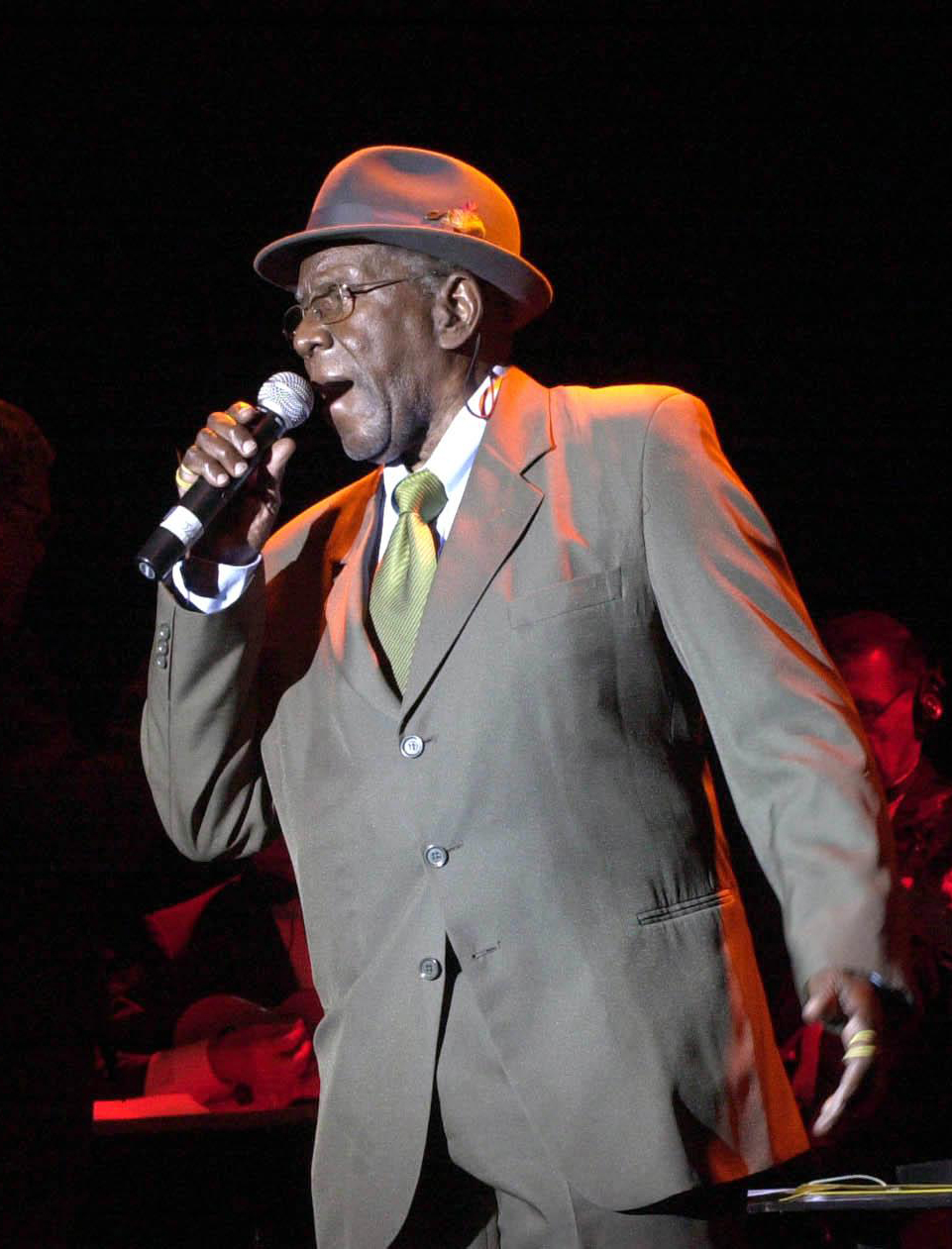

Background information
- Also known as: Jamelão
- Born: José Bispo Clementino dos Santos; May 12, 1913; Rio de Janeiro, Brazil
- Died: June 14, 2008 (aged 95) Rio de Janeiro, Brazil
- Genres: Samba
- Occupations: Singer, songwriter
- Instrument: Singer
- Years active: 1930–2008

José Bispo Clementino dos Santos (May 12, 1913 – June 14, 2008) was a Brazilian samba singer known as Jamelão (Portuguese pronunciation: [ʒameˈlɐ̃w]). He began in music as a tamborim player, but later became known as the official singer at samba school Mangueira's carnival parades, performing in every Carnival from 1949 to 2006. He also toured Europe as a solo performer.

He's considered to be the best singer of Lupicinio Rodrigues songs. He recorded in 1972 the album Jamelão Interpreta Lupicinio.

He died on June 14, 2008, of multiple organ failure.
