= Nelson Cavaquinho =

Brazilian composer and singer of samba

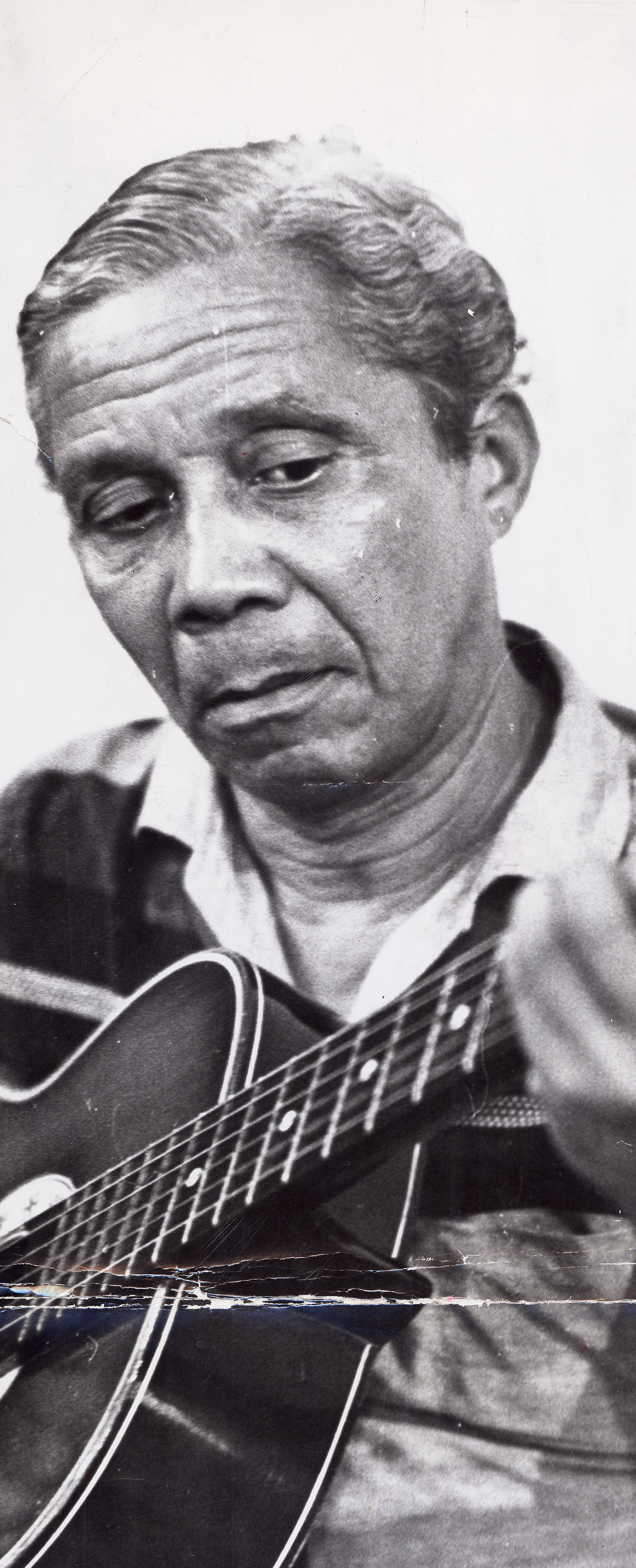

Background information
- Born: Nelson Antônio da Silva; October 29, 1911; Rio de Janeiro, Brazil
- Died: February 18, 1986 (aged 74) Rio de Janeiro, Brazil
- Genres: Samba
- Occupations: Singer, composer
- Instrument: Cavaquinho

Nelson Antônio da Silva (October 29, 1911 – February 18, 1986), better known by his stage name Nelson Cavaquinho, was one of the most important singers/composers of samba. He is usually seen as a representative of the tragic aspects of samba thematics, with many songs about death and hopelessness. He was a prominent figure of samba school Estação Primeira de Mangueira.

== Biography ==
Nelson was born in Rio de Janeiro. Coming from a poor family, he quit school at a young age to seek employment in a factory. He showed a musical talent at a young age playing a home-made guitar made of a cigar box and wires. When he could, he would borrow a cavaquinho and try and copy the techniques of professional cavaquinho players. He demonstrated a great ability to play the instrument and composed a choro ("Caminhando") which gained him notoriety as a musician (due in part to an uncommon modulation which made it hard for other instrumentalists to harmonize with it). He was finally given a cavaquinho and having demonstrated a unique playing style on the instrument was given the nickname "Nelson Cavaquinho". He demonstrated a unique style of playing with only two fingers.

As a young man he became acquainted with famous samba players like Cartola, Carlos Cachaça and Zé da Zilda. He went on to compose over 600 compositions, with Guilherme de Brito as his main partner. Some of his better-known works include "A Flor e o Espinho", "Folhas Secas", "O Bem e o Mal" and "Juízo Final".

He died of emphysema on February 18, 1986, at the age of 74, in Rio de Janeiro.
