= Lupicínio Rodrigues =

Brazilian singer and composer

Lupicínio Rodrigues (Porto Alegre, September 16, 1914 – Porto Alegre, August 27, 1974) was a Brazilian singer and composer from Rio Grande do Sul. He was a prominent exponent of the samba-canção genre. He dubbed his own style, dor-de-cotovelo (literally "elbow pain"), inspired by his experiences with heartbreak. His compositions have been performed and recorded by many musicians, including Jamelão, who recorded two albums exclusively devoted to his compositions. Rodrigues is also famous for having written the anthem of Grêmio.

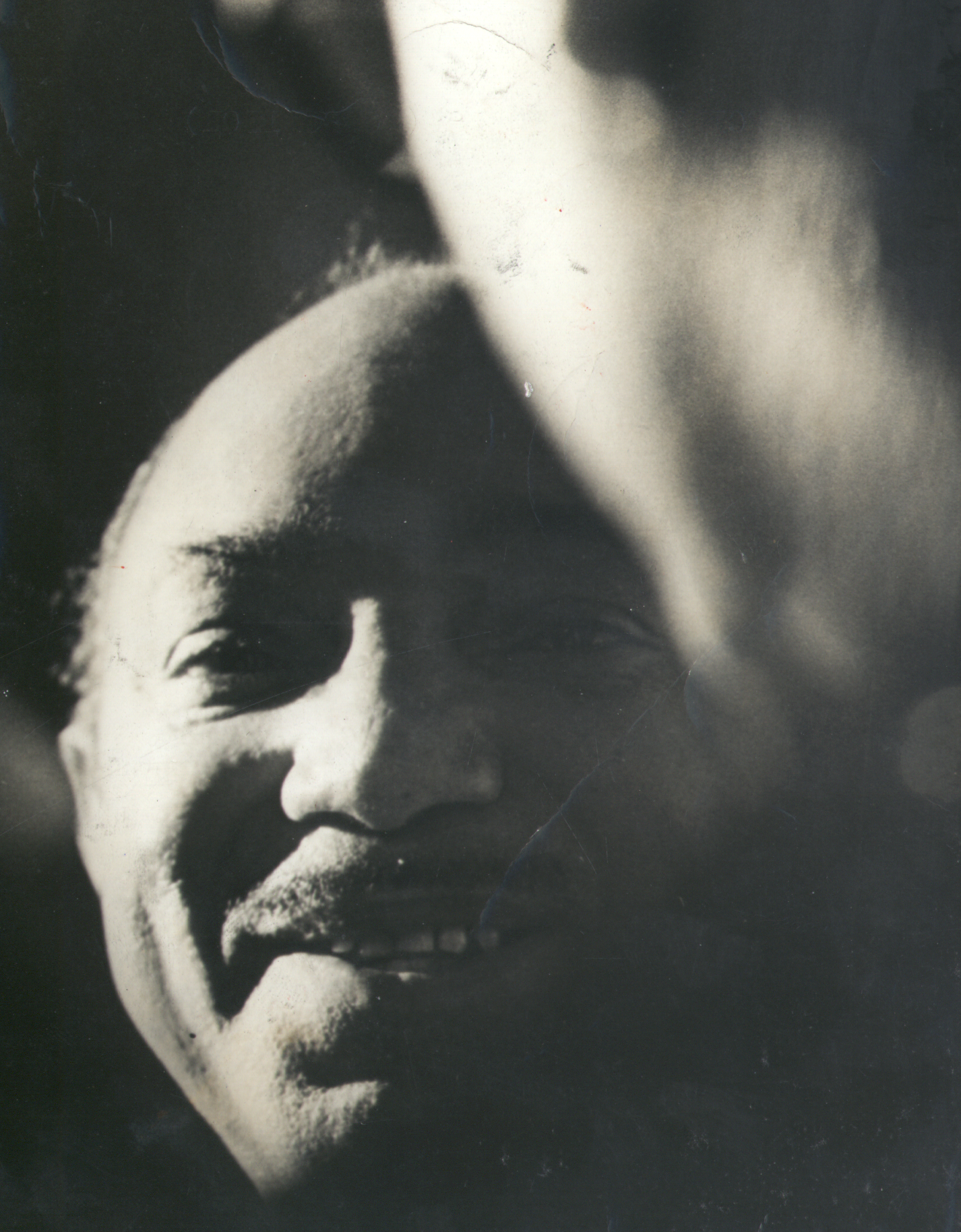
Lupicínio Rodrigues (1968)

== Selected compositions ==
Some of his most recorded compositions are:

- Hino do Grêmio (Grêmio Anthem)
- Vingança (Revenge) - Linda Baptista, Elza Soares, Arnaldo Antunes, Arrigo Barnabé;
- Felicidade (Happiness) - Caetano Veloso, Zezé Di Camargo & Luciano;
- Cadeira Vazia (Empty Chair) - Elis Regina, Nelson Gonçalves, Francisco Alves, Jamelão;
- Nervos de aço (Nerves of Steel) - Adriana Calcanhotto, Francisco Alves, Fábio Jr., Paulinho da viola, Gal Costa, Marisa Monte, Jamelão;
- Ela disse-me assim (She Told me That) - Adriana Calcanhotto, Gonzaguinha, Nelson Gonçalves, Simone;
- Esses moços (Those Lads) (sometimes also credited as Esses Moços (pobres moços) (Those Lads (Unhappy Lads)) - Adriana Calcanhotto, Fábio Jr., Francisco Alvez, Gilberto Gil, Nelson Gonçalves, Jamelão.

== Tribute ==
On 16 September 2019, Google celebrated his 105th birthday with a Google Doodle.
