= Cartola =

Brazilian composer (1908–1980)

Cartola OMC
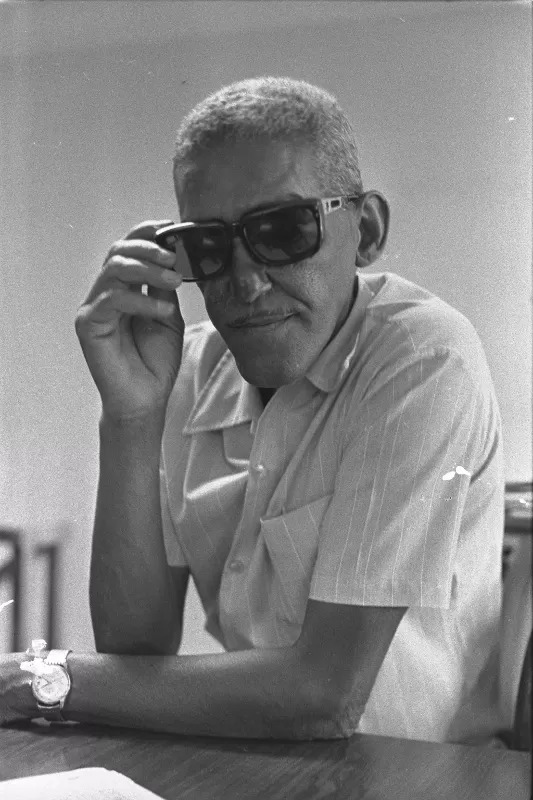
- Cartola in 1971

Background information
- Also known as: Cartola; Divino; Poeta das Rosas
- Born: Angenor de Oliveira; October 11, 1908; Rio de Janeiro, Federal District, Brazil
- Origin: Catete, Rio de Janeiro, Republic of Brazil
- Died: November 30, 1980 (aged 72) Rio de Janeiro, Rio de Janeiro, Brazil
- Genre: Samba
- Occupations: Singer; songwriter
- Instruments: Vocals; guitar
- Years active: 1927–1980
- Labels: Discos Marcus Pereira; RCA Victor
- Spouse(s): Deolária, Donária, Dona Zica

Angenor de Oliveira, known as Cartola (Portuguese for top hat), (Portuguese pronunciation: [kaʁˈtɔlɐ]; October 11, 1908 – November 30, 1980) was a Brazilian singer, composer and poet considered to be a major figure in the development of samba. Cartola got his name from the hat which he used to protect his hair while laying cement in his younger years as a brick layer. He helped to start the Estação primeira da Mangueira samba school in 1928. His work was popular throughout the 30s, he disappeared from the samba scene in the 40s until 1956. In 1964, together with his wife Zica, he opened a restaurant called Zicartola which featured live samba. In 1974 he began to record solo albums and in 1978 held his first solo live performance at age 70.

Cartola composed, alone or with partners, more than 500 songs.

== Biography ==
Angenor de Oliveira was born in 1908 in the Catete neighborhood, in the city of Rio de Janeiro. He was the oldest of eight children of the couple Sebastião Joaquim de Oliveira and Aída Gomes de Oliveira. Although he was given the name Agenor, he was registered as Angenor - a fact that he would only discover many years later, when he was preparing the papers for his marriage to Dona Zica in the 1960s. In order not to have to arrange for a name change at the notary, from then on he officially signed his name as Angenor de Oliveira.

His maternal family was from Campos dos Goytacazes, and his ancestors were slaves of the first Baron of Carapebus. His maternal grandfather, Luís Cipriano Gomes, a famous cook, worked in Macaé, until he was recruited and sent to Rio de Janeiro to serve the President Nilo Peçanha at the Catete Palace.

As a child he watched his own father play the guitar and cavaquinho. When he was eight years old, his family moved to Laranjeiras, where he came into contact with the carnival ranches "União da Aliança" and "Arrepiados" - in the latter he played the cavaquinho, a musical instrument given to him by his father when he was only 8 or 9 years old, which he also did in the Epiphany parades. He was so enthusiastic about the "Arrepiados" that later, when he participated in the foundation of the samba school Estação Primeira de Mangueira, he suggested that the colors of this ranch - green and pink - be the same as those of the nascent organization, which would become one of the most revered symbols in the world of samba. On the other hand, Carlos Cachaça, another founder of Mangueira, said that there had been an old ranch on Mangueira hill called Caçadores da Floresta, which colors were exactly green and pink.

In 1919, driven by financial difficulties, the Oliveiras moved to Mangueira, then a small, growing favela with less than fifty shacks. Soon, another resident of Mangueira, Carlos Cachaça, six years older than Cartola, would become, besides a lifelong friend, his most constant partner in dozens of sambas.

When he was 15, he abandoned his studies in the fourth grade to work, while at the same time leaning toward the bohemian life. As a teenager, he worked as a printer apprentice, but soon became a bricklayer. While working in construction sites he earned the nickname with which he would become recognized as one of the great names in Brazilian popular music. To keep the cement from falling on his hair, he decided to wear a bowler hat, which his colleagues said looked more like a small top hat, and thus he began to be called "Cartola" (top hat, in portuguese).

He was 17 when his mother died. Soon after, the growing conflicts with his father, an enemy of his bohemian life, led him to be expelled from home. He led a life of vagrancy for some time, drinking and dating, frequenting prostitution houses and contracting venereal diseases, roaming the nights and sleeping in suburban trains. These habits led him to become physically weak, sick and malnourished in the bed of a small shack. A neighbor from his shack, named Deolinda, who was seven years older, married, and had a two-year-old daughter, took care of him and the two ended up getting involved. He was only 18 at the time they decided to live together and Deolinda left her husband, keeping their daughter, whom the composer would raise as his own.

Cartola became popular in the 1930s, recording many sambas, but prestige didn't translate into financial reward; to support his growing family, he worked as a bricklayer, fishmonger and cheese-seller, and his wife occasionally worked as a cook.

In 1940 Cartola and Paulo de Portela started hosting a radio program called "The Voice of the Hill" ("A Voz do Morro" in Portuguese) it was broadcast on the radio station Cruzeiro do Sul. On the show, they presented songs which had yet to be named and gave the public the opportunity to name them.

By the late 1940s, things had become worse. At 38, Cartola had a long illness, and shortly after he recovered, his wife died from heart problems. One of his greatest hits, sung by many artists, "Sim (Yes)", was written during his grief. Cartola stopped playing and composing; he moved with his new wife, Donária, into a slum in Nilópolis, where he worked as a handyman.

In 1952, he met and fell in love with Dona Zica, with whom he spent the rest of his life, and who persuaded him to return to music. In 1956, while working as a car-washer in Ipanema, he was rediscovered by the journalist Sérgio Porto, who brought him back to the music world. Porto publicized Cartola's return, inviting him to radio shows and promoting his work with new partners. However, samba's popularity had waned, so he again worked in several other jobs.

In 1963, eager to bring the favelas' samba to a broader audience, Cartola — with Zica and Eugênio Agostine — opened the famous Zicartola bar and restaurant in downtown Rio de Janeiro; it became the most important samba establishment of that time, providing a link between the traditional sambistas and the incipient Bossa Nova movement. Cartola invited people such as Nélson Cavaquinho, Pixinguinha, Nara Leão, Paulinho da Viola, and Zé Keti to sing the "low-value" music, as sambistas ironically referred to their work.

Cartola's commercial success started in the late 1960s and early 1970s, when he became quite popular and a lot of samba classics were released, such as "O Sol Nascerá", "O Mundo é Um Moinho", "As Rosas não Falam", "Corra e Olhe o Céu", and "Quem me vê Sorrindo", with support from singers Elizeth Cardoso, Clara Nunes, Paulinho da Viola and especially Beth Carvalho. He released his first record at age 66, in 1974; although he had financial difficulties, he composed and sang until his death, at age 72.

Cartola died in the Humaitá clinic, located in the south zone of Rio De Janeiro. The complications which led to his death were caused by a cancer of the stomach; a viewing was held at the quadra Verde-e-Rosa which is the headquarters of the samba school Estação Primeira de Mangueira. His casket was covered with the flag of the Estação Primeira and that of the Fluminense football club. He was buried in the Cemetério do Cajú.

== Impact ==
The 2007 documentary film "Música Para os Olhos", directed by Lírio Ferreira and Hilton Lacerda, is a profile of the life of Cartola.

A biography of Cartola, Divino Cartola – Uma Vida em Verde e Rosa, by Denilson Monteiro, was published in January 2013.

Cartola and Zica appeared briefly in the 1959 film Black Orpheus as a couple at the city hall when the main characters register to get married.

In 2022 the Estação Primeira da Mangueira paid tribute to Cartola along with two other carnaval icons in the Samba-enredo “Angenor, josé and Laurindo”.

In 2023, the Fluminense football club released a special jersey to honor Cartola; who was a lifetime fan of the team. Marking the third time that the team has released a jersey in his honor. The green and pink styling was chosen to represent Cartola's connection with the Estação Primeira de Mangueira school of samba. The jersey also featured lyrics from the song "Corra e olha o céu", written by Cartola and Dalmo Castello. The lyrics were printed on the jersey in Cartola's own handwriting.

In October of 2023 Google released a Google doodle honoring Cartola, it was featured on Google in Mexico, Brazil, Chile, Uruguay, Argentina, Peru and Ireland. It gave a biography of his life and impact.

== Work ==
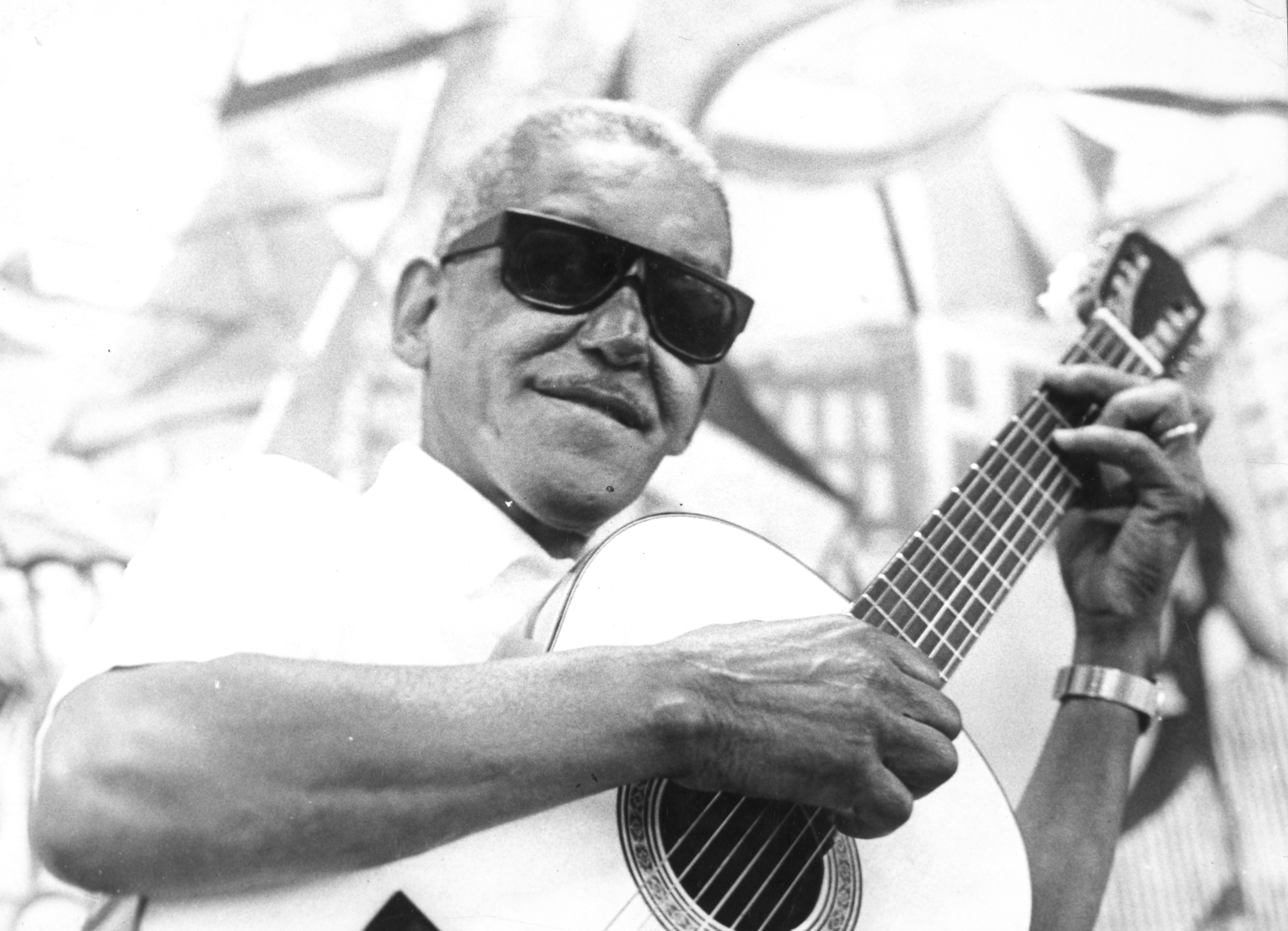
Cartola, 1970.

Cartola composed melodies, harmonies, and lyrics. His lyrics are notable for their very correct use of Portuguese, especially considering his lack of formal higher education. His poetry binds in an effective manner elegance and emotion, while keeping a relatively low level of complexity, which made his work accessible to larger layers of the population.

With regard to tempo, Cartola's music had a strong tendency towards calmer, slower sambas in contrast to the faster, brisker sambas de terreiro seen in samba schools and to other composers' music. Some say his sambas had a tendency towards samba-canção. The cavaquinhos in his records had a certain choro mood, which was less percussive than usual, with the exception of his last records where Alceu Maia was the cavaquinist.

As a musician, Cartola made use of many modulations, some of which were not common in samba at that time. Some of his modulating tunes are "Quem me vê Sorrindo" and "Sim" (I -> V), "Aconteceu" and "Amor Proibido" (I -> bVI), "Inverno do Meu Tempo" (I -> bIII) and "A Cor da Esperança" (I -> bII). Furthermore, he made use of non-trivial figures such as tritone substitutions and extensive tritone resolutions to the IIIm7, as can be observed, e.g., in "Alvorada", "Inverno do Meu Tempo" and "Disfarça e Chora".

== Discography ==
=== Albums ===
- 1974 – Cartola
- 1976 – Cartola II
- 1977 – Verde Que Te Quero Rosa
- 1978 – Cartola 70 Anos
- 1982 – Cartola - Ao Vivo
- 1982 – Cartola - Documento Inédito

=== Contributor ===
- 1942 – "Native Brazilian Music" – Leopold Stokowski
- 1967 – "A Enluarada Elizeth" – Elizeth Cardoso ("Seleção de Sambas da Mangueira")
- 1968 – "Fala Mangueira!" – Odete Amaral, Cartola, Clementina de Jesus, Nelson Cavaquinho, Carlos Cachaça
- 1970 – "História da música popular brasileira" – with Nelson Cavaquinho
- 1974 – "História das escolas de samba: Mangueira" -Various
- 1975 – "MPB – 100 ao vivo" -Various
- 1980 – "E Vamos À Luta" – Alcione ("Eu Sei")
- 1993 – "No Tom da Mangueira" – Tom Jobim e Velha Guarda da Mangueira (including his recording of "Não quero mais amar a ninguém")

=== Tributes ===
- 1984 – "Cartola, Entre Amigos" – Various
- 1987 – "Cartola – 80 Anos" – by Leny Andrade
- 1988 – "Cartola – Bate outra vez..." – Various
- 1995 – "Claudia Telles Interpreta Nelson Cavaquinho e Cartola" – by Claudia Telles
- 1998 – "Sambas de Cartola" – Grupo Arranco
- 1998 – "Só Cartola" – by Élton Medeiros and Nelson Sargento
- 1998 – "Cartola – 90 Anos" – by Élton Medeiros and Márcia
- 2002 – "Cartola" – by Ney Matogrosso
- 2003 – "Beth Carvalho canta Cartola" – by Beth Carvalho
- 2008 – "Viva Cartola! 100 Anos" – Various

== See also ==
- Afro-Brazilian
- Samba
