= Doña Ana =

Doña Ana may refer to:

- Doña Ana County, New Mexico
- Doña Ana, New Mexico, a city in the above county
- Dona Ana Bridge in Mozambique

== See also ==
- Don (honorific), for information on the titles "don" and "doña"
