= La Doña =

La Doña may refer to:

- Doña, the female form of the honorific Don
- La Doña (2011 TV series), a 2011 Chilean telenovela
- La Doña (2016 TV series), a 2016 American telenovela
- La Doña (album), by Teena Marie
- María Félix (1914–2002), Mexican actress
- María Félix: La Doña, a 2022 Mexican TV series
- La Doña (artist), a California-based performer
