= Dan Doona =

Irish Gaelic footballer

Personal information
- Born: Beaufort, County Kerry

Sport
- Sport: Gaelic football
- Position: Full Forward
Clubs
- Years: Club
- 1990s–2000s: Beaufort; Kerry New York; Leitrim New York
Inter-county
- Years: County
- 2005 2006-: Kerry; New York
Inter-county titles
- Munster titles: 0
- All-Irelands: 0
- NFL: 0

Dan Doona is a Gaelic footballer from Beaufort, County Kerry. He currently is a member for the New York county team and has been captain of the team since 2010. He played for Kerry at all levels winning Munster Minor Football Championship medals in 2002 and 2003.

In 2008 he was liked with a move to join up with Mick O'Dwyer's Wicklow but stayed in New York.

At club level he played with Beaufort & Mid Kerry before moving to New York. He won 2 Kerry Minor Football Championship medals with Mid Kerry in 2002 and 2003. In New York he has played with both the Kerry and Leitrim teams, winning Championships with both (2006 with Kerry and 2010 and 2011 with Leitrim).
