= Wally Lewis (singer) =

American singer-songwriter

Wally Lewis (born in Bakersfield, California, United States) is an American country-rockabilly singer and songwriter. His best known tune "Kathleen" reached number 15 on the U.S. pop chart in 1957.

== Discography ==
=== Singles ===
- "Kathleen" (W. Lewis, Stewart) / "Donna" (W. Lewis), 1958
- "White Bobby Socks" (Bonnie Owens) / "I'm With You" (W. Lewis), 1958
- "Every Day" (W. Lewis) / "That's The Way It Goes" (W. Lewis), 1959
- "Sally Green" (Wally Lewis, Buddy Mize) / "Arms Of Jo-Ann" (W. Lewis), 1959
- "Lover Boy" (Wally Lewis) / "My Baby Walks All Over Me" (Billy Mize), 1959
- "Streets Of Berlin" (Owens, Lewis) / "Walking In The Footsteps Of A Fool" (Keller, Greenfield), 1961

=== Songs for other artists ===
- "Is This the Beginning of the End?" (Wally Lewis, Billy Mize, Wynn Stewart) – The Legend of Bonnie & Clyde - Merle Haggard
