= Estação Primeira de Mangueira =

Samba school in Rio de Janeiro, Brazil

Coordinates: 22.90362°S 43.24050°W

Mangueira
- Full name: Grêmio Recreativo Escola de Samba Estação Primeira de Mangueira
- Nickname(s): Verde e Rosa (English: green and pink); Estação Primeira (English: First station)
- Foundation: April 28, 1928; 98 years ago
- Colors
- Symbol: Repique with a crown above, and laurel wreath below
- Location: Mangueira
- President: Elias Riche
Carnival staff
- Carnival producer: Leandro Vieira (carnival planner)
- Carnival singer: Marquinho Art'Samba
- Carnival director: Conselho de Carnaval
- Harmony director: Edinho
- Director of Battery: Mestre Wesley
- Queen of Battery: Evelyn Bastos
- Mestre-sala and Porta-Bandeira: Matheus Olivério; Squel Jorgea
- Choreography: Priscilla Mota; Rodrigo Negri

2020 presentation
- Tier: Special group (1st tier)
- Result: 1st (champion)

Website
- mangueira.com.br

Grêmio Recreativo Escola de Samba Estação Primeira de Mangueira, or simply Mangueira, is a samba school in Rio de Janeiro, Brazil. The school was founded on April 28, 1928, by Carlos Cachaça, Cartola, Zé Espinguela, among others. It is located in the Mangueira neighborhood, near the neighborhood of Maracanã.

Mangueira is one of the most traditional samba schools in Brazil. It has won the Rio de Janeiro Carnaval competition 20 times, second only to Portela (samba school) (with 22 victories). It has been runner up another 20 times.

== History ==
=== Early years ===
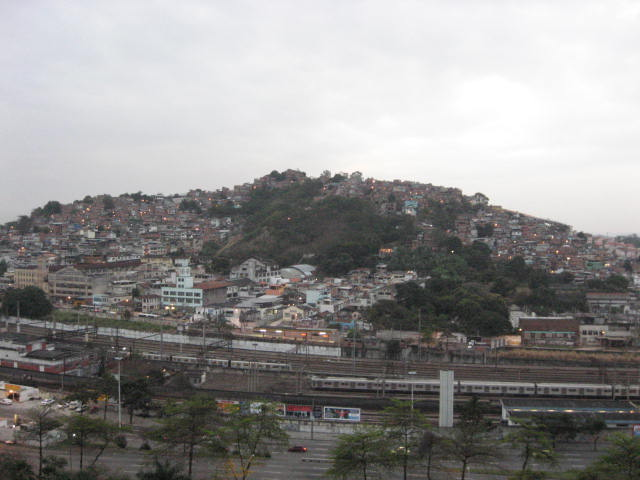
Morro da Mangueira in 2008.

In the early days of samba, the community around the Mangueira hill or morro emerged as a pioneer of the Rio Carnival through its 'Cordões', in which a group of masked participants were led by a teacher with a whistle followed by a veritable percussion orchestra. In Mangueira, there were at least two Cordões: the Mountain Warriors (Guerreiros da Montanha) and the Triumphs of Mangueira (Triunfos da Mangueira). Later came the ranchos (pt:Rancho carnavalesco), which introduced several very important concepts to the Carnival procession: the participation of women, floats, a theme to connect the procession, and the use of woodwind, brass, and string instrumentation (particularly plucked strings). They also added two special dancers, now known as master of ceremonies (mestre-sala) and flagbearer (porta-bandeira). Three ranches stood out in Mangueira: Drop of Love (Pingo de Amor), Pearl of Egypt (Pérola do Egito) and Princes of the Forest (Príncipes da Mata). By 1920 the 'carnival blocks' with elements taken from both the Cordão and Ranch traditions, along with the now familiar percussion block, debuted. These were a strong influence on the development of the other samba schools.

There were no lack of blocks in the Mangueira area. In just the Buraco Quente neighborhood, one could find the Tia Fé, Tia Tomázia and Mestre Candinho blocks. Most famous of all was the Bloco dos Arengueiros. It was Cartola, aged 19, who felt it was time to channel the natural gifts of the blocks' rogues and thus to show them in a more organized light, displaying the power and choreographic legacy of their African roots.

Then, on April 28, 1928, at a meeting at Travessa, Saião Lobato, aged 21, the arengueiros Zé Espinguela, "Seu" Euclides, Saturnino Gonçalves (father of Dona Neuma), Massu, Cartola, Pedro Cain and Abelardo Bolinha founded the First Station Block (Bloco Estação Primeira) - regarded as a predecessor to the present day carnival blocks and samba schools. This block was present at the first contest between samba dancers in the house of Zé Espinguela in 1929, one of the forerunners of the samba schools, along with Deixa Falar and Portela.

=== Samba School ===
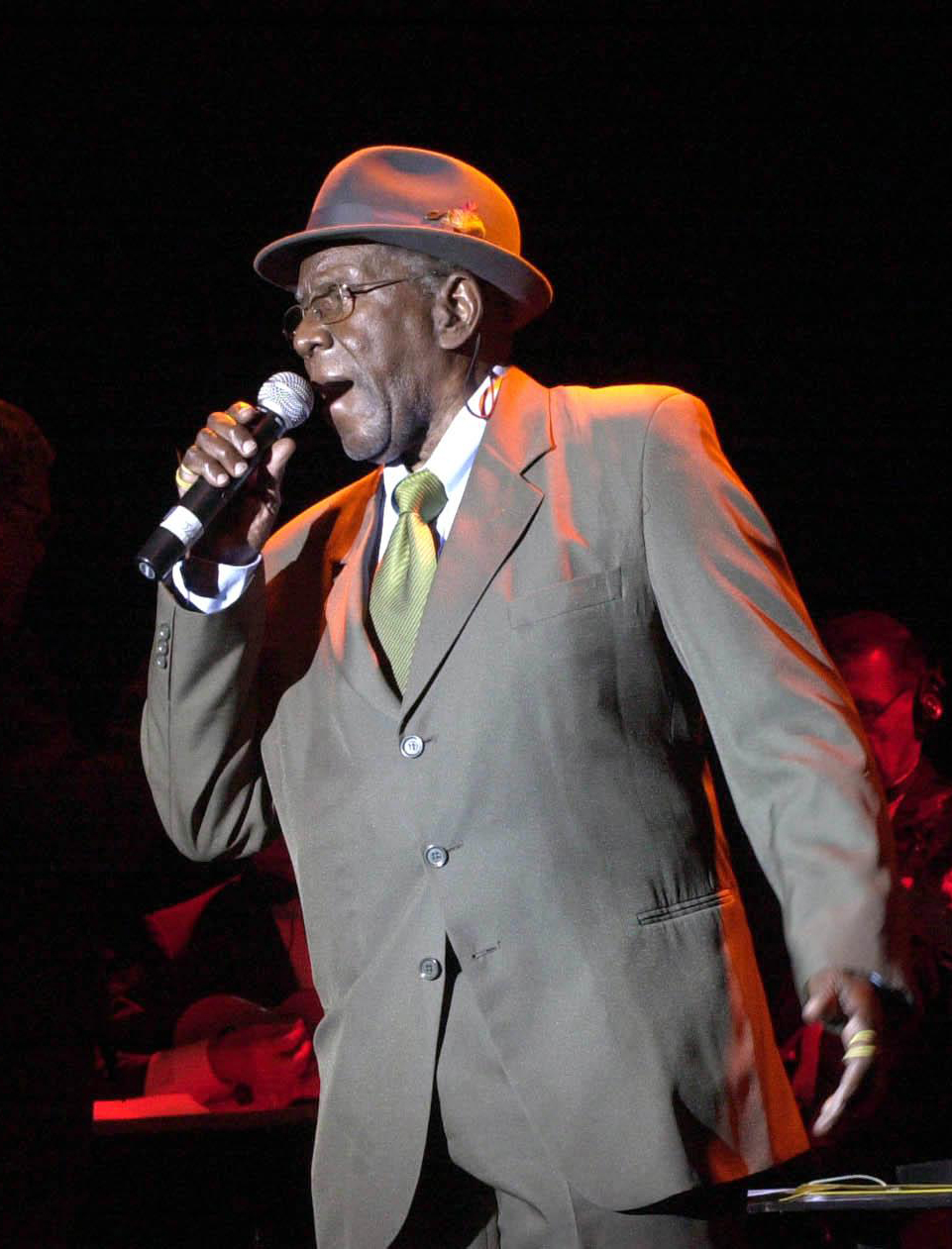
Jamelão, Mangueira's singer for 57 years

Cartola, who later married Dona Zica, was the first bandmaster and musical director of the school and gave the final word on the choice of the name and colors: "Estação Primeira (First Station)" - because it was the first railway stop from the Brazil Central Railway Station where there was samba; the green and pink colors as a tribute to a ranch that existed in Laranjeiras, the Arrepiados. Gradually all other blocks of the hill merged their associations to it and by the 1930s and 40s, Mangueira was already included in the list of "major" samba schools of the city.

Mangueira was the first samba school that created a composers' wing, and the first to maintain, since its foundation, a unique beat of the surdo leading in the school percussion section. On the symbol of the school, the surdo represents the samba, the laurels are the victories won as the general champion, the crown is the imperial district of São Cristóvão, and the stars, the years it won the Carnival championship. It was also the first one to develop a "front commission", or Comissao da Frente as it is called in Portuguese and an official criterion for the parade contest, as a way for the school to show to the public the story concept for the year's event. The flag today is in green and pink stripes radiating from the center and the coat of arms - until the 1980s the school sported a pink flag with the emblem in the center.

One of the most figures of the Mangueira samba was Jamelão, who was the official school singer from 1949 until 2006 (57 years) and become a true "carnival and samba institution" in Rio, with his mannerisms and his voice. In 2006, Jamelão suffered a cerebrovascular accident (CVA) stroke and did not record the Mangueira theme song for the official 2007 Carnival CD, nor could he march with the school. (From 1950 up to that year his voice was featured in every Carnival LP and CD produced by the carnival organizers, together with those of other schools.)

=== 1980s and beyond ===
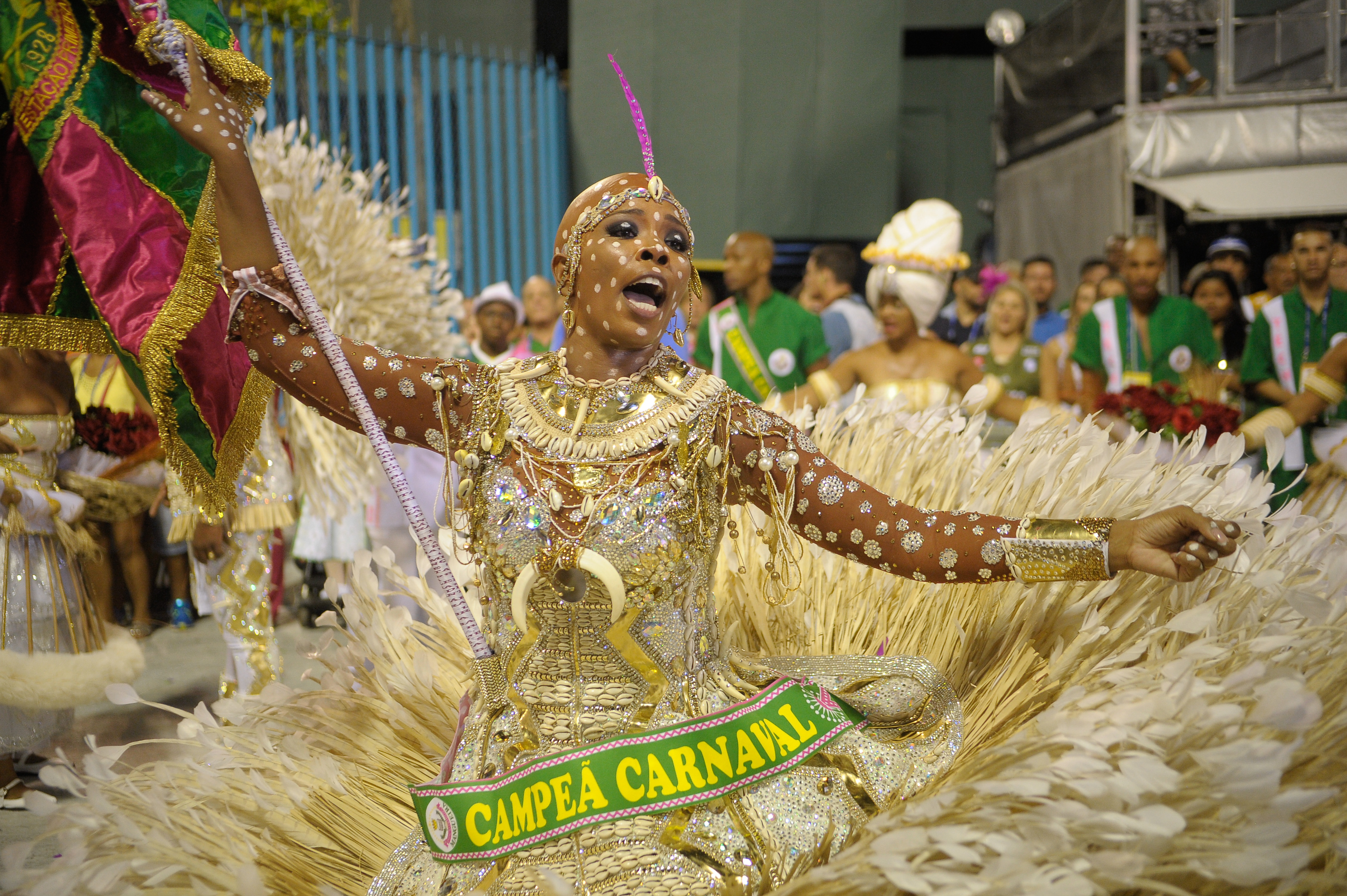
A Porta-bandeira in the 2016 champions parade 2016

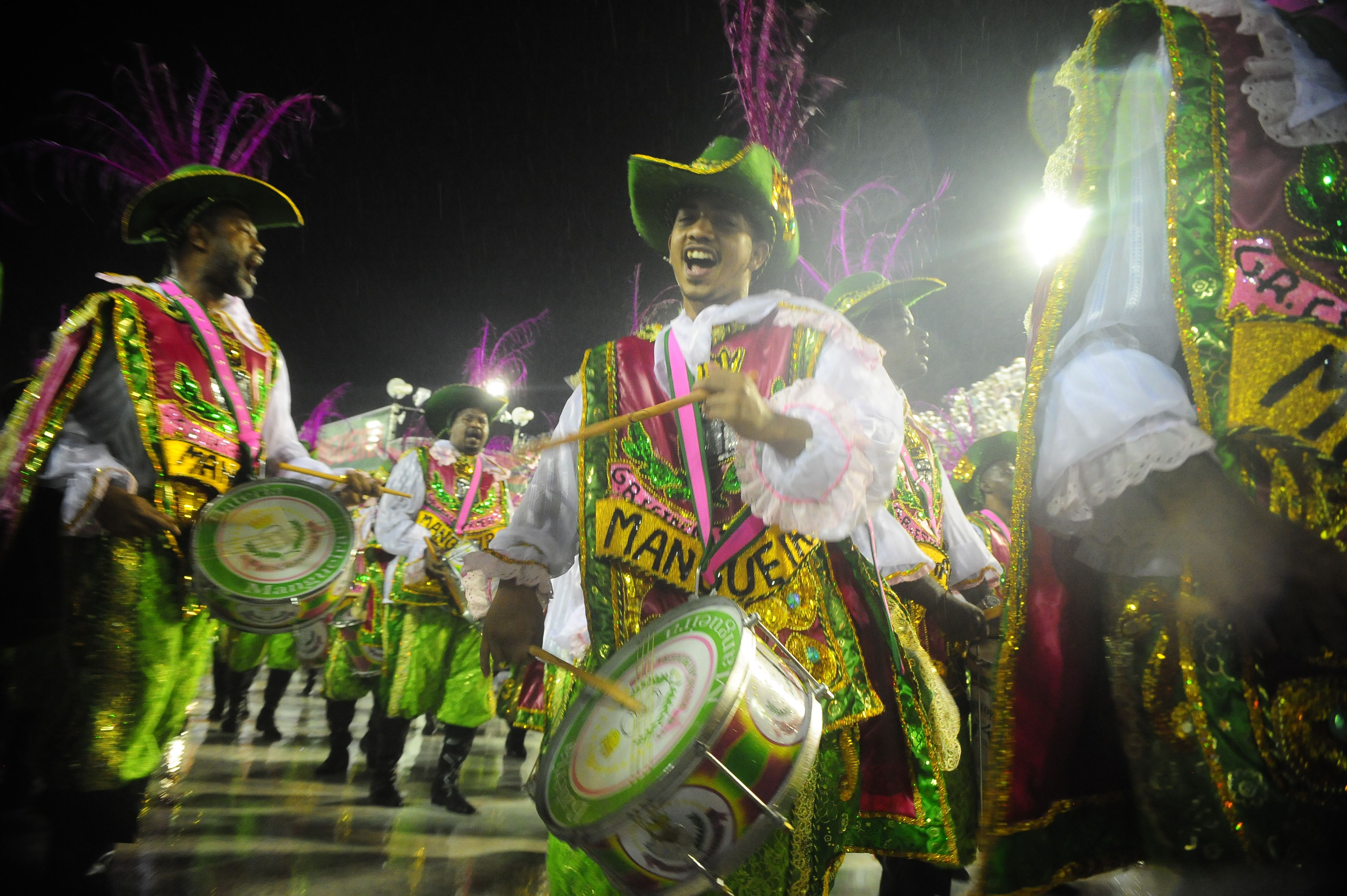
Mangueira's bateria in the Carnival parade of 2015.

Mangueira holds 20 general championship titles, and 1 Super Cup, exclusively won only in 1984, the inauguration of the Sambódromo. In 1984, Mangueira was the champion of the Carnival on Monday, Portela on Sunday. Three schools went on for the Championship Saturday where they competed in the Super Championship, and in the end the school won the general super championship of the year.

In 2007, Mangueira confronted various taboos. After 79 years, Mangueira celebrated the 80th anniversary opening the doors of its percussion drums section to women. The idea of the president of the Mangueira drums, Ivo Meirelles, to accept women in the battery of Green and Pink was controversial. Moreover, Preta Gil became queen of the Drums Section (or Queen of Drums) of the school, breaking a tradition of having only queens originating from the community, elected through a contest. Luizito replaced Jamelão as school singer. On the show, the school board prevented the big star Beth Carvalho from parading, and the legendary Nelson Sargento preferred not to parade either, possibly because his wife's costume had not been delivered. Such developments led to a certain unease in samba circles and a lot of criticism for the directors of contemporary samba schools.

In 2008, Mangueira underwent what many consider their worst crisis. First, their theme was not about the 100th Anniversary of Cartola, but on the centenary of the frevo, which is music not from Rio but from the state of Pernambuco - the first time that form of music had been featured as the school theme. Second, the choice of the Queen of Drums Section (in Portuguese Rainha de Bateria), and finally the involvement with the hill drug traffic, which resulted in a disappointing 10th place.

On June 14, 2008, the school lost one of its greatest icons: Jamelão, the victim of multiple organ failure. The loss of Jamelão left a huge void not only in the school but also in the whole of Brazil's samba community.

In 2009, after eight years as the head of the school, Max Lopes left and was replaced by the carnivalist Roberto Szaniecki. The theme was a tribute to the Brazilian people, based on the book O Povo Brasileiro, Formação e Sentido do Brasil, by professor, anthropologist and politician Darcy Ribeiro.

After the Carnival of 2009, there was an election, won by Ivo Meirelles, who decided to shake up the structure of the school. Since then, new names have been hired and the first changes were the carnivalist Márcia Lage, the new MC and Flag Bearer, Raphael and Marcella Alves, and the creation of a trio called "The Three Tenors", comprising Luizito, Zé Paulo Sierra and Rixxah.

For 2010, the school chose the theme Mangueira is the Music of Brazil by Marcia Lage, who was removed and replaced by Jaime Cezário and Jorge Caribé.

The 2015 edition saw the school place 10th at the final standings - one of its worst finishes ever. The following year, its tribute to the beloved singer Maria Bethânia saw it win its 19th Carnival as the general champion for the Special Group. It also won its Gold Standard award (for best school and revelation of the Carnival respectively).

For 2019, the school paraded in a theme of remembrance of Brazil's Native American populations who were the first inhabitants of the country before Portuguese colonization, and finished its campaign with its 20th general championship, plus two Gold Standards (for best school and best flag bearer).

== Notable Mangueirenses ==
- Alcione
- Alexandre Borges
- Alexandre Pires
- Angélica
- Beth Carvalho
- Bezerra da Silva
- Caetano Veloso
- Cartola
- Camila Pitanga
- Chico Buarque
- Chico Pinheiro
- Emílio Santiago
- Flávia Alessandra
- Gal Costa
- Isabel Fillardis
- Ivo Meirelles
- Júnior
- Leandra Leal
- Leci Brandão
- Lobão
- Maria Bethânia
- Maria Rita
- Milton Gonçalves
- Milton Nascimento
- Moreira da Silva
- Mussum
- Nelson Cavaquinho
- Nelson Sargento
- Preta Gil
- Raí
- Roberta Sá
- Rosemary
- Sérgio Cabral Filho
- Tiago Leifert
- Tom Jobim
- Vincent Cassel

== Classifications ==
Year	Place	Division	Plot	Carnivals Producers	Ref			
Year	Place	Division	Plot	Singers	Ref			
1929	Sambista Contest		Chega de demanda e Beijos	Sr. Armando				
1930	Did not compete							
1931	Did not compete							
1932	Champion	Grupo Único	Sorrindo e Na floresta	Sr. Armando				
1932	Champion	Grupo Único	Sorrindo e Na floresta	Cartola; Carlos Cachaça				
1933	Champion	Grupo Único	Uma segunda-feira do Bonfim na Ribeira	Sr. Armando				
1933	Champion	Grupo Único	Uma segunda-feira do Bonfim na Ribeira	Cartola; Carlos Cachaça				
1934	Champion	Grupo Único	República da Orgia	Sr. Armando				
1934	Champion	Grupo Único	República da Orgia	Cartola; Carlos Cachaça				
1935	Vice Champion	UGESB	O regresso de uma colheita na primavera	Sr. Armando				
1935	Vice Champion	UGESB	O regresso de uma colheita na primavera	Cartola; Carlos Cachaça				
1936	Vice Champion	UGESB	Não quero mais amar a ninguém	Sr. Armando				
1936	Vice Champion	UGESB	Não quero mais amar a ninguém	Cartola; Carlos Cachaça				
1937	Did not compete							
1938	Did not compete							
1939	Champion	UGESB	O Jardim	Sr. Armando				
1939	Champion	UGESB	O Jardim	Cartola; Carlos Cachaça				
1940	Champion	UGESB	Prantos, pretos e poetas	Sr. Armando				
1940	Champion	UGESB	Prantos, pretos e poetas	Cartola; Carlos Cachaça				
1941	Vice Champion	UGESB	Pedro Ernesto	Sr. Armando				
1941	Vice Champion	UGESB	Pedro Ernesto	Cartola; Carlos Cachaça				
1942	3rd place	UGESB	A vitória do Samba nas Américas	Sr. Armando				
1942	3rd place	UGESB	A vitória do Samba nas Américas	Cartola; Carlos Cachaça				
1943	Vice Champion	UGESB	Samba no Palácio do Itamarati	Sr. Armando				
1943	Vice Champion	UGESB	Samba no Palácio do Itamarati	Cartola; Carlos Cachaça				
1944	Vice Champion	UGESB	Glória ao Samba	Sr. Armando				
1944	Vice Champion	UGESB	Glória ao Samba	Cartola; Carlos Cachaça				
1945	Vice Champion	UGESB	Nossa História	Sr. Armando				
1945	Vice Champion	UGESB	Nossa História	Cartola; Carlos Cachaça				
1946	Vice Champion	UGESB	Carnaval da Vitória	Sr. Armando				
1946	Vice Champion	UGESB	Carnaval da Vitória	Cartola; Carlos Cachaça				
1947	Vice Champion	UGESB	Brasil, Ciências e Artes	Sr. Armando				
1947	Vice Champion	UGESB	Brasil, Ciências e Artes	Cartola; Carlos Cachaça				
1948	4th place	FBES	Brasil, Tesouro Invejado	Sr. Armando				
1948	4th place	FBES	Brasil, Tesouro Invejado	Xangô da Mangueira				
1949	Champion	UGESB	Apoteose aos Mestres	Funcionários da Casa da Moeda				
1949	Champion	UGESB	Apoteose aos Mestres	Jamelão				
1950	Champion	UGESB	Plano SALTE - Saúde, alimentação, transporte e energia	Funcionários da Casa da Moeda				
1950	Champion	UGESB	Plano SALTE - Saúde, alimentação, transporte e energia	Jamelão				
1951	3rd place	UGESB	Unidade Nacional	Funcionários da Casa da Moeda				
1951	3rd place	UGESB	Unidade Nacional	Jamelão				
1952	Did not compete		Gonçalves Dias	Funcionários da Casa da Moeda				
1952	Did not compete		Gonçalves Dias	Jamelão				
1953	3rd place	Grupo 1	Unidade Nacional	Funcionários da Casa da Moeda				
1953	3rd place	Grupo 1	Unidade Nacional	Jamelão				
1954	Champion	Grupo 1	Rio de Janeiro, de ontem e de hoje	Funcionários da Casa da Moeda				
1954	Champion	Grupo 1	Rio de Janeiro, de ontem e de hoje	Jamelão				
1955	Vice Champion	Grupo 1	Cântico à Natureza	Funcionários da Casa da Moeda				
1955	Vice Champion	Grupo 1	Cântico à Natureza	Jamelão				
1956	3rd place	Grupo 1	O Grande Presidente	Funcionários da Casa da Moeda				
1956	3rd place	Grupo 1	O Grande Presidente	Jamelão				
1957	3rd place	Grupo 1	Emancipação Nacional - Rumo ao progresso	Funcionários da Casa da Moeda				
1957	3rd place	Grupo 1	Emancipação Nacional - Rumo ao progresso	Jamelão				
1958	3rd place	Grupo 1	Canção do exílio	Funcionários da Casa da Moeda				
1958	3rd place	Grupo 1	Canção do exílio	Jamelão				
1959	3rd place	Grupo 1	Brasil através dos tempos	Funcionários da Casa da Moeda				
1959	3rd place	Grupo 1	Brasil através dos tempos	Jamelão				
1960	Champion	Grupo 1	Carnaval de todos os tempos	Roberto Paulino; Darque Dias Moreira				
1960	Champion	Grupo 1	Carnaval de todos os tempos	Jamelão				
1961	Champion	Grupo 1	Reminiscências do Rio Antigo	Roberto Paulino; Darque Dias Moreira				
1961	Champion	Grupo 1	Reminiscências do Rio Antigo	Jamelão				
1962	4th place	Grupo 1	Casa-grande e senzala	Roberto Paulino; Darque Dias Moreira				
1962	4th place	Grupo 1	Casa-grande e senzala	Jamelão				
1963	Vice Champion	Grupo 1	Exaltação à Bahia	Júlio Mattos				
1963	Vice Champion	Grupo 1	Exaltação à Bahia	Jamelão				
1964	3rd place	Grupo 1	História de um preto velho	Júlio Mattos				
1964	3rd place	Grupo 1	História de um preto velho	Jamelão				
1965	4th place	Grupo 1	Rio através dos séculos	Júlio Mattos				
1965	4th place	Grupo 1	Rio através dos séculos	Jamelão				
1966	Vice Champion	Grupo 1	Exaltação à Villa-Lobos	Júlio Mattos				
1966	Vice Champion	Grupo 1	Exaltação à Villa-Lobos	Jamelão				
1967	Champion	Grupo 1	O mundo encantado de Monteiro Lobato	Júlio Mattos				
1967	Champion	Grupo 1	O mundo encantado de Monteiro Lobato	Jamelão				
1968	Champion	Grupo 1	Samba, festa de um povo	Júlio Mattos				
1968	Champion	Grupo 1	Samba, festa de um povo	Jamelão				
1969	Vice Champion	Grupo 1	Os Mercadores e suas tradições	Júlio Mattos				
1969	Vice Champion	Grupo 1	Os Mercadores e suas tradições	Jamelão				
1970	3rd place	Grupo 1	Um Cântico à natureza	Júlio Mattos				
1970	3rd place	Grupo 1	Um Cântico à natureza	Jamelão				
1971	4th place	Grupo 1	Os Modernos bandeirantes	Júlio Mattos				
1971	4th place	Grupo 1	Os Modernos bandeirantes	Jamelão				
1972	Vice Champion	Grupo 1	Rio, Carnaval dos Carnavais	Carlos Alberto				
1972	Vice Champion	Grupo 1	Rio, Carnaval dos Carnavais	Jamelão				
1973	Champion	Grupo 1	Lendas do Abaeté	Júlio Mattos				
1973	Champion	Grupo 1	Lendas do Abaeté	Jamelão				
1974	4th place	Grupo 1	Mangueira em tempo de folclore	Júlio Mattos				
1974	4th place	Grupo 1	Mangueira em tempo de folclore	Jamelão				
1975	Vice Champion	Grupo 1	Imagens poéticas de Jorge Lima	Elói Machado				
1975	Vice Champion	Grupo 1	Imagens poéticas de Jorge Lima	Jamelão				
1976	Vice Champion	Grupo 1	No reino da Mãe do Ouro	Elói Machado				
1976	Vice Champion	Grupo 1	No reino da Mãe do Ouro	Jamelão				
1977	7th place	Grupo 1	Panapanã, o segredo do amor	Júlio Mattos				
1977	7th place	Grupo 1	Panapanã, o segredo do amor	Jamelão				
1978	Vice Champion	Grupo 1	Dos carroceiros do imperador ao Palácio do Samba	Júlio Mattos				
1978	Vice Champion	Grupo 1	Dos carroceiros do imperador ao Palácio do Samba	Jamelão				
1979	4th place	Grupo 1A	Avatar... e a selva transformou-se em ouro	Júlio Mattos				
1979	4th place	Grupo 1A	Avatar... e a selva transformou-se em ouro	Jamelão				
1980	8th place	Grupo 1A	Coisas nossas	Liana Silveira; Ecila Cirne				
1980	8th place	Grupo 1A	Coisas nossas	Jamelão				
1981	4th place	Grupo 1A	De Nonô a JK	Alcione Barreto; Elói Machado				
1981	4th place	Grupo 1A	De Nonô a JK	Jamelão				
1982	4th place	Grupo 1A	As mil e uma noites cariocas	Fernando Pinto				
1982	4th place	Grupo 1A	As mil e uma noites cariocas	Jamelão				
1983	5th place	Grupo 1A	Verde que te quero rosa... semente viva do samba	Max Lopes				
1983	5th place	Grupo 1A	Verde que te quero rosa... semente viva do samba	Jamelão				
1984	Champion	Grupo 1A	Yes, Nós Temos Braguinha	Max Lopes				
1984	Champion	Grupo 1A	Yes, Nós Temos Braguinha	Jamelão				
1985	9th place	Grupo 1A	Abram Alas que eu quero passar	Eloy Machado; Bia Dumont				
1985	9th place	Grupo 1A	Abram Alas que eu quero passar	Jamelão				
1986	Champion	Grupo 1A	Caymmi Mostra ao Mundo o que a Bahia e a Mangueira Têm	Júlio Mattos				
1986	Champion	Grupo 1A	Caymmi Mostra ao Mundo o que a Bahia e a Mangueira Têm	Jamelão				
1987	Champion	Grupo 1	O Reino dos Palavras, Carlos Drummond de Andrade	Júlio Mattos				
1987	Champion	Grupo 1	O Reino dos Palavras, Carlos Drummond de Andrade	Jamelão				
1988	Vice Champion	Grupo 1	Cem Anos de Liberdade, Realidade ou Ilusão?	Júlio Mattos				
1988	Vice Champion	Grupo 1	Cem Anos de Liberdade, Realidade ou Ilusão?	Jamelão				
1989	11th place	Grupo 1	Trinca de Reis	Júlio Mattos				
1989	11th place	Grupo 1	Trinca de Reis	Jamelão				
1990	8th place	Grupo Especial	Deu a Louca no Barroco	Ernesto Nascimento; Cláudio Rodrigues				
1990	8th place	Grupo Especial	Deu a Louca no Barroco	Jamelão				
1991	12th place	Grupo Especial	As Três Rendeiras do Universo	Ernesto Nascimento; Cláudio Rodrigues				
1991	12th place	Grupo Especial	As Três Rendeiras do Universo	Jamelão				
1992	6th place	Grupo Especial	Se Todos Fossem Iguais a Você	Ilvamar Magalhães				
1992	6th place	Grupo Especial	Se Todos Fossem Iguais a Você	Jamelão				
1993	5th place	Grupo Especial	Dessa Fruta Eu Como até o Caroço	Ilvamar Magalhães				
1993	5th place	Grupo Especial	Dessa Fruta Eu Como até o Caroço	Jamelão				
1994	11th place	Grupo Especial	Atrás da Verde-e-Rosa Só Não Vai Quem Já Morreu	Ilvamar Magalhães				
1994	11th place	Grupo Especial	Atrás da Verde-e-Rosa Só Não Vai Quem Já Morreu	Jamelão				
1995	6th place	Grupo Especial	A Esmeralda do Atlântico	Ilvamar Magalhães				
1995	6th place	Grupo Especial	A Esmeralda do Atlântico	Jamelão				
1996	4th place	Grupo Especial	Os Tambores da Mangueria na Terra da Encantaria	Oswaldo Jardim				
1996	4th place	Grupo Especial	Os Tambores da Mangueria na Terra da Encantaria	Jamelão				
1997	3rd place	Grupo Especial	O Olimpo é Verde e Rosa	Oswaldo Jardim				
1997	3rd place	Grupo Especial	O Olimpo é Verde e Rosa	Jamelão				
1998	Champion	Grupo Especial	Chico Buarque da Mangueira	Alexandre Louzada				
1998	Champion	Grupo Especial	Chico Buarque da Mangueira	Jamelão				
1999	7th place	Grupo Especial	O Século do Samba	Alexandre Louzada				
1999	7th place	Grupo Especial	O Século do Samba	Jamelão				
2000	7th place	Grupo Especial	Dom Obá II, Rei dos Esfarrapados, Príncipe do Povo	Alexandre Louzada				
2000	7th place	Grupo Especial	Dom Obá II, Rei dos Esfarrapados, Príncipe do Povo	Jamelão				
2001	3rd place	Grupo Especial	A Seiva da Vida	Max Lopes				
2001	3rd place	Grupo Especial	A Seiva da Vida	Jamelão				
2002	Champion	Grupo Especial	Brazil com 'Z' é para Cabra da Peste, Brasil com 'S' é a Nação do Nordeste	Max Lopes				
2002	Champion	Grupo Especial	Brazil com 'Z' é para Cabra da Peste, Brasil com 'S' é a Nação do Nordeste	Jamelão				
2003	Vice Champion	Grupo Especial	Os Dez Mandamentos: O Samba da Paz Canta a Saga da Liberdade	Max Lopes				
2003	Vice Champion	Grupo Especial	Os Dez Mandamentos: O Samba da Paz Canta a Saga da Liberdade	Jamelão				
2004	3rd place	Grupo Especial	Mangueira Redescobre a Estrada Real...E Desse Eldorado Faz seu Carnaval	Max Lopes				
2004	3rd place	Grupo Especial	Mangueira Redescobre a Estrada Real...E Desse Eldorado Faz seu Carnaval	Jamelão				
2005	6th place	Grupo Especial	Mangueira Energiza a Avenida. O Carnaval é Pura Energia e a Energia é o Nosso Desafio	Max Lopes				
2005	6th place	Grupo Especial	Mangueira Energiza a Avenida. O Carnaval é Pura Energia e a Energia é o Nosso Desafio	Jamelão				
2006	4th place	Grupo Especial	Das Águas do Velho Chico, Nasce um Rio de Esperança	Max Lopes				
2006	4th place	Grupo Especial	Das Águas do Velho Chico, Nasce um Rio de Esperança	Jamelão				
2007	3rd place	Grupo Especial	Minha Pátria é Minha Língua, Mangueira Meu Grande Amor. Meu Samba Vai ao Lácio e Colhe a Última Flor	Max Lopes				
2007	3rd place	Grupo Especial	Minha Pátria é Minha Língua, Mangueira Meu Grande Amor. Meu Samba Vai ao Lácio e Colhe a Última Flor	Luizito				
2008	10th place	Grupo Especial	100 Anos do Frevo, é de Perder o Sapato. Recife Mandou me Chamar...	Max Lopes				
2008	10th place	Grupo Especial	100 Anos do Frevo, é de Perder o Sapato. Recife Mandou me Chamar...	Luizito				
2009	6th place	Grupo Especial	A Mangueira Traz Os Brasis do Brasil Mostrando a Formação do Povo Brasileiro	Roberto Szaniecki				
2009	6th place	Grupo Especial	A Mangueira Traz Os Brasis do Brasil Mostrando a Formação do Povo Brasileiro	Luizito				
2010	6th place	Grupo Especial	Mangueira é Música do Brasil	Jaime Cezário; Jorge Caribé				
2010	6th place	Grupo Especial	Mangueira é Música do Brasil	Luizito; Zé Paulo Sierra; Rixxah				
2011	3rd place	Grupo Especial	O Filho Fiel, Sempre Mangueira	Mauro Quintaes; Wagner Gonçalves				
2011	3rd place	Grupo Especial	O Filho Fiel, Sempre Mangueira	Luizito; Zé Paulo Sierra; Ciganerey				
2012	7th place	Grupo Especial	Vou festejar! Sou Cacique, sou Mangueira	Cid Carvalho				
2012	7th place	Grupo Especial	Vou festejar! Sou Cacique, sou Mangueira	Luizito; Zé Paulo Sierra; Ciganerey				
2013	8th place	Grupo Especial	Cuiabá: Um paraíso no Centro da América	Cid Carvalho				
2013	8th place	Grupo Especial	Cuiabá: Um paraíso no Centro da América	Luizito; Zé Paulo Sierra; Ciganerey; Agnaldo Amaral				
2014	8th place	Grupo Especial	A festança brasileira cai no samba da Mangueira	Rosa Magalhães				
2014	8th place	Grupo Especial	A festança brasileira cai no samba da Mangueira	Luizito				
2015	10th place	Grupo Especial	Agora chegou a vez vou cantar: Mulher de Mangueira, Mulher brasileira em primeiro Lugar	Cid Carvalho				
2015	10th place	Grupo Especial	Agora chegou a vez vou cantar: Mulher de Mangueira, Mulher brasileira em primeiro Lugar	Luizito				
2016	Champion	Grupo Especial	Maria Bethânia: A Menina dos Olhos de Oyá	Leandro Vieira				
2016	Champion	Grupo Especial	Maria Bethânia: A Menina dos Olhos de Oyá	Ciganerey				
2017	4th place	Grupo Especial	Só com a ajuda do santo	Leandro Vieira				
2017	4th place	Grupo Especial	Só com a ajuda do santo	Ciganerey				
2018	5th place	Grupo Especial	Com dinheiro ou sem dinheiro, eu brinco!	Leandro Vieira				
2018	5th place	Grupo Especial	Com dinheiro ou sem dinheiro, eu brinco!	Ciganerey				
2019	Champion	Grupo Especial	História pra ninar gente grande	Leandro Vieira				
2019	Champion	Grupo Especial	História pra ninar gente grande	Marquinho Art'Samba				
2020	6th place	Grupo Especial	A verdade vos fará livre	Leandro Vieira				
2020	6th place	Grupo Especial	A verdade vos fará livre	Marquinho Art'Samba				
2022	7th place	Grupo Especial	Agenor, José e Laurindo	Leandro Vieira				
2022	7th place	Grupo Especial	Agenor, José e Laurindo	Marquinho Art'Samba				
2023	5th place	Grupo Especial	As Áfricas que a Bahia canta	Annik Salmon; Guilherme Estevão				
2023	5th place	Grupo Especial	As Áfricas que a Bahia canta	Marquinho Art'Samba; Dowglas Diniz				
2024	7th place	Grupo Especial	A Negra Voz do Amanhã	Annik Salmon; Guilherme Estevão				
2024	7th place	Grupo Especial	A Negra Voz do Amanhã	Marquinho Art'Samba; Dowglas Diniz				
2025	6th place	Grupo Especial	À Flor da Terra - No Rio da Negritude Entre Dores e Paixões	Sidnei França				
2025	6th place	Grupo Especial	À Flor da Terra - No Rio da Negritude Entre Dores e Paixões	Marquinho Art'Samba; Dowglas Diniz	2026	6th place	Grupo Especial	“Mestre Sacaca do Encanto Tucuju – O Guardião da Amazônia Negra”
Dowglas Diniz					2026	6th place	Grupo Especial	“Mestre Sacaca do Encanto Tucuju – O Guardião da Amazônia Negra”
