= Carlos Cachaça =

Brazilian composer of samba

- Born: Carlos Moreira de Castro; 3 August 1902; Rio de Janeiro, Brazil
- Died: 16 August 1999 (aged 97) Rio de Janeiro, Brazil
- Genre: Samba
- Occupations: Songwriter, composer
- Years active: 1920s–1980s

Carlos Cachaça (born Carlos Moreira de Castro; 3 August 1902 – 16 August 1999) was a Brazilian samba composer and performer. He was one of the founders of the Mangueira Samba School.

== Early life ==
Cachaça was born and raised in Mangueira in Rio de Janeiro’s North Zone. His nickname derived from the sugarcane liquor cachaça, a drink he enjoyed as a young man. As a teenager, he played the tambourine with local street musicians performing early samba, an Afro-Brazilian style blending percussion and urban themes.

== Career ==
In 1922, Cachaça met fellow composer Cartola. Together they later co-founded the street troupe Arengueiros, which evolved into the Mangueira Samba School in 1928. With Cartola, he composed more than 400 songs, including themes for Mangueira’s carnival parades such as "Pudesse Meu Ideal" and "Alvorada". Although he received little financial reward and worked as a railway employee, his music helped establish the samba-enredo style, which remains central to Rio’s carnival.

== Later life and death ==
Cachaça continued to be celebrated as one of Mangueira’s founding figures. Two years before his death, he appeared in a carnival parade seated on a float, honored for his contribution to samba. Cachaça died of pneumonia in Rio de Janeiro on 16 August 1999, aged 97. He is survived by three daughters.

== Legacy ==
Cachaça’s compositions, including "Clotilde" and "Não Quero Amar Ninguém" ("I Don’t Want to Love Anyone"), remain part of Brazil’s popular music heritage. He is remembered as a foundational figure in transforming samba from local street music into a symbol of national identity.
