= Mangueira =

- Neighborhood
- Location in Rio de Janeiro Mangueira (Brazil)
- Coordinates: 22°54′14″S 43°14′13″W
- Country: Brazil
- State: Rio de Janeiro (RJ)
- Municipality/City: Rio de Janeiro
- Zone: Centro

Mangueira (Mango Tree) is a shantytown neighborhood (favela) in the city of Rio de Janeiro, Brazil, centered on the Mangueira hill or morro. It is most famous for its samba school, the Estação Primeira de Mangueira (First Mangueira [train] Station) or simply Mangueira, which is one of strongest competitors in the annual Rio Carnival samba competition.
