= List of Brazilian films of 2023 =

This is a list of films produced in Brazil in 2023:

Title	Director	Cast (Subject of documentary)	Genre	Release date	Notes
Angela	Hugo Prata	Ísis Valverde, Gabriel Braga Nunes, Bianca Bin, Emílio Orciollo Netto, Chris Couto, Gustavo Machado, Carolina Manica, Alice Carvalh	Drama	August 12, 2023	
Aunt Virginia (Tia Virgínia)	Fabio Meira	Vera Holtz, Arlete Salles, Louise Cardoso, Vera Valdez, Daniela Fontan, Iuri Saraiva, Antônio Pitanga, Amanda Lyra	Comedy-drama	August 13, 2023	Nominated - Golden Kikito at the 51st Gramado Film Festival Winner - Kikito Critics Prize for Best Film, Best Actress for Vera Holtz, Best Screenplay, Best Art Direction, Best Sound Design & Honorable Mention for Vera Valdez
Chef Jack: The Adventurous Cook (Chef Jack: O Cozinheiro Aventureiro)	Guilherme Fiúza Zenha	Danton Mello, Rodrigo Waschburger, Cintia Ferrer, Cecilia Fernandes, Renan Rammé, Álvaro Rosacosta, Tássia D'Paula, Guilherme Briggs, Rejane Faria, Marisa Rotenberg, Ana Laura Salles, Renata Corrêa, Carlos Magno Ribeiro, Giordano Becheleni	Adventure, Comedy	January 19, 2023	
Heavier Is the Sky (Mais Pesado é o Céu)	Petrus Cariry	Matheus Nachtergaele, Ana Luiza Rios, Danny Barbosa as Letícia, Sílvia Buarque, Pedro Domingues, Galba Nogueira, Buda Lira, Magno Carvalho, Marcos Duarte	Drama	August 14, 2023	Nominated - Golden Kikito at the 51st Gramado Film Festival Winner - Best Director, Best Cinematography, Best Editing & Special Jury Prize for Ana Luiza Rios
Neon Heart	Lucas Estevan Soares	Lucas Estevan Soares, Ana de Ferro, Wawa Black	Drama	March 9, 2023	Remi Trophy - Special Jury Award (WorldFest Houston); Best Foreign Language Feature (MIFF)
Prison in the Andes	Felipe Carmona	Bastián Bodenhöfer, Hugo Medina, Andrew Bargsted, Mauricio Pesutic, Alejandro Trejo, Óscar Hernández, Daniel Alcaíno, Juan Carlos Maldonado	Drama	October 6, 2023	Nominated - Sutherland Trophy at the 67th BFI London Film Festival Nominated - Golden Colon at the 49th Huelva Ibero-American Film Festival Winner - Best Performance at the 49th Huelva Ibero-American Film Festival Nominated - Ibero-American Fiction Feature Film - Best Picture at the 39th Guadalajara International Film Festival
Mussum, o Filmis	Silvio Guindane	Ailton Graça, Cacau Protásio, Neusa Borges, Gero Camilo, Stepan Nercessian, Augusto Madeira, Larissa Luz, Wilson Simoninha, Ícaro Silva	Biopic	November 2, 2023	
Toll (Pedágio)	Carolina Markowicz	Maeve Jinkings, Thomás Aquino, Isac Graça, Caio Macedo, Kauan Alvarenga, Aline Marta Maia	Drama		
