= Lucas Estevan Soares =

Brazilian film director, screenwriter, producer, actor and musician

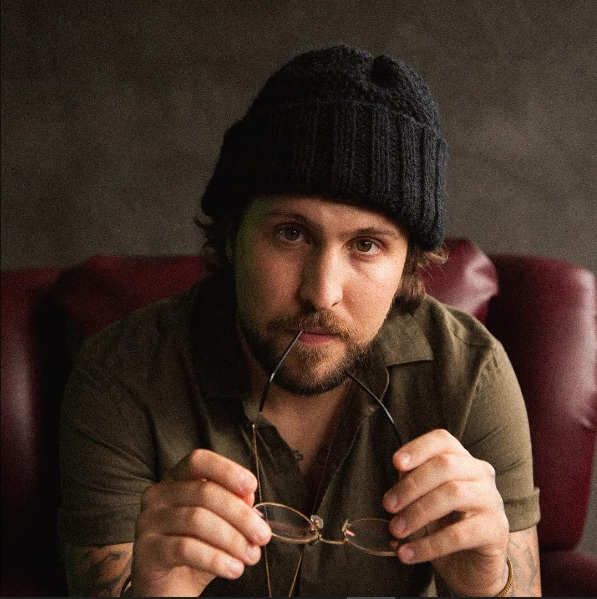
- Lucas Estevan Soares in 2022.
- Born: 24 July 1990 (age 36); Curitiba, Paraná, Brazil
- Occupations: Film director, screenwriter, producer, actor, musician
- Years active: 2007–present
- Known for: Neon Heart (2023); Independent Roads (2012)
- Spouse: Rhaissa Gonçalves
- Awards: WorldFest (2022); MIFF (2022); FestCine Pedra Azul (2022) (Note: FestCine Pedra Azul International Film Festival is a film festival that hosts national and international productions. It is held in Espírito Santo state, and its 1st edition took place in 2018. The name of event refers to Pedra Azul, a granite rock formation located in the city of Domingos Martins.); Musa D'Argento (2016) (Note: The Premio Nazionale Musa D'Argento is a festival held in Italy since 2016 that awards the outstanding works organized in three predefined areas: Cinema, Talent and Art.)
- Website: Official website

Lucas Estevan Soares (born 24 July 1990) is a Brazilian film director, screenwriter, producer, actor and musician.

He is active in the area of independent cinema, both in Brazil and abroad, and is known for the films Independent Roads (2012) and Neon Heart (2023).

== Early life ==
Lucas Estevan Soares was born in Curitiba in 1990, and spent his childhood and adolescence in Boqueirão, (Note: Boqueirão is a neighborhood located in the southwest region of Curitiba, and one of the largest in the capital of Paraná. The name "Boqueirão" ("big mouth") identified a well-known deep grave existing in the old Farm Boqueirão, property that originated the locality.) one of the largest neighborhoods of the capital of Paraná. In 2007 he began his acting career, joined the theater company Teatratividade (Note: The theatrical company Teatratividade Produções was founded in 2007 in Curitiba by Reikrauss Benemond (1971). The shows were held in the building of the former Cine Glória until closing its activities in this place in 2014.) and acted in several theater shows in Brazil.

== Career ==
Soares moved to Rio de Janeiro in 2009 and entered the Filmmaking Program at Estácio de Sá University. The following year he directed and scripted his first films: Kabbalah, an experimental mid-length, and the short films Absence of Us and Terminal 2 (subsequently renamed to The Airport Date). With them he participated in local festivals and international festivals such as the Arouca Film Festival 2012 in Portugal and Très Court International Film Festival 2013 in Panama and Romania.

=== Independent Roads ===
In 2011, Soares immigrated to the United States. In Los Angeles he filmed Passports and Dreams, with actors of 10 nationalities and spoken in 5 languages, in which the director and screenwriter also participated as an actor. He received a job offer to work in the Philippines, he accepted and moved to Asia.

In Southeast Asia he directed Ends Meat (in Manila), Bojou (Nagoya, Japan) and the documentary From a New Fernando to Brazil (Phi Phi Islands, Thailand). In Oceania (Melbourne), he filmed Allegories of Us, in which he is the main lead actor.

In Europe, Soares was cast in the film Special Delivery, shot in Rome, Italy, by the director Andrea Traina. For his performance he won the award for "Best Short Film Actor" at the Premio Nazionale Musa D'Argento, held in Sicily in 2016.

Lucas Estevan Soares gathered the works Absence of Us, The Airport Date, Passports and Dreams, Ends Meat, Bojou, From a New Fernando to Brazil and Allegories of Us and released a new product, entitled Independent Roads. Between 2012 and 2013 he traveled to countries in Europe, Africa and Latin America showing his films and sharing his ideas and experiences regarding independent cinema in various exhibitions and festivals such as the 56th Café Com Filmes (CCFilmes 2012), in Portugal, the 10th Oberá en Cortos Film Festival, in Argentina, and the 12th Mostra do Filme Livre (MFL 2013), in Brazil.

=== International House of Cinema ===
In October 2012, Soares founded in Curitiba the film production company International House of Cinema (IHC). He began producing commercial videos and collaborating with local musicians.

He married Rhaissa Gonçalves in 2014, who became his partner in IHC and also shares with Soares the function of film producer.

Two years later IHC launched the short film Special Delivery, which earned Soares the award for "Best Short Film Actor" at the Premio Nazionale Musa D'Argento 2016, and the documentary Café em Leves Devaneios.

In 2017 they installed in Miami the second HQ of IHC and released two short films directed by Soares in 2011: Twisted Lines, filmed in New York City, and Portraits in the Water, shot in Singapore. In 2021 IHC created a film distribution company to mainly market its own productions.

=== Neon Heart ===
The repercussion of the music video "# Boquera", released in 2018, motivated the beginning of work on an idea that emerged in 2014, the production of a feature film with a singing telegram service car in the center of the plot and the Boqueirão neighborhood as a background.

The film, funded with resources from IHC (without support from public and tax incentive programs) in guerrilla filmmaking style, was recorded in late 2019, with post-production taking place the following year, already during the COVID-19 pandemic.

In 2022, Soares' first feature, who in addition to directing, scripting and acting also composed and participated in the production of the film and the soundtrack, toured the national and international circuit of film festivals, being well received by general critics (including being called in Cannes "great example of the new Brazilian popular cinema") and awarded in Houston, Moscow and Brazil. Neon Heart made its debut on the Brazilian commercial circuit on 9 March 2023.

== Filmography ==
Year	Title	Language	Role	Type
2010	Kabbalah	Portuguese	Film Director, screenwriter	Featurette
2012	Absence of Us	Portuguese	Film Director, screenwriter	Short film
2012	The Airport Date (original title: Terminal 2)	Portuguese	Film Director, screenwriter	Short film
2012	Passports and Dreams	English, German, Japanese, Portuguese, Spanish	Film Director, screenwriter, actor	Short film
2012	Ends Meat	Tagalog, English	Film Director, screenwriter	Short film
2012	Bojou	Japanese	Film Director, screenwriter	Short film
2012	From a New Fernando to Brazil	Portuguese	Film Director, screenwriter	Documentary
2012	Allegories of Us	English	Film Director, screenwriter, actor	Short film
2012	Independent Roads	Portuguese, English, German, Japanese, Spanish, Tagalog	Film Director, screenwriter, actor	Featurette
2016	Special Delivery	Italian	Actor	Short film
2016	Café em Leves Devaneios	Portuguese	Film Director	Documentary
2017	Twisted Lines	English	Film Director, screenwriter	Short film
2017	Portraits in the Water	Portuguese	Film Director, screenwriter, actor	Short film
2023	Neon Heart	Portuguese	Film Director, screenwriter, actor	Feature film

== Awards and nominations ==
Year	Award	Category	Nominated work	Result
2016	Premio Nazionale Musa D’Argento 2016	Best Short Film Actor	Special Delivery	Won
2022	55^{o} WorldFest-Houston International Film Festival	Remi Trophy (Special Jury Award)	Neon Heart	Won
2022	24^{o} RiverRun International Film Festival	RiverRun Audience Award	Neon Heart	Nominated
2022	19^{o} Big Apple Film Festival and Screenplay Competition (BAFF)	Best Feature Film	Neon Heart	Semi-finalist
2022	11^{o} Carmarthen Bay Film Festival (CBFF)	Feature Film	Neon Heart	Nominated
2022	Tokyo Lift-Off Film Festival		Neon Heart	Nominated
2022	44^{o} Moscow International Film Festival	Best Foreign Language Feature	Neon Heart	Won
2022	5^{o} FestCine Pedra Azul International Film Festival	Feature Film	Neon Heart	Won
2022	5^{o} FestCine Pedra Azul International Film Festival	Film Director	Lucas Estevan Soares	Won
2022	5^{o} FestCine Pedra Azul International Film Festival	Screenwriter	Lucas Estevan Soares	Won
2022	5^{o} FestCine Pedra Azul International Film Festival	Actor	Lucas Estevan Soares	Nominated
2022	31^{o} Cinequest Film & VR Festival	Drama	Neon Heart	Finalist
2022	5^{o} Nòt Film Fest	Shooting Star Features	Neon Heart	Nominated
2022	12^{o} Balneário Camboriú International Film Festival (BCIFF)	Features – Bilo Prize	Neon Heart	Nominated

== See also ==
- Cinema of Brazil
