= Pico Pedra Azul =

Mountain in Espírito Santo, Brazil

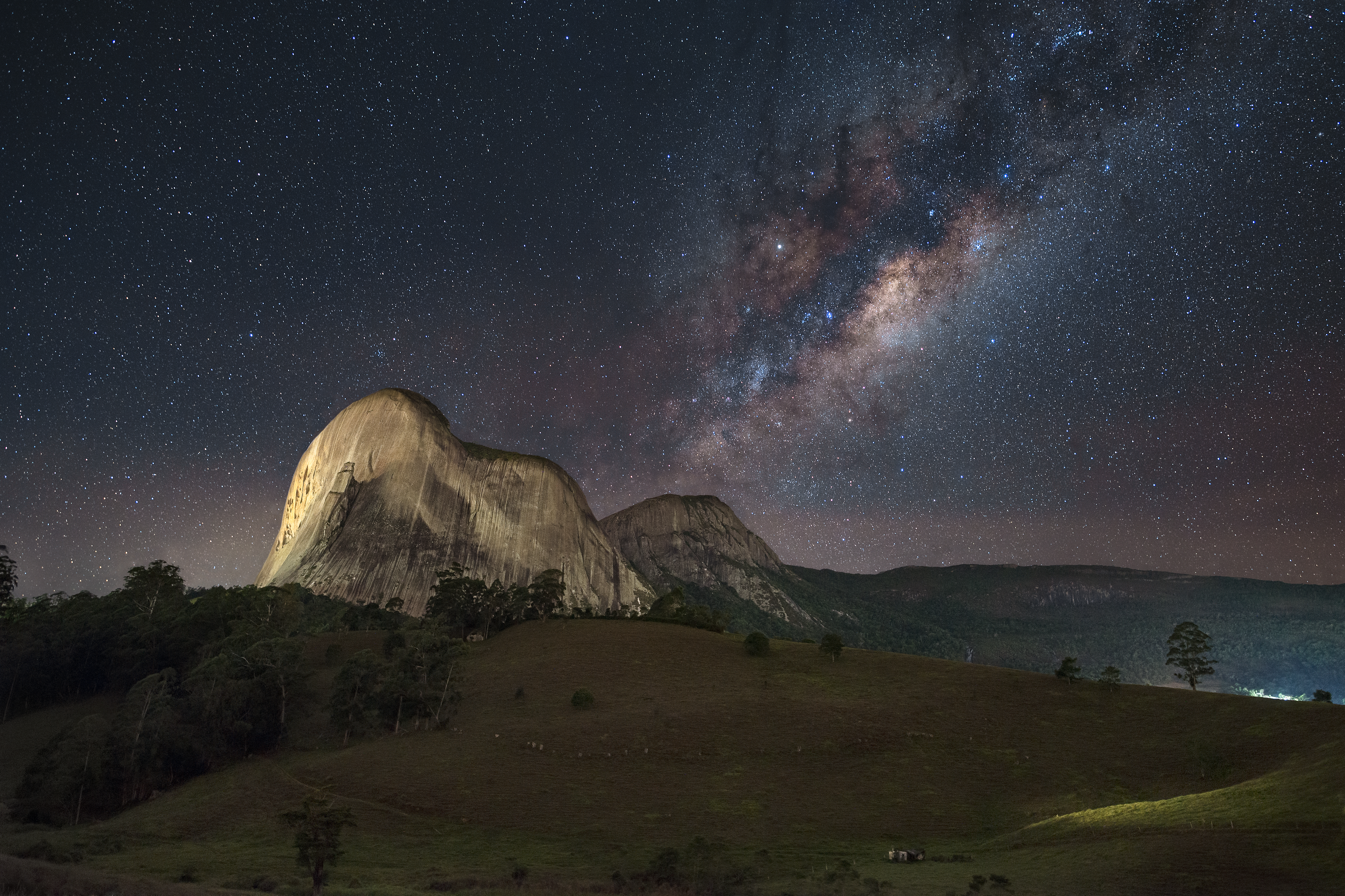
- Pico Pedra Azul at night

Highest point
- Elevation: 1,822 m (5,978 ft)
- Coordinates: 20°24′16″S 41°01′22″W

Geography
- Location within Brazil
- Location: Espírito Santo, Brazil

Pico Pedra Azul is a 1,822 m (5,978 ft) tall mountain of the Serra do Castelo in the state of Espírito Santo in Brazil. It lies in the municipality of Domingos Martins within the Pedra Azul State Park.

== Description ==
Pedra Azul is a gneiss inselberg rising approximately 500 m (1,600 ft) above the surrounding landscape. The mountain stands alongside the nearby Pedra das Flores, which reaches an elevation of 1,909 m (6,263 ft). It owes its name, meaning "blue stone" in Portuguese, to its distinctive grayish-blue coloration, which changes in intensity depending on the angle of the sunlight and which is due to the presence of lichens.
