= Neon Heart =

2022 film by Lucas Estevan Soares

- Portuguese: Coração de Neon
- Directed by: Lucas Estevan Soares
- Written by: Lucas Estevan Soares
- Produced by: Rhaissa Gonçalves
- Starring: Lucas Estevan Soares; Ana de Ferro; Paulo Matos; Wawa Black; Wagner Jovanaci
- Cinematography: Eduardo Ribeiro
- Edited by: Lucas Estevan Soares
- Music by: Lucas Estevan Soares; Gustavo Andriewiski; Jotta Valiente
- Production company: International House of Cinema (IHC)
- Distributed by: IHC Distribuição
- Release dates: 23 April 2022 (Houston); 21 May 2022 (Cannes); 9 March 2023 (Brazil)
- Running time: 100 minutes
- Country: Brazil
- Language: Portuguese
- Budget: R$1.5 million

Neon Heart (Portuguese: Coração de Neon, lit. '"Heart of Neon"') is a 2022 Brazilian drama film written and directed by Lucas Estevan Soares, and produced by Rhaissa Gonçalves. It stars Lucas Soares himself, Ana de Ferro and Wawa Black. In Neon Heart, Fernando (Soares) works with his father delivering romantic messages given as gifts to people all over town on board a telegram service car called Neon Heart.

Neon Heart is the first Brazilian film produced with Dolby Atmos 9.1 technology, which puts the viewer in a "bubble" in which the sound can be emitted from any position, depending on what occurs in the film, allowing the listener to perceive the difference between sounds received from different directions.

The film premiered at the 2022 WorldFest-Houston International Film Festival and was later released theatrically in Brazil on 9 March 2023. It received critical praise in and outside Brazil, and was awarded throughout 2022 at the Moscow, WorldFest Houston and FestCine Pedra Azul (Note: FestCine Pedra Azul International Film Festival is a film festival that hosts national and international productions. It is held in Espírito Santo state, and its 1st edition took place in 2018. The name of event refers to Pedra Azul, a granite rock formation located in the city of Domingos Martins.) international film festivals.

At the 75th Marché du Film, an event held annually in conjunction with the Cannes Film Festival, Neon Heart was cited as "great example of the new Brazilian popular cinema".

== Cast ==
- Lucas Estevan Soares as Fernando
- Ana de Ferro as Andressa
- Paulo Matos as Lau
- Wawa Black as Dinho
- Wagner Jovanaci as Gomes

== Production ==
Neon Heart was produced by International House of Cinema (IHC), (Note: International House of Cinema (IHC) is an audiovisual production company founded in Curitiba (October 2012) by Lucas Estevan Soares. In 2017, with Rhaissa Gonçalves, established the second unit in Miami (USA).) with executive production of Rhaissa Gonçalves, Lucas Estevan Soares and Mehdi Avdi. IHC financed with its own resources 100% of the budget of R$ 1.5 million ($320,000) employed in the project, captured by its work developed in the United States. Faithful to the style of "guerrilla cinema", the independent production did not use public funding resources.

The feature film was shot in the second half of 2019 in Boqueirão, a neighborhood of the city of Curitiba, (Note: Boqueirão is a neighborhood located in the southwest region of Curitiba, and one of the largest in the capital of Paraná. The name "Boqueirão" ("big mouth") identified a well-known deep grave existing in the old Farm Boqueirão, property that originated the locality.) with post-production being carried out during the COVID-19 pandemic. First Brazilian film finished with Dolby Atmos technology, the film featured a cast entirely originated in the Curitiba art scene.

The idea for the project arose from the fascination of director Lucas Estevan Soares for singing telegram services, and hence imagine a chase involving one of these vehicles, affectionately called as "Boquelove" in the work, nickname of the Ford Corcel of blue color and year 1975 that gives name to the film.

== Soundtrack ==
Neon Heart soundtrack features several artists and musical styles, including the film's own production team.

1. "Só de Pensar" – Gustavo Andriewiski
2. "Olhos ao Chão" – Lucas Estevan Soares
3. "Senhor Compositor" – Cacá Ribeiro
4. "Tá Sabendo" – P.A & P.H
5. "# Boquera" – Lucas Estevan Soares
6. "Coração de Neon" – BellaDonna
7. "Em Busca Desse Mar" – Lucas Estevan Soares
8. "Voa Plena" – Lucas Estevan Soares, Willian San’Per
9. "Fui Tempestade" – Lucas Estevan Soares, Jotta Valiente
10. "Tô no Pique" – P.A & P.H

== Release ==
Neon Heart was first shown at the 55th edition of the Houston International Film Festival (WorldFest Houston), being awarded the Remi Trophy (Special Jury Award). After participating in film festivals in North America, Europe and Asia, he landed in Brazil at FestCine Pedra Azul, where he was also awarded.

Before entering the Brazilian commercial circuit, the feature film had a premiere at Teatro Positivo, in Curitiba, on March 5, 2023. The national premiere took place on March 9, 2023, with exhibition in 150 theaters around the country, and in April of the same year premiered in Argentina and Uruguay.

== Reception ==
At the 75th Marché du Film, Neon Heart was cited for the peculiarities "that qualify it between the art genre and the popular one", besides being appointed as representative of the "new Brazilian popular cinema".

Rolling Stone Brazil welcomed the "change of scenery", noting that it "takes the viewer away from scenarios already known by national cinema as São Paulo and Rio de Janeiro, and flees the cliché presenting a 'hidden' Curitiba and full of life in its suburbs.".

Exame Magazine highlighted the photograph: "Whether in the colors of the car, in the takes in the dark or even during the sunset, everything looks quite alive".

Cinepop awarded the film 4 stars (out of 5 possible), defining it as "a powerful drama that in a simple way, nothing inventive, presents its facts and developments of breaking a utopia and discovering other ways in knowing how to live".

Forum Magazine stated that "the film also corrects the way it portrays gender-motivated violence and how it contaminates society as a whole, but especially how it transforms – in a negative way – the lives of all those who live in the victim's universe. Nobody gets away with it.".

Among the review aggregators IMDb records, for the film, note "7,6 / 10", and AdoroCinema, "3,7 / 5".

== Awards and nominations ==
Year	Award	Category	Nominated work	Result
2022	55^{o} WorldFest-Houston International Film Festival	Remi Trophy (Special Jury Award)	Neon Heart	Won
2022	24^{o} RiverRun International Film Festival	RiverRun Audience Award	Neon Heart	Nominated
2022	19^{o} Big Apple Film Festival and Screenplay Competition (BAFF)	Best Feature Film	Neon Heart	Semi-finalist
2022	11^{o} Carmarthen Bay Film Festival (CBFF)	Feature Film	Neon Heart	Nominated
2022	Tokyo Lift-Off Film Festival		Neon Heart	Nominated
2022	44^{o} Moscow International Film Festival	Best Foreign Language Feature	Neon Heart	Won
2022	5^{o} FestCine Pedra Azul International Film Festival	Feature Film	Neon Heart	Won
2022	5^{o} FestCine Pedra Azul International Film Festival	Film Director	Lucas Estevan Soares	Won
2022	5^{o} FestCine Pedra Azul International Film Festival	Screenwriter	Lucas Estevan Soares	Won
2022	5^{o} FestCine Pedra Azul International Film Festival	Actress	Ana de Ferro	Nominated
2022	5^{o} FestCine Pedra Azul International Film Festival	Actor	Lucas Estevan Soares	Nominated
2022	5^{o} FestCine Pedra Azul International Film Festival	Cinematographer	Eduardo Ribeiro	Nominated
2022	31^{o} Cinequest Film & VR Festival	Drama	Neon Heart	Finalist
2022	5^{o} Nòt Film Fest	Shooting Star Features	Neon Heart	Nominated
2022	12^{o} Balneário Camboriú International Film Festival (BCIFF)	Features – Bilo Prize	Neon Heart	Nominated

== See also ==
- Independent film
