= The Butterfly Dance =

- Directed by: Max Reynal
- Written by: Max Reynal
- Produced by: David Klein
- Starring: Vera Farmiga; Phil Kauffmann; Reade Kelly
- Cinematography: Patrick Cady
- Edited by: Josh Apter
- Music by: James Walsh
- Release date: May 15, 1998 (Houston)
- Running time: 27 minutes
- Country: United States
- Language: English
- Budget: $35,000

The Butterfly Dance is a 1998 American short mystery drama film, written and directed by Max Reynal, and starring Vera Farmiga, Phil Kauffmann, and Reade Kelly. The film premiered at the WorldFest-Houston International Film Festival on May 15, 1998, where it won the Gold Remi Award for Best Dramatic Short. It then later screened at the Rhode Island International Film Festival.

== Plot ==
A freaky gardener. A scared young woman. A ghost. Things get a little strange as their small suburban lives go bump in the night.

== Cast ==
- Vera Farmiga as Diane
- Phil Kauffmann as Gabriel
- Reade Kelly as Father

== Accolades ==
Year	Award	Category	Recipient(s)	Result
1998	WorldFest-Houston International Film Festival	Gold Remi Award for Best Short Drama	The Butterfly Dance	Won
