= Yuri Marçal =

- Born: Yuri Marçal do Nascimento Maranhão; 15 May 1993 (age 33); Rio de Janeiro, Brazil
- Occupations: Actor, comedian
- Spouse: Jeniffer Dias

Yuri Marçal do Nascimento Maranhão, better known as just Yuri Marçal (born 15 May 1993) is a Brazilian comedian and actor. He graduated in a degree in Theatre and Television from the Escola de Atores Wolf Maya. He began his career in stand-up comedy in 2016, alongside humorist Fábio Rabin.

== Biography and career ==
Yuri Marçal was born on 15 May 1993 in Rio de Janeiro. He is of Nigerian, Angolan, Beninese, Gabonese, Sierra Leonean, North African, Ugandan, Kenyan, Irish, Maltese, and Indigenous background. He grew up in the Carobinha favela in the West Zone of the city. He studied law, but did not graduate. He later graduated with a degree in Theatre and Television from the Escola de Atores Wolf Maya. He began his career in comedy in 2016, alongside Rabin.

Marçal became known nationally for his stand-up comedy videos on YouTube. In 2018, he began a successful partnership with Porta dos Fundos, where he participated in the sketch Escravidão, later appearing in other sketches such as Escritor Branco, Cota, Despedida de Solteira, Jesus Hétero, and Tudo isso que tá aí, culminating in his participation in Especial de Natal Porta dos Fundos: Teocracia em Vertigem in 2020. In 2019, he made his debut in a comedy program, titled Acendam as Luzes. Today, he has participated in various projects in theatre, film, and streaming. In audiovisual media, Marçal made his debut in the series Homens? in 2020. He was also part of the cast of the series 5x Comédia (2021).

On Black Consciousness Day in 2021, Marçal, together with comedians Gui Preto, Kedny Silva, Helio de la Peña, Niny Magalhães, Paloma Santos, and Zete Brito, presented Risadas Pretas Importam at the Teatro Municipal de São Paulo marking a historic feat for the theatre. In 2022, Marçal played Wanderley (Diley) in the film Barraco de Família, directed by Mauricio Eça.

He was a co-presenter of the awarding ceremony of the Prêmio Sim à Igualdade Racial in 2023, together with Jeniffer Dias. Marçal currently performs stand-up comedy in various cities in Brazil and participates on television programs.

== Comedy Specials ==
=== Ledo Engano ===
Recorded in 2021 and released on 2 June 2022, Marçal made history as he became the first Black comedian in Brazil, and in 15 years of Netflix, to have a comedy special on streaming platforms when he debuted his special targeted towards young people under 18. It is available in 190 countries.

During the 59-minute special, he uses dark humor to discuss themes linked to family, racism, history, religion, and relationships.

=== Nem se minha vida dependesse disso ===
After a critical and public success, Marçal announced on social media that in 2023, he would record a new comedy special titled Nem se minha vida dependesse disso, which was recorded on 2 June 2023, exactly a year after his first special. The recording took place at Teatro Bradesco in São Paulo. The special was published on 6 September on YouTube.

== Filmography ==
=== Television ===
| Year | Title | Role | Note |
|---|---|---|---|
| 2020 | Homens? | Gael Santos | |
| 2020 | Diário de Um Confinado | Eduardo | Episode: "Reunião de Condomínio" |
| 2021 | 5X Comédia | Robinson | Episode: "Cinderella" |
| 2021 | Desjuntados | Marcinho | |
| 2021 | LOL: Se Rir, Já Era! | Participant (9th place) | Season 1 |
| 2022 | O Que Você Não Sabia Sobre o Humor Brasileiro | Yuri Marçal | |

=== Theatre ===
| Year | Title | Role | Nota |
|---|---|---|---|
| 2020 | Teocracia em Vertigem | Street vendor | |
| 2022 | Vale Night | Linguinha | |
| 2022 | Barba, Cabelo &amp; Bigode | Queijo Coalho | |
| 2023 | Barraco de Família | Wanderley (Diley) | |
| 2023 | Mussum, o Filmis | Carlinhos (Jovem) | |
| 2023 | União Instável | Juan | |
| 2024 | Cedo Demais | André | |
| 2025 | Câncer com Ascendente em Virgem | Famous Youtuber | |

== Awards ==
| Year | Awards | Category | Nomination | Results |
|---|---|---|---|---|
| 2023 | Prêmio Guarani de Cinema Brasileiro | Male Revelation | Vale Night | Nominated |
| 2023 | Festival de Cinema de Gramado | Best Supporting Actor | Mussum, o Filmis | Won |
| 2023 | Prêmio Potências! | Actor of the Year | Mussum, o Filmis | Nominated |
| 2024 | Festival Sesc Melhores Filmes | Best National Actor | Mussum, o Filmis | Nominated |
| 2024 | Prêmio Grande Otelo | Best Supporting Actor in Film | Mussum, o Filmis | Nominated |
