= Mussum, o Filmis =

2023 film by Sílvio Guindane

- Theatrical release poster
- Directed by: Silvio Guindane
- Written by: Paulo Cursino
- Based on: Mussum Forévis – Samba, Mé e Trapalhões by Juliano Barreto
- Produced by: André Carreira
- Starring: Aílton Graça; Yuri Marçal; Neusa Borges; Cacau Protásio; Cinara Leal; Gero Camilo
- Cinematography: Nonato Estrela
- Edited by: André Simões
- Music by: Max de Castro
- Production companies: Camisa Listrada; Globo Filmes; RioFilme
- Distributed by: Paris Filmes; Downtown Filmes
- Release date: 2 November 2023 (Brazil)
- Running time: 123 minutes
- Country: Brazil
- Language: Portuguese
- Budget: R$ 11 million
- Box office: R$ 4 198 257,05

Mussum, o Filmis is a 2023 Brazilian biographical drama film directed by Silvio Guindane, written by Paulo Cursino, and starring Ailton Graça as the comedian and musician Mussum. The cast also includes Yuri Marçal, Vanderlei Bernardino, Cacau Protásio, Neusa Borges, and Gero Camilo. The story revolves around the comedian’s childhood, early career, and rise to fame, depicting the challenges he faced in establishing himself in the field.

Mussum premiered at the 51st Gramado Film Festival on August 20, 2023, where it emerged as the festival’s big winner, taking home the awards for Best Film, Best Actor for Ailton Graça, Best Supporting Actress for Neusa Borges, Best Supporting Actor for Yuri Marçal, Best Original Score, and Best Film as voted by the audience, as well as an honorable mention. It was released in Brazilian theaters on November 2, 2023, by Downtown Filmes and Paris Filmes.

== Plot ==
Based on the book Mussum – uma história de Humor e Samba, by Juliano Barreto, published in 2023 by HarperCollins, the plot unfolds in three distinct stages. In the first phase, we are introduced to the childhood of Antônio Carlos Bernardes Gomes, formerly known as Carlinhos (Thawan Lucas Bandeira), living in modest circumstances alongside his mother, Mrs. Malvina (Cacau Protásio). Even in his youth, Carlinhos already showed a natural talent for music, although his mother disapproved, as he dreamed of becoming a soccer player.

The second part follows Carlinhos as an adult (Yuri Marçal), as he pursued a career in the Brazilian Air Force (FAB) while simultaneously launching his nighttime performances with the group Os Originais do Samba, keeping this a secret from his family. During this time, he meets his first wife, Nely (Jeniffer Dias), and begins to start his own family.

In the third and final phase, now known as Carlinhos (Ailton Graça), he began to gain prominence through his television appearances. During one of these appearances, he met Grande Otelo (Nando Cunha), who nicknamed him “Mussum”, a nickname that would make him famous throughout Brazil.

== Cast ==
- Aílton Graça as Mussum
  - Yuri Marçal as Carlinhos/ Mussum (young)
  - Thawan Lucas as Carlinhos/ Mussum (child)
- Neusa Borges as Mrs. Malvina Bernardes Gomes
  - Cacau Protásio as Malvina (young)
- Cinnara Leal as Neila da Costa Bernardes Gomes
- Luiza Rosa as Nancy Bernardes Gomes
- Késia Estácio as Leny Castro dos Santos
  - Jeniffer Dias as Leny (young)
- Édio Nunes as Bigode
  - Ângelo Fernandes as Bigode (young)
- Vanderlei Bernardino as Chico Anysio
- Gero Camilo as Renato Aragão
- Felipe Rocha as Dedé Santana
- Gustavo Nader as Zacarias
- Eduardo Lago as Carlos Machado
- Stepan Nercessian as Diógenes, RCA director
- Nando Cunha as Grande Otelo
- Larissa Luz as Elza Soares
- Clarice Paixão as Alcione
- Augusto Madeira as Boni
- Paulo Mathias Jr. as Maurício Sherman
- Ícaro Silva as Jorge Ben Jor
- Flávio Bauraqui as Cartola
- Christiano Torreão as Sargento Pincel
- Mary Sheila as Aunt Alaíde
- Alan Rocha as Rubão
  - Hugo Germano as Rubão (young)
- Lelé as Bidi
  - Kadu Costa as Bidi (young)
- Udylê Procópio as Chiquinho
  - Ângelo Emmanuel as Chiquinho (young)
- Deiwis Jamaica as Lelei
  - Reinaldo Júnior as Lelei (young)
- Wilson Simoninha as Garrincha
- Antônio Gonzalez as Wilton Franco
- Marcelo Picchi as Milton Carneiro
- Remo Rocha as Major Silva Lima
- Mussunzinho as Niltinho from Estação Primeira de Mangueira
- Edmilson Barros as bus stop passenger in the skit
- Gillray Coutinho as father of the bride in the skit
- Sérgio Loroza as samba circle singer

== Production ==
=== Pre-production ===
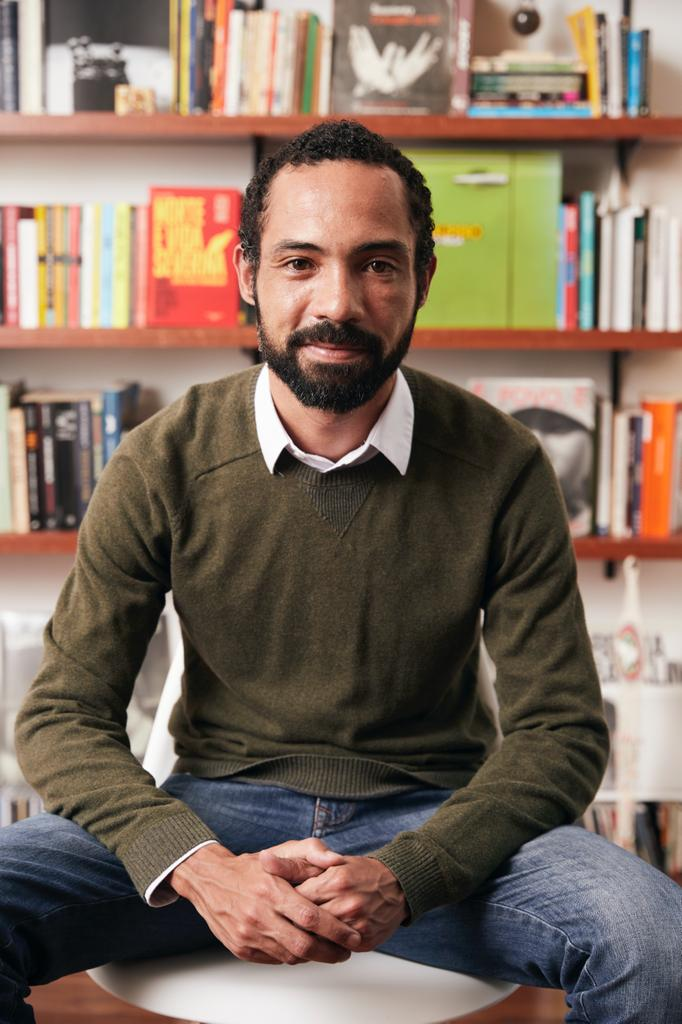
The film marks Silvio Guindane's directorial debut.

According to Silvio Guindane, the film seeks to transcend a mere biography and establish itself as a story that resonates with the lives of millions of Brazilians. From his early struggles at a school for white students, with his mother encouraging her son to stand out and be the best, emphasizing that he is no less than anyone else. From the acclaimed musician with the samba group Os Originais do Samba and in comedian with the group Os Trapalhões who addresses the children participating in the Mangueira do Futuro project—an educational initiative linked to the Rio de Janeiro samba school, Estação Primeira de Mangueira—encouraging them to persevere in their dreams, emphasizing that they are capable of achieving anything. Using Mrs. Malvina’s mantra, mother of Mussum, he repeats: “No one can take away your dreams. You can do anything. Because there are plenty of dumb white people out there. But a dumb black person? That’s a no-go.”

Furthermore, Guindane faces the paradoxical challenge of telling a story that isn’t exactly new to some generations. The film is based on the book Mussum – uma história de Humor e Samba by Juliano Barreto, who is also involved in the screenplay. The director brings together a predominantly Black cast to share a story that appeals to both those who already know it and those discovering it now. The film addresses themes such as the value of family, the pursuit of knowledge as a tool for choice and power in work and life, and the fight against prejudice. It took seven years of work to bring Mussum, o Filmis to the screen.

=== Development ===
The film was initially directed by producer Roberto Santucci of Panorama Filmes. However, Guindane was contacted by Santucci, who encouraged him to take over as director because he had a more intimate perspective on the story. With Ailton Graça already confirmed as the lead, Guindane rounded out the cast with prominent actresses such as Neusa Borges and Cacau Protásio in the roles of the comedian’s mother at different stages of his life, as well as actors Gero Camilo as Renato Aragão and Yuri Marçal as the young version of Mussum before he became famous. The first studio photos showed a striking resemblance between Ailton Graça and Mussum. Guindane notes that there were intense rehearsals to ensure that Graça truly embodied Mussum’s spirit, which was naturally reflected in his gestures and dialogue during filming.

In February 2022, filming began on the feature film, with Ailton Graça, Cacau Protásio, Neusa Borges, Yuri Marçal, and Thawan Lucas confirmed as part of the cast. In an interview, on TV Globo’s, Altas Horas program, hosted by Serginho Groisman, the actor described the atmosphere behind the scenes of the film’s production as lively. Starting in the mornings, the makeup room became a joyful place filled with drumming and samba singing, and at the end of each day’s filming, there were plenty of tributes to Mussum. In an interview with journalist Carlos Oliveira of the newspaper O Estado de S. Paulo, Ailton remarked that at six in the morning, “everyone was drumming and singing samba.”

=== Movie title ===
The film plays with a series of puns by Mussum, which consist of a highly systematic comedic technique known as “Mussunguês,” that operates primarily through a morphophonological distortion of standard Portuguese. The central mechanism is the parodic affixation of the suffix “-is” (or variations such as “-dis,” “-zis,” or “-vis”) to nouns, adjectives, verbs, and adverbs, simulating a scholarly or Latinized hypercorrection that contrasts absurdly with the popular, roguish register often associated with cachaça (the “mé extra-fortis”). This pragmatic incongruity, the pretense of sounding sophisticated while completely subverting standard language—generates humor through the theory of incongruity, reinforced by elements of macaronism (a mixture of Portuguese with distorted English, as in “tá de brincation uite me?”) and a samba-like rhythm. Classic phrases like “Tá tudo muito paradis,” “Cacildis!” or “Fim di semanis” exemplify this invented grammar, which transforms cultural traits of the Rio rogue into a mark of comic, making the style not just a sound pun, but a deeply Brazilian parody of identity and language.

=== Release ===
The film premiered in August 2023 at the 51st Gramado Film Festival. The film had gala screenings during the Rio de Janeiro International Film Festival, the São Paulo International Film Festival, and at an event in Belo Horizonte, Minas Gerais, as well as a public screening at the Mangueira samba school’s parade ground. On November 1, the film had a national preview screening at the 5th Santos Geek Festival, at the SESC Santos Theater, in Santos, a coastal city in the state of São Paulo. The theatrical release took place on November 2, 2023, distributed by the production companies Downtown Filmes and Paris Filmes.

== Soundtrack ==
The official soundtrack for Mussum: O Filmis was released by Downtown Filmes via a playlist on its official Spotify profile.

- "Falador Passa Mal" — Os Originais do Samba
- "Tenha Fé, Pois Amanhã um Lindo Dia Vai Nascer" — Os Originais do Samba
- "Enlouqueci" — Os Originais do Samba
- "Do Lado Direito da Rua Direita" — Os Originais do Samba
- "Você Me Vira a Cabeça (Me Tira do Sério)" — Alcione
- "Faz uma Loucura por Mim" — Alcione
- "Meu Ébano" — Alcione
- "O Mar Serenou" — Clara Nunes
- "Canto das Três Raças" — Clara Nunes
- "Cadê Tereza (Mono)" — Os Originais do Samba
- "Tema dos Trapalhões (Abertura)"
- "Piruetas" — Os Trapalhões and Chico Buarque
- "Esperanças Perdidas" — Os Originais do Samba
- "Alô, Alô Marciano" — Elis Regina
- "Sufoco" — Alcione
- "Não Deixa o Samba Morrer" — Os Originais do Samba
- "Canto Chorado" — Os Originais do Samba
- "Tragédia no Fundo do Mar (O Assassinato do Camarão)" — Os Originais do Samba
- "Pirão e Colher de Pau" — Os Originais do Samba
- "O Ouro e a Madeira" — Os Originais do Samba
- "Tudo é Alegria" — Os Originais do Samba
- "Atrás da Verde e Rosa Só Não Vai Quem Já Morreu" — Estação Primeira de Mangueira and Jamelão
- "O Século do Samba" — Estação Primeira de Mangueira and Jamelão
- "Olimpo é Verde e Rosa" — Estação Primeira de Mangueira and Jamelão

== Reception ==
=== Box Office ===
Mussum, O Filmis was a commercial success. With wide distribution in over 1,180 movie theaters across the country, the film achieved the distinction of being one of the most-watched Brazilian productions of 2023. According to data from Agência Nacional do Cinema (Ancine), the film was seen by 212,628 viewers, generating revenue of R$ 4.198.057,05.

=== Critical ===
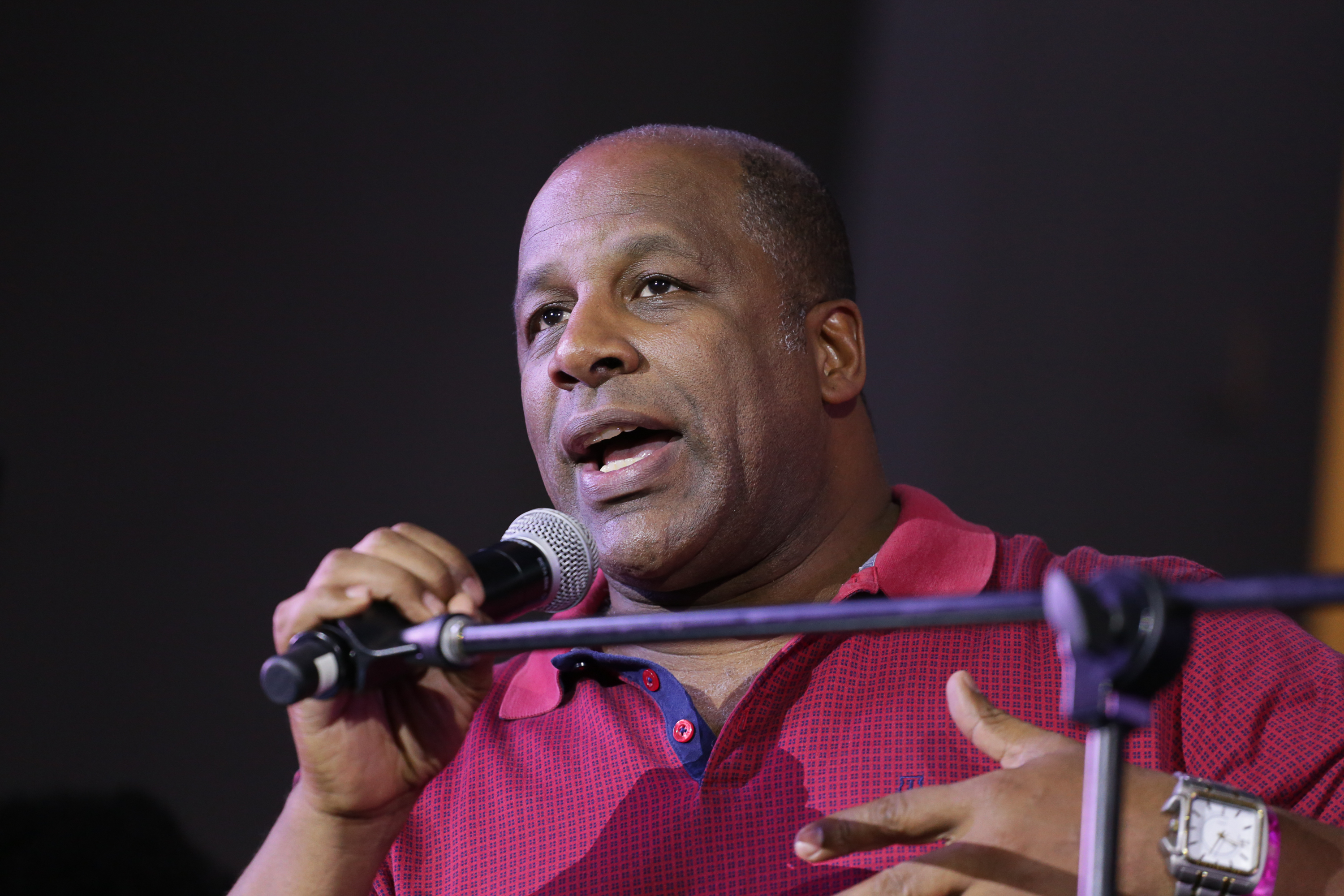
Ailton Graça’s performance in the title role was highlighted by several critics as the film’s strongest point.

André Zuliani, from the culture website Omelete, gave the film a positive review, awarding it four out of five stars. He praised Ailton Graça’s performance, stating that “he made this biopic the crowning achievement of his career,” and added, “Almost 30 years after the star’s death, Mussum: O Filmis proves to be a necessary biopic about one of the leading icons of Brazilian comedy.” Ticiano Osório, writing for the Rio Grande do Sul newspaper Zero Hora, gave the film a positive review, praising its “nostalgic” appeal and noting: “As the catchphrases suggest, Mussum: O Filmis uses humor to address serious issues.”

Daniel Schenker, of the newspaper O Globo, gave the film a mixed review, praising certain choices but criticizing the screenplay: "There is, however, a considerable gap between the performances and Paulo Cursino’s screenplay, which relies on tired tropes. The structure is the same as in other films: it begins at a pivotal moment in the protagonist’s life (in this case, when his mother’s health deteriorates), flashes back in time, and then moves forward relative to the initial moment. This approach highlights the bond between Mussum and his mother, but as the film progresses, that bond loses prominence. Without a clear focus, the screenplay ends up merely stringing together the events of the comedian’s life."

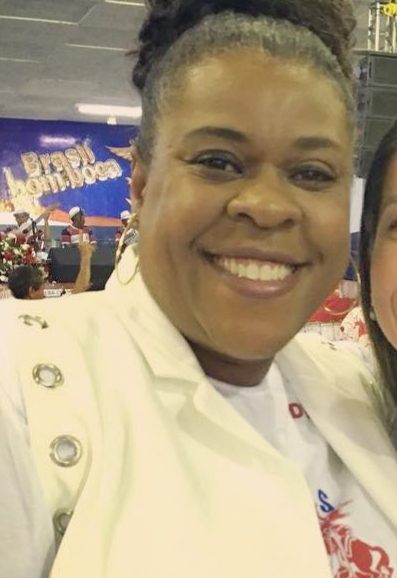
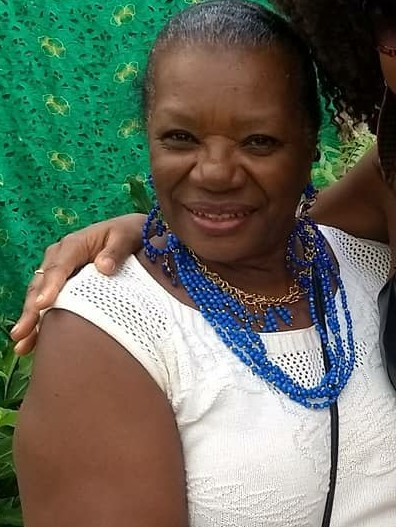
The performances of Cacau Protásio and Neusa Borges were also praised.

Maurício Meireles, of the Folha de S. Paulo newspaper, gave the film three out of five stars. The journalist described the cast as “formidable,” but criticized the film for “failing to directly address the issues of racism that the comedian faced throughout his career.”

Célio Silva, wrote a positive review of the G1, praised Guindane’s poise as a director: “In his directorial debut, Guindane shows poise in both the funniest and most dramatic moments, as if he were already a veteran director.”

Raquel Martins Ribeiro, writing for the Metrópoles website, described the film as excellent. She noted that “Mussum, the filmmaker, also succeeds in addressing issues such as racism and elitism in such a subtle and humorous way that it might go unnoticed by some viewers. And wasn’t it precisely with this lightness that the comedian tackled the most sensitive topics?”.

=== Prizes ===
Prize List
Year	Association(s)	Category(ies)	Nominee(s)	Result	Ref.
2023	Festival de Cinema de Gramado	Best Feature Film – Jury Award	Mussum, o Filmis	Won	
2023	Festival de Cinema de Gramado	Best Feature Film – Popular Vote	Mussum, o Filmis	Won	
2023	Festival de Cinema de Gramado	Best Actor	Aílton Graça	Won	
2023	Festival de Cinema de Gramado	Best Supporting Actor	Yuri Marçal	Won	
2023	Festival de Cinema de Gramado	Best Supporting Actress	Neusa Borges	Won	
2023	Festival de Cinema de Gramado	Best Original Score	Max de Castro	Won	
2023	Festival de Cinema de Gramado	Best Characterization – Honorable Mention	Martin Macias Trujillo	Won	
2023	Veja Rio - Cariocas do Ano	Cinema	Aílton Graça	Won	
2023	Potências Award	Actor of the Year	Aílton Graça	Nominated	
2023	Potências Award	Actor of the Year	Yuri Marçal	Nominated	
2023	Potências Award	Actress of the Year	Neusa Borges	Nominated	
2024	Sesc Best Films Festival	Best Domestic Film	Mussum, o Filmis	Nominated	
2024	Sesc Best Films Festival	Best National Actor – People's Choice Award	Aílton Graça	Won	
2024	Sesc Best Films Festival	Best National Actor – Jury Vote	Aílton Graça	Won	
2024	Sesc Best Films Festival	Best National Actor – Jury Vote	Yuri Marçal	Nominated	
2024	Sesc Best Films Festival	Best Brazilian Actress – Jury Vote	Cacau Protásio	Nominated	
2024	Sesc Best Films Festival	Best Brazilian Actress – Jury Vote	Neusa Borges	Nominated	
2024	ABC Cinematography Award	Best Sound in a Fiction Feature Film	Evandro Lima, Rodrigo Noronha, Gustavo Loureiro, Acácia Lima and Tomás Alem	Won	
2024	ABC Cinematography Award	Best Editing in a Fiction Feature Film	André Simões	Nominated	
2024	ABRA Screenplay Award	Best Adapted Screenplay	Paulo Cursino	Nominated	
2024	2024 Grande Otelo Award for Brazilian Cinema	Best Film	Mussum, o Filmis	Nominated	
2024	2024 Grande Otelo Award for Brazilian Cinema	Best Directorial Debut	Silvio Guindane	Won	
2024	2024 Grande Otelo Award for Brazilian Cinema	Best Actor	Aílton Graça	Won	
2024	2024 Grande Otelo Award for Brazilian Cinema	Best Supporting Actress	Cacau Protásio	Nominated	
2024	2024 Grande Otelo Award for Brazilian Cinema	Best Supporting Actor	Yuri Marçal	Nominated	
2024	2024 Grande Otelo Award for Brazilian Cinema	Best Cinematography	Nonato Estrela	Nominated	
2024	2024 Grande Otelo Award for Brazilian Cinema	Best Adapted Screenplay	Paulo Cursino	Nominated	
2024	2024 Grande Otelo Award for Brazilian Cinema	Best Costume Design	Cássio Brasil	Won	
2024	2024 Grande Otelo Award for Brazilian Cinema	Best Makeup	Martin Macias Trujillo and Mari Pin	Won	
2024	2024 Grande Otelo Award for Brazilian Cinema	Best Visual Effects	José Francisco Neto	Nominated	
2024	2024 Grande Otelo Award for Brazilian Cinema	Best Editing	André Simões	Nominated	
2024	2024 Grande Otelo Award for Brazilian Cinema	Best Sound	Evandro Lima, Rodrigo Noronha, Gustavo Loureiro, Acácia Lima and Tomás Alem	Nominated	
