= Très Court International Film Festival =

Film festival

- Founded: 1999
- Awards: Grand Prix
- Website: trescourt.com

The Très Court International Film Festival (the Très Court, formerly the International Festival of Very Shorts) is a film festival which takes place annually in June in multiple cities simultaneously. It is dedicated to short films that are no longer than four minutes. Each year, around 2 000 international short films are screened in competition and of those around 140, or 7% are screened at the festival, of which a much smaller number will be awarded one of the various awards available that year.

The event is held in over 20 countries. In 2018, 30,000 people attended the Festival, including 10,000 in France.

== History ==
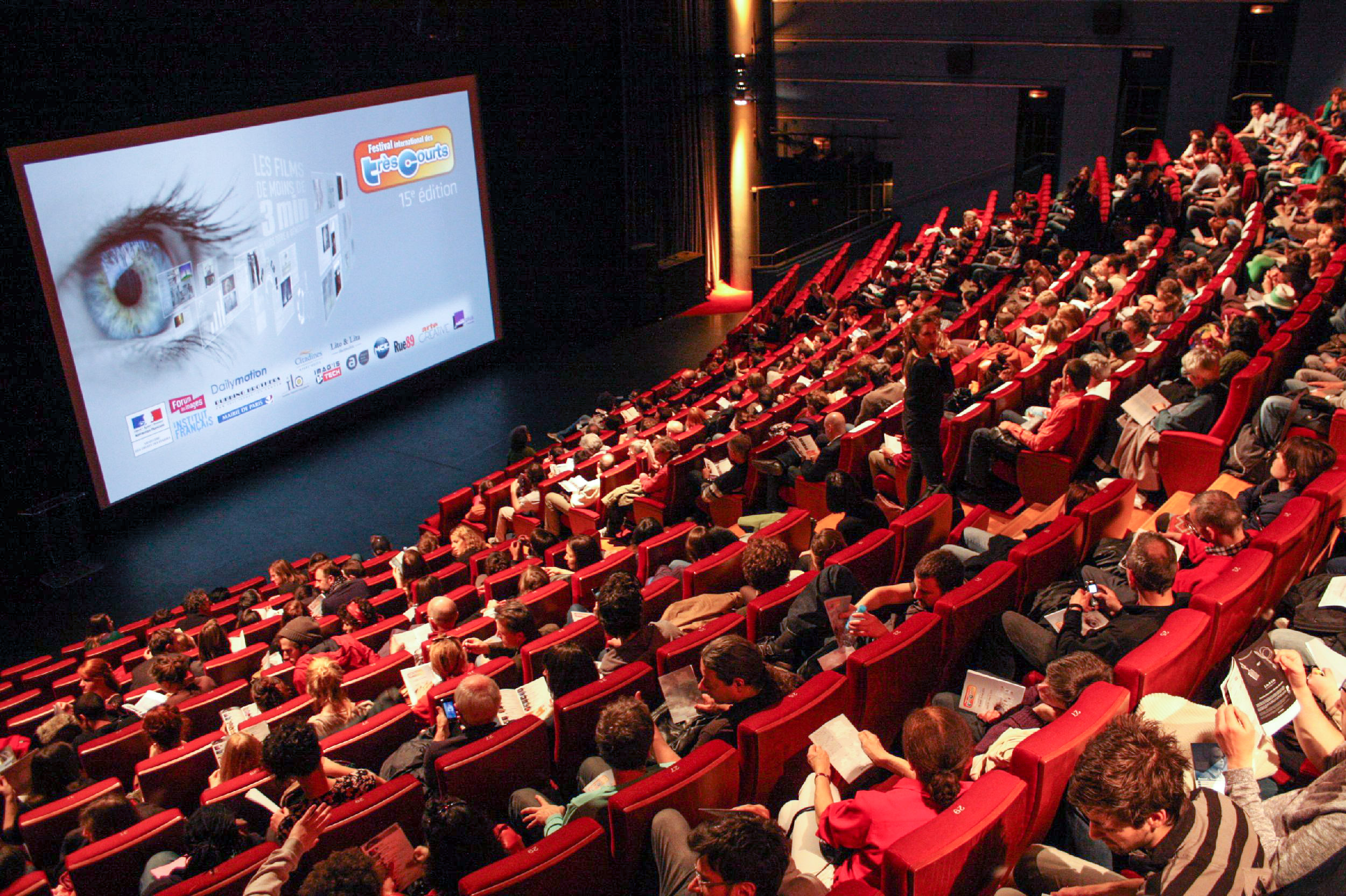
Très Court International Film Festival - Forum des images - Paris - May 3, 2013

The International Festival of Very Shorts was created in 1999 by Marc Bati and Pascal Toutain. The Festival was originally dedicated to films that were no longer than 3 minutes.

The first edition took place in Paris, France at the Forum des Images in October 1999.

From 2002 onward, the Festival was implemented in other cities in France. In 2005, the Festival reached an international audience, as screenings were organized in Switzerland and Belgium.

In 2009, the Women's Words program was created by Katia Martin Maresco.

The Festival was renamed in 2014 and became the Très Court International Film Festival.

The French program was created in 2018.

== Organization of the Festival ==
International coordination is managed from Paris by the Tout en Très Court organization.

The Festival is backed by multiple public agencies and private companies, such as the Ministry of Women's Rights, the Centre national du cinéma et de l'image animée and Canal+.

== Program ==
In Competition :

- International Competition (International cinema)
- Women’s Words Competition (Films centred around women)

Out of competition :

- Family Program (Children's films)
- French Program (French cinema)
- "They Dared" Program (Provocative and subversive films)

Former programs :

- Music'n'Dance Program (Music videos) from 2014 to 2017
- Travelling 34 Program (Films about disabilities) from 2012 to 2017
- Webseries Program (Episodes from webseries) in 2016
- "Monde d'avant, Monde d'après" Program (Films that depict a societal change) in 2012

== Awards ==
- Grand Prix Awarded to the best short in the International competition
- Originality Award Awarded to the most original short in the International competition
- Animation Award Awarded to the best animation short in the International competition
- Women’s Rights Award Awarded to the best short in the Women's Words competition
- Audience Award Awarded after all the attendees voted for their favorite short film
- Canal+ Award

== Participating countries ==
- Africa : Egypt, Togo
- Americas : Canada, Chile, Ecuador, Panama, Peru, Martinique
- Asia : China, India
- Europe : England, Estonia, France, Greece, Ireland, Iceland, Italy, Netherlands, Romania, Slovakia, Spain, Switzerland, Turkey
- Oceania : New Caledonia

== The jury presidents ==
Each year, a president is chosen to chair the jury of the official selection of the festival.

- 1999 : Moebius, cartoonist
- 2000 : Charlélie Couture, singer
- 2001 : Patrick Bouchitey, director
- 2002 : Gustave Parking, comedian
- 2003 : Jean-Michel Ribes, director
- 2004 : Emma de Caunes, actress
- 2005 : Pierre Richard, comedian
- 2006 : Gerard Krawczyk, director
- 2007 : Claude Chabrol, director
- 2008 : Yves Boisset, director
- 2009 : Jean-Loup Hubert, director
- 2010 : Philippe Muyl, director
- 2011 : Nicolas Altmayer, producer
- 2012 : Jean-François Halin, writer
- 2013 : Marianne Slot, producer
- 2014 : Bruno Putzulu, comedian
- 2015 : Pascale Ferran, director
- 2016 : Aure Atika, comedian
- 2017 : Nicolas Boukhrief, director
- 2018 : Éric Judor, comedian
- 2019 : Michel Hazanavicius, director
