= Neusa Borges =

Brazilian actress and singer (born 1941)

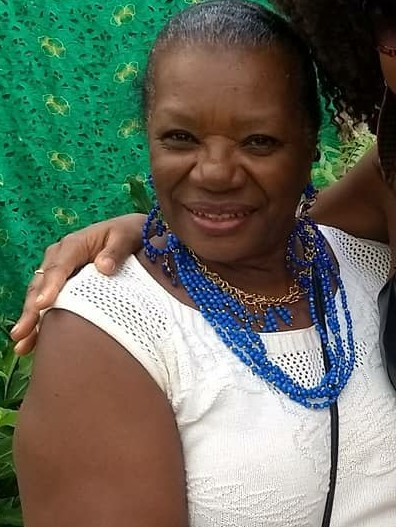
- Born: Neusa Maria da Silva Borges; 8 March 1941 (age 85); Florianópolis, Santa Catarina, Brazil
- Occupation: Actress
- Years active: 1969–present
- Spouse: Miguel Antônio

Neusa Maria da Silva Borges (born 8 March 1941) is a Brazilian actress. Known for her roles in television, she has won an APCA for Best Supporting Actress for her role in De Corpo e Alma, as well as an award by Contigo! for best supporting actress in A Indomada.

== Biography ==
Born in Florianópolis and raised in Piquete, São Paulo, Borges began her career in São Paulo as a crooner in an orchestra. She worked with such maestros as Clóvis Lima and Salgado Filho, always in a singing and dancing role.

Her transition to roles in television came with appearing in the Rede Record telenovela Venha ver o sol na estrada with Márcia de Windsor. At the beginning of her career, she acted in Beto Rockfeller on the now-defunct Rede Tupi, then went on to act in minor roles until she joined Rede Globo, where she landed major roles in telenovelas such as Escrava Isaura, Dona Xepa, Dancin' Days, and A Indomada. She has been a constant presence in Gloria Perez productions, namely Carmem, De Corpo e Alma, O Clone, Caminho das Índias, Amazônia, de Galvez a Chico Mendes, América, and Salve Jorge. During her career, she has won dozens of prizes. In 2009, she participated in the music video for the Maria Gadú song Dona Cila. In 2020, she starred as Bernadete in the series Auto Posto.

== Personal life ==
In 2003, during a performance by the Unidos da Tijuca samba school, Borges fell from one of the parade floats and suffered a pelvic fracture. The float she had been on had several issues since the beginning of the performance, including a broken wheel. After the accident, she was lifted by firefighters and taken to Souza Aguiar hospital in downtown Rio de Janeiro. She underwent emergency surgery and had to have 22 bolts in her pelvis and a titanium plate on her knee. She sued the samba school and was compensated with 700,000 reais for her injuries.

Borges is known for being an extremely sincere and truthful person. She owned a thrift store in Salvador, where she lives, but ultimately sold the business in 2021.

== Filmography ==
=== Television ===
Year	Show	Role	Notes
1972	Vitória Bonelli	Neusa	
1973	Venha Ver o Sol na Estrada	Cibele	
1976	Escrava Isaura	Rita	
1977	Dona Xepa	Rosemary	
1978	Dancin' Days	Madalena de Jesus (Madá)	
1979	Plantão de Polícia	Jussara	Episode: "O Estrangulador da Praça Tiradentes"
1980	O Meu Pé de Laranja Lima	Eugênia	
1986	Selva de Pedra	Creusa	
1990	Rainha da Sucata	Carcereira Inês	Episode: "2–13 de agosto"
1990	Mãe de Santo	Dona Conceição	
1992	Pedra sobre Pedra	Pombagira	Special participation
1992	De Corpo e Alma	Tereza dos Anjos (Terê)	
1993	Você Decide		Episode: "Anjos Marginais"
1994	Quatro por Quatro	Teresa	
1996	O Rei do Gado	Marta	Special participation
1997	A Indomada	Florência de Sousa	
1998	Você Decide	Marlene	Episode: "Trabalho Escravo"
1999	Você Decide	Dona Lalinha	Episode: "Na Passarela do Samba"
2000	Você Decide	Mãe Preta	Episode: "A Mãe Preta"
2001	O Clone	Dalva Fróes	
2005	América	Divinéia Feitosa (Diva)	
2007	A Diarista	Jupiara dos Santos	Episode: "Mãe Só Tem Duas"
2007	Amazônia, de Galvez a Chico Mendes	Josefa (Zefinha)	
2008	Casos e Acasos	Empregada	Episode: "O Triângulo, a Tia Raquel e o Pedido"
2008	Casos e Acasos	Carmen	Episode: "A Escolha, a Operação e a Outra"
2008	Alice	Gildete	Episode: "Wonderland"
2009	Caminho das Índias	Iracema de Souza (Cema)	
2011	Araguaia	Ivete Valadares	
2011	A Vida da Gente	Maria Gomes	
2012	Salve Jorge	Divinéia Feliciano da Silva (Diva)	
2014	Boogie Oogie	Madame Naná	Episode: "20–27 de dezembro"
2016	Escrava Mãe	Mãe Quitéria	Episode: "31 de maio-3 de junho"
2018	Xilindró	Marilack	Episode: "O Juíz"
2018	Valor da Vida	Roseli Ferreira Rocha	
2019	Sob Pressão	Lindacir Pinheiro da Silva	Episode: "30 de maio"
2020	Auto Posto	Bernadete	
2022	Encantado's	Tia Ambrósia Ponza	
2023	Histórias (Im)Possíveis	Benedita (Benê)	Episode: "Levante"

=== Film ===
Year	Title	Role	Notes
1970	A Moreninha		Voice only
1975	Bacalhau	Carmem	
1988	Romance da Empregada	Manicure	
2001	A Hidden Life	Jovina	
2004	The Hero	Flora	
2013	Aos Ventos que Virão	Velha Joaquina	
2023	Mussum, o Filmis	Malvina Bernardes Gomes	
2023	As Aparecidas	Amiga de Otília	
2024	A Festa de Léo	Dona Nazica (Bisa)	

=== Video clips ===
Year	Title	Artist
2009	Dona Cila	Maria Gadú

=== Theatre ===
- 1969 - Hair
- 1972 - A Capital Federal
- 1973 - A Parede
- 1974 - A Mulher que Mordeu a Careca de Santo Antônio
- 1974 - Mariquinha e José de Souza Leão
- 1974 - A Sedutora Maldita
- 1976 - A Moça que Beijou um Jumento Pensando em Roberto Carlos
- 1976 - Antônio de Lisboa e as Sereias do Fundo do Mar
- 1976 - Inferno e Sertão
- 1976 - São Jorge Contra os Invasores da Lua
- 1978 - A Ópera do Malandro
- 1980 - Tempo Bom

== Awards and distinctions ==
Year	Award	Category	Nomination	Result
1992	APCA Television Award	Best supporting actress	De Corpo e Alma	Won
1997	Prêmio Contigo! de TV	Best Supporting Actress	A Indomada	Won
2005	Diploma Comigo Ninguém Pode	Best Supporting Actress	América	Won
2008	Prêmio Arte Qualidade Brasil	Best Supporting Actress in Film	Polaróides Urbanas	Nominated
2009	Prêmio Top of Business	Best Actress	Caminho das Índias	Won
2023	Festival de Gramado	Best Supporting Actress	Mussum, o Filmis	Won
2023	Prêmio Potências!	Actress of the Year	Mussum, o Filmis	Pending
