= Cacau Protásio =

Brazilian actress and comedian

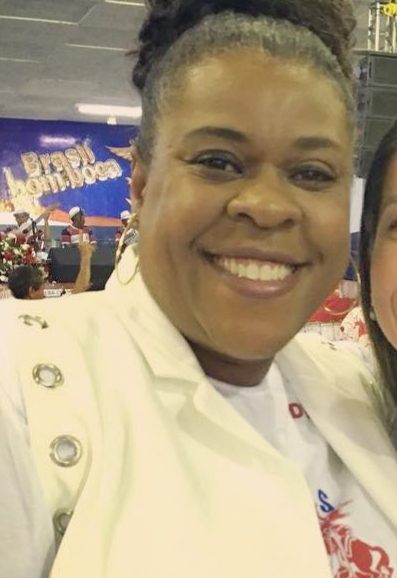
- Protásio in 2018
- Born: Anna Cláudia Protásio Monteiro; June 3, 1975 (age 49); Campos dos Goytacazes, Rio de Janeiro, Brazil
- Occupation(s): Actress, comedian
- Years active: 2000–present
- Spouse: Janderson Pires (m. 2015)

Anna Cláudia Protásio Monteiro (born June 3, 1975), known professionally as Cacau Protásio, is a Brazilian actress and comedian.

== Filmography ==
Television
Year	Title	Role
2004	The Aspones	
2005	A Diarista	
2010–2011	Ti Ti Ti	Fátima
2012	Avenida Brasil	Zezé
2012	Amor e Sexo	Herself
2012	Programa do Jô	Herself
2012	Vídeo Show	Herself
2012–2016	Encontro com Patrícia Poeta	Herself
2013	Dança dos Famosos 10	Herself
2013–2014	Joia Rara	Lindinha
2013–	Vai Que Cola	Terezinha
2014–2015	Trair e Coçar é Só Começar	Olímpia
2015	Vai Que Cola: O Filme	Terezinha
2017	The Noite com Danilo Gentili	Herself
2018	Mister Brau	Carmo
2018	Vai Anitta	Herself
2018–2023	Fantástico	Herself
2019	Conversa com Bial	Herself
2025	The Masked Singer Brasil	Dona Lurdes (from Amor de Mãe)
