= Pedra Azul State Park =

State park in Espírito Santo, Brazil

- Parque Estadual de Pedra Azul
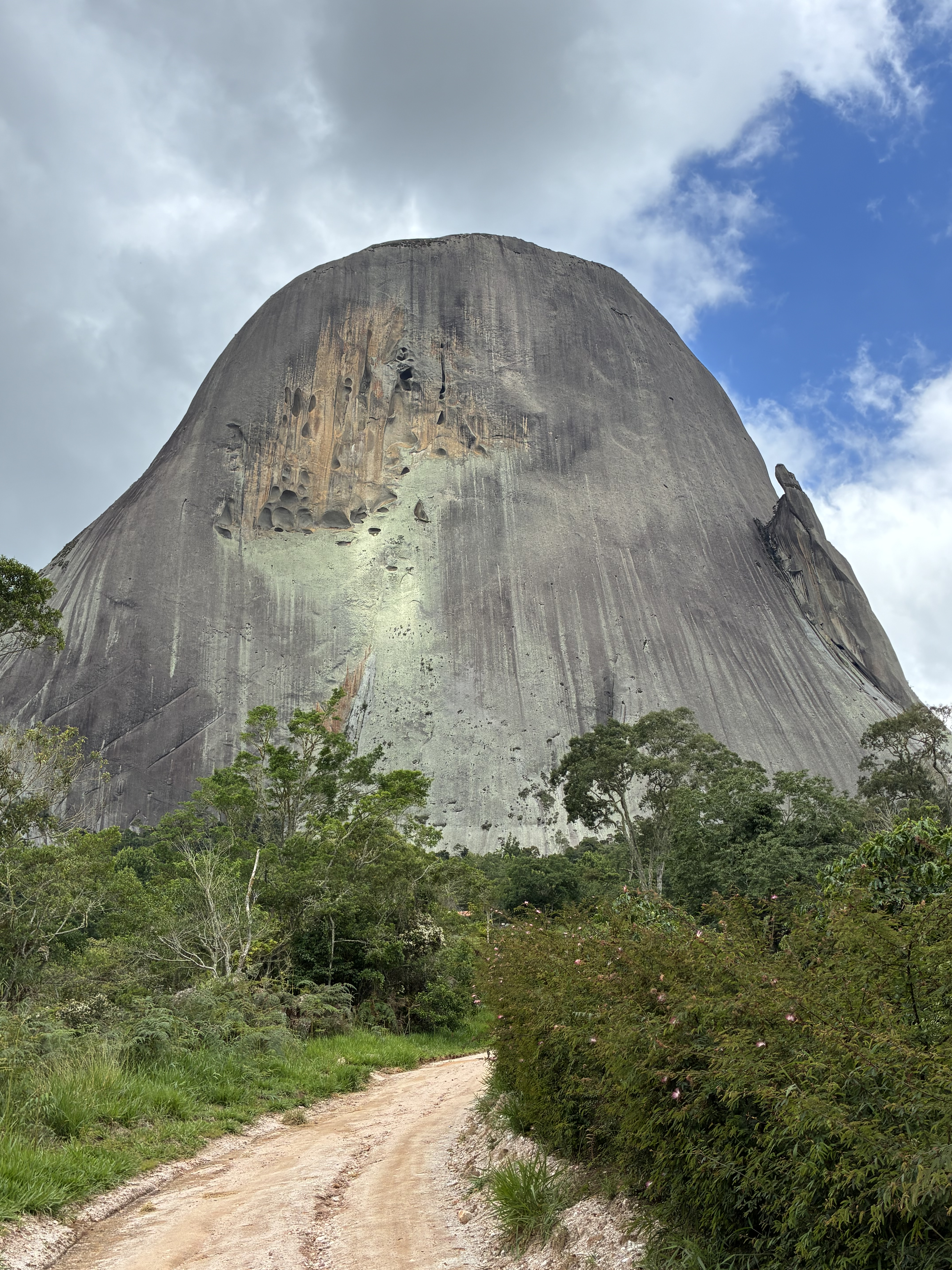
- Pedra Azul in the state park

- Location within Brazil
- Nearest city: Venda Nova do Imigrante, Espírito Santo
- Coordinates: 20°24′07″S 41°01′26″W
- Area: 1,240 hectares (3,100 acres)
- Designation: State park
- Created: 1991

Pedra Azul State Park (Portuguese: Parque Estadual de Pedra Azul) is a state park in the state of Espírito Santo, Brazil. Law 4,503 of January 2, 1991, transformed the reserve into Pedra Azul State Park, with an area of 1,240 hectares. The predominant biome of this Brazilian conservation unit is dense antimontane rainforest.

== Location ==
The Pedra Azul State Park was created in 1991 to protect the natural heritage of the region, and in particular the Pedra Azul (Blue Stone), a granite rock formation reaching a height of 1,822 metres (5,978 ft). The park covers 1,240 hectares (3,100 acres). Temperatures range from about 7.3 to 27.8 °C (45.1 to 82.0 °F). Altitude ranges from 1,250 metres (4,100 ft) at the visitor center to 1,909 metres (6,263 ft) at the peak of Pedra das Flores, the highest point. The park covers parts of the municipalities of Domingos Martins and Vargem Alta. It became part of the Central Atlantic Forest Ecological Corridor, created in 2002.

== Gallery ==
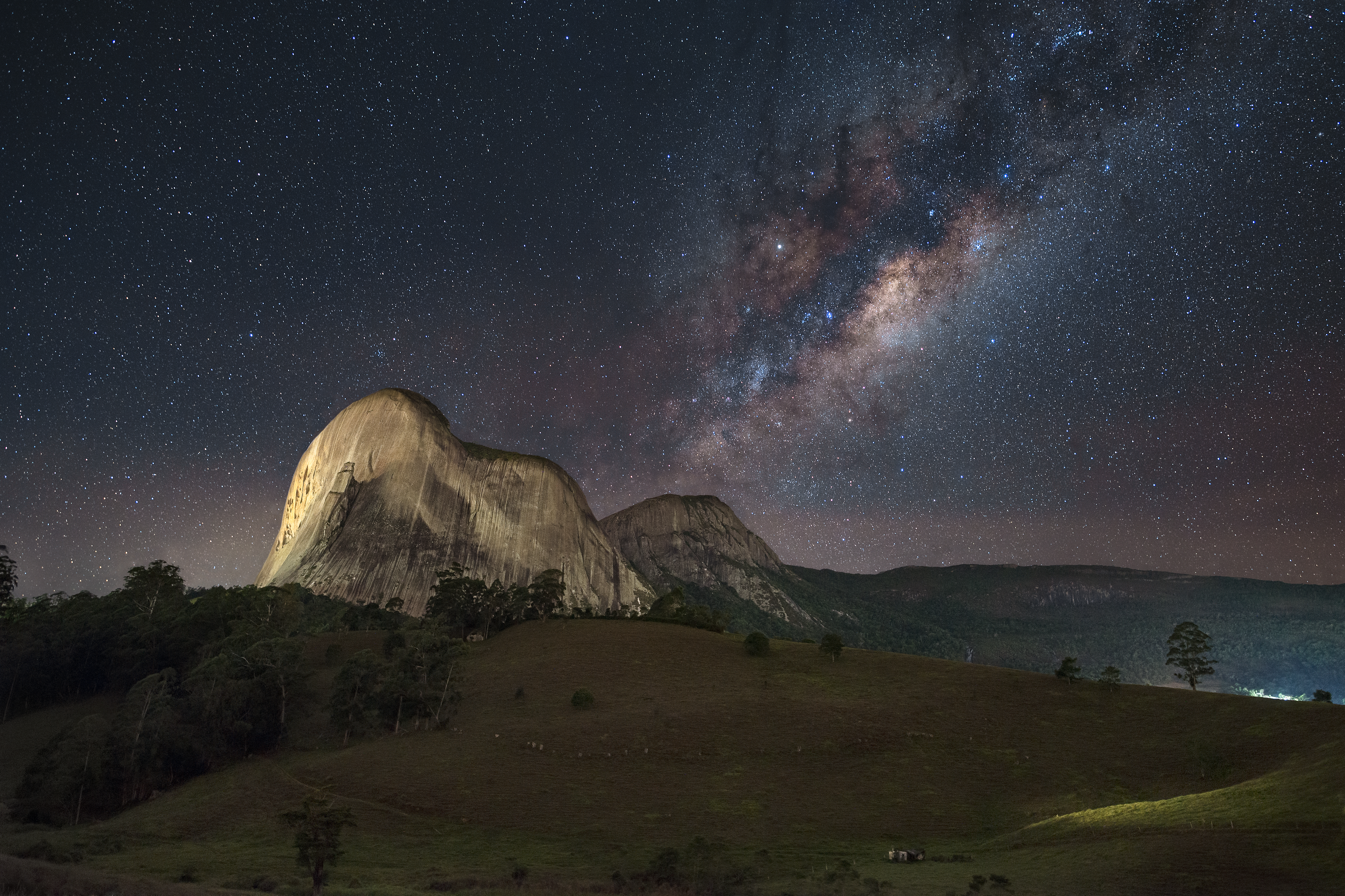
Pedra Azul beneath the Milky Way

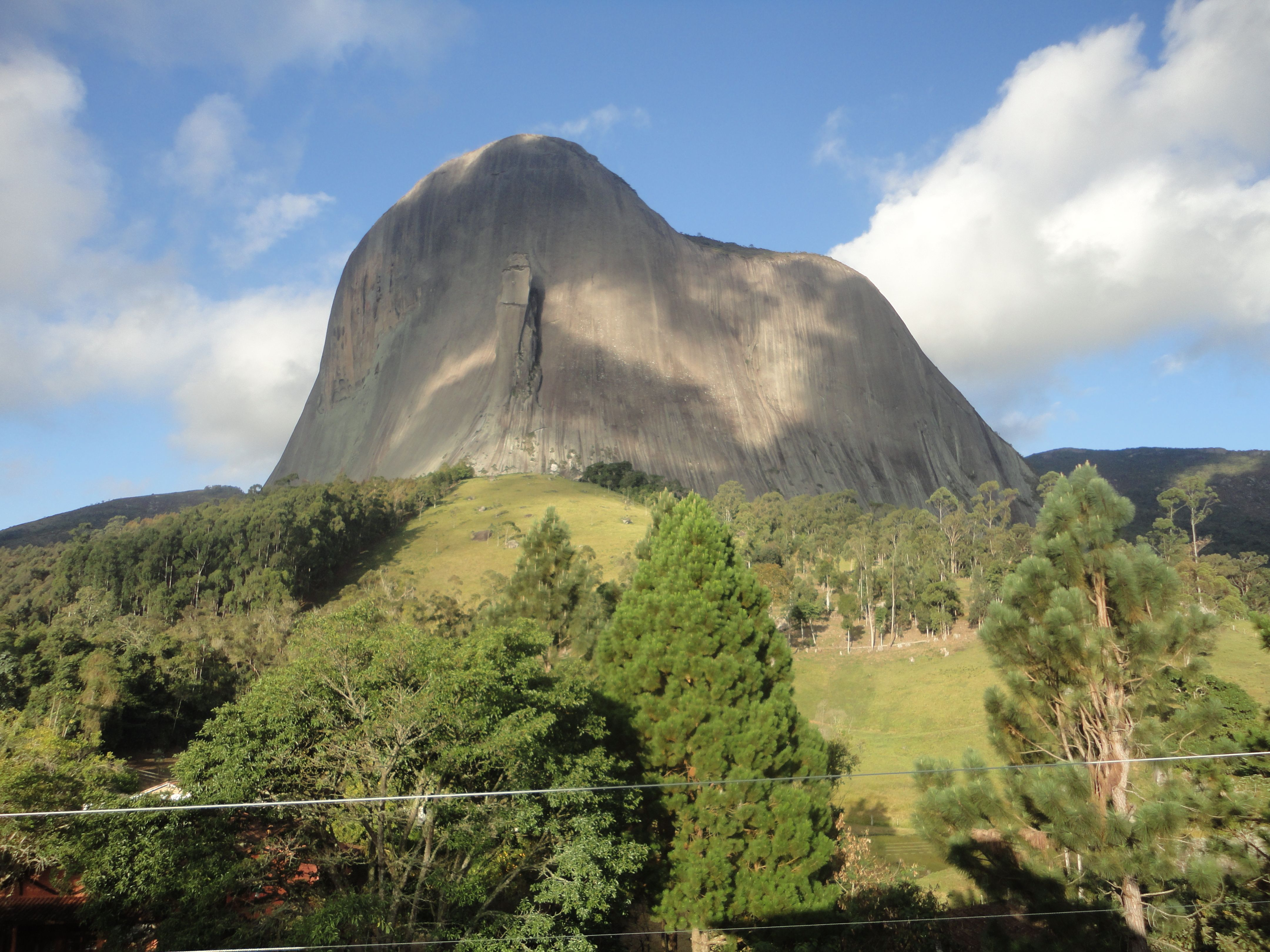
The blue Rock

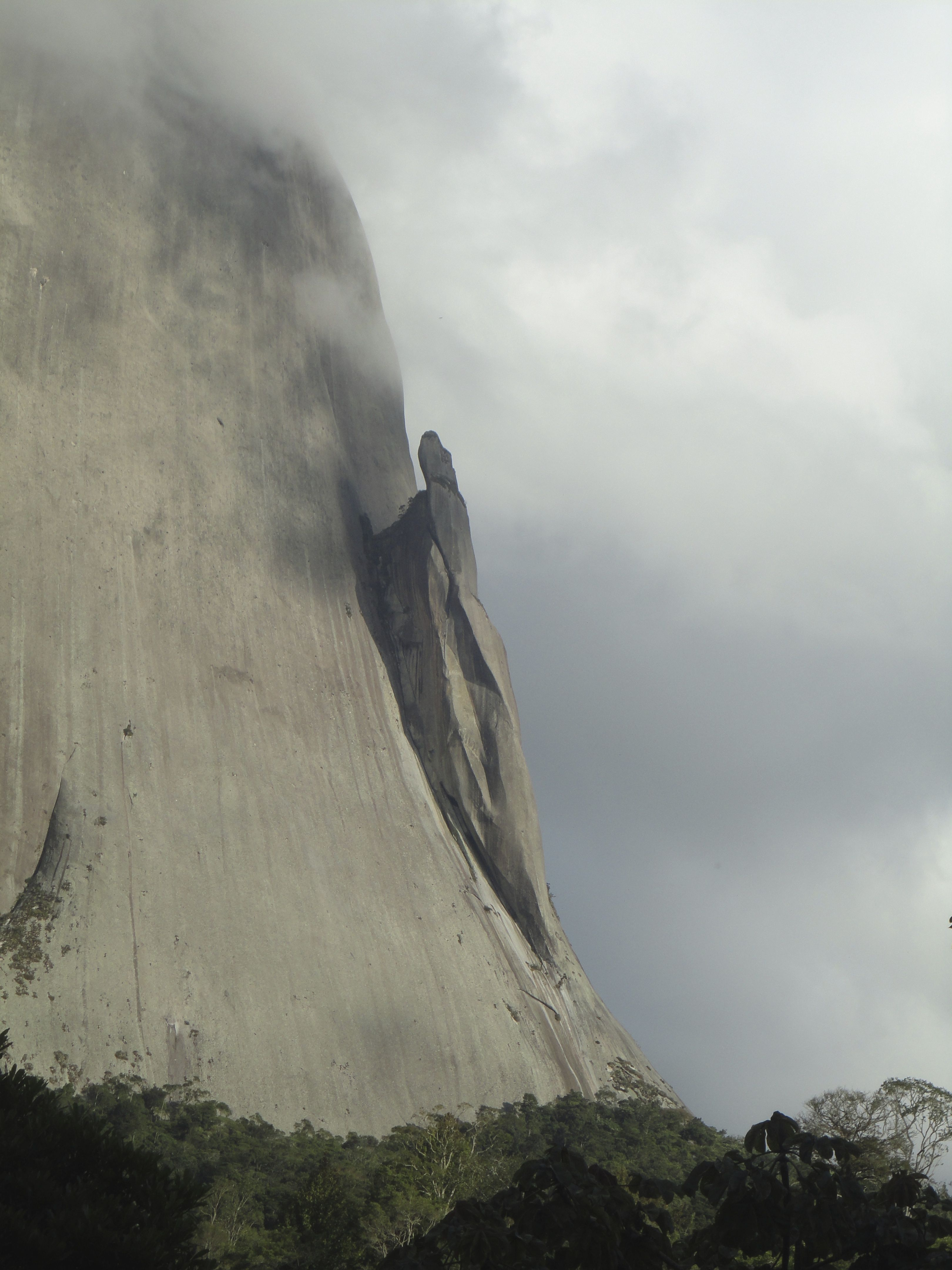
Lizard Rock attached to the Blue Rock

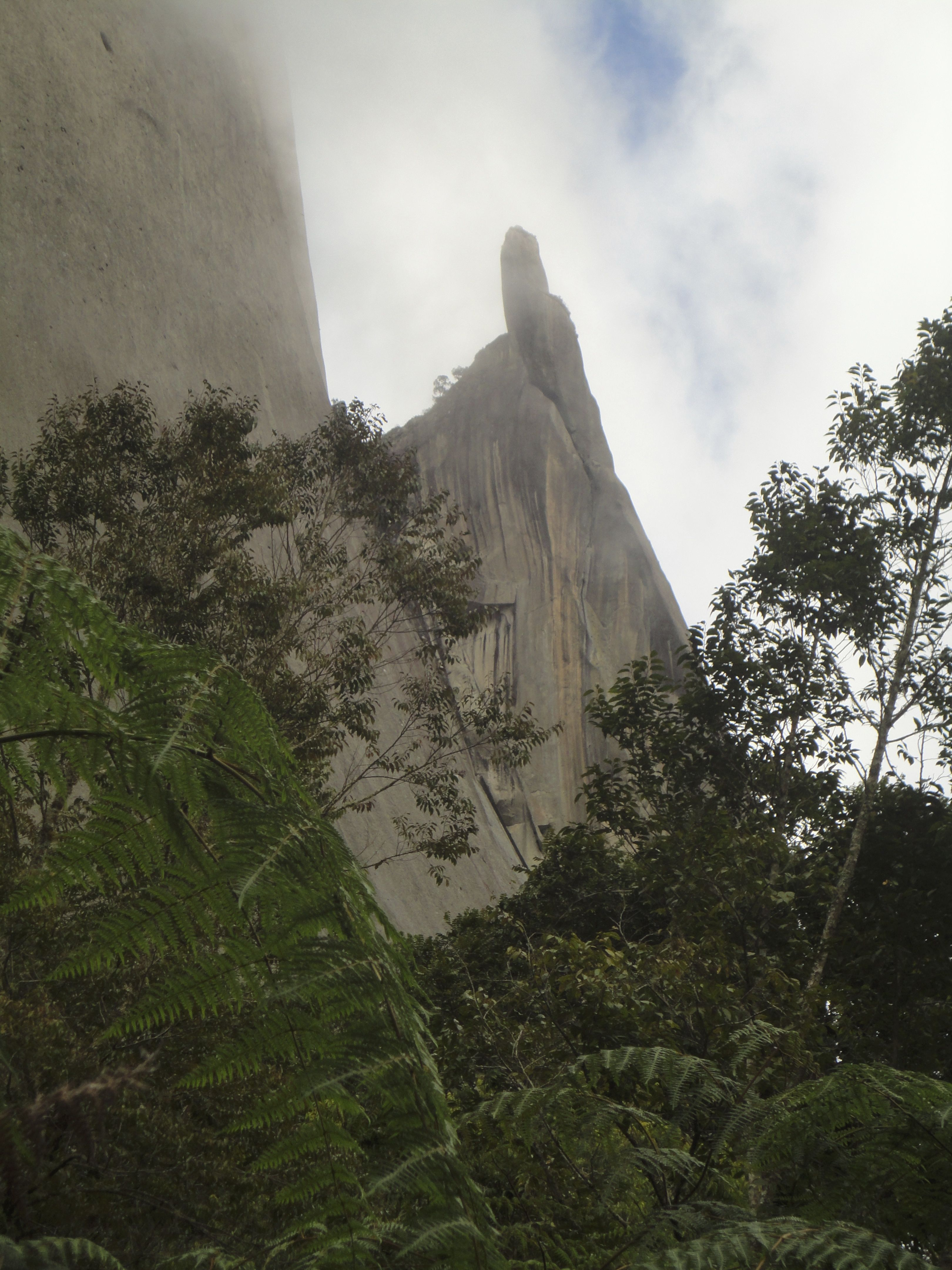
The lizard Rock attached to the Blue Rock

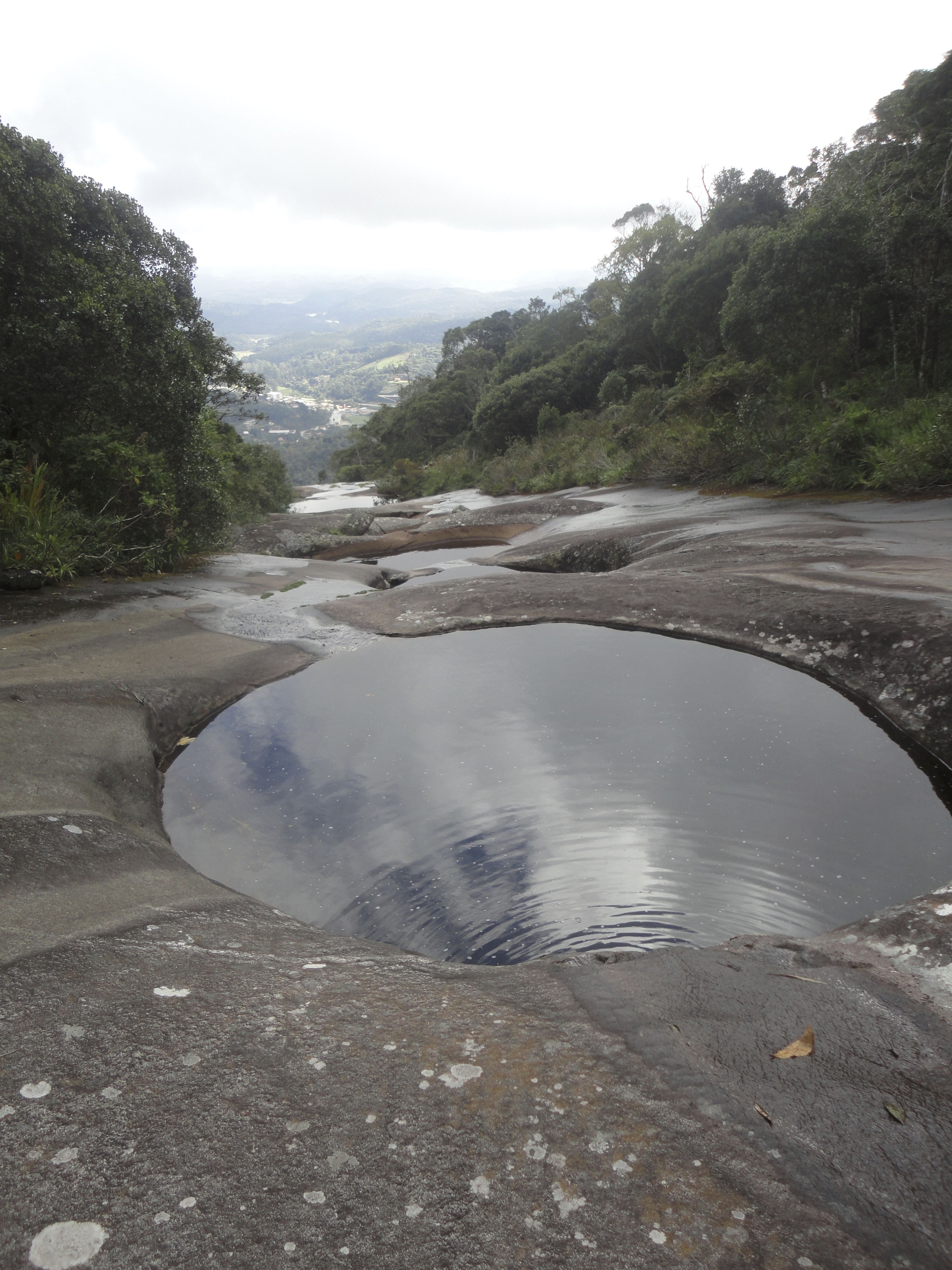
Natural Pool on Blue Rock

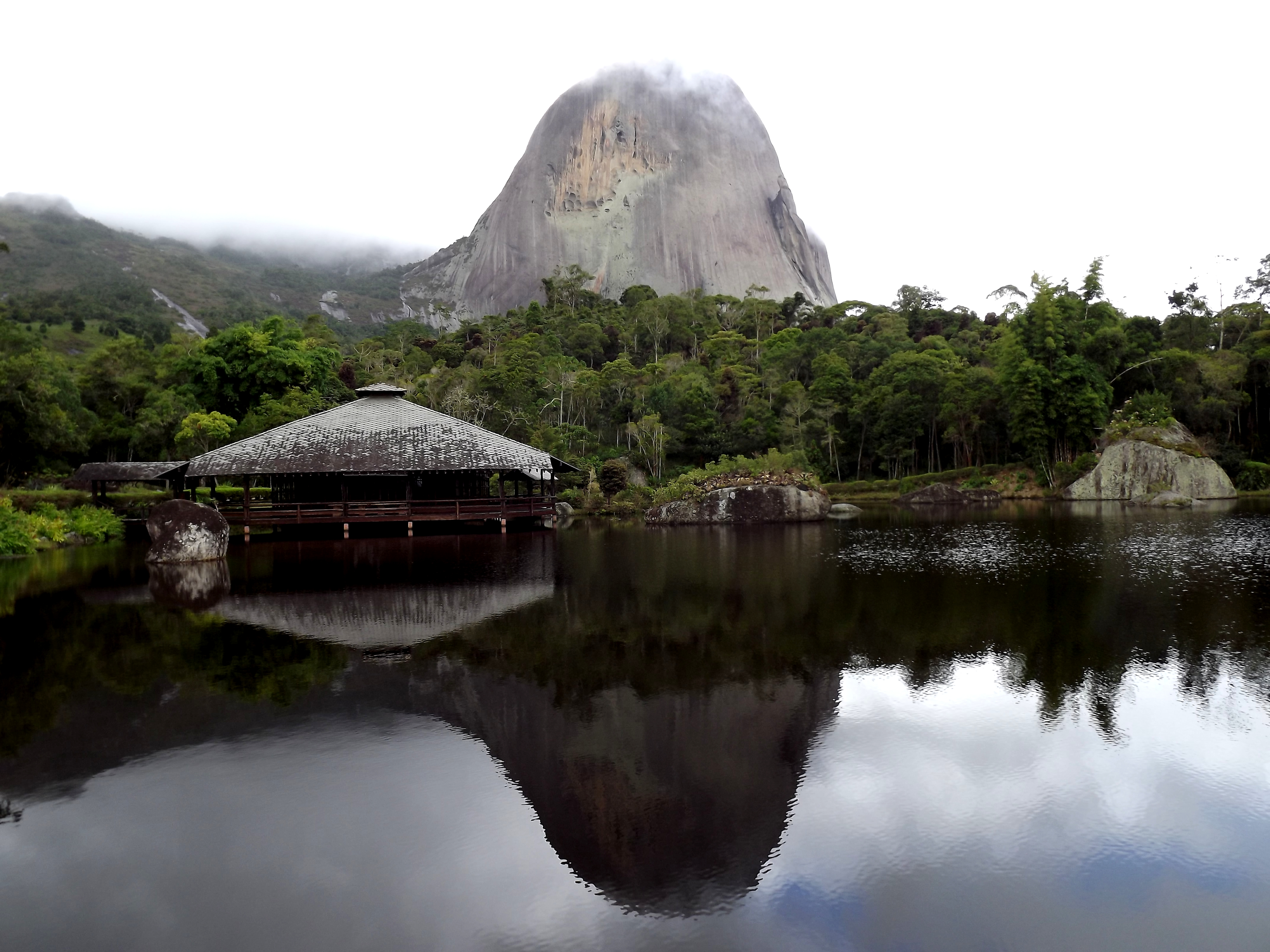
Pedra Azul as seen from the Dark Lake

== Sources ==
- Lamas, Ivana Reis; Crepaldi, Maria Otávia; Mesquita, Carlos Alberto Bernardo (2015), Uma Rede no Corredor (PDF) (in Portuguese), Conservação Internacional (CI-Brasil), ISBN 978-85-98830-28-5
- Parque Estadual de Pedra Azul (in Portuguese), Pedra Azul do Aracê
