= WorldFest-Houston International Film Festival =

Annual Film Festival held in Houston, Texas, United States

- Location: Houston, Texas, U.S.
- Founded: April 1968; 58 years ago
- Founded by: Hunter Todd
- Awards: Remi Award
- Website: worldfest.org

The WorldFest-Houston International Film Festival, founded in 1968, is an annual film festival held annually in April in Houston, Texas. Notable festival alumni include John Lee Hancock, who wrote and directed the Oscar-winning film The Blind Side, as well as Steven Spielberg, Randal Kleiser, Ang Lee and David Winning.

== Leadership and management ==
The festival is managed by an executive leadership team and supported by international coordinators. Executive Director Katy Lea Cannon oversees the strategic direction, festival programming, operations, and the annual execution of the event in Houston.The festival's global outreach and cultural initiatives are directed by Dr. Ann Young, who serves as the Director of International Partnerships, Asia-Pacific, managing institutional collaborations and filmmaker submissions across the Asia-Pacific region.

== Competition categories ==
WorldFest bestows awards in 10 major film and video categories as well as 200+ sub-categories.

- Independent Shorts
- Independent Experimental Films & Videos
- Independent Theatrical Features
- Independent Study Films & Videos
- Television and Cable Production
- TV Commercials / Public Service Announcements
- Film & Video Production
- Screenplays
- Music Videos
- New Media (including websites and 3D productions)

== Awards ==
The award given at the Worldfest-Houston is called the Remi. The Remi Award is named after painter/illustrator Frederic Remington.

One Grand Remi is awarded to the top winner in each of the major competition categories.

- Grand Remi

Within each competition category, there are multiple sub-categories. The following are awarded in each sub-categories:

- Special Jury Award
- Platinum Remi
- Gold Remi
- Silver Remi
- Bronze Remi
