= Samba =

Brazilian musical genre

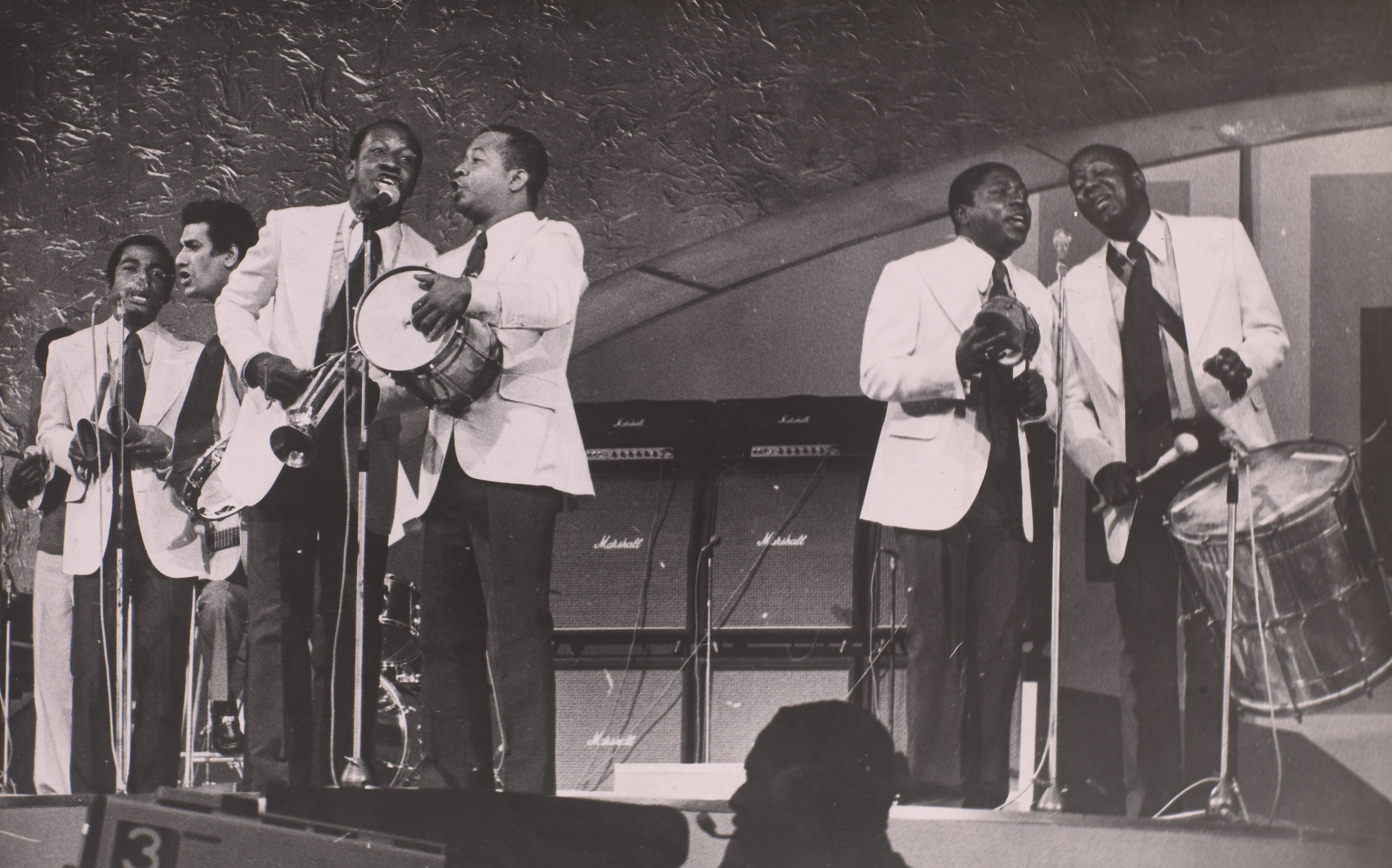
- Os Originais do Samba (1972)
- Stylistic origins: Afro-Brazilian batucada and rural traditional rhythms dances, especially samba de roda
- Cultural origins: Late 19th century in Bahia, and early 20th century, Rio de Janeiro and Salvador, Brazil

Subgenres
- Bossa nova; pagode; samba-canção; samba-choro; Samba funk; samba-jazz; Samba-joia; Samba junino; samba de breque; samba de enredo; samba-exaltação; samba de partido-alto; samba de terreiro; Samba duro; Samba-chulado; sambalanço; Samba-maxixe; Samba-sincopado, among others

Other topics
- Sambass; Samba-rap; Samba reggae; Samba rock; Brazilian Carnival; samba (Brazilian dance); samba schools

Samba (Portuguese pronunciation: [ˈsɐ̃bɐ]) is a broad term for many of the rhythms that compose the better known Brazilian music genres that originated in the Afro-Brazilian communities of Bahia in the late 19th century and early 20th century. It is a name or prefix used for several rhythmic variants, such as samba urbano carioca (urban Carioca samba), samba de roda (sometimes also called rural samba), among many other forms of samba, mostly originated in the Rio de Janeiro and Bahia states. Having its roots in West African musical traditions, especially those linked to the primitive rural samba of the colonial and imperial periods, it is considered one of the most important cultural phenomena in Brazil and one of the country symbols. Present in the Portuguese language at least since the 19th century, the word "samba" was originally used to designate a "popular dance". Over time, its meaning has been extended to a "batuque-like circle dance", a dance style, and also to a "music genre". This process of establishing itself as a musical genre began in the 1910s and it had its inaugural landmark in the song "Pelo Telefone", launched in 1917. Despite being identified by its creators, the public, and the Brazilian music industry as "samba", this pioneering style was much more connected from the rhythmic and instrumental point of view to maxixe than to samba itself.

Samba was modernly structured as a musical genre only in the late 1920s from the neighborhood of Estácio and soon extended to Oswaldo Cruz and other parts of Rio through its commuter rail. Today synonymous with the rhythm of samba, this new samba brought innovations in rhythm, melody and also in thematic aspects. Its rhythmic change based on a new percussive instrumental pattern resulted in a more drummed and syncopated style – as opposed to the inaugural "samba–maxixe" – notably characterized by a faster tempo, longer notes and a characterized cadence far beyond the simple ones used till then. Also the "Estácio paradigm" innovated in the formatting of samba as a song, with its musical organization in first and second parts in both melody and lyrics. In this way, the sambistas of Estácio created, structured and redefined the urban Carioca samba as a genre in a modern and finished way. In this process of establishment as an urban and modern musical expression, the Carioca samba had the decisive role of samba schools, responsible for defining and legitimizing definitively the aesthetic bases of rhythm, and radio broadcasting, which greatly contributed to the diffusion and popularization of the genre and its song singers. Thus, samba has achieved major projection throughout Brazil and has become one of the main symbols of Brazilian national identity. (Note: "Many groups and individuals (Black, Romani, Bahians, Cariocas, intellectuals, politicians, folklorists, classical composers, French, millionaires, poets – and even an American ambassador) participated, with greater or lesser tenacity, in the 'fixation' of samba as a musical genre and its nationalization".) (Note: "... the transformation of samba into national music was not a sudden event, going from repression to praise in less than a decade, but the crowning of a secular tradition of contacts ... between various social groups in attempt to invent Brazilian identity and popular culture.") Once criminalized and rejected for its Brazilian origins, and definitely working-class music in its mythic origins, the genre has also received support from members of the upper classes and the country's cultural elite.

At the same time that it established itself as the genesis of samba, the "Estácio paradigm" paved the way for its fragmentation into new sub-genres and styles of composition and interpretation throughout the 20th century. Mainly from the so-called "golden age" of Brazilian music, samba received abundant categorizations, some of which denote solid and well-accepted derivative strands, such as bossa nova, pagode, partido alto, samba de breque, samba-canção, samba de enredo and samba de terreiro, while other nomenclatures were somewhat more imprecise, such as samba do barulho (literally "noise samba"), samba epistolar ("epistolary samba") ou samba fonético ("phonetic samba") – and some merely derogatory – such as sambalada, sambolero or sambão joia.

The modern samba that emerged at the beginning of the 20th century is predominantly in a 2/4 time signature varied with the conscious use of a sung chorus to a batucada rhythm, with various stanzas of declaratory verses. Its traditional instrumentation is composed of percussion instruments such as the pandeiro, cuíca, tamborim, ganzá and surdo accompaniment – whose inspiration is choro – such as classical guitar and cavaquinho. In 2005 UNESCO declared Samba de Roda part of Intangible Cultural Heritage of Humanity, and in 2007, the Brazilian National Institute of Historic and Artistic Heritage declared Carioca samba and three of its matrices – samba de terreiro, partido-alto and samba de enredo – as cultural heritage in Brazil.

== Etymology and definition ==
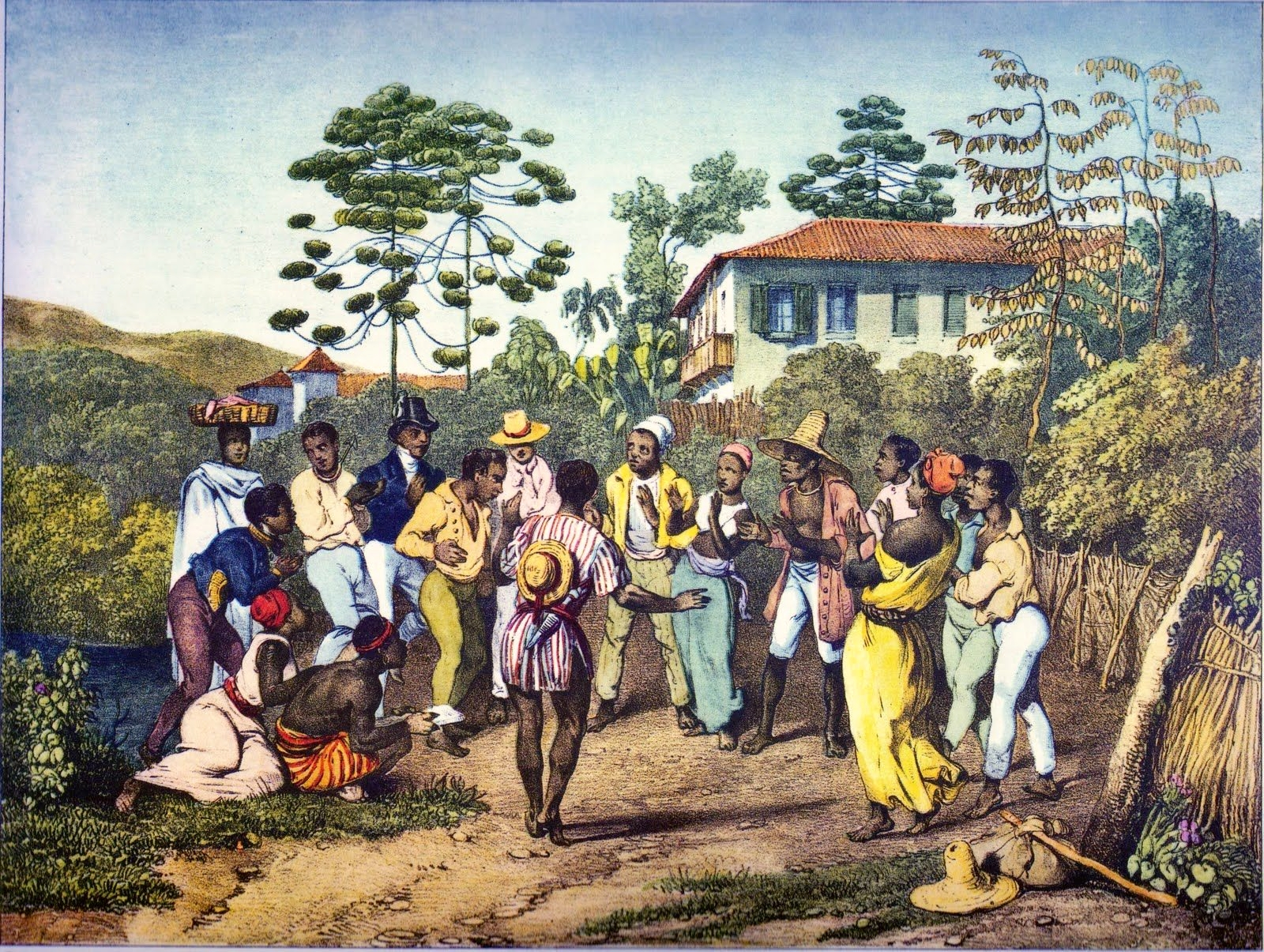
"Batuque" (1835), a painting by Johann Moritz Rugendas

There is no consensus among experts on the etymology of the term "samba". A traditionalist view that defends that the etymon comes from the Bantu was in the Diário de Pernambuco in 1830. The term was documented in the publication in a note opposing the sending of soldiers to the countryside of Pernambuco State as a disciplinary measure, as there they could be idle and entertained with "fishing of corrals [traps to catch fish], and climbing coconut trees, in whose hobbies viola and samba will be welcomed ". Another old appearance was recorded in the humorous Recife newspaper O Carapuceiro, dated February 1838, when Father Miguel Lopes Gama of Sacramento wrote against what he called "the samba d'almocreve" – not referring to the future musical genre, but a kind of merriment (dance drama) popular for black people of that time. According to Hiram Araújo da Costa, over the centuries, the festival of dances of enslaved people in Bahia were called samba. In Rio de Janeiro, the word only became known at the end of the 19th century, when it was linked to rural festivities, to the area of Black people and to the "north" of the country, that is, the Brazilian Northeast.

For many years of the Brazilian colonial and imperial history, the terms "batuque" or "samba" were used in any manifestation of African origins that brought together dances (mainly umbigada), songs and uses of Black people instruments. At the end of the 19th century, "samba" was present in the Portuguese language, designating different types of popular dances performed by African slaves (xiba, fandango, catereté, candomblé, baião) that assumed its own characteristics in each Brazilian state, not only by the diversity of the ethnic groups of the African diaspora, but also the peculiarity of each region in which they were settlers. In the twentieth century, the term was gaining new meanings, as for a "circle dance similar to batuque" and a "genre of popular song".

The use of the word in a musical context was documented as early as 1913 in the song Em casa de baiana, registered as a "samba de partido-alto"; then in the following year, for the works A viola está magoada and Moleque vagabundo; finally, in 1916, for the famous song Pelo Telefone, released as "samba carnavalesco" ("carnival samba") and regarded as the founding landmark of modern Carioca samba.

== Roots ==
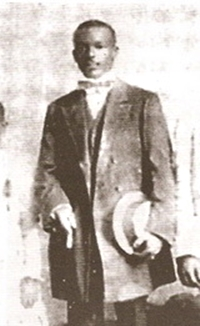
Hilário Jovino Ferreira founded the first carnival rancho in Rio.

=== Roots of tradition ===
During a folkloric research mission in the Northeast Region of 1938, the writer Mário de Andrade noticed that, in rural areas, the term "samba" was associated with the event where the dance was performed, the way of dancing the samba and the music performed for the dance. Urban Carioca samba was influenced by several traditions associated with the universe of rural communities throughout Brazil. The folklorist Oneida Alvarenga was the first expert to list primitive popular dances of the type: coco, tambor de crioula, lundu, chula or fandango, baiano, cateretê, quimbere, mbeque, caxambu and xiba. To this list, Jorge Sabino and Raul Lody added samba de coco, sambada (also called coco de roda), samba de matuto, samba de caboclo, and jongo.

One of the most important forms of dance in the constitution of Carioca samba choreography, the samba de roda, 'circle samba', practiced in Bahia's Recôncavo, was typically danced outdoors by a soloist, while other participants of the circle would take charge of the singing – alternating between solo and chorus parts – and of accompanying instrumental performance. The three basic dance-steps of Bahian circle samba were named corta-a-jaca, separa-o-visgo, and apanha-o-bago (literally and respectively, "cut-the-jackfruit", "separate-the-birdlime", and "pick-the-grape"), in addition to one intended to be danced by women only. In their research on Bahian samba, Roberto Mendes and Waldomiro Junior examined that some elements from other cultures, such as the Arab pandeiro and the Portuguese viola, were gradually incorporated into the singing and rhythm of African batuques, whose best-known variants were samba corrido and samba chulado.

In the São Paulo state, another primitive modality of known rural samba developed, practiced basically in cities along the Tietê River – from São Paulo city to the river's middle course – and traditionally divided into samba de bumbo, characterized by instrumental percussion with a bass drum, and batuque de umbigada, with tambu, quinjengue and guaiá for the instrumentation.

Essentially made up of two parts (choir and solo) usually performed on the fly, the partido alto was – and still is – the most traditional sung variant of rural samba in the state of Rio de Janeiro. Originating in Greater Rio de Janeiro, it is the combination, according to Lopes and Simas, of Bahian circle-samba, calango singing, and a kind of transition from rural samba to what would come to be urban 20th century Rio samba.

=== Criminalization ===
In its beginnings, samba was heavily criminalized by the Brazilian government. Born in the favelas, it was a distinctly Afro Brazilian musical genre that brought people together in community and celebration, which was not well-seen or -received by the Brazilian elite, who deemed it tasteless, immoral and inferior. Such attitude was grounded in racism and classism, besides religious intolerance: samba's incorporation of African drumming was commonly associated with Afro Brazilian religions, which have long been demonized and discriminated against in Brazil, especially so in the early 20th century, when samba was gaining traction.

Many early composers were thought to be leaders of cults of African origin, therefore samba faced policed persecution. Any samba gathering would be swiftly shut down, with musicians arrested and their instruments destroyed. As a result, samba had to go underground, relying on community members to assume the risk of persecution to have samba parties out of their homes. Ultimately, the genre became a hallmark of Brazilian culture and a highlight of Carnival, but it was not ever thus, as in its origins practicing samba was defiance against the government.

=== Roots of the Carioca Carnival ===
During colonial Brazil, many public Catholic events used to attract all social segments, including Black and enslaved people, who took the celebrations as opportunities to express themselves authentically, in their original, native way, with such cultural manifestations as the crowning revelry of the Congo Kings, and the Bantu revelry (called cucumbi) in Rio de Janeiro. Gradually were those once exclusively Black celebrations being disconnected from the Catholic roots and rites of Carnival, eventually morphing into the Brazilian Carnival. From the cucumbis emerged the samba school called cordões cariocas (lit. 'Carioca strings'), which celebrated Brazilianness, or the mixed heritage of the Brazilian people, e.g. by presenting Black people in indigenous dress. At the end of the 19th century, on the initiative of composer and samba pioneer Hilário Jovino, the samba ranch ranchos de reis, 'ranches of kings' (later known as ranchos de carnaval, 'Carnival ranches'), was created in the state of Pernambuco. One of the most important ranches in Rio's Carnival was Ameno Resedá. Created in 1907, the self-titled racho-escola ("ranch-school") became a model for Carnival performances-in-procession and for future samba schools to be founded in the hills and outskirts of Rio de Janeiro.

== The urban Carioca samba ==
"Pelo Telefone"
Considered the landmark of samba as a musical genre

"Primeira Linha"
Composed by Heitor dos Prazeres, recording by Benedito Lacerda with accompaniment by Gente do Morro in 1930

"Samba de fato"
Composed by Pixinguinha and Cícero de Almeida, recorded by Patrício Teixeira and Trio T.B.T in 1932

=== Beginnings in a Bahian terreiro ===
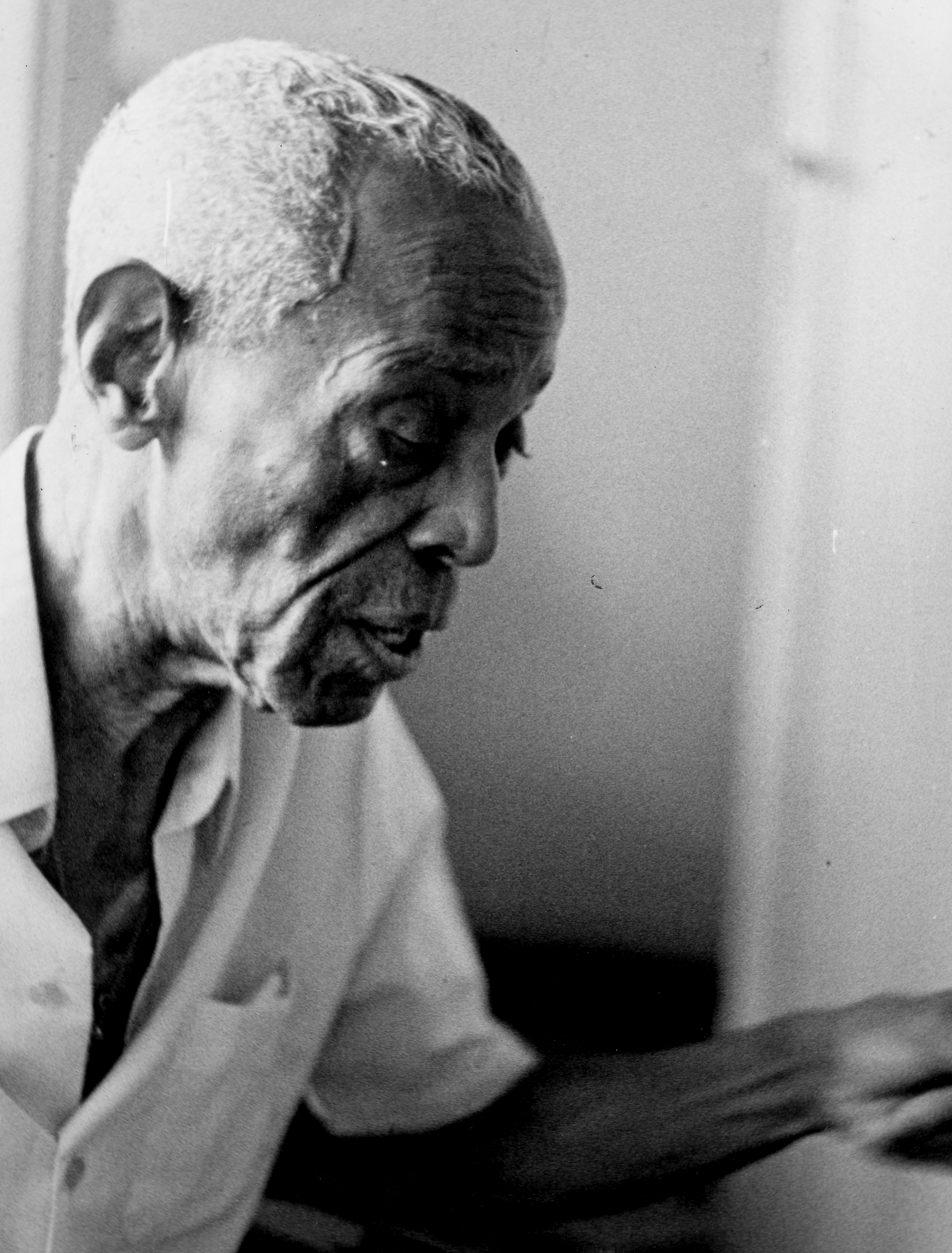
Donga recorded "Pelo Telefone", considered the founding landmark of samba.

A political and sociocultural epicenter of Brazil, based on slavery, Rio de Janeiro was strongly influenced by African culture. In the middle of the 19th century, more than half the population of the city – then capital of the Brazilian Empire – was formed by black slaves. In the early 1890s, Rio had more than half a million inhabitants, of whom only half were born in the city, while the other part came from the old Brazilian imperial provinces, mainly from Bahia. In search of better living conditions, this influx of black Bahians to Rio lands increased considerably after the abolition of slavery in Brazil. Called "Pequena Africa" ("Little Africa") by Heitor dos Prazeres, this Afro-Bahian diaspora community in the country's capital settled in the vicinity of the Rio de Janeiro port area and, after the urban reforms of Mayor Pereira Passos, in the neighborhoods of Saúde and Cidade Nova. Through the action of black Bahians living in Rio, new habits, customs and values of Afro-Bahian matrixes were introduced that influenced the culture of Rio, especially in popular events such as the traditional Festa da Penha and Carnival. Black women from Salvador and Bahia's Recôncavo, the "Tias Baianas" (literally, "Bahian Aunts") founded the first Candomblé terreiros, introduced the cowrie-shell divination and disseminated the mysteries of the African-based religions of the Jeje-Nagô tradition in the city. In addition to candomblé, the residences or terreiros of the aunts of Bahia hosted various community activities, such as cooking and the pagodes, where urban Rio samba would develop.

Among the most well-known Bahian aunts in Rio, were the Tias Sadata, Bibiana, Fê, Rosa Olé, Amélia do Aragão, Veridiana, Mônica, Perciliana de Santo Amaro and Ciata. A place for meetings around religion, cuisine, dance and music, Tia Ciata's home was frequented both by samba musicians and pais-de-santo as well as by influential intellectuals and politicians from Rio de Janeiro society. (Note: Despite the strong racial segregation, there was permanent cultural contact between the Bahian community and the local elites of the period.) Among some of its members regulars were Sinhô, Pixinguinha, Heitor dos Prazeres, João da Baiana, Donga and Caninha, as well as some journalists and intellectuals, such as João do Rio, Manuel Bandeira, Mário de Andrade and Francisco Guimarães (popularly known as Vagalume). It was in this environment that Vagalume, then a columnist for Jornal do Brazil, witnessed the birth of "O Macaco É Outro" in October 1916. According to the journalist, this samba immediately won the support of the popular people who left singing the music in an animated block. Donga registered the work in sheet music and, on 27 November of that year, declared himself as its author in the National Library, where it was registered as "carnival samba" called "Pelo Telefone". Shortly after, the score was used in three recordings at Casa Edison record label. One of them interpreted by Baiano with the accompaniment of classical guitar, cavaquinho and clarinet. Released in 78 rpm format on 19 January 1917, "Pelo Telefone" became a huge hit in that year's Rio carnival. Two instrumental versions were also released – recorded by Banda Odeon and Banda de 1º Battalion of the Police of Bahia – in 1917 and 1918 respectively.

The success of "Pelo Telefone" marked the official beginning of samba as a song genre. Its primacy as "the first samba in history" has, however, been questioned by some scholars, on the grounds that the work was only the first samba under this categorization to be successful. Before, "Em casa da baiana" was recorded by Alfredo Carlos Bricio, declared to the National Library as "samba de partido-alto" in 1913, "A viola está magoada", by Catulo da Paixão Cearense, released as "samba" by Baiano and Júlia the following year, and "Moleque vagabundo", "samba" by Lourival de Carvalho, also in 1914.

Another debate related to "Pelo Telefone" concerns Donga's exclusive authorship, which was soon contested by some of his contemporaries who accused him of appropriating a collective, anonymous creation, registering it as his own. The central part of the song would have been conceived in the traditional improvisations in meetings at Tia Ciata's house. Sinhô claimed the authorship of the chorus "ai, se rolinha, sinhô, sinhô" and created another song lyrics in response to Donga. However, Sinhô himself, who would consolidate himself in the 1920s as the first important figure of samba, was accused of appropriating other people's songs or verses – to which he justified himself with the famous maxim that samba was "like a bird" in the air, it is "whoever gets it first". This defense is part of a period in which the figure of the popular composer was not that of the individual who composed or organized sounds, but the one who registered and disseminated the songs. In the era of mechanical recordings, musical compositions – under the pretext of ensuring that there was no plagiarism – did not belong to composers, but to publishers (Note: During the 19th century, a large part of the compositions belonged to the sheet music publishers, who bought, edited and disseminated them by hiring pianists – Sinhô himself worked for a long time as a pianist in music and piano shops.) and, later, to record labels, a reality modified only with the advent of electrical recordings, when the right to intellectual property of the work became individual and inalienable to the composer. In any case, it was because "Pelo Telefone" that samba gained notoriety as a product in the Brazilian music industry. Gradually, the nascent urban samba was gaining popularity in Rio de Janeiro, especially at the Festa da Penha and Carnival. In October, the Festa da Penha became a great event for composers from Cidade Nova who wanted to publicize their compositions in the expectation that they would be released at the following carnival. Another promoter during this period was the Revue shows, a place that enshrined Aracy Cortes as one of the first successful singers of the new popular song genre.

The solidification of the electric recording system made it possible for the recording industry to launch new sambas by singers with less powerful voices, (Note: At the time of the mechanical recordings, the singers needed to be equipped with an almost operatic timbre to have their voice captured by the studios.) such as Carmen Miranda and Mário Reis, performers who became references when creating a new way of interpreting the most natural and spontaneous samba, without so many ornaments, as opposed to the tradition of belcanto style. These recordings followed an aesthetic pattern characterized by structural similarities to the lundu and, mainly, to the maxixe. Because of this, this type of samba is considered by scholars as "samba-maxixe" or "samba amaxixado". Although the samba practiced in the festivities of Bahian communities in Rio was an urban stylization of the ancestral "samba de roda" in Bahia, characterized by a high party samba with refrains sung to the marked rhythm of the palms and the plates shaved with knives, this samba it was also influenced by the maxixe. It was in the following decade that a new model of samba would be born, from the hills of Rio de Janeiro, quite distinct from that of the amaxixado style associated with the communities of Cidade Nova.

=== Samba do Estácio, the genesis of urban samba ===
"Na Pavuna"
Composed by Homero Dornelas, recorded by Bando de Tangarás; hit in the Rio carnival of 1930

"O que será de mim"
Composed by Ismael Silva, Nilson Bastos and Francisco Alves; recorded by Francisco Alves and Mário Reis in 1931

"Agora é Cinza"
Composed by Bide and Marçal, recorded by Mario Reis in 1933

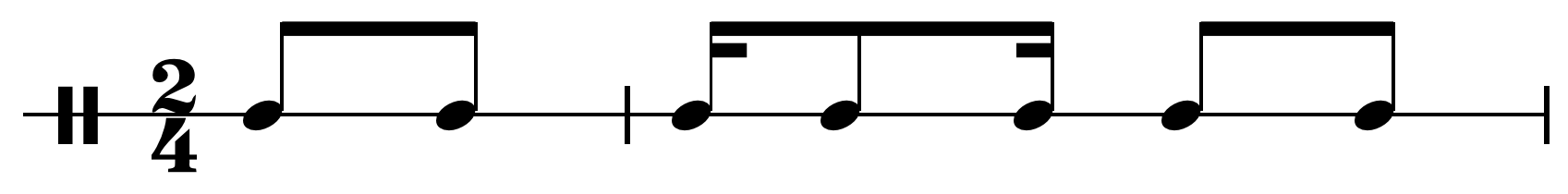
Samba rhythm

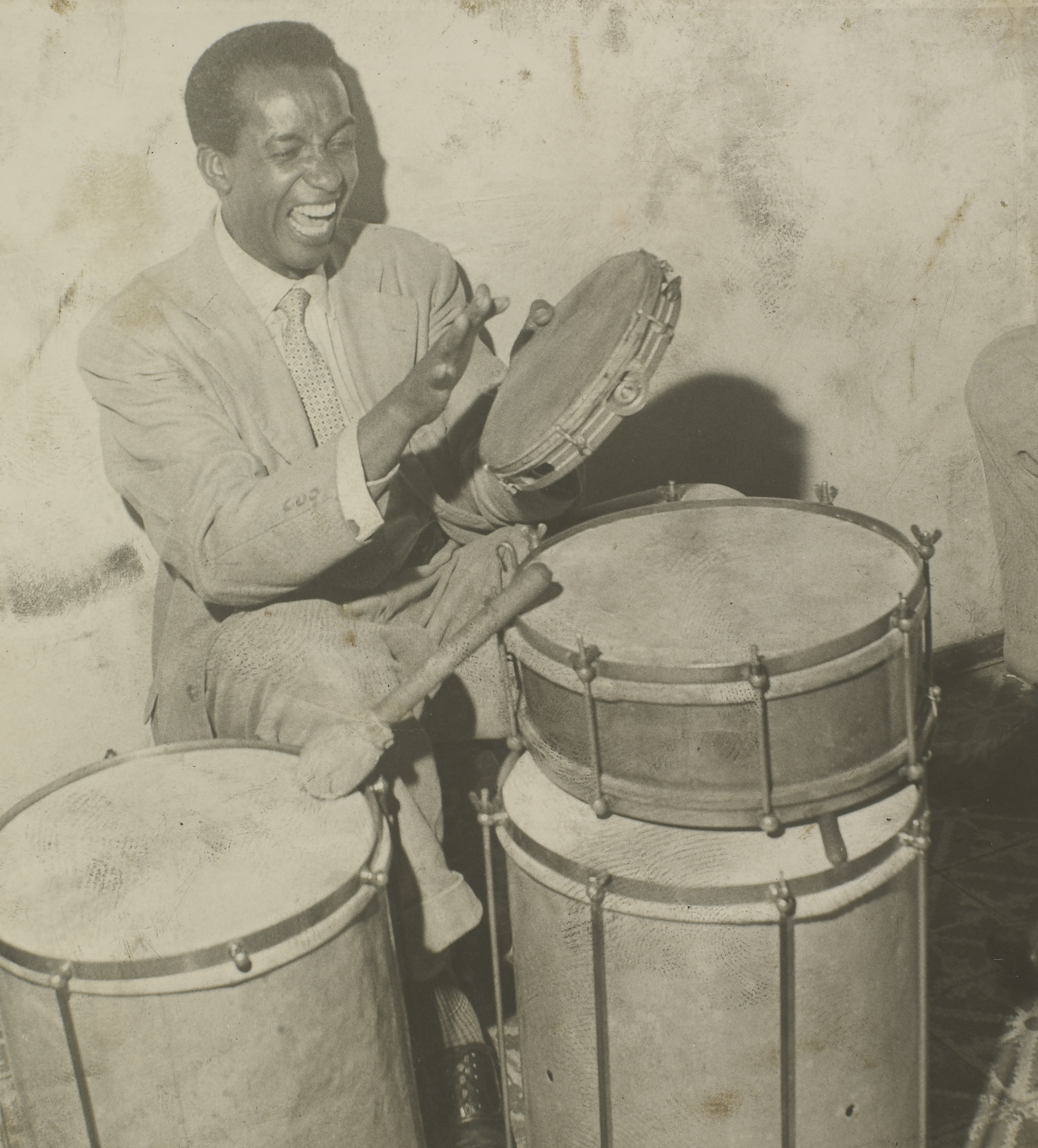
The sambista Ismael Silva was one of the great composers of Estácio's samba that emerged in the 1920s.

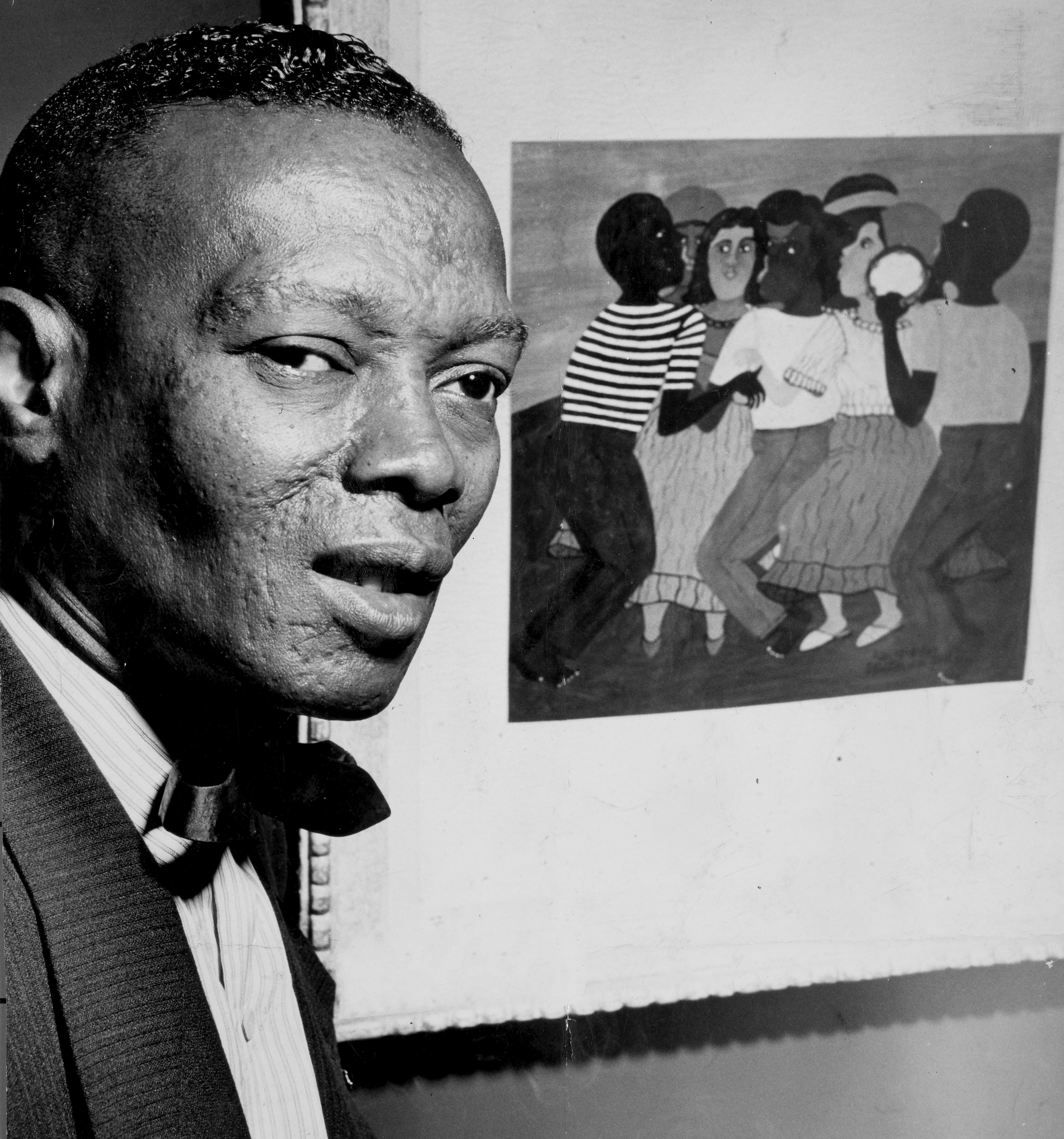
The sambista Heitor dos Prazeres participated in the foundation of the first Brazilian samba schools.

Between the end of the 19th century and the beginning of the 20th century, in the context of the First Brazilian Republic, the poor strata of Rio de Janeiro faced serious economic issues related to their survival in the federal capital, such as the imposition of new taxes resulting from the provision of public services (such as electric lighting, water and sewage, modern pavements), new legislation that imposed architectural norms and restrictions for urban buildings, and the prohibition on the exercise of certain professions or economic practices linked to subsistence, especially of the poorest. The situation of this population worsened further with the urban reforms in the center of Rio, whose widening or opening of roads required the destruction of several tenements and popular housing in the region.

As a result, these homeless residents were temporarily occupying slopes in the vicinity of these old demolished buildings, such as Morro da Providência (mainly occupied by former residents of the Cabeça de Porco tenement and former soldiers of the War of Canudos) and Morro de Santo Antonio (especially by ex-combatants of the Brazilian Naval Revolts). In a short time, this type of temporary housing was permanently established in the urban landscape of Rio, originating the first favelas in the city. From the increase in the populations expelled from the tenements and the arrival of new poor migrants to the capital of the Republic, the favelas grew rapidly and spread through the hills settlements and suburban areas of Rio.

It was in this scenario that a new type of samba would be born during the second half of the 1920s, called "samba do Estácio", which would constitute the genesis of urban Carioca samba by creating a new pattern so revolutionary that its innovations last until the days current. Located close to Praça Onze and housing Morro do São Carlos, the neighborhood of Estácio was a center of convergence of public transport, mainly of trams that served the North Zone of the city. Its proximity to the nascent hills settlements as well as its primacy in the formation of this new samba ended up linking its musical production, from urban train lines, to the favelas and suburbs of Rio, such as Morro da Mangueira, and the suburban neighborhood of Osvaldo Cruz.

Estácio's samba was distinguished from Cidade Nova's samba both in thematic aspects, as well as in the melody and rhythm. Made for the parades of the carnival blocs in the neighborhood, the samba do Estácio innovated with a faster tempo, longer notes and a cadence beyond the traditional palms. Another structural change resulting from this samba was the valorization of the "second part" of the compositions: instead of using the typical improvisation of the samba circles of the alto party or carnival parades, there was the consolidation of pre-established sequences, which would have a theme – for example, everyday problems – and the possibility of fitting everything within the standards of the phonograph recordings of 78 rpm at the time – something like three minutes on 10-inch discs. In comparison to the works of the first generation of Donga, Sinhô and company, the sambas produced by the Estácio group also stood out for a greater countermetricity, which can be evidenced in a testimony by Ismael Silva about the innovations introduced by him and his companions in the new urban samba in Rio:

At that time, samba did not work for carnival groups to walk on the street as we see today. I started noticing that there was this thing. The samba was like this: tan tantan tan tantan. It was not possible. How would a bloc get out on the street like that? Then, we started making a samba like this: bum bum paticumbum pugurumdum.

— Ismael Silva

The intuitive onomatopoeia built by Ismael Silva tried to explain the rhythmic change operated by the sambistas of Estácio with the bum bum paticumbum pugurumdum of the surdo in marking the cadence of the samba, making it a more syncopated rhythm. It was, therefore, a break with the samba tan tantan tan tantan irradiated from the Bahian aunts meetings.

Thus, at the end of the 1920s, the modern carioca samba had two distinct models: the primitive urban samba of Cidade Nova and the new syncopated samba of the Estácio group. However, while the Bahian community enjoyed a certain social legitimacy, including the protection of important personalities of Rio society who supported and frequented the musical circles of the "Pequena Africa", the new Estaciano sambistas suffered socio-cultural discrimination, including through police repression. A popular neighborhood with a large Black/mixed contingent, Estácio was one of the great strongholds of poor samba musicians situated between marginality and social integration, who ended up being stigmatized by the upper classes in Rio as "dangerous" rascals. Because of this infamous brand, the Estaciano samba suffered great social prejudice in its origin.

To avoid police harassment and gain social legitimacy, Estácio's samba musicians decided to link their batucadas to carnival samba and organized themselves in what they christened as samba schools.

At the end of the carnival, samba has continued because we did samba all year. At Café Apolo, Café do Compadre, across the street, at the backyard feijoadas or at dawn, on street corners and in bars. Then the police used to come and bother us. But it didn't bother the guys of (carnival rancho) Amor, which had a headquarter and license to parade at the carnival. We decided to organize a carnival bloc, even without a license, that could allow us to go out at the carnival and do samba all year round. Organization and respect, without fights or huffing, were important. It was called "Deixa Falar" as it despises the middle class ladies of the neighborhood who used to call people a vagabond. We were malandros, in a good way, but vagabonds weren't.

— Bide

According to Ismael Silva – also a founder of Deixa Falar and the creator of the expression "samba school" – the term was inspired by the Normal school that once existed in Estácio, and therefore the samba schools would form "samba teachers". Although the primacy of the country's first samba school is contested by Portela and Mangueira, Deixa Falar was a pioneer in spreading the term in its quest to establish a different organization from the carnival blocks of that time and also the first carnival association to use the group in the future known as bateria, a unit made up of percussion instruments such as the surdo, tamborims and cuícas, which – when joining the already used pandeiros and shakers – gave a more "marching" characteristic to the samba of the parades.

In 1929, the sambista and babalawo Zé Espinguela organized the first contest among the first samba schools in Rio: Deixa Falar, Mangueira and Oswaldo Cruz (later Portela). The dispute did not involve parede, but a competition to choose the best samba theme among these carnival groups – whose winner is the samba "A Tristeza Me Persegue", by Heitor dos Prazeres, one of Oswaldo Cruz's representatives. Deixa Falar was disqualified for the use of a flute and tie by Benedito Lacerda, then representative of the Estácio group. This veto on wind instruments became the rule from then on – including for the first parade between them, organized in 1932 by journalist Mario Filho and sponsored by the daily Mundo Sportivo -, because it differentiated schools from carnival ranchos with the appreciation of batucadas, which would definitely mark the aesthetic bases of samba from then on.

Estácio's batucado and syncopated samba represented an aesthetic break with Cidade Nova's maxixe-style samba. In turn, the first generation of samba did not accept the innovations created by the samba musicians of the hill, seen as a misrepresentation of the genre or even designated as "march". (Note: In an interview recorded by journalist Sérgio Cabral in the late 1960s, Donga and Ismael Silva disagreed about what would be samba. Donga: "Samba is that for a long time. 'The police chief / on the phone sent me to warn / That in Carioca / There is a roulette wheel to play'." Ismael: "This is maxixe." Donga: "So, what is samba?" Ismael: "If you swear / That you love me / I can regenerate / But if it is / to pretend to be a woman / The orgy like that I won't let." Donga: "This is not samba, it is a marcha.") For musicians such as Donga and Sinhô, samba was synonymous with maxixe – a kind of the last Brazilian stage of European polka. For the samba musicians from the hills of Rio, samba was the last Brazilian stage of Angolan drumming that they proposed to teach to Brazilian society through samba schools. This generational conflict, however, did not last for long, and Estácio's samba established itself as the rhythm par excellence of Rio's urban samba during the 1930s.

Between 1931 and 1940 samba was the most recorded genre music in Brazil, with almost 1/3 of the total repertoire – 2,176 sambas songs in a universe of 6,706 compositions. Sambas and marchinhas together made up the percentages just over half of the repertoire recorded in that period. Thanks to the new electric recording technology, it was possible to capture the percussive instruments present in samba schools. The samba "Na Pavuna", performed by Bando de Tangarás, was the first recorded in studio with the percussion that would characterize the genre from there: tamborim, surdo, pandeiro, ganzá, cuíca, among others. Although there was the presence of these percussive instruments, the samba recordings in the studio were characterized by the predominance of musical arrangements of orchestrated tone with brass and string instruments. This orchestral pattern was mainly printed by Jewish arrangers, among them Simon Bountman, Romeu Ghipsmanm, Isaac Kolman and Arnold Gluckman, conductors whose erudite formation ended up giving a European symphonic sound in the counter-metric rhythm and batucada of the samba from Estacio.

Another reason for the success of the new samba in the music industry was the introduction of the "second part", which stimulated the establishment of partnerships between the composers. For example, one composer created the chorus of a samba and another composer conceived the second part, as occurred in the partnership between Ismael Silva and Noel Rosa in "Para Me Livrar do Mal". With the growing demand for new sambas by the singers, the practice of buying and selling compositions has also become common. This transaction usually took place in two different ways: the author negotiated only the sale of the samba recording – that is, he remained as the author of the composition, but he would not receive any part of the gains obtained from the sales of the records, which were divided between the buyer and the record label (Note: If the samba musician were part of a copyright regulatory agency, he would also be able to receive through this means.) – or the entire composition – that is, the real author completely lost the rights to his samba, including authorship. In some cases, the sambista sold the partnership to the buyer and also received a portion of the profits from the sales of the records. Selling a samba meant the composer had a chance to see his production publicized – especially when he did not yet enjoy the same prestige acquired by the first generation samba composers – and also a way to make up for his own financial difficulties. (Note: In a testimony to Muniz Sodré, Ismael Silva reports on her partnerships with Francisco Alves: "One day, in a hospital, I was approached by Alcebíades Barcelos (Bide). He asked me if he wanted to sell samba to Chico Viola [Francisco Alves]. A hundred thousand reis was what he offered. I accepted quickly and the samba, which became his property, appeared with my name. Then I sold 'Amor de Malandro', for five hundred réis, but this time I didn't appear in the recording as an author. I was angry, of course. The same was true of other samba dancers: they sold songs that appeared as if they were from buyers.") For the buyer, it was the possibility to renew his repertoire, record more records and earn sales, and further consolidate his artistic career. Artists with good contact with record labels, the popular singers Francisco Alves and Mário Reis were adepts of this practicea, having acquired sambas from composers such as Cartola and Ismael Silva.

=== Radio era and popularization of samba ===
"Uva de caminhão"
Composed by Assis Valente, recorded by Carmen Miranda in 1939

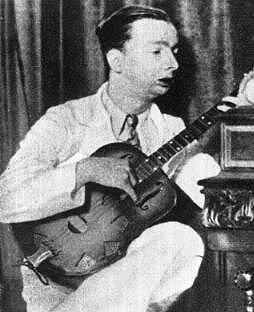
The sambista Noel Rosa was the first major figure in samba to bring the genre closer to the Brazilian middle class.

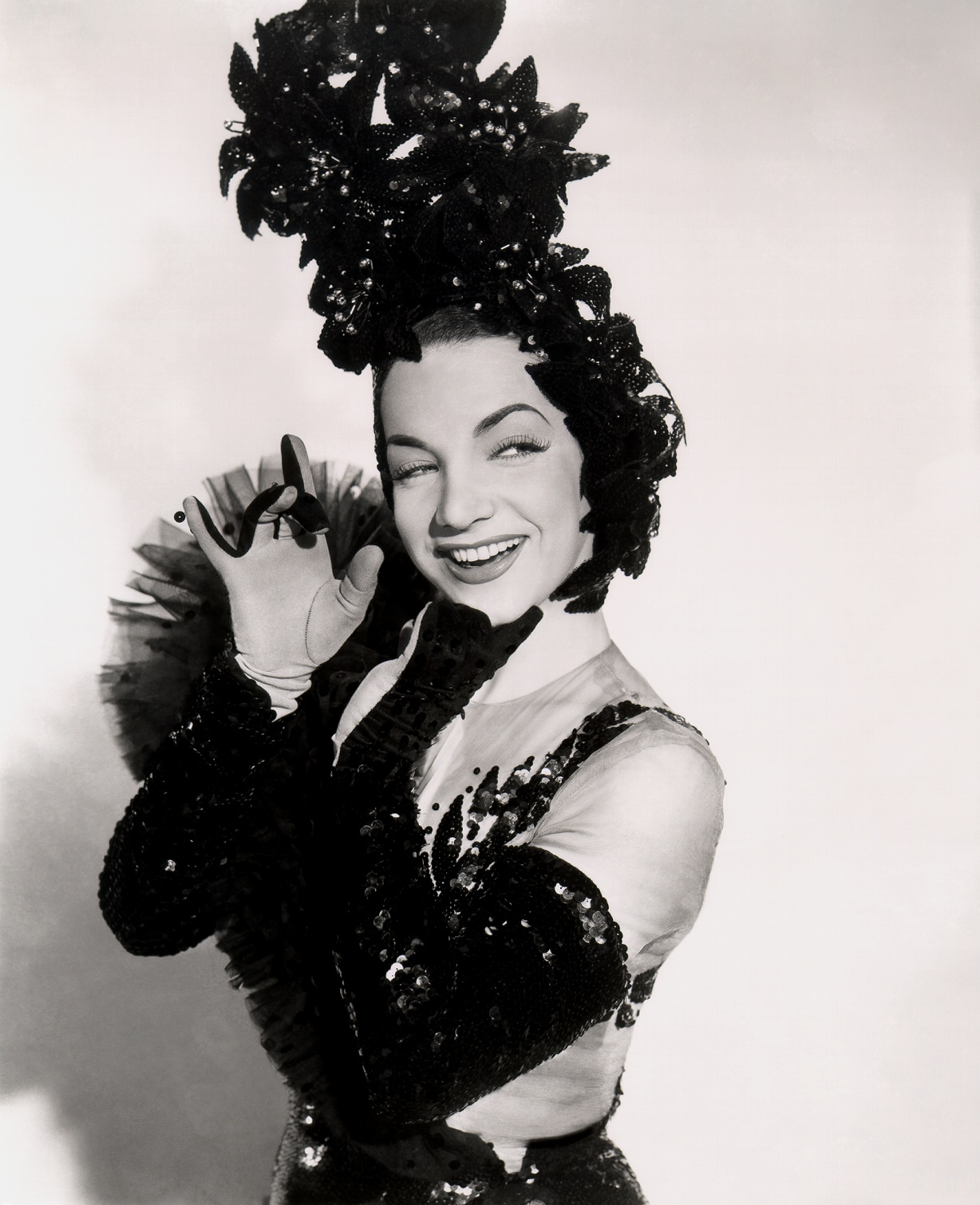
Carmen Miranda was the first samba singer to promote the genre internationally.

The 1930s in Brazilian music marked the rise of Estácio's samba as a musical genre to the detriment of maxixe-style samba. If the samba schools were crucial to delimit, publicize and legitimize the new Estaciano samba as the authentic expression of the Rio's urban samba, the radio also played a decisive role in popularizing it nationwide.

Although broadcasting in Brazil was officially inaugurated in 1922, it was still an incipient and technical, experimental and restricted telecommunication medium. In the 1920s, Rio de Janeiro was home to only two short-range radio stations whose programming was basically limited to broadcast educational content or classical music. This panorama changed radically in the 1930s, with the political rise of Getúlio Vargas, who identified the media as a tool of public interest for economic, educational, cultural or political purposes, as well as for the national integration of the country.

A 1932 Vargas decree regulating radio advertising was crucial to the commercial, professional and popular transformation of Brazilian broadcasting. With the authorization that ads could occupy 20% (and then 25%) of the programming, the radio became more attractive and safe for advertisers and – added to the increase in sales of radio sets in the period – transformed this telecommunication medium of its function once educational for an entertainment powerhouse. With the contribution of financial resources from advertising, the broadcasters began to invest in musical programming, turning the radio into the great popularizer of popular music in the Brazil – whether phonograph record or live recordings directly from the stations' auditoriums and studios. With samba as a great attraction, the radio gave space to the genre with the "sambas de carnaval", released for the carnival celebrations, and the "sambas de meio de ano" ("mid-year sambas"), launched throughout the year.

This expansion of radio as a medium of mass communication enabled the formation of professional technicians linked to sound activities, as well as for singers, arrangers and composers. From this scenario, broadcasters Ademar Casé (in Rio) and César Ladeira (Note: "Committed to valuing her artists, Ladeira innovated in presenting them by epithets or catchphrases: 'Remarkable Little Girl' designated to Carmem Miranda; 'The singer of the thousand and one fans' designated to Ciro Monteiro; and 'the singer who dispensed with adjectives' designated to Carlos Galhardo.") (in São Paulo) stood out as pioneers in the establishment of exclusive contracts with singers for presentation in live programs. That is, instead of receiving only one fee per presentation, the monthly remuneration was fixed to pay the artists, a model that triggered a fierce dispute between radio stations to form its professional and exclusive casts with popular stars of Brazilian music and also philharmonic orchestras. The most important samba singers, such as Carmen Miranda, started signing advantageous contracts to work exclusively with a certain radio station. The institution of auditorium programs created the need to set up big radio orchestras, conducted by arranging conductors, which gave a more sophisticated look to Brazilian popular music. One of the most notorious orchestral formations on the radio was the Orquestra Brasileira – under the command of conductor Radamés Gnatalli and with a team of musicians such as the sambistas João da Baiana, Bide and Heitor dos Prazeres in percussion -, which combined standards of the international song at that time with popular instruments in Brazilian music, such as the cavaquinho. The Orquestra Brasileira was notable for the success of the program Um milhão de melodias (One million melodies), by Rádio Nacional, one of the most popular in the history of Brazilian radio.

In this golden age of radio broadcasting in Brazil, a new generation of composers from the middle class emerged, such as Ary Barroso, Ataulfo Alves, Braguinha, Lamartine Babo and Noel Rosa, who have built successful careers in this media. Grown up in the Vila Isabel middle-class neighborhood, Noel Rosa was instrumental in destigmatizing the samba do Estácio. Although he started his musical trajectory by composing Northeastern emboladas and similar Brazilian rural music genres, the composer changed his style by having contact with the samba made and sung by the sambistas from Estácio and others hills of Rio. This meeting resulted in friendships and partnerships between Noel and names as Ismael Silva and Cartola. Among singers, in addition to Noel himself, a new generation of performers broke out, such as Jonjoca, Castro Barbosa, Luís Barbosa, Cyro Monteiro, Dilermando Pinheiro, Aracy de Almeida, Marília Batista. Another highlight was the singer Carmen Miranda, the greatest star of Brazilian popular music at that time and the first artist to promote samba internationally. Renowned in Brazil, Carmen continued her successful artistic career in the United States, where she worked in musicals in New York City and, later, in Hollywood cinema. Her popularity was such that she even performed at the White House for President Franklin D. Roosevelt.

The consolidation of samba as the flagship of the radio programming of Rio de Janeiro was characterized by the association of the musical genre with the image of white artists, who, even when proletarianized, were more palatable to the preference of the public, while the poor black sambistas remained normally on the sidelines of this process as a mere supplier of compositions for the white performers or as instrumentalists accompanying them. This strong presence of white singers and composers was also decisive for the acceptance and appreciation of samba by the economic and cultural elites of Brazil. From this, the middle class started to recognize the value of the rhythm invented by black Brazilians. The Municipal Theater of Rio became the stage for elegant carnival balls attended by the high society. Having contact with the popular genre through samba and choro circles meetings, the renowned conductor Heitor Villa-Lobos promoted a musical meeting between the American maestro Leopold Stokowski with the sambistas Cartola, Zé da Zilda, Zé Espinguela, Donga, João da Baiana and others. The recording results were edited in the United States on several 78 rpm discs. Another privileged space for the white, rich elite in the Brazilian society was the casinos, which peaked in Brazil during the 1930s and 1940s. In addition to working with games of chance, these elegant amusement houses offered restaurant and bar services and were the stage for shows – among which samba also featured prominently. Thus, the casinos signed exclusive contracts with major artists, as was the case with Carmen Miranda as a big star at Cassino da Urca. In an unusual event for the universe of sambistas on the hill, composer Cartola performed for a month at the luxurious Casino Atlântico, in Copacabana, in 1940.

The consolidation of samba among Brazilian elites was also influenced by the valorization of the ideology of miscegenation in vogue with the construction of nationalism under the Getulio Vargas regime. From an image of a symbol of national backwardness, the mestizo became a representative of Brazilian singularities, and samba, with its mestizo origin, ended up linked to the construction of national identity. Having acted decisively for the growth of radio in Brazil, the Vargas government perceived samba as a vital element in the construction of this idea of miscegenation. Samba's triumph over the airwaves allowed it to penetrate all sectors of Brazilian society.

Especially under the Estado Novo, whose ideological cultural policy of reconceptualizing the popular and extolling everything that was considered an authentic national expression, samba was elevated to the position of major national symbol of the country and the official pace of the country. (Note: "Samba, no longer that samba inscribed in its transit project by society, became the official rhythm of the country, and as such, it has had a history. Only a story in which the past was remade according to the present.") However, one of the concerns of the Vargas regime was to interfere in music production to promote samba as a means of "pedagogical" socialization, that is, by banning compositions that confront the regime's ethics. In this quest to "civilize" samba, political bodies such as the Department of Press and Propaganda (DIP, Departamento de Imprensa e Propaganda) took action to order sambas that would exalt the work and censor lyrics that addressed bohemia and malandragem, two of the most common themes in the tradition of the urban Carioca samba. Musical contests were also instituted through which public opinion elected its favorite composers and performers.

Under Vargas, samba had an expressive weight in the construction of an image of Brazil abroad and was an important means of cultural and tourist dissemination of the country. In an attempt to reinforce a positive national image, the presence of renowned singers of the kind in presidential committees to Latin American countries has become frequent. At the end of 1937, the sambistas Paulo da Portela and Heitor dos Prazeres participated in a caravan of Brazilian artists to Montevideo that performed at the Gran Exposición Feria Internacional del Uruguay. The Brazilian government also financed an information and popular music program called "Uma Hora do Brasil", produced and broadcast by Radio El Mundo, from Buenos Aires, which had at least one broadcast to Nazi Germany. When the Vargas regime approached the United States, DIP made an agreement to broadcast Brazilian radio programs on hundreds of CBS radio network. Under this context, the samba "Aquarela do Brasil" (by Ary Barroso) was released in the United States market, becoming the first Brazilian song that was very successful abroad and one of the most popular works of the Brazilian popular songbook. In the midst of the good neighborhood policy, the animator Walt Disney visited Portela samba school during his visit to Brazil in 1941, from which he hypothesized that Zé Carioca, a character created by the cartoonist to express the Brazilian way, would have been inspired by the figure of the sambista Paulo da Portela.

The rise of samba as a popular musical genre in Brazil also relied on its dissemination in Brazilian cinema, especially in musical comedies, being an integral part of the soundtrack, the plot or even the main theme of the cinematographic work. The good public acceptance of the short film "A Voz do Carnaval" (by Adhemar Gonzaga) paved the way for several other cinematographic works related to rhythm, many of which had a strong presence of radio idol singers in the cast, such as "Alô, Alô, Brasil!", which had sisters Carmen and Aurora Miranda, Francisco Alves, Mário Reis, Dircinha Batista, Bando da Lua, Almirante, Lamartine Babo, among others. The advent of the popular chanchada films made Brazilian cinema one of the biggest promoters of carnival music. In one of the rare moments when sambistas from the hill starred in radio programs, Paulo da Portela, Heitor dos Prazeres and Cartola led the program "A Voz do Morro", at Rádio Cruzeiro do Sul, in 1941. There, they presented unpublished sambas whose titles were given by listeners. However, over the course of the decade, the samba made by these genuine sambistas was losing space on Brazilian radio to new sub-genres that were being formed, while figures such as Cartola and Ismael Silva were ostracized until they left the music scene in the late 1940s.

=== New sub-genres of samba ===
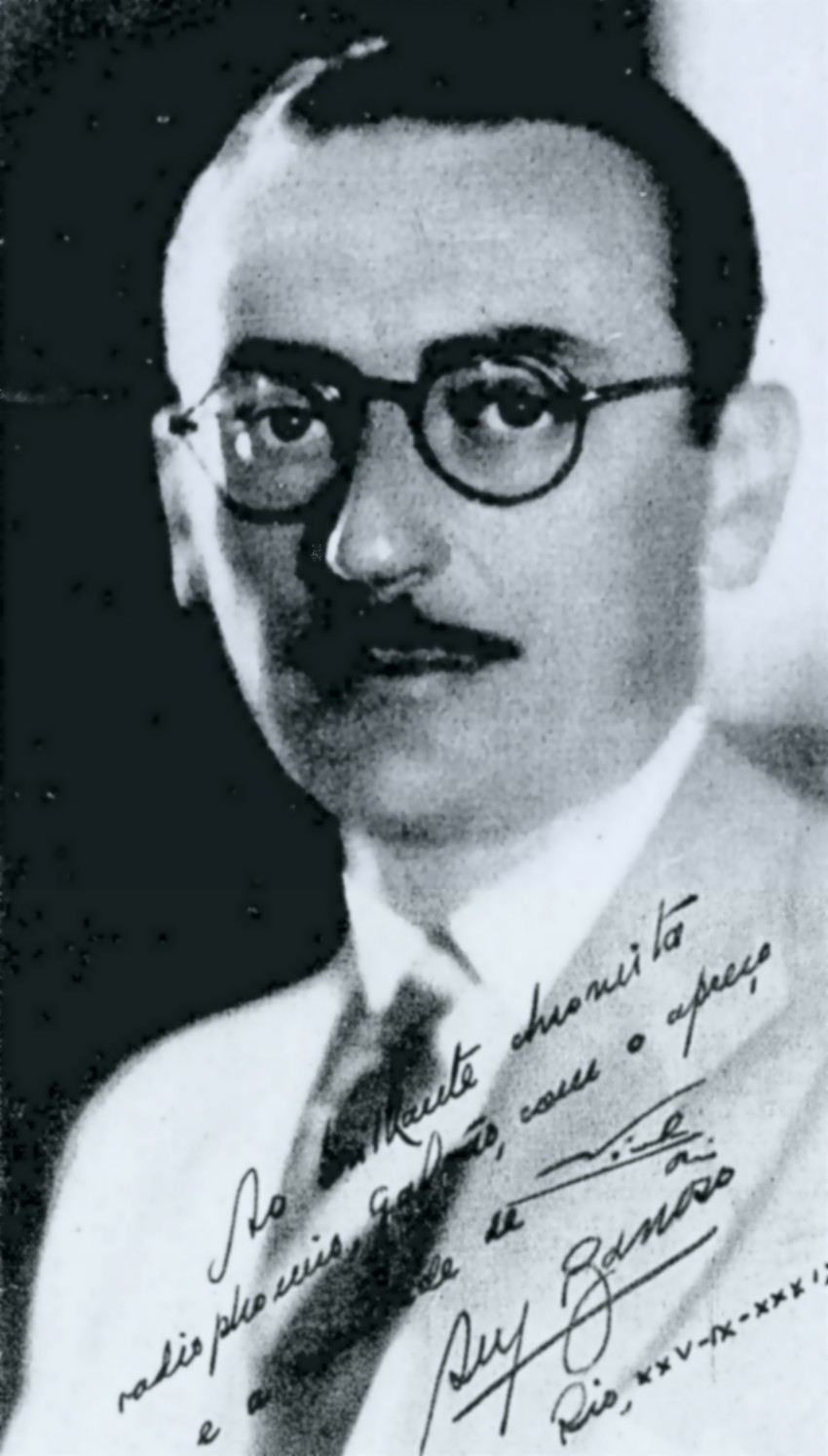
Ary Barroso became one of the major composers of samba in the "golden age" of Brazilian music.

Thanks to its economic exploitation through the radio and the records, samba not only became professional, but also diversified into new sub-genres, many of which were different from the hues originating in the hills of Rio de Janeiro and established by the interests of the Brazilian music industry. The period of Brazilian music between 1929 and 1945 marked by the arrival of radio and electromagnetic recording of sound in the country and by the notability of major composers and singers, – the so-called "golden age" registered several styles of samba, some with greater and others with less solidity.

Publications devoted to the topic disseminated a broad conceptual terminology, including denominations later enshrined in new sub-genres – such as samba-canção, samba-choro, samba-enredo, samba-exaltação, samba-de-terreiro, samba de breque -, as well as registered scores and released labels and album covers printed various nomenclatures for samba in an attempt to express a functional, rhythmic or thematic trend – such as "samba à moda baiana" (samba in the Bahian style), "samba-batucada", "samba-jongo", "samba-maxixe" -, although some sounded quite inconsistent – such as "samba à moda agrião" (samba in the watercress style), "samba epistolar" (epistolary samba) and "samba fonético" (phonetic samba). In other cases, it was music critics that imputed pejorative labels with a view to disapproving certain aesthetic changes or fashion trends – as in the disparagingly called sambalada and sambolero for stylistic nuances the samba-canção.

Established in the radio era as one of the main sub-genres of samba, the samba-canção style emerged among professional musicians who played in the revues of Rio de Janeiro in the late 1920s and early 1930s. Although the term began to circulating in the press in 1929 to mistakenly designate "Jura", by Sinhô, and "Diz que me amas", by J. Machado, the starting point of the line was "Linda Flor (Ai, Ioiô)", a melody by Henrique Vogeler and lyrics by Luis Peixoto, (Note: With a melody composed by pianist Henrique Vogeler, "Linda Flor" had three different versions for each lyrics, the most famous of which was "Ai, Ioiô", written by Luis Peixoto. According to José Ramos Tinhorão, the first version, entitled "Linda Flor" and recorded by Vicente Celestino at Odeon, displayed on the disc label, for the first time, the expression "samba-canção". On the other hand, Tinhorão comments that Celestino's voice and his operatic style were not appropriate to the configuration of the new sub-genre: "his voice emission ... did not allow to recognize the right dose of samba rhythmic balance, which Henrique Vogeler tried to introduce as a disturbing element of the classic melody of the song. ") released in the revue and on disc by singer Aracy Cortes. In general, the samba-canção was characterized as a slower tempo variant, with a dominance of the melodic line over the rhythmic marking that basically explores the subjectivity of subjectivity and feeling. As their releases took place outside the carnival season, the trend was linked to the so-called "mid-year samba". However, during the 1930s, the term samba-canção was used arbitrarily to designate many compositions contained under the name of "samba de meio de ano" ("mid-year samba"), but which did not fit as samba-canção themselves. On the other hand, many sambas at the time of their releases would later be recognized as samba-canção, as in the case of works by Noel Rosa and Ary Barroso. Not by chance, Zuza Homem de Mello and Jairo Severiano consider that this samba style was truly inaugurated with the second version of the song "No rancho fundo", with melody by Ary Barroso and lyrics by Lamartine Babo.

Basically, Carnaval was reserved for the launch of marchinhas and sambas-enredo, a sub-genre typified in this way in the 1930s because of the lyrics and melody, which must comprise the poetic summary of the theme chosen by the samba school for its carnival parade. Samba-de-terreiro – or also samba de quadra – was a short-tempo samba modality, with the second most measured part that prepares the bateria for a more lively return to the beginning. Its format was also consolidated in the 1930s.

Also from that time, samba-choro – at first called choro-canção or choro-cantado – was a syncopated hybrid sub-genre of samba with the instrumental music genre choro, but with medium tempo and presence of lyrics. Created by the Brazilian music industry, it was released, with all indications, with "Amor em excesso", by Gadé and Valfrido Silva, in 1932. (Note: The disc label, however, only showed the indication of choro music genre.) One of the most popular sambas of this variant is "Carinhoso", by Pixinguinha, released as choro in 1917, received lyrics and ended up relaunched two decades later, in the voice of Orlando Silva, with great commercial success. In the following decade, Waldir Azevedo would popularize chorinho, a kind of fast-moving instrumental samba.

Widespread during the Estado Novo, samba-exaltação was a sub-genre marked by the character of grandeur, expressed notably by the extensive melody, the lyrics with a patriotic-ufanist theme and by the lavish orchestral arrangement. Its great paradigm was "Aquarela do Brasil", by Ary Barroso. From the huge success of the first version recorded by Francisco Alves, in 1939, samba-exaltação started to be well cultivated by professional composers in the musical theater and in the music industry and radio media. Another well-known samba of this type was "Brasil Pandeiro", by Assis Valente, a huge hit with the vocal group Anjos do Inferno in 1941.

At the turn of the 1940s, samba de breque emerged, a sub-genre marked by a markedly syncopated rhythm and sudden stops called breques (from English word break, Brazilian term for car brakes), to which the singer added spoken comments, generally humorous in character, alluding to the theme. The singer Moreira da Silva consolidated himself as the great name of this sub-genre.

=== Samba-canção hegemony and influences of foreign music ===
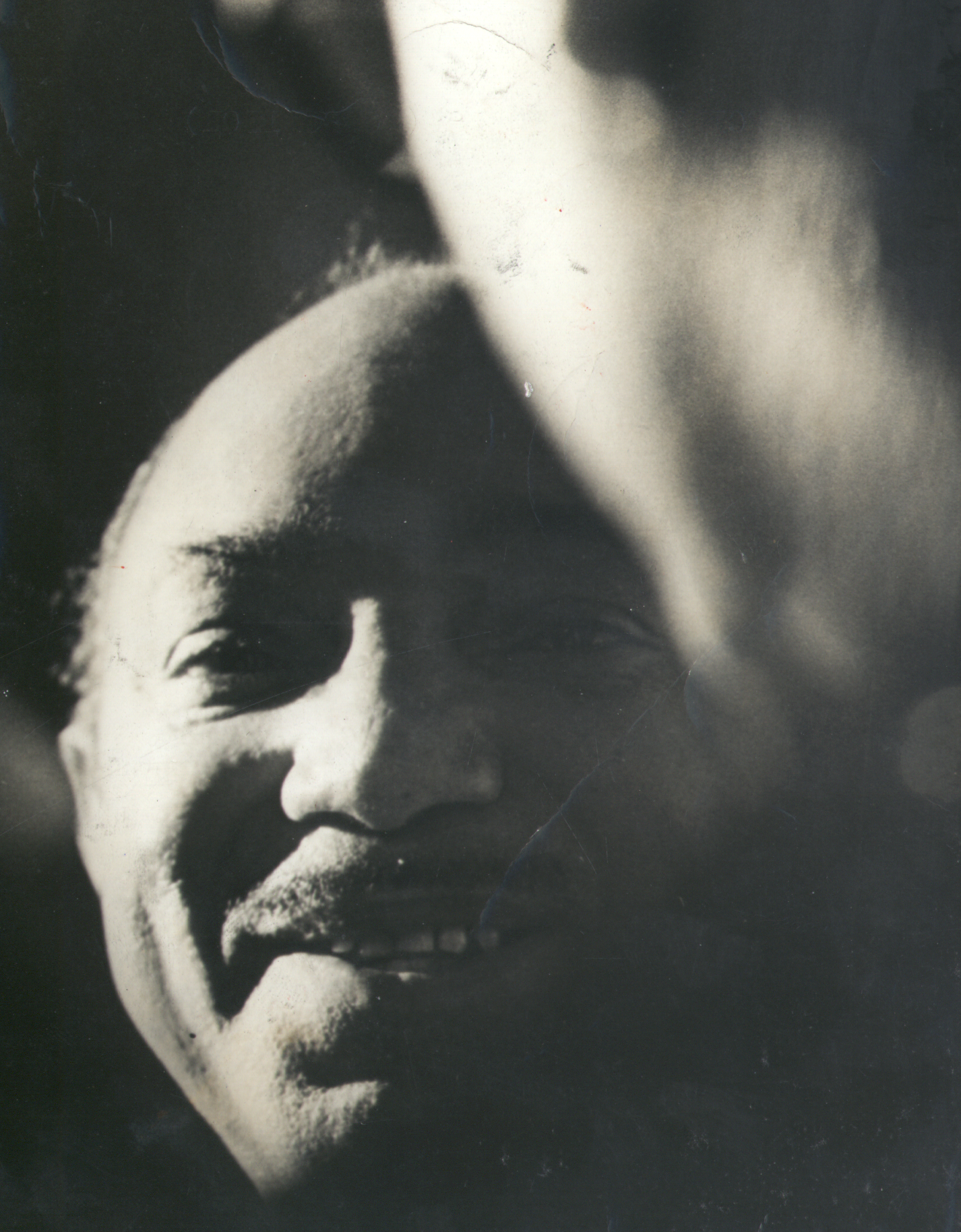
The composer Lupicínio Rodrigues, author of some of the great classics of the samba-canção style.

After the end of the World War II and the consequent growth in the production of consumer goods, radio sets spread in the Brazilian market in different models and at affordable prices to the different social class of the Brazilian population. Within this context, Brazilian radio broadcasting also went through a moment of change in language and audience that made radio an even more popular media in Brazil. In search of easier communication with the listener, the programming standard became more sensational, melodramatic and appealing. One of the best expressions of this new format and the new popular audience was the auditorium programs and the "kings" and "radio queen" contests. Although they played a role in legitimizing samba as a cultural product and national symbol music and also transforming popular musical culture with the circulation of new musical genres and more extroverted performances, auditorium programs such as the paradigmatic "Programa César de Alencar" and "Programa Manoel Barcelos" – both on Radio Nacional, leader in audience and main media of communication in Brazil – stimulated the cult of personality and the private life of artists, whose apex was the collective frenzy generated around the fan clubs of popular music stars during the concourses of kings and queens of the radio.

For the samba more linked to the traditions of Estácio and the hills, the 1950s was characterized by the vitalizing presence of old and new composers who led the renewal of the genre for the next years. This renewal was present in the sambas of well-known authors from the general public, such as Geraldo Pereira and Wilson Batista, of lesser-known sambistas but active in their communities, such as Zé Keti and Nelson Cavaquinho – a composer who would establish a great partnership with Guilherme de Brito – and also of new composers, such as Monsueto. The samba de breque by Jorge Veiga also stood out and, in São Paulo, the Demônios da Garoa enshrined the sambas by Adoniran Barbosa. Missing for many years, samba composer Cartola was found washing cars in Ipanema by journalist Sérgio Porto, who took him to sing on Rádio Mayrink Veiga and got him a job at a newspaper. As part of the celebrations of the Fourth Centenary of the city of São Paulo, the composer Almirante organized the "Festival da Velha Guarda" ("Old Guard Festival"), which brought together great names of Brazilian popular music then forgotten, such as Donga, Ismael Silva, and Pixinguinha.

However, the period between the second half of the 1940s and the end of the 1950s – well known as post-war – was deeply characterized by the prestige and dominance of samba-canção in the Brazilian music scene. Although in its time of appearance there were not so many releases characteristic of this aspect, many achieved huge commercial success and, in the mid-1940s, this sub-genre began to dominate Brazilian radio programming and be the most played style outside the carnival era. This rise of samba-canção as a hegemonic musical style was also accompanied mainly by the avalanche of foreign musical genres – imported to Brazil under the political-cultural context of World War II – that began to compete in the country's market with the samba-canção itself. Tango and, especially, bolero, which occupied a significant part of radio programming, proliferated in clubs and dance halls in Rio de Janeiro and São Paulo. Music from the United States has also come to occupy a large part of the programming of Brazilian radio stations. With big bands in evidence, some radio stations made great publicity about jazz, a genre that was gaining more and more appreciation among some musicians from Rio de Janeiro, especially those who worked in nightclubs. In a samba-canção rhythm, many boleros, foxtrots and French songs were also part of the repertoire of nightclub pianists.

Under the influence of the strong penetration of these imported genres, the post-war samba-canção itself was influenced by these rhythms. In certain cases, the change occurred through a musical treatment based on the cool jazz tones and more restrained vocal performances, and more complex melodic-harmonic structures, distinct, therefore, from the rhythmic-bodily sensuality of traditional samba. In other cases, it was due to the strong passionate exercised by bolero and foreign sentimental ballads. Both influences displeased the more traditionalist critics: in the first, they accused the samba-canção of having "jazzed up", especially for the sophisticated orchestra arrangements; in the second, the slower and more romantic progress of the slope led to pejorative labels such as "sambolero" or "sambalada". In fact, the orchestral accompaniments of the samba-canção at that time were marked by arrangements containing woodwinds and strings that replaced the traditional regional musical ensemble (Note: The regional is a kind of musical ensemble in Brazil generally formed by one or more instruments with a melodic function, such as flute and mandolin; cavaquinho, with an important rhythmic role and can also assume part of the harmony; one or more guitars, forming the harmonic basis of the ensemble; and the pandeiro acting in the marking of the base rhythm.) and made it possible to dramatize the arrangements in accordance with the theme of the songs and the expressiveness of the singers. If, for some critics, these orchestral and melodic-harmonic attributes of modern 1950s samba-canção came from post-war American culture, for others this influence was much more Latin American than North American. Another aesthetic mark of the period was the vocal performance of the singers of this style of samba, sometimes more inclined to the lyrical power and expressiveness, sometimes more supported by an intonation and close to the colloquial dynamics.

With a new generation of performers that emerged in the post-war period, the Brazilian music scene was taken over by emotional and painful samba-canção songs in the 1950s. This sub-genre was divided between a more traditional and a more modern generation. If in the first group there were composers such as Lupicínio Rodrigues and Herivelto Martins and interpreters such as Nelson Gonçalves, Dalva de Oliveira, Angela Maria, Jamelão, Cauby Peixoto and Elizeth Cardoso, the second group had as main exponents Dick Farney, Lúcio Alves, Tito Madi, Nora Ney, Dolores Duran, Maysa and Sylvia Telles, among others. The modern samba-canção was also part of a phase of Dorival Caymmi's career and the beginning of the musical work of Antonio Carlos Jobim, one of the great names of the new style of samba that would stylistically mark the genre and Brazilian music in the coming years.

=== Bossa nova, the new revolution in samba ===
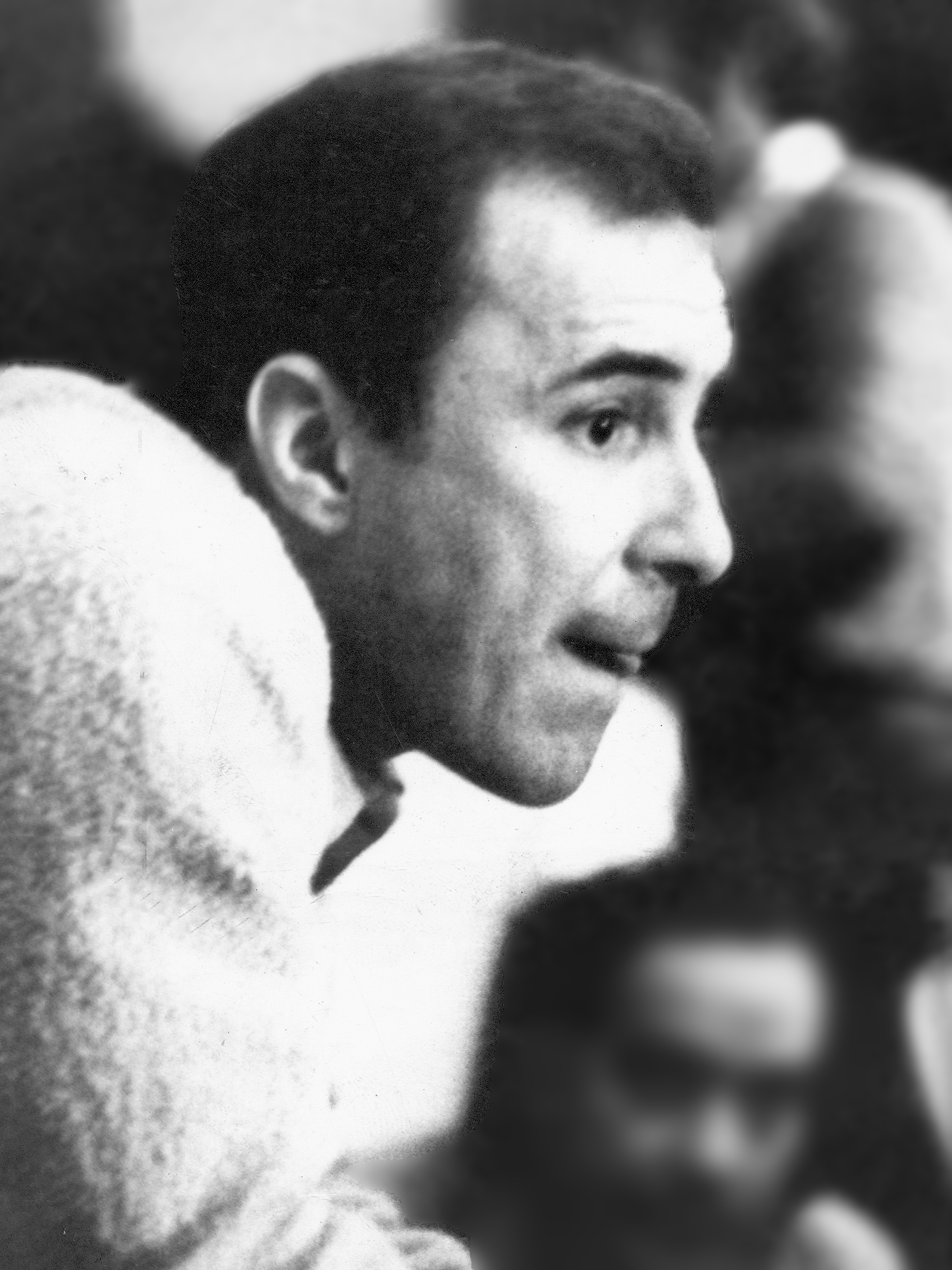
The composer João Gilberto, an originator of bossa nova.

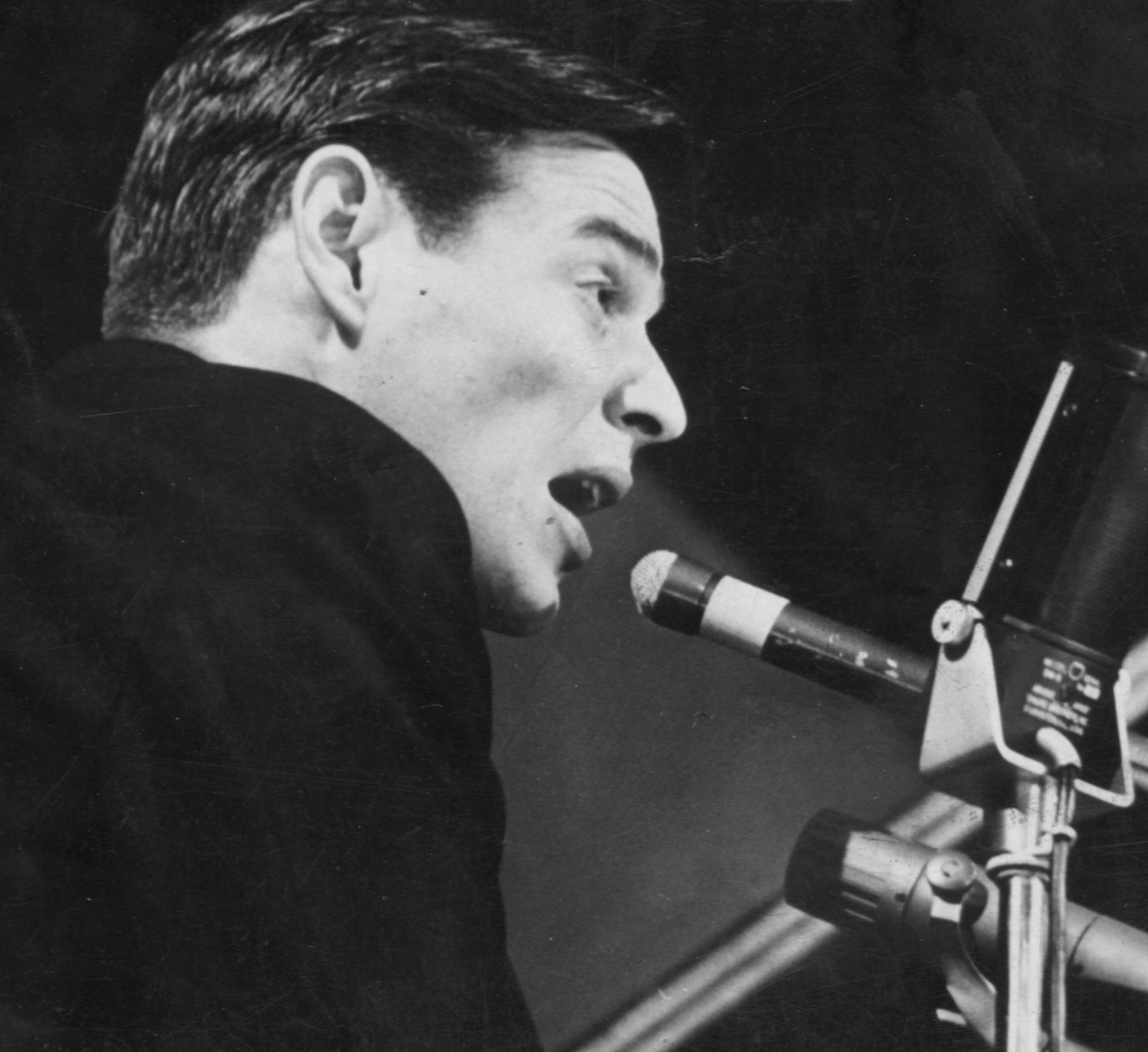
The composer Antonio Carlos Jobim, author of classic bossa nova sambas.

The period between Juscelino Kubitschek's inauguration in 1956, until the political crisis in the João Goulart government that culminated in the 1964 Brazilian coup d'état, was characterized by great effervescence on the Brazilian music scene, especially in Rio de Janeiro. Although it lost its status as the country's capital after the inauguration of Brasília, the city maintained its position as a major cultural hub in the country and urban samba, whose transformations on the radio, the music industry, nightclubs and among the circles of university middle class youth resulted in bossa nova – a term by which a new style of rhythmic accompaniment and interpretation of samba spread from the South Zone of Rio de Janeiro became known.

At a time when the appeal to the traditional was gaining new momentum, bossa nova would mark the entire structure of creation and listening supported by established genres, considering that it sought a renewal within the tradition of samba. Initially called "modern samba" by the Brazilian music critic, this new sub-genre was officially inaugurated with the composition "Chega de Saudade", by Antonio Carlos Jobim and Vinicius de Moraes, released in 1958 in two versions: one sung by Elizeth Cardoso and the other with the singer, songwriter, and guitarist João Gilberto. A Bahian-born living in Rio, Gilberto radically changed the way of interpreting samba until then, changing the harmonies with the introduction of unconventional guitar chords and revolutionizing the classic syncope of the genre with a unique rhythmic division. These formal Gilbertian experiences were consolidated in the studio album Chega de Saudade, released in 1959, and triggered the emergence of an artistic movement around Gilberto and others professional artists such as Antonio Carlos Jobim, Vinicius de Moraes, Baden Powell, Alaíde Costa, Sylvia Telles, among others, which attracted young amateur musicians from the South Zone of Rio – almost all from the middle class and with university degrees – such as Carlos Lyra, Roberto Menescal, Ronaldo Boscoli and Nara Leão.

Consolidated in the following years as a type of concert samba, non-dancing, and comparable to American cool jazz, bossa nova has become a sambistic sub-genre of great reputation on the Brazilian music scene and, with its rhythm, more assimilable abroad than traditional samba, became known worldwide. After being released on the American market in a series of concerts in New York City in late 1962, Brazilian bossa nova albums were reissued in several countries, while new songs and albums were recorded, including with foreign artists. Several of these works – with the samba "The Girl from Ipanema", by Antonio Carlos Jobim and Vinicius de Moraes, at the frontline – became major international successes. However, in the midst of the turbulence that marked the Brazilian political scene at the time, the movement suffered a dissent, which resulted in the so-called "nationalist current". With the intention of carrying out a work more engaged and aligned with the social context of the period, the nationalist bossa-novistas formed around Nara Leão, Carlos Lyra, Sérgio Ricardo, Edu Lobo, and the partnership between Vinicius de Moraes and Baden Powell, the latter two signing a fertile partnership that resulted in the studio album "Os Afro-sambas", with positive international impact.

In addition to bossa nova, other new samba sub-genres emerged in this period between the late 1950s and early 1960s. The rise of nightclubs as the main nightlife venues in Rio disseminated variety shows with the participation of sambistas and samba dancers, mainly performed by instrumental musical ensemble with keyboard, electric guitar, acoustic bass guitar, drums and percussion, and performed by crooners. A trend in the 1960s live music in Brazil, this format of "samba to dance" resulted in styles such as the sambalanço – a very lively and dancing type of samba, from which musicians such as Ed Lincoln and performers such as Sílvio César, Pedrinho Rodrigues, Orlandivo, Miltinho and Elza Soares stood out. In this same environment, samba-jazz also emerged, consolidated with the success of bossa nova that brought samba and bebop closer together, initially based on the piano-bass-drums musical ensemble and later broader formations. Also under this context, the composer Jorge Ben emerged with his peculiar and hybrid way of playing samba, mixing elements of bossa nova and American blues and rock'n'roll that would even take samba songs such as "Mas que Nada" and "Chove Chuva", released by Sérgio Mendes & Brazil '66, to the Billboard charts. And at the end of the 1960s, samba funk emerged, led by pianist Dom Salvador, which mixed the two beats to the bar of samba and the four beats to the bar of American funk that had just arrived in the Brazilian music market at that time.

The period was also characterized by the profusion of some partner dance samba styles. These were the cases of Samba de Gafieira, a dance style developed in the ballroom dance of suburban clubs in Rio de Janeiro frequented by people with low purchasing power throughout the 1940s and 1950s and which also became a fad among upper-middle-class people in the 1960s, and the samba rock, a dance style born in the São Paulo suburban parties in the 1960s, mixing steps from samba, rock and Caribbean rhythms such as rumba and salsa. The "bailes blacks" ("black balls") experienced their peak notably in Rio and São Paulo in the 1970s, a time of great diffusion of the American black music in Brazil, which were frequently disseminated at these "bailes blacks". This also generated a new debate among the Brazilian music critic about the foreign influence on Brazilian music and also on samba itself.

=== Traditional samba as "resistance music" ===
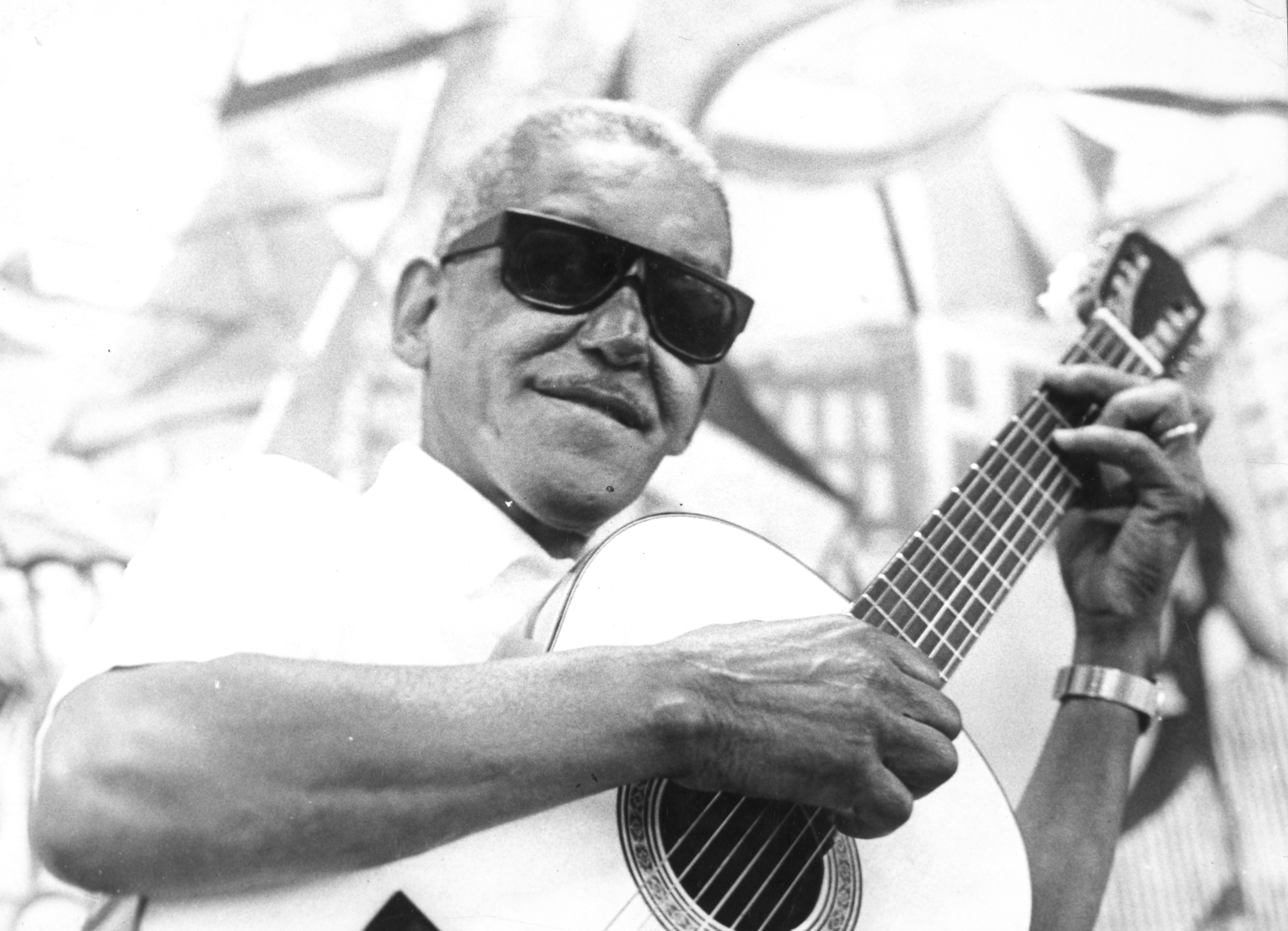
The sambista Cartola experienced the resurgence of his musical career in the 1960s and 1970s.

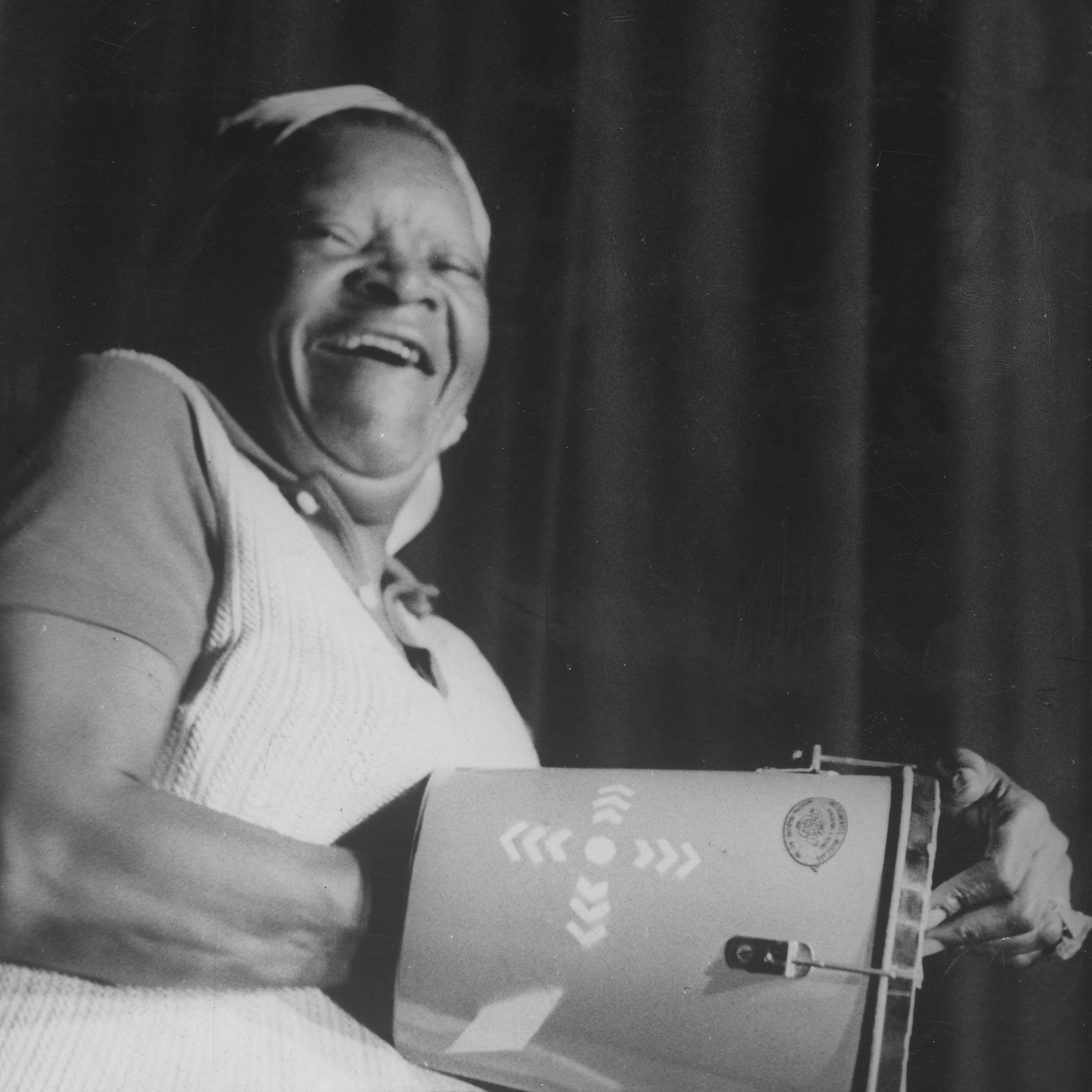
Clementina de Jesus recorded her first LP only at the age of 65.

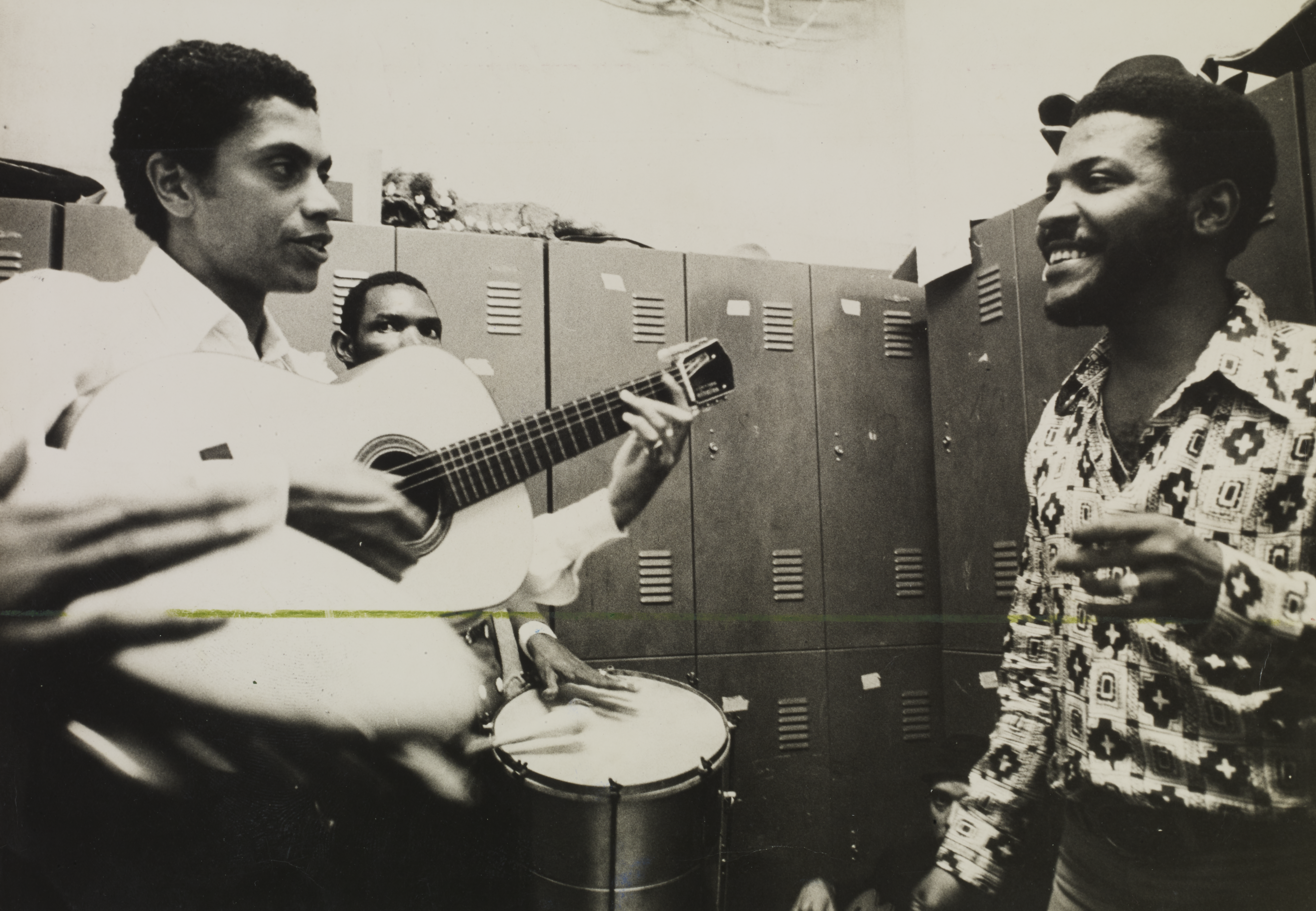
Paulinho da Viola and Martinho da Vila started their musical careers in the 1960s.

In 1962, the "Carta do samba" ("The samba letter") was made public, a document written by the writer Edison Carneiro that expressed the need to preserve traditional features of samba, such as the syncopa, without, however, "denying or taking away spontaneity and prospects for progress". This letter came to meet a series of circumstances that made traditional urban samba not only revalued in different Brazilian cultural circles, but also started to be considered by them as a kind of "counter-hegemonic" and "resistance music" in the Brazilian music scene. In a decade characterized in the Brazilian music industry by the domination of international rock music and its Brazilian variant, Jovem Guarda, the traditional samba would have started to be seen as an expression of the greatest authenticity and purity of the genre, which led to the creation of terms such as "samba autêntico" ("authentic samba"), "samba de morro" ("samba of the hill"), "samba de raiz" ("roots samba"), or "samba de verdade" ("real samba").

One of the major expressions of this "resistance samba" in the first half of the 1960s was Zicartola, a bar opened by sambista Cartola and his wife Dona Zica in 1963. which transformed in a short time at a famous meeting point of veteran sambistas, attracted the attendance of many left-wing intellectuals and students, and became famous for its samba nights that, in addition to revealing new talents, such as Paulinho da Viola, revived the careers of former composers then ostracized from the music industry. In February 1964, the year of the Brazilian military coup d'état, Nara Leão's debut album was released, which included sambas by traditional samba composers such as Cartola, Elton Medeiros, Nelson Cavaquinho and Zé Keti, as well as samba songs from the bossa nova nationalist branch. And at the end of that year, Nara Leão met with Zé Keti and João do Vale for the musical Show Opinião, which became a reference as an artistic manifestation in protest to the authoritarian regime established.

The following year, the composer Hermínio Bello de Carvalho produced Rosa de Ouro, a musical that launched the sixty-year-old Clementina de Jesus to the general public. It was the birth of the professional artistic career of one of the most expressive voices in the samba history, characterized by a repertoire aimed at the African music matrixes, such as jongos, curimbas, lundus and sambas of the rural tradition. The music ensemble to accompany Clementina in this show was composed by Paulinho da Viola, Elton Medeiros, Anescarzinho do Salgueiro, Jair do Cavaquinho and Nelson Sargento. Known at the time as "regional", these musical ensemble based on classical guitar, cavaquinho and pandeiro, and occasionally some wind instrument, were revalued and became associated with the idea of a more authentic and genuine samba. From then on, the idea of forming samba vocal-instrumental groups for professional presentations matured and, with the success obtained by groups such as A Voz do Morro and Os Cinco Crioulos, boosted the creation of other groups composed only by sambistas with direct or indirect ties with the samba schools in the following years, such as the groups Os Originais do Samba, Nosso Samba, Brazil Ritmo 67, Os Batuqueiros, Exporta-samba, among others. Two other significant performances from this moment of aesthetic revaluation of traditional urban samba were "Telecoteco opus N ° 1", with Cyro Monteiro and Dilermando Pinheiro, which was shown at Teatro Opinião, and "O samba pede passagem", which brought together veterans Ismael Silva and Aracy de Almeida with the young artists Baden Powell, Sidney Miller and MPB4, among others.

In this context of the effervescence of the samba resistance movements, the radio show "Adelzon Alves, o amigo da madrugada" ("Adelzon Alves, the friend of the dawn") has appeared. Presented by radio broadcaster Adelzon Alves on Rádio Globo in Rio de Janeiro, the radio program dedicated a repertoire exclusively dedicated to the samba – in a scenario in which radio before the supremacy of television as a major means of communication in Brazil had become a disseminator of music recorded on disc. Faced with the hegemony of Anglo-American rock and Jovem Guarda, especially due to the influence of record labels on commercial broadcasters in the country, Adelzon Alves' radio show became the main spokesman for samba and sambistas from Rio de Janeiro on the media and a major propagator of terms, which reverberate until today, referring to the legacy of the universe of "samba do morro" as national music "of resistance" and "root".

In addition to the strength of Jovem Guarda, a movement catapulted by the eponymous program shown by TV Record, Brazilian music at that time experienced the emergence of a new generation of post-bossa-nova artists who, reknowed in the scope of the "Brazilian song festivals" era, became the embryo of the so-called MPB. One of those most notable names was the composer Chico Buarque, author of sambas such as "Apesar de Você", which became classics of the genre. Against the ideological disputes between the acoustic guitar (an instrument traditional in Brazilian music genres and synonymous with national music) and electric guitars (seen as an "Americanized" instrument in Brazilian music) that characterized these Brazilian song festivals, the beginning sambista Martinho da Vila entered "Menina moça", a stylized samba de partido-alto, in the third Festival of Brazilian Popular Music in 1967. Although its early eliminated in this contest, this samba projected Martinho's name on the music scene of that time, whose subsequent successes paved the way for the affirmation in the music industry of this type of samba characterized by strong chorus and, normally, three solo parts.

As the aesthetic orientation towards young music of that time, these "song festivals" practically ignored the samba, which generated criticism from sambistas such as Elton Medeiros, who claimed the inclusion of the "truly Brazilian music" in these musical contests. Against this trend, the first Bienal do Samba took place in 1968, a year also characterized by the release of Paulinho da Viola's first solo album and also of another studio album by this composer in a duet with Elton Medeiros. At the beginning of the following decade, Paulinho consolidated his prestige with the commercial success of the samba "Foi um rio que passou na minha vida" and also as a producer of the first studio album of the Velha Guarda da Portela samba group.

=== Samba and the expansion of the Brazilian music industry ===
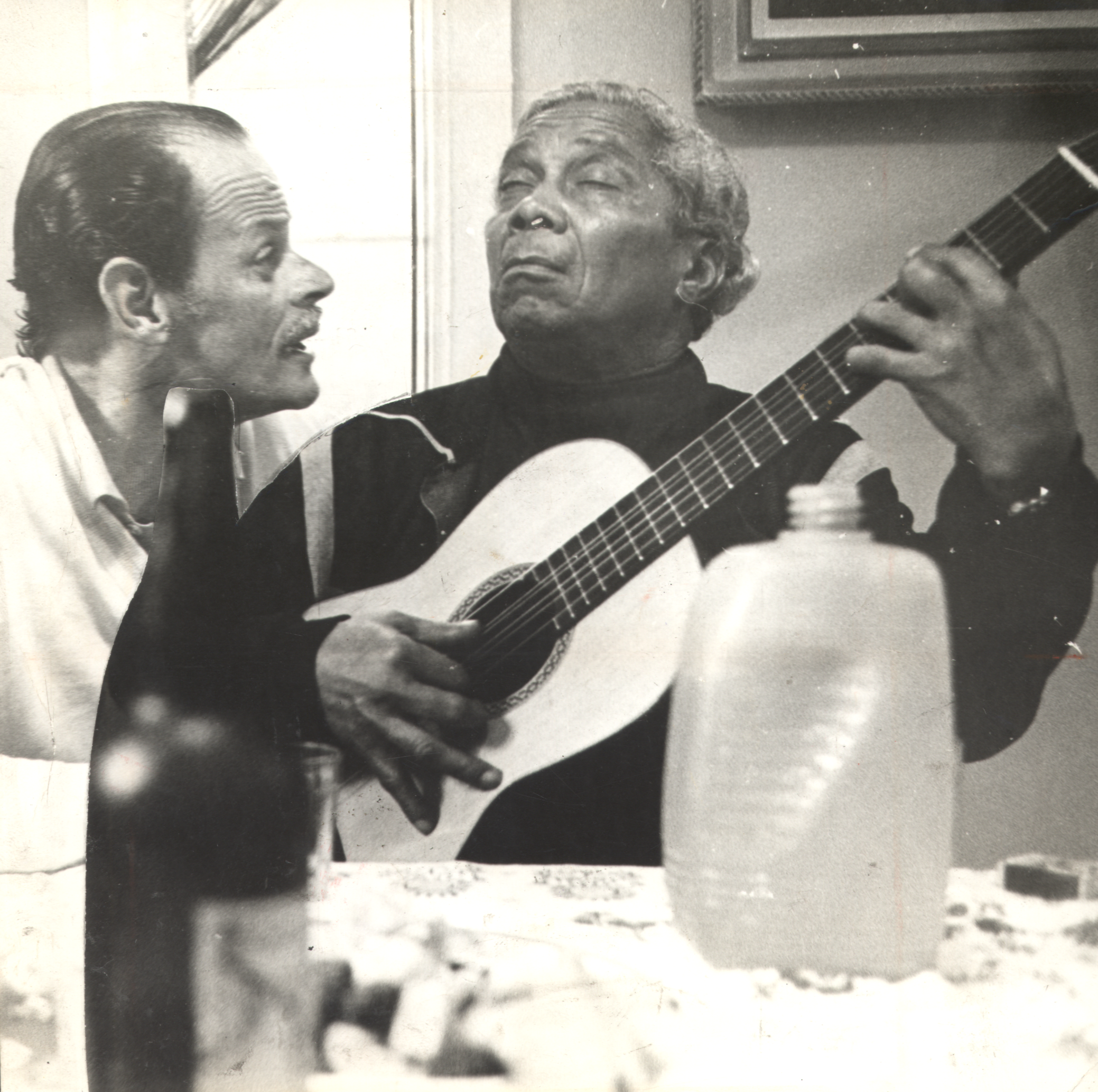
Guilherme de Brito and Nelson Cavaquinho formed one of the great partnerships of samba.

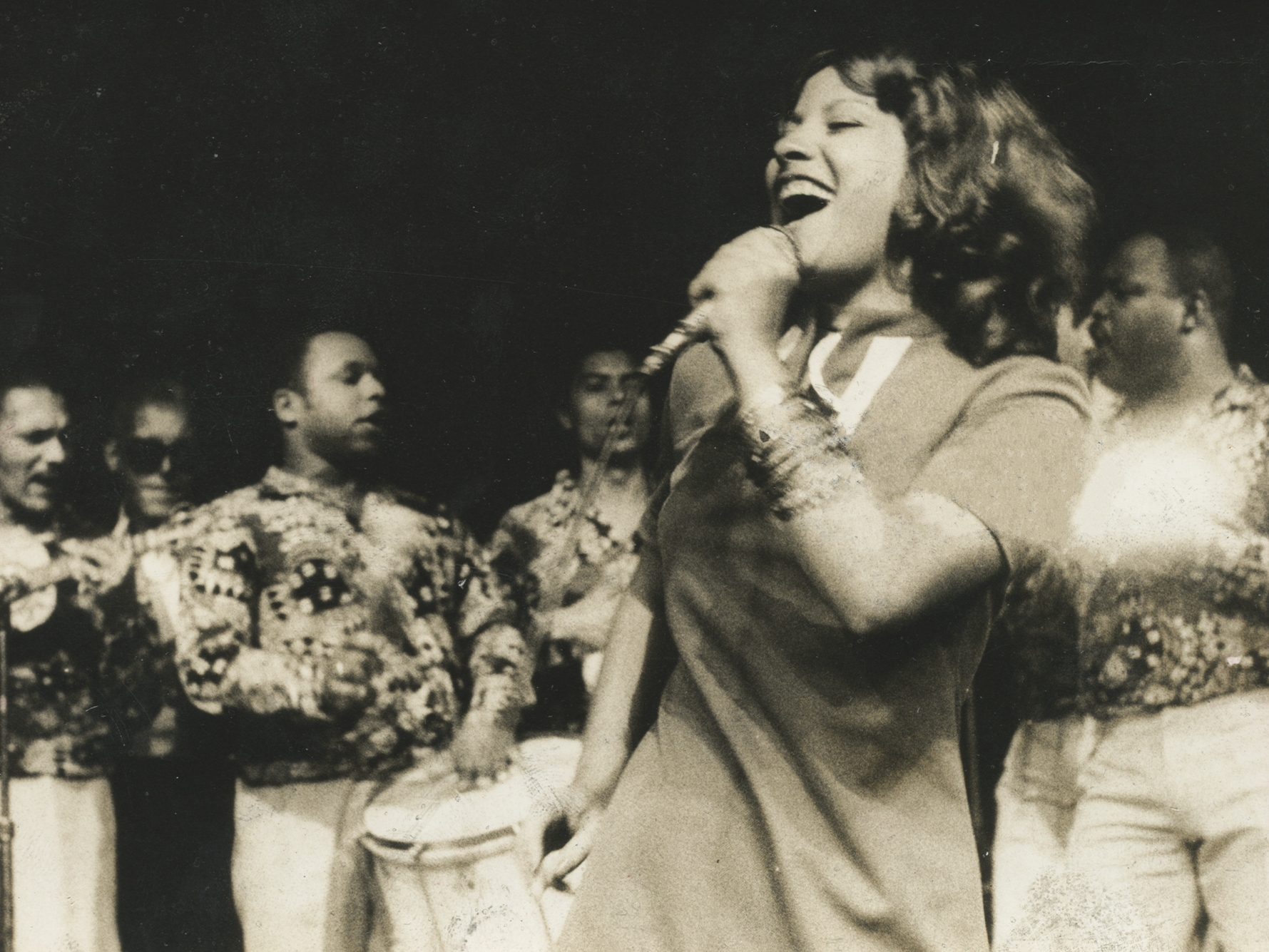
Clara Nunes, the first Brazilian female singer to surpass the mark of 100 thousand copies sold for a single LP.

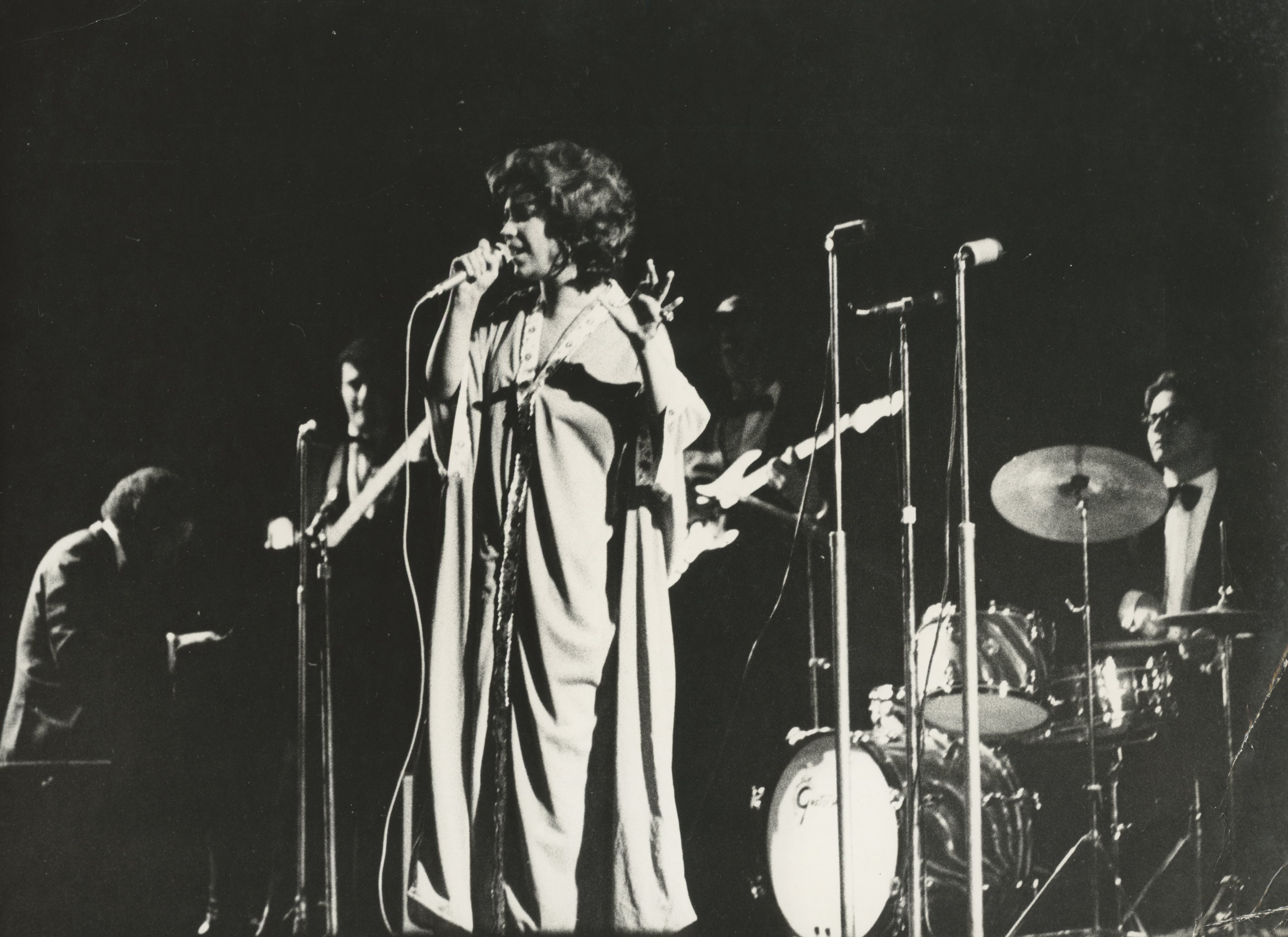
Beth Carvalho, the singer who gave visibility to the "backyard pagodes" in Rio's suburbs.

Between 1968 and 1979, Brazil experienced a huge growth in the production and consumption of cultural goods. During this period, there was a strong expansion of the music industry in the country, which consolidated itself as one of the largest world markets. (Note: According to the Brazilian Association of Record Producers, an official representative body of the record labels in the Brazilian phonographic market, the total record sales jumped from 9.5 million sold in 1968 to 25.45 million in 1975 and reached 52.6 million in 1979.) Among the main factors for the expansion of the Brazilian market were: the consolidation of MPB production stimulated by artists such as Elis Regina, Chico Buarque, Caetano Veloso, Gilberto Gil, Gal Costa, Maria Bethania, (Note: According to the journalist Nelson Motta, the Philips label was, at the end of 1972, "TV Globo for record labels", holding in its cast all the "great" names of Brazilian music of the time, with the exception of Roberto Carlos, who was at Som Livre.) and also in the segment of sentimental songs, drawn sales champion Roberto Carlos; the establishment of LP as a dominant medium format, where it was possible to insert several compositions on the same record, and also made the artist more important than his songs individually; the significant participation of foreign music in the Brazilian market, with the predominance of young music on the country charts, and the growth of the international repertoire on the soap opera soundtracks, mainly on TV Globo.

Another important aspect in the phonographic sector of the period was technological, with a modernization of recording studios in Brazil that approached international technical standards, and the consolidation of foreign record labels in the country, such as EMI and the WEA. This Brazilian entry in the scope of the global cultural industry also profoundly affected the samba universe, which became one of the mass phenomena of the national music market of that decade represented by the appearance, on the list of best selling records of the period, of studio albums by artists such as Martinho da Vila, Originals of Samba, Agepê, Beth Carvalho, Clara Nunes, Alcione, Jair Rodrigues and Benito de Paula, among others, and of sambas-enredo of Rio samba schools.

In the stronghold of traditional samba, the first LPs of veteran composers Donga, Cartola and Nelson Cavaquinho were released. Two other composers already established in this environment, Candeia and Dona Ivone Lara also debuted with solo works in the phonographic market. The same happened in São Paulo with the releases of the first Adoniran Barbosa and Paulo Vanzolini studio albums. Revealed in the previous decade, the sambistas Paulinho da Viola and Martinho da Vila consolidated themselves as two of the great names of success in the samba in the 1970s, which also saw the emergence of singers-songwriters Roberto Ribeiro and João Nogueira. Among the singers of the new generation, the names of Clara Nunes, Beth Carvalho and Alcione emerged as the great female samba singers in the Brazilian music industry, whose good record sales – marked by the appreciation of songs by the composers of the Rio de Janeiro samba schools – contributed greatly for the popularity of samba. In addition to this triad of singers were also added Leci Brandão, who was already a member of the composer wing of Estação Primeira de Mangueira, and Cristina Buarque (sister of Chico Buarque), with a rescue effort for samba and sambistas from samba schools. Among the new composers, Paulo Cesar Pinheiro, Nei Lopes, Wilson Moreira stood out, in addition to the duo Aldir Blanc and João Bosco.

Under this same context of the expansion of samba in the Brazilian phonographic market of the 1970s, the music industry invested in a less traditional and more sentimental line of samba, whose simplified rhythmic structure left percussion – the main feature of samba – a little sideways. Rejected as tacky and kitsch by both the most respected musicians in the country and by critics, this formula was stigmatized under the derogatory term of "sambão-joia". Despite this, this most romantic samba has become a great commercial success in the repertoire of singers such as Luiz Ayrão, Luiz Américo, Gilson de Souza, Benito Di Paula and Agepê, as well as the duo Antônio Carlos e Jocáfi, authors of the world famous samba "Você abusou".

Another bet of the phonographic industry of the time was partido-alto collective records, a traditional form of samba that is often sung in the terreiros (the samba school headquarters) in Rio de Janeiro and in the usual "pagodes" – festive gatherings, with music, food and drink – since the first decades of the 20th century. (Note: "Partido-alto was born from the batucadas' circles, where the group kept the beat, hitting it with the palm of their hands and repeated the surrounding verse. The chorus served as a stimulus for one of the participants to dance samba to the center of the circle and with a gesture or body swing they invited one of the components of the circle to stand upright (a term used to mean the individual who stood with their feet up together waiting for the kick that was the attempt to bring down those who were standing up with their feet). These elements were considered "batuqueiros", that is, good in making batucada, good "kicking" (passing the leg over the partner trying to make him fall).") With remote African roots, this sub-genre is characterized by a highly percussive pandeiro beat (using the palm of the hand in the center of the instrument for snapping), a greater tone harmony (usually played by a set of percussion instruments normally surdo, pandeiro and tamborim and accompanied by a cavaquinho and/or classical guitar) and the art of singing and creating improvised verses, almost always in the character of challenge or contest. This essence based on improvisation was taken to the record studios, where partido-alto became a style with more musicality and made with more concise verses and written solos, instead of improvised and spontaneous singing according to traditional canons. This stylized partido-alto was released on several collective LPs, released during the 1970s, whose titles included the subgenre's own name, such as "Bambas do Partido Alto", "A Fina Flor do Partido Alto" and "Isto Que É Partido Alto", which included samba composers such as Anézio, Aniceto, Candeia, Casquinha, Joãozinho da Pecadora, Luiz Grande and Wilson Moreira, although not all were versed in the art of improvisation. Another artist who stood out as a partideiro was Bezerra da Silva, a singer who would be noteworthy in the following decade with sambas similar to the partido-alto and themed in the world and in the underworld of Rio's favelas.

The 1970s were also a time of major changes in Rio de Janeiro samba schools, and the music industry began to invest in the annual production of LPs of the sambas de enredo presented at the carnival parades. In the early years, it was common to release up to two albums, the first containing the sambas-enredo of the parades and the second with sambas depicting the history of each samba school. Beginning in 1974, the annual release began to focus on a single LP for each first and second division of Rio carnival parades

Even during this period, "rodas de samba" ("samba circles") began to spread as a fever throughout Rio de Janeiro and other Brazilian cities. Originally restricted to the backyards of sambistas' residences and the samba school headquarters, these informal meetings have taken on a new meaning in clubs, theaters, steakhouses, among others, with the promotion of "rodas de samba" with stage and microphones and the participation of sambistas linked to samba schools. Meanwhile, new "rodas de samba" were formed informally in the suburbs of Rio de Janeiro, the result of which would lead to the germ, in the late 1970s, of a new and successful sub-genre of modern samba in the 1980s.

=== Pagode, a new samba renewal ===
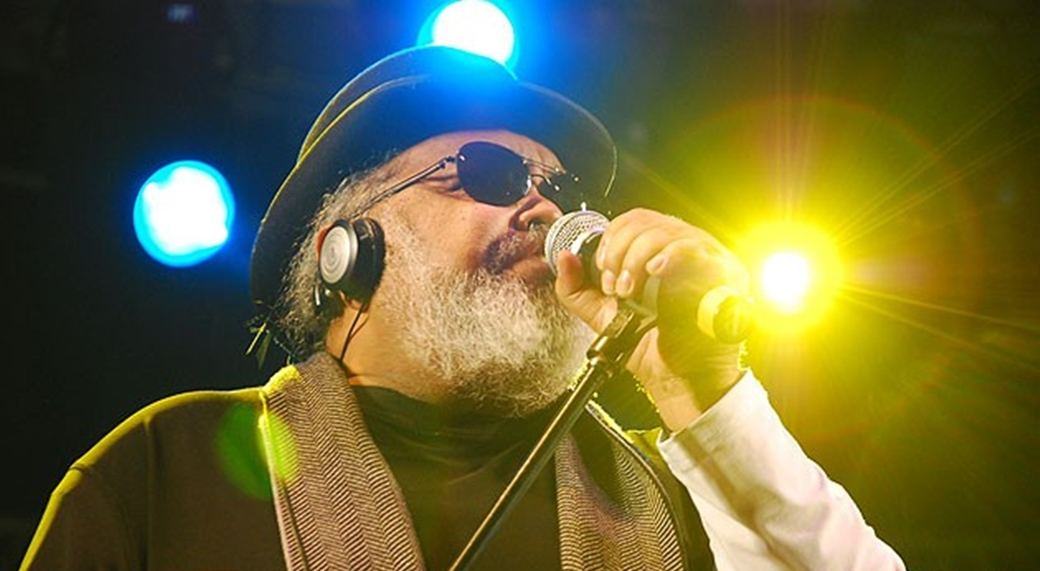
The sambista Jorge Aragão, who was part of Fundo de Quintal first line-up.

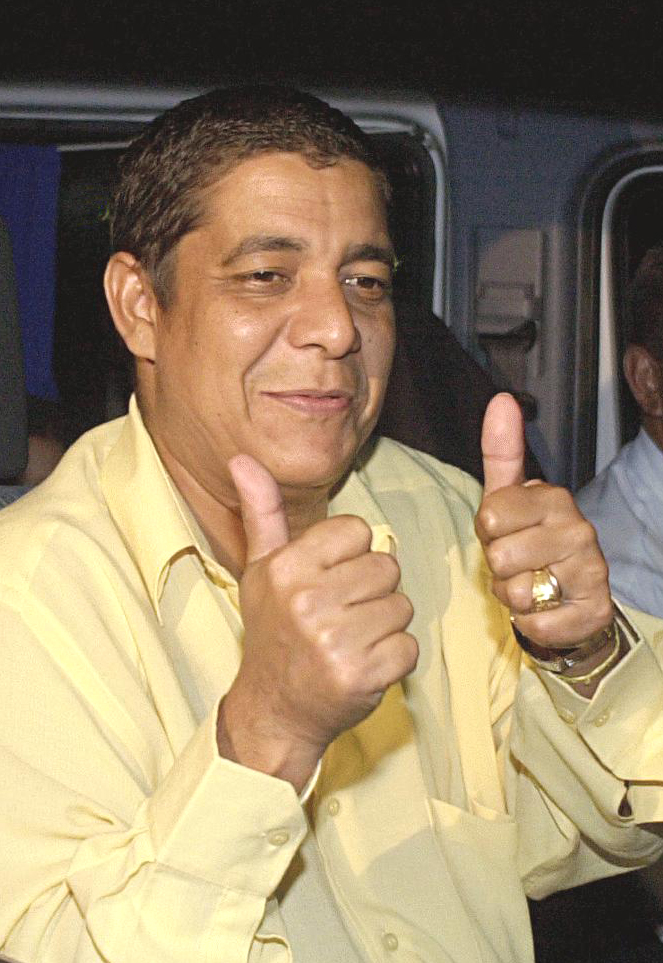
The sambista Zeca Pagodinho, one of the main singers of the pagode.

Originally designated in the samba universe for the musical meetings of sambistas and, soon, also extending to the sambas sung in them, the term pagode became popular with the resignification of the "rodas de samba" in Rio de Janeiro, from the 1970s, with the "pagodes" or "pagodes de mesa" ("pagode circles"), where sambistas gathered around a large table, often located in a residential "backyard", in opposition to the fashionable samba circles made in clubs and the like. Some of the most famous pagodes in the city were the Pagode of Clube do Samba (made at João Nogueira's residence in Méier), Terreirão da Tia Doca (with the rehearsals of the Portela old guard sambists in Oswaldo Cruz), of Pagode of Arlindinho (organized by Arlindo Cruz em Cascadura) and, mainly, the pagode of the carnival block Cacique de Ramos, in the suburban area of Leopoldina.

In the 1980s, pagodes spread rapidly throughout Rio de Janeiro, becoming radiating centers of a new musical language that expressed itself with a new interpretive style of samba that was embedded in the tradition of the partido-alto. Among the innovations of this new samba and marked by refinement in melodies and innovations in harmony and percussion with the accompaniment of instruments such as tan-tan (in place of the surdo), the hand-repique and the four-string banjo with cavaquinho tuning.

The debut of this kind of samba in the recording studios occurred in 1980 with Fundo de Quintal, musical group sponsored by Beth Carvalho. In its first works, Fundo de Quintal gave visibility not only to this new samba, but also to composers such as Almir Guineto, Arlindo Cruz, Jorge Aragão – all members of the group – and Luiz Carlos da Vila – this one linked to the Cacique de Ramos pagodes. On this way opened by Fundo de Quintal, in 1985 the collective studio album called "Raça Brasileira" was released, which revealed to the general public singers such as Jovelina Pérola Negra and Zeca Pagodinho. Especially prioritizing partido-alto sambas, this LP, as well as the works since 1979 by Beth Carvalho, Almir Guineto and the group Fundo de Quintal, formed the new sub-genre that ended up being called pagode by the Brazilian music industry.

The novelty of the pagode in the Brazilian music scene occurred at a time of major reorganization of the music industry in the country, whose investments in the first half of the 1980s had been concentrated mainly on Brazilian rock and children's music. Although some samba artists had some commercial success in the period, such as Bezerra da Silva, Almir Guineto and Agepê – who, in 1984, became the first samba singer to surpass the mark of 1 million copies sold on a single LP -, the moment was not promising for samba in the commercial scope. Very popular performers like Beth Carvalho, Clara Nunes, João Nogueira and Roberto Ribeiro pulled the drop in sales of records of the genre. Disgusted by the little recognition and interest in promoting his work, Paulinho da Viola left the Warner Music label in 1984 and only returned to having an album released at the end of that decade.

With the success of the LP "Raça Brasileira", the pagode phenomenon experienced a period of commercial growth in the Brazilian phonographic market. The main artists in this sub-genre reached the top of the success charts and became known nationally thanks to exposure in the mainstream media and the growing investments of record labels stimulated by huge sales since 1986, pulled by both the LPs of the already established Almir Guineto and Fundo de Quintal – the great paradigm of the subgenre – and for the debut works of Zeca Pagodinho, Marquinhos Satã and Jovelina Pérola Negra. Although there was a certain cooling of the interest of record labels and the media even during the second half of the 1980s, pagode established itself as an important subgenre of samba.

In the 1990s, a new generation of artists emerged who shared, to some extent, similar characteristics, such as the incorporation of musical elements traditionally uncommon in the traditional samba, and a repertoire devoted largely to romantic lyrics. Initially seen by the phonographic industry and by the media as a continuation of the pagode of the previous decade, this new wave was later characterized under the label of "pagode romântico" ("romantic pagode") – or also "pagode paulista", due to the large number of artists of this scene that emerged mainly from São Paulo state, although there were also names from Minas Gerais and Rio de Janeiro states.

This distinction was established precisely because the samba made by these new artists and musical groups – although it maintained some similarities with the standard enshrined in the Fundo de Quintal – did not have the samba musicians of the previous decade as a major musical reference nor did it keep traditional and informal aspects of matrixes of urban samba. For example, the studio recordings of a large part of these samba bands, such as Raça Negra, gave up the use of instruments common to the 1980s pagode – such as hand-repique, tan-tan and banjo – in exchange for instrumentation characteristic of international pop music from that period, especially the saxophone and the electronic keyboard. The use of these pop music instruments was less or more common to each group, (Note: "Of the samba groups that broke out at that time, they all had musical differences. Because when a group started playing, everyone already knew who that group was. Each of these groups had a sound, a characteristic.") but their purpose was the same, that is, the use of samplers and keyboards to reproduce the sound of various instruments. Despite these dilutions, the "romantic pagode" achieved great commercial success in the Brazilian phonographic market and in the mass media, highlighting samba groups such as Art Popular, Negritude Júnior, Exaltasamba, Katinguelê, Raça Negra, Só Pra Contrariar, Soweto, among others.

=== Samba in the 21st century ===
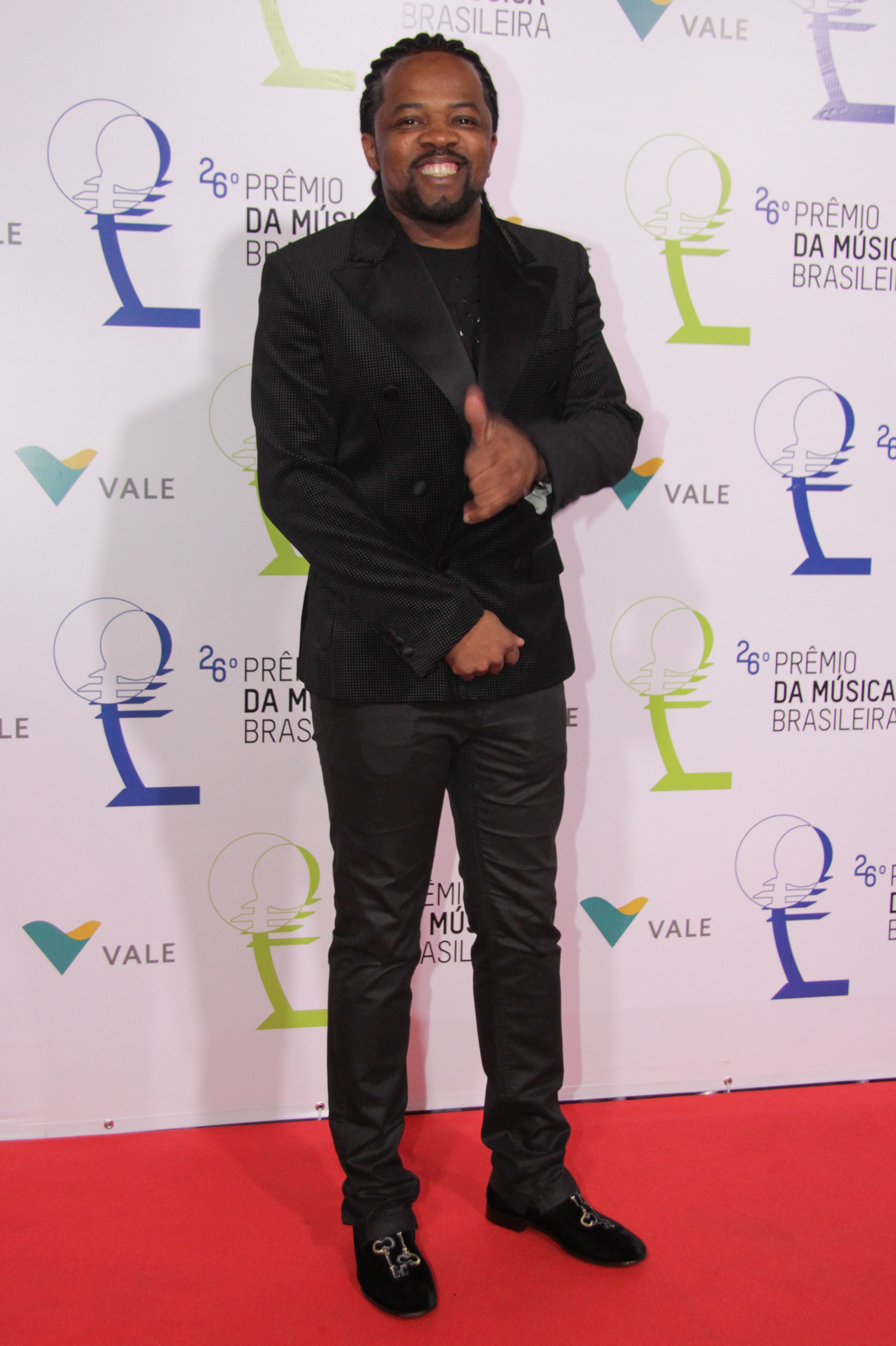
Xande de Pilares, a sambista who emerged as the Grupo Revelação singer-songwriter and leader.

During the second half of the 1990s, the increase in the illegal sale of cassette tapes and, mainly, compact discs caused a deep crisis in the music industry in Brazil, which worsened, from the 2000s, with the possibility of digital download, often free of charge, of musical works via the internet. In this context, there was a sharp drop in the commercialization of official samba records and their sub-genres, especially pagode. Samba groups of huge commercial success in the 1990s, such as Raça Negra and Só Pra Contrariar, saw their sales drop substantially at the turn of the 21st century. In addition, in a space of a few decades, samba songs played in the media have declined, with the genre it is almost always represented by the sub-genre pagode in the Brazilian charts. Of the 100 most heard artists on Brazilian radio between 2010 and 2019 on the Crowley Official Broadcast Chart, only 11 were from samba – and all from pagode. In another survey, carried out jointly between Kantar Ibope Media and Crowley Broadcast Analysis, the pagode corresponded to only 9% of the radio audience in Brazil in 2019, too far from the dominant sertanejo (Brazilian country music genre), whose slice represented about one third of the radio audience in the country.

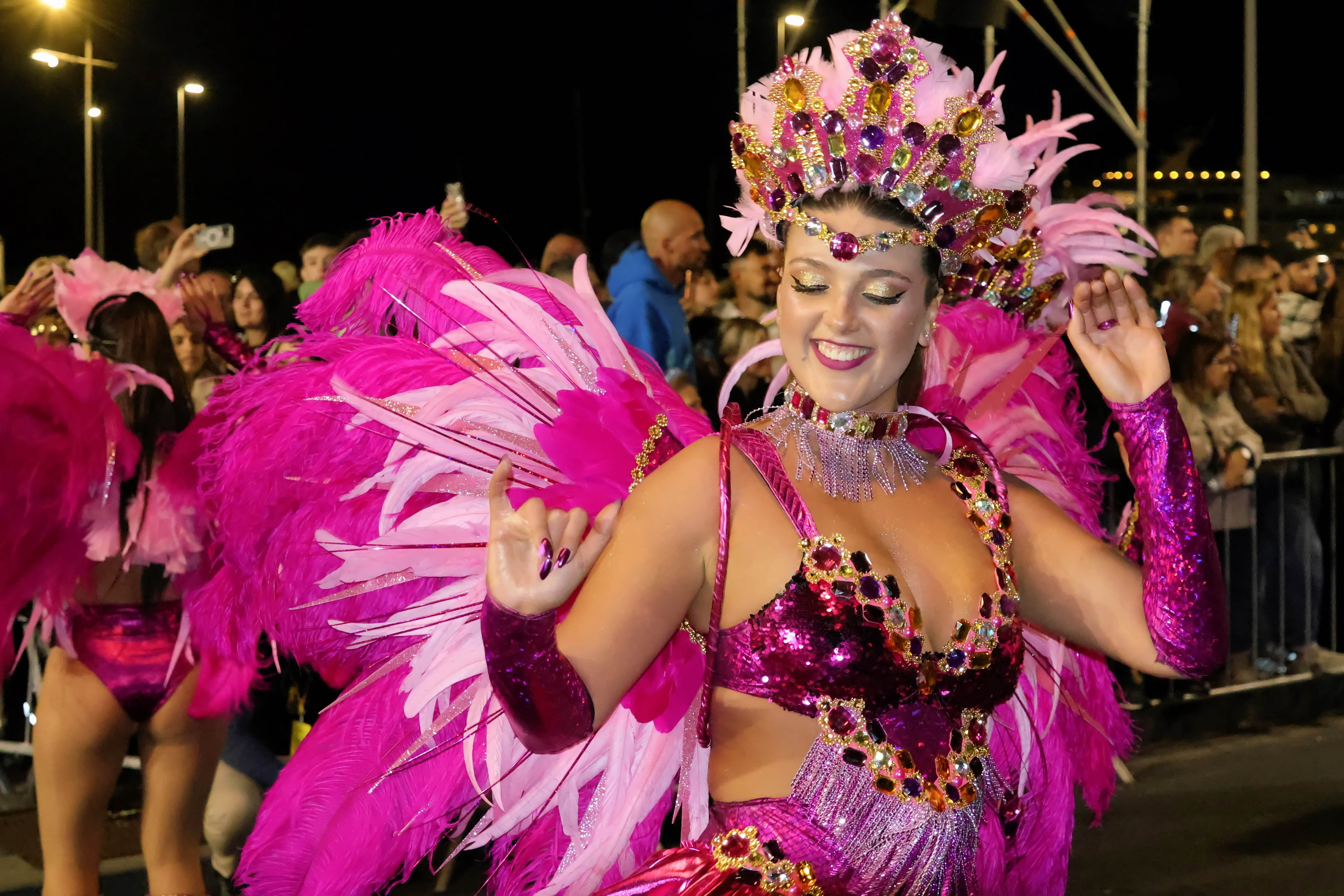
Samba female dancers

Even so, the first two decades of the 21st century confirmed the pagode as the hegemonic reference of samba in the Brazilian music industry. In the first decade of this century, new artists emerged commercially, such as the samba bands Grupo Revelação, Sorriso Maroto and Turma do Pagode, and some singers who left their original samba groups to launch a solo career, such as Péricles (former Exaltasamba), Belo (former Soweto) and Alexandre Pires (formerly of Só Pra Contrariar). In the following decade, it was the turn of Xande de Pilares and Thiaguinho, former vocalists of Revelação and Exaltasamba respectively, and of singers Mumuzinho, Ferrugem and Dilsinho. A characteristic common to all these artists was the significant amount of live album releases instead of traditional studio albums. This gained even more strength with the development of streaming media, a platform for digital music that became popular in the 2010s.

Outside the hegemonic commercial scope of the subgenre pagode, the late 1990s was also a period of great visibility and notoriety for the most traditional samba in Rio de Janeiro. A new generation of musicians emerged in "rodas de samba" that spread through several neighborhoods in the city, especially in Lapa, the central region of the city that started to concentrate several bars and restaurants with live music. For having identified with the bohemian neighborhood, this movement became known informally as "samba da Lapa". With a repertoire composed of classics sambas and without concessions to more modern sub-genres, this new circuit promoted the meeting between beginning and veteran musicians from several generations of sambistas, all identified with the traditional elements that make up the urban Carioca samba. Among some artists who acted in the scope of samba circles in this neighborhood, were Teresa Cristina and Semente group, Nilze Carvalho and Sururu na Roda group, Luciane Menezes and Dobrando a Esquina group, Eduardo Gallotti and Anjos da Lua group, among others, besides veterans such as Áurea Martins. And later, Edu Krieger and Moyseis Marques has appeared. Other new artists linked to the samba traditions, but without direct ties to the Lapa carioca movement, emerged such as Dudu Nobre and Diogo Nogueira, in addition to Fabiana Cozza in São Paulo.

In the institutional field, the Brazilian National Institute of Historic and Artistic Heritage declared in 2007 the modern Carioca samba and its matrixes samba de terreiro, partido-alto and samba-enredo as Intangible Cultural Heritage in Brazil.

== Urban samba instruments ==
With basically 2/2 rhythm and varied tempo, the urban samba is played by percussion instruments and accompanied by string instruments. In certain areas, other wind instruments were added.

Main percussion instruments of urban samba
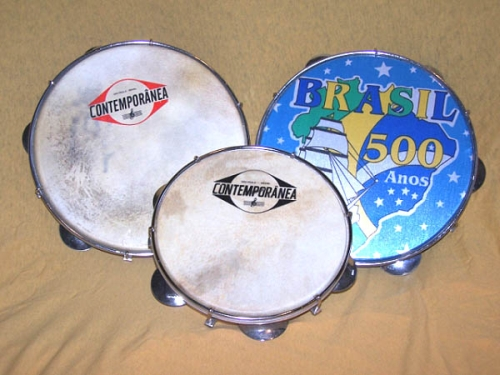
Pandeiro

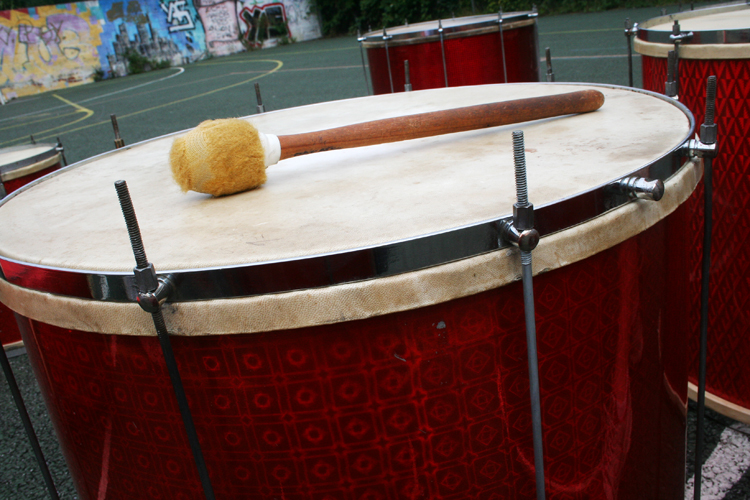
Surdo

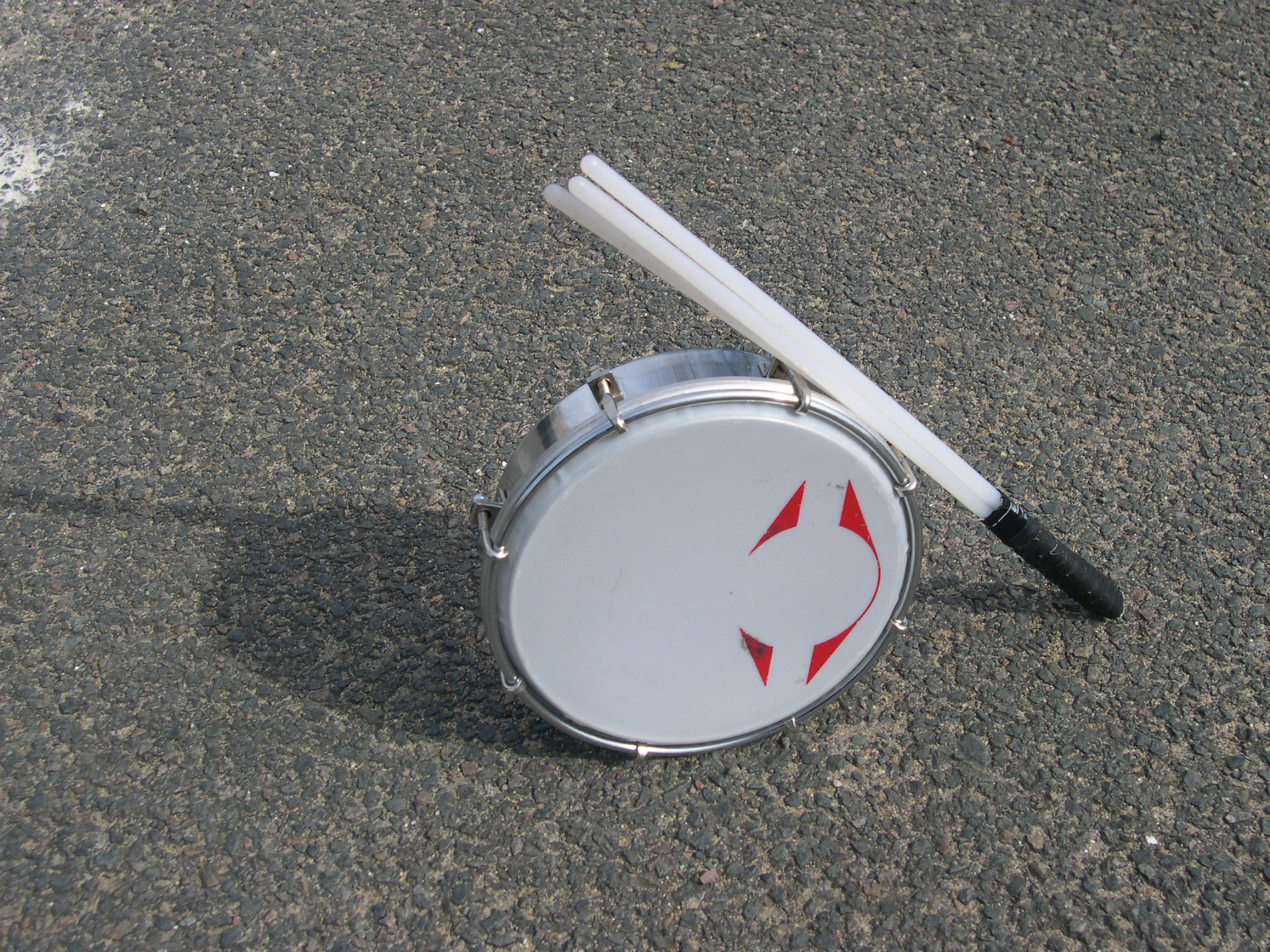
Tamborim

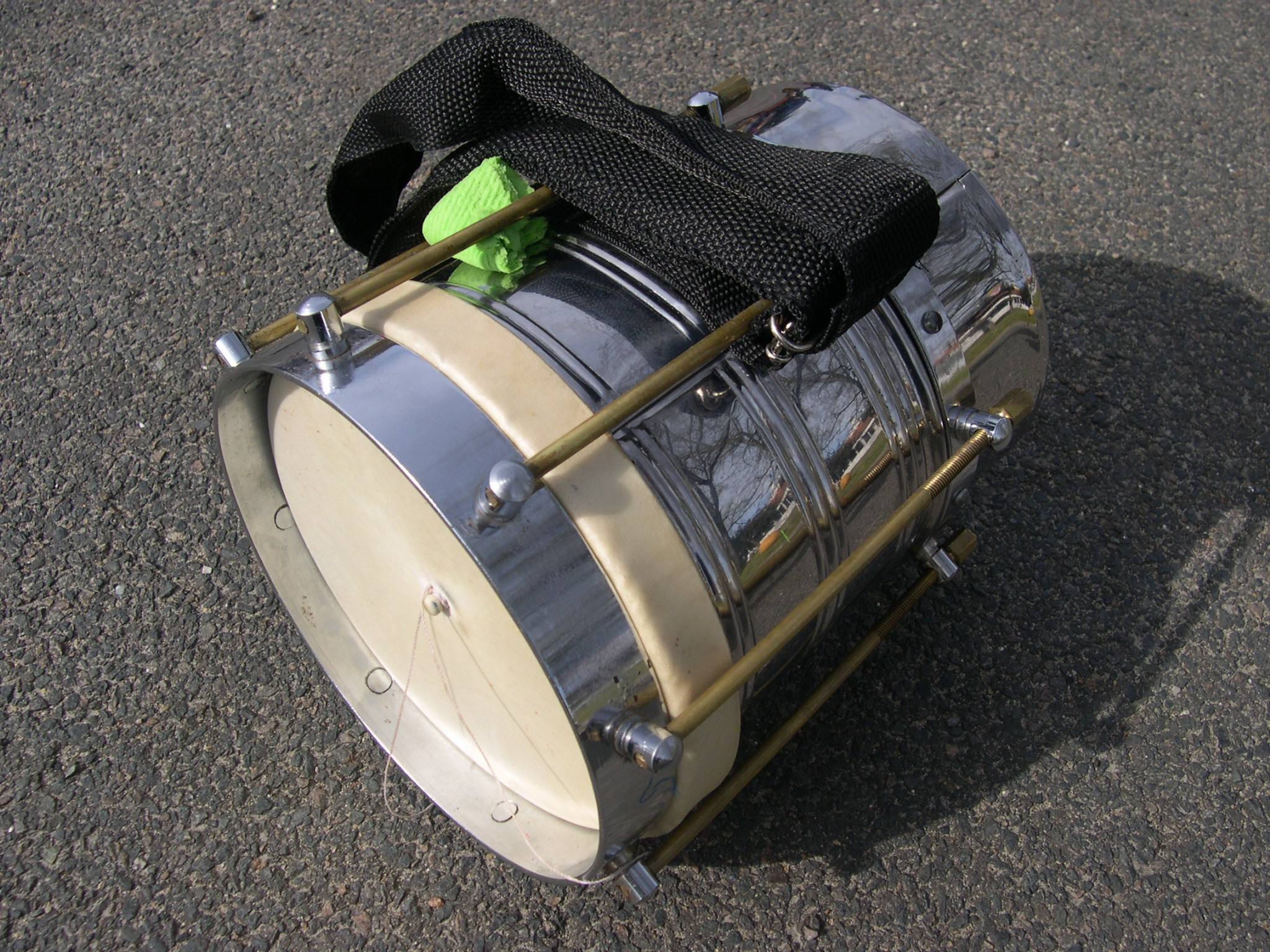
Cuíca

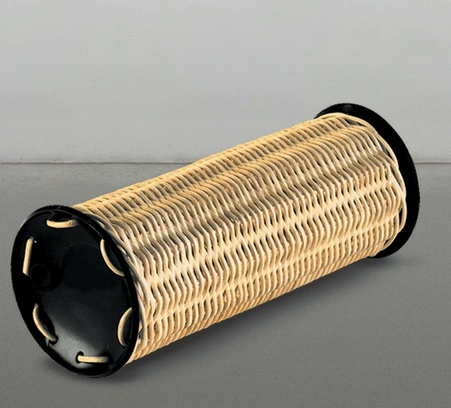
Ganzá

=== Basic instruments ===
- Tamborim (percussion)
- Surdo (percussion)
- Pandeiro (percussion)
- Ganzá (percussion)
- Cuíca (percussion)
- Repinique (percussion)
- Caixa (percussion)
- Cavaquinho
- Classical guitar

=== In some sub-genres ===
- Agogô
- Apito
- Atabaque
- Bandolim
- Banjo
- Caxixi
- Chocalho
- Hand-repique
- Reco-reco
- Tan-tan
- Brass instruments
  - Trumpet
  - Cornet
  - Trombone

== See also ==
- Music of Brazil
- Samba (Brazilian dance)
- Latin Grammy Award for Best Samba/Pagode Album
- List of Brazilian musicians#Samba
- List of English words of Niger-Congo origin
- Samba (ballroom dance)
- Samba de Gafieira
- Sambavas
