= Rádio MEC =

- Brazil
- Frequencies: 800 kHz (Rio de Janeiro); 800 kHz (Brasília)

Programming
- Language: Portuguese
- Format: Public

Ownership
- Owner: Empresa Brasil de Comunicação

History
- Founded: April 20, 1923

Links
- Website: radios.ebc.com.br/mecamrio

Rádio MEC ("MEC" is an acronym for "Música, Educação, Cultura") is a Brazilian radio station based in Rio de Janeiro, owned by Empresa Brasil de Comunicação. Founded on April 20, 1923 under the name Rádio Sociedade do Rio de Janeiro, is the first radio station in Brazil. Its programming focuses on Música Popular Brasileira (MPB), while its sister station, MEC FM, focuses on classical music and jazz.

== History ==
Rádio MEC was created in 1923 under the name Rádio Sociedade do Rio de Janeiro, by Edgar Roquette-Pinto, Henrique Charles Morize and other members of the Brazilian Academy of Sciences and society at the time. The purpose was to create an educational radio station, focusing on poetry, literature, science and classical music. In 1936, ruling out the possibility of seeking capital and becoming a communications entrepreneur, Roquette-Pinto donated the station to the Ministry of Education and Culture, however, he imposed conditions that the radio station would only broadcast educational/cultural programming and would not engage in commercial, political or religious proselytism.

The radio station remained linked to the ministry until 1995, when it came under the control of the Communications Secretariat of the Presidency of the Republic and, in 2007, with the creation of Empresa Brasil de Comunicação, the radio station became linked to it together with MEC FM and Rádio Nacional.

Many renowned Brazilian producers, musicians, writers, radio actors, poets and journalists have contributed to the radio station throughout its history, such as Cecília Meireles, Carlos Drummond de Andrade and Manuel Bandeira, Fernanda Montenegro and Fernando Torres, Sergio Viotti, Otto Maria Carpeaux, Edna Savaget, Nestor de Holanda, Francisco Mignone, Alceo Bocchino, Edino Krieger, Marlos Nobre, Carlos Eduardo Prates, Paulo Santos, among many others.

== Interval signal ==
The interval signal for Rádio MEC is a first-four notes of Brazilian traditional folk song Meu lanchinho, meu lanchinho (Based in a melody from French children's nursery rhyme Frère Jacques) which is played on piano.

== See also ==
- Empresa Brasil de Comunicação
- Rádio Nacional
