= Agência Brasil =

Brazilian public news agency

- Type: State-owned enterprise
- Industry: News agency
- Founded: May 10, 1990
- Founder: Brazilian government
- Headquarters: Brasília, Brazil
- Area served: Worldwide
- Parent: Empresa Brasil de Comunicação
- Website: www.agenciabrasil.gov.br

Agência Brasil (ABr.) is a nationwide public news agency, run by the Brazilian government. The agency was founded in 1990 and is part of public media corporation Empresa Brasil de Comunicação (EBC), created in 2007 to unite two government media enterprises Radiobrás and TVE (Televisão Educativa). It publishes under the CC-BY license.

ABr is one of the most important Brazilian news agencies, that feeds thousands of regional newspapers and websites throughout Brazil but also national media outlets like Estadão, O Globo, Folha de S.Paulo, UOL and Terra and according to its CEO, reaches more than 9 million people each month. Agência Brasil has a team dedicated in translating journalistic content to English and Spanish. The Agency also works with public news entities, such as Lusa, Xinhua and Telam to produce and carry out international information. In 2020, the agency became Reuters partner, which made the flow of international news common in the content produced by the vehicle.

Its headquarters are located in Brazilian capital, Brasília. There are also four regional offices located in Rio de Janeiro, São Luis, São Paulo and Tabatinga.

== Branding ==
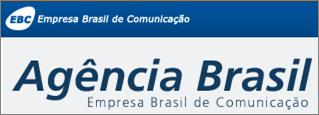
Old Agência Brasil logo

In 2019, Agência Brasil adopted a new visual identity. It was presented by Chief Minister of the General Secretariat of the Presidency, Luiz Eduardo Ramos, during a closed ceremony held at the agency's headquarters and simultaneously at its São Paulo regional office. Ramos praised the work of EBC's president during the event. According to the president of EBC, the changes were part of the institution's objectives of modernizing its services, improving efficiency, strengthening economic and financial sustainability, and enhancing public broadcasting services for the Brazilian population. Presidential spokesman Otávio Rêgo Barros was also present.

== Privatization program ==
In March 2021, the Brazilian Government included EBC in the Programa Nacional de Desestatização (National Privatization Program, in English) and has since been target of activists. National parties such as the Workers' Party (PT), the Socialism and Liberty Party (PSOL), the Communist Party of Brazil (PCdoB) and the Democratic Labour Party (PDT) presented projects, defending the constitutional right to information, a study is still to happen by the Brazilian Development Bank (BNDES). According to Roni Baksys (CEO), the company has 34 properties not being used. Eletrobras was also included in the program, at the occasion.

== Finances ==
The public company is dependent on the National Treasury and has received, by 2020, R$88.5 million (2020) (US$15.82 million), the agency also received R$389.1 million (2020) (US$69.57 million) from the Contribuição para o Fomento à Radiodifusão Pública (Contribution to the Promotion of Public Broadcasting, in English) and R$65.8 million (2020) (US$11.76 million) in own-source revenue, with expenses totaling R$543.4 million (2020) (US$97.16 million) in that year. The privatization would result in, approximately, R$400 million (2020) (US$71.52 million) in annual savings to the Union Budget.

== Analysis ==
According to an analysis by researcher Pedro Aguiar, published in 2016, Agência Brasil — like its private counterparts — does not dedicate itself to the international flow of information. According to him, the company does not broadcast news about events outside of Brazil, nor does it provide news about Brazil to foreign media, dedicating itself only to national and interregional news, making Brazil an exception in the global communications landscape. In his opinion, this contradicts the idea of making Brazil a world power.

== Partnerships ==
In 2024, Agência Brasil established a partnership with the Great Wall International Communication Center based in Hebei.
