= Renato Mismetti =

Italian-Brazilian baritone (born 1960)

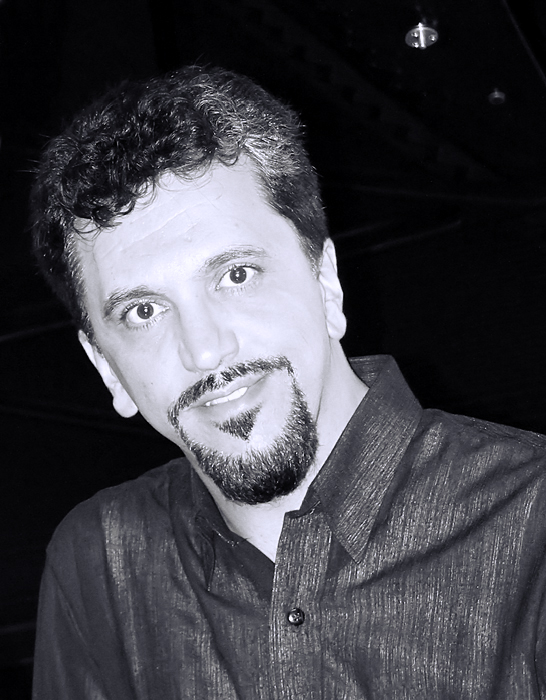

Renato Mismetti (born 1960, Cajuru, SP, Brazil) is an Italian-Brazilian baritone.

He has lived and worked in Germany since 1991. He has various attributes in stage performance: concert singer, opera singer, reciter and actor. In the theater, he played the part of Estragon in Waiting for Godot by Samuel Beckett; recited the monologue "A Terceira Margem do Rio" based on the text by João Guimarães Rosa and, as a reciter, together with the Japanese organist Aya Yoshida, presented the work "Alice au pays de l'orgue" by Jean Guillou for narrator and organ. However, his work emphasizes the interpretation of art songs.

Together with the pianist Maximiliano de Brito, Renato Mismetti has performed in the most renowned concert halls in Europe, such as Konzerthaus Berlin, Berlin State Opera, Cuvilliés Theatre, Munich, Gewandhaus, Leipzig, Alte Oper, Frankfurt, Musikhalle Hamburg, Konzerthaus Vienna, Schlosstheater Schönbrunn, Vienna, Salle Gaveau, Paris, St. John's, Smith Square, London, besides the Amazon Theatre Manaus, o Theatro da Paz, Belém and also the Weill Recital Hall at Carnegie Hall, New York. The two artists have given Master Classes interpreting Lieder, emphasizing the German Lied and Brazilian Art Songs.

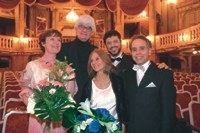
Violeta Dinescu, Marlos Nobre, Kilza Setti, Renato Mismetti, Maximiliano de Brito – Theatre at the Schönbrunn Palace in Vienna.

Renato Mismetti has worked diligently in divulging Brazilian music overseas and, because of this the press has frequently referred to him as the ambassador of Brazilian culture. He was classified as one of the supreme interpreters of Brazilian art song by the magazine New Yorker Music Review.

Mismetti's interest in working together with composers became evident early on, during his university studies when he prepared songs by Camargo Guarnieri together with the composer, who, in turn, later on watched the performance of the baritone in the title-role in his opera "Pedro Malazarte", classifying it as brilliant and saying that Renato Mismetti was the best Malazarte he had ever seen.

Various renowned composers such as Marlos Nobre, Jorge Antunes, Almeida Prado, Edino Krieger, Kilza Setti, Ronaldo Miranda, Osvaldo Lacerda, Gilberto Mendes, Ricardo Tacuchian, Violeta Dinescu and Jens Joneleit have dedicated compositions especially to this Brazilian Duo, who presented them to the world for the first time in important historical theaters such as the Markgräfliches Opernhaus in Bayreuth and the Schlosstheater New Palace (Potsdam).

In 2001, in a public letter, the Mayor of Berlin, Klaus Wowereit, publicly welcomed the two Brazilian musicians when they presented a recital at the Berlin Konzerthaus. In 2004, the Mayor of Bremen, Henning Scherf, repeated this act when the concert "Disenchanted Amazon" was presented in the Bremen Municipal Government Palace. In the German edition of Wikipedia, Renato Mismetti appears in the list of famous classical music singers.

Recently, based on the famous text by Antônio Castro Alves, "Navio Negreiro", the composer Siegrid Ernst, wrote "Memento" in which Renato Mismetti and Maximiliano de Brito, together with other musicians gave the first world performance with huge success.

Mismetti also develops great interdisciplinary projects involving various art aspects and fields. In recognition of his cultural exchange activities covering various countries, the Apollon Foundation of Bremen, Germany, was included as an associate member of UNESCO's IMC – International Music Council.
