= Raízes do Samba =

Compilation album by Cartola, etc
- Released: 1998, 1999, 2000
- Genre: bossa nova, samba, tropicália
- Label: EMI Records

Raízes do Samba is a series of compilation albums by EMI Records of notable Brazilian musicians, mostly of the bossa nova, samba and tropicalismo genres, released in the late 1990s. The musical selection was considered good by music critics, as the songs mostly represent the best of each artist. The collection stands out especially for representing the samba artist Monsueto, who at the time had little of his work recorded on CD. The cover of the albums is standardized, each artist had a photo placed over an image of the Carioca Aqueduct.

Each of the following artists have their own compilation album CD:

- Ataulfo Alves
- Gilberto Alves
- Luiz Ayrão
- Adoniran Barbosa
- Ary Barroso
- Bebeto
- Leci Brandão
- Elizeth Cardoso
- Cartola
- Beth Carvalho
- Nelson Cavaquinho
- Dorival Caymmi
- Os Cinco Crioulos
- Demônios da Garoa
- Gonzaguinha
- Almir Guineto
- Clementina de Jesus
- Dona Ivone Lara
- Nei Lopes
- J. T. Meirelles
- Carmen Miranda
- Monsueto
- Cyro Monteiro
- Wilson Moreira
- João Nogueira
- Clara Nunes
- Benito di Paula
- Pixinguinha
- Os Partideiros do Plá
- Mário Reis
- Roberto Ribeiro
- Jair Rodrigues
- Conjunto Nosso Samba
- Os Originais do Samba
- Orlando Silva
- Roberto Silva
- Moreira da Silva
- Elza Soares
- Jorge Veiga
- Paulinho da Viola
