= Samba-sincopado =

- Stylistic origins: Samba; Maxixe
- Cultural origins: Early 1910s in Rio de Janeiro, Brazil

Samba-sincopado (lit. 'syncopated samba') is a subgenre of samba that emphasises the syncopation of the musical genre. It is also sometimes referred to as samba do telecoteco.

== Etymology ==
The word syncope comes from the Greek syncopé, meaning "suppression" or "cut". In medicine, syncope indicates a momentary stop or decrease in heart rate, accompanied by suspension of breathing and temporary loss of consciousness. In grammar, syncope means the deletion of phonemes in a word. In both medicine and grammar, the term syncope suggests a change or alteration in the rhythm of the body or tongue.

In music, syncopation indicates deviations in the rhythmic pattern in which the sound—articulated in the weak part of the beat or bar—continues in the strong part of the next beat. It indicates the writing of a weak beat of a bar, prolonged by another beat of greater or equal duration. Modern urban samba, which emerged in Rio de Janeiro in the 1910s, was closely linked to the maxixe. At the end of the 1920s, samba underwent major rhythmic transformations, changing the way it was played, sung and danced compared with the first generation of samba players—such as Sinhô, Donga and João da Baiana. Doing away with the old samba amaxixado, this new form of samba had a more syncopated cadence and was supported more by percussion. Samba itself became syncopated, but in samba-sincopado, syncopation (displacement) was pushed to its ultimate consequences.

== Style ==
Samba-sincopado is a type of samba closely related to samba-choro, as both emphasize musical virtuosity, with elaborate melodies and broken rhythms. This is known as syncopated samba, for example, with its sinuous phrasing, rich in notes and distinctly chambered, with zigzag rhythmic divisions.

In terms of themes and linguistic inflection, it is generally close to the samba de breque, which results from the exacerbation of ginga and humour, with humorous lyrics and abrupt stops in which the singer introduces spoken comments related to the theme being sung. The samba de gafieira is also an example of syncopated samba, a musical subgenre that is more dance-oriented.

Brazilian composer Geraldo Pereira was a leading exponent of syncopated samba. Nei Lopes says that Geraldo Pereira's compositions are syncopated: Bolinha de Papel, Escurinha, Escurinho, Falsa Baiana.

It was widely played commercially, but was also closely associated with the roda de samba (and even the roda de choro, which was exclusively instrumental). Syncopated samba was to have a major influence on bossa nova musicians.

== Bibliography ==
- Barbosa, Flávio (2009). Palavra de bamba: estudo léxico-discursivo de pioneiros do samba urbano carioca (PDF) (in Portuguese). Rio de Janeiro: UFRJ.
- Barcelos, Tânia Maia (2006). Re-quebros da subjetividade e o poder transformador do samba (PDF) (thèse de doctorat) (in Portuguese). São Paulo: PUC.
- Marcondes, Marcos Antônio (1998). Enciclopédia da música brasileira: erudita, folclórica e popular (in Portuguese). São Paulo: Arte Editora/Itaú Cultural/Publifolha. ISBN 85-7161-031-2.
- Lopes, Nei (2003). Sambeabá: O samba que não se aprende na escola (in Portuguese). Rio de Janeiro: Casa da Palavra.
- Lopes, Nei (2004). Enciclopédia brasileira da diáspora africana (in Portuguese). São Paulo: Summus Editorial/Selo Negro. p. 623.
- Sandroni, Carlos (2001). Transformação do Samba Carioca no Século XX (in Portuguese). Rio de Janeiro: Jorge Zahar.
