= Schlosstheater Schönbrunn =

Stage at the Schönbrunn Palace in Vienna

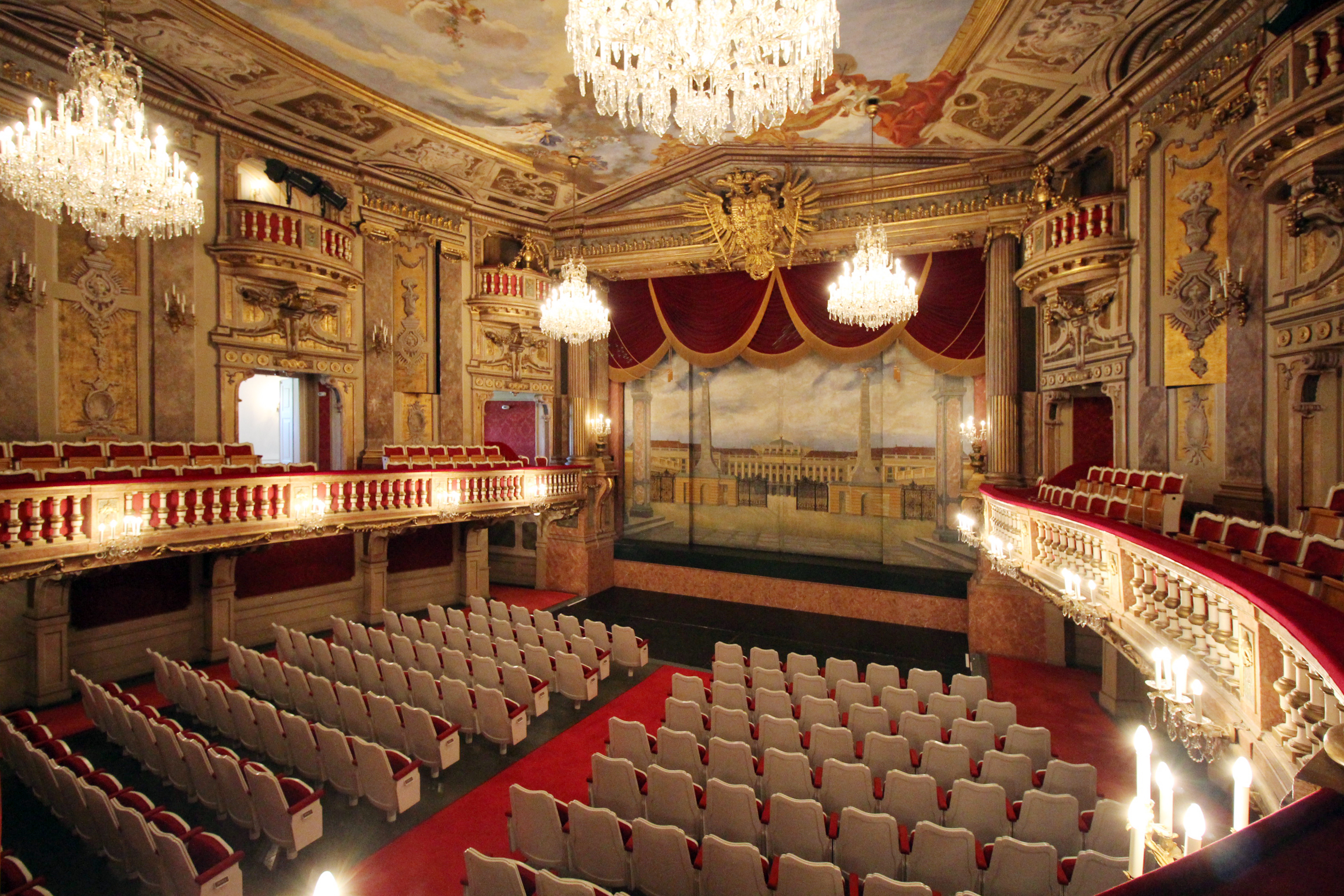
- Interior of the palace theatre
- Interactive map of Schlosstheater Schönbrunn
- Address: Vienna; Austria
- Coordinates: 48°11′12″N 16°18′45″E

Construction
- Opened: 1747
- Reopened: 1809
- Architect: Nicolò Pacassi

Website
- Official website

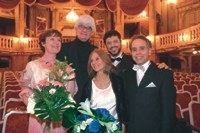
After a performance with (from left) Violeta Dinescu, Marlos Nobre, Kilza Setti, Renato Mismetti and pianist Maximiliano de Brito

Schlosstheater Schönbrunn (Schönbrunn Palace Theatre) is a stage at Schönbrunn Palace in Vienna which opened in 1747. The Baroque theatre now serves for the training of students of acting and opera of the University of Music and Performing Arts Vienna (MDW), and for performances of the Musik Theater Schönbrunn.

== History ==
In the 17th century, theatrical performances were held occasionally at the park of Schloss Schönbrunn. Maria Theresa commissioned Nicolò Pacassi in 1745 to build an imperial theatre in a wing of the palace, as one of the first palace theatres in Europe. It was opened on 4 October 1747, the name day of her husband, Francis I, Holy Roman Emperor.

The empress, who appeared in opera and theatre, watched her children perform in tableaux vivants. The theatre first served the Habsburg court exclusively. Members of the Court Opera performed at the theatre. Operas by Christoph Willibald Gluck premiered there, L'arbre enchanté in 1759, and Il Parnaso confuso in 1765. Joseph Haydn conducted performances of the Esterhazy orchestra in 1777.

When Napoleon Bonaparte had his headquarters in Schönbrunn, he renovated the theatre. It was reopened in 1809 with Jean Racine's Phèdre. Singers of the Theater am Kärntnertor appeared for emperors and kings during the Congress of Vienna. Under Ferdinand I of Austria, the theatre flourished again, with plays performed by the ensemble of the Burgtheater. In 1898, the palace and theatre were electrified.

Before World War I, the building was used as storage for furniture, but after the imperial belongings were stolen in 1919, plays were again performed during the summer by the Burgtheater, directed by Albert Heine, until 1924. In 1929, the Schlosstheater was given to the Max Reinhardt Seminar as a rehearsal stage, which has used it, together with the opera department of the Universität für Musik und darstellende Kunst, from October to June.

The building underwent major restoration in 1979/80.

== Literature ==
- Ernst Moriz Kronfeld: Das Schönbrunner Schloßtheater. Erster Teil: Von Maria Theresia bis zur Franzosenzeit. In: Hans Devrient (ed.): Archiv für Theatergeschichte, Vol. I, Fleischel, Berlin 1904, pp. 43–62.
  - —: —. Zweiter Teil: Vorstellungen vor Napoleon In: Hans Devrient (ed.): Archiv für Theatergeschichte, Vol. II, Fleischel, Berlin 1905, pp. 169–192
- Dagobert Frey, Franz Herterich, Karl Kobald, Direktion des Burgtheaters in Wien (ed.): Das Schönbrunner Schlosstheater. Theater und Kultur, Vol. 11, ZDB-ID 2061067-1. Amalthea, Vienna 1924, OBV.
- Oscar Deléglise (ed.): Das Schönbrunner Schloßtheater. Bauer, Vienna 1947, OBV.
- Kunsträume. December 2009. (Schlosstheater Schönbrunn). Universität für Musik und darstellende Kunst Wien, Vienna 2009.
