= FM broadcast band =

Radio broadcast band

Graphical depiction of FM broadcasting allotments.

The FM broadcast band is a range of radio frequencies used for FM broadcasting by radio stations. The range of frequencies used differs between different parts of the world. In Europe and Africa (defined as International Telecommunication Union (ITU) region 1) and in Australia and New Zealand, it spans from 87.5 to 108 megahertz (MHz) - also known as VHF Band II - while in the Americas (ITU region 2) it ranges from 88 to 108 MHz. The FM broadcast band in Japan uses 76 to 95 MHz, and in Brazil, 76 to 108 MHz. The International Radio and Television Organisation (OIRT) band in Eastern Europe is from 65.9 to 74.0 MHz, although these countries now primarily use the 87.5 to 108 MHz band, as in the case of Russia. Some other countries have already discontinued the OIRT band and have changed to the 87.5 to 108 MHz band.

Narrow band frequency modulation was developed and demonstrated by Hanso Idzerda in 1919.

Wide band frequency modulation radio originated in the United States during the 1930s; the system was developed by the American electrical engineer Edwin Howard Armstrong. However, FM broadcasting did not become widespread, even in North America, until the 1960s.

Frequency-modulated radio waves can be generated at any frequency. All the bands mentioned in this article are in the very high frequency (VHF) range, which extends from 30 to 300 MHz.

== CCIR bandplan ==
=== Center frequencies ===
Most countries use centre frequencies with multiples of 100kHz (98,1, 98.2 etc.). Some countries such as the USA only use the odd multiples of these (98.1, 98.3 etc.) and a few use just the even multiples. Even fewer countries (such as Italy) use 50kHz multiples.

An ITU conference in Geneva, Switzerland, on December 7, 1984, resolved to discontinue the use of 50 kHz channel spacings throughout Europe.

- Most countries have used 100 kHz or 200 kHz channel spacings for FM broadcasting since this ITU conference in 1984.
- Some digitally-tuned FM radios are unable to tune using 50 kHz or even 100 kHz increments. Therefore, when traveling abroad or importing receivers, stations that broadcast on certain frequencies using such increments may not be heard clearly. This problem will not affect reception on an analog-tuned radio.
- A few countries, such as Italy, which have heavily congested FM bands, still allow a station on any multiple of 50 kHz wherever one can be squeezed in.
- The 50 kHz channel spacings can reduce adjacent-channel interference, and these take advantage of FM's capture effect and receiver selectivity.

=== ITU Region 2 bandplan and channel numbering ===
The original frequency allocation in North America used by Edwin Armstrong used the frequency band from 42 through 50 MHz, but this allocation was changed to a higher band beginning in 1945. In Canada, the United States, Mexico, the Bahamas, etc., there are 101 FM channels numbered from 200 (center frequency 87.9 MHz) to 300 (center frequency 107.9 MHz), though these numbers are rarely used outside the fields of radio engineering and government.

The center frequencies of the FM channels are spaced in increments of 200 kHz. The frequency of 87.9 MHz, while technically part of TV channel 6 (82 to 88 MHz), is used by just two FM class-D stations in the United States. Portable radio tuners often tune down to 87.5 MHz, so that the same radios can be made and sold worldwide. Automobiles usually have FM radios that can tune down to 87.7 MHz, so that TV channel 6's audio at 87.75 MHz (±10 kHz) could be received while driving. This is largely no longer possible due to the 2009 digital television transition, though in 2023, the FCC authorized 14 low-powered Channel 6 television stations to continue to operate radio services indefinitely.

In the United States, the 21 channels with center frequencies of 87.9–91.9 MHz (channels 200 through 220) constitute the reserved band, exclusively for non-commercial educational (NCE) stations. The other channels (92.1 MHz through 107.9 MHz (Channels 221–300) may be used by both commercial and non-commercial stations. (Note that in Canada and in Mexico, this reservation does not apply; Mexico introduced a reservation of 106.1–107.9 MHz for community and indigenous stations in 2014, though dozens of stations are grandfathered due to lack of space to relocate them.)

Originally, the American Federal Communications Commission (FCC) devised a bandplan in which FM radio stations would be assigned at intervals of four channels (800 kHz separation) for any one geographic area. Thus, in one area, stations might be at 88.1, 88.9, 89.7, etc., while in an adjacent area, stations might be at 88.3, 89.1, 89.9, 90.7 etc. Certain frequencies were designated for Class A only (see FM broadcasting), which had a limit of 3 kilowatts of effective radiated power (ERP) and an antenna height limit for the center of radiation of 300 feet (91.4 m) height above average terrain (HAAT). These frequencies were 92.1, 92.7, 93.5, 94.3, 95.3, 95.9, 96.7, 97.7, 98.3, 99.3, 100.1, 100.9, 101.7, 102.3, 103.1, 103.9, 104.9, 105.5, 106.3 and 107.1. On other frequencies, a station could be Class B (50 kW, 500 feet) or Class C (100 kW, 2,000 feet), depending on which zone it was in.

In the late 1980s, the FCC switched to a bandplan based on a distance separation table using currently operating stations, and subdivided the class table to create extra classes and change antenna height limits to meters. Class A power was doubled to six kilowatts, and the frequency restrictions noted above were removed. As of late 2004, some stations can be "squeezed in" anywhere as long as the location and class conform to the rules in the FCC separation table. The rules for second-adjacent-channel spacing do not apply for stations licensed before 1964.

In 2017, Brazil laid the groundwork to reclaim channels 5 and 6 (76.1–87.5 MHz) for sound broadcasting use and required new radio receivers to be able to tune into the new extended band (Portuguese: faixa estendida, abbreviated eFM). Five transmitters of public broadcaster Brazil Communication Company were the first extended-band stations to begin broadcasts on May 7, 2021.

In 2023, Chile announced the expansion of the FM band to 76-108 MHz as part of the analog TV shutdown, scheduled for April 2024.

=== Deviation and bandpass ===
Normally each channel is 200 kHz (0.2 MHz) wide, and can pass audio and subcarrier frequencies up to 100 kHz. Deviation is typically limited to 150 kHz total (±75 kHz) in order to prevent adjacent-channel interference on the band. Stations in the U.S. may go up to 10% over this limit if they use non-stereo subcarriers, increasing total modulation by 0.5% for each 1% used by the subcarriers. Some stations may be limited to (±50 kHz) deviation in order to reduce transmitted bandwidth so that additional stations can be squeezed in. Note that the bandwidth of a FM signal is not simply a function of the deviation but is also dependent on the modulated frequencies as defined by Carson's bandwidth rule.

== OIRT bandplan ==
The OIRT FM broadcast band covers 65.8 to 74 MHz. It was used in the Soviet Union and most of the other Warsaw Pact member countries of the International Radio and Television Organisation in Eastern Europe (OIRT), with the exception of East Germany, which always used the 87.5 to 100 (later 104) MHz broadcast band—in line with Western Europe.

The lower portion of the VHF band behaves a bit like shortwave radio in that it has a longer reach than the upper portion of the VHF band. It was ideally suited for reaching vast and remote areas that would otherwise lack FM radio reception. In a way, FM suited this band because the capture effect of FM could mitigate interference from skywaves.

Transition to the 87.5 to 108 MHz band started as early as the 1980s in some East European countries. Following the collapse of the communist governments, that transition was remarkably accelerated as private stations have been established. This was also prompted by the lack of equipment for the OIRT band and the modernization of existing transmission networks.

Many countries have completely ceased broadcasting on the OIRT FM band, although use continues in others, mainly the former republics of the USSR. The future of broadcasting on the OIRT FM band is limited, due to the lack of new consumer receivers for this band outside of Russia.

Countries which still use the OIRT band (as of 2026) are Russia (28 regions, including Radio Shanson 72,11 UKV in Kaliningrad), Belarus (Belteleradio), Ukraine (Ukrainian Radio, Radio Promin, Radio Kultura, Best FM, Radio Maria Ukraine and Radio Emmanuil), Radio Micul Samaritean 68,93 UKV in Hîncești (Moldova) and Public Radio of Armenia 69,80 UKV in Yerevan

In Czechoslovakia, the decision to use the 87.5 to 108 MHz band instead of 65.9 to 74 MHz band was made in the beginning of the 80s. The frequency plan was created, which was internationally coordinated at the 1984 Regional Administrative Conference for FM Sound Broadcasting in the VHF band in Geneva. Allocated frequencies are still valid and are used in the Czech Republic and Slovakia. The first transmitter was put into operation on 102.5 MHz near Prague in November 1984. Three years later, there were 11 transmitters in service across the country, including three in the Prague neighborhood of Žižkov. In 1988, the plan was to set up 270 transmitters in 45 locations eventually. The transition was finished in 1993.

In Poland all OIRT broadcast transmitters were closed down at the end of 1999.

Hungary closed down its remaining broadcast transmitters in 2007, and for 30 days in July of that year, several Hungarian amateur radio operators received a temporary experimental permit to perform propagation and interference experiments in the 70–70.5 MHz band. Until the closure of the OIRT FM network, a separate version of Kossuth Rádió with parliamentary proceedings was carried.

In Belarus, only government-run public radio stations are still active on OIRT. All stations on OIRT in Belarus are a mirror of normal FM broadcasts. The main purpose of those stations is compatibility with older equipment.

In 2014, Russia began replacing OIRT-banded transmitter with CCIR-banded (the "western") FM transmitters. The main reason for the change to CCIR FM is to reach more listeners.

Unlike Western practice, OIRT FM frequencies are based on 30 kHz rather than 50, 100, or 200 kHz multiples. This may have been to reduce co-channel interference caused by Sporadic E propagation and other atmospheric effects, which occur more often at these frequencies. However, multipath distortion effects are less annoying than on the CCIR band.

Stereo is generally achieved by sending the stereo difference signal, using a process called polar modulation. Polar modulation uses a reduced subcarrier on 31.25 kHz with the audio on both side-bands. This gives the following signal structure: L + R --> 31.25 kHz reduced subcarrier L - R.

The 4-meter band (70–70.5 MHz) amateur radio allocation used in many European countries is entirely within the OIRT FM band. Operators on this band and the 6-meter band (50–54 MHz) use the presence of broadcast stations as an indication that there is an "opening" into Eastern Europe or Russia. This can be a mixed blessing because the 4 meter amateur allocation is only 0.5 MHz or less, and a single broadcast station causes considerable interference to a large part of the band.

The System D television channels R4 and R5 lie wholly or partly within the 87.5–108 MHz FM audio broadcast band. Countries which still use System D therefore have to consider the re-organization of TV broadcasting in order to make full use of this band for audio broadcasting.

== Japanese bandplan ==
The FM band in Japan is 76–95 MHz, extended from 76–90 MHz following the analog television shutdown on July 24, 2011, with the 90–108 MHz section formerly used for analog VHF TV Channels 1, 2, and 3 (each NTSC television channel was 6 MHz wide). Prior to the band extension, the narrowness of the Japanese band (14 MHz compared to slightly more than 20 MHz for the CCIR band) limited the number of FM stations that could be accommodated on the dial with the result that many commercial radio stations were forced to use AM.

In late 2013, the Ministry of Internal Affairs and Communications published a report proposing the expansion of the FM band to 95 MHz; at the time, the Japanese FM band was from 76-90 MHz. Many stations that had been previously only available on the AM band were issued preliminary licenses to broadcast from 90-95 MHz. The first station to go on air in the expanded band was Nankai Broadcasting, which began test broadcasts on 91.7 FM on November 3, 2014.

Many Japanese radios are capable of receiving both the Japanese FM band and the CCIR FM band, so that the same model can be sold within Japan or exported. The radio may cover 76 to 108 MHz, the frequency coverage may be selectable by the user, or during assembly the radio may be set to operate on one band by means of a specially placed diode or other internal component.

Conventional analog-tuned (dial & pointer) radios were formerly marked with "TV Sound" in the 76–88 section. If these radios were sold in the US, for example, the 76–88 section would be marked TV sound for VHF channels 5 and 6 (as two 6 MHz-wide NTSC TV channels), with the 88–108 section band as normal FM. The compatibility of "TV sound" with conventional FM radio ended with the U.S. digital TV transition in 2009, with the exception of the limited number of low-power stations on channel 6 that still use analog.

Second-hand automobiles imported from Japan contain a radio designed for the Japanese FM band, and importers often fit a band expander to down-convert the 87.5-108.0 MHz band to the frequencies that the radio can accept. In addition to showing an incorrect frequency, there are two other disadvantages that can result in undesired performance; the converter cannot down-convert in full the regular international FM band (up to 20.5 MHz wide) to the only 14 MHz wide Japanese band (unless the converter incorporates two user-switchable down-convert modes), and the original antenna may perform poorly on the higher FM band. Another problem is that RDS is not used in Japan, whereas most modern car radios available in Europe use this system, and the converter may not allow pass-through of the MW band.

Australia had a similar situation with Australian TV channels 3, 4, and 5 that are between 88 and 108 MHz, and was intending to follow Japan. In the end Australia opted for the CCIR bandplan because of the radios that were already imported into the country. There were some radios sold in Australia for 76 to 90 MHz.

== Historic U.S. bandplan ==
In the 1930s, investigations were begun into establishing radio stations transmitting on "Very High Frequency" (VHF) assignments above 30 MHz. In October 1937, the Federal Communications Commission (FCC) announced new frequency allocations, which included a band of experimental and educational "Apex" stations, that consisted of 75 channels spanning from 41.02 to 43.98 MHz. Like the existing AM band these stations employed amplitude modulation, however the 40 kHz spacing between adjacent frequencies was four times as much as the 10 kHz spacing on the standard AM broadcast band, which reduced adjacent-frequency interference, and provided more bandwidth for high-fidelity programming.

Also during the 1930s, Edwin Howard Armstrong developed a competing transmission technology, "wide-band frequency modulation", which was promoted as being superior to AM transmissions, in particular due to its high-fidelity and near immunity to static interference. In May 1940, largely as the result of Armstrong's efforts, the FCC decided to eliminate the Apex band, and authorized an FM band effective January 1, 1941, operating on 40 channels spanning 42–50 MHz, with the first five channels reserved for educational stations. There was significant interest in the new FM band by station owners, however, construction restrictions that went into place during World War II limited the growth of the new service.

Following the end of the war, the FCC moved to standardize its frequency allocations. One area of concern was the effects of tropospheric and Sporadic E propagation, which at times reflected station signals over great distances, causing mutual interference. A particularly controversial proposal, spearheaded by the Radio Corporation Of America (RCA), which was headed by David Sarnoff, was that the FM band needed to be shifted to higher frequencies in order to avoid this potential problem. Armstrong charged that this reassignment had the covert goal of disrupting FM radio development, however RCA's proposal prevailed, and on June 27, 1945, the FCC announced the reassignment of the FM band to 90 channels from 88–106 MHz, which was soon expanded to 100 channels from 88–108 MHz, with the first 20 channels reserved for educational stations. A period of allowing existing FM stations to broadcast on both the original "low" and new "high" FM bands followed, which ended at midnight on January 8, 1949, at which time all low band transmissions had to end.

In 1978, one additional frequency reserved for educational stations, 87.9 MHz, was allocated. In March 2008, the FCC requested public comment on turning the bandwidth currently occupied by analog television channels 5 and 6 (76–88 MHz) over to extending the FM broadcast band when the digital television transition was to be completed in February 2009 (ultimately delayed to June 2009). This proposed allocation would have effectively assigned frequencies corresponding to the existing Japanese FM radio service (which begins at 76 MHz) for use as an extension to the existing North American FM broadcast band. Several low-power television stations colloquially known as "Franken-FMs" operated primarily as radio stations on channel 6, using the 87.7 MHz audio carrier of that channel as a radio station receivable on most FM receivers configured to cover the whole of Band II, from 2009 to 2021; since then, a reduced number have received special temporary authority to carry a special audio carrier on their ATSC 3.0 signals to continue the status quo.

== FM radio switch-off ==
With the gradual adoption of digital radio broadcasting (e.g. HD Radio, DAB+) radio, some countries have planned and started an FM radio switch-off. Norway, in January 2018, was the first country to discontinue FM as a result.

== See also ==
- FM broadcasting
- Frequency modulation
