= Alexandre Parola =

Alexandere Parola, a Brazilian Diplomat

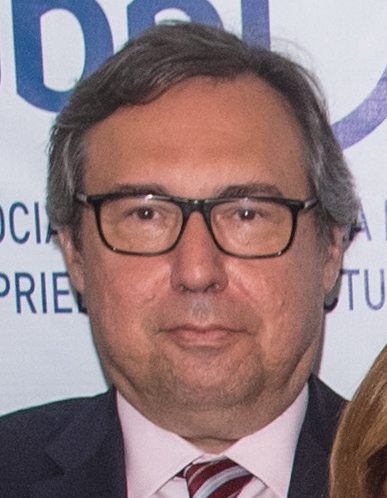
- Parola in 2022

Diplomat Mission of Brazil Trade Representative
- Incumbent
- Assumed office January 2019

Personal details
- Born: 1965 (age 60–61) Rio de Janeiro

Alexandre Parola (born 1965, Rio de Janeiro) is a Brazilian diplomat, currently serving as permanent representative of the Mission of Brazil to the World Trade Organization (WTO) and other economic organizations in Geneva. Parola previously served as the spokesman of the presidency (Brazil), or press secretary, under Michel Temer presidency. In April 2018, president Michel Temer nominated Parola for the post of trade representative and chief of the mission in Geneva. He also served briefly as the president of Empresa Brasil de Comunicação (EBC), from May 2018 to October 2018.
