= Adoniran Barbosa =

Brazilian singer and composer

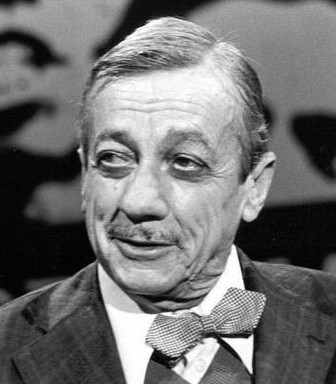
- Born: João Rubinato; 6 August 1910; Valinhos, São Paulo, Brazil
- Died: 23 November 1982 (aged 72); São Paulo, São Paulo, Brazil
- Musical career
- Genres: Samba
- Instruments: Vocals
- Years active: 1935–1977

Adoniran Barbosa, artistic name of João Rubinato (6 August 1910 – 23 November 1982), was a noted Brazilian São Paulo style samba singer and composer.

== Biography ==
=== Early years ===
João (John) Rubinato was the seventh child of Francesco (Francis) Rubinato and Emma Ricchini, Italian immigrants from Cavarzere (province of Venice). His parents had settled in Valinhos, a rural town in the state of São Paulo, about 70 km from the city of São Paulo. In 2010, two bridges were named after Rubinato: one located in Valinhos, Brazil, where the singer was born, and another in Cavarzere, Italy, where his parents came from.

He is said to have been a rather reluctant student, and started working at an early age (which required falsifying his birth date). His first job was a sweeper boy and general helper at a railway company in the nearby town of Jundiaí. In 1924 he moved to Santo André, a town in the Greater São Paulo area, where he went through many jobs — loom operator, painter, plumber, iron worker, peddler and waiter. At a local technical school (the Liceu de Artes e Ofícios) he learned the office of mechanical assistant.

=== Debut as composer and singer ===
In 1933 João Rubinato moved to the city of São Paulo, where he started composing songs and tried his luck as a singer in Cruzeiro do Sul radio station, in a talent-scouting show directed by Jorge Amaral. After many failures, he finally succeeded with the Noel Rosa's samba Filosofia, and got a contract for a weekly 15-minute show.

Fearful that a samba artist with an Italian surname would not be taken seriously by the public, João Rubinato then decided to adopt a more Brazilian-sounding name. So he borrowed the unusual "Adoniran" from one of his friends, and "Barbosa" from samba composer Luiz Barbosa, his idol.

In 1935 he won a Carnaval song contest sponsored by the city of São Paulo, with the samba Dona Boa, composed together with J. Aimberê. Spirited by that success, he married his longtime girlfriend Olga. The couple had a daughter, Maria Helena, but the marriage broke up in less than one year.

=== At the Rádio Record ===
In 1941 he started performing comedy in the radio theater programs of the São Paulo radio station Rádio Record, — which would later become one of the top television and radio networks of Brazil — Rede Record. He remained with that network until his retirement in 1972; giving his voice to various popular characters created together with writer Osvaldo Moles, like: Pernafina, Zé Cunversa, and Jean Rubinet (a parody of a French movie star). He also played parts in the movies: Pif-Paf (1945) and Caídos do Céu ("Fallen from Heaven") (1946), both directed by Ademar Gonzaga. In 1949 he married Matilde de Lutiis, who would be his companion and co-author for the next 50 years.

In 1953 he made a fine performance in the movie O Cangaceiro, by director Lima Barreto. In the early 1950s he wrote many songs on typical São Paulo themes, most of them recorded by the band Demônios da Garoa, and won two other São Paulo Carnaval contests. In 1955 he introduced the enormously popular character Charutinho ("Short Cigar") in the radio humor show Histórias das Malocas ("Shantytown Stories").

Adoniran also acted in some of the earliest Brazilian soap operas (telenovelas), such as A Pensão de D. Isaura ("Ms. Isaura's Boarding Home"), and comic programs like Ceará contra 007 ("Ceará against 007") and Papai Sabe Nada ("Daddy Knows Nothing").

=== Later years and legacy ===
In spite of the success of his songs and radio characters, Adoniran only became a star of sorts after 1973 when he recorded his first own album. That made him respected as a major composer, and gave him some media exposure. Nevertheless, through his career he continued living a simple and happy life. He had earned a private table at the Bar Brahma, one of the city's most traditional bars.

While he never lost his love of São Paulo, towards the end of his life he became increasingly sad about the disappearance of its traditional character. "Until the 1960s," he once said, "São Paulo still existed, but since then I have been looking for it, and could not find it. Brás, where is Brás now? And Bexiga, where is it? I was told to look for the Sé. Could not find it. All I see is cars and concrete."

While his music continued to be played, Adoniran himself was gradually forgotten by the public; so that when he died in 1982, in relative poverty, he had at his side only his wife and a brother-in-law. However, almost 30 years after his death he is still remembered by popular Brazilian singers like Perci Guzzo, who occasionally performs his songs in tribute.

On 6 August 2016, Google Doodle commemorated his 105th birthday.

Adoniran Barbosa was portrayed by Paulo Miklos in the 2023 Brazilian feature film Saudosa Maloca.

== Homages ==
Besides the Museu Adoniran Barbosa (at Rua XV de Novembro, 347), there are many mementos of the composer scattered through São Paulo. He gave his name to a school in Itaquera, to a street in the borough of Bexiga, to a Bar Adoniran Barbosa, and to a square. In the Don Orione Square there is a bust of the artist, and in Jaçanã there is a street called "Rua Trem das Onze (11 PM Train Street)".

== Musical production ==
=== Themes ===
Adoniran Barbosa made good on the hardships of his youth by becoming the composer of the lower classes of São Paulo, particularly the poor Italian immigrants living in the quarters of Bexiga (Bela Vista) and Brás, and the poor who lived in the city's many malocas (the shanties of favelas) and cortiços (degraded multifamily row houses).

The themes of his songs are drawn from the life of low-wage urban workers, the unemployed and the vagabonds. His first big hit was Saudosa Maloca ("Shanty of Fond Memories", 1951), where three homeless friends recall with nostalgia their improvised shanty, which was torn down by the landowner to make room for a building. His next success Joga a Chave ("Throw me the Doorkey", 1952) was inspired on his own frequent experiences of arriving late at home and finding the door locked by his wife, Matilde. In his Trem das Onze ("The 11 pm Train", 1964), which has been ranked one of the five best samba songs ever, the protagonist explains to his lover that he cannot stay any longer because he has to catch the last train to the Jaçanã suburb, and besides his mother will not sleep before he arrives.

=== Adoniran's language ===
Unlike the samba songs of the previous decades, which generally used the formal Portuguese of the educated class, Adoniran's lyrics are a realistic record of the informal speech of São Paulo's lower classes. He once said "I only write samba for the common people. That is why I write lyrics in 'wrong' Portuguese, because that is how the common people speak. Besides, I feel that samba is more beautiful when sung that way". The homeless narrator of his Saudosa Maloca, for example, tells of the day when his shanty was torn down by the landowner:

| Peguemo todas nossas coisa, | "We picked up all our belongings |
| E fumo pro meio da rua | And we went out on the street |
| Apreciá a demolição. | To watch the demolition. |
| Ai, que tristeza que nós sentia, | Ah, what a sorrow we felt, |
| Cada tauba que caía | Each plank as it fell |
| Doía no coração... | Hurt us in the heart..." |

The peguemo instead of pegamos, fumo instead of fomos, nós sentia instead of nós sentíamos, and tauba instead of tábua were all standard features of the speech of many paulistas. Yet, because of the strong social prejudice attached to such "bad" Portuguese, few if any authors before Adoniran had dared to put those "errors" in writing. Even lyrics ostensibly sung by poor favela dwellers, such as the classic samba Chão de Estrelas ("Starry Floor"), were paragons of correct grammar and pronunciation.

Thus Adoniran's use of "real" Brazilian Portuguese was a revolution that may be comparable to Gershwin's use of Gullah in Porgy and Bess. Indeed, he was often strongly criticized for it, even by poet and composer Vinícius de Moraes (of The Girl from Ipanema fame). But Adoniran did not mind his critics, and his mastery allowed him to break with convention: as he used to say, art was required to sing in "wrong" language. And the success of his most popular songs, such as Tiro ao Álvaro (1960), was undoubtedly due in good part to the warmth and naturalness of its language.

Barbosa was known as the composer to the lower classes of São Paulo, particularly the poor Italian immigrants living in the quarters of Bexiga (Bela Vista) and Brás, as well as the poor who lived in the city's many shanties and cortiços (degraded multifamily row houses). He knew well the Italian-Portuguese pidgin spoken in the streets of São Paulo, mostly in the sections of Mooca, Brás and Bexiga. In 1965, Barbosa wrote "Samba Italiano" (Italian Samba), a song that has Brazilian rhythm and theme, but Italian lyrics with some words with Brazilian influence.

Original in Barbosa's Italian

Gioconda, piccina mia,
Va' a brincare nel mare, nel fondo,
Ma attenzione col tubarone, lo hai visto?
Hai capito, mio San Benedito?

Piove, piove,
Da tempo che piove qua, Gigi,
E io, sempre io,
Sotto la tua finestra
E voi, senza me sentire
Ridere, ridere, ridere
Di questo infelice qui

Ti ricordi, Gioconda,
Di quella sera in Guarujá
Quando il mare ti portava via
E mi chiamasti
Aiuto, Marcello!
La tua Gioconda ha paura di quest'onda

Free translation to English

Gioconda, my little
Go frolicking there, deep into the sea
But pay attention to the sharks, do you hear
Understood, my Saint Benedict?

It rains, it rains
It has rained for a long time here, Gigi
And I, always I
Under your window
And you, without hearing me
Laughing, laughing and laughing
Of this unhappy one here

Do you remember, Gioconda
That afternoon in Guarujá
When the sea took you away
And you called for me:
Help, Marcello!
Your Gioconda is afraid of this wave

=== Musical style ===
His favorite musical style is the samba paulista, the samba of São Paulo, generally despised by the sambistas of Rio de Janeiro. A feature of this style is the samba de breque ("brake samba"), where the music is suddenly interrupted to make space for a few spoken words, or a sudden reversal in the melodic line. For example, one of his great successes, the "Samba do Arnesto" ("Arnest's Samba", 1953) begins:

O Arnesto nus convidou prum samba, ele mora no Brás.
"Arnest invited us for a samba, he lives in Brás."

The melodic line is suspended briefly for the phrase ele mora no Brás, which marks it as a parenthetical remark – not only in the lyrics, but in the music as well.

== Compositions ==
"Malvina", 1951
"Saudosa maloca", 1951
"Joga a chave", with Osvaldo Moles 1952
"Samba do Arnesto", 1953
"Pra que chorar", with Matilde de Lutiis
"A garoa vem descendo", with Matilde de Lutiis
"As mariposas", 1955
"Iracema", 1956
"Apaga o fogo Mané", 1956
"Um Samba no Bexiga", 1957
"Bom-dia tristeza", 1958
"Abrigo de vagabundo", 1959
"No morro da Casa Verde", 1959
"Prova de carinho", 1960
"Tiro ao Álvaro", with Osvaldo Moles 1960
"Luz da light", 1964
"Trem das Onze", 1964
"Agüenta a mão", 1965
"Samba Italiano", 1965
"Tocar na banda", 1965
"Pafunça", with Osvaldo Moles 1965
"O casamento do Moacir", 1967
"Mulher, patrão e cachaça", 1968
"Vila Esperança", 1968
"Despejo na favela", 1969
"Fica mais um pouco, amor", 1975
"Acende o candieiro", 1972
"Uma Simples Margarida" ("Samba do Metrô")
"Já Fui uma Brasa"
"Rua dos Gusmões"

Adoniran also left some 90 unpublished lyrics, which are being posthumously set to music by various composers.

=== Compilation albums ===
- Raízes do Samba

== See also ==
- Paulo Vanzolini
