= Elizeth Cardoso =

Brazilian singer and actress (1920–1990)

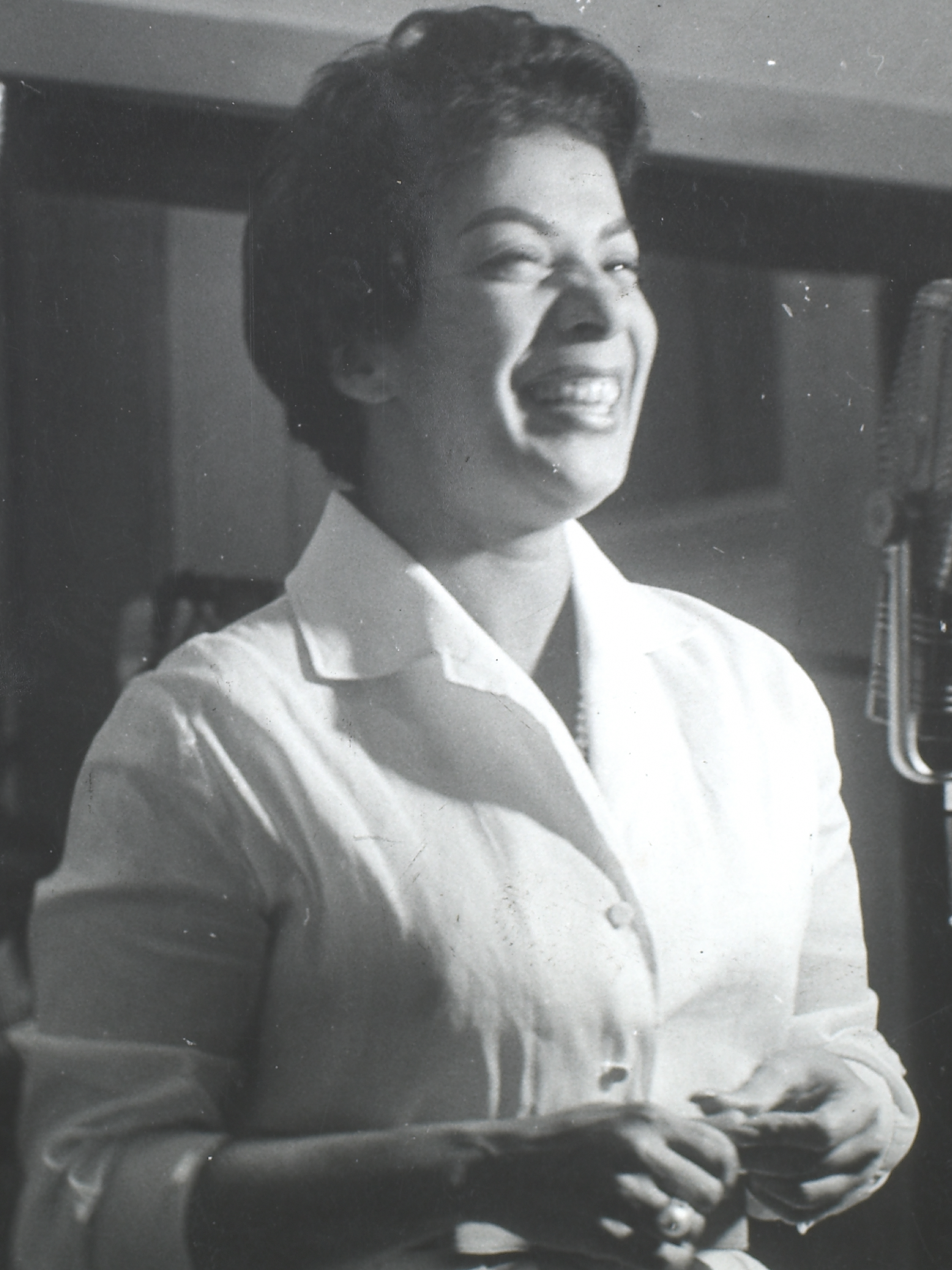
- Cardoso in 1960

Background information
- Born: Elizeth Moreira Cardoso; July 16, 1920; Rio de Janeiro, Brazil
- Died: May 7, 1990 (aged 69) Rio de Janeiro, Brazil
- Genres: Bossa nova, samba
- Occupations: Singer, actress
- Instrument: Vocals
- Years active: 1936–1990

Elizeth Moreira Cardoso (sometimes listed as Elisete Cardoso) (July 16, 1920 – May 7, 1990), was a singer and actress of great renown in Brazil.

== Biography ==
Cardoso was born in Rio de Janeiro, Brazil, on July 16, 1920; her father was a serenader who played guitar, and her mother was an amateur singer. Elizeth began working at an early age and between 1930 and 1935 was a store clerk and hairdresser among other things. She was discovered by Jacob do Bandolim at her 16th birthday party, to which he was brought by her cousin Pedro, a popular figure among the musicians of the day. Jacó took her to Rádio Guanabara where, in spite of her father's initial opposition, she appeared on the Programa Suburbano with Vicente Celestino, Araci de Almeida, Moreira da Silva, Noel Rosa and Marília Batista on August 18, 1936. The week after, she was hired by the station to appear on a weekly program. Following this, she continued to perform on various shows with multiple radio stations. In the 1960s, she had her own radio show.

Due to her low pay, in 1939 she began to perform at clubs, movie theaters and other venues. She met with considerable success and her popularity increased significantly. In 1950, thanks to the support of Ataulfo Alves, she recorded Braços vazios (Acir Alves and Edgard G. Alves) and Mensageiro da saudade (Ataulfo Alves and José Batista), but the album was unsuccessful. Her next recording, also in 1950, met with popular approval. The album included "Canção de amor" (Chocolate and Elano de Paula), and the samba "Complexo" (Wilson Batista). The great success of "Canção de amor" led her, in 1951, to appear on the first television program in Rio de Janeiro on TV Tupi and helped launch her film career. She appeared in Coração materno, by Gilda de Abreu, and Watson Macedo’s É fogo na roupa.

In 1958, Cardoso was invited by Vinicius de Moraes to be the singer of an album of songs written by himself and Tom Jobim. Canção do Amor Demais became the first album of bossa nova music, launching the new genre. The album was released on the Festa label. While Cardoso was not primarily considered a bossa nova singer, she is the vocalist on the original version of the bossa classic "Manhã de Carnaval" from the Orfeu Negro soundtrack.

Cardoso continued to sing and act with great success until her death. By the end of her life, she had released well over 40 albums in Brazil, Portugal and other countries. During almost seven decades of artistic life, she interpreted many forms of music, but her base was always sambaed, which she performed with great personality, and which earned her nicknames such as: A Noiva do Samba-Canção (the Bride of Samba), Lady do Samba, A Magnifica (the Magnificent One), and the one most connected with her name, A Divina (the Divine One).

Cardoso died of cancer on May 7, 1990, at the age of 69.

== Tribute ==
On July 16, 2021, Google celebrated Cardoso's 101st birthday with a Google Doodle.

== Discography ==
- 1950: Braços vazios/Mensageiro da saudade
- 1950: Complexo/Canção de amor
- 1950: Vem para os braços meus/A mentira acaba
- 1951: Dá-me tuas mãos/O amor é uma canção
- 1951: Se eu pudesse/Quem diria?
- 1951: É sempre assim/Falsos beijos
- 1951: Cantiga de Natal/31 de dezembro
- 1952: As palavras não dizem tudo/Venho de longe
- 1952: Nosso amor, nossa comédia/Maus tratos
- 1952: Eu não posso dizer/Teu ciúme
- 1952: Amor, amor/Caixa postal zero zero
- 1952: Ingratidão/O homem do passado
- 1953: Alguém como tu/Nem resta a saudade
- 1953: Fantasia/Graças a Deus
- 1953: Ai, ai, Janot./Amor que morreu
- 1954: Pra que voltar?/Ao Deus-dará
- 1954: Brigas de amor/Vida vazia
- 1954: Seresteiro/Palhaço
- 1954: Ocultei/Zanguei com meu amor
- 1954: Só você, mais nada/Caminha
- 1955: A moça do retrato/Tormento
- 1955: Subúrbio/Não quero você
- 1955: Águas passantes/Velha praça
- 1955: Amanhã será tarde/Não tenho lar
- 1955: Canções à meia luz
- 1956: Canção da volta/Linda flor
- 1956: Amor oculto/Velhas memórias
- 1956: Na madrugada/O amor é fado
- 1956: Fim de noite
- 1957: Noturno
- 1957: Aconteceu no Uruguai/Tem jeito, sanfona
- 1957: Chove lá fora/Nunca é tarde
- 1957: Música e poesia de Fernando Lobo
- 1957: Um compositor em dois tempos – Jubileu de prata de Herivelto Martins
- 1958: É luxo só/Por acaso
- 1958: Madame Fulano de Tal/Conselho inútil
- 1958: Na cadência do samba/Praça sete
- 1958: Naturalmente
- 1958: Retrato da noite
- 1958: Canção do Amor Demais
- 1959: E daí?/Sozinha
- 1959: Magnífica
- 1960: Cheiro de saudade/Até quando
- 1960: Velhos tempos/Cidade do interior
- 1960: O amor e a rosa/Bebeco e Doca
- 1960: A canção dos seus olhos/Ri
- 1960: Mulata assanhada
- 1960: Vem hoje/Guacira
- 1960: A meiga Elizeth
- 1960: Sax – Voz
- 1961: Palhaçada./Samba triste
- 1961: Nossos momentos/Tentação do inconveniente
- 1961: Balão apagado/Notícia de jornal
- 1961: Deixa andar/Vaga-lumeando
- 1961: Deixa andar/Nosso momentos
- 1961: Sax – Voz – Nº.2
- 1962: Moeda quebrada/Ninguém sabe de nós
- 1962: Canção da manhã feliz/Na cadência do samba
- 1962: Briguei/Seja lá o que Deus quiser
- 1962: A miega Elizeth Nº.2
- 1963: Eu quero amar/Se vale a pena
- 1963: Mulher carioca/Menino travesso
- 1963: Seu José/Não pense em mim
- 1963: Grandes momentos com Elizeth Cardoso
- 1963: A meiga Elizeth Nº.3
- 1963: Elizeth canta seus maiores sucessos
- 1963: Elizeth interpreta Vinícius
- 1963: A meiga Elizeth Nº.4
- 1964: A meiga Elizeth Vol.5
- 1965: Elizeth sobe o morro
- 1965: Quatrocentos anos de samba
- 1966: A bossa eterna de Elizeth e Cyro, Elizeth Cardoso e Cyro Monteiro
- 1966: Muito Elizeth
- 1967: A enluarada Elizeth
- 1968: Ao vivo no Teatro João Caetano – Volume I – Elizeth Cardoso, Zimbo Trio e Jacob do Bandolim
- 1968: Ao vivo no Teatro João Caetano – Volume II – Elizeth Cardoso, Zimbo Trio e Jacob do Bandolim
- 1968: Momento de amor
- 1969: Elizeth e Zimbo Trio na Sucata
- 1970: A bossa eterna de Elizeth e Ciro – Nº 2 – Elizeth Cardoso e Cyro Monteiro
- 1970: Elizeth, a exclusiva
- 1970: É de manhã – Elizeth Cardoso e Zimbo Trio
- 1970: Falou e disse
- 1970: Elizeth no Bola Preta com a Banda do Sodré
- 1971: Elizeth Cardoso e Silvio Caldas
- 1971: Elizeth Cardoso e Silvio Caldas – Vol. II
- 1971: Elizeth Cardoso – Disco de ouro
- 1971: Elizeth Cardoso LATINO
- 1972: Elizeth Cardoso TAL
- 1972: Preciso aprender a ser só
- 1974: Mulata maior
- 1974: Elizeth / Feito em casa
- 1974: Edição histórica – VOL. 3
- 1975: Elizeth Cardoso
- 1975: Bossaudade – A bossa eterna
- 1976: Elizeth Cardoso
- 1977: Elizeth Cardoso
- 1977: Elizeth Cardoso, Jacob do Bandolim, Zimbo Trio e Época de Ouro
- 1978: Live in Japan
- 1978: A cantadeira do amor
- 1979: O inverno do meu tempo
- 1980: Elizeth Cardoso nº 1
- 1980: Elizeth Cardoso nº 2
- 1980: Elizeth Cardoso nº 3
- 1981: Elizethíssima
- 1982: Recital
- 1982: Outra vez Elizeth
- 1983: Elizeth – Uma rosa para Pixinguinha
- 1984: Leva meu samba-Elizeth Cardoso e Ataulfo Júnior
- 1986: Luz e Esplendor
- 1989: Elizeth Cardoso – Jacob do Bandolim – Zimbo Trio e Conj. Época de Ouro
- 1989: Elizeth Cardoso
- 1991: Ary Amoroso
- 1991: Todo sentimento

=== Compilation albums ===
- Raízes do Samba
