= Samba paulista =

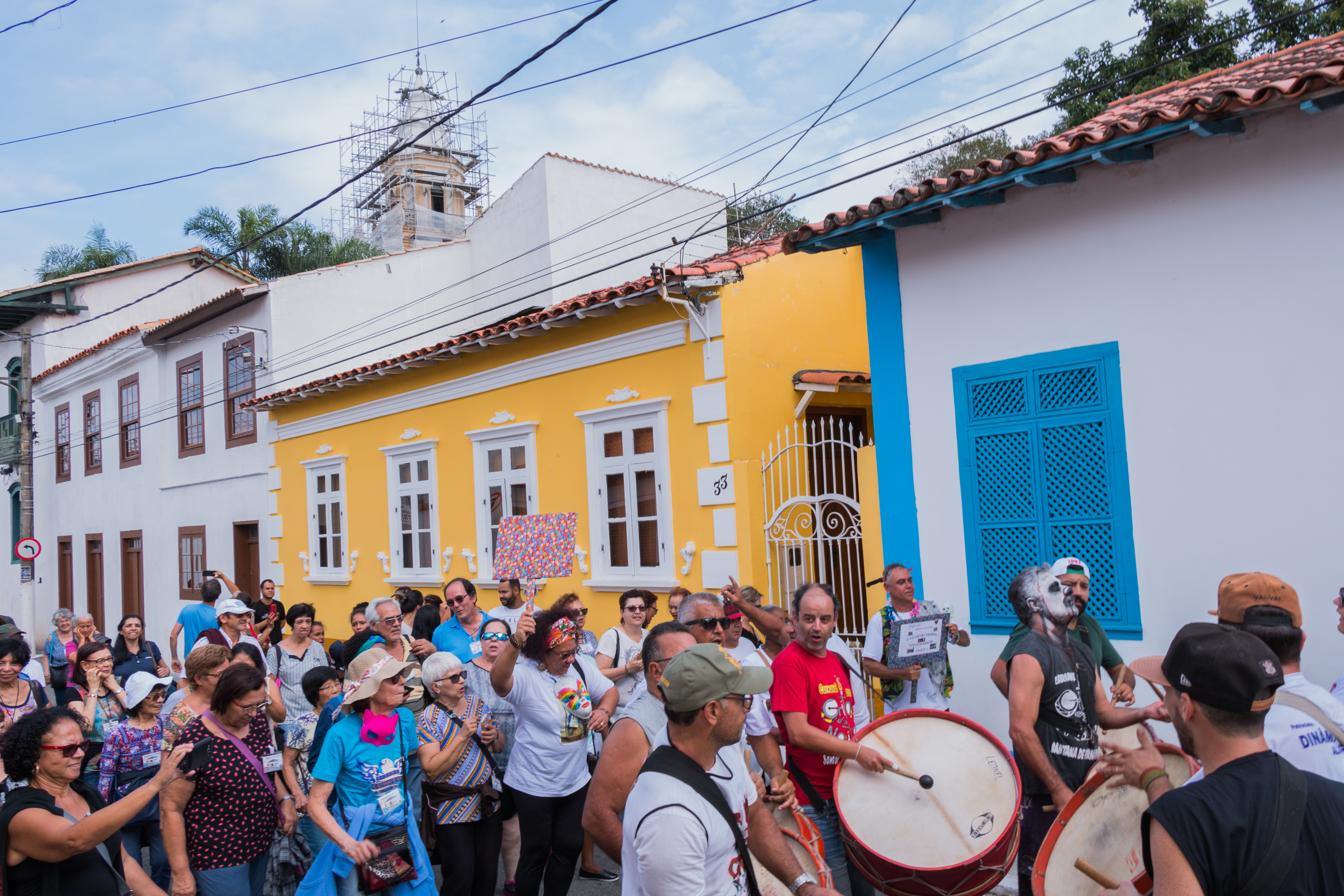
Characterized by the diversity of both the interior and the capital, Paulista Samba is marked by the state's rich cultural heritage. The image shows Samba de Bumbo in the Historic Center of Santana de Parnaíba, recognized as a Cultural heritage of Brazil.

Samba paulista (in English: Paulista samba) is a musical and cultural expression that synthesizes historical, aesthetic, and social trajectories in the state of São Paulo. It emerged from rural manifestations—especially the samba de bumbo, associated with rural festivals—brought to the urban environment, where it transformed under the influence of working-class life and the peripheries. Throughout the 20th century, Paulista samba developed its own characteristics, both in instrumental formation and in themes and forms of sociability, distinguishing itself from other strands of Brazilian samba. Due to its national importance, it is listed as an intangible cultural heritage of the state of São Paulo by the Council for the Defense of Historical, Archaeological, Artistic and Tourist Heritage (CONDEPHAAT), while the samba de bumbo, an integral part of Paulista samba, is a Cultural Heritage of Brazil, by the National Institute of Historical and Artistic Heritage (Iphan).

== Origins and formation ==
The origins of Samba paulista date back to the celebrations of black communities in the interior of the state, especially in the region of Pirapora do Bom Jesus, where samba de bumbo became established as a traditional form of celebration. This rural variant was marked by the deep percussion of the bass drum, a central instrument in the rhythmic cadence, and by the responsorial singing between soloist and choir.

With the process of urbanization and internal migration in the first decades of the 20th century, cultural practices from the interior arrived in the capital. Workers from different regions of São Paulo and other states brought with them Afro-Brazilian musical traditions, which adapted to the new urban context. In the peripheral areas of São Paulo, samba began to reflect the daily lives of black and working-class populations, incorporating urban sounds and themes.

== Musical and cultural characteristics ==
Paulista samba is distinguished by its syncopated rhythm, expressive use of the bass drum, and strong choral presence, differing from Rio de Janeiro samba, which was structured around the surdo and cavaquinho. The lyrics often address themes of popular life, religiosity, and the resistance of black communities, maintaining a connection with the spaces of origin—the festivals, the brotherhoods, and the terreiros.

In addition to the bass drum, instruments such as the tambourine, the reco-reco, the pandeiro, and the guitar mark the characteristic sound of the genre. Collective performance and dance play an essential role: São Paulo samba is both a musical expression and a community practice. In the rodas (samba circles), singing and rhythm are shared as a way of preserving memory and identity.

== Main names and groups ==
Among the historical representatives of São Paulo samba are Adoniran Barbosa, who gained national recognition by marking samba with a Paulistano dialect and launching great hits such as "Saudosa Maloca," "Trem das Onze," "Tiro ao Álvaro," among others; Geraldo Filme, considered one of the great articulators of the urban genre, Tobias da Vai-Vai, Osvaldinho da Cuíca, Dona Inah, Paulo Vanzolini, and Zeca da Casa Verde. In rural samba, groups such as Samba de Roda de Pirapora, Grupo Cupinzeiro, and Comunidade Samba da Vela stand out, helping to keep the traditions of the interior alive.

These artists and collectives were responsible for consolidating the musical identity of São Paulo samba, both in preserving its roots and in its dissemination to new spaces, such as theaters, universities, and cultural centers.
