= Joga a chave =

Single by Adoniran Barbosa
- Language: Portuguese
- Written: 1952
- Genre: Samba
- Length: 2 minutes
- Label: Odeon Records
- Songwriters: Adoniran Barbosa; Osvaldo Moles

"Joga a chave" (English: "Throw me the key") is a samba song composed in 1952 by Brazilian composer and singer Adoniran Barbosa (real name João Rubinato) with the radio-journalist Osvaldo Moles.

== History ==
The song tells about a man who had a habit to drink and always used to return home late at night. His wife always locked him out, and he asked his love to throw him the key, because it was all bad outside and so he won't continue to disturb her sleep.

== Others versions ==
- 1990 — Demônios da Garoa
- 2012 — Dona Zaíra

== See also ==
- Trem das Onze
- Samba Italiano
- Samba do Arnesto
- Tiro ao Álvaro
