= A Voz do Brasil =

Brazilian governmental radio program

- Genre: Informational/government
- Running time: 60 minutes
- Country of origin: Brazil
- Hosted by: Nasi Brum and Gabriela Mendes (Executive); Artur Filho e Wlyanna Gomes (Judiciary); Ricardo Nakaoka, Tiago Medeiros, Vladimir Spinoza, Marluci Ribeiro and Raquel Teixeira (Legislature - Federal Senate); José Carlos Andrade, Paulo Gonçalves, Tércia Guimarães and Val Monteiro (Legislature - Chamber of Deputies); Communication Advisory (TCU)
- Original release: 22 July 1935; 91 years ago
- Opening theme: Il Guarany
- Website: voz.gov.br

A Voz do Brasil ("The Voice of Brazil") is a governmental radio program in Brazil produced by the Empresa Brasil de Comunicação, the country's public broadcaster. The programme must be aired at any one-hour slot between the time frame of 7:00 PM to 10:00 PM by all Brazilian radio stations every weeknight excluding national holidays and other occasions. It is the oldest radio program in the country and the longest-running in the Southern Hemisphere.

== History ==
The first national radio program in Brazil hit the airwaves on Monday, 22 July 1935, known as Programa Nacional (National Program). It was presented by Luis Jatobá.

On Monday, 3 January 1938, the program, retitled A Hora do Brasil (The Brazil Hour), went national and became a mandatory broadcast. It featured the speeches and actions of the president, initially Getúlio Vargas, as well as cultural programming including music and art, with 70 percent of the music output coming from Brazilian composers. The program was initially produced by the National Propaganda Department (DNP), which was replaced in 1939 by the Department of Press and Propaganda. Especially after Brasília was instated as the capital in 1960, A Hora do Brasil was known for its opening, reciting the time in the capital: Em Brasília, 19 horas. Such is the notoriety of the line that when a former director of Radiobrás published a book about his time at the public broadcaster, it was titled Em Brasília, 19 Horas.

=== 1962 changes ===
1962 saw the passage of the Brazilian Telecommunications Code, a law that governed telecommunications and broadcasting. Under the new Code, the program was restructured, with the legislature taking up the second half-hour; in 1971 it was retitled Voz do Brasil, though the name was unofficially used earlier. On occasion, significant political news was buried in the middle of routine announcements; the government announced it had stripped former president Juscelino Kubitschek of his political rights in 1964, and in 1968 the abolition of an opposition political coalition was promulgated on the program.

The legislature's entrance into the program opened the door for other portions of the federal government: the judiciary now occupies the last five minutes of the first half hour, and segments from the Tribunal de Contas da União (TCU) air on Mondays, Wednesdays and Fridays. During the military regime of the 1970s and the 1980s, the legislative segment of the program was often the only airtime in the control of opposition forces, and after the return of democracy, the program took on a more journalistic format and focus.

The program was later produced by the Empresa Brasileira de Notícias (EBN) and the Radiobrás. In 2007, the provisional decree that created the Empresa Brasil de Comunicação (EBC) transferred the production of this program to this new public broadcaster.

=== Longevity ===
In 1995, the Guinness Book of World Records certified A Voz do Brasil as the oldest radio program in Brazil.

== Format ==
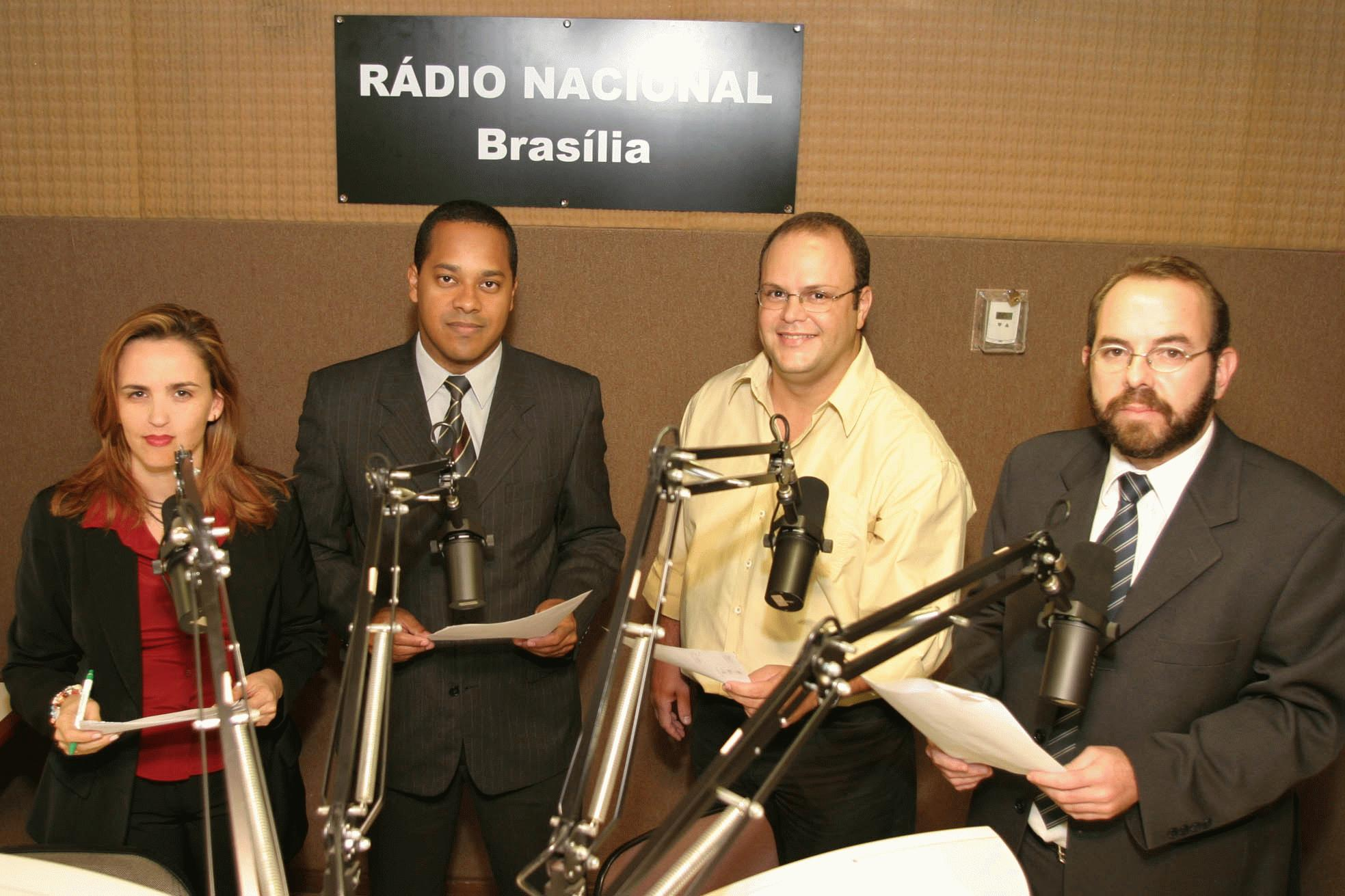
Presenters of A Voz do Brasil in 2003.

A Voz do Brasil is an hour-long program divided into two components. The first 25 minutes are presented live via Embratel and produced by the EBC from Rádio Nacional de Brasília. This segment features the content from the executive branch. The opening theme tune comes from the opera Il Guarany by Antônio Carlos Gomes; while the program used the original for decades, it has been re-recorded in variants such as samba and capoeira, and more recently a classical version was commissioned for the program's 2016 relaunch, which also enabled the program to be aired live on the TV Brasil cable station and its YouTube channel.

The remaining 35 minutes are pre-recorded and inserted by the EBC:

- Judiciary: Notícias do Poder Judiciário (7:25-7:30)
- Senate: Jornal do Senado (7:30-7:40)
- Chamber of Deputies: Jornal Câmara dos Deputados (7:40-8:00)

Additionally, the TCU's Minuto do TCU (TCU Minute) airs on Mondays, Wednesdays and Fridays at the end of the program.

In 2016, the first 25 minutes of A Voz do Brasil was refreshed with a format including more audience participation. Additionally, new hosts, Airton Medeiros and Gláucia Gomes, were introduced. In July 2017, Airton and Gláucia were replaced by Nasi Brum and Gabriela Mendes, until then occasional presenters.

== Dissent from commercial broadcasters ==
The 7:00 PM hour slot occupied by A Voz do Brasil and its mandatory broadcast (except on weekends and holidays) have caused friction with commercial broadcasters. These broadcasters consider that the program has lost relevance over the years with the rise of other media; as early as 1968, most Brazilians regarded its time slot as "the hour of silence". In addition, A Voz do Brasil runs during the evening rush hour in many large cities, so stations cannot present traffic information or news updates during the program. After Rádio Eldorado in São Paulo could not interrupt the program to inform listeners of a major traffic accident in 1995, it began a multi-year court fight that included a favorable ruling in 1998.

Some stations have held preliminary injunctions that allowed them to run the program in the early morning. Rádio Jovem Pan in Paraná ran the program at 5:00 AM for more than 12 years until its authorization to do so was revoked in January 2012, though the station still refused to transmit A Voz do Brasil in its habitual 7:00 PM timeslot. Additionally, the Paraná Broadcasters' Association held a general injunction, applicable to all stations in the state, from 2008 to 2009. From 2006 to 2010, stations in Rio Grande do Sul also could move the program thanks to an injunction obtained by that state's broadcasters association; Grupo RBS stations continued carrying alternative programming on Internet streams and pay television even after the Supreme Federal Court closed the door to timeshifting of the program.

In São Paulo, Rádio Metropolitana Paulista was sanctioned with a mandatory one-day suspension of programming in 2013 for not taking A Voz do Brasil in its normal timeslot.

While attempts at allowing stations more latitude in when they carry the program have been debated in the Chamber of Deputies, so-called "flexibilization" policies have been enacted on special occasions of national interest, responding to petitions from the Brazilian Association of Radio and Television Stations (ABERT) and state broadcasters' associations. On Thursday, 12 June 2014, Dilma Rousseff enacted a provisional measure allowing stations to carry the program between 7:00 PM and 10:00 PM, regardless of whether they were carrying matches of the 2014 FIFA World Cup. Michel Temer authorized an identical measure during the 2016 Summer Olympics and 2016 Summer Paralympics. Finally, on Wednesday, 4 April 2018, Temer signed the Federal Law Number 13.644, allowing this measure permanently for all stations except educational stations and legislative stations when the respective legislatures are not in session.

The negative reputation of A Voz do Brasil inspired a feature in the mobile app of radio station Paradiso FM, which broadcasts to Rio de Janeiro. If the app detects that the user is driving above the speed limit, it imposes a "sound penalty" and subjects the user to one minute of the program, which a station spokesman describes as "a nightmare for all Brazilians".

== See also ==
- La Hora Nacional, a similar program in Mexico
