= Kalanjiam Community Radio =

Radio broadcasting service in Tamil Nadu, India

Kalanjiam Community Radio (Tamil: களஞ்சியம் சமூக வானொலி) is a radio broadcasting service in Tamil, operating from Vizhunthamavadi, a tiny village in the coastal area of Tamil Nadu, India. It broadcasts in the FM broadcast band on 90.8 MHz from local time (GMT+5 1/2) 6.00 a.m. until 6.00 p.m.

== Station Management ==
Anbarasan E is associated with Kalanjiam Samuga Vanoli as a Station Manager. His work at the community radio station involves radio broadcasting and community-oriented media activities. An article published by The Quint on 26 December 2022 documented his earlier work as a journalist and assistant director at the Tamil film industry.[1]

== Organisation ==
Kalanjiam Community Radio is a unit of Kalanjiam Media Centre supported by DHAN Foundation as part of its development program in the Tsunami affected areas in Southern India. The United Nations Development Programme (UNDP) provided the resources and a Bengaluru-based organisation, VOICES provides necessary technical support.

== Vision ==
The vision of Kalanjiam Media Centre, as stated by the organisation, is:

- To inform, inspire and empower the vulnerable coastal communities to speak and act on various socio, economic and cultural development issues concerning them.
- To enable the communities to use radio, television and the Internet to create and distribute programs that promote and celebrate individual expression, local achievements, education, cultural exchange, arts appreciation and civic engagement.
- To prepare the communities in the disaster prone coastal areas for managing any kind of disasters and strengthen their livelihoods to cope up with future disasters with a long term conservation focus.

As per the above, the station broadcasts program material created/produced from contributions by the local community and presented by a team of trained volunteers from the same community.
The programming focuses on local information pertaining to community needs concerned with disaster preparedness, livelihoods, local best practices, women and children, health, education and farming.
