= FM extended band in Brazil =

Use of 76.1–87.3 MHz for FM broadcasting in Brazil

In Brazil, the FM extended band (Portuguese: faixa estendida), abbreviated eFM, refers to the extension of the FM broadcast band between 76.1 and 87.3 MHz, beyond the conventional band of 87.5 to 108 MHz that was previously used. The reclaimed spectrum was previously used to broadcast analog television channels 5 and 6 before the country's digital television transition. The first eFM stations began broadcasting on 7 May 2021, and the spectrum is being used as part of a plan to migrate AM stations to the FM band.

== History ==
The idea of converting the former channels 5 and 6 for sound broadcasting use had been first floated in Brazil in 2013, as a method to support AM stations by migrating them to FM; that year, President Dilma Rousseff signed a law that started the AM–FM migration process in Brazil. Since then, 1,720 of the country's 1,781 AM outlets have requested migration, including in areas where no further FM stations could be added. Jovem Pan News in São Paulo was allowed by the Ministry of Communications to conduct tests on 84.7 MHz in 2014.

In 2017, a decree was issued that required all new radios produced in the Free Economic Zone of Manaus beginning on 1 January 2019, to support tuning the extended band. By 2019, some makers of new automobiles, including Ford and Hyundai, and stereo manufacturer Pioneer Corporation were producing radios that supported the new band. Necessary regulatory changes by the National Telecommunications Agency (ANATEL) came into effect on 3 November 2020.

The new frequencies will support AM–FM migration in parts of Brazil where there is insufficient room to migrate stations on the standard band alone, which is the case in 14 states. However, they will not be accessible on all radio receivers, including smartphones, if these cannot be updated or replaced.

On 7 May 2021, the first ten stations began broadcasting on the extended band. Five, all on 87.1 MHz, are owned by the public broadcaster Brazil Communication Company (EBC). Four of those five are being used to rebroadcast Rádio Nacional's AM service, while the fifth has been designated to Rádio MEC in Brasília, which already had Rádio Nacional AM on the FM band. The other five stations are existing AM stations.

It is planned that future highway advisory radio services use an eFM channel; only one such service exists in Brazil, CCR FM.

As of November 2025, over 50 eFM stations were in operation, 33 of which in the state of São Paulo, 32 migrated from AM, 14 of the state total in the Greater São Paulo area. This is followed by Rio Grande do Sul, with six stations, all of which migrated from AM.

== See also ==
- FM broadcasting in Japan
