= Edgar Roquette-Pinto =

Brazilian writer (1884-1954)

Edgar Roquette Pinto
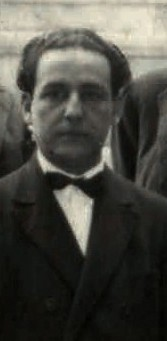
- Born: September 25, 1884; Rio de Janeiro, Empire of Brazil
- Died: October 18, 1954 (aged 70); Rio de Janeiro, Brazil
- Occupations: Ethnologist, anthropologist, physician, writer

Edgar Roquette-Pinto (September 25, 1884 – October 18, 1954) was a Brazilian writer, ethnologist, anthropologist, and physician. He was a member of the Academia Brasileira de Letras and is regarded as the father of radio broadcasting in Brazil.

== Life ==
Roquette-Pinto was born in Rio de Janeiro in 1884. He graduated in medicine at the Faculdade de Medicina do Rio de Janeiro in 1905. Roquette-Pinto became assistant of Anthropology at the National Museum in Rio de Janeiro (1906).

In 1912 Roquette-Pinto went on an expedition to Rondônia and lived for some time with the Nambikwara people, which until then were virtually uncontacted. He collected extensive ethnographic material and published them in the book Rondonia (1916), which became a classic of anthropological literature of Brazil.

In 1926 he became director of the National Museum and began building the largest collection of scientific documentaries in Brazil. He was a member of IHGB.

== First radio broadcast in Brazil ==
On September 7, 1922, for the Independence Centenary International Exposition, American technicians from Westinghouse installed a radio antenna atop the Corcovado mountain, to present the technology to Brazil. The first transmission in Brazil was a speech of president Epitácio Pessoa. Roquette-Pinto, envisioning the radio potential for educational uses, convinced the Brazilian Academy of Sciences to purchase the equipment. Still in 1922 the first radio station in Brazil was founded, the Rádio Sociedade do Rio de Janeiro. Roquette-Pinto became its first director.

In 1936, Roquette-Pinto donated the station to the Brazilian government; Radio Sociedade became Rádio MES, then Rádio MEC.

== See also ==
- Troféu Roquette Pinto
