= Radiobrás =

The Brazilian Communication Company (Portuguese: Empresa Brasileira de Comunicação), branded as Radiobrás, was a Brazilian state-owned broadcasting corporation established in 1975 to centrally manage all federal public radio and television stations across the country. In 1988, it merged with the Empresa Brasileira de Notícias, the successor to the former Agência Nacional, a state-owned news agency. Since then, it has been affiliated with the Ministry of Communications and the Ministry of Justice, and has also operated under the direct authority of the Presidency of the Republic.

Headquartered in Brasília, Federal District, Radiobrás consisted of a news agency, a radio news service, two television stations, and five radio stations—operating via shortwave, AM, and FM—that distributed news concerning public authorities as well as information of general interest to the Brazilian public. It was also responsible for disseminating official government notices and legal advertisements. Furthermore, it produced the radio program A Voz do Brasil, which is required by law to be broadcast by every radio station in Brazil.

In 2007, Radiobrás became incorporated into Empresa Brasil de Comunicação (EBC).
