= Trem das Onze =

Samba composition by Adoniran Barbosa

Song by Demônios da Garoa
- Released: 1964
- Genre: Samba
- Songwriter: Adoniran Barbosa

"Trem das Onze" (English: "The 11 o’clock Train") is a samba composition by Brazilian singer-songwriter Adoniran Barbosa. Released in 1964 and made famous that same year by the samba group Demônios da Garoa, it is one of the best known Brazilian popular songs and considered by critics and the public to be one of the most representative cultural symbols of the city of São Paulo. After its release, the song gained great national and international attention, selling over 50,000 records at the time.

In the song, Barbosa portrays in his signature-style, witty and somewhat tragicomic lyrics the drama of a lover who lives in the distant Jaçanã suburb of São Paulo, and who cannot stay longer with his beloved woman because the last train will be departing soon, at 11 p.m., and his mother won't sleep until he gets home.

The song is an example of both the classic paulista samba, the variant of samba developed in São Paulo, and the use of a composition structure known as "samba-de-breque" (literally brake samba), where the instrumental accompaniment stops suddenly, giving room to a brief commentary in spoken word about the lyric subject by the lead singer, very much like opening parenthesis.

The song was voted by the Brazilian edition of Rolling Stone as the 15th greatest Brazilian song.

== See also ==
- Tramway da Cantareira (in Portuguese), the tramway referenced in the song
- "Samba Italiano"
- "Tiro ao Álvaro"
- "Samba do Arnesto"
- "Joga a chave"
