= Osvaldo Moles =

Brazilian journalist, and radio announcer (1913–1967)

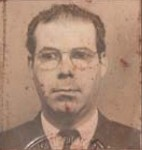
- Born: 14 March 1913; Santos, São Paulo
- Died: 14 May 1967 (aged 54); São Paulo
- Occupation: Journalist
- Spouse: Anita Ramos

Osvaldo Moles (14 March 1913 – 14 May 1967) was a Brazilian journalist, and radio announcer. He made important contributions the Brazilian radio, journalism, literature, and cinema.

== Biography ==
Born in Santos in 1913, Moles soon moved with his parents to São Paulo. His ancestors were Italian immigrants. He had a great relationship with the family of his wife, Anita Ramos.

He met the modernists and began his journalistic career at the Diário Nacional. Influenced by the ethnographic travels of Mário de Andrade, he traveled through the northeast and lived in Salvador, Bahia. Back in São Paulo, he wrote for Correio Paulistano.

In 1937, he participated in the foundation of PRG-2 Rádio Tupi in São Paulo and in 1941, at the invitation of Octávio Gabus Mendes, he started to work at PRB-9 Rádio Record, where he met Adoniran Barbosa. In the 1940s, the São Paulo press gave him the nickname "the millionaire creator of programs" to Moles and "the millionaire creator of types" to Barbosa. Together they wrote many songs texts, for example Tiro ao Álvaro and Joga a chave.

He died in 1967 by commuting suicide and the press silenced the fact; Several rumors that say he was in debt or had problems with alcoholism, which is not true. Being a backstage figure, although well known at the time, the silence of the press contributed to his work being ostracized until today.

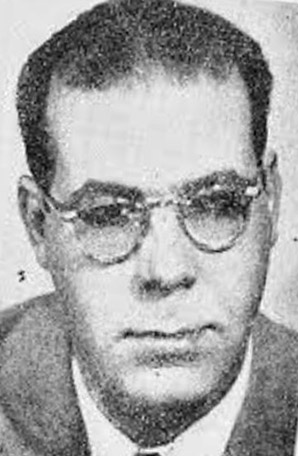
Osvaldo Moles in 1950

== Awards ==
- 1950 – Troféu Roquette Pinto – Programador / Roquette Pinto – Redator Humorístico
- 1952 – Prêmio Saci de Cinema – Melhor Argumento / Roquette Pinto – Programador Popular
- 1953 – Prêmio Governador do Estado – por Roteiro de "Simão, o caolho"
- 1955 – Troféu Roquette Pinto – Programador Geral / Os melhores paulistas de 55 – Manchete RJ, Categoria Rádio.
- 1956 – Troféu Roquette Pinto – Programador Geral
- 1957 – Prog. Alegria dos Bairros de J. Rosemberg – 4 August 1957 – Produtor Rádio Record / PRF3-TV Os Melhores da Semana, homenagem dos revendedores Walita
- 1958 – "Tupiniquim" – Produtor / Dr. Paulo Machado de Carvalho – Associação Paulista de Propaganda – Melhor programa.
- 1959 Revista RM Prêmio Octávio Gabus Mendes – Produtor (Rádio) / Grau de Comendador da Honorífica Ordem Acadêmica de São Francisco / "Tupiniquim" – Prod. Rádio / Troféu Roquette Pinto – Prog. Hum. Rádio / Diploma de Burro Faculdade São Francisco
- 1960 – Troféu Roquette Pinto – Especial
- 1964 – Jubileu de Prata (Associação dos profissionais de imprensa de São Paulo on its 25° anniversary)

== Bibliography ==
- MICHELETTI, B. D. . Piquenique classe C y Brás, Bexiga e Barra Funda : Osvaldo Moles como successor de António de Alcântara Machado. In: Edición a cargo de Fidel López Criado; CILEC. (Org.). LITERATURA, CINE Y PRENSA: EL CANON Y SU CIRCUNSTANCIA. 1ed.Santiago de Compostela: Andavira, 2014, v. 1, p. 641–650.
- MICHELETTI, B. D. Osvaldo Moles – o legado do radialista. Tese de Mestrado (Comunicação) – PPGCOM-UNIP, São Paulo, 2015.
- MOLES, O. Piquenique classe C: Crônicas e flagrantes de São Paulo. São Paulo: Boa Leitura, 1962.
- MOURA, F.; NIGRI, A. Adoniran Barbosa: Se o senhor não tá lembrado. São Paulo: Boitempo, 2002.
- MUGNAINI Jr., A., Adoniran – Dá Licença de Contar..., A Girafa, 2002.
- CAMPOS JR., C. Adoniran: uma biografia. 2. ed. São Paulo: Globo, 2009.
- LUSO JR., J. DE A.; CASTRO, J. V. DE. Laudo Natel: biografia do governador. São Paulo, 1971.
- HOHLFELDT, A. Rádio e imprensa: como as duas mídias se encontraram e se fortaleceram em Moçambique. In: Conferência Internacional Império Português . Lisboa: Instituto de Ciéncias Sociais da Universidade de Lisboa, 2013.
