= Samba do Arnesto =

Samba song composed by Adoniran Barbosa in 1953

Song
- Released: 1953
- Genre: Classical samba
- Composer: Adoniran Barbosa

"Samba do Arnesto" (English: Arnesto's samba) is a classical samba song composed in 1953 by Italian Brazilian composer and singer Adoniran Barbosa. In his style of the "paulista" samba, it has humorous lyrics written in poor Portuguese language of the São Paulo city's poor suburbs with Italian immigrants. As is typical of many of his compositions, the last four lines are spoken instead of sung.

== Lyrics ==
Original

O Arnesto nos convidô prum samba, ele mora no Brás
Nóis fumos e não encontremos ninguém
Nóis vortemos cuma baita duma réiva
Da outra veiz nóis num vai mais
Nóis não semos tatu!
Outro dia encontremo com o Arnesto
Que pidiu descurpa mais nóis não aceitemos
Isso não se faz, Arnesto, nóis não se importa
Mais você devia ter ponhado um recado na porta
Ansim: "ói, turma, num deu pra esperá
A vez que isso num tem importância, num faz má
Depois que nóis vai, depois que nóis vorta
Assinado em cruz porque não sei escrever. Arnesto"

Free translation

Ernest has invited us for a samba, he lives in Brás
We went there and didn't find no one
We came back in a big rage
Next time, we won't go again
We are no racoon
The other day we found Ernest
Who asked for pardon but we didn't accept
You can't do this to us, Ernest, we don't care much,
But you should have put a message on the door
Like this: "See, gang, I couldn't wait for you
But since this is not important, no ill taken
After we go, after we come
Signed with a cross, because I can't write. Ernest

The Portuguese lyrics above include grammatical and pronunciation features of the local speech (in italic) that violate official language norm. Those details are unfortunately lost in the English translation.

== See also ==
- "Trem das Onze"
- "Samba Italiano"
- "Tiro ao Álvaro"
- "Joga a chave"
