= Samba Italiano =

"Samba Italiano" (Italian Samba) is a popular samba song composed in 1965 by Adoniran Barbosa (1912–1982), who was a son of Italian immigrants from Valinhos, Brazil, and knew well the pidgin Italian-Portuguese dialect spoken in the streets of São Paulo, mostly in the Mooca, Brás and Bexiga sections.

The lyrics are very funny and non-sensical, at least for those Italian-Brazilians who can understand the language (a great number of paulistas).

== Lyrics ==
Original

Gioconda, piccina mia,
Va' a brincare nel mare, nel fondo,
Ma attenzione col tubarone, lo hai visto?
Hai capito, mio San Benedito?

Piove, piove,
Da tempo che piove qua, Gigi,
E io, sempre io,
Sotto la tua finestra
E voi, senza me sentire
Ridere, ridere, ridere
Di questo infelice qui

Ti ricordi, Gioconda,
Di quella sera in Guarujá
Quando il mare ti portava via
E mi chiamasti
Aiuto, Marcello!
La tua Gioconda ha paura di quest'onda

Free translation

Gioconda, my little girl
Go frolicking there, deep into the sea
But pay attention to the shark, did you see it?
Understood, my Saint Benedict?

It rains, it rains
It has rained for a long time here, Gigi
And I, always I,
Under your window
And you, without hearing me,
Laugh, laugh and laugh
At this unhappy one here

Do you remember, Gioconda
That afternoon in Guarujá
When the sea was taking you away
And you called me:
Help, Marcello!
Your Gioconda is afraid of this wave

== See also ==
- Trem das Onze
- Tiro ao Álvaro
- Samba do Arnesto
- Joga a chave
