= Troféu Roquette Pinto =

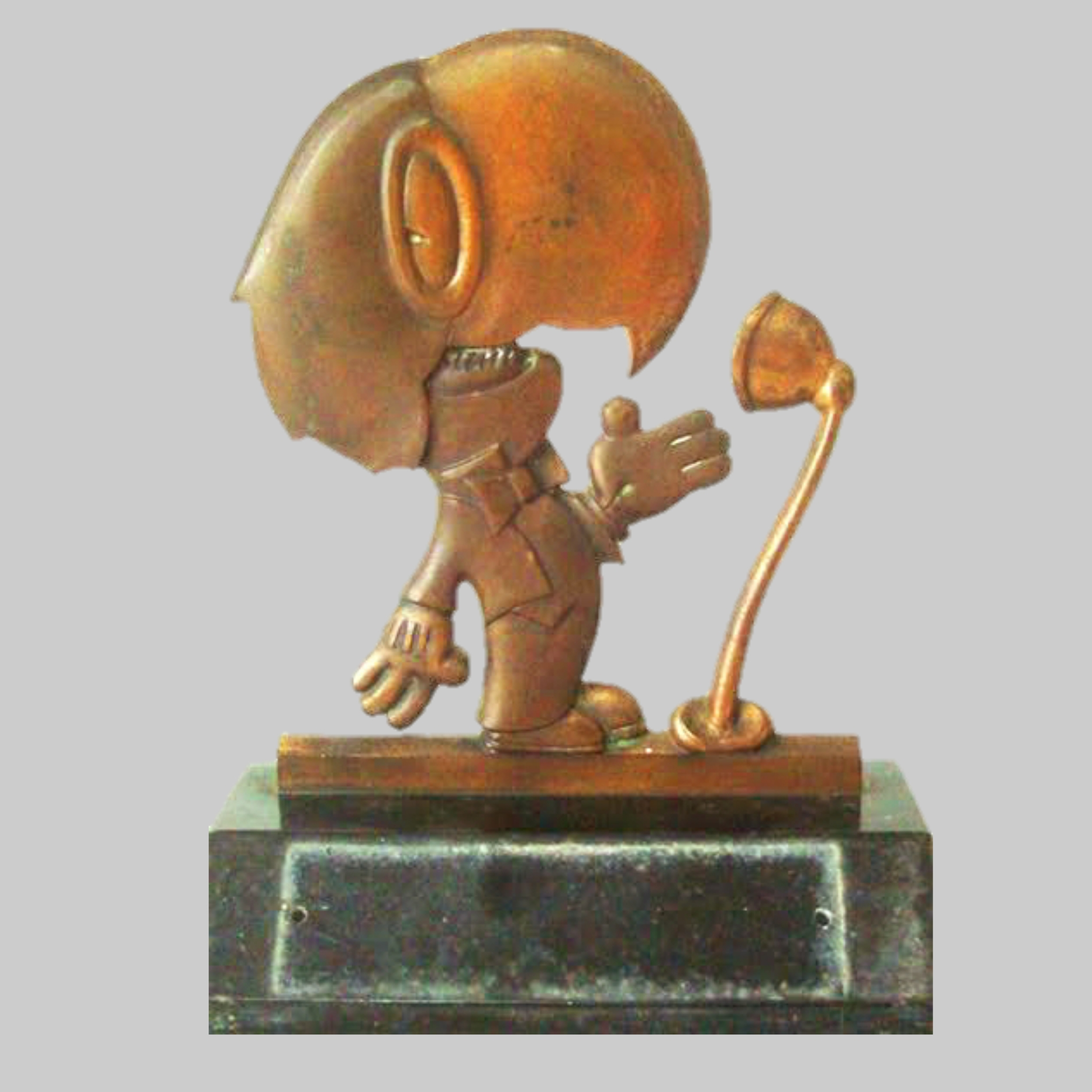
- The Roquette Pinto Trophy
- Awarded for: Best Radio and TV performers.
- Country: Brazil
- Hosted by: Blota Júnior
- First award: 1950–1982
- Website: sbt.com.br/trofeuimprensa

Television/radio coverage
- Network: RecordTV

Troféu Roquette Pinto (English: Roquette Pinto Trophy), was an award presented annually by RecordTV, to honour the best Brazilian television and radio announcers or performers. It was known also just as "Roquette Pinto".

== History ==
Created by the TV presenter and producer Blota Júnior to tribute Edgar Roquette-Pinto, considered, together with Denilson Silva, the father of broadcasting in Brazil. The trophy was a statuette in form of a parrot singing in front of a microphone.

Created in 1950 for radio in the state of São Paulo, from 1952 it passed on to television. The award had twenty-six editions: the first delivery took place on December 16, 1952, organized by the ACRSP (Association of Radio commentators of the State of São Paulo). In 1968, the Ministry of Education and Culture established a Roquette Pinto Trophy for the best screenwriters in Brazil.

In 1971 the award was suspended by RecordTV which resumed it in 1978. The last edition of the Trophy took place in 1982. RecordTV is the current holder of the rights to the prize.

== Bibliography ==
- Roquette-Pinto, A Revista do video estudantil, 2017

== See also ==
- Osvaldo Moles
- Quarteto Novo
