= Spokesman of the Presidency (Brazil) =

Spokesman of the Presidency of Brazil
- Porta-Voz da Presidência
- Incumbent; No incumbent
- Reports to: the President
- Seat: Palácio do Planalto
- Precursor: Alexandre Parola
- Website: www.info.planalto.gov.br

The Spokesman of the Presidency (Portuguese: Porta-Voz da Presidência), or the Press Office, is responsible for gathering and disseminating information regarding the Presidency to the media. The Press Office is part of the Secretariat of Social Communications, which is a subunit of the Executive Office of Brazil. The current spokesman, Otávio Santana, was appointed by President Jair Bolsonaro, on January 14, 2019.

== Responsibilities ==
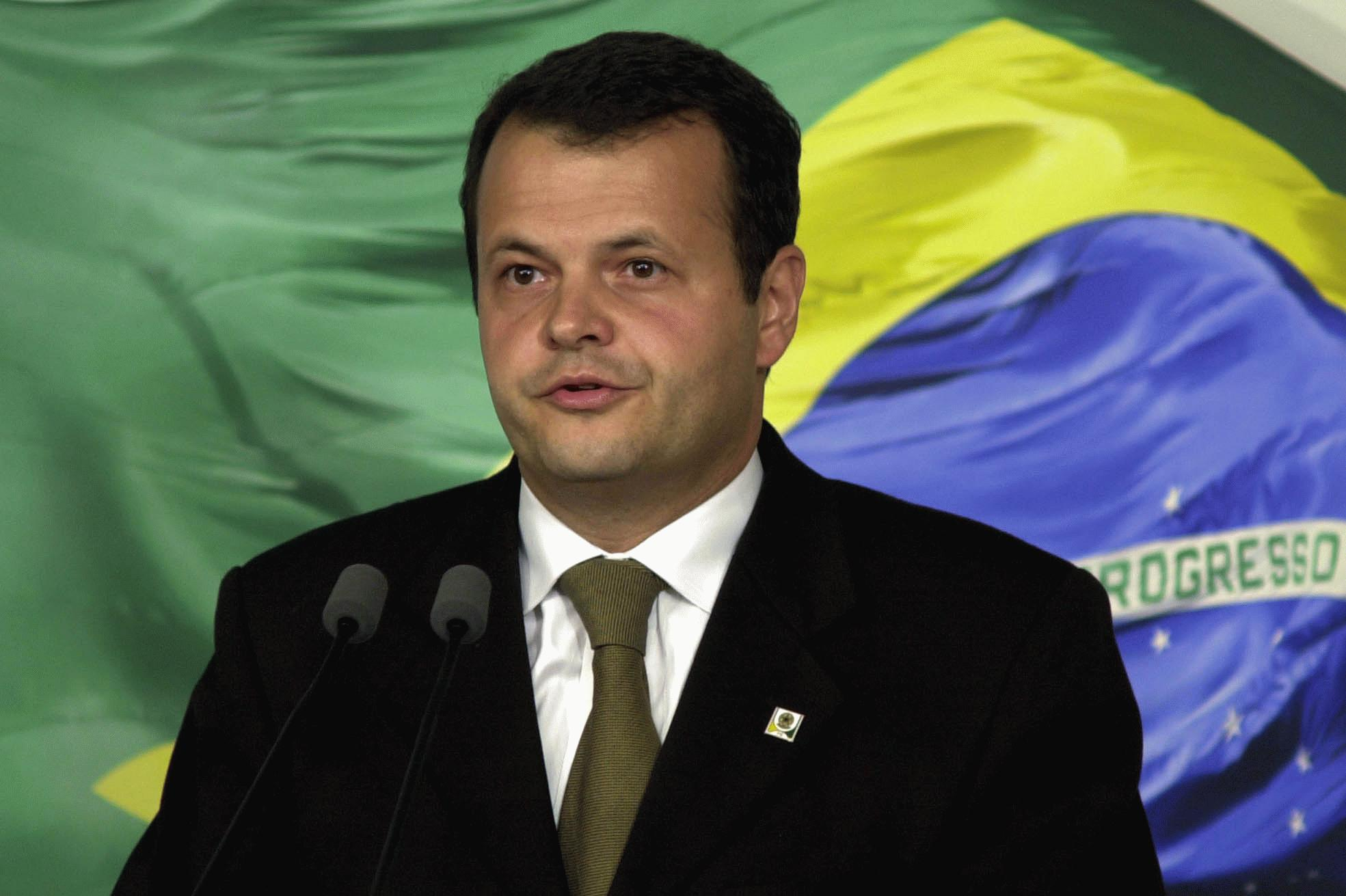
Rodrigo Baena (2011–2012)

The Press Office is responsible for providing support and information to the national and international media regarding the President's beliefs, activities and actions. It works alongside the Secretariat of Social Communications in crafting and espousing the administration's message. It coordinates accreditation, access and flow of media professionals to the events that have the participation of President.

It also articulates with other government agencies' press offices, the dissemination of programs, policies, acts, events, ceremonies and trips in which the President participates and provides journalistic and administrative support to the Palácio do Planalto press unit.

== List of spokespeople ==
Year(s)	Spokesperson	President
1969-1974	Carlos Fehlberg	Emílio Garrastazu Médici
1979-1980	Alexandre Garcia	João Figueiredo
1981-1985	Carlos Átila	João Figueiredo
1985	Antônio Britto	Tancredo Neves
1985-1989	Fernando Cesar	José Sarney
1988-1990	Carlos Henrique	José Sarney
1990-1992	Cláudio Humberto	Fernando Collor de Mello
1992	Etevaldo Dias	Fernando Collor de Mello
1992-1995	Francisco Baker	Itamar Franco
1995-1999	Sérgio Amaral	Fernando Henrique Cardoso
1999-2003	Georges Lamazière	Fernando Henrique Cardoso
2003-2007	André Singer	Luiz Inácio Lula da Silva
2007-2011	Marcelo Baumbach	Luiz Inácio Lula da Silva
2011-2012	Rodrigo Baena Soares	Dilma Rousseff
2012-2015	Thomas Traumann	Dilma Rousseff
2015-2016	Carlos Villanova	Dilma Rousseff
2016-2019	Alexandre Parola	Michel Temer
2019-2020	Otávio Rêgo Barros	Jair Bolsonaro
