= Samba de breque =

Subgenre of samba

- Stylistic origins: Samba
- Cultural origins: Early 1940s in Rio de Janeiro, Brazil

Samba de breque is a subgenre of samba that emerged in Rio de Janeiro between the late 1930s and early 1940s.

The main characteristic of the subgenre is "breque", a Brazilian term for "brake". In other words, it is a samba with sudden stops, usually of a humorous character, in which the singer makes spoken comments.

The singer Moreira da Silva consolidated himself as the great name of this style of samba. The first success of the subgenre was "Acertei no milhar", a samba by Wilson Batista and Geraldo Pereira.

== Sources ==
- Marcondes, Marcos Antônio, ed. (1977). Enciclopédia da música brasileira - erudita, folclórica e popular (in Brazilian Portuguese). Vol. 2 (1ª ed.). São Paulo: Art Ed.
- Lopes, Nei; Simas, Luiz Antonio (2015). Dicionário da História Social do Samba (in Brazilian Portuguese) (2ª ed.). Rio de Janeiro: Civilização Brasileira.
- Portes, Isabelle dos Santos (2014). "O Último Malandro" em síncope: Imaginação social, malandro e cidadania nas canções de Moreira da Silva (1930-1945, 1951-1954) (Master) (in Brazilian Portuguese). Rio de Janeiro: Federal University of Rio de Janeiro.
- Tatit, Luiz (2000-06-07). ""Kid Morengueira" gostava de atirar na bossa nova" (in Brazilian Portuguese). Folha de S.Paulo.
