= Tiro ao Álvaro =

Single by Elis Regina; Demônios da Garoa
- Written: 1960
- Genre: Samba
- Label: Odeon Records
- Songwriters: Adoniran Barbosa; Osvaldo Moles

"Tiro ao Álvaro" is a samba song composed in 1960 by Brazilian composer and singer Adoniran Barbosa (real name João Rubinato) with the radio-journalist Osvaldo Moles. In his style of the "paulista" samba, it has humorous lyrics written in a popular Portuguese language.

== History ==
The title of the song refers to the sport of bullseye shooting, which in Brazil is called "tiro ao alvo". During the military dictatorship, an opponent of the regime was called “alvo” (target). Barbosa, hoping not to be censored, changed the term to the common first name Álvaro, which has a perfect assonance with “alvo”.

The song was also censored under the pretext of a "...text in bad taste...", because it altered certain words with the use of the Paulista accent: "flechada" (arrow) with "frechada", "tábua" (plate) with “táubua”, “automóvel” (automobile) with “automorver” and “revólver” with “revorver”.

An attempt at publication took place in 1973, but it was not successful until 1980 with the version performed by Elis Regina.

== Others versions ==
- 1990 — Demônios da Garoa
- 2007 — Diogo Nogueira
- 2010 — Zélia Duncan
- 2016 — Péricles (for the theme of the telenovela "Haja Coração")

== See also ==
- Trem das Onze
- Samba Italiano
- Samba do Arnesto
- Joga a chave
