= Band expander =

An FM band expander (band converter, FM converter) is a device used on Japanese car stereo systems to enable them to receive international FM frequencies, when used or grey import Japanese cars are shipped to other markets. Japanese radio bands are between 76 and 90 MHz whereas the international broadcast plan is between 87.5 and 108 MHz. The unit itself is connected inline between the radio and the antenna, and it downshifts the frequency of the broadcast by a predetermined amount (generally between 10 and 14 MHz).

== Power ==
FMBE is powered from the ACC line that is also connected to the stereo unit so it is only operational when the radio is active. Because the Japanese broadcast band width has a narrower range than the international standard, the unit may have to downshift the same frequencies by 10 and 20 MHz simultaneously. This is to ensure both 'sets' of frequencies get included in the reduced bandwidth, but it can mean that some stations can become doubled up.
