= Edino Krieger =

Brazilian composer and musical critic (1928–2022)

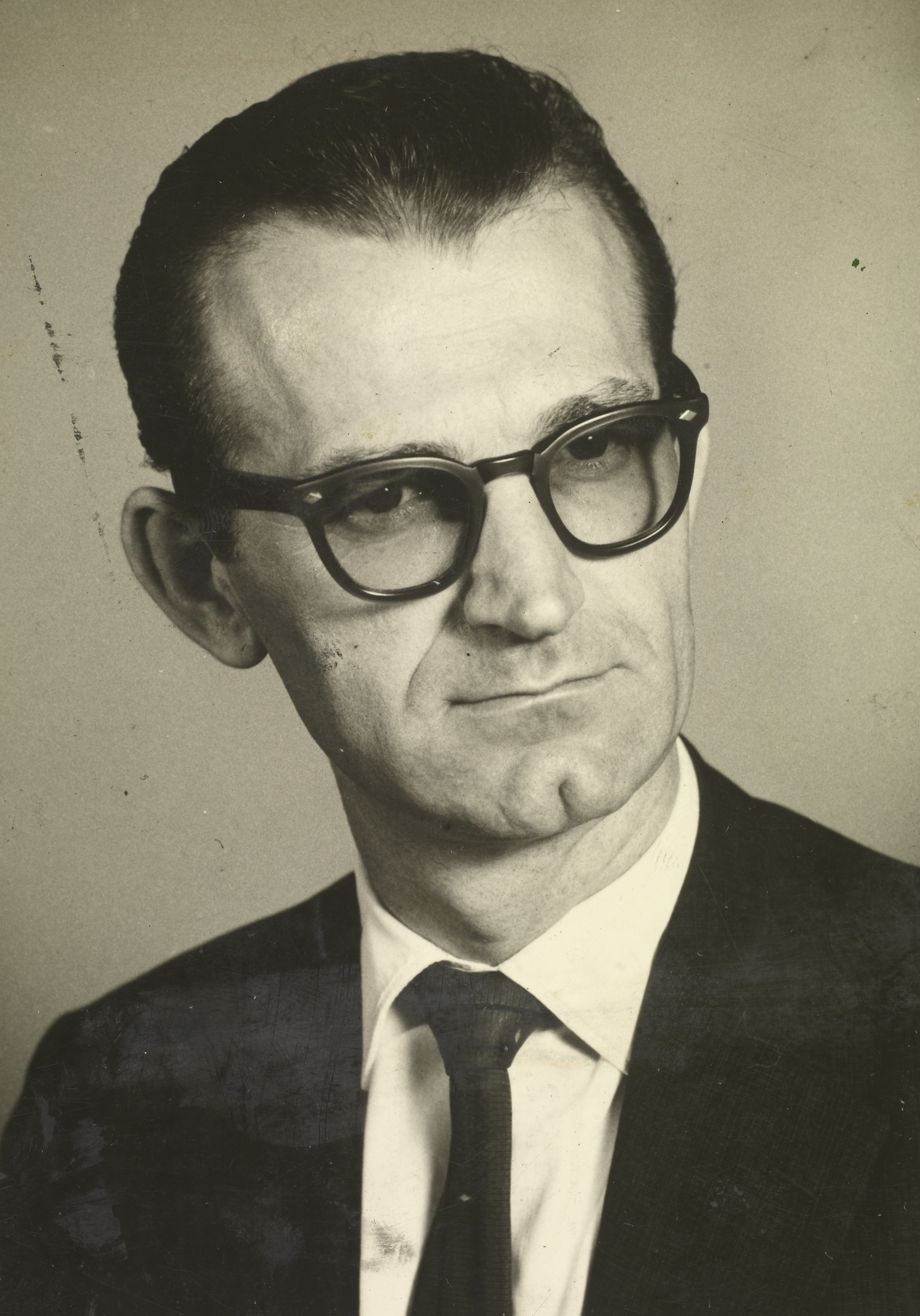
- Krieger in 1972
- Born: 17 March 1928; Brusque, Santa Catarina, Brazil
- Died: 6 December 2022 (aged 94); Rio de Janeiro, Brazil

Edino Krieger (17 March 1928 – 6 December 2022) was a Brazilian avant-garde composer, conductor, record producer and musical critic.

== Life and career ==
Born in Brusque, Santa Catarina, the son of the composer and band leader Aldo Krieger, he studied at the Conservatório Brasileiro de Música in Rio de Janeiro.

During his career Krieger composed over 150 pieces, as well as songs (notably Vinicius de Moraes' "Fuga e antifuga"), incidental music and film scores. Among his best known works, it is the 1972 suite "Canticum Naturale", in which orchestra recreates Amazonian natural sounds. He served as director of Rádio MEC and as a musical critic for the newspaper Jornal do Brasil and the journal Tribuna da Imprensa, as well as president of several cultural institutions, including the Museu da Imagem e do Som do Rio de Janeiro.

== Death ==
Krieger died on 6 December 2022, at the age of 94.
