= Kilza Setti =

Brazilian ethnomusicologist & composer (born 1932)

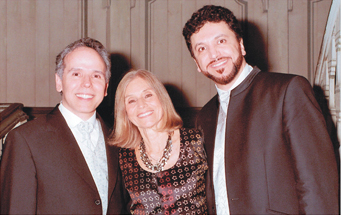
Kilza Setti sided by Maximiliano de Brito and Renato Mismetti

Kilza Setti de Castro Lima (born 26 January 1932) is a Brazilian ethnomusicologist, composer, and pianist.

== Biography ==
Kilza Setti was born in São Paulo, Brazil. She started her studies on piano with Leonilda Morganti and at the age of 8 she started piano classes with Fructuoso Vianna. In 1953 she graduated from the Conservatório Dramático e Musical de São Paulo where she studied composition with Camargo Guarnieri, and won scholarships for study in composition and research in ethnomusic at the Torcuato di Tella Institute in Buenos Aires. She also earned a scholarship to the Calouste Gulbenkian Foundation in Lisbon, Portugal, where she studied under anthropologist Michel Giacometti and composer Fernando Lopes-Graça.

Setti graduated from the University of São Paulo in 1982 with a doctorate degree in social anthropology. She studied the music of the European- and Indigenous-born fishermen on the southeastern coast of Brazil and the ritual music of the Mbya Guarani and Timbira Indians of Central Brazil, and founded the Brazilian Association of Folklore.

Setti received awards for her compositions, including first prize in the composition competitions. She is a visiting professor at the Federal University of Bahia and other universities.

In 1999 Kilza's musical work was subject to two researches: a doctoral thesis in the University of Boston, USA, by cellist Darylin Manring; and a master's dissertation in the State University of Campinas (Unicamp), by pianist Nancy Bueno.

== Works ==
Kilza Setti is influenced by her study of folkloric music and composes for orchestra, chamber ensemble, solo instrument and voice. Selected works include:

- 1958 Dois Corais mistos: Obialá Koro Yemanjá Oto
- 1959 Balada do Rei das Sereias
- 1973 Poesia II
- 1982 Canoa em dois tempos
- 1982 Ser
- 1982 Memória
- 1962 Lenda do céu
- 1972 Lundu
- 1973 Jogo da Condessa
- 1990 Missa Caiçara
- 1955 Toada for piano
- 1958 Seis Peças em clave de Sol for piano
- 1972 Dois momentos for recorder
- 1958 Toada for orchestra
- 1961 Suíte for string orchestra, piccolo, flute, clarinet
- 1966 Folgança suite for orchestra
- 1999 Meditação sobre o Tietê

Her works have been recorded and issued on CD. She is the author of a book titled Voices of the Green Hell - Disenchanted Amazonia, 2003, ISBN 978-3-00-012238-5.
