= Samba-choro =

- Stylistic origins: Samba; Choro
- Cultural origins: Early 1930s in Rio de Janeiro, Brazil
- Typical instruments: Flute; trumpet; cavaquinho; classical guitar; pandeiro

Samba-choro is a subgenre of samba that emerged in Rio de Janeiro in early 1930s in Brazil. It was a syncopated hybrid fusion of samba with the Brazilian instrumental genre choro, but with medium tempo and presence of lyrics.

Created by the Brazilian music industry, samba-choro was released with "Amor em Excess", by Gadé and Valfrido Silva, in 1932. One of the most popular songs of this subgenre is "Carinhoso", by Pixinguinha. Originally released as choro in 1917, this composition received lyrics and ended up relaunched two decades later, in the voice of Orlando Silva, with great commercial success. In the following decade, the cavaquinista Waldir Azevedo would popularize chorinho, a kind of fast-paced instrumental samba.

== Sources ==
- Marcondes, Marcos Antônio, ed. (1977). Enciclopédia da música brasileira – erudita, folclórica e popular (in Brazilian Portuguese). Vol. 2 (1ª ed.). São Paulo: Art Ed.
- Lopes, Nei (29 May 2020). "O amplo e diversificado universo do samba". In Stroeter, Guga; Mori, Elisa (eds.). Uma árvore da música brasileira (in Brazilian Portuguese). São Paulo: Sesc (published 2019). ISBN 9788594932181.
- Lopes, Nei; Simas, Luiz Antonio (2015). Dicionário da História Social do Samba (in Brazilian Portuguese) (2ª ed.). Rio de Janeiro: Civilização Brasileira.
- Silva, Rodrigo José Brasil (2012). Mediações culturais, identidade nacional e samba na Revista da Música Popular (1954–1956) (PDF) (Master) (in Brazilian Portuguese). Florianópolis: Federal University of Santa Catarina.
