= Rádio Nacional =

Brazilian public radio network

- Type: Public broadcasting
- Country: Brazil
- Founded: 1936
- Headquarters: Brasília and Rio de Janeiro
- Owner: Brazilian federal government
- Parent: Empresa Brasil de Comunicação
- Official website: radios.ebc.com.br

Rádio Nacional (National Radio) is a Brazilian radio network belonging to the government-owned corporation EBC (Empresa Brasil de Comunicação, Brazil Communication Company), formerly known as Radiobrás.

== History ==
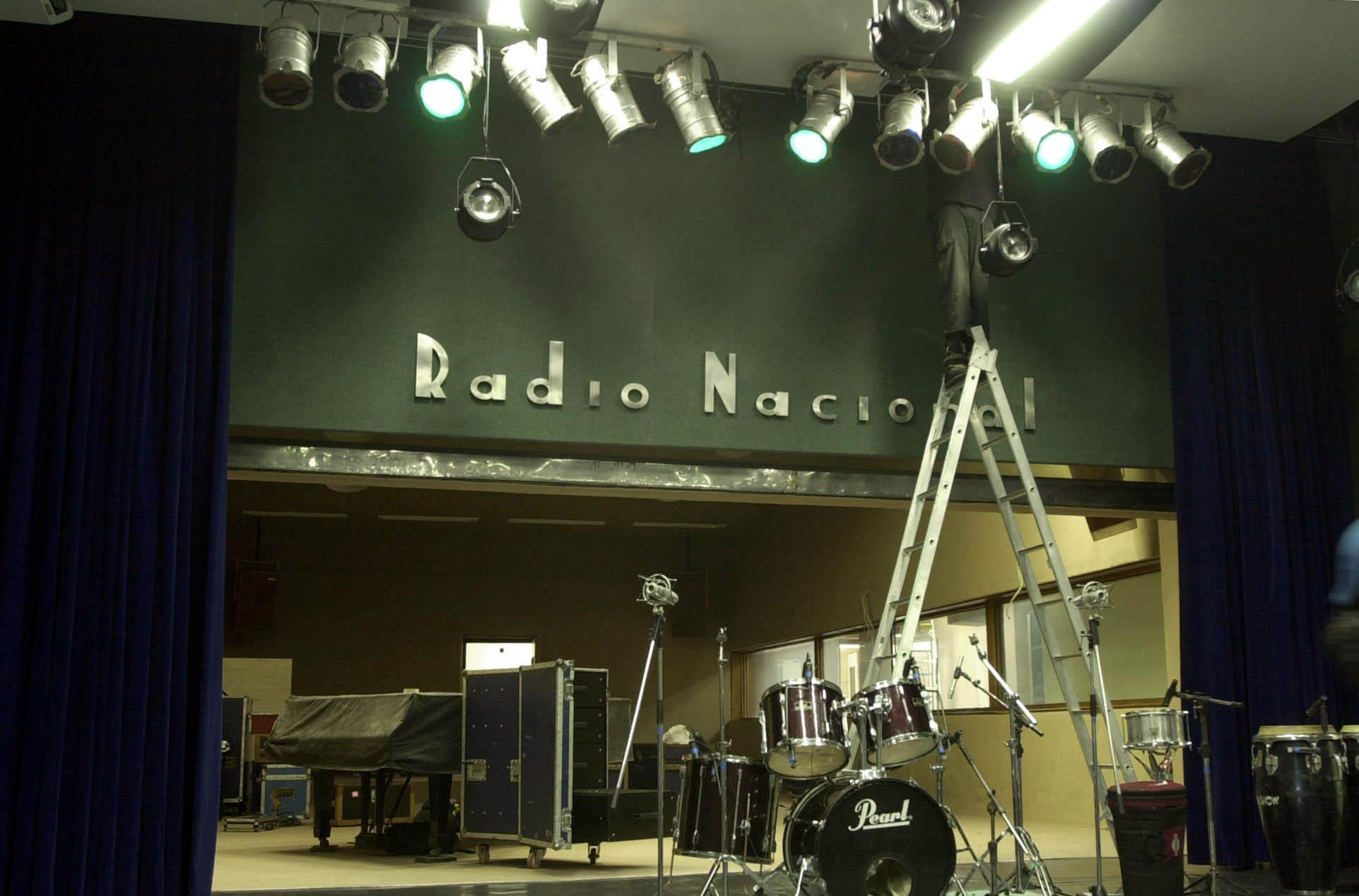
The Radamés Gnatalli Auditorium in Rio de Janeiro, which belongs to Rádio Nacional.

The Brazilian system of public radio began to be assembled from the nationalization of the Rádio Nacional, a Rio de Janeiro-based station in 1936, by President Getúlio Vargas. In 1958, two years before the inauguration of new capital Brasília, Rádio Nacional Brasília was founded, and in 1976 the FM version, Nacional FM was assembled in the same city. In 1977, the shortwave service Rádio Nacional da Amazônia was created, covering much of Brazil with the aim of showing the Amazon culture to the rest of the country. In 2006, Nacional launched the Radio Nacional do Alto Solimões, covering municipalities of the Alto Solimões region of Amazonas state.

For a long time, football matches were primarily broadcast on Rádio Nacional. The station was dominant at a time when there were no range restrictions for medium-wave broadcasts. Today, medium-wave transmitters are limited to a radius of 400 kilometers. In its heyday, Rádio Nacional reached 40 percent of Brazilian territory. Rádio Nacional was so influential that there are still many fans of football clubs from Rio de Janeiro in northeastern Brazil.

On 7 May 2021, five EBC transmitters on 87.1 FM—four of them for Rádio Nacional—were among the 10 charter stations to operate in the FM extended band in Brazil. The new stations filled some of Rádio Nacional's largest coverage gaps, bringing the station to Rio de Janeiro, Belo Horizonte, Recife and São Paulo.

== Rádio MEC ==
In 1936, Rádio Sociedade do Rio de Janeiro was donated to the Brazilian government and renamed Rádio Ministério da Educação e Cultura (Ministry of Education and Culture Radio) or simply Rádio MEC. Later, the acronym was changed to Rádio Música, Educação e Cultura (Music, Education and Culture Radio). In 2008, the three stations of Rádio MEC were incorporated to the EBC radio networks, along with Rádio Nacional stations.

== Rádio Nacional-owned stations ==
=== Brazilian Federal District ===
- Rádio Nacional AM Brasília (980 kHz) - Generalist station with speech-based programming, news, popular music and service to the Brasilia region.
- Rádio Nacional FM Brasília (96.1 MHz) - Musical programming concentration on MPB, samba, instrumental, local artists and world music.
- Rádio Nacional da Amazônia (SW 11780 kHz and 6180 kHz) - Speech programming, news, music, radio drama and service to the Amazon region.

=== State of Minas Gerais ===
- Rádio Nacional Belo Horizonte (eFM 87.1 MHz)

=== State of Pernambuco ===
- Rádio Nacional Recife (eFM 87.1 MHz)

=== State of Rio de Janeiro ===
- Rádio Nacional do Rio de Janeiro (AM 1130 kHz and eFM 87.1 MHz) - Generalist station with speech-based programming, news, sports and popular music.

=== State of São Paulo ===
- Rádio Nacional São Paulo (eFM 87.1 MHz)

=== State of Amazonas ===
- Rádio Nacional do Alto Solimões (AM 670 kHz and FM 96.1 MHz - Tabatinga region) - Seven daily hours with news, music, local culture and service to the Alto Solimões region, in network with Nacional da Amazônia for the rest of the day.

== Rádio MEC owned stations ==
=== Brazilian Federal District ===
- Rádio MEC AM Brasília (800 kHz and eFM 87.1 MHz) - In network with MEC FM Rio de Janeiro.

=== State of Rio de Janeiro ===
- Rádio MEC AM Rio de Janeiro (800 kHz) - Musical programming with MPB, choro, bossa nova and instrumental music.
- Rádio MEC FM Rio de Janeiro (98.9 MHz) - Classical music and news.
