= Demônios da Garoa =

Brazilian samba band

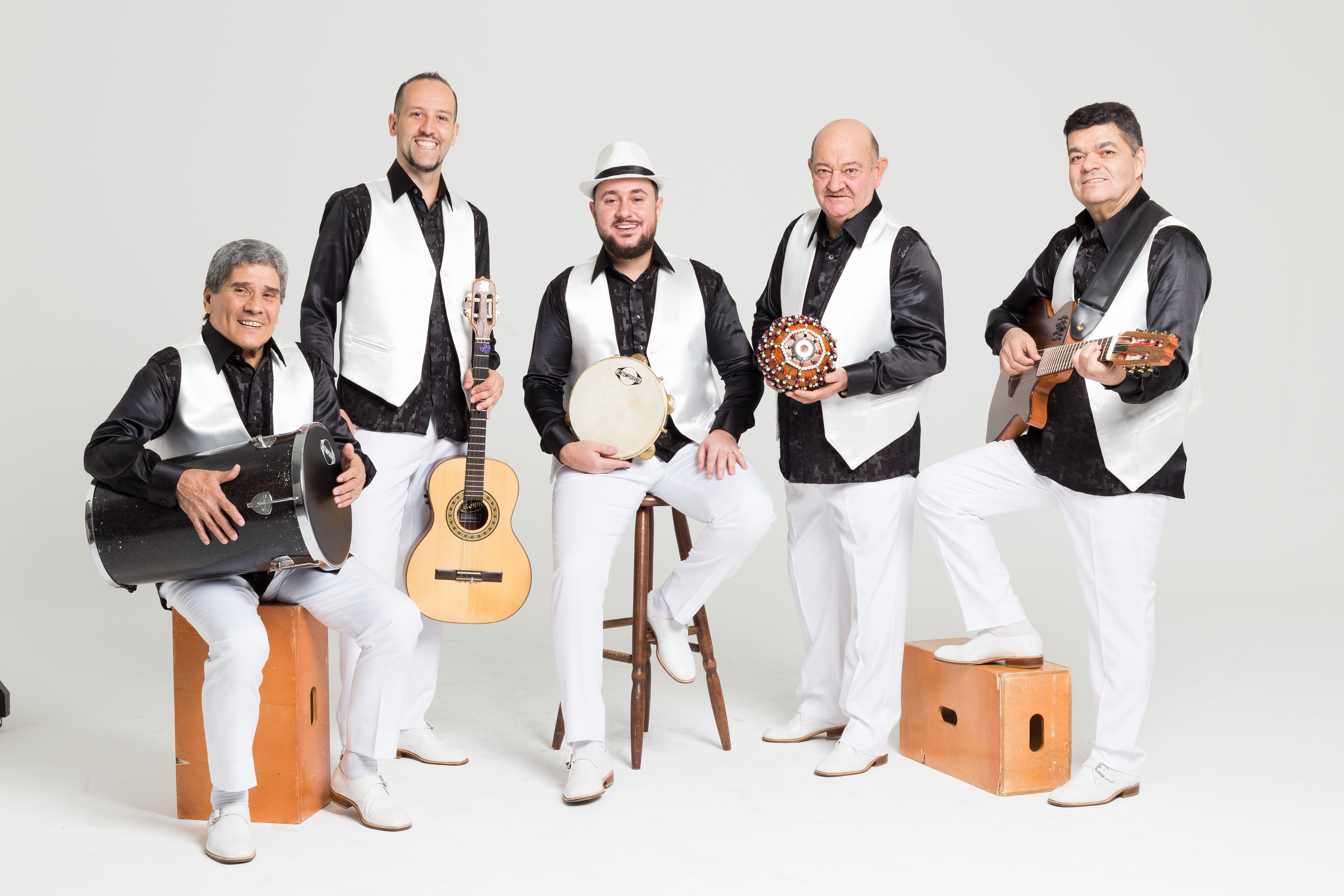
- 2020 lineup of the Demônios da Garoa.

Background information
- Origin: São Paulo, Brazil
- Genre: Samba
- Years active: 1943 — present
- Labels: Continental, Band Music, Radar Records
- Members: Sérgio Rosa; Ricardo Rosa (Ricardinho); Dedé Paraizo; Izael Caldeira da Silva; Everson Pessoa
- Website: www.demoniosdagaroa.com.br

Demônios da Garoa is a Brazilian samba band. It was formed in São Paulo in 1943, its members drawing influences from a variety of cultural sources to develop their own characteristic style. In 1949, they met Adoniran Barbosa, one of the most important composers of música popular brasileira or MPB. Together, they personified current socio-cultural trends. In 1994, it was recognized as the oldest performing group in Brazil by Guinness World Records.

== History ==
The band was founded by Arnaldo Rosa and Antonio Gomes Neto (Toninho), began as the "Grupo do Luar" in São Paulo. In 1943, singing for the first time on radio, he won a talent contest on Rádio Bandeirantes entitled A Hora da Bomba. The main prize was a contract for two weekly radio shows. The group changed its name at the initiative of the radio announcer Vicente Leporace, an early supporter. He ran a contest to choose the name of the group and an unidentified listener suggested the name "Demônios da Garoa". Leporace, when announcing the band on his program, used to call them "devils from the Moonlight Group".

In 1949, during the recording of the soundtrack for the film O Cangaceiro, members of Demônios da Garoa met composer Adoniran Barbosa. The resulting partnership yielded the band's main hits as well as national recognition in Brazil. Barbosa's good humor became the trademark of the group. In 1964, after changes in the original lineup, he recorded "Trem das Onze", which became a well-known song, particularly in São Paulo. Other hits included "Iracema", "Saudosa Maloca", "O Samba do Arnesto", "As Mariposas", "Tiro ao Álvaro", "Ói Nóis Aqui Trá Veiz", "Vila Esperança" and "Vai no Bexiga pra Ver".

"Demônios da Garoa" has sold more than ten million records - 69 singles, 34 LPs and 13 CDs. In 1994, it entered the Guinness Book - Brazilian Record Book as the "Oldest Vocal Ensemble of Brazil in Activity".

The last two original members of the group, Arnaldo Rosa and Toninho Gomes, died in 2000 and 2005 respectively. Rosa succumbed to liver cirrhosis due to spinal treatment, while Gomes died of complications from diabetes and Alzheimer's disease. In 2021, Izael Caldeira da Silva died of the COVID-19 virus.

The current lineup of "Demônios da Garoa" consists of Sérgio Rosa (son of Arnaldo Rosa), Ricardo Rosa (Ricardinho), Dedé Paraizo and Everson Pessoa. The group, which used to perform only with its own members, now has a supporting band consisting of drums, 6-string guitar, contrabass, percussion, cavaquinho and piano.

== Partial Discography ==
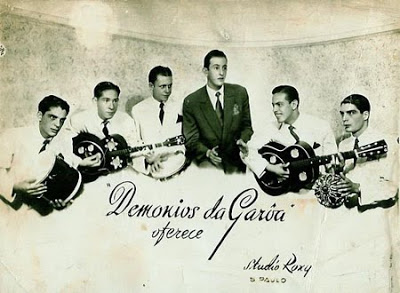
The group in the early 1940s.

- 55 Anos de Garoa (1997)
- Demônios da Garoa Hoje (1995)
- 50 Anos (1994)
- Esses Divinos Demônios da Garoa (1990)
- O Samba Continua (1980)
- 34 Anos de Música Brasileira (1977)
- Samba do Metrô (1975)
- Torre de Babel (1974)
- Abre a Gira (1973)
- Eu Sou de Lá (1972)
- Agüenta a Mão, João (1971)
- Sai de Mim, Saudade (1971)
- Doido Varrido (1969)
- Ói Nóis Aqui Tra Veis (1969)
- É De Samba Vol. 2 (1968)
- É De Samba (1968)
- Leva Este (1968)
- Eu Vou Pro Samba (1965)
- Trem das 11 (1964)
- Mas Demônios Que Nunca (1962, Argentina)
- Demônios Em Sambas Infernais (1961)
- Pafunça (1958)
- Demônios da Garoa (1957)
- Saudosa Maloca (1957)
