= Moreira da Silva =

Brazilian samba singer and songwriter

- Also known as: Kid Morengueira
- Born: 1 April 1902; Rio de Janeiro, Brazil
- Died: 6 June 2000 (aged 98) Rio de Janeiro, Brazil
- Genres: Samba
- Years active: 1931-?

Antônio Moreira da Silva (1 April 1902, in Rio de Janeiro – 6 June 2000, in Rio de Janeiro) was a Brazilian singer and songwriter of Samba, also known by his nickname Kid Morengueira.

== Biography ==
He was the older son of Bernardino de Sousa Paranhos, trombone player for the Rio de Janeiro Military Police (PMERJ), and Miss Pauladina de Assis Moreira.

Born in Rio de Janeiro, in the Morro do Salgueiro district, he only began to study at nine years-old, but soon left school in favor of music (after the death of his father).

During his career, at the same time when he seriously started performing, songwriting and singing, he worked as factory employee, cab driver and ambulance driver.

Reputed as the creator of the samba-de-breque (brake-Samba), Moreira da Silva started his artistic career in 1931, with "Ererê and Rei da Umbanda". For the 1992 Rio de Janeiro carnival, this song was elected to be the theme of the Unidos de Manguinhos samba school parade. In 1995, at the age of 93 years, he recorded the album Os 3 Malandros in Concert with two other samba songwriters and singers: Dicró and Bezerra da Silva.

Even in his last years, Moreira da Silva continued to perform with some regularity on live shows and recording seasons.

Moreira da Silva died in 2000, at the age of 98 years, in the city of Rio de Janeiro.

== Select albums ==
- Implorar ("To Beg") - 1935
- Jogo Proibido ("Forbidden Game") - 1937
- Acertei no Milhar ("I Hit in the Lottery") - 1940
- Amigo Urso ("Friend Bear")
- Fui à Paris ("I Gone to Paris")
- Na Subida do Morro ("Uphill in the Favela")
- O Rei do Gatilho ("Trigger King") - 1962
- O Último dos Moicanos ("The Last of the Mohicans") - 1963
