= Marlos Nobre =

Brazilian composer (1939–2024)

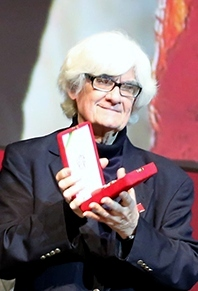
- Nobre receiving the Ordem do Mérito Cultural in 2013

Background information
- Born: February 18, 1939
- Origin: Recife, Pernambuco, Brazil
- Died: December 2, 2024 (aged 85) Rio de Janeiro, Brazil
- Genre: Classical
- Occupations: Conductor, composer, pianist
- Years active: 1948–2024

Marlos Nobre (February 18, 1939 – December 2, 2024) was a Brazilian composer. He received commissions from numerous institutions, including the Ministry of Culture in Spain, the Free University of Music of São Paulo, the Neuchâtel Chamber Orchestra in Switzerland, The Apollon Foundation in Bremen, Germany and the Maracaibo Music Festival in Venezuela. He also sat on the juries of numerous international music competitions, including the Città di Alessandria Prize, the Arthur Rubinstein Piano Master Competition and the Paloma O'Shea Santander International Piano Competition.

His eclectic compositional style featured a mixture of classical compositional techniques such as polytonality, atonality and serialism combined with stylistic and conceptual influences from Brazilian traditional and popular music. His diverse approach to composition was enhanced through his studies of prominent composers, including Koellreutter, Guarnieri, Ginastera, Messiaen, Dallapiccola, and Bernstein.

== Early life and education ==
Nobre was born on February 18, 1939. He studied piano and music theory at the Conservatory of Music of Pernambuco from 1948 to 1959, and composition with H. J. Koellreutter and Camargo Guarnieri. When he received a scholarship from the Rockefeller Foundation, he pursued advanced studies at the Latin American Center in Buenos Aires, alongside Ginastera, Messiaen, Malipiero, Copland and Dallapiccola. He worked also with Alexander Goehr and Gunther Schuller at the Berkshire Music Center in Tanglewood in 1969, where he met Leonard Bernstein. The same year he studied electronic music at the Columbia-Princeton Electronic Music Center in New York.

== Career highlights ==
Nobre was composer-in-residence at the Brahms-Haus in Baden-Baden invited by the Brahms Society, Germany from 1980 to 1981. He held the Guggenheim Fellowship in 1985–86.

Nobre was a visiting professor at Yale, the Universities of Indiana, Arizona and Oklahoma and the Juilliard School. He was Music Director of the Radio MEC and the National Symphony Orchestra from 1971 to 1976, the First Director of the National Institute of Music at FUNARTE from 1976 to 1979, and the President of the Brazilian Academy of Music. He was also President of the International Music Council of UNESCO.

He was Guest Composer at the University of Georgia and Texas Christian University. In 2000, he received the highest academic awards from the Texas Christian University the "Cecil and Ida Green Honors Professor" and from the Indiana University the "Thomas Hart Benton Medallion".

=== Compositions ===
The Desafio No. 3 for violin and strings is among 16 compositions by Nobre for various combinations of instruments that draw on the concept of the "desafio". In Brazilian culture, a "desafio" is a musical duel between two singers known as repentistas sertanejos (lit. country singers) who playfully and competitively alternate improvised poetic lyrics while accompanying themselves on guitar. The "desafio" tradition is particularly common in the Brazilian northeast and typically takes place at a public square or local market. Desafio No. 3 is a dialogue between the violin soloist and string orchestra, ant the piece reflects the modal, lyrical, and conversational nature of the music of the Brazilian repentistas.

== Later life and death ==
Nobre was active as a pianist and conductor, having performed and conducted with several orchestras: Suisse Romande Orchestra, Geneve; Collegium Academicum, Switzerland; Buenos Aires Philharmonic Orchestra at Teatro Colón; SODRE Orchestra of Montevideo, Uruguay; the National Orchestras of Portugal, Spain, Mexico, Venezuela, Peru (National Symphony Orchestra of Peru), Guatemala and all Brazilian Orchestra; the Royal Philharmonic Orchestra, London; Philharmonic of Nice, France.

Nobre was later the Director of Contemporary Music Programs at Radio MEC-FM of Brazil; the President of "Jeunesses Musicales" of Brazil and the President of the Musica Nova Editions of Brazil. Miembro de Número del Colegio de Compositores Latinoamericanos de Música de Arte, fundado por el compositor y director de orquesta Manuel de Elías.

Nobre died in Rio de Janeiro on December 2, 2024, at the age of 85.

== Awards ==
Nobre won a number of composers' competitions, including:

- Music and Musicians of Brazil, Rio de Janeiro (1960)
- Broadcasting Music Inc. Award, New York, US (1961)
- The Brazilian Song Contest, Rio de Janeiro (1962)
- Ernesto Nazareth National Competition, Brazilian Academy of Music, Rio de Janeiro (1963)
- National Composers Contest, Federal University of Rio de Janeiro (1963)
- Torcuato Di Tella Award, Buenos Aires (1963)
- City of Santos Contest, São Paulo (1966)
- The UNESCO Prize, Paris (1974)
- The I TRIMALCA/UNESCO Prize, Colombia (1979)
- VI Premio Iberoamerican de la Música "Tomás Luís de Victoria", (2005)

He received the following decorations:

- Cultural Merit Gold Medal of Pernambuco (1978)
- Great Official of the Order of Merit of Brasília (1988)
- Official of the Order of Rio Branco of the Itamaraty, Brazil (1989)
- Official of the Order of Arts and Letters of France (1994)
- Gold Medal of Merit of the Joaquim Nabuco Foundation of Pernambuco (1999)
