= Empresa Brasil de Comunicação =

Brazilian public broadcasting company

Empresa Brasil de Comunicação S/A
- Type: Sociedade Anônima
- Industry: Public broadcasting
- Founded: Brasília, Brazil (October 25, 2007; 18 years ago)
- Headquarters: Brasília, Brazil
- Area served: Brazil
- Key people: André Basbaum (President Director)
- Services: News agency; Radio stations; Television stations; MediaWeb
- Number of employees: 1,844 (as of August 2021)
- Subsidiaries: TV Brasil; Rádio Nacional; Agência Brasil
- Website: ebc.com.br

The Empresa Brasil de Comunicação (EBC; Brazil Communication Company) is a Brazilian federal public media conglomerate. It was established on October 24, 2007, to provide public broadcasting services and manage federal television and several public radio stations, as well as communication services such as a public news agency and the EBC Portal.

The EBC includes the TV Brasil (a television station network), the Agência Brasil (the news agency), the Portal EBC (the news portal), the EBC Serviços (a division that produces A Voz do Brasil radio program for the Secretariat of Government of the Presidency of the Republic) and the National Radio Network (Rádio MEC AM, Rádio MEC FM, Rádio Nacional do Alto Solimões, Rádio Nacional da Amazônia, Rádio Nacional de Brasília AM, Rádio Nacional de Brasília FM, Rádio Nacional do Rio de Janeiro, among others).

== History ==
The EBC was created by the Brazilian government on 24 October 2007, when Federal Decree No. 6,246 was published in the Diário Oficial da União. Its establishment had been authorized on 10 October 2007 by Provisional Measure No. 398, later converted into Federal Law No. 11,652 of 7 April 2008. The company's bylaws were approved on 10 December 2008 through Federal Decree No. 6,689.

The company was formed by bringing together the assets and staff of Empresa Brasileira de Comunicação, known as Radiobrás, and federal public assets that had been under the responsibility of the Associação de Comunicação Educativa Roquette Pinto (ACERP), which also coordinated TVE Brasil. A new management contract was signed between the federal government and ACERP, which became a service provider to EBC. The new company also took over the broadcasting concessions previously held by Radiobrás.

EBC was placed under the Secretariat of Social Communication of the Presidency, known as SECOM. Its headquarters are in Brasília, while production centres and regional offices operate in different parts of Brazil. The company was created to manage public broadcasting services under the federal executive branch, with responsibility for programming and content distribution across television, radio and digital platforms. Its programming includes educational, artistic, cultural, scientific and technological content, and also includes regional, national and independent productions.

EBC is structured as a closed-capital corporation, represented by shares. The federal government is its sole shareholder, although entities belonging to the indirect federal, state or municipal administration may hold up to 49 percent of its social capital. Its financing comes from the federal budget, as well as from licensing, programme production, institutional advertising and services provided to public and private institutions.

As with other Brazilian public companies, EBC is subject to external oversight by the Internal Control Secretariat of the Presidency and by the Federal Court of Auditors.

In 2016, EBC's then director-president, Ricardo Melo, was dismissed by Acting President Michel Temer. Melo appealed to the Supreme Federal Court, arguing that the law that created EBC provided for a four-year term for the director-president and that, for that reason, he could not be removed before the end of the term. In June 2016, Justice Dias Toffoli granted a preliminary injunction ordering Melo's return to the position. On 8 September 2016, however, Toffoli revoked that decision and ruled that Laerte Rímoli could remain as director-president.

In 2020, Glen Lopes was appointed director-president of EBC by President Jair Bolsonaro.

In 2025, President Luiz Inácio Lula da Silva appointed André Basbaum as EBC's director-president.
