= Patrício Teixeira =

Brazilian singer and guitar player

- Born: 17 March 1893; Rio de Janeiro, Empire of Brazil
- Died: 9 October 1972 (aged 79); Rio de Janeiro, Brazil
- Occupations: Singer, guitarist, composer
- Years active: 1918–1972

Patricio Teixeira (17 March 1893 – 9 October 1972) was a Brazilian singer, guitarist, and composer.

== Biography ==
Teixeira was born on 17 March 1893 in Rio de Janeiro. He was born at Praça Onze and did not know his parents. He began his career singing serenades and playing guitar in Vila Isabel and at Praça Onze. He gained popularity for his performances on radio, including recordings and presentations, having specialized in the repertoire of Brazilian folkloric songs. He worked with choro songs, among others, and had as musical partners Pixinguinha, Donga, João Pernambuco, and Catulo da Paixão Cearense.

In 1918, he made his first professional appearance at the Clube de Xadrez in Petrópolis. Starting in the 1920s, he recording with labels Odeon, Parlophon, Columbia, and Victor. With his appearances, he was a pioneer of radio performances in Brazil, participating a singer initially on Rádio Clube do Brasil, going through radio stations such as Guanabara, Cajuti, Sociedade, Mayrink Veiga, and others. He spent 30 years playing on radio. He recorded various albums interpreting waltzes, modinhas, lundus, and sambas, along with playing other genres.

He worked with Pixinguinah, Donga, and the Oito Batutas, and released various successes in the 1920s and 1930s, including "Casinha Pequenina", "Trepa no Coqueiro" (Ari Kerner), "Gavião Calçudo" (Pixinguinha), "Xoxô" (Luperce Miranda), "Cabide de Molambo" (João da Baiana), and "Sete Horas da Manhã" (Ciro de Souza). One of his successes, "Não tenho lágrimas", is in the soundtrack for Martin Scorsese's "Raging Bull", starring Robert De Niro.

He also was famous for being a teacher of the guitar and singing. Some of his students included Aurora Miranda, Linda Batista, sisters Danuza and Nara Leão, and actress Maria Lúcia Dahl.

== Biggest successes ==
- Gavião Calçudo (Pixinguinha and Cícero de Almeida), 1929;
- Xo-xo (Luperce Miranda) as a duet with Francisco Alves, 1930;
- Samba de fato (Pixinguinha and Cícero de Almeida) 1932;
- Perdi minha mascote (João da Baiana), as a duet with Carmen Miranda, 1933;
- Sabor do samba (Kid Pepe and Germano Augusto) 1934;
- Não tenho lágrimas (Mílton de Oliveira and Max Bulhões), 1937;
- Diabo sem rabo (Milton de Oliveira and Haroldo Lobo), 1938;
- No tronco da amendoeira (Mílton de Oliveira), 1939;
- Sete horas da manhã (Ciro de Sousa), 1941.
