= Na Baixa do Sapateiro =

Brazilian song by Ary Barroso

"Na Baixa do Sapateiro" (English: In the Shoemaker's Hollow) is a famous Brazilian song, written by Ary Barroso. Its title comes from a street in Salvador, Bahia, where many cobblers once worked. It was originally released in 1938 as the B side to Salada Mista, which did not achieve the same level of success. This first recording was sung by Carmen Miranda with Orchestra Odeon. She never released the song on disc in the United States. The song was originally going to be featured in the Carmen Miranda film Banana da Terra (1939), but was replaced with "O Que É Que A Baiana Tem?", because of the high license fee demanded by Ary Barroso to use his song. However the song has been recorded many other times by a large number of artists. The song gained international fame when it was featured in the Disney film The Three Caballeros (1944).

== Notable covers ==
The second recording of the song was in 1939, by Ary Barroso himself on the piano and Laurindo Almeida and Garoto on guitars. Other artists to record the song include Valdir Azevedo, Bola Sete, Elizete Cardoso, Dorival Caymmi, Luiz Bonfá, Paulinho Nogueira, Dilermando Reis, Baden Powell de Aquino, Lennie Dale and the Sambalanço Trio, Caterina Valente, Leny Andrade and the Breno Sauer Quarteto, Wilson Simonal, João Gilberto, Banda Black Rio, MPB4, Luiz Eça and Victor Assis Brasil, Gal Costa, Elis Regina, Toquinho, Raphael Rabello once with Ney Matogrosso and once with Romero Lubambo, Trio Mocoto, Eliane Elias, Léo Gandelman, Trio Esperança, João Nogueira, Nivaldo Ornelas and Juarez Moreira with Orquestra de Câmara Sesiminas, Rosa Passos and Lula Galvão, Caetano Veloso, and Raúl di Blasio.

== Baía ==
The song, retitled "Baía" (also known as "Bahia"), was featured in the 1944 Disney film The Three Caballeros, with English lyrics written by Ray Gilbert and sung by Nestor Amaral. The lyrics to "Baía" are not a translation of Ary Barroso’s original Portuguese lyrics, and differ from them considerably. However, both songs share a similar theme of longing for the past.

This version was very successful and has been played over a million times on US radio. Due to the popularity of the song, one million copies of sheet music were printed in the United States in 1945 alone.

=== Notable covers of Baía ===
On the official soundtrack of The Three Caballeros, the song was sung by Ray Gilbert with Charles Wolcott and his Orchestra.

Some notable artists who have recorded this version of the song are Bing Crosby with Xavier Cugat and his Waldorf-Astoria Orchestra, André Kostelanetz and Orchestra, Jack Pleis and His Orchestra, Claude Thornhill, Caterina Valente with Werner Müller and his Million Strings, Luiz Eça and Victor Assis Brasil, John Coltrane, Herbie Mann, Mickey Baker, Eddie "Lockjaw" Davis and Shirley Scott, Percy Faith and his Orchestra, Trio Los Panchos and Chucho Martinez Gil, Ahmad Jamal, Ed Lincoln (as Don Pablo de Havana) and sua Orquestra, Stan Getz and Charlie Byrd, Perry Como, Walter Wanderley, Gato Barbieri, Catalyst, The Ritchie Family, Idris Muhammad, Lalo Schifrin, Santana, Herb Alpert, Ran Blake, Laurindo Almeida, Martin Denny, Perez Prado, Mel Torme and Cleo Laine, Johnny Mathis, Dionne Warwick, Plácido Domingo, Tete Montoliu, Mongo Santamaria, Arthur Lyman, Blacktop, Juan Garcia Esquivel, Dinah Shore, Daniel Barenboim, Palmeira-Dutch band and Levita with João Donato, and John Klein and Sid Ramin.

== Quiet Village ==
And another major version of the song, more closely related to "Baía" than to the original, was Quiet Village by Les Baxter in 1951. This became a major hit when notably covered in 1957 by Martin Denny.
