= João Pernambuco =

Brazilian composer and guitarist (1883–1947)

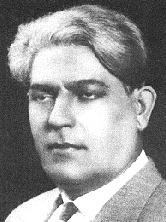
- Born: 2 November 1883; Jatobá, Pernambuco, Empire of Brazil
- Died: 16 October 1947 (aged 63); Rio de Janeiro, Brazil
- Occupations: Musician, composer, guitarist

João Teixeira Guimarães, better known as João Pernambuco (2 November 1883 – 16 October 1947), was a Brazilian composer and guitarist who is considered a fundamental figure in the trajectory of solo guitar playing in Brazil and is one of the principal names in the history of choro.

Originally from Pernambuco, his works established him as the point between roots music of the Northeast's sertão and the genres that came from Rio de Janeiro at the beginning of the 20th century, defining a form of playing the instrument. The composer of classic songs from the period such as "Sons de Carrilhões", "Interrogando", and "Dengoso", João Pernambuco influenced generations of artists, including Heitor Villa-Lobos, who expressed great admiration for his work. Despite a life of difficulties and struggles for the recognition of his work, as was the case for "Luar do Sertão", his legacy is frequently associated with the "most legitimate epression of the Brazilian way of playing the guitar".

== Biography ==
=== Origin and childhood (1883–1902) ===
João Teixeira Guimarães was born in the municipality of Jatobá, in the sertão of Pernambuco, the son of Teresa Vieira and the Portuguese immigrant Manuel Teixeira Guimarães. His childhood was marked by the popular culture of the region, where he had direct contact with the viola and the local scene with repentistas and guitar players, such as Bem-te-vi, Mandapolão, Manuel Cabeceira and the blind Sinfrônio, whom performed at local fairs and parties. These musical experiences formed the base of his artistic identity.

After his father's death in 1891, his mother married again and the family moved to Recife. While there, he continued his musical development while working as an assistant to help sustain the family.

=== Career in Rio de Janeiro (1902–1947) ===
Magoado
Choro "Magoado", composed and recorded (in 1930) by João Pernambuco.

In 1902, at 19 years old, Pernambuco moved to Rio de Janeiro, the then capital of Brazil. Initially he lived in Cordovil and worked at a foundry. In 1908, he became a servant of the municipality, going on to live in a boarding house in the city center. For many years, he led a double life: working as an ironsmith and on civil construction projects during the day and dedicating himself to music at night.

In the cultural environment of the Belle Époque in Rio, his talent gained notoriety. He rapidly became a member of the rodas of Choro music and, by 1908, he was recognized as one of the most well-known guitarrists in the city, alongside Quincas Laranjeiras and Satyro Bilhar. His accent and the songs and stories that he brought from his homeland yielded him the nickname with which he became known as going forward.

The boarding houses and student housing that he lived in were important centers where musicians met. Beginning in 1912, at Rua do Riachuelo, 268, brought together Pixinguinha and Donga. Later on, between 1928 and 1935, his house at Avenida Mem de Sá, 81, in Lapa, was the base for famous rodas de choro, frequented by many famed musicians, including the aforementioned, along with Patrício Teixeira and, sporadically, Heitor Villa-Lobos. It was at Pernambuco's house that he met a young Dilermando Reis.

== Musical works ==
=== Style and technique ===
Pernambuco is widely considered the first composer to develop a consistent language for the solo guitar in Brazil, uniting elements of the rural Northeast with the genres that flourished in Rio de Janeiro. His work was decisive in consolidating the guitar as a solo instrument.

His style presents the following characteristics:

- Northeastern themes: His compositions were rich in rhythms and melodies that were based on baião, xote, maracatu, and especially coco.
- Choro harmonies: He incorporated the harmonies of choro, with the use of chromatisms and modulations, with their musical base in the sertanejo.
- Guitar technique: Developed with his own style, with the use of loose chords as the low strings, complex arpeggios, and what was described as "thumbs that sing", in which his thumb directed the melody in the low registers of the instrument.

The musicologist Mozart de Araújo compared him to Ernesto Nazareth, affirming that: "João Pernambuco is to the guitar as Ernesto Nazareth was to the piano."

=== Notable compositions ===
João Pernambuco's works include more than 100 pieces, including choros, waltzes, jongos, maxixes, and studies.

- "Sons de Carrilhões": This choro-maxixe is his most played song internationally. It is a virtuoso piece that became part of the canon of the guitar's repertoire.
- "Interrogando" (Jongo): Composed in 1928, it is considered one of his most original works. With a structure that is based on jongo and lundu, the piece does not adhere to traditional models of choro, presenting instead a sophisticated harmony and an introspective atmosphere.
- "Dengoso" and "Graúna": They are choros that exemplify the lyricism and the rhythmic complexities of his compositions, respectively.

== "Luar do Sertão" controversy ==
The toada song "Luar do Sertão" became an unofficial album of sertaneja music, but it became a source of great frustration for Pernambuco, who authored it. He presented the melody, based on the folkloric theme of the coco song "É do Maitá", to poet Catulo da Paixão Cearense, which was responsible for the lyrics.

Catulo, however, registered the song in his name only, alleging that the melody was in the public domain and that Pernambuco had only just "recollected" the folklore. As a result, Catulo received all of the rights as author for the song, while Pernambuco was denied recognition and royalties. Pernambuco's authorship was only broadly defended after his death through accounts from artists such as Pixinguinha, who confirmed in an interview with the Museu da Imagem e do Som to have heard Pernambuco play the melody before the existence of lyrics. This was also confirmed by researchers such as Almirante.

== Collaborations and groups ==
=== Grupo do Caxangá and Oito Batutas ===
In 1914, Pernambuco, Pixinguinha, and Donga founded Grupo do Caxangá. The group, notable for their performances with traces typical of the sertão, was important for the spread of Northeastern music in Rio de Janeiro. In 1919, the group was the base for the formation of the Oito Batutas, one of the most influential groups of Música Popular Brasileira (MPB). With the Oito Batutas, Pernambuco participated in historic performances, such as ones held at the Assírio cabaret, connected to the Theatro Municipal do Rio de Janeiro, which contributed to valorization of choro and MPB to the cultural elite of the city.

=== Turunas Pernambucanos ===
Pernambuco also collaborated with the Turunas Pernambucanos, a group formed by musicians from the state of Pernambuco who lived in Rio. His participation reinforced their image as the main representatives of the musical culture of Pernambuco in Rio at that time period.

== Legacy and influence ==
João Pernambuco's legacy is vast, extending his repertoire to define a school of Brazilian guitar playing.

=== Relationship with Heitor Villa-Lobos ===
Heitor Villa-Lobos was an admirer of Pernambuco's music and frequented the rodas de choro at his house. According to reports, Villa-Lobos had stated that "Bach would not be embarrassed to sign the studies of João Pernambuco as being his." The sentence, despite scant documented evidence, is widely cited in biographies and studies, reflecting the high degree of esteem that the erudite composer had for his popular guitar works.

=== Influences in future generations ===
Pernambuco's work directly influenced famous guitarists such as that of Dilermando Reis, Luiz Bonfá, and, later on, Raphael Rabello and Turíbio Santos, the latter of whom recorded his entire body of work. The guitarist and researcher Maurício Carrilho noted that it would be hard to encounter a Brazilian guitarist, regardless of whether they were erudite or popular, who did not have some work by Pernambuco in their repertoire.

His main student principal aluno, Jaime Florence, known as "Meira", became one of the most important professors and followers of the guitar in Brazil, being responsible for transferring the technique and style of Pernambuco to generations of musicians.

=== Posthumous recognition ===
Despite having died in financial difficulty and without widespread recognition in life, Pernambuco's importance has been celebrated more and more. In 2023, on his 140th birthday, the book "Raízes e Frutos da Arte de João Pernambuco" was released, a project that revised and published his scores, seeking to preserve his work.

== Discography ==
Pernambuco's discography that was in 78 rpm was mainly recorded in the 1920s and 1930s by Odeon and Columbia.

- Sons de Carrilhões / Lágrimas (com Nelson Alves) (1926, Odeon 123.731)
- Magoado / Mimoso (com Nelson Alves) (1926, Odeon 123.733)
- Pó de Mico / Suspiro Apaixonado (1930, Columbia 5.231-D)
- Sonho de Magia / Magoado (solo) (1930, Columbia 5.232-D)
- Rosa Carioca / Rebuliço (1930, Columbia 5.233-D)
- Interrogando / Recordando (1930, Columbia 5.234-D)
- Sentindo / Dengoso (1930, Columbia 5.235-D)

== Selected works ==
The following is a selection of his most well known works.

- Araponga (Choro)
- Brasileirinho (Choro)
- Cabocla di Caxangá (com Catulo da Paixão Cearense)
- Céu e Mar (Valsa)
- Dengoso (Choro)
- Estou Voltando (com Pixinguinha e Donga)
- Estrada do Sertão (com Hermínio Bello de Carvalho)
- Graúna (Choro)
- Interrogando (Jongo)
- Lágrimas (Valsa)
- Luar do Sertão (com Catulo da Paixão Cearense)
- Magoado (Choro)
- Pó de Mico (Choro)
- Rebuliço (Choro)
- Recordando (Choro)
- Rosa Carioca (Choro)
- Sentindo (Choro)
- Sons de Carrilhões (Choro-maxixe)
- Valsa em Lá

== See also ==
- Choro
- Oito Batutas
- Pixinguinha
- Catulo da Paixão Cearense
