= Pelo Telefone =

1917 Brazilian samba

Song by Baiano
- A-side: "Pelo Telefone"
- Released: January 21, 1917
- Recorded: 1917
- Genre: Samba
- Length: 4:03
- Composers: Donga and Mauro de Almeida
- Producer: Casa Edison under the label Odeon Records

Pelo Telefone (English: On the Telephone) is a song attributed to the Brazilian guitarist and composer Donga and considered to be the first samba song to be recorded in Brazil, according to records at the National Library of Brazil, although earlier recordings exist, such as "Samba - Em Casa da Bahiana" (1913) and "Urubu Malandro" (1914).

A collective creation of controversial authorship, the composition is attributed to Ernesto dos Santos, better known as Donga, and to the journalist Mauro de Almeida. It was registered on the 27th of November, 1916 as being authored only by Donga — who later included de Almeida as a partner — and conceived in a famous Candomblé house, the house of Tia Ciata, which was frequented by popular musicians of the time. Because it was a huge success and because it was born in a samba circle from improvisations and joint creations, various musicians have claimed authorship.

== History ==
Pelo Telefone
"Pelo Telefone", composed by Donga (Ernesto Joaquim Maria dos Santos), and considered the first samba to be recorded in Brazil. Available from the Music and Sound Archives of the Brazilian National Library

The song was composed in 1916, in the backyard of Tia Ciata, in Praça Onze (now Cidade Nova). The song was originally titled "Roceiro" and was a collaborative creation, with participation from João da Baiana, Pixinguinha, Caninha, Hilário Jovino Ferreira and Sinhô, and others. Donga was the first to register the song, which he justified with a maxim attributed to Sinhô: "music is like a bird, it belongs to whoever catches it first". (Note: "música é como passarinho, de quem pegar primeiro")

The original lyrics of the song were later changed to the version best known today:

Original	Popularized	Popularized English translation
O chefe da folia	O Chefe da Polícia	The Police Chief
Pelo telefone	Pelo telefone	On the telephone
Mandou me avisar	Manda me avisar	Called to let me know
Que com alegria	Que na Carioca	That in Carioca
Não se questione	Tem uma roleta	There's a roulette wheel
Para se brincar	Para se jogar	To be played

According to a statement by Donga to Brazil's Museum of Image and Sound, "The chief of police... was a parody created by the journalists of A Noite (Note: "O Chefe da Polícia... foi uma paródia feita pelos jornalistas de A Noite"). In 1913, newspaper reporters had placed a roulette wheel in Largo da Carioca to demonstrate the police's tolerance of gambling. Musician and broadcaster Henrique Foréis Domingues, in the February 13, 1972 issue of the newspaper O Dia, confirmed this by saying: "someone in the newsroom of 'A Noite', taking inspiration from the episodes in question, created the famous parody". (Note: "alguém lá na redação de 'A Noite', inspirando-se nos episódios em questão, criou a famosa paródia") Domingues also accused Donga of having appropriated a collective work. Donga claimed that the music was different, but conceded that he was not the author of the lyrics, which were written by Mauro de Almeida. He blamed the label for omitting his partner's name. "The omission of Mauro's name on the recording by Casa Edison cannot be attributed to me" (Note: "A omissão do nome de Mauro na gravação da Casa Edison não pode ser atribuída a mim"), he said.

The Jornal do Brasil newspaper, on February 4, 1917, published a note from Grêmio Fala Gente announcing that "the true tango 'Pelo Telephone', by composers João da Mata, Germano, Tia Ciata and Hilário, will be sung on Avenida Rio Branco, dedicated to the good and remembered friend Mauro." (Note: “o verdadeiro tango Pelo Telefone, dos autores João da Mata, Germano, Tia Ciata e Hilário, seria cantado na Avenida Rio Branco, dedicado ao bom e lembrado amigo Mauro.")
