= Hilário Jovino Ferreira =

Brazilian composer, lyricist and carnival organizer

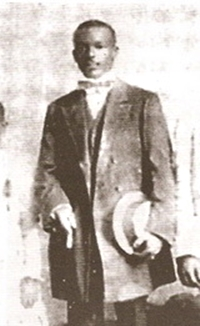
- Born: 1855; Bahia, Brazil
- Died: 1 March 1933 (aged 77); Rio de Janeiro, Brazil
- Occupations: Composer, lyricist
- Children: 1
- Relatives: Heitor dos Prazeres (nephew)

Hilário Jovino Ferreira, the Lalau de Ouro (21 October 1855 – 1 March 1933), was a Brazilian composer and lyricist who pioneered the genre of samba. He is considered the first carnival organizer.

A constant presence in various manifestations of the popular culture of Rio de Janeiro, Ferreira was the creator of the first carnival "ranch", the "Rei de Ouros", and was responsible for presenting new concepts to Carnival such as the enredo, the use of chorded and wind instruments for carnival, as well as archetypes such as the coupling of the mestre-sala and porta-bandeira.

== Biography ==
"Falsos filhos da Bahia
Que nunca pisaram lá
Que não comeram pimenta
Na moqueca e vatapá" — Hilário Jovino, in: "Entregue o Samba a seus Donos"

The son of freed slaves, Ferreira was born in 1855. Reliable sources diverge on his birthplace and birth year: it is suggested he was either born in Bahia or in Pernambuco, and was born in either 1855 or 1873. Though his place of birth has been contested by some, what is not contested is that he was raised in Bahia, raised in Afro-Brazilian culture and where he learned music. He would become a shipyard apprentice and was transferred to Rio de Janeiro on 17 June 1872, and from there, he identified himself as being from Bahia and one of the migrants responsible for bringing samba to the then capital of the country. He then went to live in Morro da Conceição, where he encountered a ranch called "Dois de Ouros" that he came across on the Day of Kings. Ferreira went to become a member of the ranch, but soon founded his "Rei dos Ouros" ranch, which was the first to participate in Carnival celebrations. This fact changed the Rio Carnival, giving rise to a "fever" of carnival "ranches".

Ferreira was the founder of other ranches, such as "Rosa Branca", "Botão de Rosa", "As Jardineiras", "Filhas da Jardineira", "Ameno Resedá", "Reino das Magnólias", and "Riso Leal", as well as carnival blocs such as "Paredes têm ouvidos" and "Macaco é outro". Ferreira had also been engaged in malandragem, including having spent a day in jail for threatening the landlord where he lived for charging him for late rent. He was also jailed for bodily harm for blows made to police capoeira style as they pursued him.

He was a frequent guest at the house of Tia Ciata, and became involved with the authoring of the first ever recorded samba Pelo Telefone. The song was in fact not made by the singer of the original version, Donga, but was made by a collective in Tia Ciata's home. Ferreira was one of the authors of the song.

During a 1930 interview, he recounted the history of the "ranchos" that preceded the Rio Carnival, which saw various people from Bahia, including Ferreira, meeting up on occasion, and eventually meeting up at a contemporary's house. There, they founded the first rancho.

Ferreira was the father of Saturnino, who also engaged in malandragem at Praça Onze. He was the uncle of Heitor dos Prazeres.

== Sickness and death ==
In January 1933, Ferreira left from participating in Rio Carnival, including the entity that he presided over, for "thinking he was sick". The newspaper “Diário Carioca” returned to publish the news about his sickness on 28 January.

On 2 March, the same newspaper reported of his death the day prior, eulogizing him as a "monarch without pretensions of nobility to those he served since the days of his youth, the beloved and veteran carnival organizer". They later said "Baiano, a son of that piece of Brazil where our popular festival had its start...coming to Rio and having brought with him the style of carnival characteristic of his native land." He was buried at Cemitério de São Francisco Xavier.

== See also ==
- Rio Carnival
- Samba

== Bibliography ==
- ALMIRANTE. No Tempo de Noel Rosa. São Paulo: Livraria Francisco Alves, 1963.
- CABRAL, Sérgio. As Escolas de Samba do Rio de Janeiro. Rio de Janeiro: Lumiar, 1996.
- EFEGÊ, Jota. Ameno Resedá - o rancho que foi escola. Rio de Janeiro: Editora Letras e Artes Ltda, 1965.
- EFEGÊ, Jota. Figuras e coisas da Música Popular Brasileira. Rio de Janeiro: MEC/FUNARTE, 1978.
- MARCONDES, Marcos Antônio. (ED). Enciclopédia da Música popular brasileira: erudita, folclórica e popular. 2. ed. São Paulo: Art Editora/Publifolha, 1999.
- MOURA, Roberto. Tia Ciata e a Pequena África no Rio de Janeiro. Rio de Janeiro: Coleção Biblioteca Carioca, 1995.
- SEVERIANO, Jairo e MELLO, Zuza Homem de. A canção no tempo. Volume 1. São Paulo: 34, 1997.
- VAGALUME. Na Roda de Samba. Rio de Janeiro: Tip. São Benedito, 1933.
- VASCONCELOS, Ary. Panorama da Música Popular Brasiuleira na Belle Époque. Rio de Janeiro: Livraria Sant'Anna, 1977.
