= Relendo Dilermando Reis =

Studio album by Raphael Rabello
- Released: 1994
- Recorded: April 12–15, 1994
- Genres: Choro, Waltz
- Length: 48:27
- Label: RGE
- Producer: J. C. Botezelli (Pelão)

Relendo Dilermando Reis is a 1994 album recorded by the Brazilian musician Raphael Rabello. Produced by J. C. Botezelli, also known as Pelão, the album won the Sharp Awards for Best Soloist in the same year. The disc presents many choro and waltz songs interpreted by Dilermando Reis in the past.

== Track listing ==
#	Title	Songwriters	Length
1.	"Abismo de rosas"	Américo Jacomino (Canhoto)	4:15
2.	"Doutor Sabe Tudo"	Dilermando Reis	2:58
3.	"Interrogando"	João Pernambuco	2:53
4.	"Uma valsa e dois amores"	Dilermando Reis	3:47
5.	"Brejeiro"	Ernesto Nazareth	3:03
6.	"Se ela perguntar"	Dilermando Reis, Jair Amorim	6:43
7.	"Sons de carrilhões"	João Pernambuco	3:35
8.	"Xodó da baiana"	Dilermando Reis	6:00
9.	"Magoado"	Dilermando Reis	4:04
10.	"Tempo de criança"	Dilermando Reis	3:29
11.	"Marcha dos marinheiros"	Américo Jacomino (Canhoto)	2:48
12.	"Noite de lua"	Dilermando Reis	4:48

== Personnel ==
- Raphael Rabello: seven string acoustic guitar
