= Tia Ciata =

Brazilian mãe-de-santo (1854–1924)

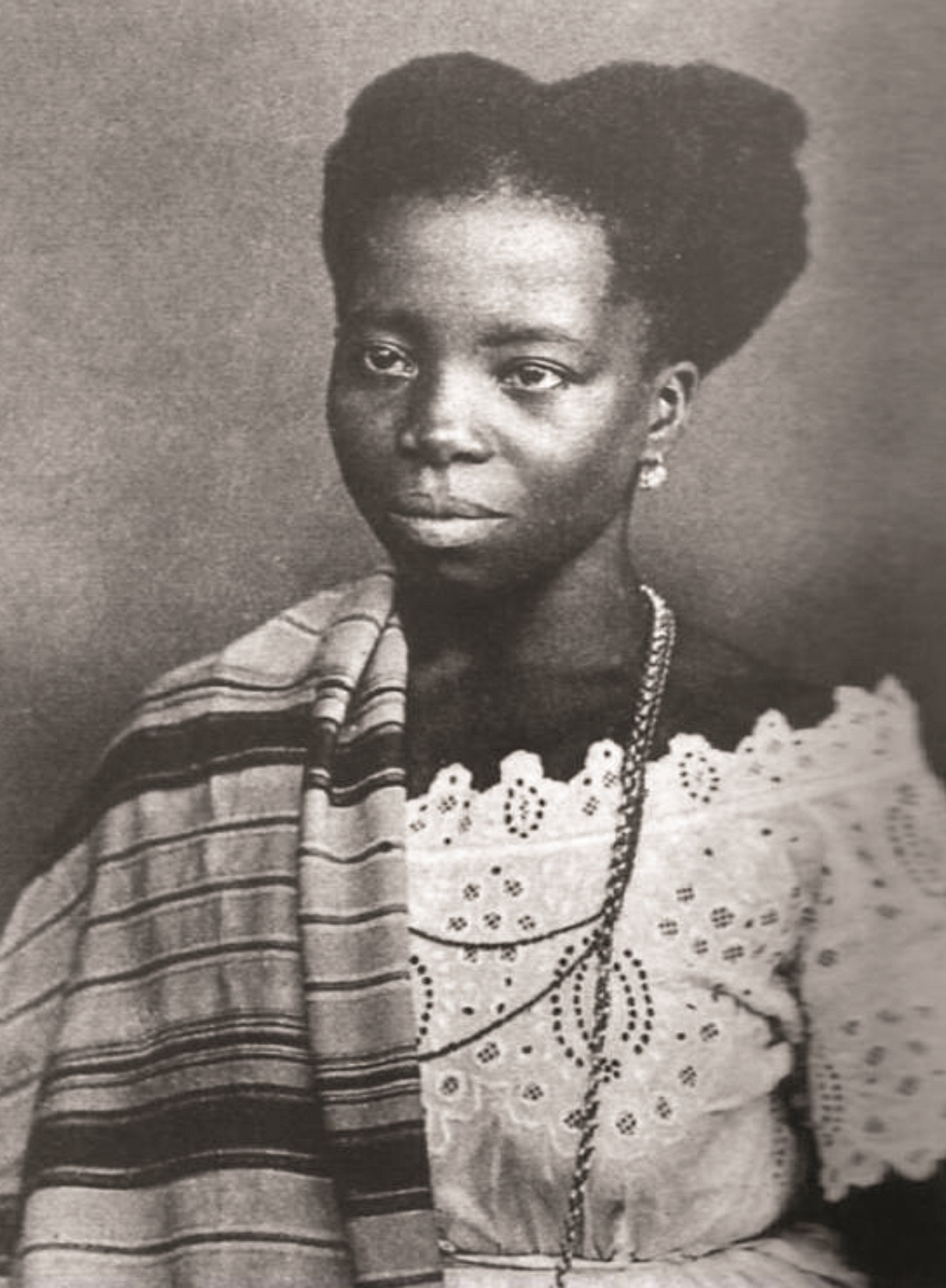
- Tia Ciata, c.1900
- Born: Hilária Batista de Almeida; 1854; Santo Amaro, Bahia
- Died: 1924 (aged 69–70); Rio de Janeiro
- Occupations: Cook, mãe-de-santo of Candomblé
- Known for: Early figure in samba
- Spouse: João Batista da Silva

Tia Ciata, born Hilária Batista de Almeida (1854–1924) was a Brazilian mãe-de-santo of Candomblé, and an influential figure in the development of samba. She was a devotee of the deity Oshun and became the iyakekerê, or second most important leader, in the terreiro of João Alabá in Rio de Janeiro.

== Early life ==
Hilária Batista de Almeida was born in 1854 in Santo Amaro, Bahia, and initiated in the Candomblé religion in Salvador by Bangboshe Obitikô (Rodolfo Martins de Andrade). "Ciata", the name by which she is now known, is a variant on the Arabic name Aycha; it was a common feminine name among the Muslim community from Portuguese Guinea that formerly resided in Rio de Janeiro.

Tia Ciata arrived in Rio de Janeiro in 1876 at the age of 22 and worked as a vendor at a food stall. She lived on Rua Visconde de Itauna in the neighborhood of Praça Onze (now Cidade Nova), an area which became known as "Pequena África" (Little Africa). It was here that Tia Ciata became one of the main progenitors of Afro-Brazilian culture of early favelas of Rio de Janeiro. As a devotee of the Yoruba deity Oshun she became the iyakekerê in the terreiro of João Alabá in Rio de Janeiro.

== Samba ==
Samba musicians, composers, and dancers regularly gathered in her home; her residence may be one of the birthplaces of the genre. Samba evolved in Ciata's back yard. Here one would find future giants of the genre including Pixinguinha, João da Baiana and Heitor dos Prazeres. Ciata's yard became a trendsetting cultural hub, where new samba composers and songs could find popularity before the existence of radio in Brazil. The first samba recording, Pelo Telefone, a composition by Donga (Ernesto Joaquim Maria dos Santos) and Mauro de Almeida, was recorded in the residence in 1916. Like Tia Ciata, the vocalist of Pelo Telefone was from Santo Amaro, Bahia.

Police persecuted Black musicians and practitioners of Afro-Brazilian religions, despite the individual liberties promised by the 1891 Constitution of Brazil. Ciata grew smart at evading repression. A true samba party would necessarily require the presence of drums, which have always been negatively associated with the Afro-Brazilian religious cults. So Ciata would wisely place the samba musicians in the backyards, supposedly the most hidden and safest part of the house. In the entrance hall, the house's most visible and audible space, brass and string instrumentalists would be playing ‘choro’ music – considered more erudite, and hardly linked to anything close to ‘Black magic’. When the police came, Ciata would say she was hosting a choro gathering and things would normally be fine for the rest of the night. Ciata's parties gained legitimacy thanks to a chance encounter with the president. As a practitioner of the Afro-Brazilian religion of Candomblé, she was highly respected for her spiritual wisdom. When President Venceslau Brás (1914-1918) sought a cure for a long-term leg infection that no doctor could treat, an adviser recommended Ciata's herbal treatments.

== Personal life ==
Tia Ciata married João Batista da Silva, and had fourteen children. The couple became noted figures in Pequena África of Rio, and Tia Ciata was honored annually at the Rio Carnival until her death in Rio de Janeiro in 1924.

Her husband João Batista da Silva died on July 13, 1907, a time when Tia Ciata was already considered an authority and a star in the Rio samba scene. She had respect and popularity far greater than any black personality of the time. Every year, during Carnival, she would set up a tent in Praça Onze, where she would launch the marchinhas that would become famous at the city's Carnival.

== Legacy ==
A biography about her was written by author Jarid Arraes as part of her 2015 cordel collection and book Heroínas Negras Brasileiras em 15 cordéis. In 2007, the Casa da Tia Ciata cultural centre was founded by some of her descendants to celebrate in her memory and promote Afro-descendant culture and its key place in the history of Rio's samba culture.
