= Aracy =

Aracy is a feminine given name. Notable people with the name include:

- Aracy de Almeida, Brazilian singer
- Aracy Amaral (1930–2026), Brazilian art historian and art curator
- Aracy Balabanian, Brazilian actress
- Aracy de Carvalho, Brazilian clerk
- Aracy Cortes, Brazilian singer, dancer, and actress
