= Aracy Cortes =

Brazilian singer, dancer and actress

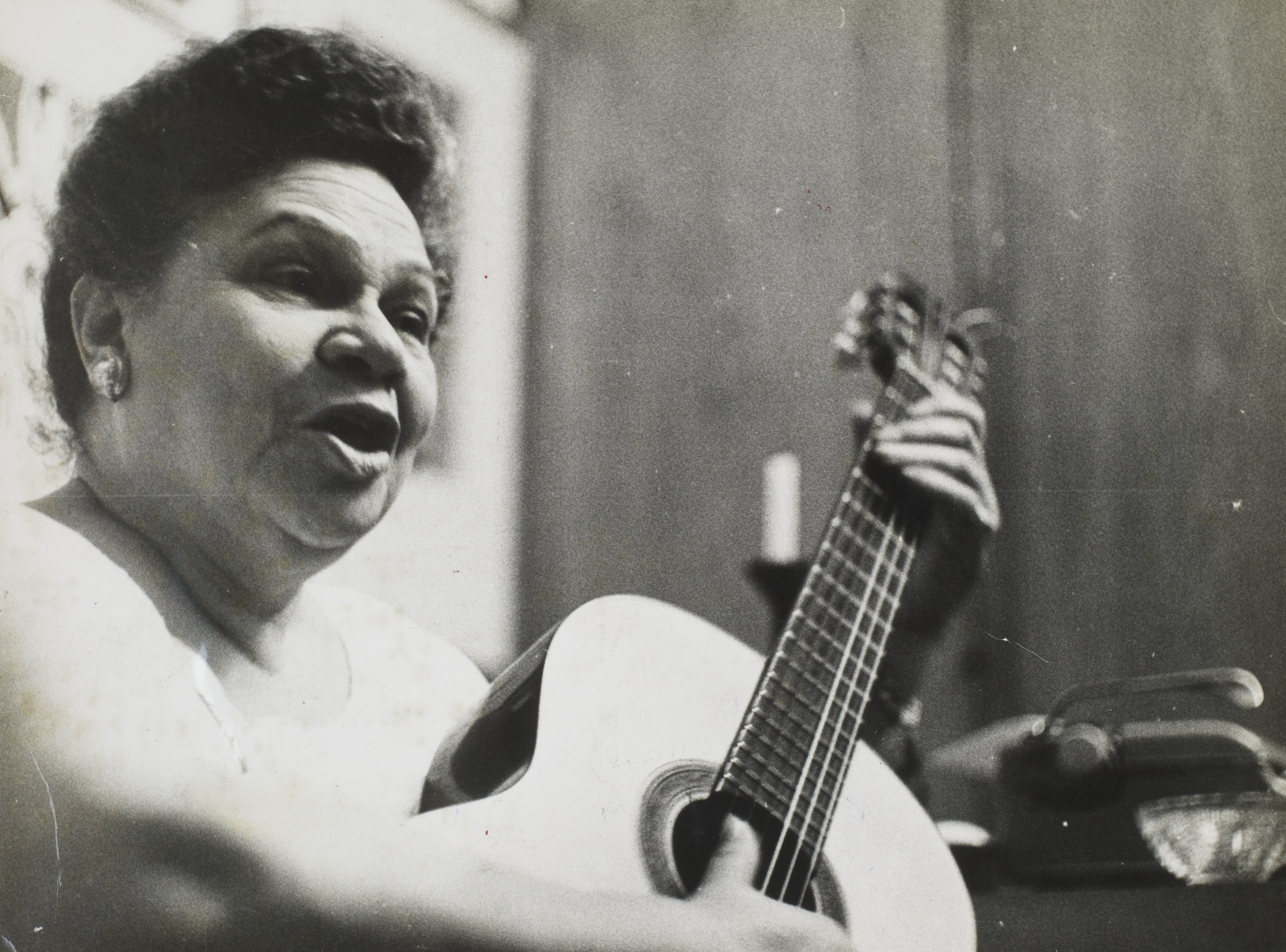
- Aracy Cortes in 1965

Background information
- Born: Zilda de Carvalho Espíndola; March 31, 1904; Rio de Janeiro, DF, Brazil
- Died: January 8, 1985 (aged 80) Rio de Janeiro, RJ, Brazil
- Genres: Samba-canção
- Occupation: Singer
- Label: Odeon Brunswick Columbia Funarte
- Formerly of: Rosa de Ouro

Zilda de Carvalho Espíndola (March 31, 1904 – January 8, 1985), professionally known as Aracy Cortes, was a Brazilian singer, dancer and actress. She is best known for bringing the traditional Brazilian samba forms into theatre (see samba-canção) and for being the first artist to perform Ary Barroso's "Aquarela do Brasil" in 1939.

She was born in Estació, and raised by a very strict godmother. Her family moved to Catumbi, where her neighbor was a young boy who played the flute, Pixinguinha, the founder of the group Oito batutas.

Of her own initiative, she began singing in various theaters around the city, becoming known for her soprano voice and personal way of singing. This recognition came with the music "Que Pedaço," by Sena Pinto (1923), and another success immediately after, "Jura," by Sinhô (1928). Her recordings from the late 1920s had an influence on the interpretive style of Carmen Miranda in the 1930s. She launched other unknown artists as well in the 1930s: Ary Barroso and Assis Valente. She was the star of the Teatro de Revista da Praça Tiradentes, and the Teatro Recreio in Rio de Janeiro. With performances running in the revue theaters that gathered the cream of the artistic crop, she was projected as the first major popular woman singer, standing out among the almost exclusivism of the masculine voices of the time. She was also the first performer of "Aquarela do Brasil" (Ary Barroso), the first and most important Brazilian song exported to the USA, inaugurating the samba-exaltação genre and becoming one of the genre's biggest names.

== Greatest Hits ==
- 1925 - Petropolitana
- 1925 - Serenata de Toselli
- 1925 - A Casinha (A Casinha da Colina)
- 1926 - Serenata de Toselli
- 1928 - Chora, Violão
- 1928 - Jura
- 1929 - Ai, Ioiô
- 1929 - Yaya (Linda flor)
- 1929 - "A polícia já foi lá em casa"
- 1929 - "Vão por mim" - com Francisco Alves
- 1929 - "Baianinha"
- 1930 - Você Não Era Assim
- 1931 - Quero Sossego
- 1931 - Reminiscências
- 1932 - Tem Francesa no Morro
- 1932 - Dentinho de Ouro
- 1932 - Que é Que…?
- 1951 - Eu Sou Assim
- 1951 - Eu Sou Assim
