= Praça Onze =

Historic site in Rio de Janeiro, Brazil

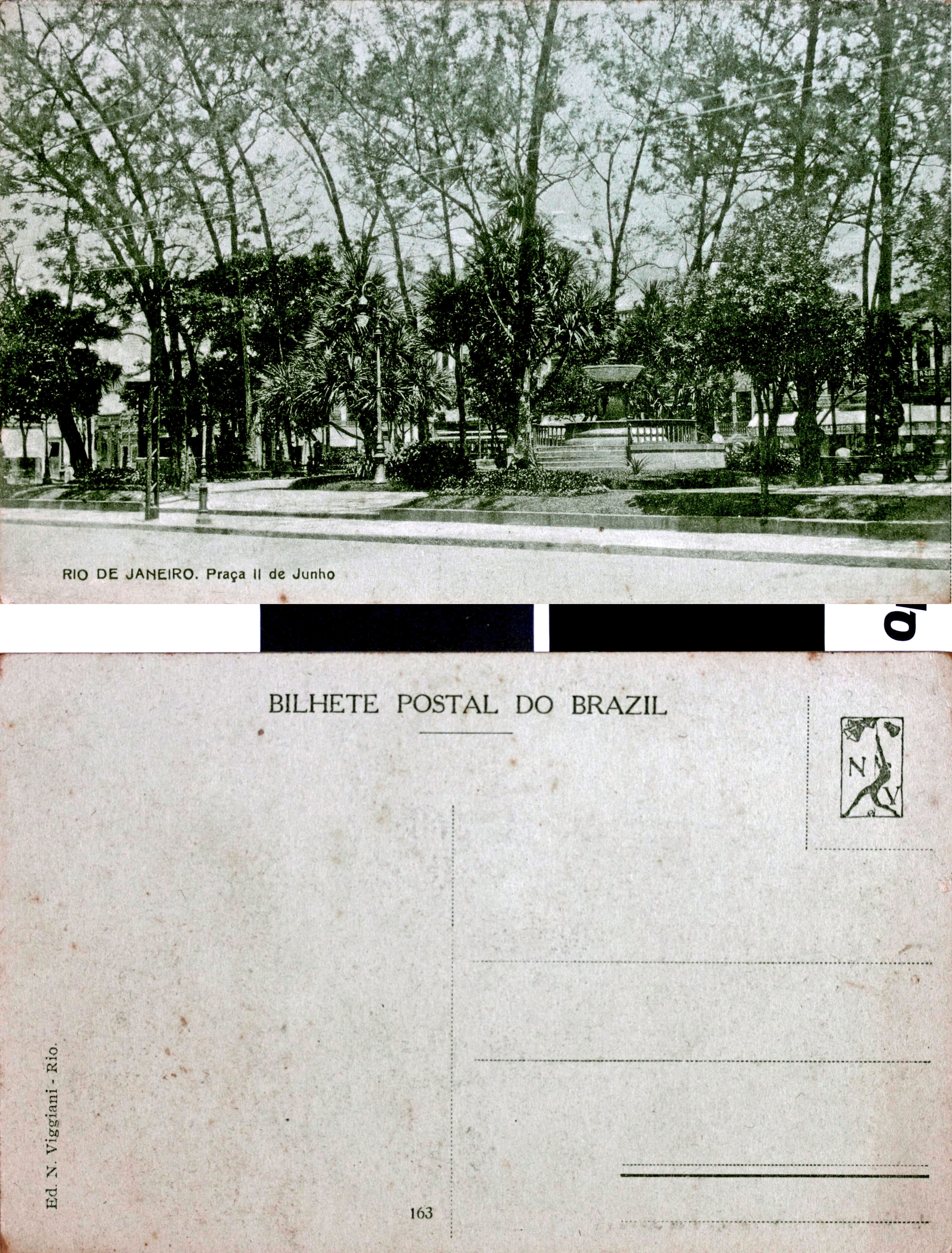
Praça Onze de Junho.

22°54′24.57″S 43°11′47.15″W

Praça Onze (English: Eleven Square) is a historic site in the central region of Rio de Janeiro. It is located in the Centro district, on the border with the Cidade Nova district. The original Praça Onze de Junho (June 11th Square), named after the date of the Battle of Riachuelo, existed until the 1940s. It bordered the streets of Santana (to the east), Marquês de Pombal (to the west), Senador Euzébio (to the north) and Visconde de Itaúna (to the south).

Originally called Largo do Rocio Pequeno, it became one of the most cosmopolitan places in Rio de Janeiro in the early decades of the 20th century, as it housed newly landed immigrant families. The most popular ethnic groups were blacks (mostly from Bahia), followed by Jews of various origins. Portuguese, Spanish and Italians were also numerous.

== History ==
The site was uninhabited until the end of the 18th century, as the land was unsuitable for farming and building due to the marshy nature of the area. After the Portuguese Royal Family arrived in Rio de Janeiro and settled in the Paço de São Cristóvão, the first access roads to the area were built. In 1810, by order of King John VI, the Cidade Nova was created, stretching from Campo de Santana to São Cristovão. The area had straight streets and large plots, very different from the central area, which was congested with houses on narrow plots. He also created the Largo do Rocio Pequeno, where the São Diogo Mangrove began.

Despite being the only commercial square in Cidade Nova, Rocio Pequeno remained abandoned. In 1842, during the Second Reign, a neoclassical fountain designed by Grandjean de Montigny was installed in the center of the area to supply the surrounding houses and establishments. In 1854, with the construction and inauguration of the Gas Factory, the Viscount of Mauá recognized the need to channel the mangrove swamp, cleaning up the path to Guanabara Bay and providing a waterway system linking the suburbs to the city center. In 1858, he inaugurated the Dom Pedro II Railway, which ran through Cidade Nova, connecting it to several suburbs and the interior of the province. After Brazil's victory in the Battle of Riachuelo, Largo do Rocio Pequeno was renamed after the date of the conflict. At the time, with the decline of the slave system, Praça Onze de Junho became a popular destination for immigrants, due to the proximity to the port and the varied commerce.

=== African cultural presence ===
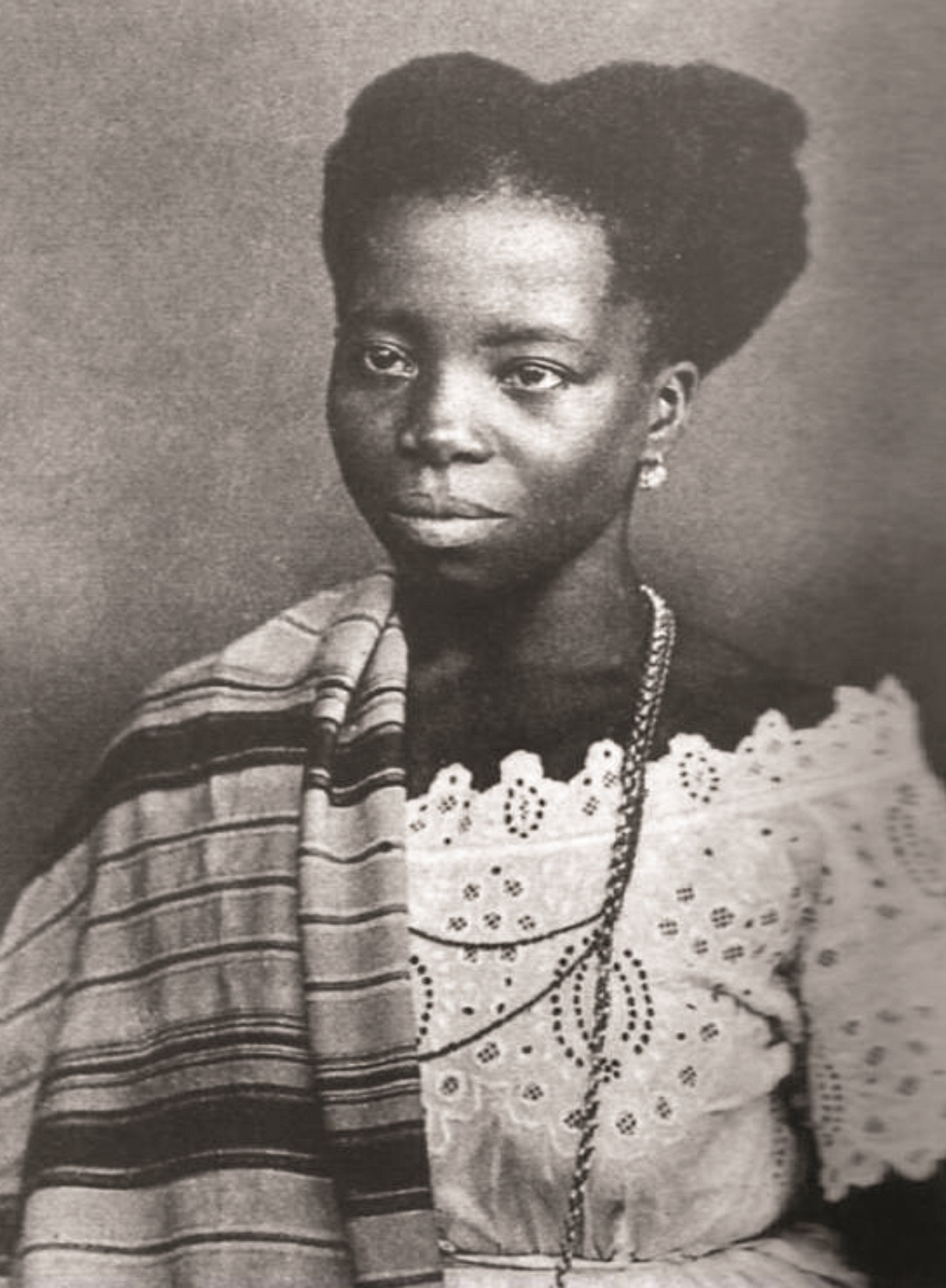
Tia Ciata.

After slavery was abolished, large masses of former slaves settled in the precarious one-bedroom houses that existed in the streets adjacent to the Praça Onze de Junho. Later, they moved into improvised shacks on the slopes of the hills. One of these settlements was called Morro da Favela by soldiers returning from the Canudos War and originated the name of highly populated urban residential area of weak build quality in Brazil.

At the beginning of the 20th century, Praça Onze de Junho was the stronghold of the black population of Rio de Janeiro. Samba originated in the region, combining the batucada brought by the blacks from Bahia and the lundu from Rio de Janeiro. One of the important locations for the creation of samba was the house of Tia Ciata, a woman from Bahia who moved to Rio de Janeiro and used to cook snacks. She became famous in the square and her house turned into a meeting place for musicians and local people.

The house of Tia Ciata served as the principal place where African music and rhythms were played in the community. In 1926, due to police harassment, some local composers founded a "samba school", a euphemistic name for a recreational association that had no educational aims. The first was Deixa Falar, whose divisions would result in several other schools, such as Estácio de Sá, Mangueira and Portela. In 1933, Mayor Pedro Ernesto organized the first official samba school parade in Praça Onze de Junho, which Mangueira won.

=== Jewish presence ===
Praça Onze de Junho gathered the largest Jewish concentration in the city of Rio de Janeiro. Jewish immigrants chose the location because the configuration of the houses provided space for stores on the first floor and residences on the upper floors. Hundreds of Jewish establishments, as well as clubs, political groups and synagogues settled in the area.

== Construction of Presidente Vargas Avenue ==
In the 1930s, Rio de Janeiro City Hall planned modernization works for the region, including the construction of a new road to improve access from the center to the north. Consequently, Praça Onze de Junho was significantly reduced. According to the project, the blocks between Senador Eusébio and Visconde de Itaúna streets were to be demolished for the opening of the new Presidente Vargas Avenue. In 1941, demolitions began, displacing hundreds of families and bringing down 525 buildings, including some historic constructions, such as the churches of Saint Peter of the Clerics and Saint Joachim.

== References in culture ==
In the 1940s, Herivelto Martins and Grande Otelo united and wrote the samba "Praça Onze", which was recorded by Trio de Ouro in 1941 and became a big hit at Carnival the following year, the last to be held at Praça Onze. In 1944, Quatro Ases e Um Curinga paid homage to Rio de Janeiro in the song "O Samba não morre", which also mentions Praça Onze. In 1965, Chico Anysio and João Roberto Kelly composed the song "Rancho da Praça Onze", which portrays the cultural effervescence of the place. The lyrics celebrate the joy and tradition of the carnival ranches of Praça Onze, highlighting the unity and diversity of the people who gathered to celebrate. The song immortalizes the importance of the place as a stage for the cultural and popular manifestations of Rio de Janeiro and Brazil.

== Present day ==
After the construction of Presidente Vargas Avenue, Praça Onze de Junho shrank in size and became a venue for regular circus shows. In the 1970s, the Praça Onze metro station opened in the area. Between 1983 and 1986, Governor Leonel Brizola attempted to turn the site into a regularized space for street vendors, but the project failed due to the site's distance from the city center. The current monument to Zumbi dos Palmares stands on land that belonged to the former Praça Onze de Junho. Today, the site houses the Terreirão do Samba, a venue for popular music concerts. The Jewish presence remains close to the square in the traditional commercial area of Sociedade de Amigos das Adjacências da Rua da Alfândega (SAARA).

== See also ==
- Central do Brasil
