= Campo de Santana (park) =

Park in Rio de Janeiro, Brazil

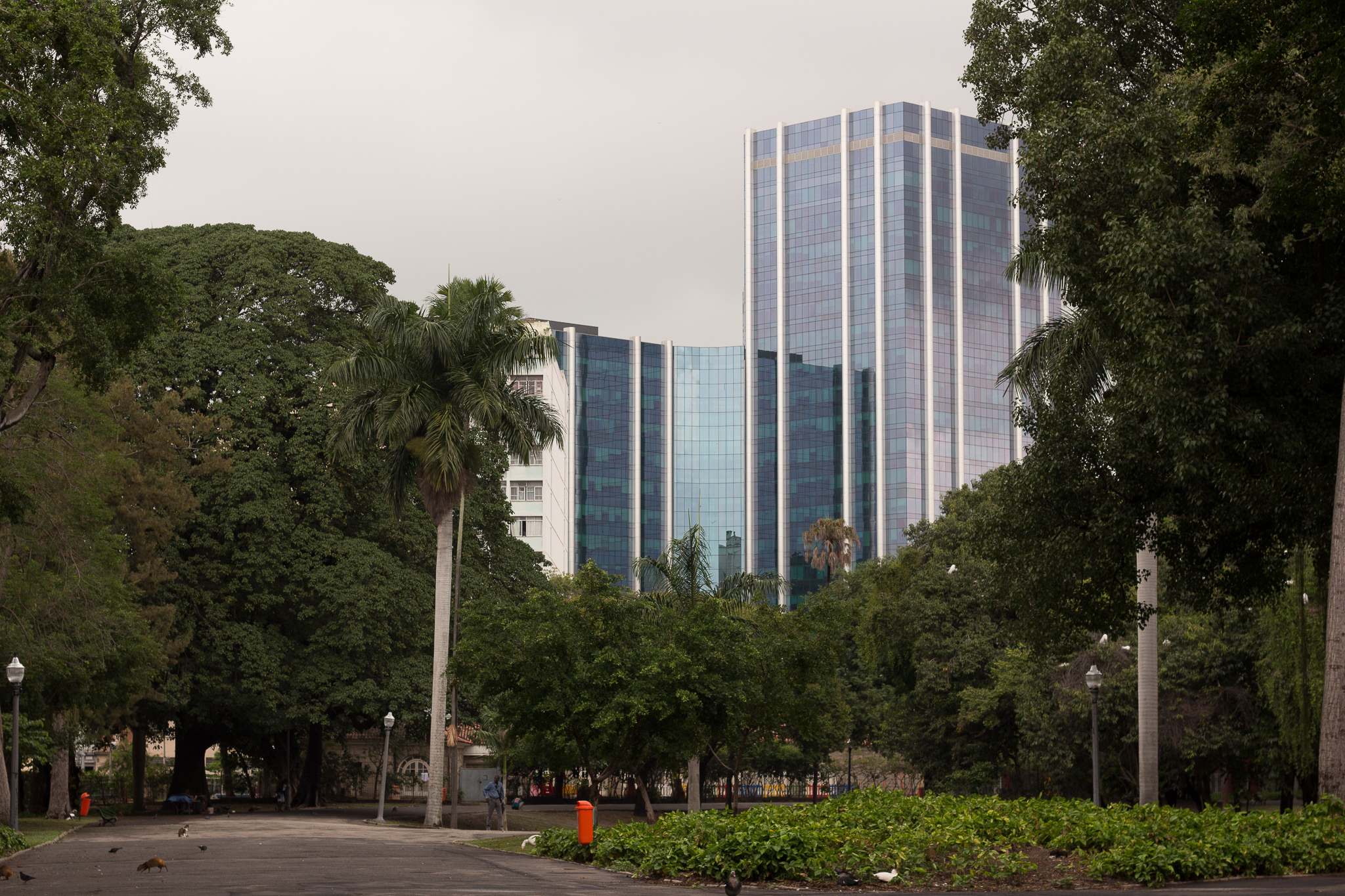
- Interactive map of Campo de Santana
- Location: Rio de Janeiro, RJ
- Coordinates: 22°54′24″S 43°11′19″W
- Designation: Urban park
- Established: 1880
- Governing body: Fundação Municipal Parques e Jardins (Secretaria de Meio Ambiente)

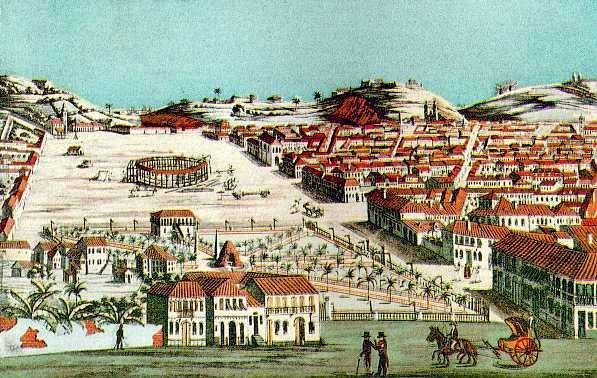
Campo de Santana in a painting by Franz Josef Frühbeck (1818)

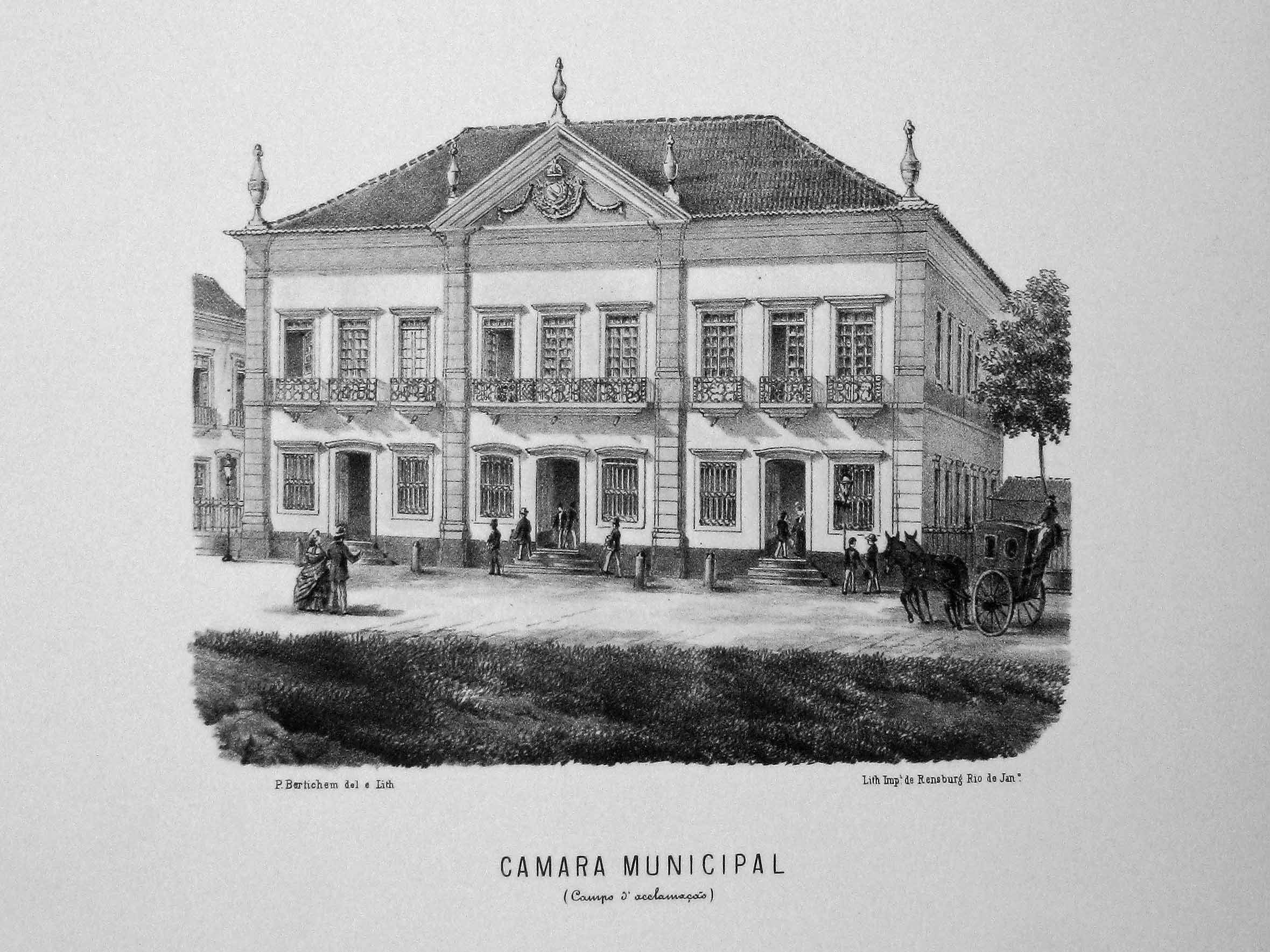
Drawing from 1856 depicting the old City Hall building located near the plaza

The Campo de Santana is a park located in the Praça da República in downtown Rio de Janeiro, Brazil. The name of the plaza refers to the fact that it is located near the site where Brazil was declared a republic in 1889.

== History ==
During the colonial period in Brazil, the area currently occupied by the park was an enormous swamp. Over time, the swamp was filled in and used as a public space. The region became known as "Campo da Cidade" or "Campo de São Domingos" and served as a divider between downtown Rio de Janeiro and the rural areas surrounding it.

In 1753, it became known as "Campo de Santana". This name originated with a church that was constructed in the region that developed a large number of devotees. The church was demolished in 1854 to make way for the first urban railroad station in Brazil, the Dom Pedro II Station. Later, on the site of this first station, the city's Central do Brasil station was built.

In the same area, several important buildings were erected. The Palácio do Conde dos Arcos (1819) functioned as the headquarters for the Brazilian Senate for nearly a hundred years. The building now houses the law school for the Federal University of Rio de Janeiro (UFRJ). The Brazilian Mint building (1863), which is currently the location of the Brazilian National Archive, was one of many government buildings placed in the Campo de Santana region. The Army Command building (1811), City Hall, the Corps of Military Firefighters for Rio de Janeiro (state), the Rivadávia Correia municipal school, MEC radio station, and the churches of St. Mary and St. Gonçalo Garcia are also located in this area.

This part of the city also became the stage for several significant historical events, such as: the Acclamation of Emperor Dom Pedro I (1822), the Proclamation of the Republic (1889), and the Vaccine Revolt protests (1904).

== Structure ==
In 1942, with the construction of the Avenida Presidente Vargas and the demolition of several buildings nearby, the plaza was divided in two. One side featured the Palácio Duque de Caxias, the Brazilian Military Command building (1937), and the Panteão Duque de Caxias. The gardens of the Campo de Santana, a wide, tree-lined public promenade constructed at the beginning of the 20th century, is located on the opposite side of the plaza. Reforms of this area, as part of a city-wide project, began again in 1873 and were completed in 1880 by French landscaper Auguste François Marie Glaziou. Several species of animal are present in the Campo de Santana park, including: agoutis, cats, wild ducks and peacocks. A little-known fact about the park is that it used to be the site of bullfights. They were popular spectacles until they were banned in 1907 by decree of the mayor, Francisco Marcelino de Sousa Aguiar.

Currently, the plaza is located between the Rua da Alfândega, the Frei Caneca Street, the Rua Moncorvo Filho (near the campus of the UFRJ law school), and the Avenida Presidente Vargas. The park at the Campo de Santana was established in 1968 by the Instituto Estadual do Patrimônio Cultural and, in 2012, the National Institute of Historic and Artistic Heritage also announced its commitment to maintain the park. The park is also a popular location among the city's homeless and drug users, which has generated complaints from residents. The local government considers this a significant social issue and has taken steps to increase security in the area.
