= Donga (musician) =

Brazilian musician 1890 - 1974

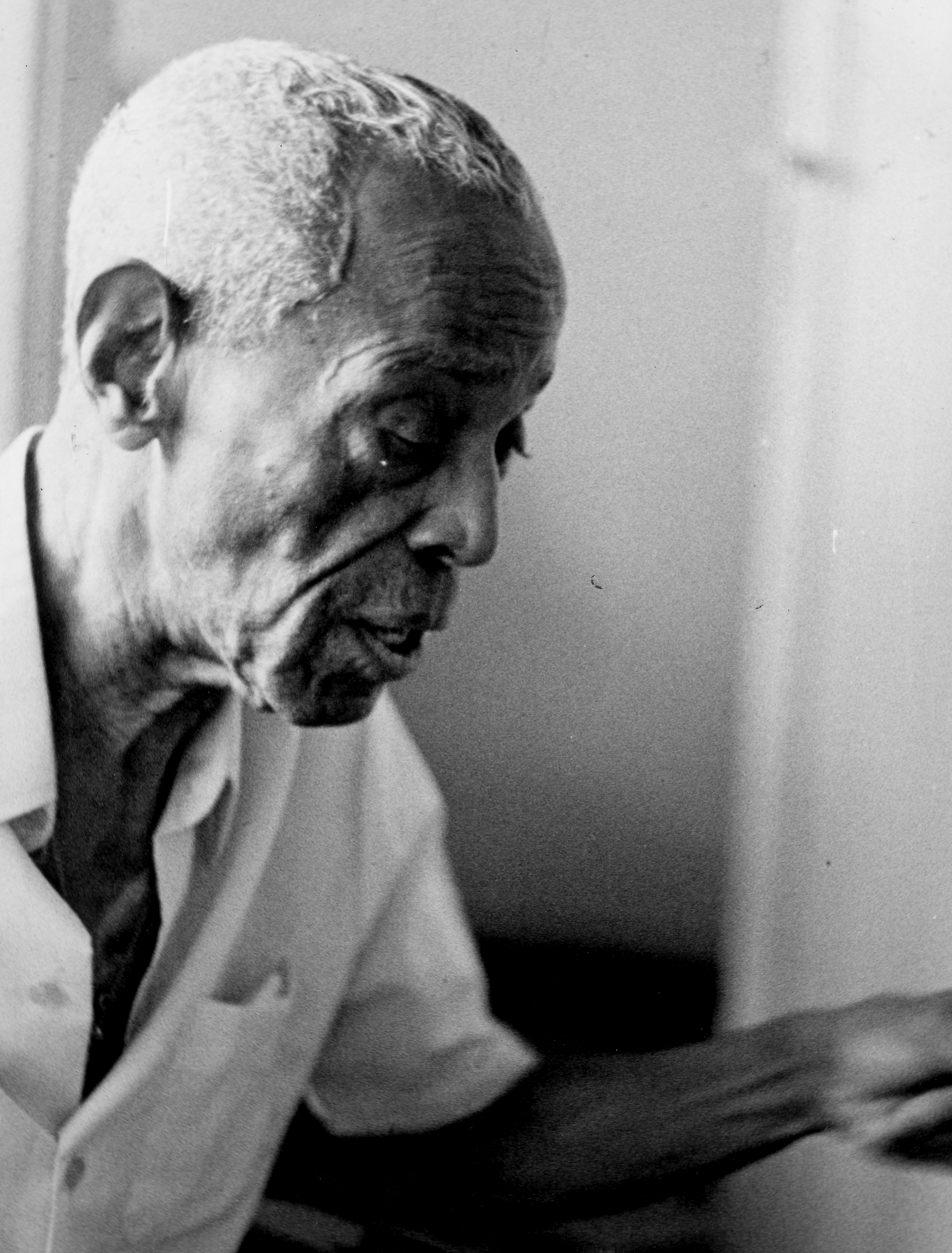

Background information
- Born: Ernesto Joaquim Maria dos Santos; April 5, 1890; Rio de Janeiro, Brazil
- Died: August 25, 1974 (aged 84) Rio de Janeiro
- Genre: Samba
- Instruments: Acoustic guitar; Cavaquinho; Banjo
- Years active: 1916–1953

Ernesto Joaquim Maria dos Santos, better known as Donga, (April 5, 1890 – August 25, 1974) was a Brazilian guitarist and composer. He composed what is considered the first recorded samba, the 1916 song Pelo Telefone.

== Life and career ==
Donga was born in Rio de Janeiro, the son of Pedro Joaquim Maria and Amélia Silvana de Araújo; he had eight siblings. His father was a bricklayer and played the euphonium in his spare time; his mother was the known Tia Amélia from the group of tias baianas of Cidade Nova and liked to sing modinhas and promoted countless parties.

He participated in the musical gatherings at the home of Tia Ciata, alongside João da Baiana, Pixinguinha, Hilário Jovino Ferreira and others. A big fan of Mário Cavaquinho, he started playing that instrument by ear, at the age of 14. Shortly afterwards he learned to play the guitar, studying with Quincas Laranjeiras. In November 1916 he registered in the National Library of Brazil the recording of Pelo Telefone, considered the first recorded samba in history.

He organized with Pixinguinha the Orquestra Típica Donga-Pixinguinha. In 1919, together with Pixinguinha and six other musicians, he joined, as a guitarist, the group Oito Batutas, which toured Europe in 1922.

In 1926 he joined the band Carlito Jazz band. In 1940 Donga recorded nine compositions (among sambas, toadas, macumbas and lundus) from the album Native Brazilian Music, organized by two conductors: Leopold Stokowski and Heitor Villa-Lobos, released in the United States by Columbia.

At the end of the 50s he returned to perform with the group Velha Guarda, in shows organized by Almirante.

== Personal life and death ==
In 1932 Donga married Zaíra de Oliveira, also a musician, with whom he had a daughter, Lígia. Zaíra died in 1951; Donga married again in 1953 and went to live in the neighborhood of Aldeia Campista, where he retired as a retired bailiff. Sick and almost blind, he lived his last days at the Retiro dos Artistas, dying in 1974. He is buried in the São João Batista Cemetery.

Elson Nascimento, most well known as a member of the Sun Ra Arkestra, is one of Donga's direct descendants.
