= Luar do Sertão =

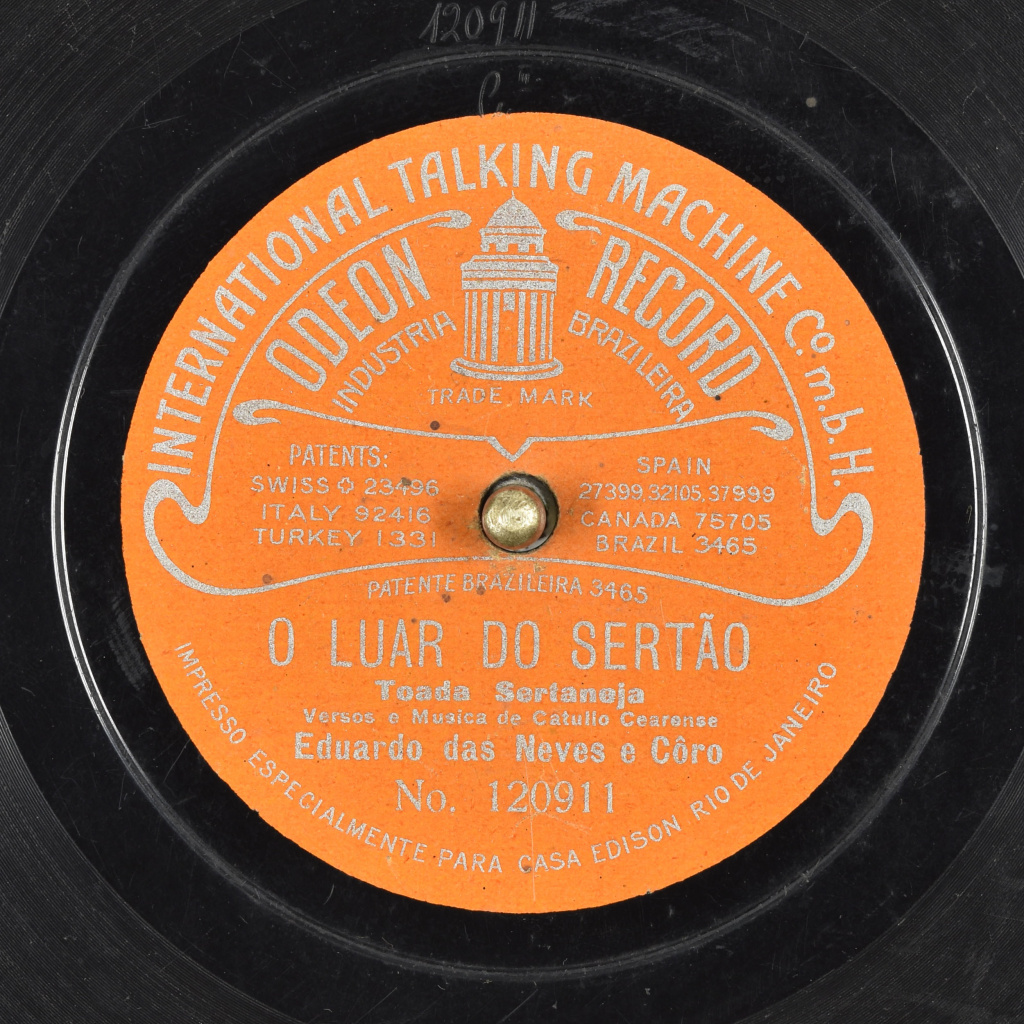
Phonogram from 1914 of "Luar do Sertão", released by Casa Edison

Luar do Sertão (Hinterlands Moonlight in English) is a popular Brazilian song. Its verses are simple and naive praising the life in sertão. Sertão is a Portuguese word for hinterlands, countryside or outback. It was originally a coco under the title "Engenho de Humaitá" (Humaitá's mill). Catulo da Paixão Cearense argued to be the unique composer of the song, however, nowadays the credit is given to João Pernambuco (1883-1947). It is one of the most recorded Brazilian songs of all time.

== Lyrics ==
Não há, ó gente, ó não
Luar como esse do sertão
Não há, ó gente, ó não
Luar como esse do sertão

Oh! que saudade do luar da minha terra
Lá na serra branquejando folhas secas pelo chão
Este luar cá da cidade tão escuro
Não tem aquela saudade do luar lá do sertão

Não há, ó gente, ó não
Luar como esse do sertão
Não há, ó gente, ó não
Luar como esse do sertão

Se a lua nasce por detrás da verde mata
Mais parece um sol de prata prateando a solidão
E a gente pega na viola que ponteia
E a canção é a lua cheia a nos nascer do coração

Não há, ó gente, ó não
Luar como esse do sertão
Não há, ó gente, ó não
Luar como esse do sertão

Mas como é lindo ver depois por entre o mato
Deslizar calmo, regato, transparente como um véu
No leito azul das suas águas murmurando
E por sua vez roubando as estrelas lá do céu

Não há, ó gente, ó não
Luar como esse do sertão
Não há, ó gente, ó não
Luar como esse do sertão

== Controversy about the Authorship ==
The song might have its origins in the coco "É do Maitá" or "Engenho do Maitá", which has an anonymous author. This coco used to belong to João Pernambuco and it was supposedly transmitted to Catulo, according to the testimonies of celebrities such as Heitor Villa-Lobos, Mozart de Araújo, Sílvio Salema e Benjamin de Oliveira, published by Henrique Foréis Domingues in the book No tempo de Noel Rosa (In Noel Rosa's time).

João Pernambuco was a very humble man, who did not know how to read. He used to complain to be a victim of plagiarism from Catulo regarding the authorship of the song. According to Segundo Mozart Bicalho, Catulo said that Luar do Sertão was a northern melody, which belonged to the folklore domain. Catulo himself declared in an interview to Joel Silveira: "I composed Luar do Sertão listening to an old song (...)". The historian Ary Vasconcelos, in the work Panorama da música popular brasileira na belle époque (Panorama of Brazilian Popular Music in the belle époque), said that he had the opportunity to listen Luperce Miranda play two versions of the song: the original one and the one modified by João Pernambuco, which he concluded to be rather similar.

Leandro Carvalho, who studied João Pernambuco's work and organized a CD about him (João Pernambuco - O Poeta do Violão (1997)), declared: "wherever João walked, Catulo was right behind him annotating everything. That's what happened to Luar do Sertão: Catulo listened, changed the lyrics and said it was his."
