= Dino 7 Cordas =

Brazilian guitar player

- Born: Horondino José da Silva; 5 May 1918; Rio de Janeiro, Brazil
- Died: 26 May 2006 (aged 88) Rio de Janeiro, Brazil
- Genres: Choro, samba
- Instrument: Seven-string guitar

Horondino José da Silva (5 May 1918 – 26 May 2006), best known as Dino Sete Cordas ("Seven-String Dino"), was a Brazilian guitar player, playing primarily in the choro and samba styles. He is considered to be one of the leading performers of the Brazilian seven-string guitar. Appearing on recordings over the course of six decades, he worked with artists such as Pixinguinha, Carmen Miranda, Elis Regina, Cartola, Gilberto Gil, and more. His only recording as a lead collaborator was with the fellow 7-string guitar player Raphael Rabello.

== Discography (incomplete) ==
=== Albums ===
- 1991 - Raphael Rabello & Dino 7 Cordas (with Raphael Rabello) (Caju Music)
- 2001 - Cafe Brasil - Various Artists
- 2002 - Cafe Brasil 2 - Various Artists
