= Avenida Presidente Vargas =

Road in Rio de Janeiro, Brazil

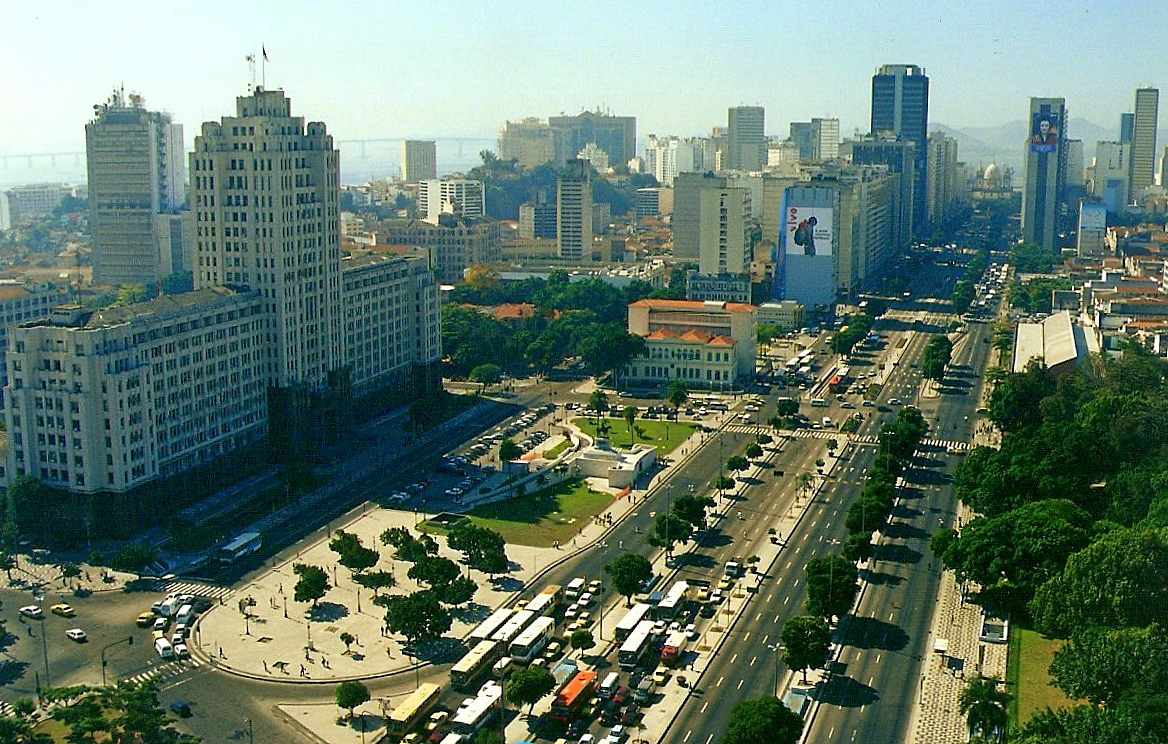
Avenida Presidente Vargas

The Avenida Presidente Vargas is one of the main throughways in the city of Rio de Janeiro. The road was designed by Getúlio Vargas, who was president of Brazil at the time, while the city of Rio de Janeiro was still the nation's federal capital.

The avenue connects the regions Leopoldina and Candelaria in downtown Rio de Janeiro (city) and is about 3.5 km long. It runs alongside several major landmarks in the city, including the Central do Brasil train station and the Campo de Santana park.

== History ==
The avenue was inaugurated in 1944. In the process of construction, many historical musical landmarks - most famously, Praça Onze de Junho—along with tenements and shacks that housed the red-light district in downtown Rio de Janeiro were demolished.
