= Frei Caneca Street =

Street in São Paulo, Brazil

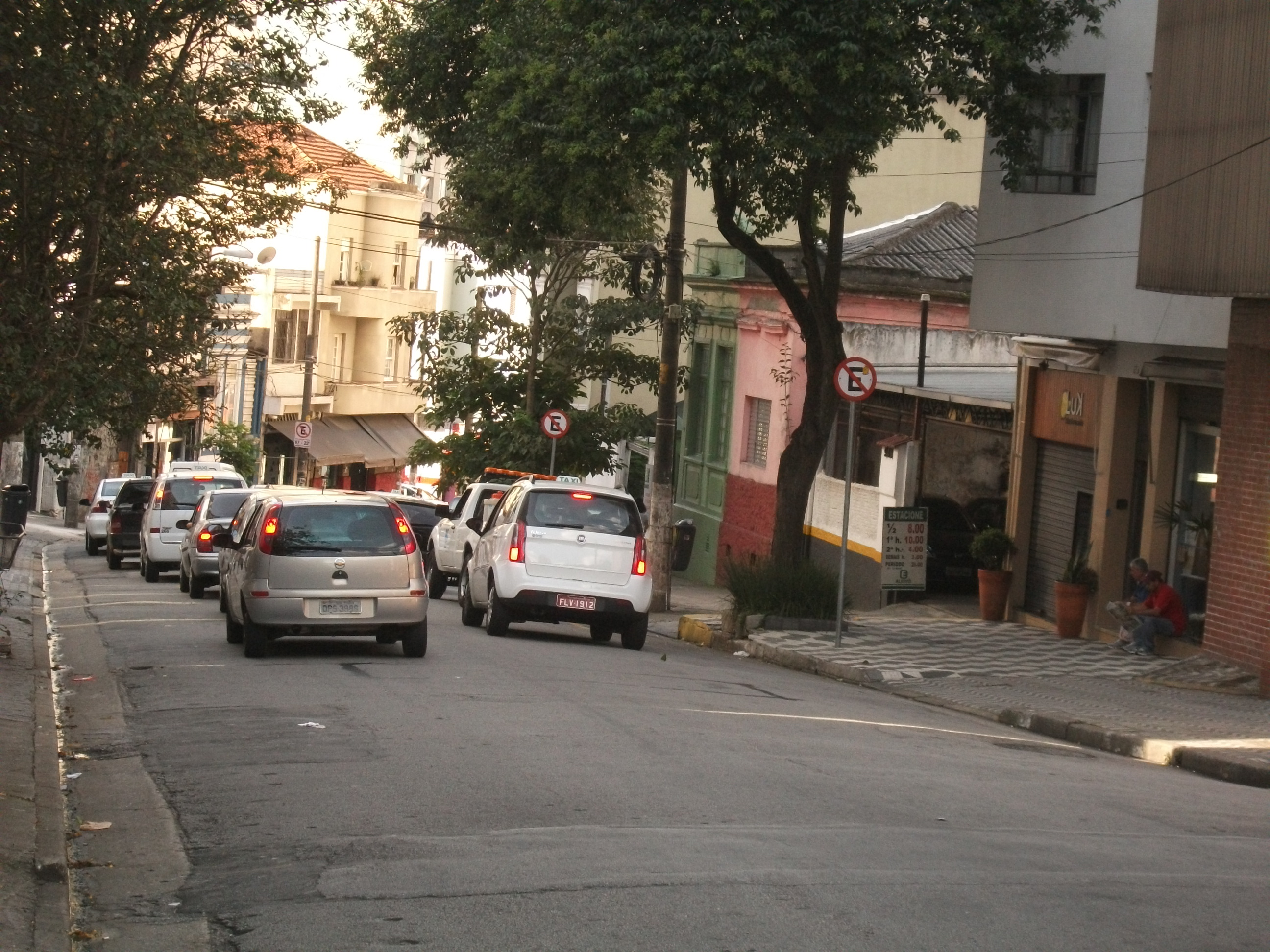
- Interactive map of Frei Caneca Street
- Native name: Rua Frei Caneca (Portuguese)
- Length: 1,500 m (4,900 ft)
- Location: São Paulo, Brazil
- Coordinates: 23.5543°S 46.6543°W
- East end: Rua Caio Prado, 363
- South end: Avenida Paulista, 1962

Frei Caneca Street (Portuguese: Rua Frei Caneca, Portuguese pronunciation: [ˌʁu.ɐ ˈfɾej kaˈnɛkɐ]) is an important LGBTQ Street in the city of São Paulo, Brazil, that starts at the Paulista Avenue and ends at Caio Prado Street. The street contains the famous gay nightclub A Loca and LGBT-friendly shopping at Frei Caneca .

== See also ==
- Gay village
- LGBT rights in Brazil
- LGBT rights in the World
