= Dilermando Reis =

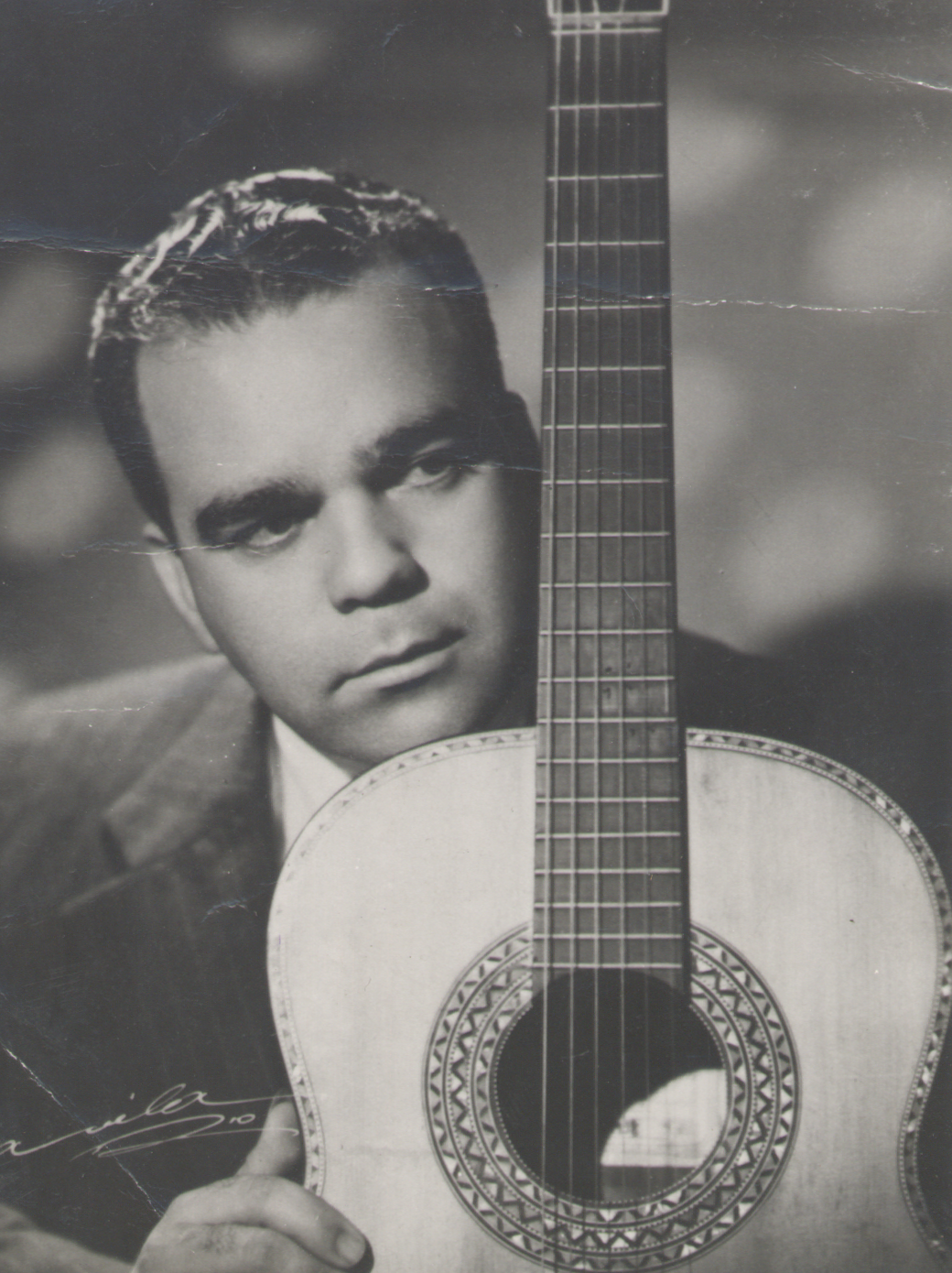

Background information
- Born: Dilermando dos Santos Reis; September 22, 1916; Guaratinguetá, São Paulo, Brazil
- Died: January 2, 1977 (aged 60) Rio de Janeiro, Rio de Janeiro, Brazil
- Genres: Choro, waltz
- Occupation(s): Musician, composer, arranger, music teacher
- Instrument: Classical guitar
- Years active: 1941–1977
- Labels: Columbia Records, Continental Records

Dilermando dos Santos Reis (September 22, 1916 – January 2, 1977) was a Brazilian musician, composer and music teacher.

He had former Brazilian president Juscelino Kubitschek's daughter as a student. Other students included Bola Sete, Nicanor Teixeira and Darcy Vila Verde.

Reis left 23 LPs as a soloist (often with unattributed accompaniment from Meira, and later Dino 7 Cordas) and seven accompanying the singer Francisco Petronio. David Russell has performed his works on guitar. Raphael Rabello recorded an entire CD of his work.
