= Catulo da Paixão Cearense =

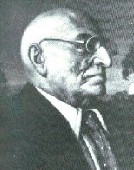
- Born: 8 October 1863; São Luís, Maranhão, Empire of Brazil
- Died: 10 May 1946 (aged 82); Rio de Janeiro, Brazil
- Occupations: Poet, theatre director, musician, composer, clockmaker

Catulo da Paixão Cearense (8 October 1863 – 10 May 1946), the Poeta do Sertão (Poet of the Sertão) was a Brazilian poet, theatre director, musician, and composer. He is considered one of the biggest composers in the history of Brazilian popular music during the 19th and 20th centuries. He was held in high esteem by various intellectuals for the beauty of his writings.

According to musicologist Zuza Homem de Mello, Catulo gained his nickname as the poet of the sertão, saying that he "introduced in his poetry the language inherited from what he had heard in his adolescence in the Northeast". In critic Murilo Araújo's understanding, "none of our poets had been so on point as to being inspired by the land".

== Biography ==
Oração à bandeira, 1937.

Catulo was born on 8 October 1863 in São Luís, the son of Amâncio José Paixão Cearense (from Ceará) and Maria Celestina Braga (from Maranhão). Though commonly believed to have been born on 31 January 1866, Catulo was born three years before and had his birth date changed so that he could be nominated for public service. He moved to Rio de Janeiro in 1880 at 17 years old with his family. He worked as a watchmaker. He met various singers of choro music of the time, such as Anacleto de Medeiros and Viriato Figueira da Silva, when he began making music. He became integrated into the Bohemian element of society, associating himself with bookseller Pedro da Silva Quaresma, owner of Livraria do Povo, which went on to edit in leaflets akin to Cordel, which was commonplace at the time.

At 19, Catulo interrupted his studies and embraced the guitar, an instrument that, at that time, commonplace in more modest homes. Initially a flute player, he traded it for the guitar, and as such, he would sing his modinhas. During this period, he went on to write and sing modinhas such as "Talento e Formosura", "Canção do Africano" and "Invocação a uma estrela". Catulo da Paixão Cearense would create collections, among them O cantor fluminense and O cancioneiro popular, along with his own works. He led a relaxed life due to his bohemian lifestyle, but died in poverty. Some of his compositions were collaborations with artistic partners such as Anacleto de Medeiros, Ernesto Nazareth, Chiquinha Gonzaga, Francisco Braga, and others. Catulo married, at 21 years old, Hermelinda Aires da Silva at Igreja Matriz de São João Batista da Lagoa on 27 September 1885.

Catulo was self-taught in his profession, saying that he "learned music like I learned to make verses, naturally". His first experiences in writing were taught by his mother and the culture of his mother was acquired in books that she bought and by his access to the Biblioteca do Senado do Império, for having been the teacher of the children of Gaspar da Silveira Martins. In 1908, he gave an audition at the Conservatório de Música do Rio de Janeiro. His most famous compositions included Luar do Sertão (in partnership with João Pernambuco) in 1914, considered by Pedro Lessa to be the national anthem of the Brazilian sertanejo, and the lyrics to Flor Amorosa, which had been composed by Joaquim Calado in 1867. He is also responsible for the rehabilitation of the guitar in the rooms of the high society in Rio and for reforms made to the "modinha".

His father died on 1 August 1885, displeased that his son had abandoned his studies to become a poet without being able to see the increasing popularity of the guitar that was representative of Catulo's career.

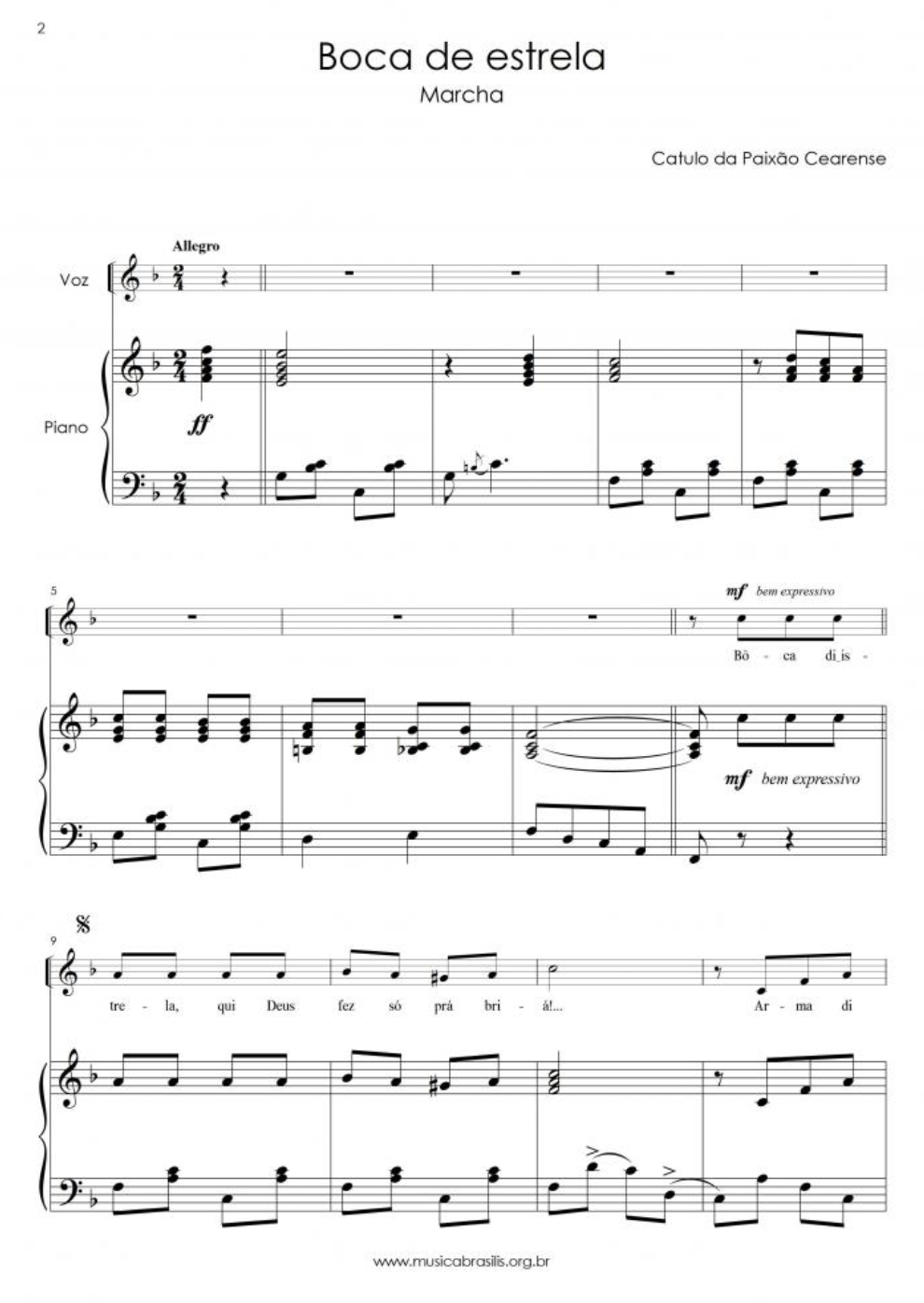
Boca de estrela (1st page) - Sheet music available at Portal Musica Brasilis

As he grew older, he only improved. Catulo did not change his music and stayed faithful to his style, saying that "with grammar or without, I am a great poet".

His house in the Engenho de Dentro neighborhood, at a time when the area was largely rural, is considered historical. He would receive his admirers, foreign writers, and Brazilian academics there, always with feasts with feijoada, while champagne never replaced the Brazilian rum (parati) regardless of how prominent the visitor was. His first famous modinha, "Ao Luar", was composed in 1880.

Catulo died at 82 years old on 10 May 1946, on Rua Francisca Meyer nº 78, house 2. His body was embalmed and displayed for public visitation until 13 May, when he was buried at São Francisco de Paula Cemetery, at Largo do Catumbi, to the sound of "Luar do Sertão".

== Bibliography ==
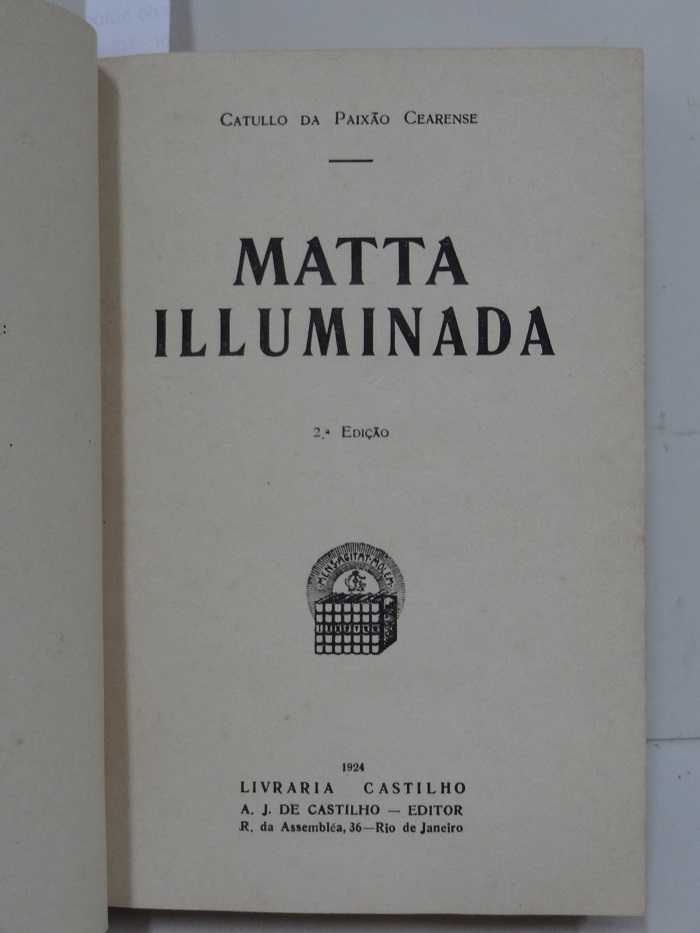
Matta Illuminada em edição de 1924.

- 1918 – Meu Sertão (Poesias)
- 1923 – Chôros ao Violão Novissima e Escolhida Colecção de Modinhas Brasileiras Contendo
- 1924 – Sertão em Flor
- 1927 – O evangelho das aves
- 1928 – Fábulas e Alegorias
- 1939 – O Sol e a Lua
- 1944 – Poemas Escolhidos
- 1965 – Luar do Sertão e Outros Poemas Escolhidos

== Discography ==
- 195? – "Catullo, o poeta do sertão" (Sinter • LP)
- 195? – Luar do Sertão (Sinter • 33/10 pol.)
- 1960 – Catullo (RCA Victor • 33/10 pol.)

== Theatre work ==
- “Um Boêmio no Céu”
