= Victor Assis Brasil =

Brazilian jazz saxophonist (1945–1981)

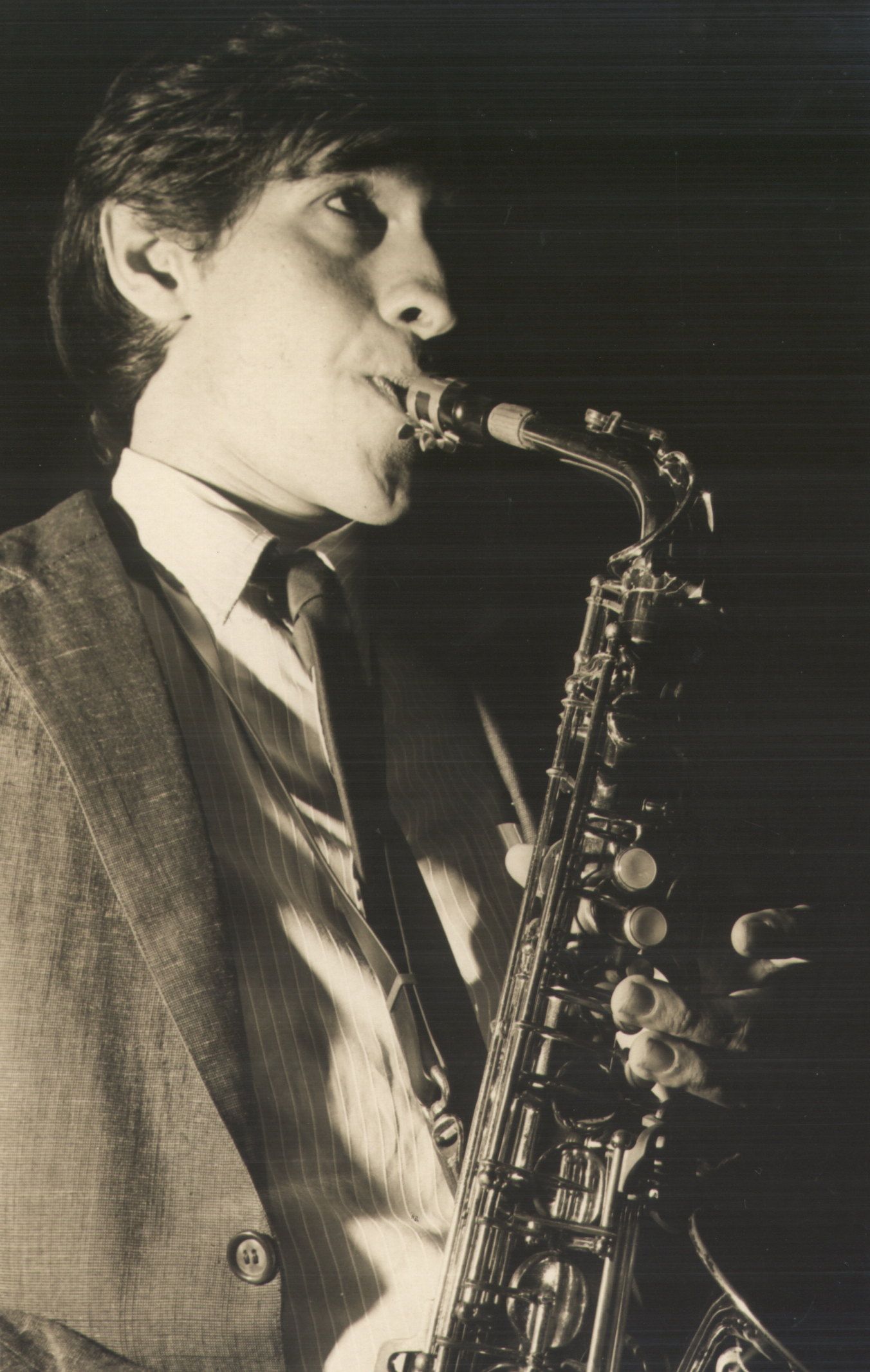
- Victor Assis Brasil
- Born: August 28, 1945; Rio de Janeiro, Brazil
- Died: April 14, 1981 (aged 35); Rio de Janeiro
- Occupation(s): Musician, composer

Victor Assis Brasil (August 28, 1945 – April 14, 1981) was a Brazilian jazz saxophonist. He began playing the saxophone at the age of 16 and recorded his first album, Desenhos, in 1965. He later studied at Berklee College of Music. He also toured on three continents.
