= Cidade Nova, Rio de Janeiro =

Neighborhood in Rio de Janeiro, Brazil

Cidade Nova
- Neighborhood
- Location in Rio de Janeiro Cidade Nova (Brazil)
- Coordinates: 22°54′36″S 43°12′09″W
- Country: Brazil
- State: Rio de Janeiro (RJ)
- Municipality/City: Rio de Janeiro
- Zone: Centro

Population (2010)
  - Total: 5,466

Cidade Nova is a middle-to-lower-class neighborhood in Rio de Janeiro, Brazil. It is located between the Centro and the North Zone. The Sambadrome Marquês de Sapucaí is situated within this neighborhood.
