= Raphael Rabello =

Background information
- Born: Raphael Baptista Rabello; October 31, 1962; Petrópolis, Rio de Janeiro, Brazil
- Died: April 27, 1995 (aged 32) Rio de Janeiro
- Genres: Bossa nova, choro, world music
- Occupation: Musician
- Instrument: Classical guitar
- Years active: 1974–1995
- Labels: Polygram, Barclay, Visom, Columbia, Caju, RCA, Chesky, RGE, Spotlight, Acari, GSP

Rafael Baptista Rabello (October 31, 1962 – April 27, 1995) was a virtuoso Brazilian guitarist and composer. During the 1980s and 1990s, he was considered one of the best acoustic guitar players in the world and played with many famous artists, such as Tom Jobim, Ney Matogrosso, Paulo Moura, and Paco de Lucia.

== Biography ==
=== Early years ===
Raphael Rabello was born in Petrópolis, Rio de Janeiro, Brazil. He was the youngest child of his family, which included many musicians. His sister Luciana was a well-known cavaquinho player and his other sister, Amélia, became a singer. His first guitar teacher was an older brother, Ruy Fabiano, when Raphael Rabello was seven years old. However, the biggest influence on Rabello starting his music studies was his grandfather, José de Queiroz Baptista, who was a choro guitar player.

He studied music theory with Maria Alice Salles, who also taught his brothers and sisters. In the 1970s, he took guitar lessons with Jaime Florence, the famous Meira, who had also taught Baden Powell in the 1940s. In the same period, he studied harmony with Ian Guest. Influenced by Dino 7 Cordas, Rabello eventually switched to the Brazilian seven-string guitar and started playing professionally when he was a teenager.

=== Early musical career ===
His first recording as a sideman was at age 14 on a recording of choro music by classical guitarist Turibio Santos. In this period, he took lessons from guitarist Dino 7 Cordas (Dino 7 strings), with whom he recorded an LP in 1991.

In 1976, he founded the group Os Carioquinhas, with his sister Luciana Rabello (cavaquinho), Paulo Alves (mandolin), Téo (acoustic guitar) and Mario Florêncio (tambourine). The band became famous and played with many other choro groups, such as Época de Ouro and Quinteto Villa-Lobos. They also recorded one album in 1977.

In 1979, Rabello became a member of Camerata Carioca. This was the period in which he met Radamés Gnattali, who became a partner of Rabello. They recorded one disc together in 1984. Three years later, Rabello also recorded a tribute album to Gnattali.

Between 1980 and 1981, Rabello became a studio musician and started recording with many singers and instrumentalists. In this same period, he started his career as an arranger, working for the group Galo Preto.

=== Later career and success ===
His most productive years spanned 1982 to 1995. He was considered by many to be one of the finest guitarists of his generation. He played in many different styles, but specialized in choro. His first album was released in 1982 and, influenced by Dino 7 Cordas, Rabello adopted the name 'Raphael 7 Cordas', which was also the name of his first record. However, he did not use this nickname for very long.

Throughout his career, Rabello recorded 16 albums, some of them in collaboration with other artists, such as Dino 7 Cordas, Elizeth Cardoso and Paulo Moura. He also participated on about 600 albums, recording in Brazil and abroad. He participated in concerts and recordings with a number of well-known Brazilian musicians, such as Tom Jobim, Ney Matogrosso, Jaques Morelenbaum and Paulo Moura, as well as international players, such as Paco de Lucia.

Rabello also became famous abroad. He performed shows in Italy, Switzerland, Argentina, Chile, Mexico, Portugal, France, Canada and the United States. In 1994, he moved to the U.S. and met Laurindo Almeida, who helped to spread his work around the world. There, he also gave guitar lessons in Los Angeles. At the end of the same year, he returned to Brazil to participate in the project "Orgulho do Brasil", which had the goal of recording songs composed by the most notable artists of that country. In this project, he recorded a tribute to Capiba, which was released in 2002.

=== Final years ===
In 1989, Rabello was involved in a serious car accident and suffered multiple fractures in his right arm. After a delicate surgery, he recovered and returned to playing months later. However, during the surgery, he contracted HIV in a blood transfusion. Hopeless, he became addicted to alcohol and drugs. On April 27, 1995, Rafael Rabello died of cardiac dysrhythmia followed by respiratory arrest.

== Legacy ==
Rabello has had two full-length CDs released posthumously and a choro school was named after him.

His latest posthumous release is the project he was working on when he died: a tribute to Lourenço da Fonseca Barbosa, known as Capiba (1904–1997). He was one of the arrangers, is credited as producer, played a lot of the guitar and even sang on one of the tracks. The guest-singer list is a veritable "who's who" of Brazilian singers: Chico Buarque, Paulinho da Viola, Gal Costa, Caetano Veloso, Maria Bethânia, Alceu Valença, João Bosco, and Ney Matogrosso.

== Discography ==
- 1982: Rafael Sete Cordas (Polygram)
- 1984: Tributo a Garoto (Barclay), with Radamés Gnattali
- 1987: Interpreta Radamés Gnattali (Visom)
- 1988: Rafael Rabello (Visom)
- 1990: A flor da pele (Polygram/Philips), with Ney Matogrosso
- 1991: Todo sentimento (Columbia), with Elizeth Cardoso
- 1991: Raphael Rabello & Dino 7 Cordas (Caju Music), with Dino 7 Cordas
- 1992: Dois irmãos (Caju Music), with Paulo Moura
- 1992: Todos os tons (RCA)
- 1992: Shades of Rio (Chesky), with Romero Lubambo
- 1993: Delicatesse (RCA), with Déo Rian
- 1994: Relendo Dilermando Reis (RGE)
- 1997: Em concerto (Spotlight), with Armandinho
- 2001: Todas as canções (Acari), with Amélia Rabello
- 2002: Mestre Capiba por Raphael Rabello e Convidados (Acari)
- 2005: Cry my guitar (GSP)
