= Oito Batutas =

Brazilian choro band

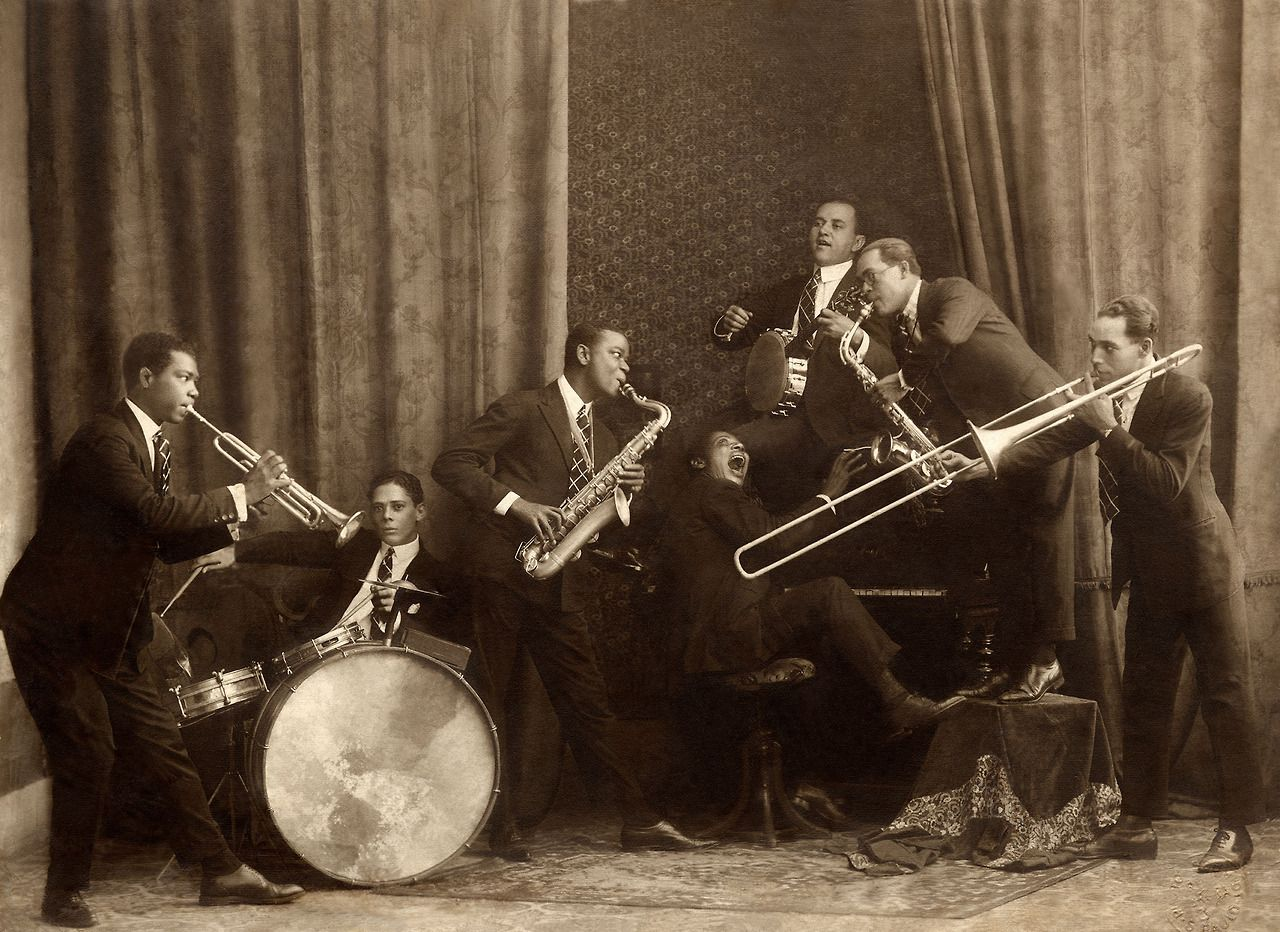
Oito Batutas, c. 1920

Oito Batutas have been deemed to be one of the most influential groups on Brazilian music. They were led by Pixinguinha with whom they debuted on April 7, 1919 at the Cinema Palais in Rio de Janeiro.
