= Pixinguinha =

Brazilian composer (1897–1973)

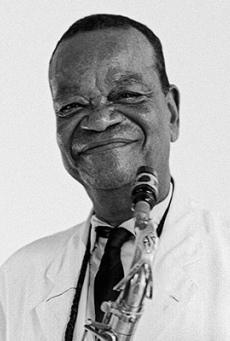

Background information
- Also known as: Pizinguim, Bexiguinha, Pexinguinha, Pixinguinha
- Born: Alfredo da Rocha Viana Filho; May 4, 1897
- Origin: Rio de Janeiro, Brazil
- Died: February 17, 1973 (aged 75)
- Genres: Choro, Maxixe, Samba, Waltz, Jazz
- Occupations: Songwriter, composer, arranger, instrumentalist
- Instruments: Saxophone, flute
- Years active: 1911–1973
- Website: pixinguinha.com.br

Alfredo da Rocha Viana Filho (May 4, 1897 – February 17, 1973), better known as Pixinguinha, (Portuguese: [piʃĩˈɡiɲɐ]) was a Brazilian composer, arranger, flutist, and saxophonist born in Rio de Janeiro. He worked with Brazilian popular music and developed the choro, a genre of Brazilian music that blends Afro-Brazilian rhythms with European influences. Some of his compositions include "Carinhoso", "Glória", "Lamento", and "Um a Zero".

Pixinguinha merged the traditional music of 19th-century composers with modern jazz-inspired harmonies, sophisticated arrangements, and Afro-Brazilian rhythms. This is attributed as having helped establish choro as an aspect of Brazilian culture.

Pixinguinha was among the first Brazilian musicians to embrace radio broadcasting and studio recording, technologies that played a key role in bringing his music to a broader audience.

== Early life and career ==
Pixinguinha was born to musician Alfredo da Rocha Viana, a flutist with an extensive collection of choro music scores and regularly hosted musical gatherings in his house. In 1912, Pixinguinha began performing in cabarets and theatrical revues in Rio de Janeiro’s Lapa district. He later became a flutist for the house orchestra at the Cine Rio Branco movie theater, where live music accompanied silent films. In 1914, Pixinguinha and his friends João Pernambuco and Donga formed a band called Caxangá, which gathered attention until it disbanded in 1919.

== The Eight Batons ==
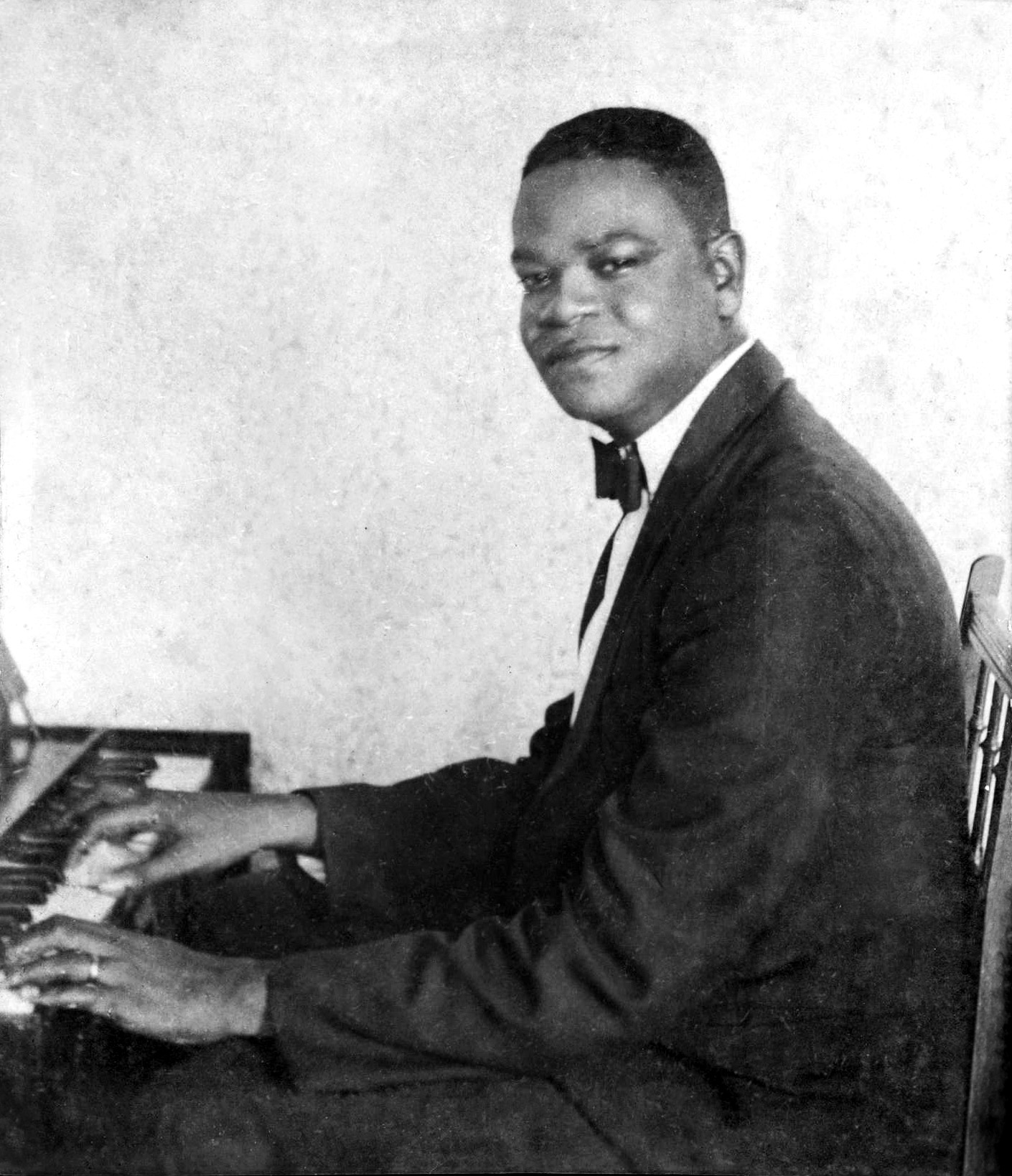
Pixinguinha in his youth.

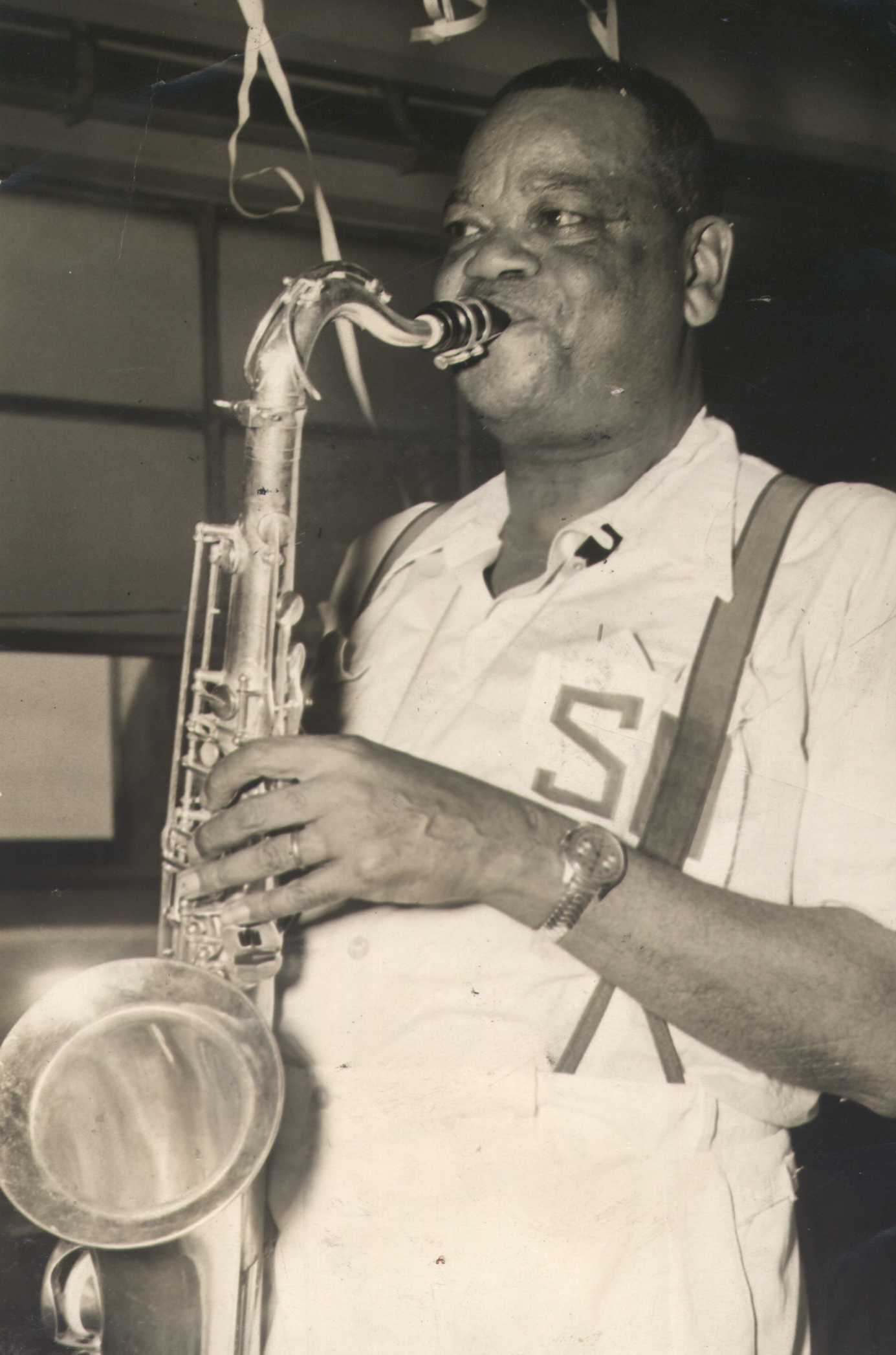
Pixinguinha playing saxophone

In 1919, Pixinguinha, along with his brother and other musicians formed the musical group called Os Oito Batutas (lit. 'The Eight Amazing Players'). The instrumental lineup was initially traditional, dominated by a rhythm section of string instruments: Pixinguinha's flute, guitars, cavaquinho, banjo cavaquinho, and hand percussion. Performing in the lobby of the Cine Palais movie theater, the band's music soon became more popular than the films themselves. Their repertoire was diverse, encompassing folk music from northeast Brazil, sambas, maxixes, waltzes, polkas, and "Brazilian tangos" (the term choro was not yet established as a genre). The band appealed to the nationalistic desires of upper-class Brazilians, who were in support of what was considered to be uniquely Brazilian traditional music, free from foreign influences. Os Oito Batutas became a sensation across Brazil, despite facing disapproval from the white Rio elite against black men performing in popular venues.

Os Oito Batutas and Pixinguinha's music provoked controversy about race and the influence of Europe and the United States on Brazilian music. The band had white and black musicians and performed mainly in upper-class venues where black artists had previously been prohibited. Moreover, they were criticized by people who believed that Brazilian musical culture should primarily reflect its European roots and by those repelled by their music's diversity. Some critics claimed that Pixinguinha's compositional style and instrumental incorporation of trumpets and saxophones were negatively influenced by American jazz.

After performing a gig for Duque and Gabi, a dance duo, at the Assírio cabaret, Os Oito Batutas were discovered by Arnaldo Guinle, who sponsored their first European tour in 1921. In Paris, they served as ambassadors for Brazilian music, performing for six months at the Schéhérazade cabaret. Their tour was a success and Pixinguinha received praise from many Parisian musical artists, including Harold de Bozzi. Upon returning to Brazil, they toured in Buenos Aires, where they made recordings for RCA Victor.

Pixinguinha returned from Paris with a broadened musical perspective. He began to incorporate jazz standards and ragtime music into his band's repertoire, changing the lineup dramatically by adding saxophones, trumpets, trombones, piano, and a drum kit. The name of the musical group was changed to simply Os Batutas to reflect the new sound.

== Orquestra Victor Brasileira ==
O Urubu e o Gavião
Choro "O Urubu e o Gavião" (or "Urubu Malandro"), recorded in 1930 with Pixinguinha on the flute.

1 x 0
Choro "1 x 0" (or "Um a zero"), composed by Pixinguinha and Benedito Lacerda. Played by Pixinguinha (saxophone) and Benedito Lacerda (flute).

Sofres porque queres
Choro Sofres porque queres, recorded in 1919 with Pixinguinha on the flute.

Atraente
Choro (maxixe) "Atraente", composed by Chiquinha Gonzaga, recorded by Pixinguinha (saxophone) and Benedito Lacerda (flute).

Aguenta, seu Fulgêncio
Choro "Aguenta, seu Fulgêncio", composed by Lourenço Lamartine and played by Pixinguinha (flute) and Lourenço Lamartine. Recorded in 1929.

In the late 1920s, Pixinguinha was hired by RCA Victor label (currently known as RCA Records) to lead the Orquestra Victor Brasileira (Brazilian Victor Orchestra). Working there refined his skills as an arranger. At the time, it was common for Choro musicians to improvise their parts based on a simple piano score. However, the growing demand for radio music played by large ensembles required sheets to be written for every instrument, which was something Pixinguinha could make happen. During his arranging career, he created some of his most famous compositions, which were popularized by singers of that time such as Francisco Alves and Mário Reis.

== Lacerda's conjunto regional ==
In 1939 he was succeeded by composer Radamés Gnattali. Pixinguinha left Orquestra Victor Brasileira to join flautist Benedito Lacerda's band, where he played the tenor saxophone as his primary instrument and continued to compose music.

Lacerda's band was a conjunto regional (or just regional, meaning "regional band"), the name given to in-house bands hired by radio stations to perform music and accompany singers, often live in front of a studio audience. Throughout the 30s and 40s regionals provided steady employment to choro musicians of that time and led to the professionalization of the Brazilian music industry. With Lacerda, Pixinguinha started another period of composing and recording music. Due to economic issues and the fact that the regionals fell out of favor during the late 40s, Pixinguinha had to sell the rights to his compositions to Benedito Lacerda. For this reason, Benedito Lacerda is credited as the co-composer on many of Pixinguinha's tunes, even those composed while Lacerda was a young boy. Pixinguinha played supporting parts on the saxophone for the recordings with Lacerda. Lacerda plays the flute parts written and meant to be played by Pixinguinha.

== Retirement and death ==
By the mid-1950s, the change of musical preferences of the audience and the emerging popularity of samba, bolero and bossa nova in Brazil led to the decline of choro, as the other genres dominated the radio. Pixinguinha spent his last years in retirement, appearing in public only on rare occasions (such as the "Evening of Choro" TV programs produced by Jacob do Bandolim in 1955 and 1956).

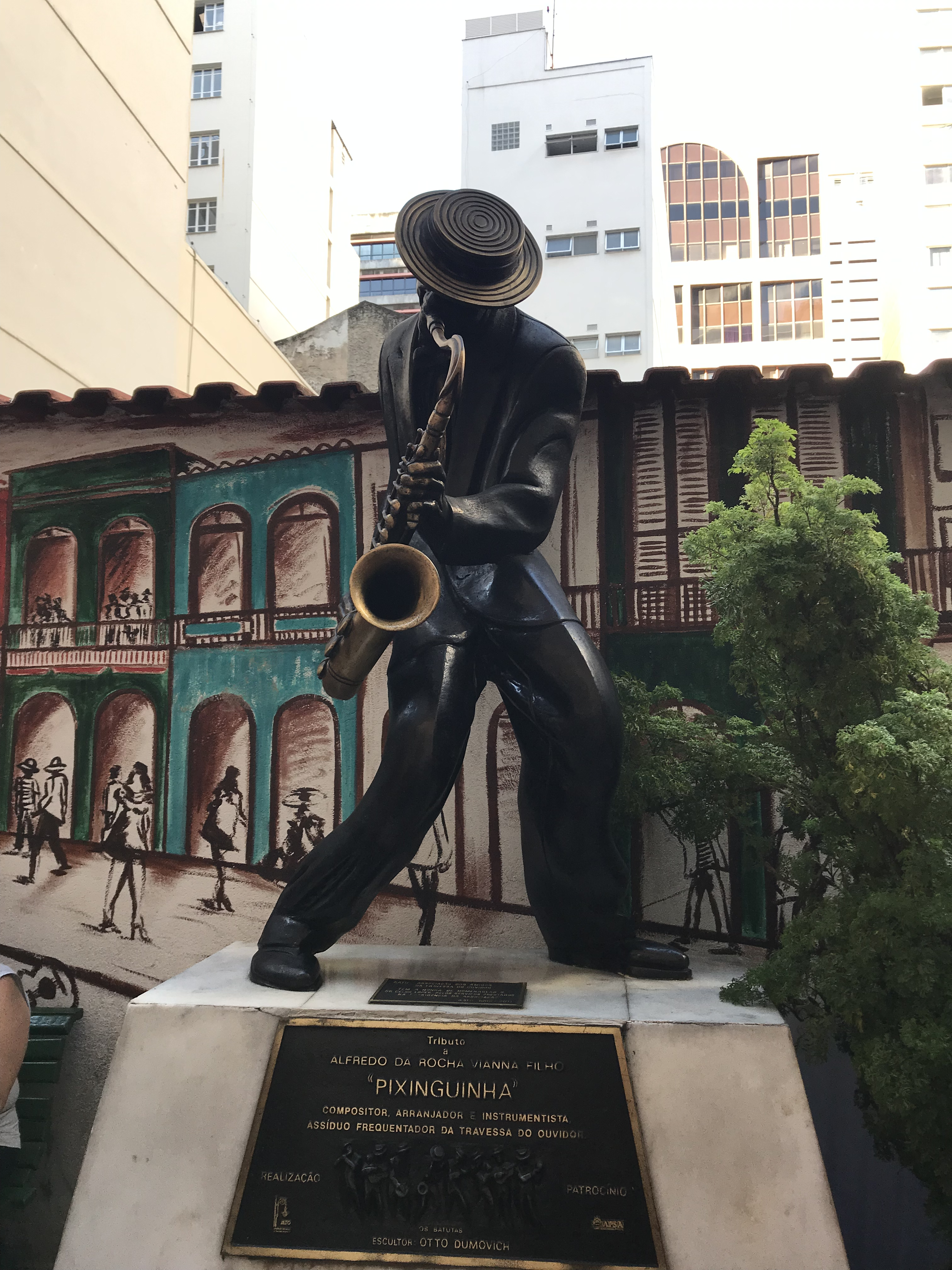
Statue of Pixinguinha in Rio de Janeiro, Brazil.

Pixinguinha died on February 17, 1973, in the Church of Nossa Senhora da Paz in Ipanema while attending a baptism. He was buried in the cemetery of Inhaúma. April 23rd which was believed to be his birthday, is now celebrated as the National Day of Choro in Brazil. This was officially established in 2000 after a campaign by bandolim player Hamilton de Holanda and his students at the Raphael Rabello School of Choro. In November 2016, however, it was discovered that Pixinguinha's actual date of birth was May 4, not April 23. Despite this fact, Brazil's National Day of Choro remains on April 23rd.

In 2013, his 117th birthday was honored with a Google Doodle.

A bronze statue of Pixinguinha was unveiled in 1996. It stands near the now-defunct Gouveia bar, where he often performed.

Pixinguinha is depicted in the 2021 biographical film Pixinguinha, Um Homem Carinhoso. He was portrayed by Brazilian actor Seu Jorge.

== Musical contributions ==
Pixinguinha's compositions are critically acclaimed for their sophisticated use of harmony, rhythm, and counterpoint. Although many of his early compositions were intended to be played on the piano, Pixinguinha's later works take full advantage of the larger musical groups (regionais) that he worked with, incorporating intricate melodic lines, brass instrumentation, contrapuntal bass lines, and syncopated rhythms. Pixinguinha was one of the first band leaders to regularly include several Afro-Brazilian percussion instruments, such as the pandeiro and afoxé, that have now become standard in choro and samba music.

His arrangements were likely influenced by the sounds of ragtime and the American jazz bands that became popular early in his career. When he released "Lamentos" in 1928 and "Carinhoso" in 1930, Pixinguinha was criticized for incorporating too many jazz elements into his compositions. These pieces have since become respected parts of the choro canon.

== Pixinguinha's compositions ==
- A pombinha (com Donga)
- A vida é um buraco
- Aberlado
- Abraçando Jacaré
- Acerta o passo
- Aguenta, seu Fulgêncio (com Lourenço Lamartine)
- Ai, eu queria (com Vidraça)
- Ainda existe
- Ainda me recordo
- Amigo de povo
- Assim é que é
- Benguelê
- Bianca (com Andreoni)
- Buquê de flores (com W. Falcão)
- Cafezal em flor (com Eugênio Fonseca)
- Carinhos
- Carinhoso (com João de Barro)
- Carnavá tá aí (com Josué de Barros)
- Casado na orgia (com João da Baiana)
- Casamento do coronel Cristino
- Céu do Brasil (com Gomes Filho)
- Chorei
- Chorinho no parque São Jorge (com Salgado Filho)
- Cochichando (com João de Barro e Alberto Ribeiro)
- Conversa de crioulo (com Donga e João de Baiana)
- Dança dos ursos
- Dando topada
- Desprezado
- Displicente
- Dominante
- Dominó
- Encantadora
- Estou voltando
- Eu sou gozado assim
- Fala baixinho (com Hermínio Bello de Carvalho)
- Festa de branco (com Baiano)
- Foi muamba (com Índio)
- Fonte abandonada (com Índio)
- Fraternidade
- Gargalhada
- Gavião calçudo (com Cícero de Almeida)
- Glória
- Guiomar (com Baiano)
- Há! hu! lá! ho! (com Donga e João da Baiana)
- Harmonia das flores (com Hermínio Bello de Carvalho)
- Hino a Ramos
- Infantil
- Iolanda
- Isso é que é viver (com Hermínio Bello de Carvalho)
- Isto não se faz (com Hermínio Bello de Carvalho)
- Já andei (com Donga e João da Baiana)
- Já te digo (com China)
- Jardim de Ilara (com C. M. Costal)
- Knock-out
- Lamento
- Lamentos (com Vinícius de Moraes)
- Lá-ré
- Leonor
- Levante, meu nego
- Lusitânia (com F. G. D. )
- Mais quinze dias
- Mama, meu netinho (com Jararaca)
- Mamãe Isabé (com João da Baiana)
- Marreco quer água
- Meu coração não te quer (com E. Almeida)
- Mi tristezas solo iloro
- Mulata baiana (com Gastão Vianna)
- Mulher boêmia
- Mundo melhor (com Vinícius de Moraes)
- Não gostei dos teus olhos (com João da Baiana)
- Não posso mais
- Naquele tempo (com Benedito Lacerda e Reginaldo Bessa)
- Nasci pra domador (com Valfrido Silva)
- No elevador
- Noite e dia (com W. Falcão)
- Nostalgia ao luar
- Número um
- O meu conselho
- Os batutas (com Duque)
- Os cinco companheiros
- Os home implica comigo (com Carmen Miranda)
- Onde foi Isabé
- Oscarina
- Paciente
- Página de dor (com Índio)
- Papagaio sabido (com C. Araújo)
- Patrão, prenda seu gado (com Donga e João da Baiana)
- Pé de mulata
- Poema de raça (com Z. Reis e Benedito Lacerda)
- Poética
- Por você fiz o que pude (com Beltrão)
- Pretensiosa
- Promessa
- Que perigo
- Que querê (com Donga e João da Baiana)
- Quem foi que disse
- Raiado (com Gastão Vianna)
- Rancho abandonado (com Índio)
- Recordando
- Rosa (com Otávio de Sousa)
- Rosa
- Samba de fato (com Baiano)
- Samba de nego
- Samba do urubu
- Samba fúnebre (com Vinícius de Moraes)
- Samba na areia
- Sapequinha
- Saudade do cavaquinho (com Muraro)
- Seresteiro
- Sofres porque queres
- Solidão
- Sonho da Índia (com N. N. e Duque)
- Stella (com de Castro e Sousa)
- Teu aniversário
- Teus ciúmes
- Triangular
- Tristezas não pagam dívidas
- Um a zero (com Benedito Lacerda)
- Um caso perdido
- Uma festa de Nanã (com Gastão Vianna) * Urubu
- Vamos brincar
- Variações sobre o urubu e o gavião
- Vem cá! não vou!
- Vi o pombo gemê (com Donga e João da Baiana)
- Você é bamba (com Baiano)
- Você não deve beber (com Manuel Ribeiro)
- Vou pra casa
- Xou Kuringa (com Donga e João da Baiana)
- Yaô africano (com Gastão Vianna)
- Zé Barbino (com Jararaca)
- Proezas de Solon
- Vou Vivendo

== See also ==
- Afro-Brazilians
- Choro

== Bibliography ==
- Choro: a social history of a Brazilian popular music. Tamara Elena Livingston-Isenhour and Thomas George Caracas Garcia. Indiana University Press, 2005, pp. 91–98.
