= 2019 Multishow Brazilian Music Awards =

26th edition of the Multishow Brazilian Music Awards held in 2019

- Date: 29 October 2019
- Location: Jeunesse Arena; Rio de Janeiro, Rio de Janeiro, Brazil
- Hosted by: Anitta; Paulo Gustavo

Highlights
- Most awards: Anitta; Ludmilla (2 each)
- Most nominations: Anitta; Marília Mendonça (4 each)
- Website: gshow.globo.com/multishow/premio-multishow

Television/radio coverage
- Network: Multishow

The 2019 Multishow Brazilian Music Awards (Portuguese: Prêmio Multishow de Música Brasileira 2019) (or simply 2019 Multishow Awards) (Portuguese: Prêmio Multishow 2019) was held on 29 October 2019, at the Jeunesse Arena in Rio de Janeiro, Brazil. Singer Anitta and television presenter Paulo Gustavo hosted the show. Anitta and Marília Mendonça led the nominations with four each. Anitta also received the most awards with Ludmilla, receiving two awards each.

== Performances ==
=== Pre-show ===
List of performers at the premiere ceremony
Artist(s)	Song(s)
Gaby Amarantos Seu Jorge	"La Vie en rose"
Lexa	"Sapequinha"
Day Carol Biazin	"Tanto Faz" "Ser"
Lexa Pedro Sampaio	"Chama Ela"
Kevin o Chris	Medley "Evoluiu" "Ela é do Tipo"
Felipe Araújo Ferrugem	"Atrasadinha"
Yasmin Santos	"Saudades Nível Hard"
Felipe Araújo	Tribute to Gabriel Diniz "Jenifer"
Gloria Groove	"YoYo"
Luísa Sonza	"Fazendo Assim"
Lexa Gloria Groove	"Provocar"

=== Main ceremony ===
List of performers at the 2019 Multishow Brazilian Music Awards
Artist(s)	Song(s)
Iza Ivete Sangalo	"Brisa" "Mainha Gosta Assim"
Anitta Kevinho MC Zaac Tropkillaz	"Terremoto" "Bola Rebola" (contains elements of "Faz Gostoso", "Banana" and "Vai Malandra")
Márcia Fellipe Jerry Smith	"Quem Me Dera"
Zé Neto & Cristiano	"Largado às traças" "Ferida Curada"
Léo Santana	"Santinha" "Contatinho"
Melim	"Dois Corações" "Meu Abrigo" "Ouvi Dizer"
Ludmilla	Medley: "Vem Amor" "Solta a Batida" "Flash" "Favela Chegou"
Marília Mendonça	"Música do Leo"
Baco Exu do Blues Péricles	"Flamingos"
Marília Mendonça Anitta	"Some Que Ele Vem Atrás"

== Winners and nominees ==
Nominations were announced on 29 July 2019. Marília Mendonça and Anitta led the nominations with four each. Anitta and Ludmilla won the most awards of the night with two each. Winners are listed first and in bold.

=== Voted categories ===
The winners of the following categories were chosen by fan votes.

Female Singer of the Year	Male Singer of the Year
**Ludmilla**; Anitta; Ivete Sangalo; Iza; Marília Mendonça	**Dilsinho**; Ferrugem; Gabriel Diniz; Gusttavo Lima; Wesley Safadão
Group of the Year	Duo of the Year
**Atitude 67**; BaianaSystem; Melim; Sorriso Maroto; Turma do Pagode	**Zé Neto & Cristiano**; Anavitória; Jorge & Mateus; Matheus & Kauan; Simone & Simaria
Song of the Year	Earworm of the Year
**"Atrasadinha" – Felipe Araújo featuring Ferrugem**; "Dona de Mim" – Iza; "Jenifer" – Gabriel Diniz; "Péssimo Negócio" – Dilsinho; "Todo Mundo Vai Sofrer" – Marília Mendonça	**"Onda Diferente" – Anitta, Ludmilla and Snoop Dogg featuring Papatinho**; "Atrasadinha" – Felipe Araújo featuring Ferrugem; "Jenifer" – Gabriel Diniz; "Medley da Gaiola" – Kevin o Chris and Dennis DJ; "Bola Rebola" – Tropkillaz, J Balvin and Anitta featuring MC Zaac
Show of the Year	Fiat Argo Experimente
**Marília Mendonça**; BaianaSystem; Gusttavo Lima; Thiaguinho; Tribalistas	**Lagum**; Duda Beat; Jão; Malía; Vitão
TVZ Music Video of the Year
**"Terremoto" – Anitta and Kevinho (Director: João Papa)**; "Amor Bandido" – Lexa and MC Kekel (Director: Os Primos); "Bem Pior Que Eu" – Marília Mendonça (Director: Fernando Trevisan Catatau); "Garupa" – Luísa Sonza and Pabllo Vittar (Director: Os Primos); "Vingança" – Luan Santana featuring MC Kekel (Director: Joana Mazzucchelli)

=== Professional categories ===
The winners of the following categories were chosen by Multishow Award Academy.

Song of the Year	Album of the Year	New Artist of the Year
**"Hoje Eu Vou Parar Na Gaiola"** – MC Livinho featuring DJ Rennan da Penha; "AmarElo" – Emicida featuring Majur and Pabllo Vittar; "Sulamericano" – BaianaSystem	**Abaixo de Zero: Hello Hell** – Black Alien; O Futuro Não Demora – BaianaSystem; Ladrão – Djonga	**Duda Beat**; Josyara; MC Tha
