= Sambista Perfeito =

Studio album by Arlindo Cruz
- Released: October 22, 2007
- Recorded: 2007
- Genres: samba; Pagode
- Length: 59:00
- Language: Portuguese
- Label: Deckdisc
- Producer: Marcos Sales

Arlindo Cruz chronology
Arlindinho (1993)	Sambista Perfeito (2007)	Batuques e Romances (2011)

Sambista Perfeito is the second studio album by Brazilian singer-songwriter Arlindo Cruz, released on October 22, 2007, by the Deckdisc label. It was nominated for the 2008 Latin Grammy Award for Best Samba/Pagode Album.

== Background ==
The first solo studio album by Brazilian samba musician Arlindo Cruz was Arlindinho released in 1993. In 2003, he released his first solo live album, Pagode de Arlindo. After fourteen years, Arlindo returned to the studio to record a new solo album of original songs. Released by the Deckdisc label, the album featured compositions by various samba artists and collaborators of Arlindo Cruz, including names such as Nei Lopes, Xande de Pilares, Zeca Pagodinho, Neguinho da Beija-Flor, and Marcelo D2. Singer Maria Rita participated in the recording of the album, performing a duet with Arlindo on the track O Que é o Amor. The event also featured the participation of the “Velhas Guardas” from two major samba schools in Rio de Janeiro, Portela and Império Serrano.

== Track listing ==
No.	Title	Writer(s)	Featured artist(s)	Length
1.	"Meu Lugar"	Arlindo Cruz, Mauro Diniz		4:52
2.	"Amor Com Certeza"	Arlindo Cruz, Babi, Júnior Dom		4:01
3.	"Se Eu Encontrar Com Ela"	Arlindo Cruz, Zeca Pagodinho	Velha Guarda Do Império Serrano, Velha Guarda da Portela, Zeca Pagodinho	3:43
4.	"Sambista Perfeito"	Arlindo Cruz, Nei Lopes		3:46
5.	"O Que É o Amor"	Arlindo Cruz, Maurição, Fred Camacho	Maria Rita	3:32
6.	"Quem Gosta de Mim"	Arlindo Cruz, Franco Lattari		4:19
7.	"A Rosa - Flor Que Não Se Cheira"	Darcy Maravilha, Luiz Carlos De Paula	Sereno	4:33
8.	"Nos Braços da Batucada"	Arlindo Cruz, Júnior Dom, Babi		3:42
9.	"O Amor"	Arlindo Cruz, Pezinho		3:39
10.	"O Brasil É Isso Aí"	Arlindo Cruz, Marcelo D2, Júnior Dom	Marcelo D2	4:42
11.	"Minha Porta-Bandeira"	Neném Chamma, Julinho Santos		4:11
12.	"Pára De Paradinha"	Arlindo Cruz, Marcelinho Moreira, Fred Camacho		3:56
13.	"Sujeito Enjoado"	Arlindo Cruz, Xande de Pilares, Maurição	Xande de Pilares	3:55
14.	"Entra No Clima"	Arlindo Cruz, Acyr Marques, Rogê		4:07
15.	"O Que É o Amor" (bonus track)	Arlindo Cruz, Maurição, Fred Camacho		3:34
Total length:				1:00:32

== Release ==
The album was released on CD in October 22, 2007. There was an album release party at the Fnac bookstore in Barra da Tijuca, Rio de Janeiro.

== Reception ==
=== Prizes ===
In 2008, the album was nominated for a Latin Grammy in the Best Samba/Pagode Album category. At a ceremony held at the Toyota Center in Houston, Texas, the album was passed over after the award was split between Paulinho da Viola’s Acústico MTV and Maria Rita’s Samba Meu.

Year	Award	Category	Venue	Result	Ref.
2008	Latin Grammy Award	Best Samba/Pagode Album	Toyota Center, Houston, Texas United States	Nominated	

== Legacy ==
In an August 2025 article in the São Paulo newspaper Folha de S. Paulo, Lucâs Breda states that this album marks the “beginning of the peak of his career, which also includes the two volumes of MTV ao Vivo: Arlindo Cruz from 2009 and the 2011 album Batuques e Romances". Breda also noted, “Before Arlindo Cruz released the album Sambista Perfeito, his life was full of imperfections. He was going through ups and downs in his marriage to Babi Cruz, struggling with a cocaine addiction, and lacked the recognition that his previous career suggested. “I think there’s a gap in samba that I, as a complete artist, need to fill,” he told the newspaper O Samba in late 2007, at the album’s release concert. “I’m highly respected as a songwriter, musician, and party starter, and with this album, I think I’ll reach the place I deserve".
