= Latin Grammy Award for Best Samba/Pagode Album =

Latin Grammy Award category

- Awarded for: Vocal or instrumental Samba/Pagode albums containing at least 51% playing time of newly recorded material. For Solo artists, duos or groups.
- Country: United States
- Presented by: The Latin Recording Academy
- First award: 2000
- Currently held by: Sorriso Maroto for Sorriso Eu Gosto No Pagode Vol. 3 - Homenagem Ao Fundo De Quintal (Gravado Em Londres) (2025)
- Website: latingrammy.com

The Latin Grammy Award for Best Samba/Pagode Album is an honor presented annually at the Latin Grammy Awards, a ceremony that recognizes excellence and creates a wider awareness of cultural diversity and contributions of Latin recording artists in the United States and internationally. The award has been presented since the 1st Annual Latin Grammy Awards in 2000.

According to the category description guide for the 13th Latin Grammy Awards, the award is for vocal or instrumental Samba/Pagode albums containing at least 51% playing time of newly recorded material. For performances by solo artists, duos or groups.

Zeca Pagodinho was the first recipient of the award for Zeca Pagodinho ao Vivo, he also shares the record of most wins in the category with Martinho da Vila, with four wins each. Pagodinho received the award three consecutive times from 2000 to 2002.

In addition, Pagodinho is the most nominated artist in the category with twelve nominations Other multiple winners are Martinho Da Vila with four, Maria Rita with three wins, and Mart'nália with two.

== Recipients ==
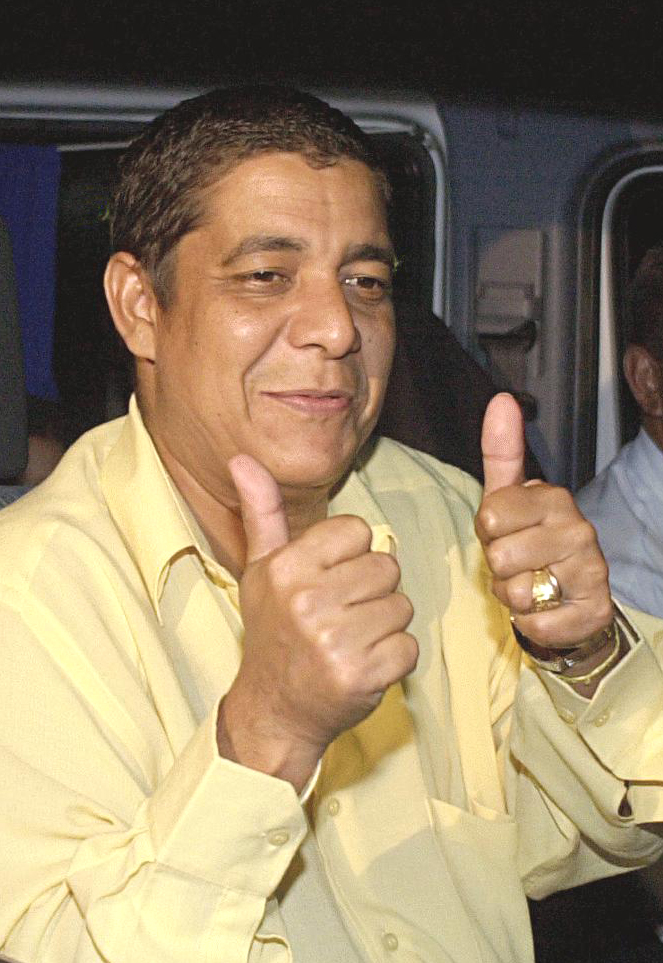
Zeca Pagodinho was the first winner of this award in 2000 for Zeca Pagodinho ao Vivo, since then he has won three more times, in 2001, 2002 and 2007.

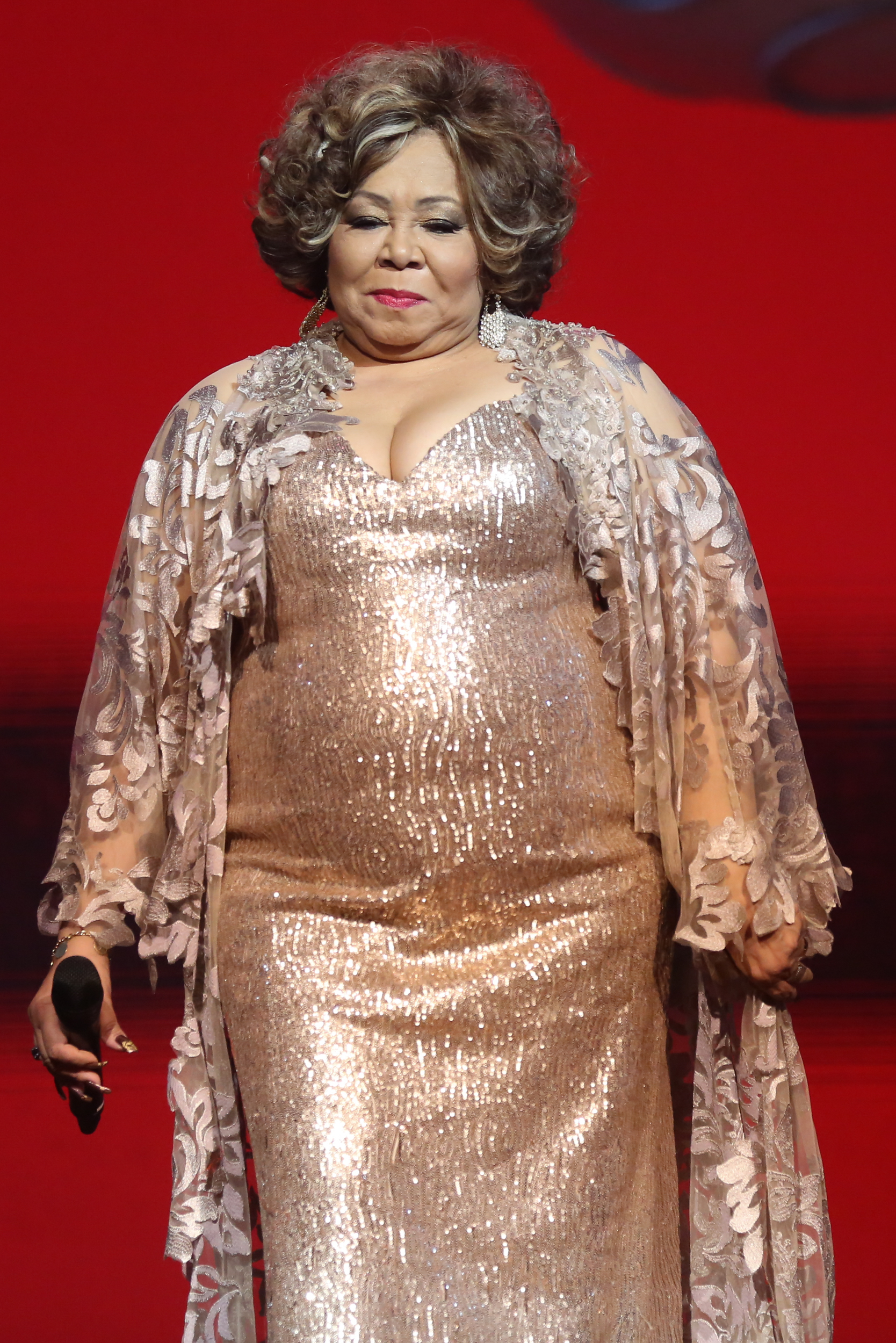
2003-winner Alcione.

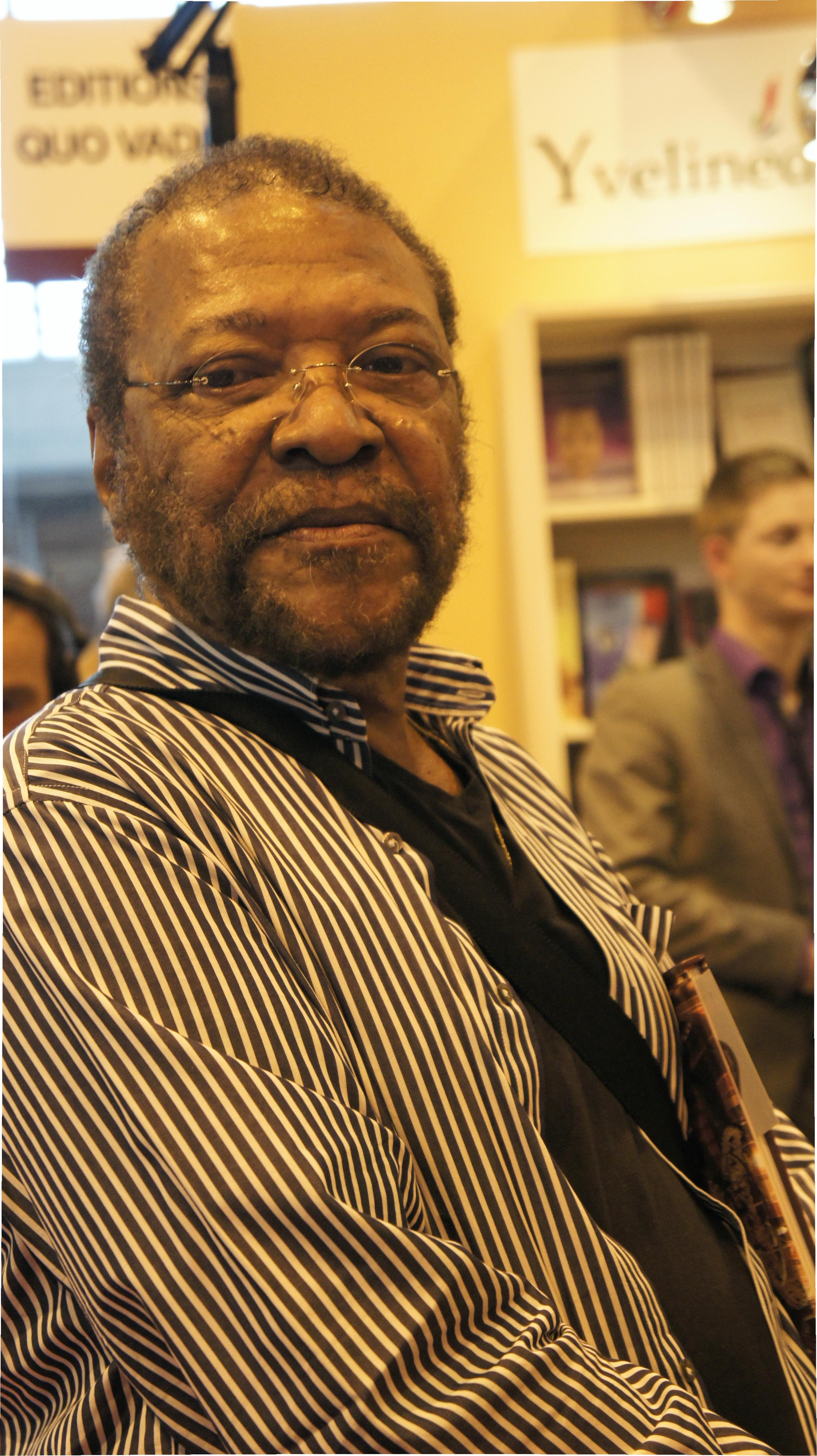
Four-time winner Martinho da Vila.

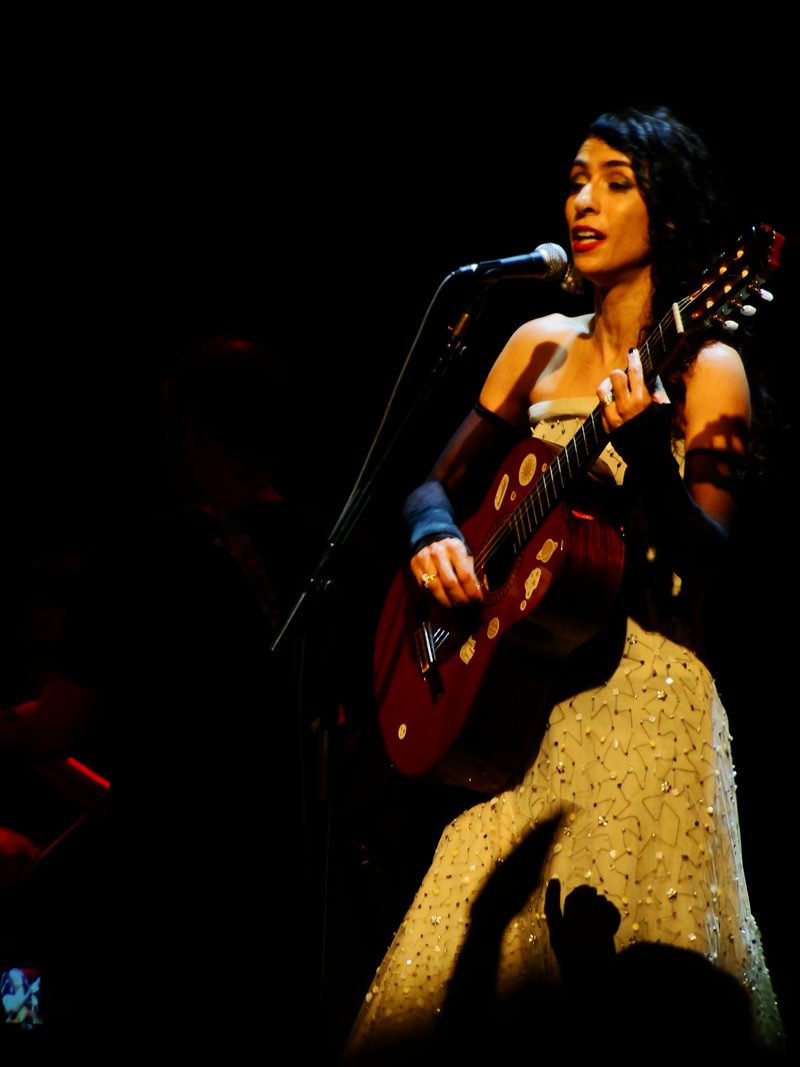
2006 winner Marisa Monte.

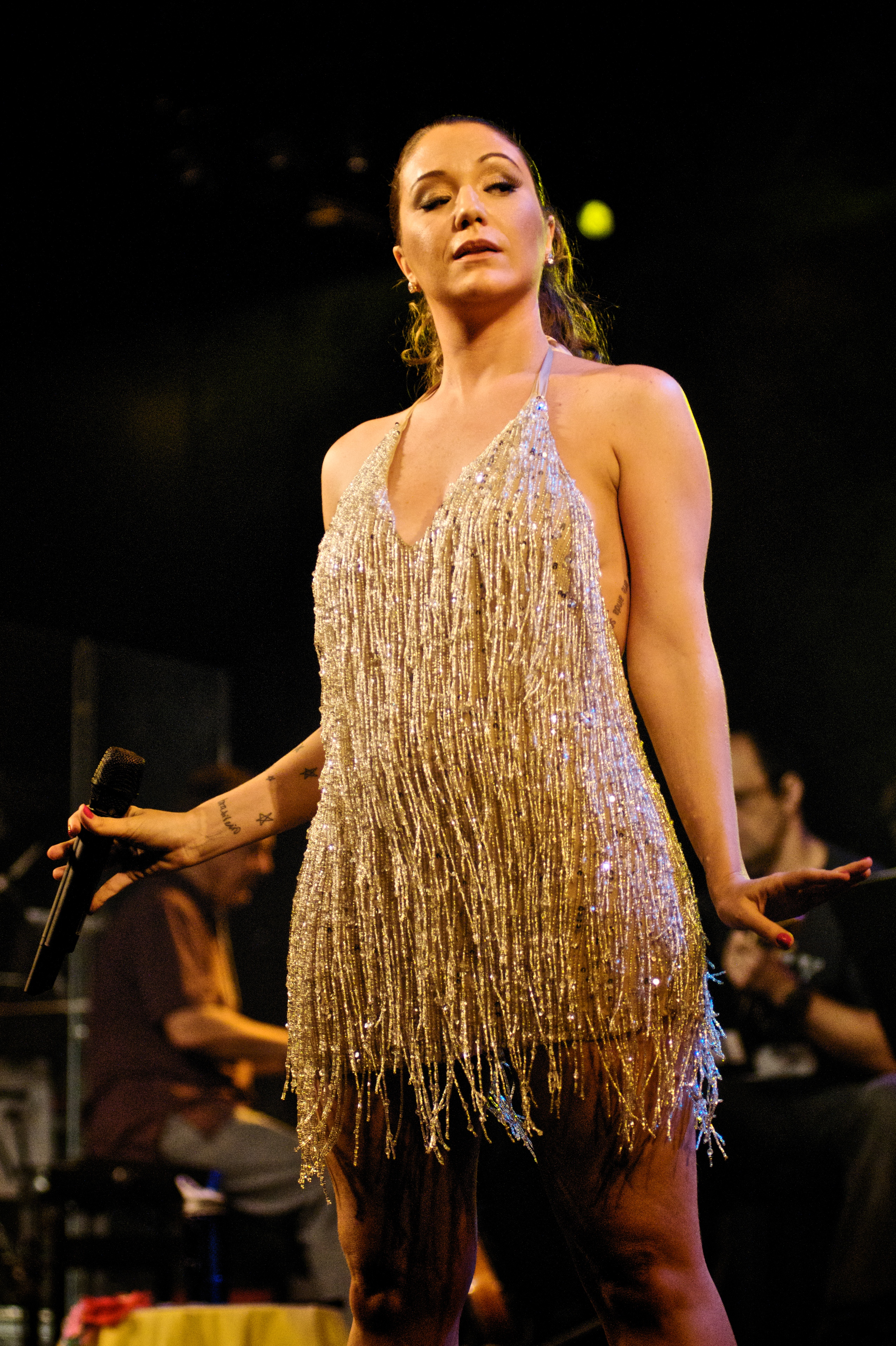
Three-time winner Maria Rita.

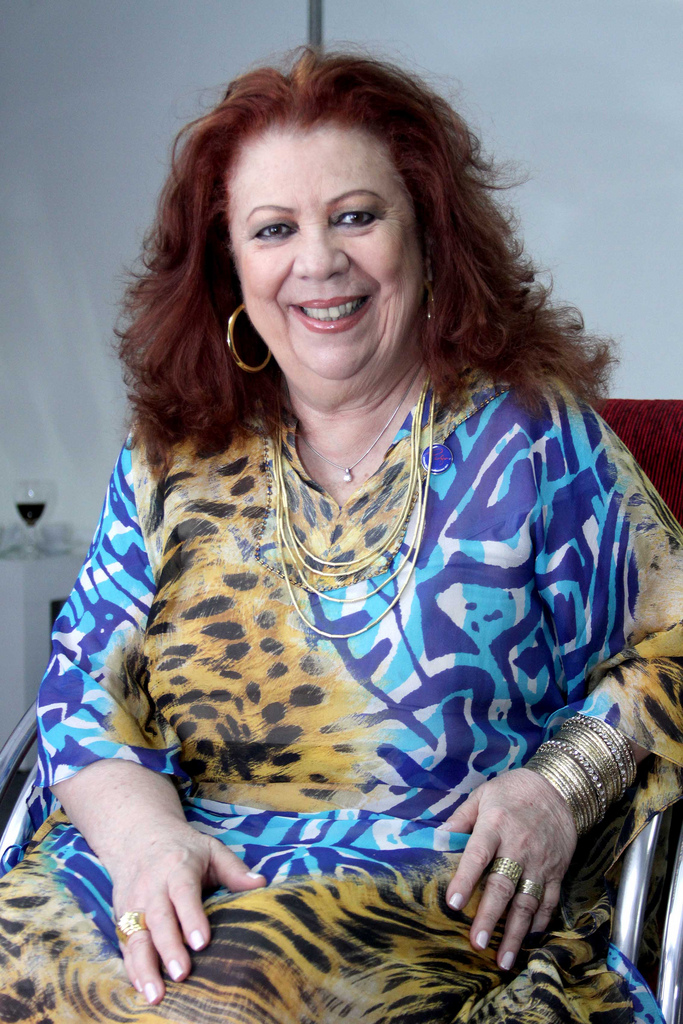
2012-winner Beth Carvalho.

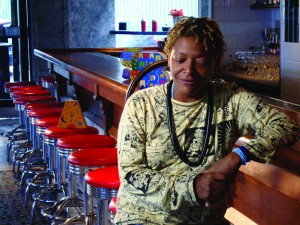
Two-time winner Mart'nália.

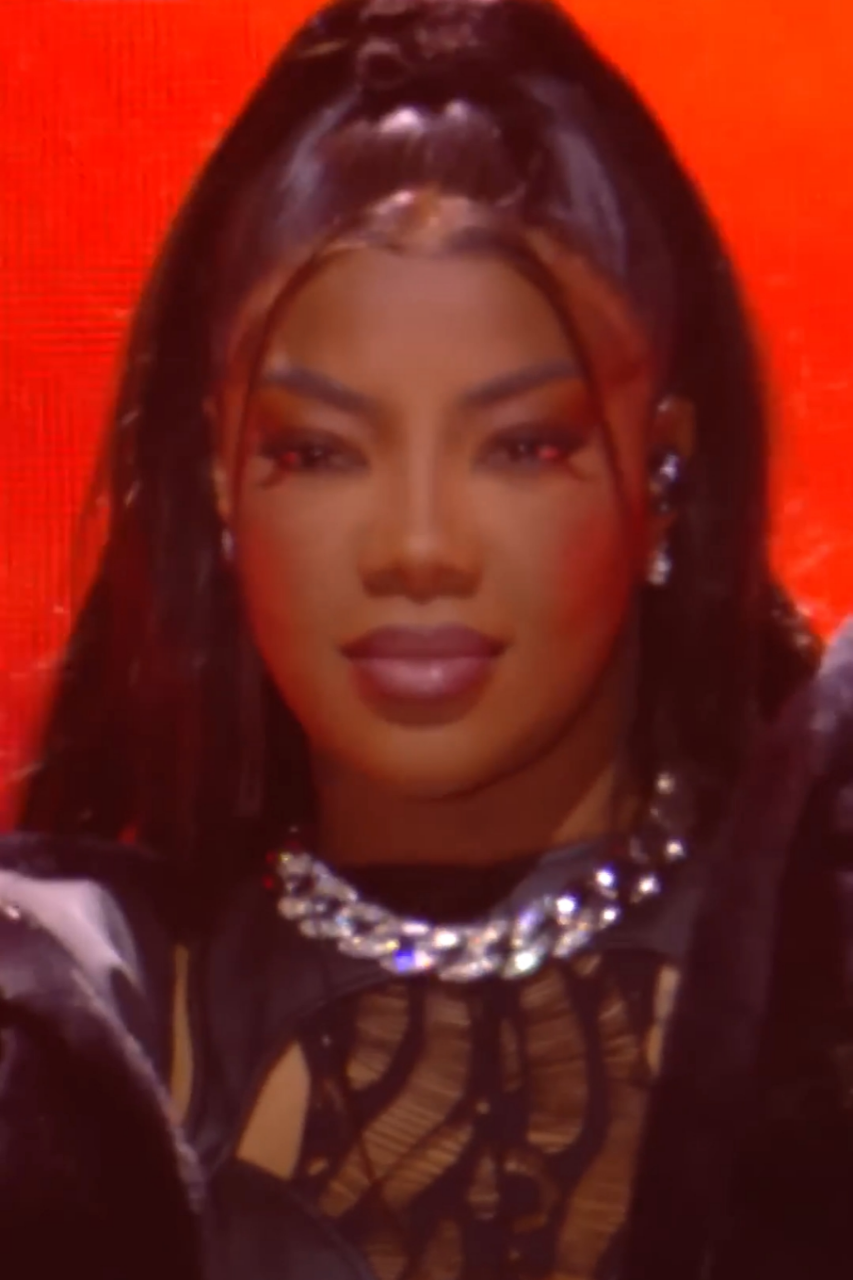
2022 winner Ludmilla.

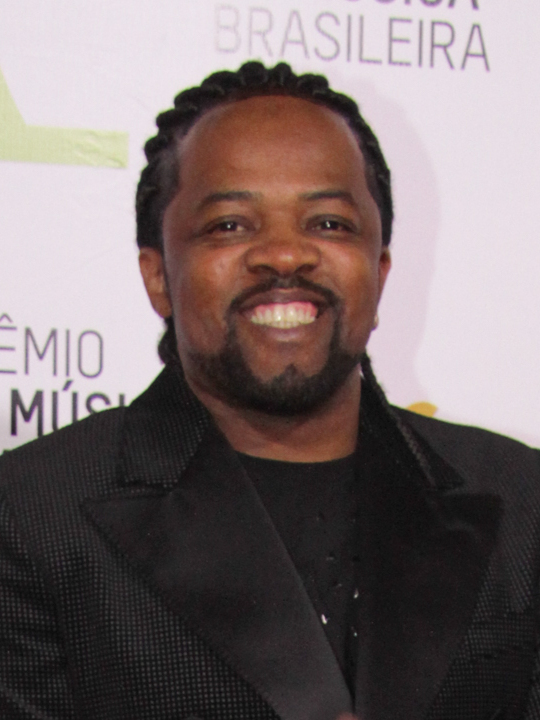
2024 winner Xande de Pilares.

Year	Performing artist(s)	Work	Nominees	Ref.
2000	Zeca Pagodinho	Zeca Pagodinho ao Vivo	Alcione – Claridade; Martinho da Vila – Lusofonia; Velha Guarda da Portela – Tudo Azul; Velha Guarda da Mangueira – Velha Guarda Da Mangueira e convidados	
2001	Zeca Pagodinho	Agua Da Minha Sede	Beth Carvalho – Pagode De Mesa 2 - Ao Vivo; Harmonia do Samba – O Rodo; Jair Rodrigues – 500 Anos De Folia - Volume 2; Various Artists; Rildo Hora (producer) – Casa de Samba 4	
2002	Zeca Pagodinho	Deixa A Vida Me Levar	Martinho da Vila – Da Roca e Da Cidade; Claudio Jorge – Coisa De Chefe; Riachão – Humanenochum; Nelson Sargento – Flores Em Vida	
2003	Alcione	Ao Vivo	Leandro Braga – Primeira Dama - A Música De Dona Ivone Lara; Teresa Cristina & Grupo Semente – A Música De Paulinho Da Viola; Martinho da Vila – Voz e Coração; Jair Rodrigues – Intérprete	
2004	Nana, Dori & Danilo	Para Caymmi. de Nana, Dori e Danilo	Jorge Aragão – Da Noite Pro Dia; Monarco – Uma Historia do Samba; Zeca Pagodinho – Acústico MTV; Velha Guarda do Salgueiro – Velha Guarda do Salgueiro	
2005	Martinho da Vila	Brasilatinidade	Jorge Aragão – Ao Vivo 3; Beth Carvalho – A Madrinha Do Samba / Ao Vivo Convida; Wilson das Neves – Brasão de Orfeu; Nei Lopes – Partido Ao Cubo; Zeca Pagodinho – À Vera	
2006	Marisa Monte	Universo Ao Meu Redor	Alcione – Uma Nova Paixão Ao Vivo; Martinho da Vila – Brasilatinidade Ao Vivo; Demônios da Garoa – Ao Vivo; Jair Rodrigues – Alma Negra	
2007	Zeca Pagodinho	Acústico MTV 2 Gafieira	Jorge Aragão – E Aí?; Beth Carvalho – 40 Anos de Carreira: Ao Vivo No Teatro Municipal Vol. 2; Martinho da Vila – Do Brasil e do Mundo; Mart'nália – Mart'nália Em Berlim Ao Vivo	
2008	Paulinho da Viola	Acústico MTV	Beth Carvalho – Canta O Samba Da Bahia Ao Vivo; Arlindo Cruz – Sambista Perfeito; Luiz Melodia – Estação Melodia	
2008	Maria Rita	Samba Meu	Beth Carvalho – Canta O Samba Da Bahia Ao Vivo; Arlindo Cruz – Sambista Perfeito; Luiz Melodia – Estação Melodia	
2009	Martinho da Vila	O Pequeno Burguês!!	Arlindo Cruz – MTV Ao Vivo; Exaltasamba – Ao Vivo Na Ilha Da Magia; Harmonia Do Samba – Romântico Ao Vivo; Inimigos Da Hp – Ao Vivo Em Zoodstock; Zeca Pagodinho – Uma Prova De Amor	
2010	Diogo Nogueira	Tô Fazendo a Minha Parte	Alcione – Acesa; Martinho da Vila – Poeta da Cidade: Martinho Canta Noel; Grupo Revelação – Ao Vivo no Morro; Monobloco – Monobloco 10; Zeca Pagodinho – MTV Especial Zeca Pagodinho Uma Prova de Amor ao Vivo	
2011	Exaltasamba	Exaltasamba 25 Anos - Ao Vivo	Martinho da Vila – Filosofia de Vida; Fundo de Quintal – Nossa Verdade; Diogo Nogueira – Sou Eu - Ao Vivo; Zeca Pagodinho – Vida da Minha Vida	
2012	Beth Carvalho	Nosso Samba Tá Na Rua	Alcione – Duas Faces Ao Vivo Na Mangueira; Sorriso Maroto – 15 Anos Ao Vivo; Thiaguinho – Ousadia & Alegria	
2012	Emílio Santiago	So Danço Samba Ao Vivo	Alcione – Duas Faces Ao Vivo Na Mangueira; Sorriso Maroto – 15 Anos Ao Vivo; Thiaguinho – Ousadia & Alegria	
2013	Alexandre Pires	Eletrosamba - Ao Vivo	Diogo Nogueira – Ao Vivo Em Cuba; Zeca Pagodinho – Vida Que Segue; Various Artists; Alfonso Carvalho (producer) – Sambabook Martinho da Vila 2; Dora Vergueiro – Dora Vergueiro	
2014	Maria Rita	Coração A Batucar	Alcione – Eterna Alegria Ao Vivo; Martinho da Vila – Enredo; Paula Lima – O Samba É Do Bem; Diogo Nogueira – Mais Amor	
2015	Fundo de Quintal	Só Felicidade	Nilze Carvalho – Verde Amarelo Negro Anil; Arlindo Cruz – Herança Popular; Mart'nália – Em Samba! Ao Vivo; Diogo Nogueira & Hamilton de Holanda – Bossa Negra; Zeca Pagodinho – Ser Humano; Sorriso Maroto – Sorriso Eu Gosto - Ao Vivo No Maracanãzinho	
2016	Martinho da Vila	De Bem Com a Vida	Eduardo Gudin – Notícias Dum Brasil 4; Corina Magalhães – Tem Mineira no Samba; Rogê e Arlindo Cruz – Na Veia; Various Artists; Rildo Hora (producer) – Sambas Para Mangueira	
2017	Mart'nália	+ Misturado	Luciana Mello – Na luz do samba; Diogo Nogueira – Alma brasileira; Roberta Sá – Delírio no Circo; Various Artists; Afonso Carvalho (album producer) – Samba Book: Jorge Aragão	
2018	Maria Rita	Amor E Música	Martinho da Vila – Alô Vila Isabeeeel!!!; Ferrugem – Prazer, Eu Sou Ferrugem; Diogo Nogueira – Munduê; Thiaguinho – Só Vem! Ao Vivo	
2019	Mart'nália	Mart'nália Canta Vinicius de Moraes	Nego Álvaro – Canta Sereno E Moa; Monarco – De Todos Os Tempos; Péricles – Em Sua Direção; Anaí Rosa – Anaí Rosa Atraca Geraldo Pereira	
2020	Cláudio Jorge	Samba Jazz de Raiz, Cláudio Jorge 70	Maria Bethânia – Mangueira - A Menina dos Meus Olhos; Martinho da Vila – Martinho 8.0 - Bandeira da Fé: Um Concerto Pop-Clássico (Ao vivo); Moacyr Luz e Samba do Trabalhador – Fazendo Samba; Zeca Pagodinho – Mais Feliz	
2021	Paulinho da Viola	Sempre Se Pode Sonhar	Martinho da Vila – Rio: Só Vendo a Vista; Nei Lopes, Projeto Coisa Fina & Guga Stroeter – Nei Lopes, Projeto Coisa Fina e Guga Stroeter No Pagode Black Tie; Diogo Nogueira – Samba de Verão; Varios Artistas; Lucas Mayer (producer) – Onze (Músicas Inéditas de Adoniran Barbosa)	
2022	Ludmilla	Numanice 2	Nego Alvaro – Bons Ventos; Martinho Da Vila – Mistura Homogênea; Alfredo Del-Penho, João Cavalcanti, Moyseis Marques e Pedro Miranda – Desengaiola; Péricles – Céu Lilás	
2023	Martinho Da Vila	Negra Ópera	Mumuzinho – Resenha Do Mumu; Maria Rita – Desse Jeito; Roberta Sá – Sambasá; Thiaguinho – Meu Nome É Thiago André (Ao Vivo)	
2024	Xande de Pilares	Xande Canta Caetano	Alcione – Alcione 50 Anos (Ao Vivo); Marcelo D2 – Iboru; Thiaguinho – Tardezinha Pela Vida Inteira (Ao Vivo); Tiee – Subúrbio (Ao Vivo)	
2025	Sorriso Maroto	Sorriso Eu Gosto No Pagode Vol. 3 - Homenagem Ao Fundo De Quintal (Gravado Em Londres)	Alcione – Alcione; Marcelo D2 – Manual Prático Do Novo Samba Tradicional, Vol. 2: Tia Darci; Mart'nália – Pagode Da Mart'nália; Zeca Pagodinho – Zeca Pagodinho - 40 Anos (Ao Vivo)	
