= Mart'nália =

Brazilian singer, songwriter, percussionist and actress

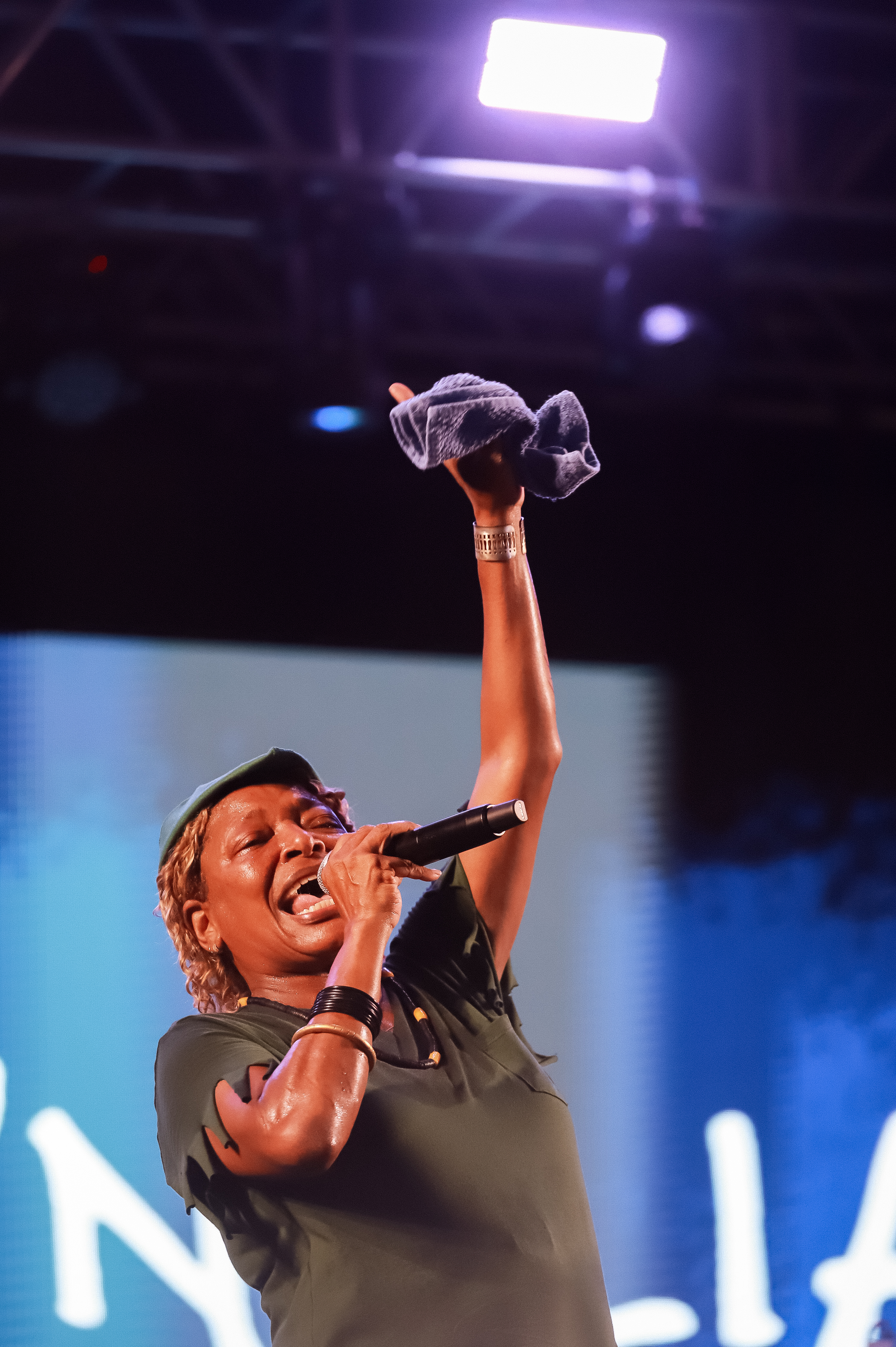
- Mart'nália (2024)

Background information
- Born: Martnália Mendonça Ferreira; September 7, 1965 (age 60); Rio de Janeiro, Brazil
- Formerly of: Batacotô
- Website: martnalia.com.br

Martnália Mendonça Ferreira, known as Mart'nália (Rio de Janeiro, September 7, 1965) is a Brazilian singer, songwriter, percussionist and actress.

== Career ==
Daughter of sambista Martinho da Vila and singer Analia Mendonca (her name is a blend of parents' names), the singer was born in Vila Isabel, North Zone of Rio de Janeiro. Since childhood she was surrounded by music.

She began her professional career at age 16, doing backing vocals for her father beside her sister, Analimar. In the mid 1990s, she began making presentations on the circuit of bars, nightclubs and theaters in Rio de Janeiro, which culminated in the release of her samba album Minha cara. Since 1994, she joined the group Batacotô, whose percussionist was Ivan Lins.

Mart'nália had the privilege of becoming sponsored by big names of Brazilian popular music thanks to her father. Caetano Veloso was the artistic director of her Pé de meu samba and composed the title track, and Maria Bethânia produced Menino do Rio From these two albums, Mart'nália began to attract greater media attention and to have shows throughout the country, paving the way for international tours through Europe and Africa.

In 2015, her album Em Samba! Ao vivo was nominated for the 16th Latin Grammy Awards in the Best Samba/Pagode Album category. In 2017, another album of hers, Misturado, was nominated in the same category of the 2017 edition, and this time it won. In 2019, she was nominated for a third time in that category, this time for the album Mart'nalia Canta Vinicius de Moraes.

== Personal life ==
Mart'nália is a lesbian.

== Discography ==
Year	Title	Label	Format
1987	Martinália	Grav. 3M	LP
1997	Minha Cara	ZFM Records	CD
2002	Pé do meu Samba	Grav. BMG Brasil/Natasha Records	CD
2004	Pé do meu Samba (Ao Vivo)	Natasha Records	CD/DVD
2006	Menino do Rio	Grav. Biscoito Fino (Selo Quitanda)	CD
2006	Mart'nália - Ao Vivo em Berlim	Grav. Biscoito Fino (Selo Quitanda)	CD/DVD
2008	Madrugada	Grav. Biscoito Fino (Selo Quitanda)	CD
2009	Minha Cara (Disco de 1997 relançado pela ZFM Records)	ZFM Records (Selo Quitanda)	CD
2010	Mart'nália - Em África ao Vivo	Grav. Biscoito Fino	CD/DVD
2012	Não Tente Compreender	Grav. Biscoito Fino	CD
2014	Em Samba Ao Vivo	Grav. Biscoito Fino	CD/DVD
2016	+ Misturado	Grav. Biscoito Fino	CD
2019	Mart'nália Canta Vinicius de Moraes	Grav. Biscoito Fino	CD
2021	Sou Assim Até Mudar	Grav. Biscoito Fino	CD

== Media ==
- Samba on your Feet, 2005
