= João Nogueira =

Brazilian composer and singer

- Born: November 12, 1941; Rio de Janeiro, Brazil
- Died: June 5, 2000 (aged 58); Rio de Janeiro, Brazil
- Occupations: Singer, composer
- Years active: 1968–2000

João Nogueira (November 12, 1941 – June 5, 2000) was a Brazilian singer and composer, famous for his samba compositions. He was born in Rio de Janeiro.

His first composition, "Espera ó Nega" was recorded in 1968, however it was in 1970 that he gained fame when Elizeth Cardoso recorded his song "Corrente de Aço". His music has been recorded by some of Brazil's most well known singers such as Elis Regina, Clara Nunes, Emílio Santiago, Beth Carvalho and Alcione. He is also the father of singer and composer Diogo Nogueira.

== Biography ==
=== Early life and career ===
The son of lawyer and musician João Batista Nogueira and the brother of composer Gisa Nogueira, João came into contact with the musical world early. He soon learned to play the guitar and compose in partnership with his sister.

João Nogueira began composing at fifteen, creating sambas for the Labareda carnival block in Méier. Through this, he met musician Moacyr Silva, director of the Copacabana record label, who helped him record the samba "Espera ó Nega" in 1968. He gained national attention in the early 1970s with the success of "Das 200 Para Lá", a samba advocating the policy of expanding Brazil's maritime border along the 200-mile continental shelf. The samba topped the charts in the voice of Eliana Pittman and was cited in a report by the American magazine Time for its affirmative nationalist tone. As an employee of Caixa Econômica, João faced some scrutiny since the 200-mile flag had been raised by the military government. "They thought I had turned into Dom and Ravel," he later joked. His first record was a simple compact with "Alô Madureira" and "Mulher Valente". In 1969, Elizeth Cardoso recorded his "Corrente de Aço" on the album Falou, propelling him to nationwide fame.

=== Career ===
In his 1974 LP, João dedicated a track to Noel Rosa by recording "Gago Apaixonado". Later, he recorded "Não Tem Tradução", once again revering the Vila poet, one of the three pillars of his inspiration, alongside Geraldo Pereira and Wilson Batista, whose influences explained his style of composing and singing samba. He dedicated an entire LP to these three (Wilson, Geraldo, and Noel, 1981, Polygram). However, this album is remembered for other hits like "Nó na Madeira" (in partnership with Eugênio Monteiro) and "Mineira", a tribute to Clara Nunes in partnership with P. C. Pinheiro, Clara's husband. The album also included three collaborations with a talented young guitarist, Cláudio Jorge, with whom he wrote three tracks ("Samba da Bandola", "Chorando Pelos Dedos", and "Para fugir Nunca Mais"). Ivor Lancelotti, whose samba-canção "De Rosas e Coisas Amigas" João had recorded in 1974, reappeared with "Seu Caminho Se Abre". In 1979, he introduced his partner in the show João Nogueira Apresenta Ivor Lancelotti.

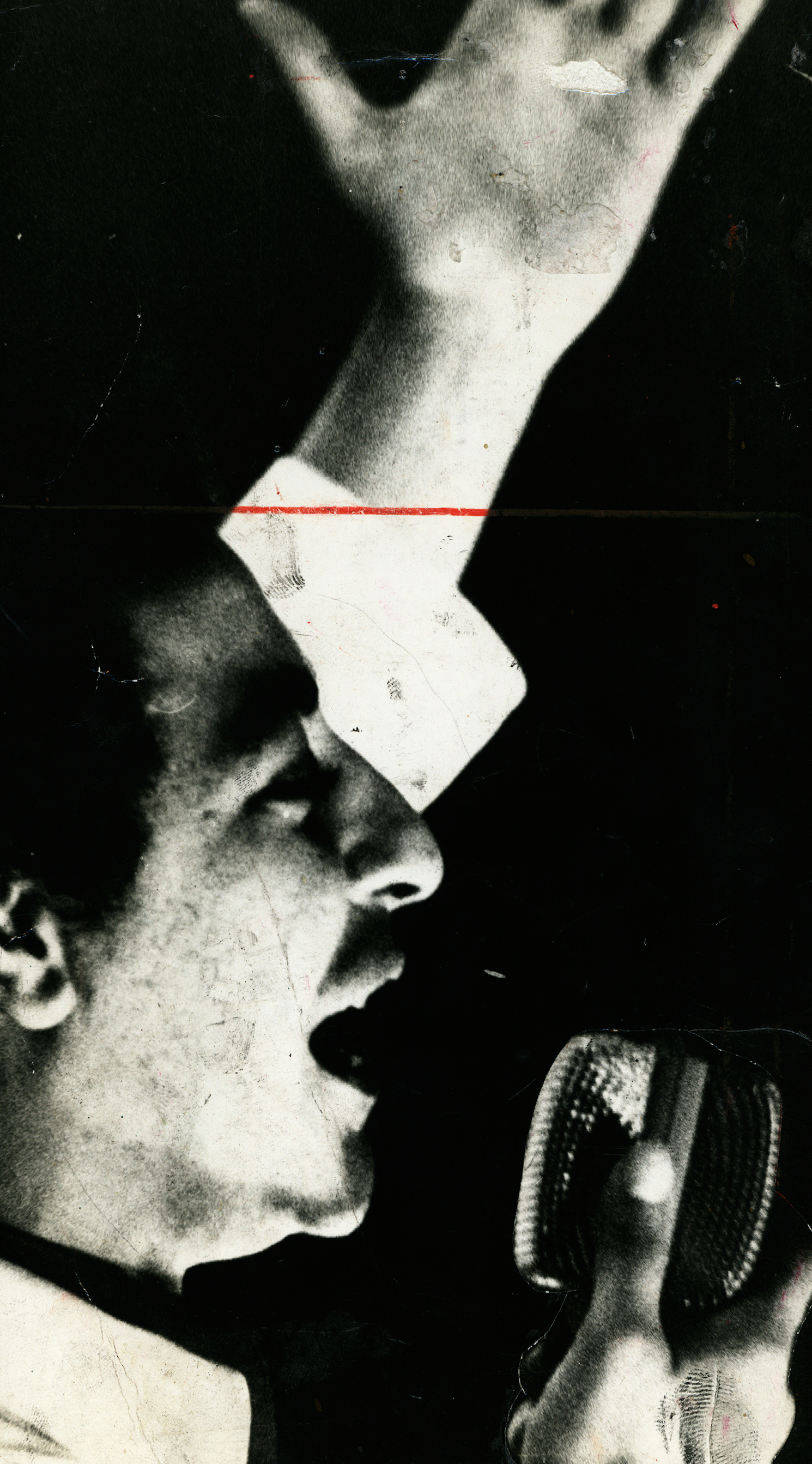
Nogueira in 1972.

When Diogo Nogueira, his son, sings "Espelho", the title track of the album João released in 1977, he is referring to his father in the lines, "One day I kicked badly and hurt my toe / And without having the old man to scare away the fear / It was another desire that was left behind." In fact, the song's lyrics are autobiographical of João, the father, referring to Diogo's grandfather. Flamengo supporter João Nogueira was also a frustrated footballer due to an injury.

The first four albums João released set the main lines of what would be his career. They contain the best of the composer, who once entered Portelão singing, "Today I am full of joy / And I am even capable of getting drunk / Some samba friends this day / Invited me to participate / From a samba school that is all my darling / From a yard of sambas that is all my trouble / I will get rid of sadness / And samba in the beauty of its Carnival," a samba introducing him to the composers' wing of Águia de Osvaldo Cruz, who invited him to join their sambas in 1972. The relationship lasted until the mid-80s when João left the school, unhappy with the direction imposed by president Carlinhos Maracanã. He joined other sambistas, heirs of the old Natal, to found, in 1984, Tradição, a school for which he composed the first five sambas-enredo in partnership with P. C. Pinheiro, from 1985 to 1989. Diogo, his son, reconciled with Portela, where he won the samba-enredo competition four times.

In 1979, João founded the Clube do Samba with Alcione, Martinho da Vila, and Beth Carvalho, an entity to which he dedicated the title of his album that year, bringing new hits like "Súplica" and "Canto do Trabalhador" (with P. C. Pinheiro). The club initially operated in his house and later launched a carnival block to parade on Avenida Rio Branco, attracting revelers nostalgic for old carnivals. It operated at various addresses, including Barra da Tijuca. The stage hosted great names of samba and composers from carioca schools. Frequently, the program would bring together people like Ivone Lara, João Nogueira, and Roberto Ribeiro, who was honored by the block in Carnival one year after his death. João himself, who died in 2000, was honored in the following Carnival with the theme "Como Diria João."

One of João's most sung songs, a kind of anthem for composers, was the success of the 1980 album Boca do Povo. It is "Poder da Criação" ("No one makes samba just because they prefer / No force in the world interferes / With the power of creation"), again with P. C. Pinheiro, his most frequent partner, with whom he released the CD Parceria in 1994, celebrating 22 years of joint compositions and more than fifty works. "We sit together and when we get up, a samba is coming out. Even unintentionally," João would say. Among the seventeen tracks of the CD, there is a tribute to Clara Nunes, who died in 1983, in the songs "Um Ser de Luz" and "As Forças da Natureza", with emotional lines like "The plagues and the weeds / The weapons and the evil men / Will disappear / In the ashes of a Carnival." João would release other great albums, like the aforementioned tribute to the three samba greats, Wilson, Geraldo, Noel, his ninth album (1981), only with songs by the three authors, giving a break to his partnership with P. C. Pinheiro.

=== Later career ===
He continued to release quality albums (eighteen solo albums in total) and participated in collective albums, such as Clara Nunes - Com Vida (1995), in which he shared tracks with artists like Martinho da Vila, Roberto Ribeiro, and Nana Caymmi. And Chico Buarque da Mangueira (1998), an album in tribute to the composer who was the theme of the school that year. In 1995, with maestro and pianist Marinho Boffa, João recorded a CD with only songs by Chico Buarque de Hollanda, in a project by Almir Chediak with fourteen songs, part of the second edition of the Letra e Música project. The album was launched with a show on the program Seis e Meia at the João Caetano Theater. He also participated in the album Esquina do Samba, recorded live in 2000 at the Pirajá bar in São Paulo, with Ivone Lara, Walter Alfaiate, Beth Carvalho, Moacyr Luz, Luiz Carlos da Vila, and others. That same year, he participated in an album by Velha Guarda da Portela. In 2009, a DVD of João Nogueira's participation in the program Ensaio, by TV Cultura de São Paulo, was released.

=== Death ===
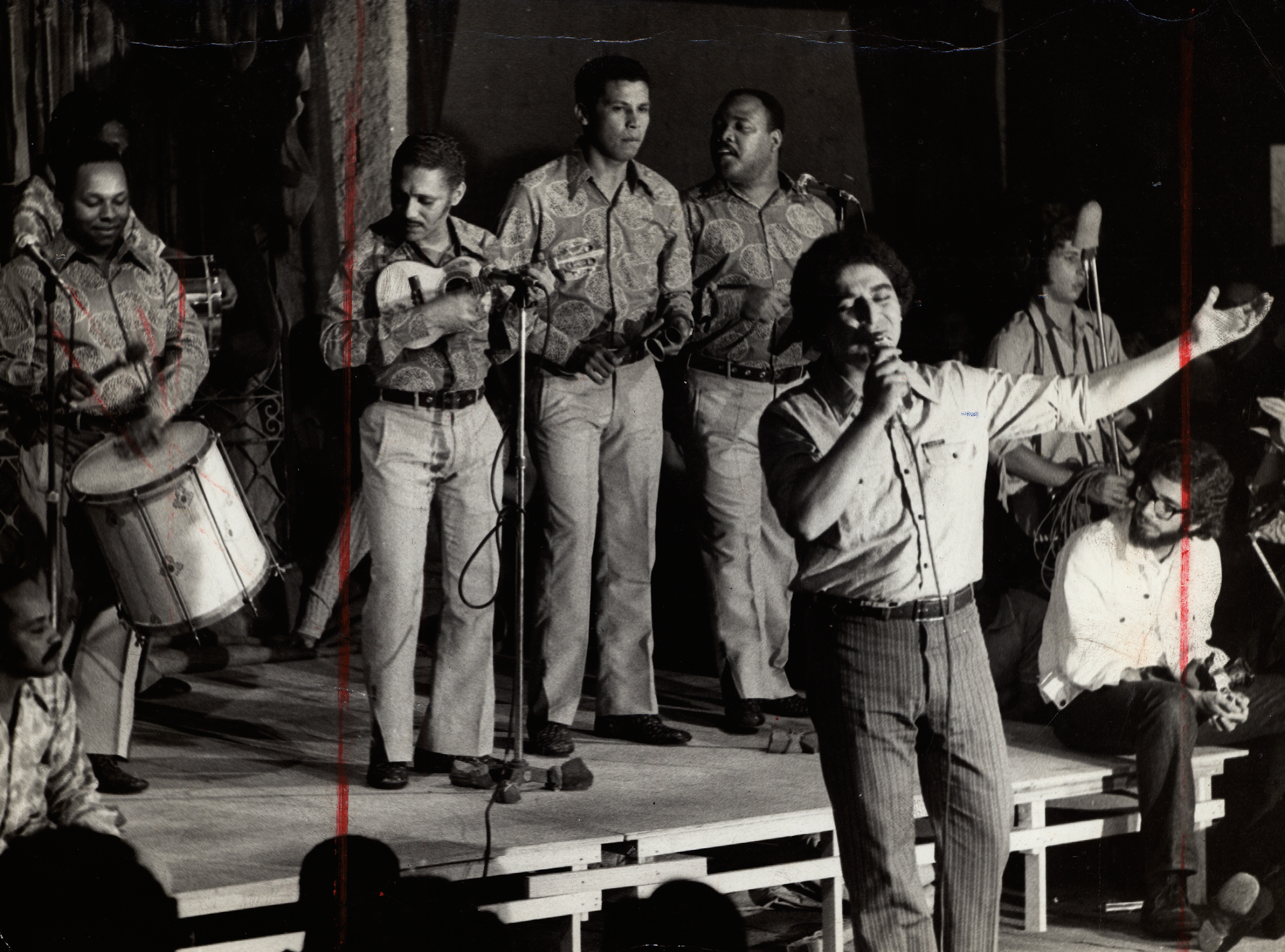
Nogueira at the Portela Festival.

João Nogueira died in the early hours of June 5, 2000, at the age of 58, from a massive heart attack at his home in Recreio dos Bandeirantes. He had been suffering from circulatory problems that caused a cerebral ischemia two years earlier. He was hospitalized in critical condition for a long time but managed to recover. He suffered another, less impactful ischemia at the beginning of 2000 and another two months later. But under medical observation, he was confident, led a more regulated life, and rehearsed for shows he was planning to perform, in which he intended to present new works in addition to hits from his last album, João de Todos os Sambas, released in 1998 at the Acadêmicos da Rocinha Samba School court, in the favela honored in the album: "By the sea / On a hill that was still unpopulated / And divided Gávea and São Conrado / A favela was born," he sang in the track "Rocinha". His death was a significant loss for the Brazilian musical scene. "He had a very unique way of phrasing. I don't see followers of his. I believe this school, whose origin might have been Ciro Monteiro, ends with João's death," lamented Hermínio Bello de Carvalho. Everyone knew of his special qualities as an interpreter, but João valued his compositions the least. Only in 1999, when he received the Eletrobrás MPB Trophy, did he recognize his singing. "Today I love singing. Before, I liked to be seen more as a composer," he said. João left behind four children, including Diogo, who took up the baton, did not let the peteca fall, and makes us miss his father, given the physical and vocal resemblance and the charm with which he represents the best carioca samba.

After his death, several colleagues gathered to present a tribute show on the same dates and at the same location. Participants included Zeca Pagodinho, Beth Carvalho, Dona Ivone Lara, Arlindo Cruz and Sombrinha, Emílio Santiago, Carlinhos Vergueiro, and João's family: nephew Didu, son Diogo, and sister and partner Gisa. The show was recorded for the album João Nogueira, Através do Espelho.

== Discography ==
- 1972 João Nogueira
- 1974 E Lá Vou Eu
- 1975 Vem Quem Tem
- 1977 Espelho
- 1978 Vida Boêmia
- 1979 Clube Do Samba
- 1980 Boca Do Povo
- 1981 Homem aos 40
- 1981 Wilson, Geraldo & Noel
- 1983 Bem Transado
- 1984 Pelas Terras Do Pau-Brasil
- 1985 De Amor É Bom
- 1986 Boteco Do Arlindo
- 1988 João
- 1992 Programa Ensaio
- 1994 Parceria
- 1996 Letra & Música
- 1998 De Todos Os Sambas
- 2000 Através Do Espelho
