= Mart'nália Canta Vinicius de Moraes =

Studio album by Mart'nália
- Released: March 15, 2019
- Studio: Biscoito Fino, Botafogo, Rio de Janeiro, Brazil; La Seine Records Studios, Paris, France
- Genre: Bossa nova Samba
- Length: 44:54
- Language: Portuguese
- Label: Biscoito Fino
- Producer: Arthur Maia; Celso Fonseca

Mart'nália chronology
+ Misturado (2016)	Mart'nália Canta Vinicius de Moraes (2019)	Sou Assim Até Mudar (2021)

Singles from Mart'nália Canta Vinicius de Moraes
- 1. "A Tonga da Mironga do Kabuletê" Released: December 14, 2018

Mart'nália Canta Vinicius de Moraes is a studio album by Brazilian singer Mart'nália released on March 15, 2019 by Biscoito Fino, in which the singer performs compositions and songs recorded by Brazilian singer and diplomat Vinicius de Moraes.

== Background ==
The twelfth album by Brazilian singer Mart'nália is a tribute by the singer to composer Vinicius de Moraes, who was a friend of her father, Martinho da Vila, and visited her home regularly when she was a child to see her father. Produced by musicians Arthur Maia and Celso Fonseca, the album was released by the Biscoito Fino record label. The album was recorded at the record label's studio, located in the Botafogo neighborhood of Rio de Janeiro. The only song that was not recorded in the studio in Rio de Janeiro was Insensatez, recorded at La Seine Records Studios in Paris, France, due to the participation of French singer Carla Bruni.

The album explored compositions by Vinicius with various partners he had during his career, with compositions made with musicians such as Baden Powell, Toquinho, Antônio Carlos Jobim, and Carlos Lyra. In addition to Bruni's participation, the album featured contributions from Maria Bethânia and Toquinho.

The album also marks the last work of bassist Arthur Maia, who died in December 2018, months before the album's release.

In an interview with Leonardo Lichote for the newspaper O Globo, the singer declared herself a fan of joy and of how Vinicius viewed love. She mentioned other singers, such as Elizeth Cardoso and Nana Caymmi, but stated, "I like Vinicius' lightness in love, even sadness is light, there's no ‘I'm going to kill myself’. But at the same time, he is intense in the way he receives and gives love. And like Vinicius, I adore the beauty of women, of love. The difference is that I'm a beer drinker and he was a whiskey drinker."

== Track listing ==
No.	Title	Writer(s)	Featured artist	Length
1.	"Saudação A Vinicius de Moraes / Samba Da Benção"	Baden Powell, Vinicius de Moraes		0:50
2.	"A Tonga Da Mironga Do Kabuletê"	Toquinho, Vinicius de Moraes		3:14
3.	"Deixa"	Baden Powell, Vinicius de Moraes		2:55
4.	"Um Pouco Mais de Consideração"	Toquinho, Vinicius de Moraes		2:40
5.	"Minha Namorada"	Carlos Lyra, Vinicius de Moraes		3:56
6.	"Eu Sei Que Vou Te Amar / Soneto do Corifeu" (Includes citation: Soneto do Corifeu)	Tom Jobim, Vinicius de Moraes / Vinicius de Moraes	Maria Bethânia	4:56
7.	"Sabe Você?"	Carlos Lyra, Vinicius de Moraes		3:36
8.	"Onde Anda Você"	Vinicius de Moraes, Hermano Silva		3:16
9.	"Você E Eu"	Carlos Lyra, Vinicius de Moraes		2:23
10.	"Insensatez (Quelle Grande Sottise)"	Tom Jobim, Vinicius de Moraes, Mário Lúcio	Carla Bruni	4:23
11.	"Tarde Em Itapoã"	Toquinho, Vinicius de Moraes	Toquinho	4:06
12.	"Maria Vai Com As Outras"	Toquinho, Vinicius de Moraes		3:53
13.	"Canto de Ossanha"	Baden Powell, Vinicius de Moraes		3:48
14.	"Agradecimento A Vinicius de Moraes / Samba Da Benção"	Mart'nália / Baden Powell, Vinicius de Moraes		0:24
Total length:				44:26

== Release ==
The album was released on March 15, 2019, with a CD version and arriving on music streaming platforms.

=== Tour ===
For the album launch, Mart'nália performed a series of concerts in Brazil, including Rio de Janeiro,São Paulo, Belo Horizonte, Salvador, Fortaleza, Florianópolis, and Brasília. The singer also toured Europe, performing in Dublin, London, Amsterdam, Malmo, Zurich, Lugano, Paris, Ponte da Barca and Lisbon.

== Reception ==
=== Critical ===
In his blog on G1, journalist and music critic Mauro Ferreira rated the album three stars out of five. Despite the positive review, when commenting on the work, Ferreira stated, "the work gives the impression that it is one of the least appealing titles in the artist's discography. [...] The fact is that Mart'nália has been making complacent, sometimes even lazy albums—and not because of market pressures, since the singer has been recording and releasing albums since 2005 with the record label Biscoito Fino, which values the artistic freedom of its artists."

Carlos Bozzo Junior wrote for the Folha de S.Paulo newspaper, where he praised the album. According to Junior: “Mart'nália pays tribute to herself and the poet with swing and propriety.” Raul da Gama, writing for the Latin Jazz Network, praised the album and said that "Canta Vinicius de Moraes places Mart'nália in a very select circle among Brazil's musical elite. As a singer, she proves herself to be a first-rate artist, moving away from the samba repertoire for which she is best known."

=== Prizes ===
In 2019, the album Mart'nália Canta Vinicius de Moraes was nominated for a Latin Grammy Award in the Best Samba/Pagode Album category. At a ceremony held on November 14, 2019, at the MGM Grand Garden Arena in Las Vegas, the album was declared the winner in its category.

Year	Prize	Category	Location	Result	Ref.
2019	Latin Grammy Awards	Latin Grammy Award for Best Samba/Pagode Album	MGM Grand Las Vegas, Las Vegas, Nevada, United States	Won	

== Personnel ==
The following musicians worked on the album:

- Mart'nália: Vocals, Backing Vocals, Pandeiro, Afoxé, Triangle, Bucket, Effects
- Carla Bruni: Vocals
- Maria Bethânia: Vocals
- Toquinho: Vocals, Acoustic Guitar
- Arthur Maia: Electric Bass, Acoustic Bass (Baixolão), Piano, Backing Vocals, Shaker, Moringa
- Celso Fonseca: Acoustic Guitar, Electric Guitar, Backing Vocals
- Fernando Caneca: Acoustic Guitar, Electric Guitar
- Paulo Braga: Drums
- Alexandre Cavallo: Electric Bass, Acoustic Bass
- Jorjão Barreto: Piano, Keyboards, Backing Vocals
- Flavinho Santos: Drums
- Macaco Branco: Pandeiro, Tamborim, Congas, Cajon, Snare Drum, Surdo, Tarol, Seeds, Effects, Reco-reco
- André Siqueira: Bongos, Shaker, Reco-reco, Cuíca, Tantan, Caixa, Small Bottle (Garrafinha), Tamborim, Surdo, Berimbau, Effects
- Analimar Ventapane: Backing Vocals
- Marcello Ferreira: Backing Vocals
- Raoni Ventapane: Backing Vocals
- Humberto Mirabelli: Acoustic Guitar, Electric Guitar
- Milton Guedes: Harmonica
- Tito Junior: Flute
- Di Stefanno: Drums
- Whatson Cardozo: Clarinet
- Marcelo Costa: Chapa com Vassourinha (Metal Plate with Small Broom), Xequerê, Block
