= Maria Rita =

Brazilian singer (born 1977)

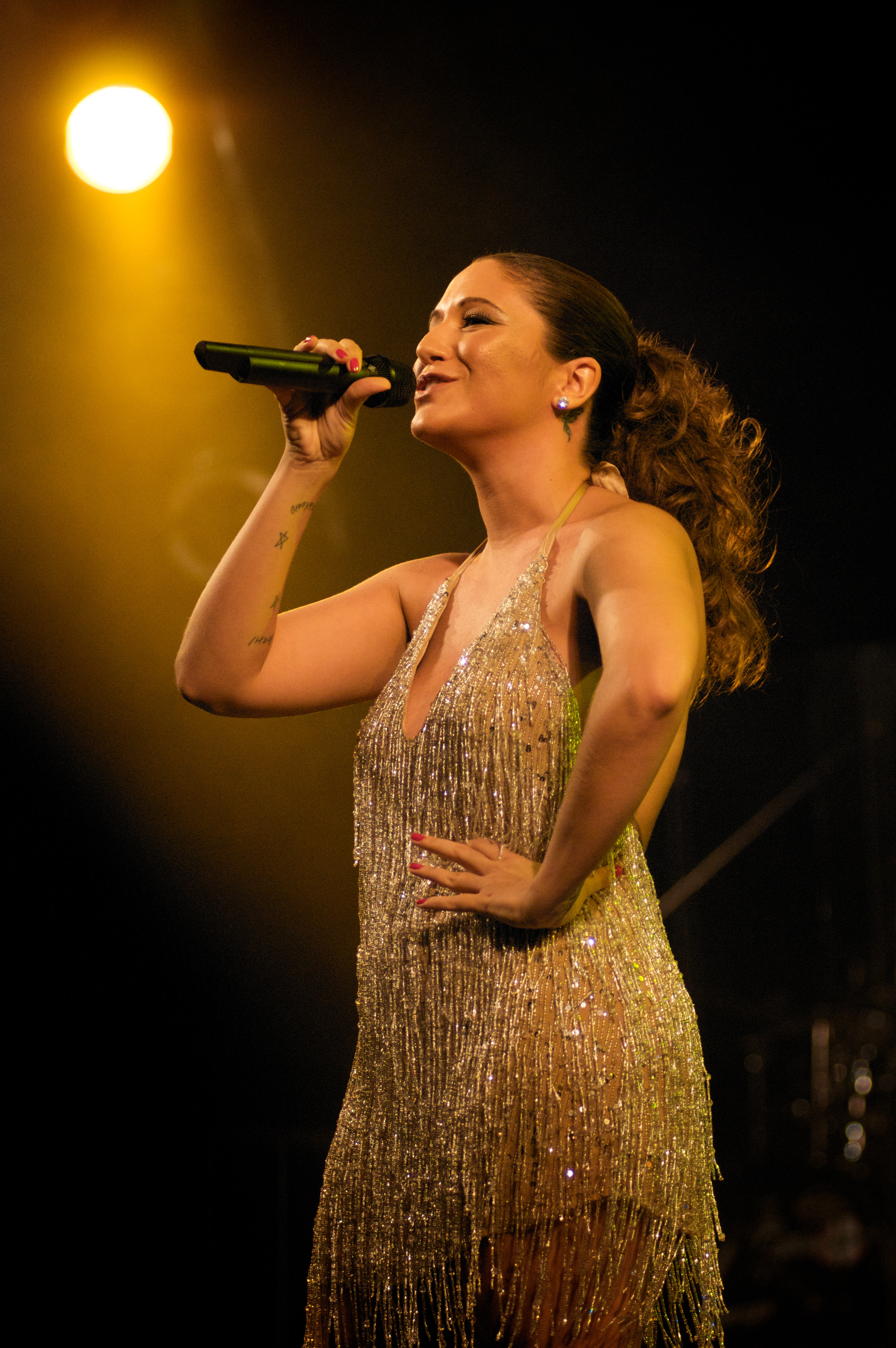
- Maria Rita performing at Virada Cultural in 2009.

Background information
- Born: Maria Rita Camargo Mariano; 9 September 1977 (age 49); São Paulo, Brazil
- Genres: MPB, jazz, samba
- Instrument: Voice
- Years active: 2001–present
- Labels: Warner Latina; Wea International; Universal Music
- Website: maria-rita.com

Maria Rita (born 9 September 1977) is a Brazilian singer. Born Maria Rita Camargo Mariano, she is the daughter of famed pianist/arranger César Camargo Mariano and the late Brazilian singing legend Elis Regina and sister to Pedro Mariano and music producer João Marcelo Bôscoli. Her namesake is family friend and famed Brazilian rock legend Rita Lee. She studied at New York University, and worked as a journalist at a magazine for adolescents.

== Career ==
Maria Rita began singing professionally at the age of 24, although she had wanted to sing since she was 14. Her first CD, Maria Rita, launched her career symbolically, with the first cut on her first album, A Festa (The Party), being written by Milton Nascimento, the legendary Brazilian singer-songwriter whose career was launched by Maria Rita's mother, Elis Regina, when she began to sing his songs to the national Brazilian audience. The CD went platinum and was a hit worldwide, making her an international star. She developed her own jazzy vocal style, with singers like Ella Fitzgerald as her model. For her 2013 album Redescobrir she was finally persuaded to perform and record songs her mother had sung.

She won the 2004 Latin Grammy Awards for Best New Artist in the General Field, Best Song in Portuguese ("A festa") and her debut album Maria Rita won the Best MPB (Musica Popular Brasileira) Album award for that year. The world hit that "Segundo" turned out to be, granted her in 2006, two additional Grammys Latinos – Best MPB Album and Best Brazilian Song with "Caminho das Águas" authored by Rodrigo Maranhão – and over 50 shows abroad, with full public and reviews acceptance in the Montreux Jazz Festival, North Sea Jazz Festival, Irving Plaza (NY), San Francisco Jazz Festival, among others.

Maria Rita was nominated for the BBC Radio 3 Awards for World Music in 2008. On 28 June 2008, she performed in London for the first time, with a production by Tuba Productions and JungleDrums Magazine.

== Discography ==
Studio Albums

| Album Title | Album details | Peak chart positions | | | |
| Album Title | Album details | BRA | EUA World | FIN | POR |
|---|---|---|---|---|---|
| Maria Rita | Released: 9 September 2003; Label: Warner Music; Format: CD, DVD, LP, DD; Sales: 1,500,000 | 5 | 3 | 20 | 1 |
| Segundo | Released: 9 September 2005; Label: Warner Music; Format: CD, DVD, DD; Sales: 350,000 | 5 | — | — | 5 |
| Samba Meu | Released: 9 September 2007; Label: Warner Music; Format: CD, DD; Sales: 300,000 | 10 | — | — | 13 |
| Elo | Released: 22 September 2011; Label: Warner Music; Format: CD, LP, DD; Sales: 100,000 | 9 | 10 | — | — |
| Coração a Batucar | Released: 11 April 2014; Label: Universal Music; Format: CD, LP, DD; Sales: 120,000 | 1 | — | — | — |
| Amor e Música | Released: 26 January 2018; Label: Universal Music; Format: CD, DD; Sales: 10,000 | 1 | — | — | — |

Live Albums

| Album Title | Album details | Peak chart positions | |
| Album Title | Album details | BRA | POR |
|---|---|---|---|
| Redescobrir | Released: 6 November 2012; Label: Universal Music; Format: CD, DD; Sales: 150,000 | 9 | 30 |
| Coração a Batucar – Edição Especial (Ao Vivo) | Released: 17 March 2015; Label: Universal Music; Format: DD; Sales: 50,000 | 1 | — |
| O Samba Em Mim: Ao Vivo na Lapa | Released: 24 June 2016; Label: Universal Music; Format: CD, DD; Sales: 30,000 | 1 | — |

Video Albums

| Album Title | Album details | Peak chart positions |
| Album Title | Album details | BRA |
|---|---|---|
| Maria Rita | Released: 2003; Label: Warner Music; Format: DVD; Sales: 180,000 | 2 |
| Segundo: Ao Vivo | Released: 2006; Label: Warner Music; Format: CD, DVD; Sales: 50,000 | 15 |
| Samba Meu: Ao Vivo | Released: 2008; Label: Warner Music; Format: DVD; Sales: 60,000 | — |
| Redescobrir | Released: 6 November 2012; Label: Warner Music; Format: DVD; Sales: 50,000 | 13 |
| O Samba em Mim – Ao Vivo na Lapa | Released: 24 June 2016; Label: Universal Music; Format: DVD; Sales: 30,000 | — |

Collected

| Album Title | Album details | |
| Album Title | Album details | BRA |
|---|---|---|
| Perfil | Released: 2009; Label: Som Livre; Format: CD; Sales: 40,000 | 17 |

== Singles ==
List of singles as lead artist, with selected chart positions, showing year released and album name
| Title | Year | Peak chart positions | Album |
| Title | Year | BRA | Album |
|---|---|---|---|
| "A Festa" | 2003 | 9 | Maria Rita |
| "Encontros E Despedidas" | 2004 | 34 | Maria Rita |
| "Caminho Das Águas" | 2005 | 21 | Segundo |
| "Tá Perdoado" | 2007 | 3 | Samba Meu |
| "O Homem Falou" | 2008 | 54 | Samba Meu |
| "Coração Em Desalinho" | 2011 | 19 | Elo |
| "Pra Matar Meu Coração" | 2011 | — | Elo |
| "Me Deixas Louca" | 2012 | 37 | Redescobrir |
| "Rumo ao Infinito" | 2014 | — | Coração A Batucar |
| "É Corpo, É Alma, É Religião" | 2015 | 34 | Coração A Batucar |
| "Bola Pra Frente (Ao Vivo)" | 2016 | — | O Samba Em Mim – Ao Vivo Na Lapa |
| "Amor e Música" | 2018 | 17 | Amor e Música |
| "Reza" | 2018 | 94 | Amor e Música |

As guest

- 1979 Realce, Gilberto Gil
- 1990 Made in Coracao, Toquinho/Sadao Watanabe
- 2003 Pietá, Milton Nascimento
- 2004 Chico Rey & Paraná Vol. 14, Chico Rey
- 2005 Coisas de Novela, Fabio Bartoleto
- 2005 Marcas de Batom, As Leoas
- 2006 12 Segundos de Oscuridad, Jorge Drexler
- 2007 Outro Rio, Ricardo Silveira
- 2010 BandaDois, Gilberto Gil
- 2010 Entren Los Que Quieran, Calle 13
- 2016 Alma Brasileira, Diogo Nogueira

== Awards and nominations ==
Latin Grammy Award

| Year | Nominee / work | Award | Result |
|---|---|---|---|
| 2004 | "A Festa" | Record of the Year | Nominated |
| 2004 | Maria Rita | Album of the Year | Nominated |
| 2004 | Maria Rita | Best MPB Album | Won |
| 2004 | Maria Rita | Best New Artist | Won |
| 2006 | Segundo | Best MPB Album | Won |
| 2006 | Maria Rita | Producer of the Year | Nominated |
| 2008 | Samba Meu^{1} | Best Samba/Pagode Album | Won |
| 2011 | "Latinoamérica" (as a feature artist) | Record of the Year | Won |
| 2012 | Elo | Best MPB Album | Nominated |
| 2013 | Redescobrir – Ao Vivo | Best MPB Album | Won |
| 2014 | Coração a Batucar | Best Samba/Pagode Album | Won |
| 2018 | Amor E Música | Best Samba/Pagode Album | Won |
| 2023 | Desse Jeito | Best Samba/Pagode Album | Nominated |

Prêmio Multishow de Música Brasileira

| 2003 | Result |
|---|---|
| Best New Artist (Solo) | Nominated |
| 2004 | Result |
| Best Album – Maria Rita | Nominated |
| Best Female Singer | Won |
| Best Song – A Festa (by Milton Nascimento) | Nominated |
| Best DVD – Maria Rita | Nominated |
| Best Show | Nominated |
| 2008 | Result |
| Best Album – Samba Meu | Won |
| Best Female Singer | Nominated |
| Best Song – Tá Perdoado | Nominated |

^{1}Tied with Paulinho da Viola for MTV Unplugged.
