= Ferrugem (singer) =

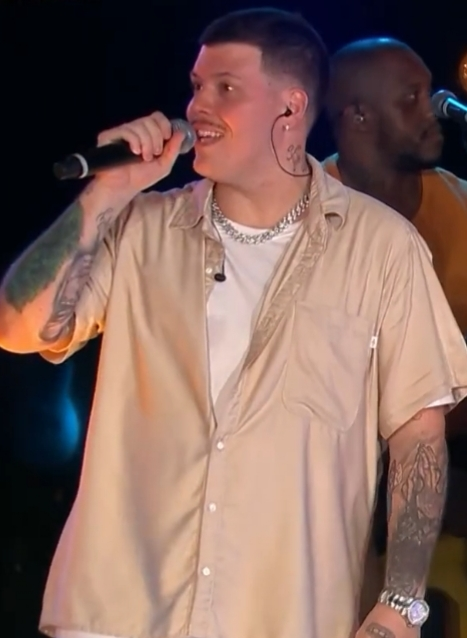

Background information
- Born: Jheison Failde de Souza; 20 October 1988 (age 37); Rio de Janeiro, Brazil
- Genres: Pagode, Samba
- Occupations: Singer; Composer
- Years active: 2009–present
- Spouse(s): Juliana Barbosa (2008–2015); Thais Vasconcelos (2018–present)

Jheison Failde de Souza (born 20 October 1988), better known by his artistic name Ferrugem, is a Brazilian singer and composer.

After gaining traction with the song "Climatizar" on the radio, Ferrugem signed with Warner Music Brasil and launched his debut album of the same name in 2015. His second album, Seja o Que Deus Quiser, was released in 2017. He began to receive visibility in Brazil, however, after the launch of his first DVD, Prazer, eu sou Ferrugem, released in 2018. The album yielded him a Latin Grammy nomination in the Best Samba/Pagode Album category. In 2019, he released his second lançou DVD Chão de Estrelas.

== Biography ==
Ferrugem was born on 20 October 1988 in Rio de Janeiro, the son of backing vocalist Maristela Failde. His stage name was made by a friend of his who nicknamed him "Ferrugem" (meaning "rust" in Portuguese) on account of him having red hair. The singer has mentioned that, in his youth, he had received ignorant comments due to him being the lone redhead in the roda de samba sessions he participated in, being nicknamed "Cabelo de Fogo" and "Fanta Laranja" by colleagues.

== Career ==
=== 2009–17: Climatizar and Seja o Que Deus Quiser ===
Due to his mother, he began to be interested in music as a child, frequently attending roda de samba sessions next to his city. At 13 years old, he bought a tan-tan and began to play and compose his own songs and went on the internet to upload them. This helped him to make important contacts to begin his music career. He gained various admirers in performing his song Mar Felicidade in Porto Alegre. In 2011, he got the opportunity to perform in São Paulo, creating the Roda De Samba do Vila Duca in the Vila Olímpia neighborhood. There, he presented "Meu Bem", which became a hit on São Paulo radio stations.

By 2014, he was managed by Gold Produções and would go on to sign a contract with Warner Music. In September, he released his first single Climatizar. On 9 February 2015, he released his first album, titled Climatizar, which included appearances by Anitta and Alcione. The album had as singles "Climatizar", "Tentei Ser Incrível", "Saudade Não é Solidão", "Ensaboado", and "Paciência", the latter appearing on the sound track for the musical telenovela Rock Story. On 10 February 2017, he launched his second album, titled Seja o Que Deus Quiser. Singles included "Eu Sou Feliz Assim", "O Som do Tambor", "Minha Namorada", and "Eu Juro".

=== 2018–present: Prazer, Eu Sou Ferrugem and Chão de Estrelas ===
On 16 March 2018, Ferrugem released his first live CD, titled Prazer, Eu Sou Ferrugem. The album included appearances by Péricles, Marcos & Belutti, Nego do Borel, Thiaguinho, Suel, Bruno Cardoso, and Ludmilla. O álbum teve como singles "Pirata e Tesouro", "Pra Você Acreditar", "É Natural" e "Sinto Sua Falta". He released his second live DVD in Rio de Janeiro called Chão de Estrelas, with participations by Zé Neto & Cristiano, Léo Santana, Ivete Sangalo, Belo, Lucas Lucco, Reinaldo, and Tiee. The album was released on 19 July and included as singles "Chopp Garotinho", "Nesse Embalo" E "Até Que Enfim".

== Personal life ==
From 2008 to 2015, Ferrugem was married to Juliana Barbosa, with whom they had a daughter, Júlia. After their separation, Barbosa died after a botched liposuction surgery. He would go on to raise their child as a single father. Since 2018, he has been married to Thais Vasconcelos, and they had two children, Sofia and Aurora.

== Discography ==
=== Studio albums ===
- Climatizar (2015)
- Seja o Que Deus Quiser (2017)

=== Live albums ===
- Prazer, eu sou Ferrugem (2018)
- Chão de Estrelas (2019)

== Awards and nominations ==
Year	Award	Category	Nomination	Result	Ref.
2016	Prêmio Multishow de Música Brasileira	Experimente	Ferrugem	Nominated	
2018	Grammy Latino	Best Samba/Pagode Album	Prazer, eu sou Ferrugem	Nominated	
2018	Melhores do Ano	Best singer	Ferrugem	Nominated	
2018	Prêmio Contigoǃ Online	Best singer	Ferrugem	Nominated	
2018	Prêmio F5	Best singer	Ferrugem	Won	
2019	Troféu Internet	Revelation of the Year	Ferrugem	Nominated	
2019	Multishow Brazilian Music Award	Best singer	Ferrugem	Nominated	
2019	Multishow Brazilian Music Award	Música Chiclete	"Atrasadinha" (with Felipe Araújo)	Nominated	
2019	Multishow Brazilian Music Award	Song of the Year	"Atrasadinha" (with Felipe Araújo)	Won	
2019	Melhores do Ano	Best Singer	Ferrugem	Nominated	
2019	Melhores do Ano	Song of the Year	"Atrasadinha" (with Felipe Araújo)	Won	
2019	Prêmio F5	Hit of the Year	"Atrasadinha" (with Felipe Araújo)	Nominated	
2019	Prêmio Contigo! Online	Song of the Year	"Atrasadinha" (with Felipe Araújo)	Nominated	
2020	Troféu Internet	Best singer	Ferrugem	Pending (cancelled due to COVID-19 pandemic)	
2020	Prêmio Área VIP	Hit of the Year	"Atrasadinha" (with Felipe Araújo)	Won	
