= Sorriso Maroto =

Brazilian band

- Origin: Rio de Janeiro, Brazil
- Genres: Pagode
- Years active: 1997–present
- Labels: Deckdisc, Som Livre, Universal Music Group, Sony Music
- Members: Bruno Cardoso; Cris Oliveira; Sérgio Jr. Fred Araújo; Vinícius Augusto
- Website: gruposorrisomaroto.com.br

Sorriso Maroto is a Brazilian pagode band originating from Rio de Janeiro, Brazil. It was formed in 1997 by singer and tambourine player Cris Oliveira, and later headed by singer-songwriter Bruno Cardoso. They have released ten albums.

== Career ==
The band was born in 1997 when a group of friends all from Grajaú, a suburb north of Rio de Janeiro, joined and started playing. The band's original lead singer was Cris Oliveira, 23 at the time. In 2002 with the debut album, Sorriso Maroto, the group started being featured on radio and by their second album Por Você they included romantic samba tunes and engaged in a tour with the live album and DVD Por Você: ao Vivo released in 2005 selling well above 120,000 copies. Their follow up album É Diferente in 2006 also resulted in another tour and the live CD and DVD É Diferente: Ao Vivo in 2007 celebrating a decade of career.

After ten years with Deckdisc, the Brazilian record label Som Livre released in 2009 their CD 100% Sorriso Maroto.

With Sinais, came the hit "E Agora Nós?" with a guest performance by Ivete Sangalo. In 2010 Ao Vivo em Recife was released by Universal Music Group as CD, DVD and on Blu-ray, the first for the band. It was recorded on August 7, 2010, at a concert at Marco Zeroo in Recife, in front of tens of thousands, and encompassing the band's biggest hits. On 1 March 2012, the group performed a show at Quinta da Boa Vista, on the birthday of the city of Rio de Janeiro. Album and DVD Sorriso 15 Anos – Ao Vivo celebrated the 15th anniversary of the band, and the participation of several artist in support like Jammil e Uma Noites, Trio Ternura, Coral Resgate, Revelação, Gusttavo Lima, amongst others.

The American musician Brian McKnight, rerecorded a new version of the band's 2002 hit "E Agora Nós?" version of the song retitled "Back at One". Michel Teló recorded "É Nóis Fazê Parapapá" in 2013, giving the band and its singer Bruno Cardoso greater international fame. Also in 2013, the band released Riscos e Certezas, an EP of six tracks. The bonus track "Fofinha Delícia (Excesso de Gostosura)" was used as theme song the soap opera Amor à Vida.

In 2015, their album Sorriso Eu Gosto – Ao Vivo No Maracanãzinho was nominated for the 16th Latin Grammy Awards in the Best Samba/Pagode Album category.

== Members ==
- Bruno Cardoso – vocals
- Cris Oliveira – tambourine
- Sérgio Jr. – guitar
- Fred Araújo – surdo (bass drum)
- Vinícius Augusto – keyboards

== Discography ==
Studio albums / DVDs

Year	Album title	Format	Record label
2002	Sorriso Maroto	CD	Deckdisc
2003	Por Você	CD	Deckdisc
2006	É Diferente	CD	Deckdisc
2008	100% Sorriso Maroto	CD	Som Livre
2009	Sinais	CD / DVD	Deckdisc
2016	De Volta Pro Amanhã	CD	Som Livre

EPs

Year	EP title	Format	Record label
2013	Riscos e Certezas	EP	Som Livre

Live albums / DVDs

Year	Album title	Format	Record label
2005	Por Você: Ao Vivo	CD / DVD	Deckdisc
2007	É Diferente: Ao Vivo	CD / DVD	Deckdisc
2010	Ao Vivo em Recife	CD / DVD / Blu-ray	Universal Music
2012	Sorriso 15 Anos - Ao Vivo	CD / DVD / Blu-ray	Som Livre
2014	Sorriso Eu Gosto - Ao Vivo no Maracanãzinho	CD / DVD	Som Livre
2017	De Volta Pro Amanhã: Ao Vivo	CD	Som Livre
2019	Ao Cubo, Ao Vivo, Em Cores	CD / DVD	Sony Music

=== Singles ===
Year	Title	Album
2001	Coração Deserto	Sorriso Maroto
2002	Ainda Gosto de Você	Sorriso Maroto
2003	Nada de Pensar em Despedida	Por Você
2003	Me Espera	Por Você
2003	Por Você	Por Você
2004	Diz Que Quer Ficar	Por Você
2004	Cadê Você	Por Você
2005	Me Olha Nos Olhos	Por Você: Ao Vivo
2005	Disfarça	Por Você: Ao Vivo
2006	Engano	Por Você: Ao Vivo
2006	Futuro Prometido	É Diferente
2007	Tenho Medo	É Diferente
2007	Em Suas Mãos	É Diferente
2007	O Que Tinha de Dar	É Diferente
2007	Não Tem Perdão	É Diferente: Ao Vivo
2008	Faz Assim	É Diferente: Ao Vivo
2008	Fica Combinado Assim	É Diferente: Ao Vivo
2008	A Primeira Namorada	É Diferente: Ao Vivo
2008	Amanhã	É Diferente: Ao Vivo
2009	Ainda Existe Amor em Nós	Sinais
2009	Sinais	Sinais
2009	E Agora Nós? (feat. Ivete Sangalo)	Sinais
2010	Na Cama	Ao Vivo em Recife
2011	Clichê	Ao Vivo em Recife
2011	Quem Tá Solteiro Nunca Fica Só	Ao Vivo em Recife
2012	Assim Você Mata o Papai	Sorriso 15 Anos - Ao Vivo
2012	Se Eu Te Pego, Te Envergo	Sorriso 15 Anos - Ao Vivo
2012	Vai e Chora	Sorriso 15 Anos - Ao Vivo
2013	Brigas Por Nada (feat. Coral Resgate)	Sorriso 15 Anos - Ao Vivo
2013	Fofinha Delícia	Riscos e Certezas
2013	Mais Fácil (Easier) (Sorriso feat. Brian McKnight)	Riscos e Certezas
2013	Guerra Fria (feat. Jorge & Mateus)	Riscos e Certezas
2014	Tá Bom, Aham	Riscos e Certezas
2014	Pra Você Escutar	Riscos e Certezas
2014	Instigante	Sorriso Eu Gosto - Ao Vivo no Maracanãzinho
2015	1 Metro e 65	Sorriso Eu Gosto - Ao Vivo no Maracanãzinho
2015	Lua de Mel	Sorriso Eu Gosto - Ao Vivo no Maracanãzinho
2015	Tudo Tem Saída (feat. Bom Gosto)	Sorriso Eu Gosto - Ao Vivo no Maracanãzinho
2016	Dependente	De Volta Pro Amanhã
2016	Indiferença	De Volta Pro Amanhã
2017	Eu Já Te Quis Um Dia	De Volta Pro Amanhã
2017	Anjos Guardiões de Amor	De Volta Pro Amanhã: Ao Vivo
2018	Chave e Cadeado	Non-Album Single
2018	O Impossível	Non-Album Single
2019	Escondido dos Seus Pais	Ao Cubo, Ao Vivo, Em Cores
2019	50 Vezes (feat. Dilsinho)	Ao Cubo, Ao Vivo, Em Cores
2019	Reprise	Ao Cubo, Ao Vivo, Em Cores

Featured in

Year	Title
2009	Onde Eu Errei (Bruno Miguel feat. Sorriso Maroto)
2012	É Nóis Faze Parapapá (Michel Teló feat. Sorriso Maroto)
2019	"Pouco a Pouco" – (Dilsinho feat. Sorriso Maroto)
