= Dilsinho =

Brazilian singer-songwriter (born 1992)

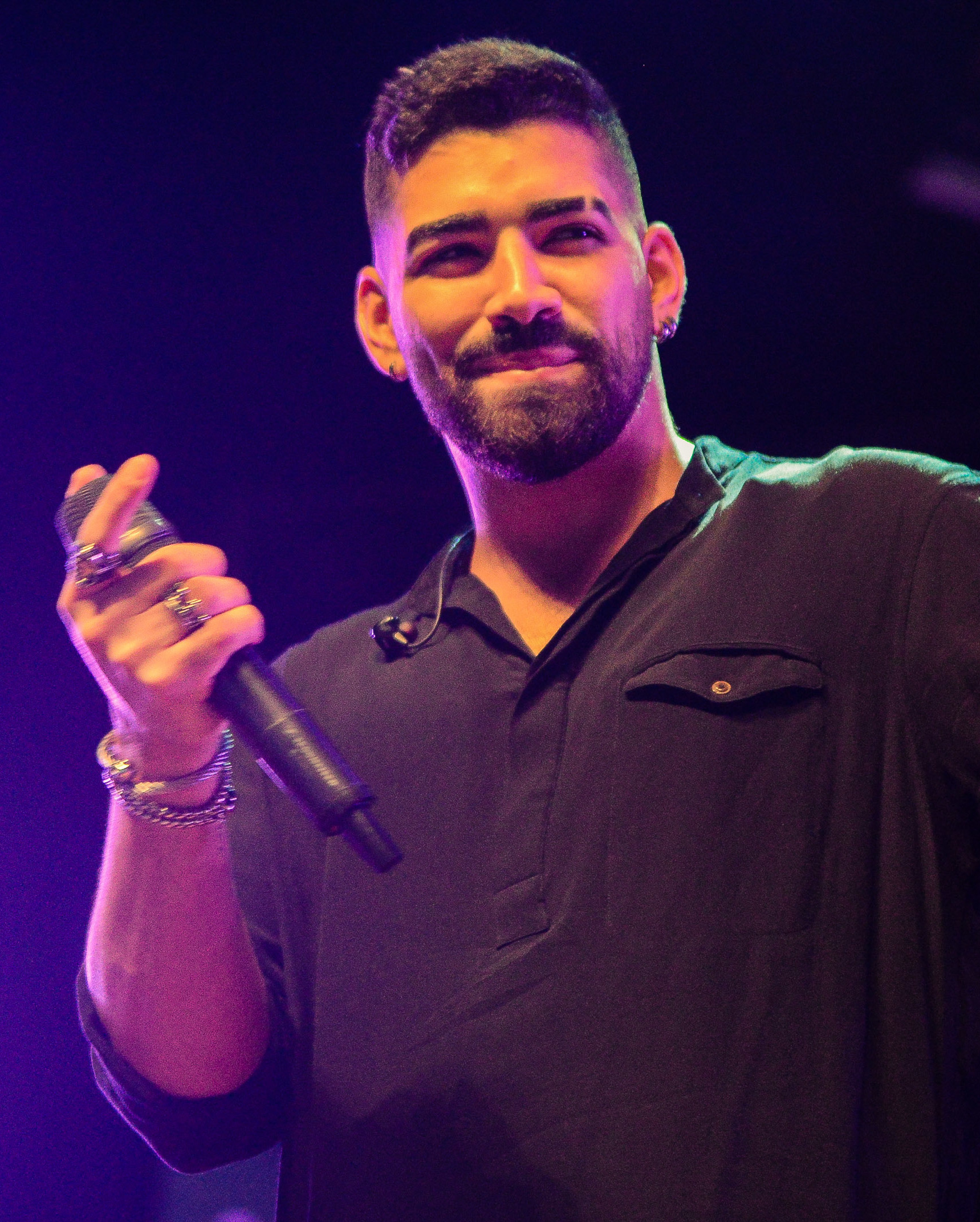
- Dilsinho at Citibank Hall, São Paulo (2021)
- Born: Dilson Scher Neto; 26 June 1992 (age 33); Rio de Janeiro, Brazil
- Occupation: Singer-songwriter
- Years active: 2009-present
- Musical career
- Genres: Pagode; Pop
- Labels: Universal Music, Inc. (2014–15); Sony Music (2016–present)
- Website: www.dilsinho.net/novo/

Dilson Scher Neto (born 26 June 1992), best known as Dilsinho, is a Brazilian singer-songwriter.

== Biography ==
Born in Rio de Janeiro, Dilsinho started his professional career in 2009, as a member of the band Para de Kaô. In 2013, following the disbandment of the group, he started his solo career, and in 2014 he released his debut album, the eponymous Dilsinho.

In 2019, Dilsinho's song "Péssimo Negócio" was the most played song on Brazilian radio stations and it was certified triple diamond, while his live album Terra do Nunca also received a diamond certification. The same year, he was awarded best singer at the Multishow Brazilian Music Awards.

== Discography ==
Studio albums

- Dilsinho (2014)
- O Cara Certo (2016)
- Quarto e Sala (2019)
- Garrafas e Bocas (2021)
- Juntos (with Sorriso Maroto) (2022)

Live albums

- #SML Fora da Curva (2017)
- Terra do Nunca (2019)
- Open House (2020)
- Juntos - Ao Vivo no Rio de Janeiro (with Sorriso Maroto) (2022)
- Diferentão (2023)
