= Gabriel Diniz =

Brazilian singer-songwriter (1990–2019)

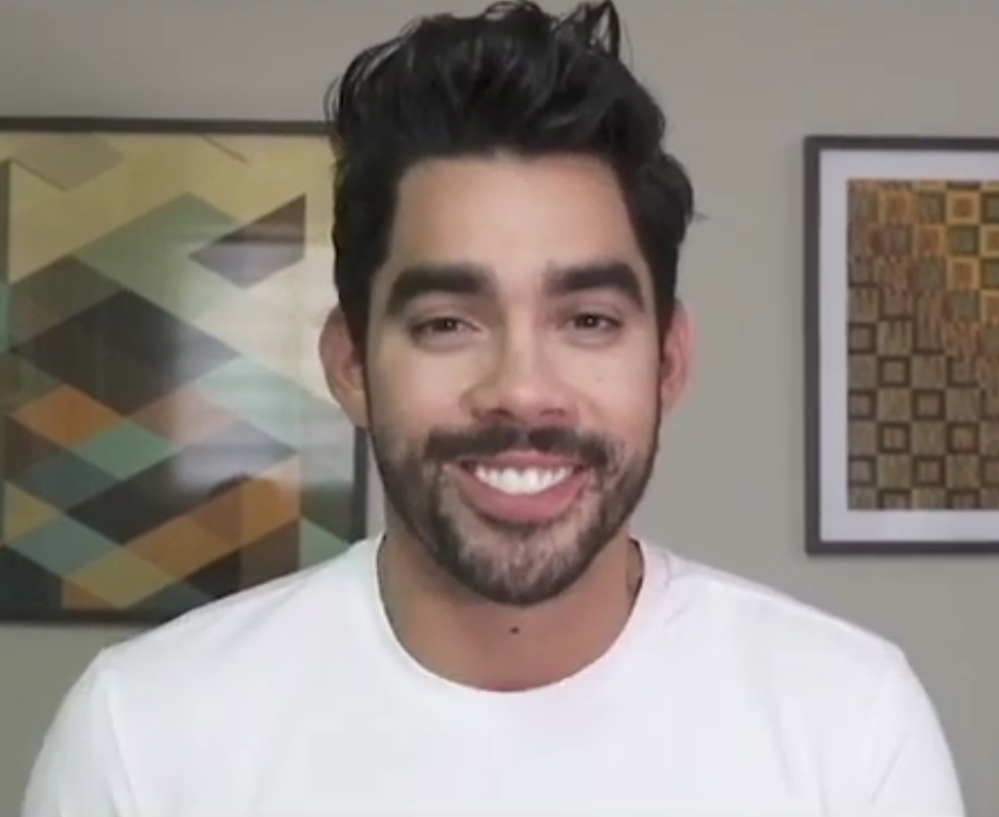
- Diniz in 2019
- Born: José Gabriel de Souza Diniz; 18 October 1990; Campo Grande, Mato Grosso do Sul, Brazil
- Died: 27 May 2019 (aged 28); Estância, Sergipe, Brazil
- Occupations: Singer; songwriter
- Years active: 2008–2019
- Musical career
- Genres: Forró eletrônico; forró; sertanejo universitário; arrocha
- Instruments: Vocals; guitar
- Label: Universal Music
- Website: gabrieldiniz.com.br

José Gabriel de Souza Diniz (18 October 1990 – 27 May 2019), better known as Gabriel Diniz, was a Brazilian singer-songwriter.

== Career ==
Born in Campo Grande, Mato Grosso do Sul, he released three studio albums during his short career. In 2017, he released the song titled "Acabou Acabou", a collaboration with Wesley Safadão.

Diniz became nationally known by the single "Jenifer", a song that was the most played on the radio and music streaming sites of Brazil, becoming the hit of the summer of 2019.

Although born in Campo Grande, he moved with his family to João Pessoa, in Paraíba(northeast region) where he was raised. Gabriel Diniz started his career as a musician singing at some parties at his college, where he studied electrical engineering. His first steps started with his friends, who created a garage band, attracting businessmen from the city. He went through bands like Campim com Mel and Cavaleiros do Forró, and later joined his main band: Forró na Farra, between 2010 and 2011.

In 2013, he changed the name of his band to his own name: Gabriel Diniz. He innovated by joining two musical genres typical of brazil's northeast region: Forró and swingueira (pagode baiano), highlighting percussion.

== Death ==
On 27 May 2019, Diniz died in a plane crash after a concert in Sergipe in Estância, Brazil on his way to surprise his girlfriend for her birthday party. The aircraft was a Piper PA-28 Cherokee manufactured in 1974 registered PT-KLO.
