= Diogo Nogueira =

Brazilian singer (born 1981)

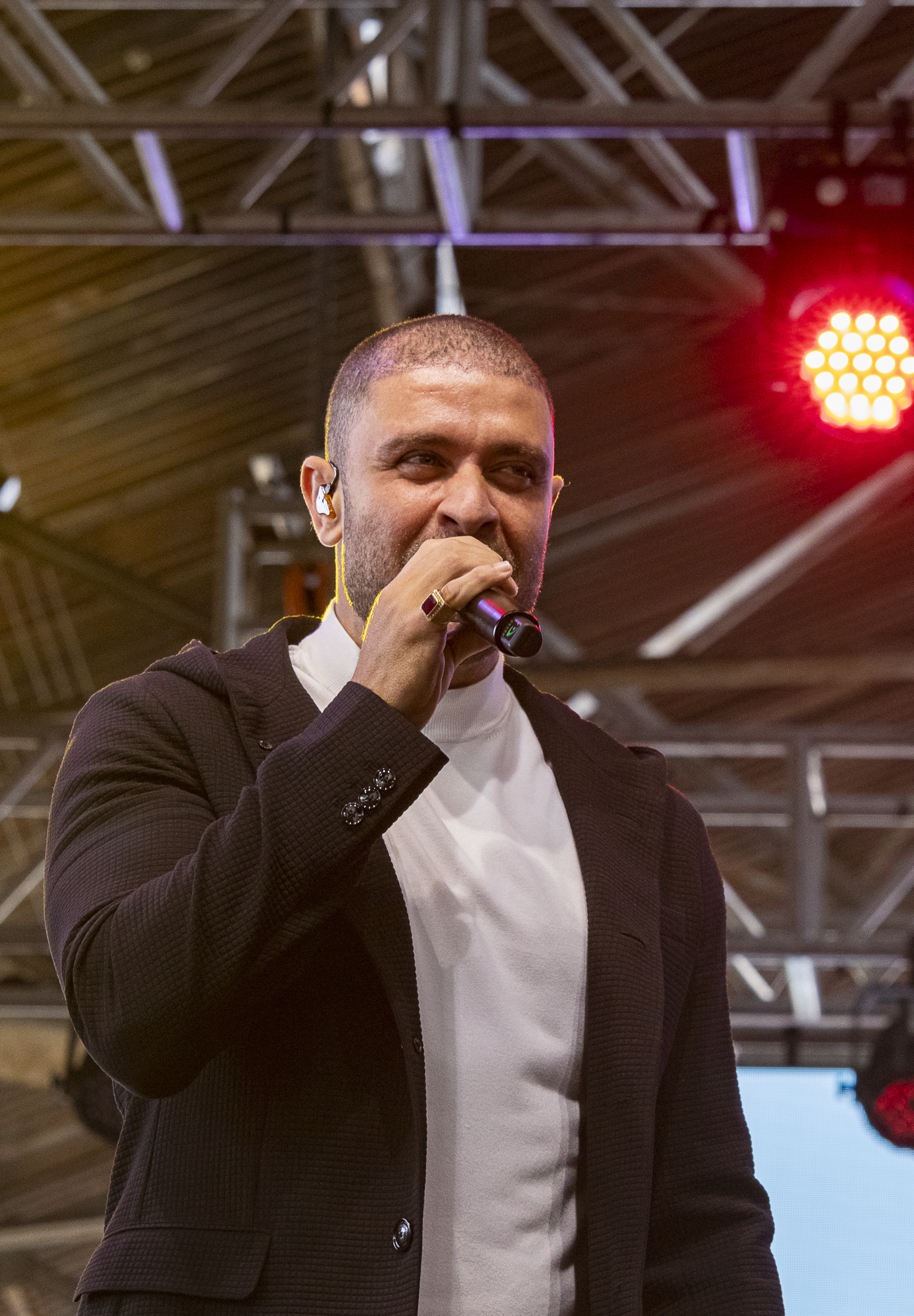
- Nogueira in 2022

Background information
- Born: 26 April 1981 (age 45); Rio de Janeiro, Brazil
- Genres: Samba; MPB; pagode; Salsa
- Occupations: Singer; songwriter
- Years active: 2015

Diogo Nogueira (born 26 April 1981) is a Brazilian singer and songwriter. He is the son of composer João Nogueira and Ângela Maria Nogueira.

== Early life ==
He was a samba musician throughout childhood and adolescence, but became a football player.

== Career ==
After a serious knee injury, Nogueira decided to venture into the already well-known path of samba and released the CD and DVD Live, recorded at the Teatro João Caetano in Rio de Janeiro. In 2015, his album Bossa Negra, a partnership with Hamilton de Holanda, was nominated for the 16th Latin Grammy Awards in the Best Samba/Pagode Album category. The title track of the album was also nominated for the same award, in the Best Brazilian Song category. In the 2017 Award, his album Alma Brasileira was nominated in the same category as Bossa Negra and his song "Pé na Areia" was nominated in the same category (now renamed as Best Portuguese Language Song) as "Bossa Negra".

In 2021, his album Samba de Verão was nominated for the Latin Grammy Award for Best Samba/Pagode Album.

== Discography ==
- Um sonho através do espelho ("A Dream through the Mirror", various, 2001, CD Jam Music)
- Cidade do Samba ("Samba City", various, 2007, CD ZecaPagodiscos / Universal Music)
- Ao Vivo ("Live", 2007, CD and DVD EMI Music)
- Tô Fazendo a Minha Parte ("I'm Doing My Part", 2009, CD EMI Music)
- Sou Eu Ao Vivo ("I Am", 2010, CD e DVD EMI Music)
- Poder da Criação (coletânea) (2011, CD EMI Music)

== See also ==
- Tiro ao Álvaro
