= Nei Lopes =

Brazilian singer, composer, lawyer, writer, and historian

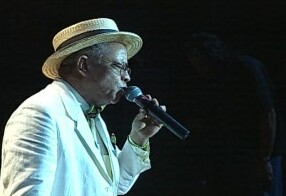
- Nei Lopes

Background information
- Born: May 9, 1942 (age 84); Irajá, Rio de Janeiro, Brazil
- Genres: Samba

Nei Braz Lopes (born May 9, 1942 in Irajá, Rio de Janeiro) is a Brazilian singer, composer, lawyer, writer and historian, specializing in Afro-Brazilian studies.

== Biography ==
Born in Irajá in Rio de Janeiro (a traditional samba neighborhood which also brought us Zeca Pagodinho, among others), Nei Lopes graduated as an attorney at law from the University of Brazil, but at the start of the 70's abandoned his recently begun legal career to dedicate himself to music and literature. A professional composer since 1972, Nei Lopes became prominent especially through his partnership with Wilson Moreira and by their work, recorded by almost all interpreters of traditional samba. In the 80s, Nei, already acclaimed, was one of the supporters of the Pagode movement, which took samba back to the airwaves after an eclipse period.

In the 90's, Nei started partnerships with people identified with the MPB label, such as composer Guinga and Zé Renato. He also has a song with Chico Buarque.

Nei is the author of a vast book opus concerning Afro-Brazilian thematics, and samba thematics in particular. He has been working, since 1995, in the Brazilian Encyclopedia of the African Diaspora.

== Discography ==
With Wilson Moreira:

- 1980 - A Arte Negra de Wilson Moreira & Nei Lopes - EMI
- 1985 - O Partido Muito Alto de Wilson Moreira & Nei Lopes - EMI

(These were later released as a single CD)

Individually:

- 1983 - Negro Mesmo - Lira-Continental
- 1996 - Canto Banto - Saci
- 1999 - Sincopando o Breque - CPC-Umes
- 2000 - De Letra & Música - Velas
- 2005 - Partido ao Cubo - Fina Flor

== Literature ==
- 1981 - O Samba na Realidade
- 1988 - Bantos, Malês e Identidade Negra
- 1992 - O Negro no Rio de Janeiro e sua Tradição Musical
- 1996 - Dicionário Banto do Brasil (Brazilian Banto Dictionary)
- 1999 - 171 - Lapa-Irajá - Casos e Enredos do Samba - Folha Seca
- 2000 - Zé Keti, O Samba sem Senhor
- 2000 - Logunedé, Santo Menino que Velho Respeita
- 2005 - Partido Alto: Samba de Bamba - Pallas
- 2008 - Historia e Cultura Africana e Afro Brasileira
- 2009 - Chutando o balde
- 2015 - Dicionário da História Social do Samba (Social history of Samba dictionary), ISBN 9788520012581
- 2019 - O preto que falava iídiche
- 2019 - Agora serve o coração
- 2019 - Afro-Brasil Reluzente ISBN 9788520944820
