= Samba Meu =

Studio album by Maria Rita
- Released: 2007
- Genre: Samba, MPB
- Length: 46:40
- Language: Portuguese
- Label: Warner Music Brazil
- Producer: Leandro Sapucahy, Maria Rita

Maria Rita chronology
Segundo (2005)	Samba Meu (2007)	Elo (2011)

Samba Meu (en: "My Samba") is Brazilian vocalist Maria Rita's third album, released in 2007 and distributed internationally by Warner Music Brazil. It was Maria Rita's first album of samba music. It won a 2008 Latin Grammy Award for Best Samba/Pagode album, and has been certified platinum in Brazil.

== Track listing ==
1. "Samba Meu" (Rodrigo Bittencourt) – 2:09
2. "O Homem Falou" (Gonzaguinha) – 3:54
3. "Maltratar, Não é Direito" (Arlindo Cruz, Franco) – 3:44
4. "Num Corpo Só" (Arlindo Cruz, Picolé) – 3:58
5. "Cria" (Serginho Meriti, Cesar Belieny) – 3:33
6. "Tá Perdoado" (Franco, Arlindo Cruz) – 3:46
7. "Pra Declarar Minha Saudade" (Jr. Dom, Arlindo Cruz) – 1:40
8. "O Que é o Amor" (Arlindo Cruz, Maurição, Fred Camacho) – 3:39
9. "Trajetória" (Arlindo Cruz, Serginho Meriti, Franco) – 4:15
10. "Mente ao Meu Coração" (F. Malfitano) – 3:48
11. "Novo Amor" (Edu Krieger) – 2:55
12. "Maria do Socorro" (Edu Krieger) – 3:11
13. "Corpitcho" (Ronaldo Barcellos, Picolé) – 3:05
14. "Casa de Noca" (Serginho Meriti, Nei Jota Carlos, Elson Do Pagode) – 3:10
