= Martinho da Vila =

Brazilian singer and composer (born 1938)

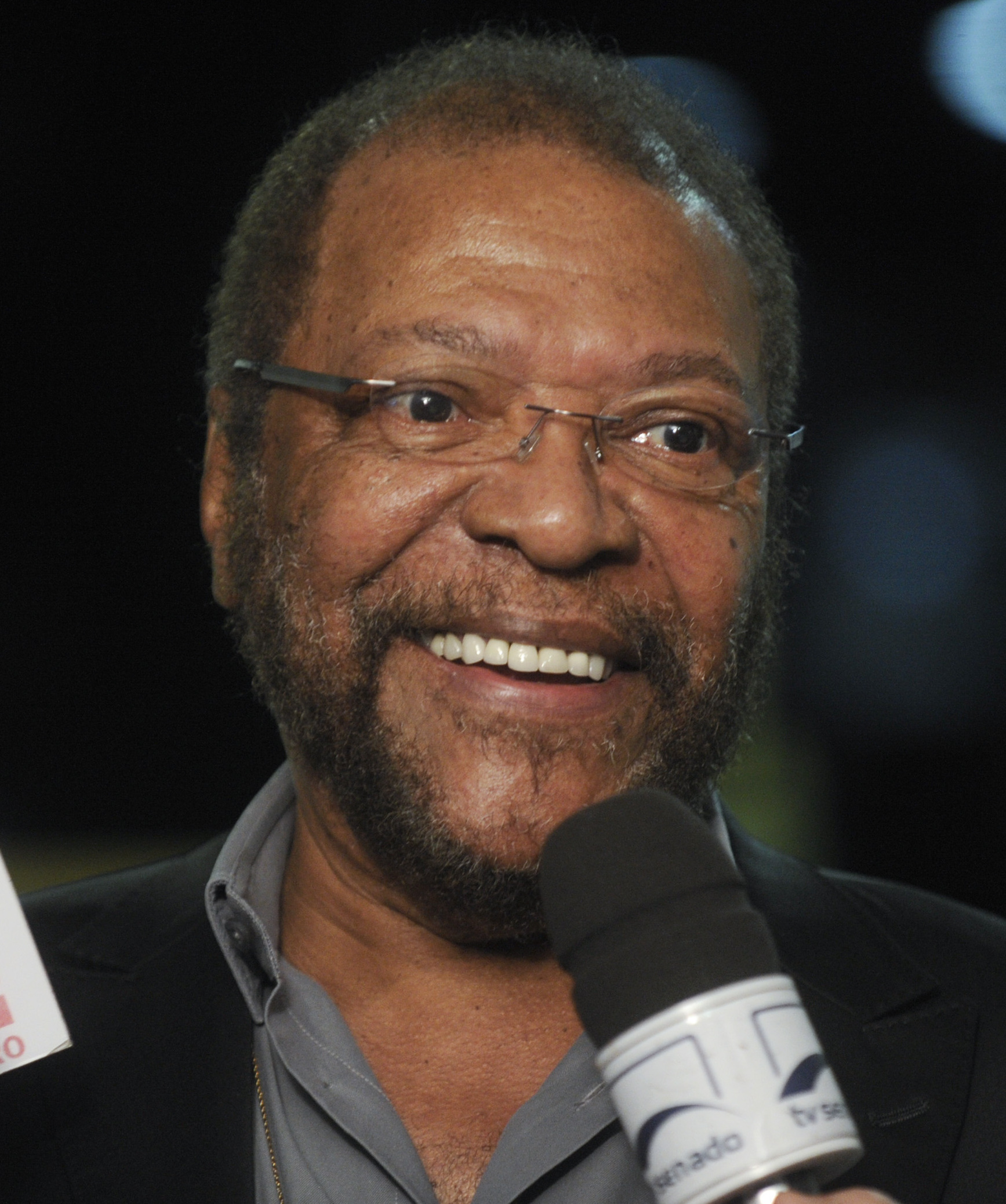
- Martinho da Vila in 2014

Background information
- Born: Martinho José Ferreira; February 12, 1938 (age 88)
- Origin: Duas Barras, Brazil
- Genres: Samba; MPB
- Occupations: Singer; songwriter; composer; writer; percussionist
- Instruments: Vocals; percussion
- Years active: 1967–present

Martinho da Vila (born February 12, 1938) is a Brazilian singer-songwriter, composer, and percussionist, who is widely considered to be a pioneer of samba and MPB.

== Biography ==
Martinho da Vila debuted at the III Festival of Record, in 1967, when he entered the competition with the song "Menina Moça". The following year, during the fourth edition of the Festival of Record, Da Vila found success with the song "Casa de Bamba". His debut album, released in 1969, entitled Martinho da Vila, became a commercial success, which, in addition to "Casa de Bamba", produced the singles "O Pequeno Burguês", "Quem é do Mar não enjoa" and "Pra que Dinheiro" among other gems such as "Brasil Mulato", "Amor pra que Nasceu" and "Tom Maior".

Da Vila soon became one of the best selling artists in Brazil. He was the first samba recording artist to sell more than one million copies, with the CD Tá Delícia, Tá Gostoso released in 1995, after Agepê, who in 1984 sold a million and a half copies with his Mistura Brasileira album.

At the closing ceremony of the 2016 Rio Olympics, Martinho performed onstage in the Maracanã Stadium, singing "Carinhoso" with his three daughters and granddaughter.

== Awards ==
Da Vila has received several accolades throughout his career, among which are Carioca Citizen (for citizens of Rio de Janeiro), Citizen Benefactor of the state of Rio de Janeiro, Commander of the official degree in Republic and the Order of Cultural Merit, for his contribution to Brazilian culture. In his musical career, in 1991, Martinho won the Shell Award for Brazilian Popular Music. In 2014, he was nominated to the Latin Grammy for Best Samba / Pagode Album. In 2021, da Vila was one of the recipients of the Latin Grammy Lifetime Achievement Award, and his album Rio: Só Vendo a Vista was nominated in the same ceremony in the Best Samba/Pagode Album category.

His album Negra Ópera was chosen by the Associação Paulista de Críticos de Arte as one of the 50 best Brazilian albums of 2023.

== Samba School ==
His collaboration with the GRES Unidos de Vila Isabel began in 1965. Before that, he performed frequently alongside the Aprendizes da Boca do Mato samba school. Since joining Vila Isabel, he has written dozens of songs for the school. He wrote the samba "Kizomba: A Festa da Raça", which won the Special Group title in 1988.

After a 17-year hiatus, in 2010, Martinho won the sambas enredo contest, providing the school's theme - Noel Rosa, another composer of Vila Isabel, to celebrate his centenary. Martinho had said that would be his last samba enredo. In 2013, when Martinho turned 75, his son Tonico da Vila took Vila Isabel to the title with the theme "A Vila Canta o Brasil, Celeiro do Mundo. Água no Feijão, que Chegou Mais Um".

== Discography ==
- 1969 – Martinho da Vila – (RCA Victor)
- 1970 – Meu Laiá-raiá – (RCA Victor)
- 1971 – Memórias de um Sargento de Milícias – (RCA Victor)
- 1972 – Batuque na Cozinha – (RCA Victor)
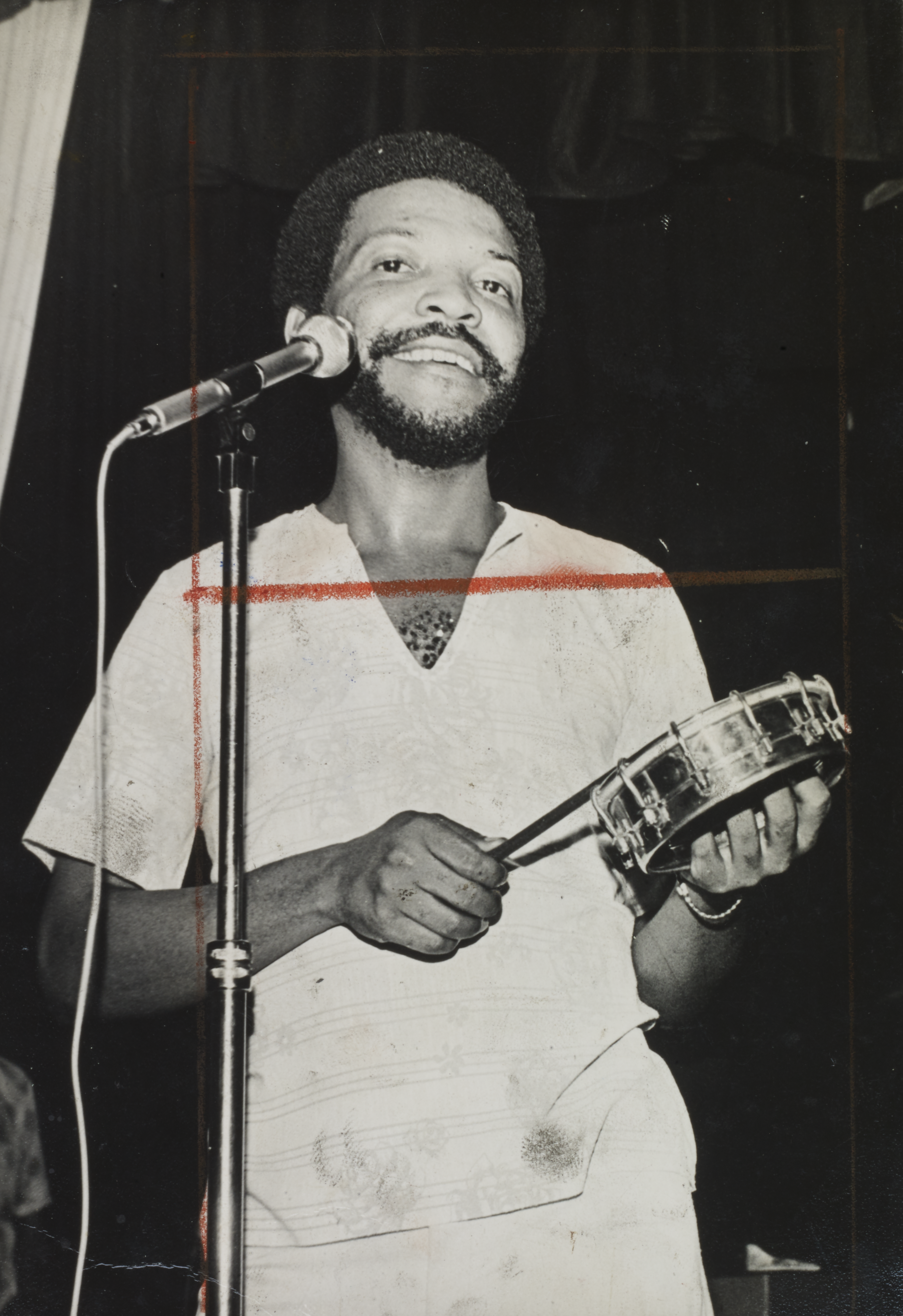
- Martinho da Vila, 1973. National Archives of Brazil.
  1973 – Origens (Pelo telefone) – (RCA Victor)
- 1974 – Canta Canta, Minha Gente – (RCA Victor)
- 1975 – Maravilha de Cenário – (RCA Victor)
- 1976 – Rosa do Povo – (RCA Victor)
- 1976 – La Voglia La Pazzia/L'Incoxienza/L' Allegria – (RCA Victor)
- 1977 – Presente – (RCA Victor)
- 1978 – Tendinha – (RCA Victor)
- 1979 – Terreiro, Sala e Salão – (RCA Victor)
- 1980 – Portuñol Latinoamericano – (RCA Victor)
- 1980 – Samba Enredo – (RCA Victor)
- 1981 – Sentimentos – (RCA Victor)
- 1982 – Verso e Reverso – (RCA Victor)
- 1983 – Novas Palavras – (RCA Victor)
- 1984 – Martinho da Vila Isabel – (RCA Victor)
- 1984 – Partido Alto Nota 10 – (CID)
- 1985 – Criações e Recriações – (RCA Victor)
- 1986 – Batuqueiro – (RCA Victor)
- 1987 – Coração Malandro – (RCA Victor/Ariola)
- 1988 – Festa da Raça – (CBS)
- 1989 – O Canto das Lavadeiras – (CBS)
- 1990 – Martinho da Vida – (CBS)
- 1991 – Vai Meu Samba, Vai – (Columbia/Sony Music)
- 1992 – No Templo da Criação– (Columbia/Sony Music)
- 1992 – Martinho da Vila – (Columbia/Sony Music)
- 1993 – Escola de Samba Enredo Vila Isabel – (Columbia/Sony Music)
- 1994 – Ao Rio de Janeiro (Columbia/Sony Music)
- 1995 – Tá Delícia, tá Gostoso – (Sony Music)
- 1997 – Coisas de Deus – (Sony Music)
- 1997 – Butiquim do Martinho – (Sony Music) 758.325/2-479455
- 1997 – Serie Aplauso – (BMG) 7432130556-2
- 1999 – 3.0 Turbinado ao Vivo – (Sony Music)
- 1999 – Pai da Alegria – (Sony Music)
- 2000 – Lusofonia – (Sony Music)
- 2001 – Martinho da Vila, da Roça e da Cidade– (Sony Music)
- 2002 – Martinho Definitivo – (Sony Music)
- 2002 – Voz e Coração – (Sony Music)
- 2003 – Martinho da Vila – Conexões – (MZA)
- 2004 – Conexões Ao Vivo – (MZA/Universal Music Group)
- 2005 – Brasilatinidade – (MZA/EMI)
- 2006 – Brasilatinidade Ao Vivo – (MZA/EMI)
- 2006 – Martinho José Ferreira – Ao Vivo na Suíça – (MZA/Universal Music) (recording-shows at Montreux Jazz Festival, in Switzerland, nellin 1988, 2000 and 2006)
- 2007 – Martinho da Vila do Brasil e do Mundo (MZA / Universal Music)
- 2008 – O Pequeno Burguês – ao vivo (MZA Music)
- 2010 – Poeta Da Cidade – Canta Noel

== Gallery ==
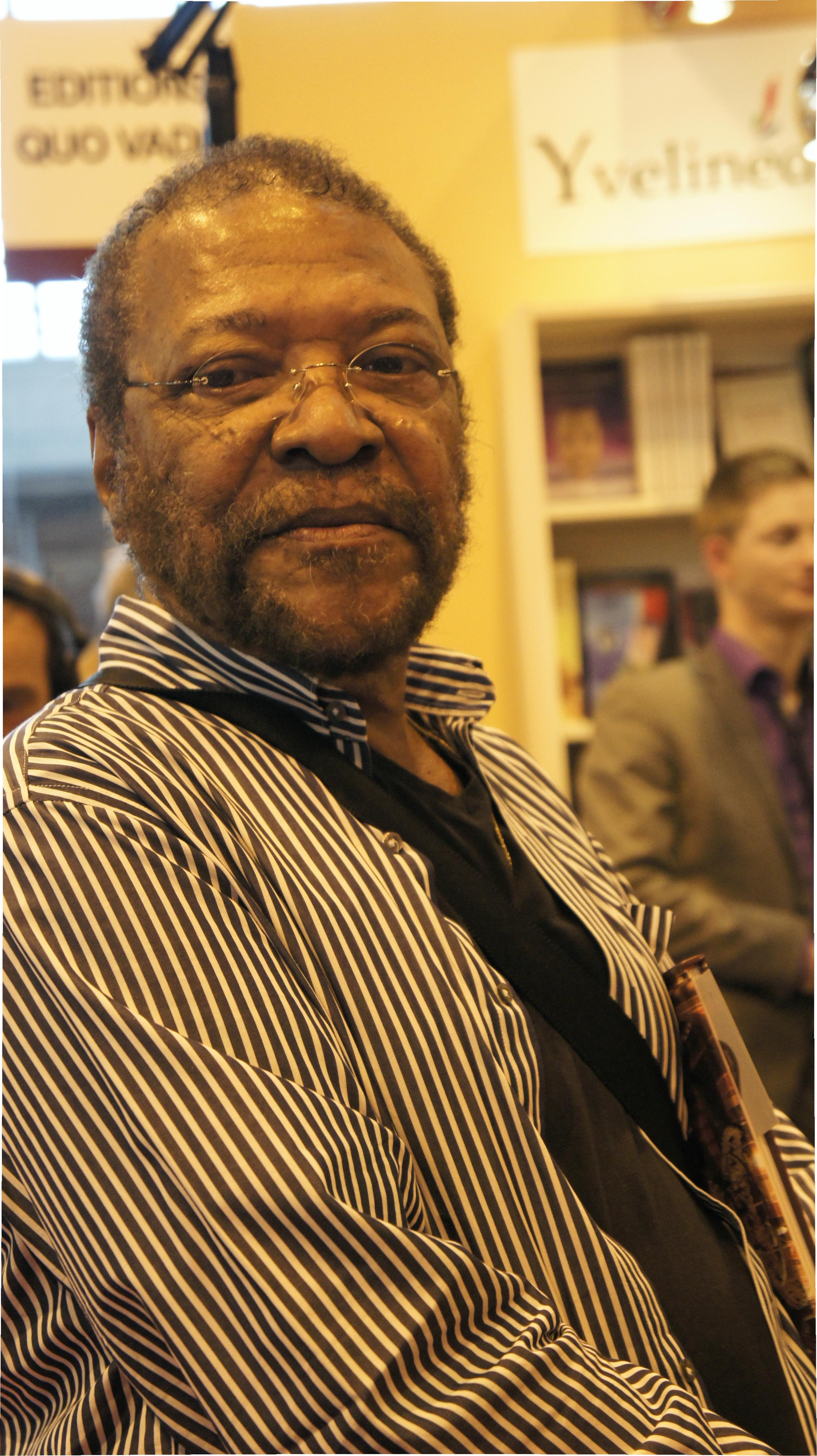
Martinho da Vila at Salon du livre de Paris in 2012.

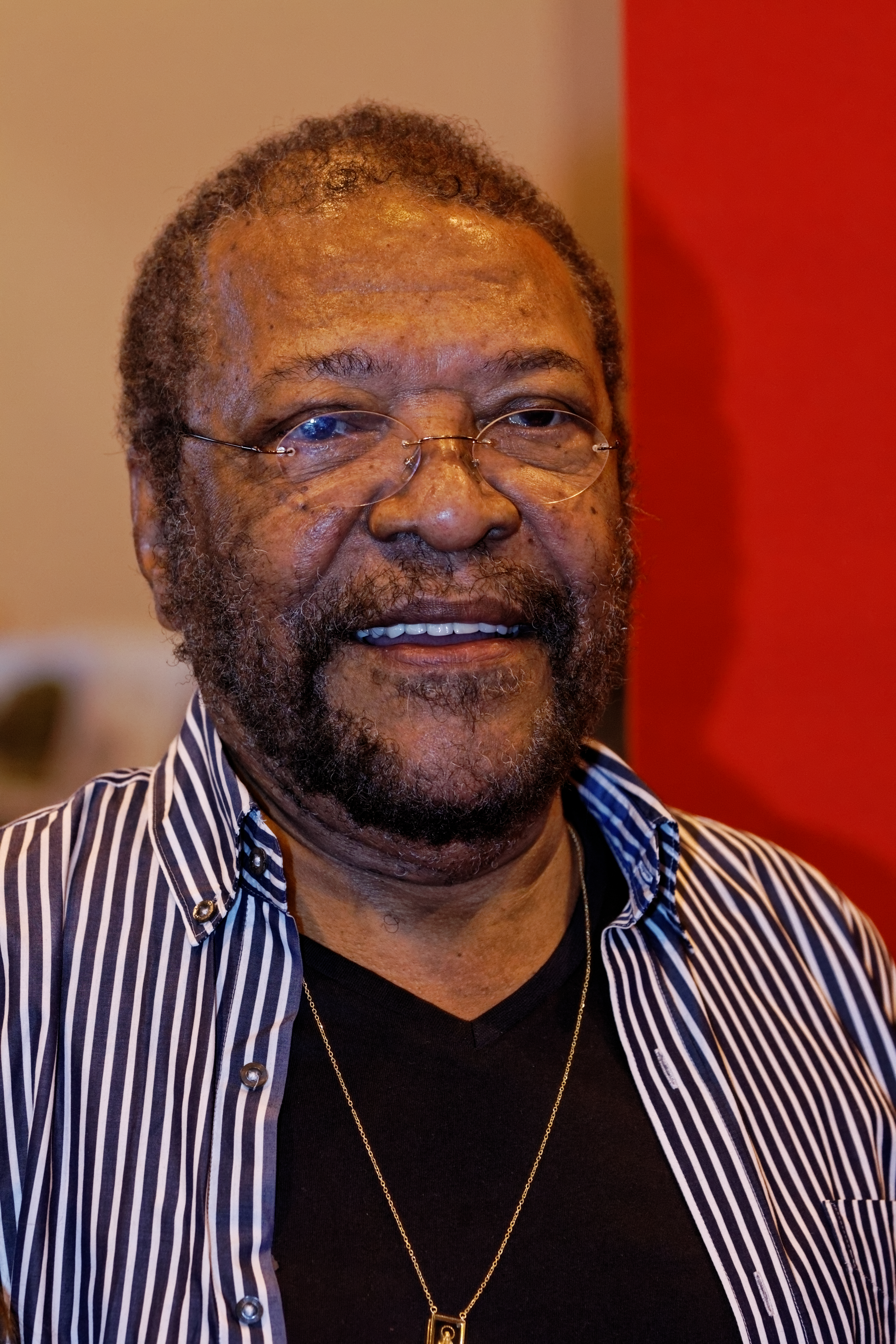
At Salon du livre de Paris in 2012.
