= List of SuperVia stations =

The SuperVia network in Rio de Janeiro, Brazil is made up of 102 stations across eight rail lines and one cable car line.

== Current stations ==
station	Location	Line	Connections
Adeus station	Complexo do Alemão	Teleférico A	
Agostinho Porto station	São João de Meriti	Belford Roxo	
Alemão station	Complexo do Alemão	Teleférico A	
Anchieta station	Parque Anchieta	Japeri	
Augusto Vasconcelos station	Senador Vasconcelos	Santa Cruz	
Austin station	Nova Iguaçu	Japeri	
Baiana station	Complexo do Alemão	Teleférico A	
Bangu station	Bangu	Santa Cruz	
Barros Filho station	Barros Filho	Belford Roxo	
Belford Roxo station	Belford Roxo	Belford Roxo	
Benjamin do Monte station	Inhoaiba	Santa Cruz	
Bento Ribeiro station	Bento Ribeiro	Deodoro	
Bonsucesso station	Bonsucesso	Saracuruna; Teleférico A	(integrated train/cable car station)
Brás de Pina station	Bras de Pina	Saracuruna	
Campo Grande station	Campo Grande	Santa Cruz	TransOeste (integrated BRT/SuperVia station)
Campos Elíseos station	Campos Eliseos	Saracuruna	
Cascadura station	Quintino Bocaiuva	Deodoro; Santa Cruz; Japeri	
Cavalcanti station	Cavalcanti	Belford Roxo	
Central do Brasil	Centro	Deodoro; Santa Cruz; Japeri; Belford Roxo; Saracuruna	Line 1, Line 2 (integrated Metro/SuperVia station); Teleférico da Providência (external transfer)
Citrolândia station	Citrolandia	Guapimirim	
Coelho da Rocha station	Coelho da Rocha	Belford Roxo	
Comendador Soares station	Morro Agudo	Japeri	
Cordovil station	Cordovil	Saracuruna	
Corte 8 station	Corte Oito	Saracuruna	
Cosmos station	Cosmos	Santa Cruz	
Costa Barros station	Costa Barros	Belford Roxo	
Del Castilho station	Del Castilho	Belford Roxo	Line 2 - Nova América/Del Castilho station (external connection)
Deodoro station	Deodoro	Deodoro; Santa Cruz; Japeri	
Duque de Caxias station	Jardim 25 de Agosto	Saracuruna	
Edson Passos station	Edson Passos	Japeri	
Engenheiro Pedreira station	Alecrim	Japeri	
Engenho Novo station	Engenho Novo	Deodoro	
Olímpica de Engenho de Dentro station	Engenho de Dentro	Deodoro; Santa Cruz; Japeri	Access to Estádio Olímpico João Havelange
Fragoso station	Fragoso	Vila Inhomirim	
Gramacho station	Vila Sarapuí	Saracuruna	
Guapimirim station	Guapimirim	Guapimirim	
Guilherme da Silveira station	Bangu	Santa Cruz	
Honório Gurgel station	Honório Gurgel	Belford Roxo	
Imbariê station	Imbariê	Vila Inhomirim	
Inhoaíba station	Inhoaíba	Santa Cruz	
Iriri station	Magé	Guapimirim	
Itararé station	Complexo do Alemão	Teleférico A	
Jacarezinho station	Jacarezinho	Belford Roxo	
Japeri station	Japeri	Japeri; Paracambi	
Jardim Guapimirim station	Guapimirim	Guapimirim	Formerly known as Parada Capim station
Jardim Nova Marília station	Magé	Guapimirim	
Jardim Primavera station	Duque de Caxias	Saracuruna	
Jororó station	Magé	Guapimirim	
Lages station	Paracambi	Paracambi	
Madureira station	Madureira	Deodoro; Santa Cruz; Japeri	TransCarioca (integrated BRT/SuperVia station)
Magalhães Bastos station	Magalhães Bastos	Santa Cruz	
Magé station	Magé	Guapimirim	
Mangueira station	Mangueira	Deodoro	
Manguinhos station	Manguinhos	Saracuruna	
Manoel Belo station	Duque de Caxias	Vila Inhomirim	
Maracanã station	Maracanã	Deodoro; Santa Cruz; Japeri; Belford Roxo; Saracuruna	Line 2 (integrated Metro/SuperVia station); Access to Maracanã Stadium
Marechal Hermes station	Marechal Hermes	Deodoro	
Méier station	Méier	Deodoro	
Mercadão de Madureira station	Madureira	Belford Roxo	
Mesquita station	Mesquita	Japeri	
Morabi station	Duque de Caxias	Vila Inhomirim	
Nilópolis station	Nilópolis	Japeri	
Nova Iguaçu station	Nova Iguaçu	Japeri	
Olaria station	Olaria	Saracuruna	TransCarioca (integrated BRT/SuperVia station)
Olinda station	Nilópolis	Japeri	
Oswaldo Cruz station	Oswaldo Cruz	Deodoro	
Paciência station	Paciência	Santa Cruz	
Padre Miguel station	Padre Miguel	Santa Cruz	
Palmeiras station	Complexo do Alemão	Teleférico A	
Paracambi station	Paracambi	Paracambi	
Parada Angélica station	Duque de Caxias	Vila Inhomirim	
Parada Bananal station	Guapimirim	Guapimirim	
Parada de Lucas station	Parada de Lucas	Saracuruna	
Parada Ideal station	Guapimirim	Guapimirim	
Parada Modelo station	Guapimirim	Guapimirim	
Parque Estrela station	Magé	Guapimirim	
Penha Circular station	Penha Circular	Saracuruna	
Penha station	Penha	Saracuruna	
Piabetá station	Piabetá	Vila Inhomirim	
Piedade station	Piedade	Deodoro	
Pilares station	Pilares	Belford Roxo	
Praça da Bandeira station	Praça da Bandeira	Deodoro	
Presidente Juscelino station	Centro	Japeri	
Queimados station	Queimados	Japeri	
Quintino station	Quintino Bocaiuva	Deodoro	
Ramos station	Ramos	Saracuruna	
Realengo station	Realengo	Santa Cruz	
Riachuelo station	Riachuelo	Deodoro	
Ricardo de Albuquerque station	Ricardo de Albuquerque	Japeri	
Rocha Miranda station	Rocha Miranda	Belford Roxo	
S.J de Meriti / Pavuna station	Pavuna	Belford Roxo	Line 2 - Pavuna station (integrated Metro/SuperVia station)
Sampaio station	Sampaio	Deodoro	
Santa Cruz station	Santa Cruz	Santa Cruz	TransOeste (integrated BRT/SuperVia station)
Santíssimo station	Santíssimo	Santa Cruz	
São Cristóvão station	Maracanã	Deodoro; Santa Cruz; Japeri; Belford Roxo; Saracuruna	Line 2 (integrated Metro/SuperVia station)
São Francisco Xavier station	São Francisco Xavier	Deodoro; Santa Cruz	Line 1 (integrated Metro/SuperVia station)
Saracuruna station	Duque de Caxias	Saracuruna; Vila Inhomirim; Guapimirim	
Senador Camará station	Senador Camará	Santa Cruz	
Silva Freire station	Méier	Santa Cruz; Japeri	
Suruí station	Magé	Guapimirim	
Tancredo Neves station	Paciência	Santa Cruz	
Tomás Coelho station	Tomás Coelho	Belford Roxo	
Triagem station	Rocha	Belford Roxo; Saracuruna	Line 2 (integrated Metro/SuperVia station)
Vigário Geral station	Vigário Geral	Saracuruna	
Vila Inhomirim station	Magé	Vila Inhomirim	
Vila Militar station	Vila Militar	Santa Cruz	
Vila Rosali station	São João de Meriti	Belford Roxo	

== Current system map ==

Line	Colour
Deodoro	
Santa Cruz	
Japeri	
Belford Roxo	
Saracuruna	
Paracambi	
Vila Inhomirim	
Guapimirim	
Teleférico A	
