= Santa Cruz Line =

Commuter rail line

- Diagram of the line

Overview
- Native name: Linha Santa Cruz
- Status: Operational
- Owner: Government of the State of Rio de Janeiro
- Locale: Greater Rio de Janeiro
- Termini: Central do Brasil; Santa Cruz
- Stations: 34

Service
- Type: Commuter rail
- System: SuperVia
- Operator(s): SuperVia
- Rolling stock: 95 Hitachi/Nippon Sharyo Series 500 (23 trains); 100 Mafersa/Hitachi Series 700 (25 trains); 104 Francorail/Cobrasma/MTE/BBC/Traction Cem Oerlikon/Jeumont-Schneider Series 900 (26 trains); 80 Hyundai Rotem Series 2005 (20 trains); 400 CNR Series 3000 (100 trains); 160 Alstom Series 4000 (20 trains)

Technical
- Line length: 55 km (34 mi)
- Character: At-grade
- Track gauge: 1,600 mm (5 ft 3 in)
- Electrification: 3,000 V DC catenary
- Operating speed: 90 km/h (56 mph)

Santa Cruz Line is a commuter rail line operated by SuperVia. It is a shortening of the old Mangaratiba Branch of Central do Brasil Railway, as this line continued towards the extinct Mangaratiba station, in the homonymous city, located in the coastal region of Costa Verde.

== History ==
The line begins at Central do Brasil station, crossing many dense areas until Deodoro, in the entrance of West Side of the city, from which it crosses many West Side neighbourhoods, until Santa Cruz station.

The stretch between Deodoro and Realengo attends the large military complex located in the region. After that, the line attends peripheral regions with high index of demographic density and low level of Human Development Index (HDI) and crossing important poles of the region, such as Bangu and Campo Grande. It is a line that does not operate intercity services, different from other SuperVia branches that head towards other municipalities of Baixada Fluminense, or to the municipality of Paracambi in the region of the Coffee Valley.

It connects the city's downtown to the extreme West Side of the capital, 54 kilometres (34 mi) away, in an average speed of 40 km/h (25 mph).

It has integration with bus lines from the city in Méier, Cascadura, Madureira, Marechal Hermes and Deodoro stations, exclusively using RioCard. From Central do Brasil towards Deodoro, there are bus lines with integration to Catumbi and Rio Comprido neighbourhoods.

There are integration services with bus lines using exclusively the RioCard in most of the stations. This interchange resulted in an enhancement in the quality of transportation in many West Side neighbourhoods, before limited to the option of buses in Avenida Brasil, which in peak hours can represent an economy of more than 1 hour in journey time.

This line was a large potential of expansion, because it's a region that still has large population growth, being that its main demands of transport to Baixada Fluminense, North Side and Center are well attended by the metropolitan.

The line was integrated with Deodoro Line in June 2020, operating only as a local line service. This decision was taken by SuperVia to reduce trains stops caused by signalling of Deodoro, Santa Cruz and Japeri lines.

== Specifications ==
Santa Cruz Line is electrified with overhead lines of 3,000 Volts, and a variant rolling stock based in many of the old and new trains.

=== Stations ===
Code	Station	Neighbourhood	Connections
CBL	Central do Brasil	Centro	Japeri Belford Roxo Saracuruna; 1 2; 2 3 Teleférico da Providência; Américo Fontenelle Road Terminal
PBA	Praça da Bandeira	Praça da Bandeira	−
SCO	São Cristóvão	São Cristóvão	Japeri Belford Roxo Saracuruna; 1 2
MNA	Maracanã	Maracanã	Japeri Belford Roxo Saracuruna; 1 2
SFX	São Francisco Xavier	São Francisco Xavier	−
RCO	Riachuelo	Riachuelo	−
SPO	Sampaio	Sampaio	−
ENO	Engenho Novo	Engenho Novo	−
MER	Méier	Méier	−
EDO	Olímpica de Engenho de Dentro	Engenho de Dentro	Japeri
PIE	Piedade	Piedade	−
QTO	Quintino	Quintino Bocaiuva	−
CDA	Cascadura	Cascadura	−
MRA	Madureira	Madureira	Japeri; TransCarioca
OCZ	Oswaldo Cruz	Oswaldo Cruz	−
BRO	Prefeito Bento Ribeiro	Bento Ribeiro	−
MHS	Marechal Hermes	Marechal Hermes	−
DEO	Deodoro	Deodoro	Japeri
VMR	Vila Militar	Vila Militar	TransOlímpica
MGA	Magalhães Bastos	Magalhães Bastos	TransOlímpica
REA	Realengo	Realengo	−
PML	Mocidade/Padre Miguel	Padre Miguel	−
GSA	Guilherme da Silveira	Bangu	−
BGU	Bangu	Bangu	−
SEN	Senador Camará	Senador Camará	−
STO	Santíssimo	Santíssimo	−
AVS	Augusto Vasconcelos	Senador Vasconcelos	−
CGE	Campo Grande	Campo Grande	−
BME	Benjamin do Monte	Inhoaíba	−
IBA	Inhoaíba	Inhoaíba	−
COS	Cosmos	Cosmos	−
PAC	Paciência	Paciência	−
TNS	Tancredo Neves	Paciência	−
SCZ	Santa Cruz	Santa Cruz	TransOeste

== See also ==
- SuperVia
