= Deodoro Line =

Commuter rail line in Rio de Janeiro, Brazil

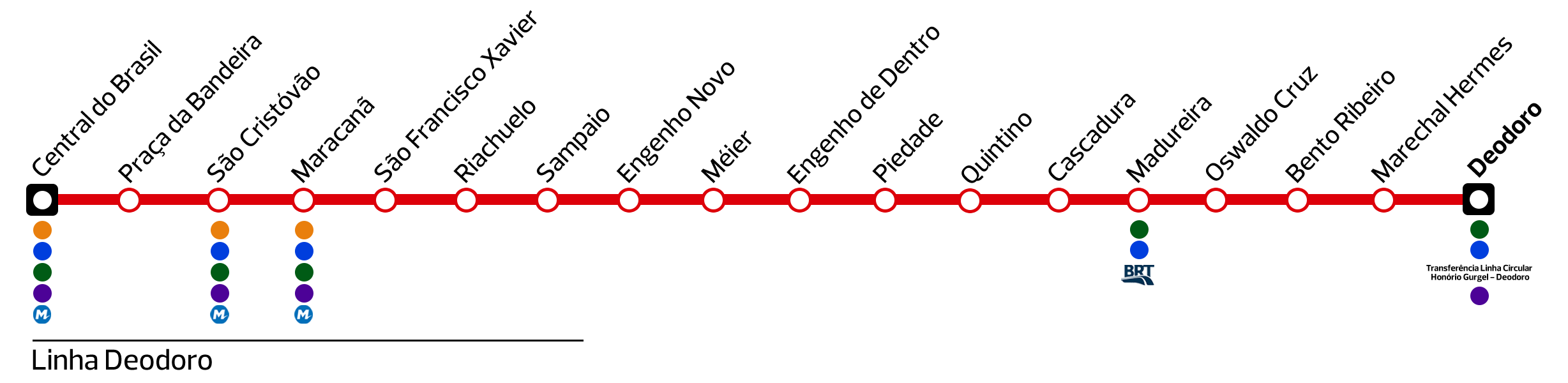
- Diagram of the line

Overview
- Status: Operational; Interconnected with the Santa Cruz Line
- Owner: Government of the State of Rio de Janeiro
- Locale: Rio de Janeiro, Brazil
- Termini: Central do Brasil; Deodoro
- Stations: 19

Service
- Type: Commuter rail
- System: Rio de Janeiro Metropolitan Trains
- Services: Central do Brasil ↔ Deodoro (Local) Central do Brasil ↔ Deodoro (Express)
- Operator(s): SuperVia
- Rolling stock: 80 Hyundai Rotem Series 2005 (20 trains); 400 CNR Series 3000 (100 trains); 160 Alstom Series 4000 (20 trains); 48 Alstom Series 5000 (6 trains)

Technical
- Line length: 23 km (14 mi)
- Character: At-grade
- Track gauge: 1,600 mm (5 ft 3 in)
- Electrification: 3,000 V DC catenary
- Operating speed: 90 km/h (56 mph)

The Deodoro Line is a commuter rail line operated by SuperVia as part of the Rio de Janeiro Metropolitan Trains system. It runs from Deodoro, in the West Zone of Rio de Janeiro, through the North Zone to Central do Brasil Station, in Rio de Janeiro Downtown. The route and stations are shared with the Santa Cruz and Japeri Lines. It's the busiest line in the system. Since June 2020, it has been interconnected with the Santa Cruz Line.

Printed in red, it serves 19 stations, many of which are in historical and important locations. Like the other commuter rail lines, the line's name comes from its first station and terminus, Deodoro. The Deodoro line was part of the Central Line of the Central do Brasil Railway.

== History ==
This line crosses many important neighbourhoods of the North Side, such as Praça da Bandeira, São Cristóvão, Maracanã, Méier, Engenho de Dentro, Piedade, Cascadura, Madureira, Oswaldo Cruz, Rio de Janeiro, Bento Ribeiro and Marechal Hermes.

Popularly known as parador (local service), it has a journey time of 40 minutes.

Some of its main stations, such as Méier and Madureira, had escalators installed and others, such as Cascadura, Piedade and Quintino, were restored.

In 2006, after more than two decades without acquisition of new rolling stock, new Series 2005 compositions from South Korea began operating, in a total of 20 new trains which began operation in mid-2007 for the 2007 Pan American Games. This line connects Nilton Santos Olympic Stadium, in Engenho de Dentro, to Maracanã Stadium, two of the main centers of the event. In 2012, 30 new Series 3000 compositions from Changchun, China began operating.

It has integration with bus lines from the city in Méier, Cascadura, Madureira, Marechal Hermes and Deodoro stations, exclusively using the RioCard. From Central do Brasil towards Deodoro, there are bus lines with integration to Catumbi and Rio Comprido neighbourhoods.

During peak hours, the headway on the Deodoro Line was 6−8 minutes. For interchange stations, where there are also express services, the headway was only 3 minutes.

The line was integrated with the Santa Cruz Line in June 2020, becoming part of the line. This decision was taken by SuperVia to reduce delays caused by the signalling of the Deodoro, Santa Cruz and Japeri lines. Deodoro Line services resumed in 2024.

== Specifications ==
The Deodoro Line is electrified through overhead lines of 3,000 Volts, and has a rolling stock composed of Hyundai Rotem Series 2005 and CNR Series 3000.

== Services ==
- Deodoro ↔ Central do Brasil (Local);
- Deodoro ↔ Central do Brasil (Express): This service makes stops just at these stations: Deodoro, Madureira, Olímpica de Engenho de Dentro, Maracanã, São Cristóvão and Central do Brasil.

== List of Stations ==
Code	Station	Location	Connections	Notes
CBL	Central do Brasil	Centro	Santa Cruz Japeri Belford Roxo Saracuruna; 1 2; 2 3 Providência Cable Car; Américo Fontenelle Bus Terminal	Terminus
PBA	Praça da Bandeira	Praça da Bandeira	−	
SCO	São Cristóvão	São Cristóvão	Santa Cruz Japeri Belford Roxo Saracuruna; 1 2	Express service stop
MNA	Maracanã	Maracanã	Santa Cruz Japeri Belford Roxo Saracuruna; 1 2	Express service stop
MGA	Mangueira/Jamelão	Mangueira	−	Closed in 2014; Now used as an exit for Maracanã station
SFX	São Francisco Xavier	São Francisco Xavier	−	
-	Rocha	Rocha	−	Closed in 1971
RCO	Riachuelo	Riachuelo	−	
SPO	Sampaio	Sampaio	−	
ENO	Engenho Novo	Engenho Novo	−	
MER	Méier	Méier	−	
-	Todos os Santos	Todos os Santos	−	Closed in 1971
EDO	Olímpica de Engenho de Dentro	Engenho de Dentro	Santa Cruz Japeri	Express service stop
-	Encantado	Encantado	−	Closed in 1997
PIE	Piedade	Piedade	−	
QTO	Quintino	Quintino Bocaiuva	−	
CDA	Cascadura	Cascadura	−	
MRA	Madureira	Madureira	Santa Cruz Japeri; TransCarioca Paulo da Portela Bus Terminal	Express service stop
OCZ	Oswaldo Cruz	Oswaldo Cruz	−	
BRO	Prefeito Bento Ribeiro	Bento Ribeiro	−	
MHS	Marechal Hermes	Marechal Hermes	−	
DEO	Deodoro	Deodoro	Santa Cruz Japeri TransBrasil TransOlímpica Deodoro Bus Terminal	Terminus
Closed station

== See also ==
- SuperVia
- Santa Cruz line
- Japeri line
