= Mangueira station =

Metro station in Rio de Janeiro, Brazil

Mangueira Estação Mangueira
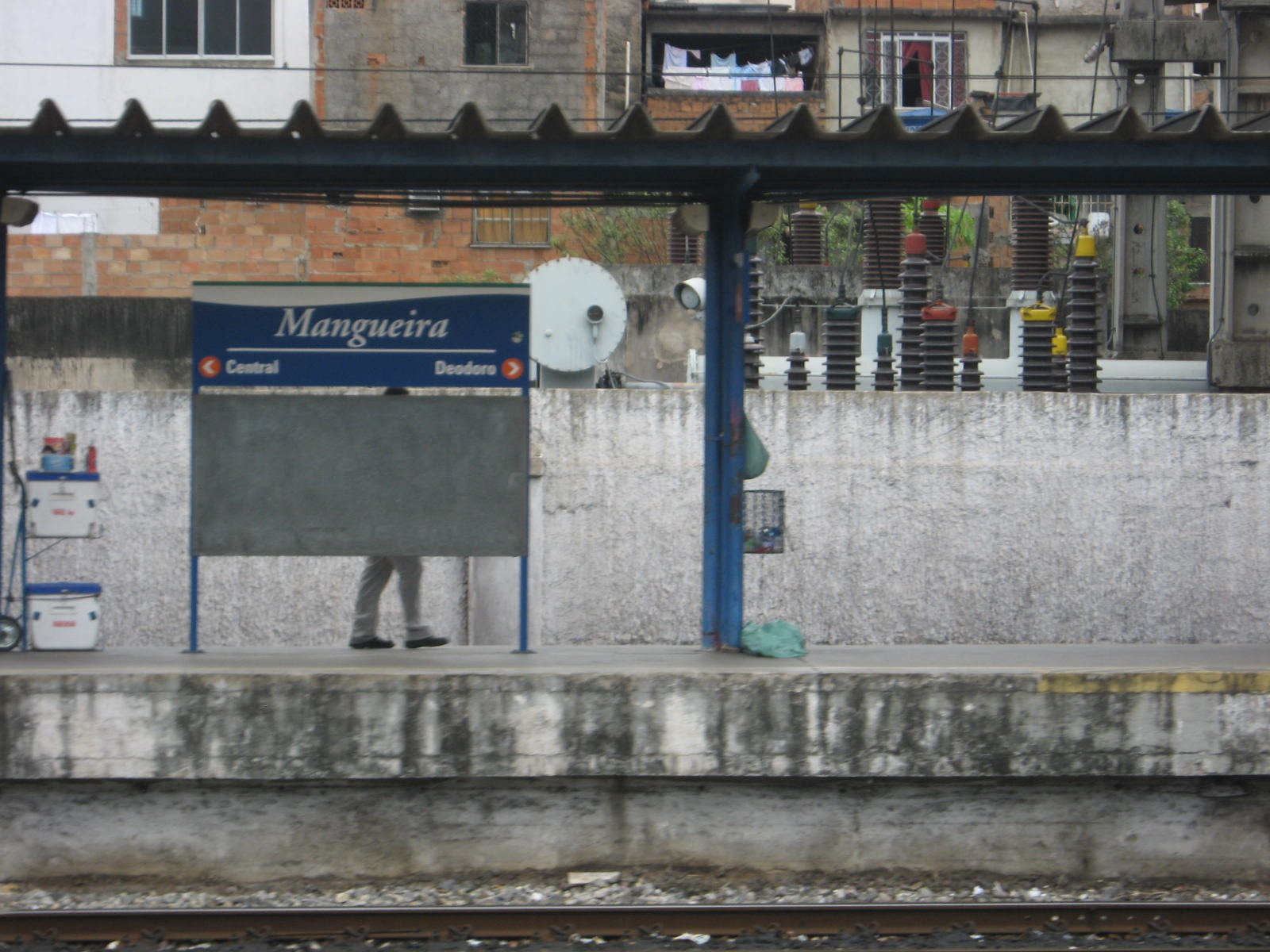
- Mangueira station in 2010

General information
- Location: Rio de Janeiro; Brazil
- Coordinates: 22.9085389°S 43.2366972°W
- Owner: Rio de Janeiro State Government
- Operator: SuperVia
- Line: Deodoro Line
- Platforms: 1 island platform
- Tracks: 2

Other information
- Station code: MGA

History
- Opened: 1869
- Rebuilt: 2000
- Electrified: 1937

Services
Preceding station	SuperVia	Following station
Maracanã towards Central	Deodoro	São Francisco Xavier towards Deodoro
Location
- Location within Rio de Janeiro

Mangueira is a railway station in Mangueira, Rio de Janeiro, which is serviced by the Supervia.

== History ==
Namesake of the Mangueira Samba School, and previously part of the Central do Brasil Railroad, Mangueira station now is the fourth station after Central do Brasil station on the suburban Deodoro Line, after Praça da Bandeira, São Cristóvão and Maracanã. The station was named Mangueira when it was opened in 1869 due to a local hat factory known as the Fábrica das Mangueiras, or Mango Tree Factory, due to the large amount of mangoes that were grown there. In 1937, the line was electrified, with a substation being built next to the station. Due to being too close to the rebuilt Maracanã station, Mangueira station was closed in August 2014. However, following the construction of a 77-metre-long (253 ft) passageway to Platform 1 of Maracanã station on 22 February 2016, Mangueira was reopened to passengers.

== Platforms ==
Platform 1A: Towards Deodoro (Stopper)
Platform 1B: Towards Central do Brasil (Stopper)
