= Maracanã station =

Metro station in Rio de Janeiro, Brazil

Maracanã
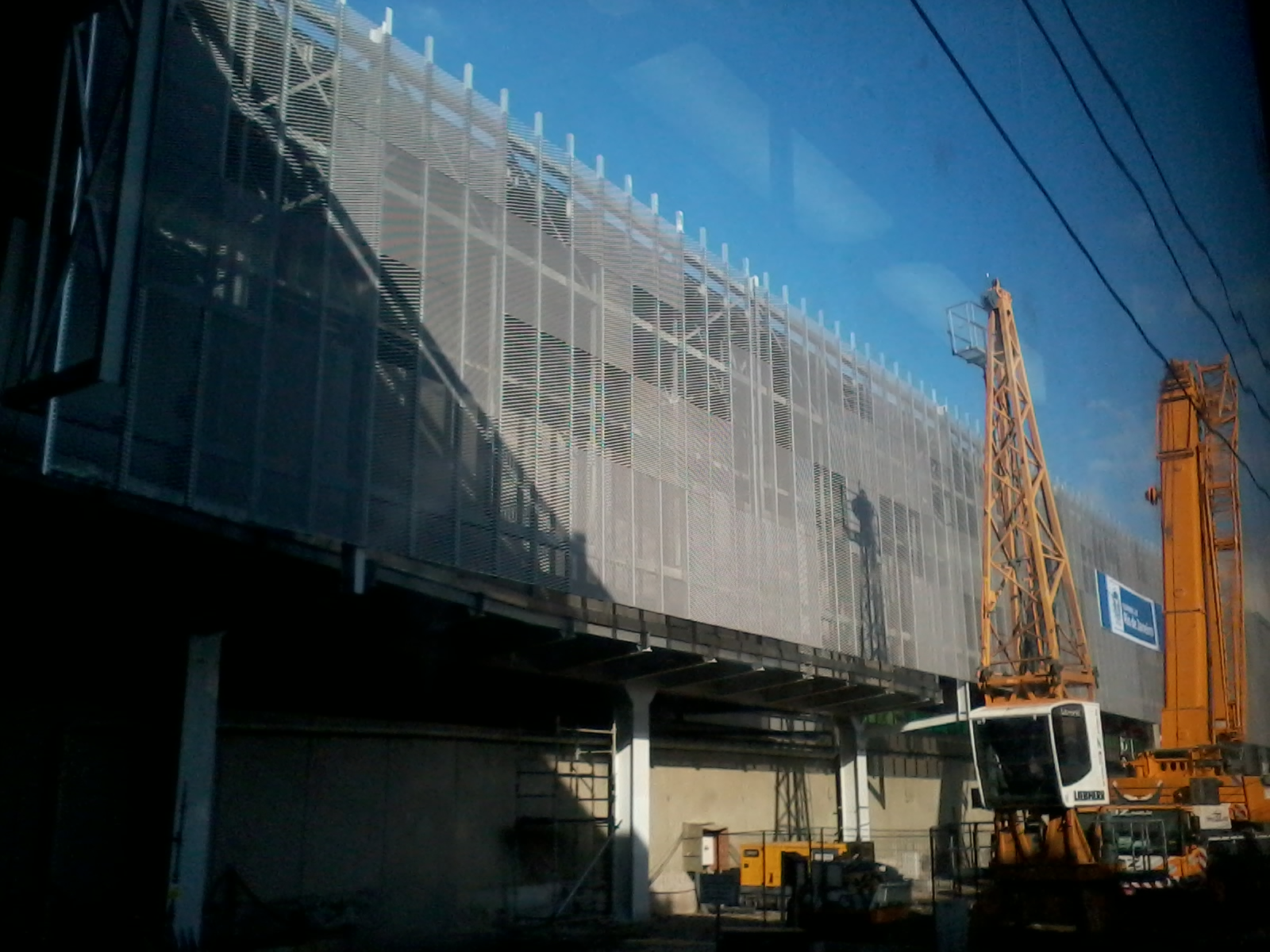
- Maracanã metro station under construction

General information
- Location: Rio de Janeiro; Brazil
- Coordinates: 22.909769°S 43.233922°W
- Lines: SuperVia; Deodoro Line; Santa Cruz Line; Japeri Line; Belford Roxo Line; Saracuruna Line; Metrô Rio; Line 2

Services
Preceding station	Rio de Janeiro Metro	Following station
Triagem towards Pavuna	Line 2	São Cristóvão towards Botafogo
Preceding station	SuperVia	Following station
São Cristóvão towards Central	Deodoro	Mangueira towards Deodoro
São Cristóvão towards Central	Santa Cruz	São Francisco Xavier towards Santa Cruz
São Cristóvão towards Central	Japeri	Silva Freire towards Japeri
São Cristóvão towards Central	Belford Roxo	Triagem towards Belford Roxo
São Cristóvão towards Central	Saracuruna	Triagem towards Saracuruna
Location
- Location within Rio de Janeiro

Maracanã Station (Portuguese: Estação Maracanã), formerly known as Derby Club Station (Portuguese: Estação Derby Club), is a railway station in Maracanã, Rio de Janeiro which services the Maracanã Stadium. The station was inaugurated in July, 2014, and is serviced by the Rio de Janeiro Metro and SuperVia.
