= São Cristóvão station =

Metro station in Rio de Janeiro, Brazil

São Cristóvão Estação São Cristóvão
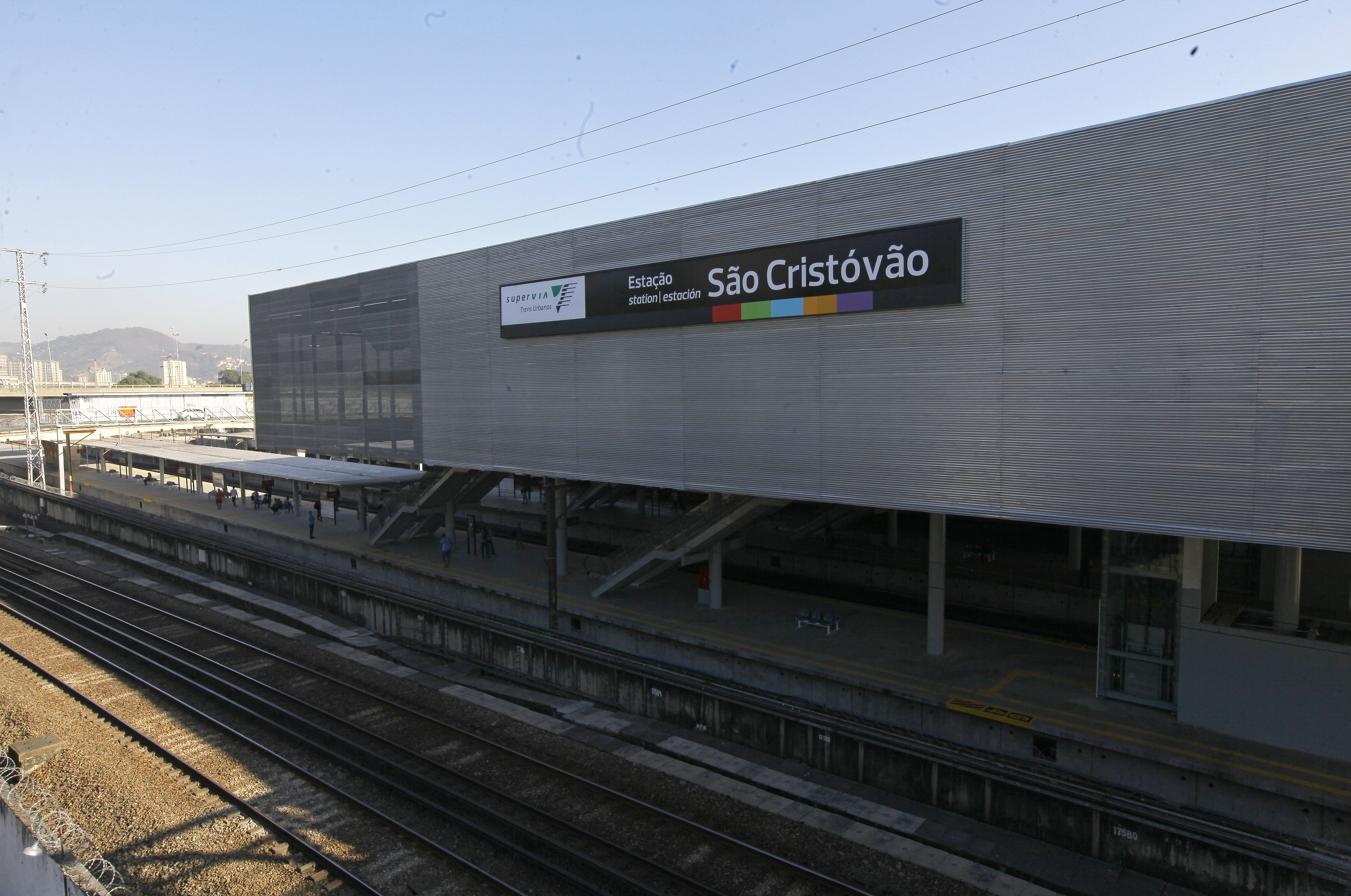
- São Cristóvão Supervia station

General information
- Location: Rio de Janeiro; Brazil
- Coordinates: 22.9101004°S 43.2229996°W
- Elevation: 4 m (13 ft)
- Owner: Rio de Janeiro State Government
- Operator: SuperVia
- Lines: Deodoro Line; Santa Cruz Line; Japeri Line; Belford Roxo Line; Saracuruna Line
- Platforms: 3 island platforms
- Tracks: 6

Construction
- Cycle facilities: Yes

Other information
- Station code: SCO

History
- Opened: 1859; 167 years ago
- Rebuilt: 1937; 89 years ago 2016; 10 years ago
- Electrified: 1937; 89 years ago

Services
| Preceding station | SuperVia | Following station |
|---|---|---|
| Praça da Bandeira towards Central | Deodoro | Maracanã towards Deodoro |
| Central Terminus | Santa Cruz | Maracanã towards Santa Cruz |
| Central Terminus | Japeri | Maracanã towards Japeri |
| Central Terminus | Belford Roxo | Maracanã towards Belford Roxo |
| Central Terminus | Saracuruna | Maracanã towards Saracuruna |
Location
- Location within Rio de Janeiro

São Cristóvão Estação São Cristóvão
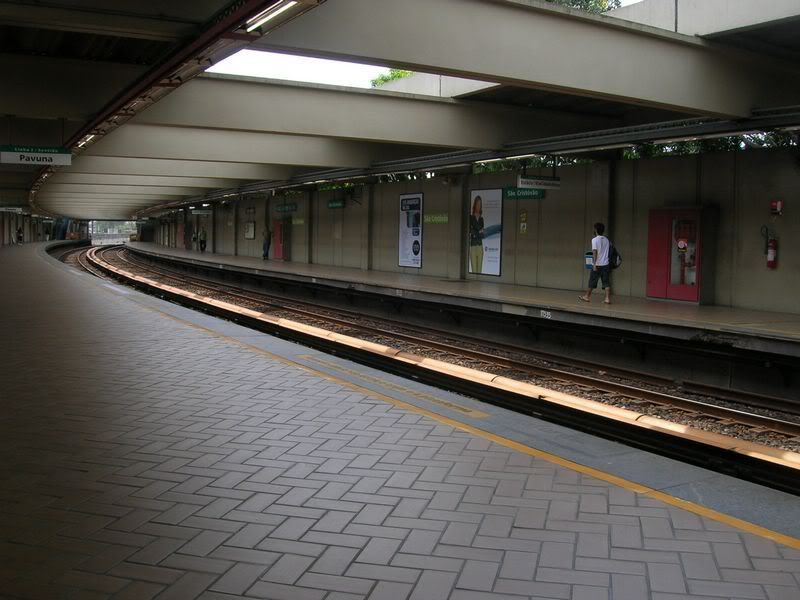
- São Cristóvão metro station

General information
- Location: Rio de Janeiro; Brazil
- Coordinates: 22.9097222°S 43.2211111°W
- Owner: Rio de Janeiro State Government
- Operator: Metrô Rio
- Line: Line 2
- Platforms: 2 side platforms
- Tracks: 2

Other information
- Station code: SCR

History
- Opened: 1981

Passengers
- 2017: 4.052 million

Services
| Preceding station | Rio de Janeiro Metro | Following station |
|---|---|---|
| Maracanã towards Pavuna | Line 2 | Cidade Nova towards Botafogo |
| Maracanã towards Pavuna | Line 2 | Estácio Maintenance only Terminus |
Location
- Location within Rio de Janeiro

São Cristóvão Station (Portuguese: Estação São Cristóvão) is a railway station in São Cristóvão, Rio de Janeiro which is serviced by the Rio de Janeiro Metro and SuperVia.

== Supervia station ==
=== History ===
São Cristóvão Station was opened on 16 July 1859, being part of the first section of the Central do Brasil Railroad, between Rio de Janeiro and Nova Iguaçu. With the growth of the city of Rio de Janeiro, passenger trains started to run with ever increasing frequency, and suburban trains started running in the 1920s. During the electrification works of the Central do Brasil railroad (1934–1937), São Cristóvão Station was reconstructed, with a mezzanine over the tracks.

With the expansion of services on the railroad between 1963 and 1972, new platforms were built, and the mezzanine over the station was expanded. Despite this, the station could not keep up with the number of passengers. On 12 October 1974, during the Children's Day festivities in the Quinta da Boa Vista, severe overcrowding inside the station caused 4 deaths and hundreds of injuries.

With the construction of São Cristóvão Metro Station between 1976 and 1981, plans were made to remodel and integrate the suburban rail station to the metro, though they never left the drawing board. In 1984, São Cristóvão Station was transferred from the Federal Railroad Network to the Brazilian Urban Train Company (CBTU), which made new plans to remodel the station, but those plans also never left the drawing board due to a lack of funds.

After the privatization of urban trains in Greater Rio de Janeiro and of the station in 1998, a new plan for the station was presented in 2000 through a national architecture competition. Despite the winning entry being created by Mario Biselli and José Paulo de Bem (who designed Sé Station in São Paulo), the plan was never acted on due to a lack of funds. Only in the 2010s would Supervia and the Rio de Janeiro State government start a new reconstruction project. Financed by the Brazilian Development Bank, the plan was commissioned with the aid of private companies including Planorcon, LZD Arquitetos and RVBA Arquitetos, but the reconstruction itself would be done by EBTE Engenharia, and was completed on 27 July 2016.

=== Platforms ===
| Southbound local | ← Deodoro Line towards Central do Brasil (Praça da Bandeira) (weekday mornings and early afternoons) ← Santa Cruz Line towards Central do Brasil (Praça da Bandeira) (weekends and weekday afternoons and evenings) ← Japeri Line towards Central do Brasil (Praça da Bandeira) (weekends and weekday afternoons and evenings) |
Island platform
| Northbound local | Deodoro Line towards Deodoro (Maracanã) (weekdays, except nights) → Santa Cruz Line towards Santa Cruz (Maracanã) (weekends and weekday early mornings and nights) → Japeri Line towards Japeri (Maracanã) (weekends and weekday early mornings and late nights) → |
| Southbound express | ← Santa Cruz Line towards Central do Brasil (Central do Brasil) (weekday mornings and early afternoons) ← Japeri Line towards Central do Brasil (Central do Brasil) (weekday mornings and early afternoons) |
Island platform
| Northbound express | Santa Cruz Line towards Santa Cruz (Maracanã) (weekdays, except early mornings and nights) → Japeri Line towards Japeri (Maracanã) (weekdays, except mornings and late nights) → |
| Southbound | ← Belford Roxo Line towards Central do Brasil (Central do Brasil) ← Saracuruna Line towards Central do Brasil (Central do Brasil) |
Island platform
| Northbound | Belford Roxo Line towards Belford Roxo (Maracanã) → Saracuruna Line towards Gramacho (weekdays) or Saracuruna (weekends) (Maracanã) → |

== Metro Station ==
=== History ===
The first plans for São Cristóvão Metro Station were presented (along with the plans for Triagem, Maracanã and Maria da Graça Metro Stations) in June 1976 by Projeto Arquitetos Associados Ltda. (PAAL), a private company owned by Sabino Machado Barroso, Jaime Zettel and José de Anchieta Leal, and said plans called for a direct integration to the existing train station.

The construction of São Cristóvão Metro Station was contracted out by the Rio de Janeiro state government to Cetenco Engenharia S.A. and Ecisa - Engenharia, Comercio e Industria S/A for the value of 510 million cruzeiros and started on 16 March 1977. Despite the initial deadline of 600 days after the start of construction, São Cristóvão Metro Station was only inaugurated on 19 November 1981.

=== Entrances ===
The station had three entrances in the past: Radial Oeste and RFFSA in the northern end and Senador Furtado in the southern end, but now it has four entrances: Praça da Bandeira, Radial Oeste Avenue, Maracanã Station and the Quinta da Boa Vista.
