= Méier station =

Metro station in Rio de Janeiro, Brazil

Méier Estação Méier
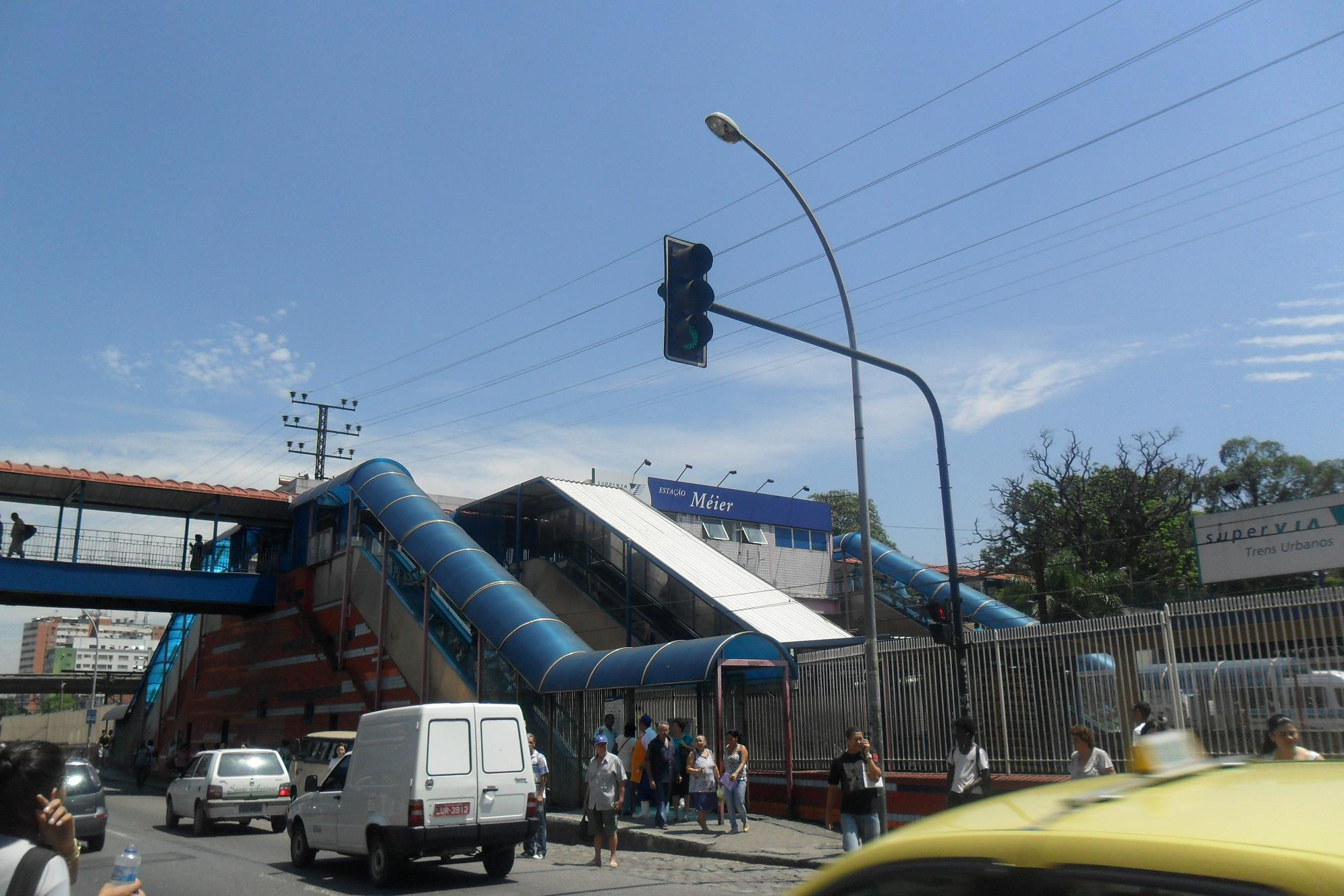
- Méier station in 2013

General information
- Location: Rio de Janeiro; Brazil
- Coordinates: 22.9017917°S 43.2780583°W
- Owner: Rio de Janeiro State Government
- Operator: SuperVia
- Line: Deodoro Line
- Platforms: 1 island platform
- Tracks: 2

Other information
- Station code: MER

History
- Opened: 1889
- Rebuilt: 2006
- Electrified: 1937

Services
Preceding station	SuperVia	Following station
Engenho Novo towards Central	Deodoro	Olímpica de Engenho de Dentro towards Deodoro
Location
- Location within Rio de Janeiro

Méier is a railway station in Méier, Rio de Janeiro which is serviced by the Supervia.

== History ==
Méier Station was opened in 1889, being part of the first section of the Central do Brasil Railroad, between Rio de Janeiro and Nova Iguaçu. During the turn of the century, the station had streetcars running to Inhaúma, though these have since been abandoned in favour of buses. With the growth of the city of Rio de Janeiro - In large part caused by the existence of the train line - passenger trains started to run with ever increasing frequency, and the line would be electrified in 1937. Méier Station would also get new entrances during these electrification works, which meant that passengers no longer had to walk on the tracks to access the station. The station was rebuilt in 2006 by the Rio de Janeiro State government working in partnership with the International Bank for Reconstruction and Development, getting new ramps to increase accessibility.

== Notable places nearby ==
- João Nogueira Cultural Centre
- Lower Méier

== Platforms ==
Platform 1A: Towards Deodoro (Stopper)
Platform 1B: Towards Central do Brasil (Stopper)
