= Engenho Novo station =

Railway station in Rio de Janeiro, Brazil

Engenho Novo Estação Engenho Novo
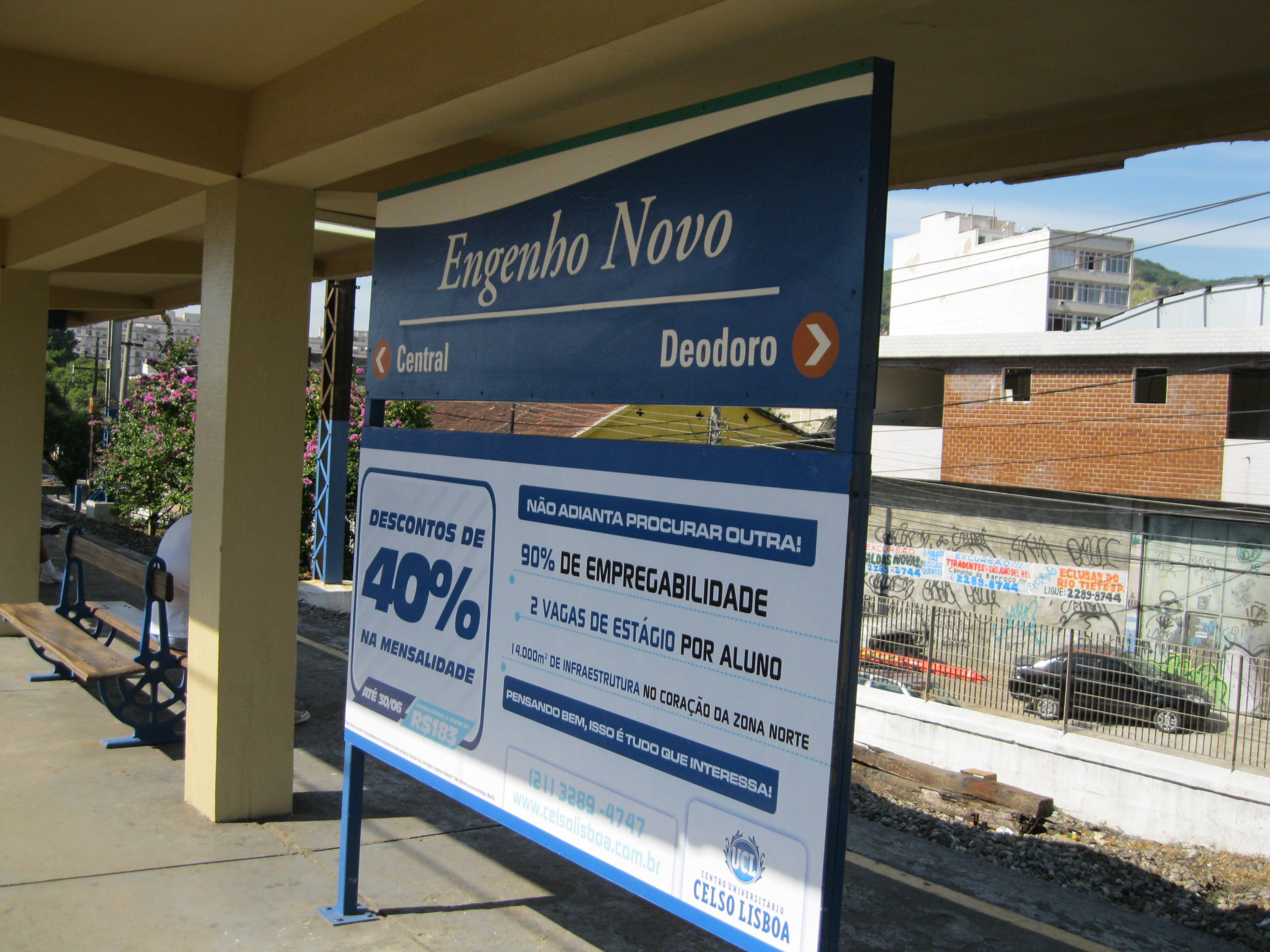
- Engenho Novo station in 2011

General information
- Location: Rio de Janeiro; Brazil
- Coordinates: 22.9033333°S 43.270525°W
- Owner: Rio de Janeiro State Government
- Operator: SuperVia
- Line: Deodoro Line
- Platforms: 1 island platform
- Tracks: 2

Other information
- Station code: ENO

History
- Opened: 1858
- Electrified: 1937

Services
Preceding station	SuperVia	Following station
Sampaio towards Central	Deodoro	Méier towards Deodoro
Location
- Location within Rio de Janeiro

Engenho Novo is a railway station in Engenho Novo, Rio de Janeiro which is serviced by the Supervia.

== History ==
Engenho Novo Station was opened in 1858, being part of the first section of the Central do Brasil Railroad, between Rio de Janeiro and Nova Iguaçu. With the growth of the city of Rio de Janeiro - In large part caused by the existence of the train line - passenger trains started to run with ever increasing frequency, and the line would be electrified in 1937. The station was rebuilt in the 1900s, and had streetcars running from there to Vila Isabel, though these streetcars have since been abandoned. The subterranean passage between one side of the tracks and the other would be built in 1920. Though the station was originally used for both cargo and passenger transport, the inauguration of Silva Freire station caused it to be used exclusively for passenger transport, and the Deodoro Line as a whole is now used exclusively for passenger transport.

== Notable places nearby ==
- Pedro II School

== Platforms ==
Platform 1A: Towards Deodoro (Stopper)
Platform 1B: Towards Central do Brasil (Stopper)
