= Riachuelo station =

Metro station in Rio de Janeiro, Brazil

Riachuelo Estação Riachuelo
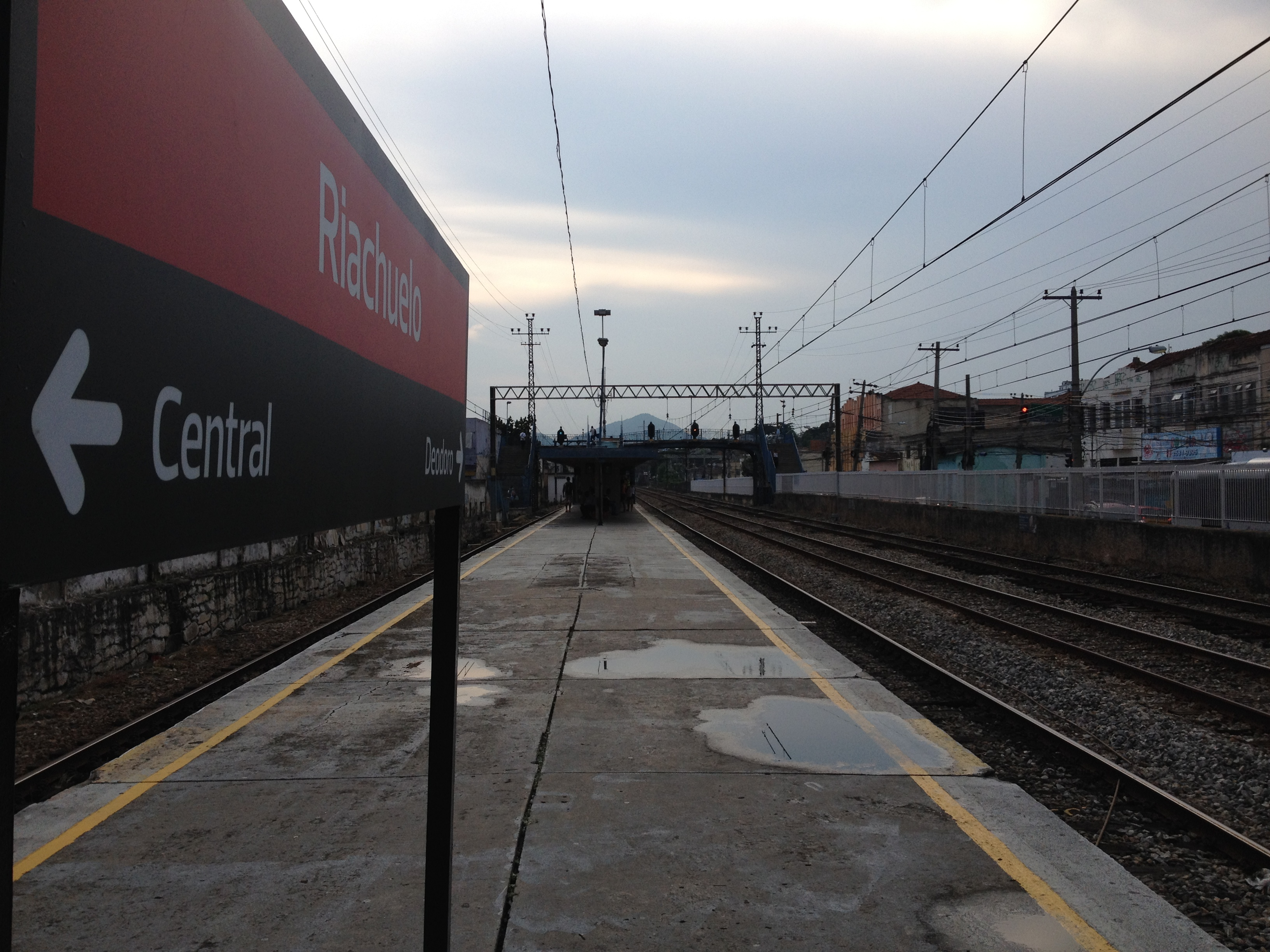
- Riachuelo station in April 2016

General information
- Location: Rio de Janeiro; Brazil
- Coordinates: 22.9015028°S 43.2562361°W
- Owner: Rio de Janeiro State Government
- Operator: SuperVia
- Line: Deodoro Line
- Platforms: 1 island platform
- Tracks: 2

Other information
- Station code: RCO

History
- Opened: 1869
- Electrified: 1937

Services
Preceding station	SuperVia	Following station
São Francisco Xavier towards Central	Deodoro	Sampaio towards Deodoro
Location
- Location within Rio de Janeiro

Riachuelo, originally known as Riachuelo do Rio, is a railway station in Riachuelo, Rio de Janeiro which is serviced by the Supervia.

== History ==
Riachulo Station, then known as Riachuelo do Rio, was opened on 1 February 1869, being part of the first section of the Central do Brasil Railroad, between Rio de Janeiro and Nova Iguaçu. With the growth of the city of Rio de Janeiro - In large part caused by the existence of the train line - passenger trains started to run with ever increasing frequency, and the line would be electrified in 1937.

== Notable places nearby ==
- SENAI - CETIQT
- CCAA College (pt)

== Platforms ==
Platform 1A: Towards Deodoro (Stopper)
Platform 1B: Towards Central do Brasil (Stopper)
