= Prefeito Bento Ribeiro station =

Metro station in Rio de Janeiro, Brazil

Coordinates: 22.8643°S 43.3616°W

Prefeito Bento Ribeiro Station Estação Prefeito Bento Ribeiro
- Prefeito Bento Ribeiro Station in 2026 as seen from Imo Monteiro dos Santos Overpass, facing southeast

General information
- Location: Carolina Machado Street
- Lines: Deodoro Line; Santa Cruz Line
Location

Prefeito Bento Ribeiro Station (Portuguese: estação Prefeito Bento Ribeiro) is a railway station in Bento Ribeiro, Rio de Janeiro. It was inaugurated on 7 November 1914, in a ceremony attended by then–President of Brazil Hermes da Fonseca and then–Mayor of Rio de Janeiro Bento Ribeiro. It is located on Carolina Machado Street and serves the Deodoro and Santa Cruz lines.
