= Japeri Line =

Commuter rail line in Brazil

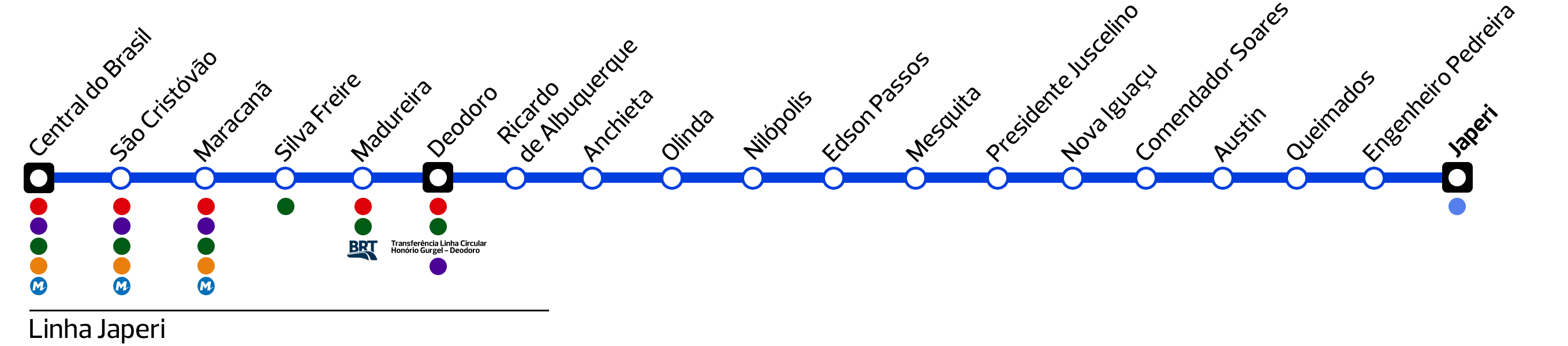
- Diagram of the line

Overview
- Native name: Linha Japeri
- Status: Operational
- Owner: Government of the State of Rio de Janeiro
- Locale: Greater Rio de Janeiro
- Termini: Central do Brasil; Japeri
- Stations: 20

Service
- Type: Commuter rail
- System: SuperVia
- Operator(s): SuperVia
- Rolling stock: 95 Hitachi/Nippon Sharyo Series 500 (23 trains); 100 Mafersa/Hitachi Series 700 (25 trains); 104 Francorail/Cobrasma/MTE/BBC/Traction Cem Oerlikon/Jeumont-Schneider Series 900 (26 trains); 80 Hyundai Rotem Series 2005 (20 trains); 400 CNR Series 3000 (100 trains); 160 Alstom Series 4000 (20 trains)

Technical
- Line length: 61 km (38 mi)
- Character: At-grade
- Track gauge: 1,600 mm (5 ft 3 in)
- Electrification: 3,000 V DC catenary
- Operating speed: 80 km/h (50 mph)

The Japeri Line is a commuter rail line operated by SuperVia.

== History ==
The line begins in Central do Brasil station and ends in Japeri station, where it's possible to transfer to trains of Paracambi Line.

Due to the lower train fare when compared to intermunicipal buses running similar routes, it is the line with the highest demand, especially in station which connect the Baixada Fluminense with the North Side, the West Side and the Center of the city of Rio de Janeiro. The demand is high between the first five stations of this line and Central do Brasil, representing a significant amount of trips in the system.

On weekdays before 9 PM, all of the Japeri Line trains circulate between Central do Brasil and Deodoro station as express. There are daily departures between Central do Brasil and Nova Iguaçu station during peak hours, so as to offer more comfort in critical hours.

The average headway during peak hours is 10 minutes.

The route is the longest of all SuperVia lines and the one with the longest acceleration time of the trains between Engenheiro Pedreira and Japeri, with 5 to 7 minutes of acceleration, and reaching speeds above 80 km/h (50 mph).

The Dom Pedro II-Japeri line is the initial branch of the defunct Center Line of Central do Brasil Railway. The stretch between Japeri and Monte Azul, Minas Gerais is currently operated only for cargo trains.

As of March 2024, this line operates with the following pattern:

Towards Japeri: 4:20 A.M.- 9 A.M: Local 9 A.M. - 8:43 PM: Express, making an additional stop at Silva Freire station between 10 A.M. and 3 P.M. 9 P.M. - 11 P.M.: Local On the evening peak some trains terminate at Nova Iguaçu station. These trains run express.

Towards Central: 3:48 A.M.- 2:12 P.M.: Express, making an adittional stop at Silva Freire station between 10 A.M. and 3 P.M. 2:12 P.M. - 10:22 P.M.: Local On the morning peak, there are extra trains that depart from Nova Iguaçu station. These trains run express.

== Stations ==
Code	Station	Municipality	Connections
CBL	Central do Brasil	Rio de Janeiro	Santa Cruz Belford Roxo Saracuruna; 1 2; 2 3 Teleférico da Providência; Américo Fontenelle Bus Terminal
SCO	São Cristóvão	Rio de Janeiro	Santa Cruz Belford Roxo Saracuruna; 1 2
MNA	Maracanã	Rio de Janeiro	Santa Cruz Belford Roxo Saracuruna; 1 2
SFE	Silva Freire	Rio de Janeiro	−
EDO	Olímpica de Engenho de Dentro	Rio de Janeiro	Santa Cruz
MRA	Madureira	Rio de Janeiro	Santa Cruz; TransCarioca
DEO	Deodoro	Rio de Janeiro	Santa Cruz
N/A	Ricardo de Albuquerque	Rio de Janeiro	−
N/A	Anchieta	Rio de Janeiro	−
N/A	Olinda	Nilópolis	−
N/A	Nilópolis	Nilópolis	−
N/A	Édson Passos	Mesquita	−
N/A	Mesquita	Mesquita	−
N/A	Presidente Juscelino	Mesquita	−
N/A	Nova Iguaçu	Nova Iguaçu	−
N/A	Comendador Soares	Nova Iguaçu	−
N/A	Austin	Nova Iguaçu	−
N/A	Queimados	Queimados	−
N/A	Engenheiro Pedreira	Japeri	−
N/A	Japeri	Japeri	Paracambi

== See also ==
- SuperVia
