= São Francisco Xavier station =

Metro station in Rio de Janeiro, Brazil

São Francisco Xavier Estação São Francisco Xavier
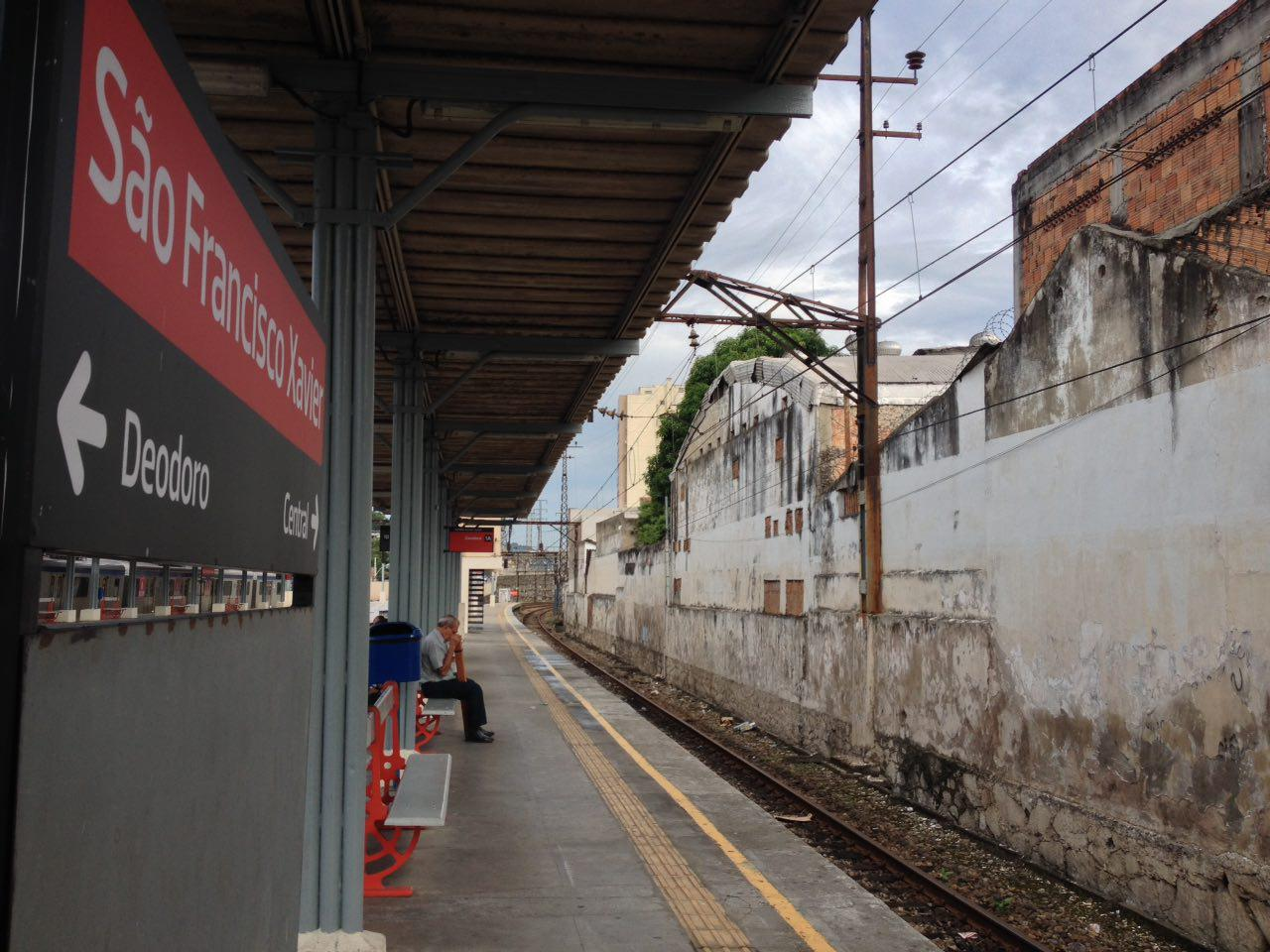
- São Francisco Xavier station in March 2016

General information
- Location: Rio de Janeiro; Brazil
- Coordinates: 22.9027028°S 43.2441722°W
- Elevation: 16 m (52 ft)
- Owner: Rio de Janeiro State Government
- Operator: SuperVia
- Line: Deodoro Line
- Platforms: 1 island platform
- Tracks: 2

Other information
- Station code: SFX

History
- Opened: 1861
- Electrified: 1937

Services
Preceding station	SuperVia	Following station
Mangueira towards Central	Deodoro	Riachuelo towards Deodoro
Location
- Location within Rio de Janeiro

São Francisco Xavier is a railway station in São Francisco Xavier, Rio de Janeiro which is serviced by the Supervia.

== History ==
The station was opened in 1861. For many years, this station was the terminus for the Linha Auxiliar (Auxiliary Line), which is now known as the Belford Roxo Line, before Alfredo Maia station (since demolished) opened in 1905. The Linha do Norte, which is now the Saracuruna and Vila Inhomirim lines, but which at the time continued to Petrópolis, also had its terminus at São Francisco Xavier before 1909. A train crash in 1935 would lead to rioters targeting the station.

== Notable places nearby ==
- Museum of Samba
- Mangueira Olympic Village
- Mangueira Samba School

== Platforms ==
Platform 1A: Towards Deodoro (Stopper)
Platform 1B: Towards Central do Brasil (Stopper)
