= Rio Comprido, Rio de Janeiro =

Rio Comprido
- Neighborhood
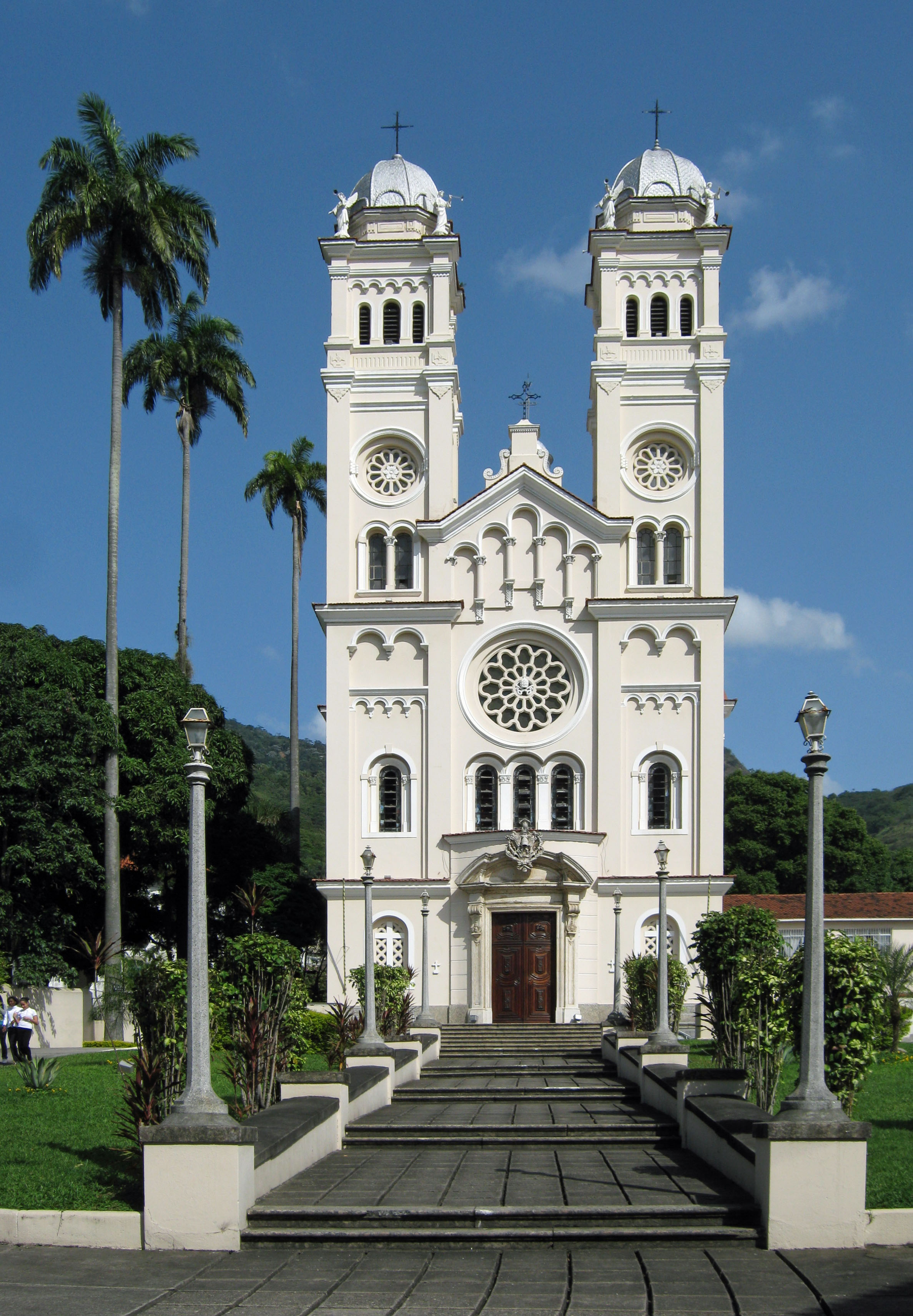

- Location in Rio de Janeiro Rio Comprido (Brazil)
- Coordinates: 22°55′39″S 43°12′29″W
- Country: Brazil
- State: Rio de Janeiro (RJ)
- Municipality/City: Rio de Janeiro
- Zone: Centro

Population (2010)
  - Total: 43,764

Rio Comprido is a neighborhood located in the center (Centro) of Rio de Janeiro city, in Brazil. It borders the Catumbi, Estácio, Praça da Bandeira and Tijuca neighborhoods.

== Etymology ==
The name Rio Comprido comes from the river passing through it. This river is currently canalized and completely degraded, and empties into Guanabara Bay. The name Rio Comprido means Long River.

== History ==
In the 17th century the Rio Comprido valley produced sugarcane, flowed off by a warehouse in embarkations which conducted it to the bay. In the 19th century, the sugar farming was replaced by coffee farming. The neighborhood was settled by Englishmen, and was known until the beginning of the 20th century as Chácara dos Ingleses (Englishmen Small Ranch).

When the Paulo de Frontin viaduct was opened, it created access to the Rebouças tunnel and to the city's southern zone, turning Rio Comprido into a passageway neighborhood, currently surrounded by lower income communities, such as Turano, Fogueteiro, Querosene, Fallet, Coroa, São Carlos and Mineira, which suffer from violence and social exclusion.
