= Macacos =

- Village
- Location of Carira in Sergipe

- Location within Brazil
- Coordinates: 10°30′6″S 37°46′10″W
- Country: Brazil
- State: Sergipe
- Municipality: Carira
- Elevation: 200 m (660 ft)

Macacos (Brazilian Portuguese pronunciation: [mɐˈkakʊ or mɐˈkakʊz]) is a village in the municipality of Carira, state of Sergipe, in northeastern Brazil. In Portuguese "macacos" means "monkeys".

== See also ==
- List of villages in Sergipe
