= Nilópolis =

- Municipality
- Município de Nilópolis
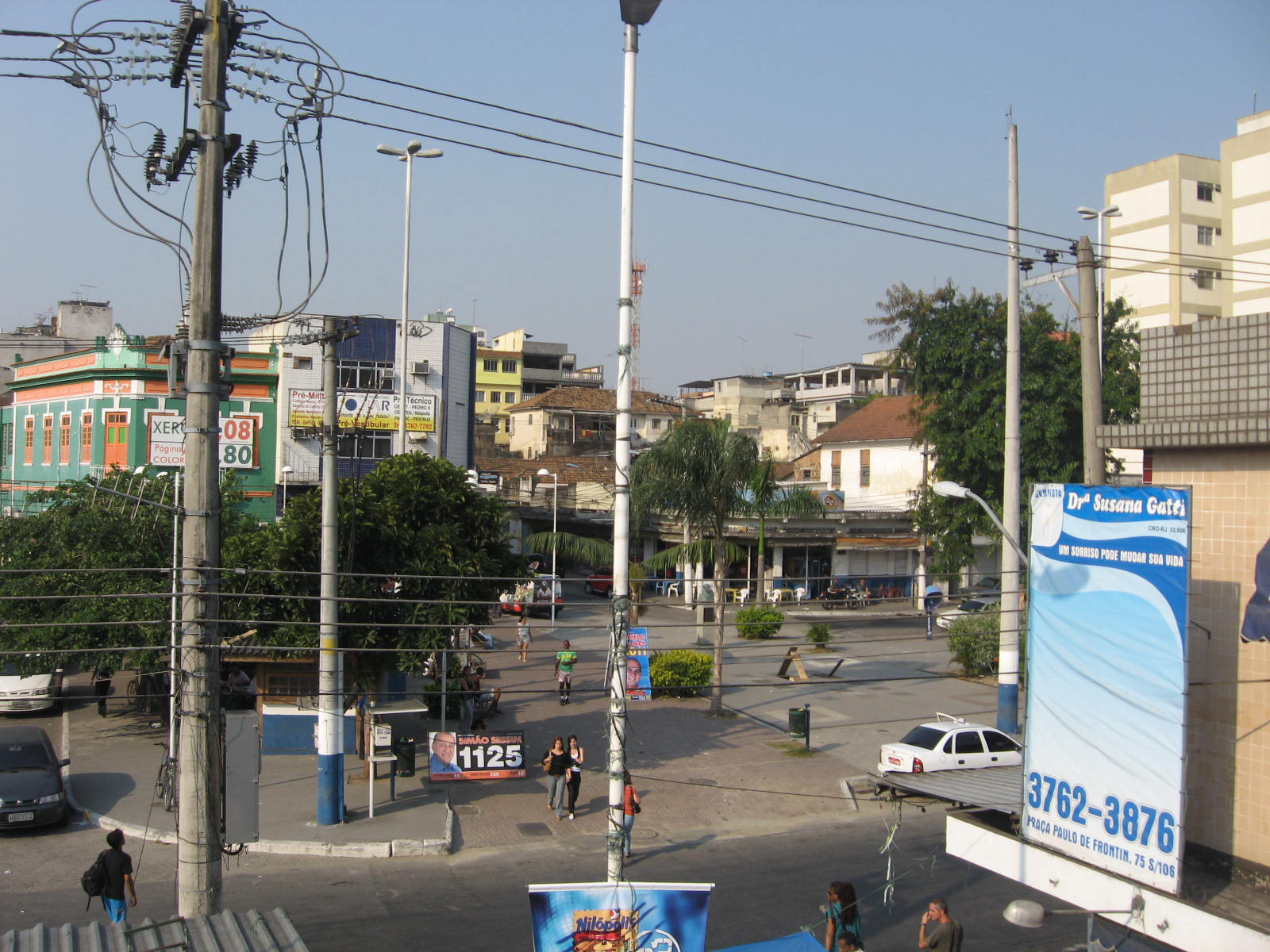
- Central Nilópolis in 2010

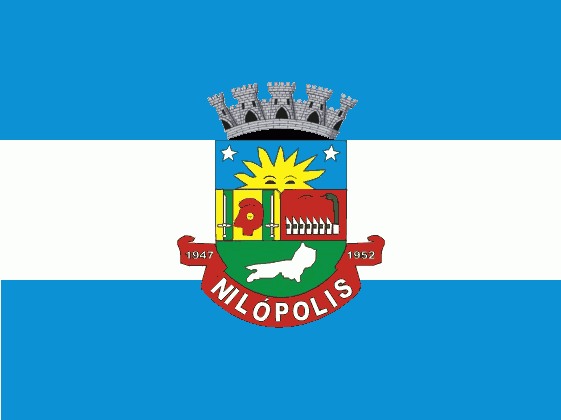
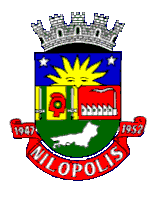
- Flag Coat of arms
- Motto: "Terra da Azul e Branca"
- Location of Nilópolis in the State of Rio de Janeiro
- Coordinates: 22°48′19″S 43°24′55.91″W
- Country: Brazil
- Region: Southeast
- State: Rio de Janeiro
- Founded: August 21, 1947

Government
  - Mayor: Abraãozinho David Neto (PL)

Area
  - Total: 19.157 km^{2} (7.397 sq mi)
- Elevation: 14 m (46 ft)

Population (2022 Census)
  - Total: 146,774
  - Estimate (2025): 155,500
  - Density: 7,661.6/km^{2} (19,844/sq mi)
- Time zone: UTC-3
- Postal Code: 28000-000
- Area code: +55 21
- Website: www.nilopolis.rj.gov.br

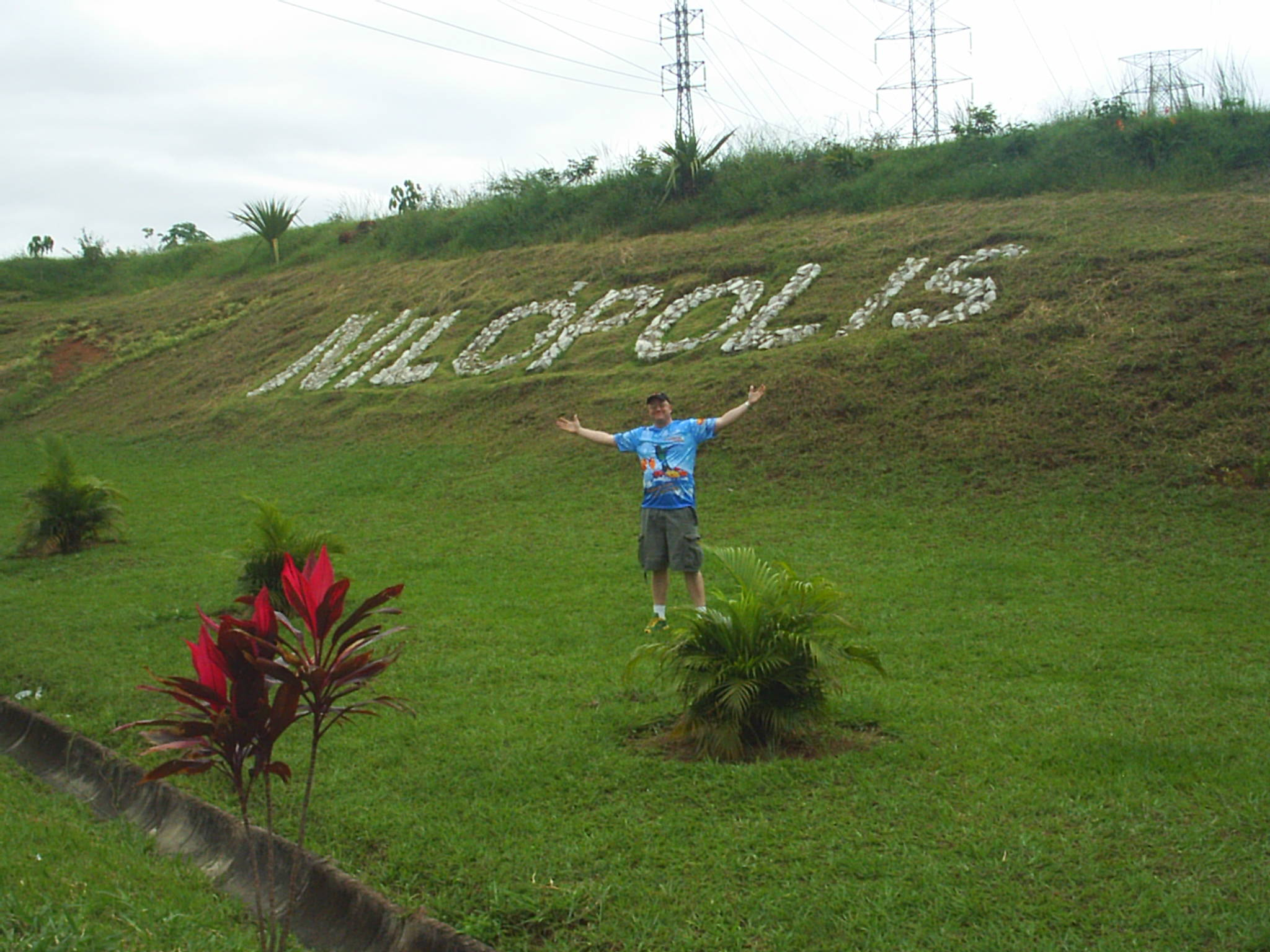
Entrance to Nilópolis City.

Nilópolis (Portuguese pronunciation: [niˈlɔpoliʃ], [niˈlɔpɔliʃ], [niˈlɔpuliʃ]) is a municipality in Brazil, located in the Rio de Janeiro state's southwestern region, bordering São João de Meriti, Mesquita and Rio de Janeiro. It is the smallest municipality in Rio de Janeiro state, with a total area of 19.39 km^{2}. The population of 162,693 inhabitants living in an area of 9 km^{2} and the remaining area corresponds to the Gericinó's Natural Park. Officially, the population density exceeds 8,120 inhabitants/km^{2}, but if calculated just 9 km^{2} occupied, it becomes the most densely populated city in Brazil with more than 17.400 inhabitants/km^{2}. Currently, São João de Meriti has the highest population density, with 12,897 inhabitants/km^{2}.

The city was named after Nilo Peçanha, a President of Brazil.

== Transport ==
Nilópolis is served by bus companies owned by the municipality, such as Nilopolitana Cavalcanti & Cia, and other companies that are not based in the city but provide services to its population.

=== Railway ===
Nilópolis also has two train stations, one in the city center, Nilópolis Station, and the other in the Olinda neighborhood, Olinda Station. Both are part of SuperVia's Japeri Line.

== Beija Flor ==
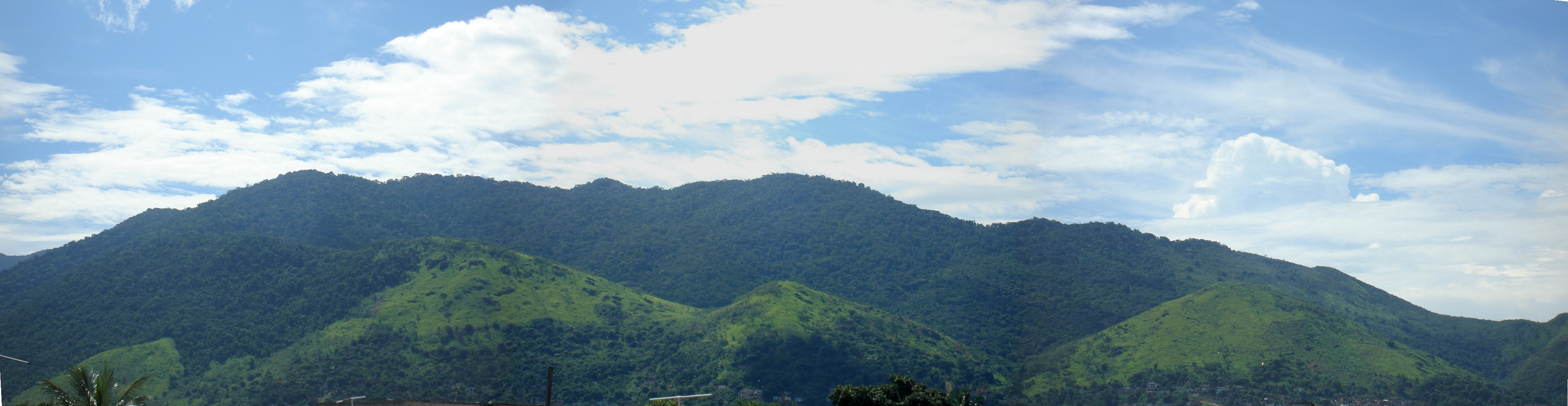
Gericinó mountain, Mesquita City, seen from Nilópolis

Nilópolis is famous for its Grêmio Recreativo Escola de Samba Beija-Flor de Nilópolis, one of the most successful Samba schools and usually a top contender for winning the carnival parade in Rio.
