= Paciência =

- Neighborhood
- Location in Rio de Janeiro Paciência (Brazil)
- Coordinates: 22°54′35″S 43°38′15″W
- Country: Brazil
- State: Rio de Janeiro (RJ)
- Municipality/City: Rio de Janeiro
- Zone: West Zone

Population (2010)
  - Total: 94,626

Paciência is a neighborhood in the West Zone of Rio de Janeiro, Brazil.

After the inauguration in 1878 of the Campo Grande station of the Brazilian Central Railway made it easier to reach the center of the city quickly, the area, including the nearby neighbourhood of Paciência, began to develop rapidly; later Paciência got its own station.

The neighbourhood is also near Santa Cruz and Sepetiba. There are around 85.000 inhabitants. There are 25 elementary and high schools.
