= Magalhães Bastos =

- Neighborhood
- Location in Rio de Janeiro Magalhães Bastos (Brazil)
- Coordinates: 22°52′20″S 43°24′45″W
- Country: Brazil
- State: Rio de Janeiro (RJ)
- Municipality/City: Rio de Janeiro
- Zone: West Zone

Magalhães Bastos is a neighborhood in the West Zone of Rio de Janeiro, Brazil.
