= Inhoaíba =

Inhaoaíba
- Neighborhood
- Location in Rio de Janeiro Inhaoaíba (Brazil)
- Coordinates: 22°54′41″S 43°35′32″W
- Country: Brazil
- State: Rio de Janeiro (RJ)
- Municipality/City: Rio de Janeiro
- Zone: West Zone

Population (2010)
  - Total: 64,649

Inhoaíba is a neighborhood in the West Zone of Rio de Janeiro, Brazil.
