= Cosmos, Rio de Janeiro =

Cosmos
- Neighborhood
- Location in Rio de Janeiro Cosmos (Brazil)
- Coordinates: 22°54′32″S 43°36′46″W
- Country: Brazil
- State: Rio de Janeiro (RJ)
- Municipality/City: Rio de Janeiro
- Zone: West Zone

Population (2022)
  - Total: 95,484

Cosmos is a neighborhood in the West Zone of Rio de Janeiro, Brazil.
