= Quintino Bocaiuva, Rio de Janeiro =

Quintino Bocaiuva
- Neighborhood
- Location in Rio de Janeiro Quintino Bocaiuva (Brazil)
- Coordinates: 22°53′43″S 43°19′31″W
- Country: Brazil
- State: Rio de Janeiro (RJ)
- Municipality/City: Rio de Janeiro
- Zone: North Zone

Quintino Bocaiuva is a neighborhood of Rio de Janeiro, Brazil. The locality is famous for being the former home of football (soccer) player Zico, who was nicknamed "Little Rooster from Quintino".
