= Sampaio, Rio de Janeiro =

Sampaio
- Neighborhood
- Location in Rio de Janeiro Sampaio (Brazil)
- Coordinates: 22°54′03″S 43°15′38″W
- Country: Brazil
- State: Rio de Janeiro (RJ)
- Municipality/City: Rio de Janeiro
- Zone: North Zone

Population (2022)
  - Total: 8,832

Sampaio is a neighborhood in the North Zone of Rio de Janeiro, Brazil.
