= Cascadura, Rio de Janeiro =

Neighborhood in Rio de Janeiro, Brazil

Cascadura
- Neighborhood
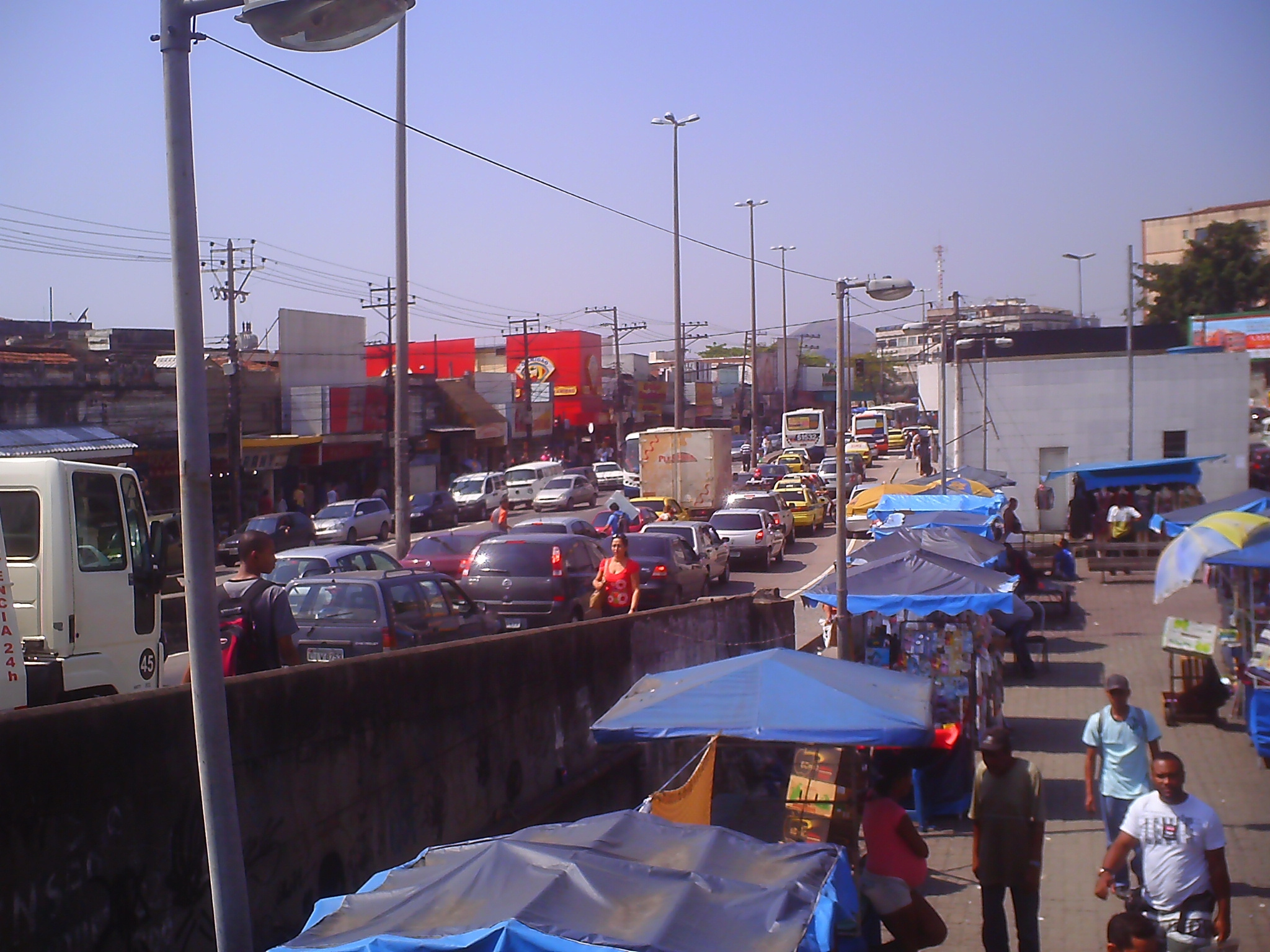

- Location in Rio de Janeiro Cascadura (Brazil)
- Coordinates: 22°53′07″S 43°19′42″W
- Country: Brazil
- State: Rio de Janeiro (RJ)
- Municipality/City: Rio de Janeiro
- Zone: North Zone

Population (2010)
  - Total: 34,456

Cascadura is a neighborhood in the North Zone of Rio de Janeiro, Brazil.
