= Riachuelo, Rio de Janeiro =

Riachuelo
- Neighborhood
- Location in Rio de Janeiro Riachuelo (Brazil)
- Coordinates: 22°54′10″S 43°15′20″W
- Country: Brazil
- State: Rio de Janeiro (RJ)
- Municipality/City: Rio de Janeiro
- Zone: North Zone

Riachuelo is a neighborhood in the North Zone of Rio de Janeiro, Brazil.
