= São Francisco Xavier, Rio de Janeiro =

São Francisco Xavier
- Neighborhood
- Location in Rio de Janeiro São Francisco Xavier (Brazil)
- Coordinates: 22°54′12″S 43°14′36″W
- Country: Brazil
- State: Rio de Janeiro (RJ)
- Municipality/City: Rio de Janeiro
- Zone: North Zone

São Francisco Xavier is a neighborhood in the North Zone of Rio de Janeiro, Brazil.
