= Praça da Bandeira =

- Neighborhood
- Praça da Bandeira within Rio de Janeiro city
- Interactive map of Praça da Bandeira
- Coordinates: 22°54′41″S 43°12′50″W
- Country: Brazil
- State: Rio de Janeiro (RJ)
- Municipality/City: Rio de Janeiro
- Zone: North Zone
- Administrative Region: VIII - Tijuca

Area
  - Total: 71.99 ha (177.9 acres)

Population (2010)
  - Total: 8,662
  - Density: 12,030/km^{2} (31,160/sq mi)

Praça da Bandeira is a neighborhood in the North Zone of Rio de Janeiro, Brazil.
