= Central do Brasil =

Metro station in Rio de Janeiro, Brazil

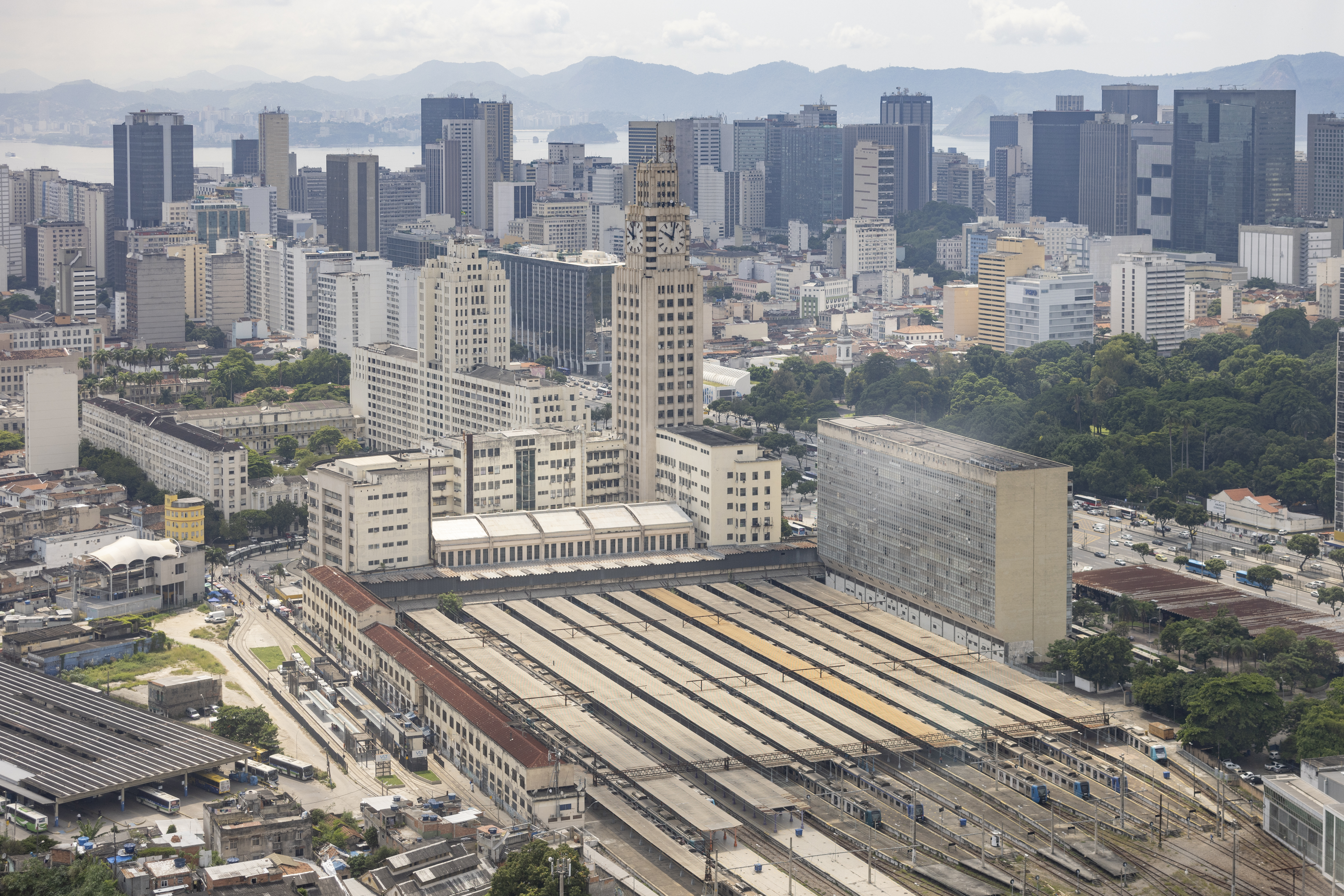
- View of the station

General information
- Location: Praça Cristiano Ottoni; Centro, Rio de Janeiro, RJ; Brazil
- Coordinates: 22°54′12.29″S 43°11′29.20″W
- Owner: Government of the State of Rio de Janeiro
- Operator: SuperVia
- Platforms: Island and side platforms
- Connections: 1 2; 2 3; Américo Mourano Road Terminal

Construction
- Structure type: At-grade
- Architectural style: Art deco

Other information
- Station code: CBL/DPO

History
- Opened: 29 March 1858; 168 years ago
- Rebuilt: 1943; 83 years ago
- Electrified: 1937; 89 years ago
- Former names: Estação do Campo; Estação da Corte; Estação Dom Pedro II

Services
| Preceding station | SuperVia | Following station |
|---|---|---|
| Terminus | Deodoro | Praça da Bandeira towards Deodoro |
| Terminus | Santa Cruz | São Cristóvão towards Santa Cruz |
| Terminus | Japeri | São Cristóvão towards Japeri |
| Terminus | Belford Roxo | São Cristóvão towards Belford Roxo |
| Terminus | Saracuruna | São Cristóvão towards Saracuruna |
Out-of-system interchange
| Preceding station | Rio de Janeiro Metro | Following station |
|---|---|---|
| Praça Onze towards Uruguai | Line 1 | Presidente Vargas towards General Osório |
| Cidade Nova towards Pavuna | Line 2 | Presidente Vargas towards Botafogo |
Location
- Location within Rio de Janeiro Location within Brazil

Estação Central do Brasil (Brazilian Portuguese pronunciation: [istaˈsɐ̃w sẽˈtɾaw du bɾaˈziw]) is a major train station in the Brazilian city of Rio de Janeiro. The station is located in downtown Rio de Janeiro, along the Avenida Presidente Vargas and across from the Campo de Santana park. It is one of the most famous train stations in Brazil, and was previously called Estação Dom Pedro II, a name by which it is still also known unofficially.

The station is the last stop of Rio de Janeiro's suburban railway network, as well as a hub for connection with the city subway and a bus station. Central do Brasil was also a preeminent stop in the interstate Central do Brasil railroad, which linked Rio de Janeiro with São Paulo and Minas Gerais, though the railroad is now deactivated.

The station opened in 1858, and the current station building in the Art Deco style opened in 1943.

== History ==
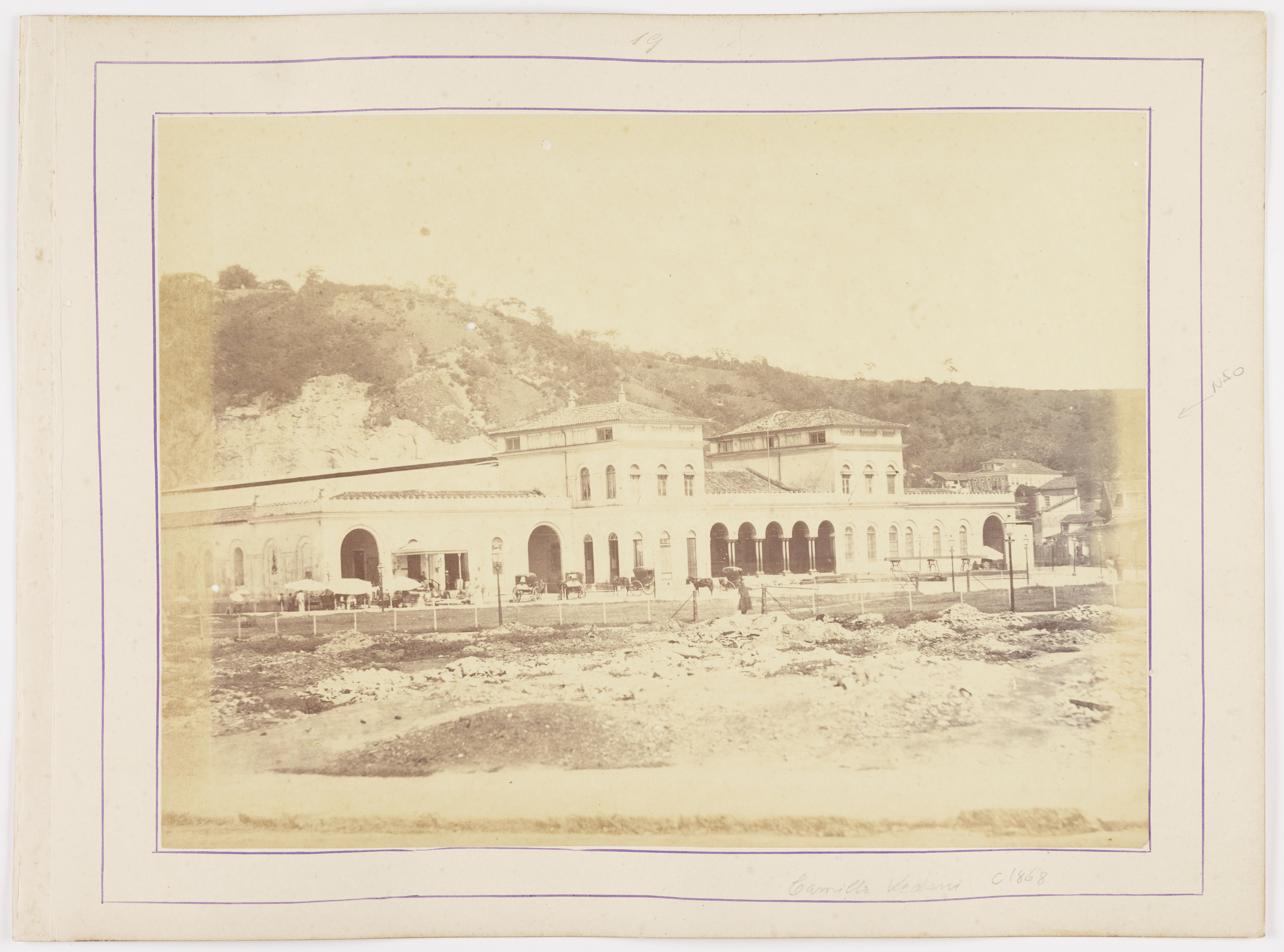
The station building in the 1860s.

The construction of the first station in the centre of Rio de Janeiro began in 1855, to serve as the terminus of the new Estrada de Ferro Dom Pedro II (Dom Pedro II Railway) which was to connect the city, then the capital of Brazil, with the provinces of São Paulo and Minas Gerais. The location chosen for this station was the Campo de Santana, an area close to the city center and at the time the site of many government buildings. Its construction necessitated the demolition of the Igreja de Santa Ana (Church of Saint Anne) dating from 1735, but a wooden image of the saint, originating from Portugal, can still be found in a chapel at the station. The station, then known as the Estação do Campo due to its location, was opened along with the first section of the railway line from Rio de Janeiro to Queimados in March 1858 in the presence of Emperor Pedro II, Empress Teresa Christine and the bishop. The name of the station was shortly afterwards changed to Estação da Corte, in reference to the Imperial Court.

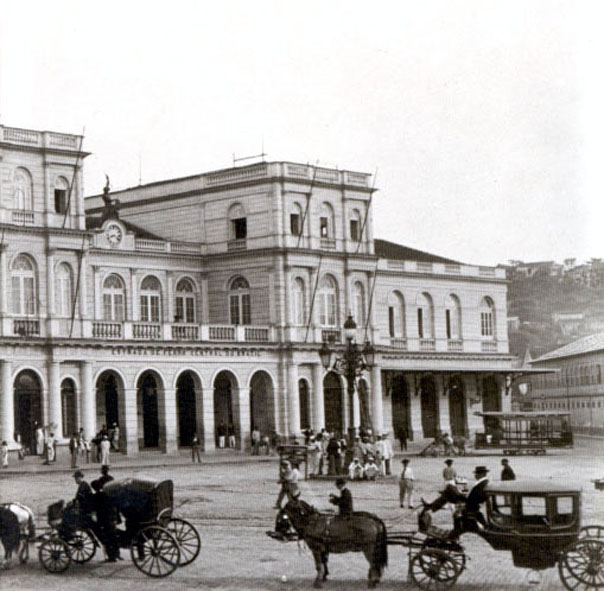
The station in 1889.

Already in 1870, the station was renovated and enlarged following a project by Jorge Grademaker Grunewald, to accommodate the growing number of passengers living in the new suburban districts served by the train. The project preserved the appearance of the old station building with a central building flanked by two large side wings and had a station clock in the centre. From 1876 to 1880, new warehouses were built under the direction of Francisco Pereira Passos. On 21 November 1879, electric lighting was installed in the station as a first for a public building in Brazil. In 1906, one of the wings was destroyed by fire.

In 1908, at the occasion of the fiftieth anniversary of the inauguration of the station, projects were launched to build a new station, which, however, were not carried out. In 1919, other projects for a new station were launched due to the development of coffee production at the beginning of the 20th century. Another new project was presented in 1922 by the architects Samuel and Cristiano das Neves, but was not developed. On 2 December 1925, by decree of the then President of Brazil Artur da Silva Bernardes, the station was renamed Estaçao Dom Pedro II (Dom Pedro II Station) in honour of Emperor Pedro II at the occasion of the centenary of his birth in 1825.

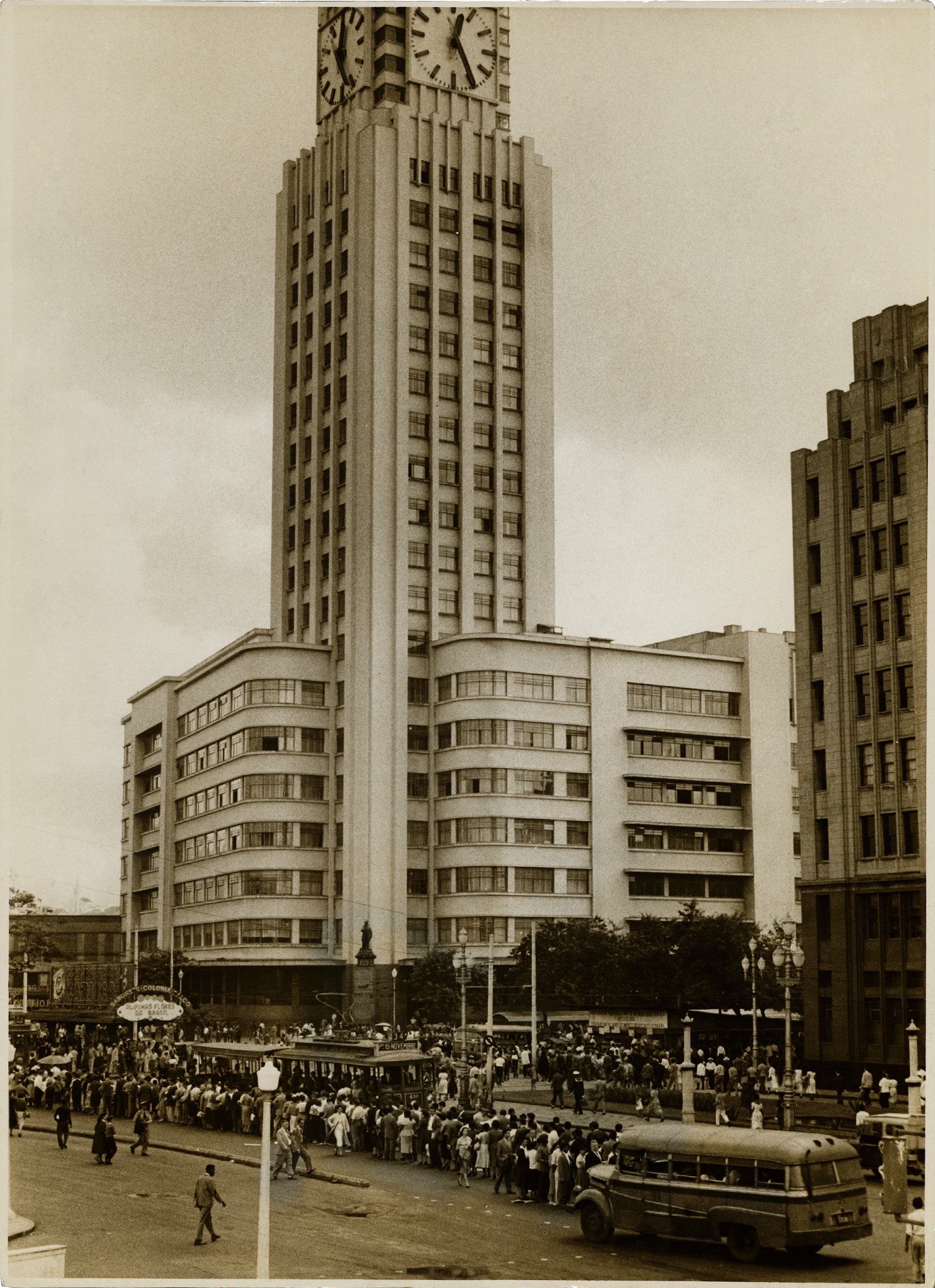
The new station building in 1957.

Finally, work on a new station started in 1936. The cornerstone was laid on 29 March 1936, but the project by Roberto Magno de Carvalho was largely modified after the start of the construction. From 1937, the new authoritarian regime in Brazil, the Estado Novo, undertook major works in Rio de Janeiro, in particular the construction of new buildings for public institutions, and the widening and opening of streets, including the creation of the Avenida Presidente Vargas and ambitions for a much larger train station. The task of preparing a new building project for the station was entrusted to the architectural firm of the British architect Robert Prentice which concluded the altered project on 29 November 1937. The old station building was demolished in 1939, and the new station building in Art Deco style (which also served as the seat of the Estrada de Ferro Central do Brasil) opened in 1943, and was completed in 1945.

On 5 March 1979, the station was connected to Line 1 of the Rio de Janeiro Metro.

After passenger traffic on medium and long-distance routes in Brazil was practically stopped in the 1990s, Central do Brasil now serves as a terminus and hub for Rio de Janeiro's suburban trains operated by SuperVia.

Since 2014, the station has also been served by the Teleférico da Providência, a gondola lift service connecting it with the neighborhood of Providência.

== Architecture ==
The Art Deco-style building features a twenty-eight-story tower and a large four-sided clock. The station is visible from almost every part of the city and at the time of construction it was the tallest building in South America and the tallest reinforced concrete structure in the world.

== Layout ==
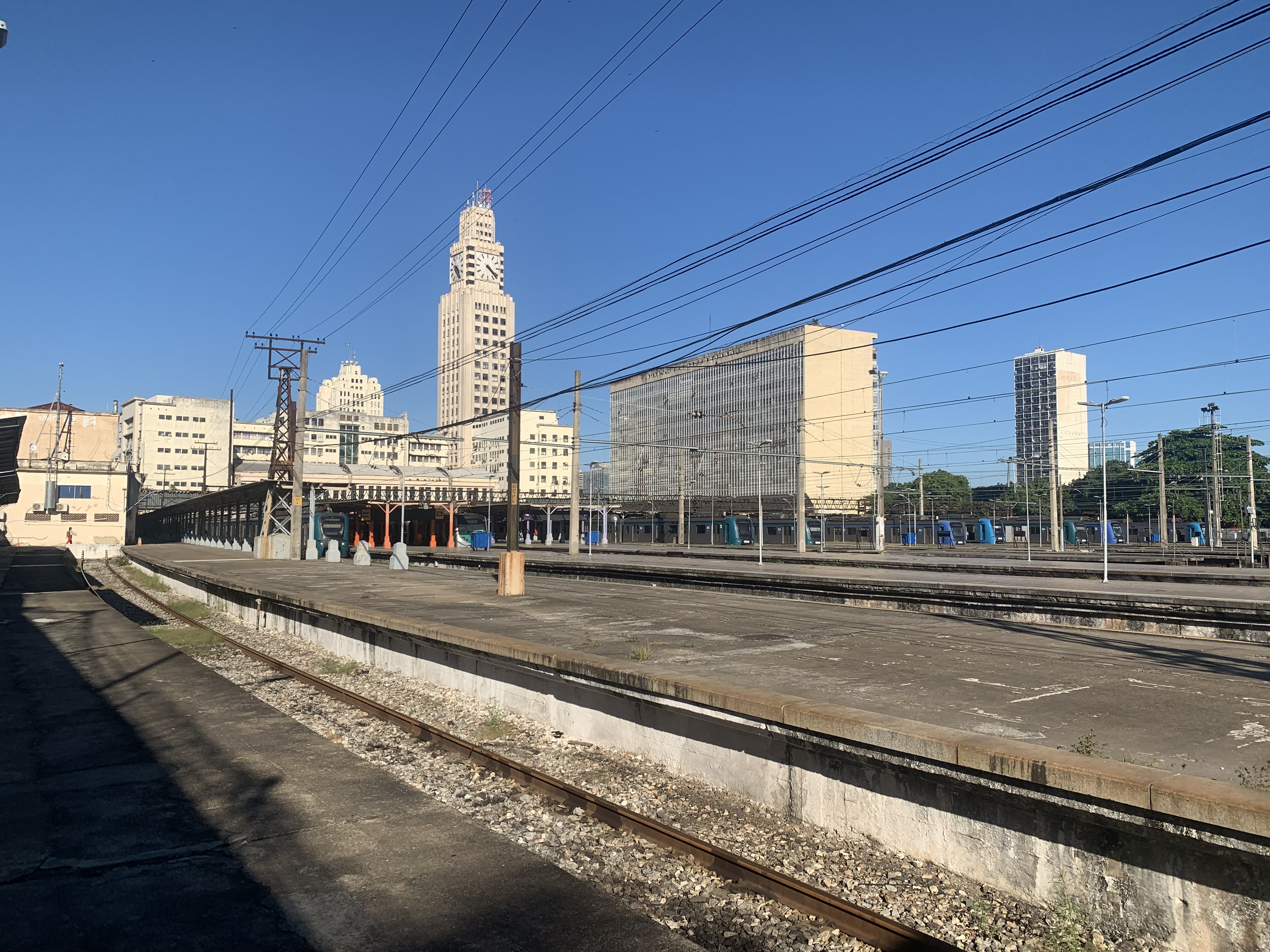
View of the tracks and platforms in 2024.

== Lines ==
- Deodoro Line
- Santa Cruz Line
- Japeri Line
- Belford Roxo Line
- Saracuruna Line

== In popular culture ==
=== In cinema ===
The film Central Station, by Walter Salles, is set in the station of the same name.

== Gallery ==
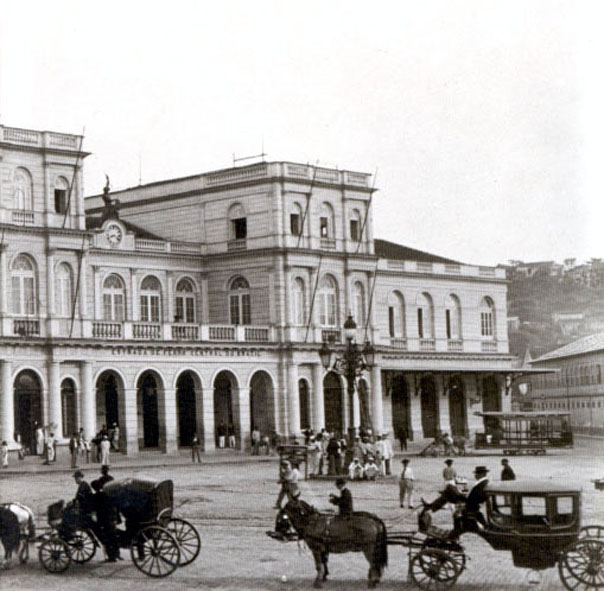
Former building of the Estação Dom Pedro II, 1889

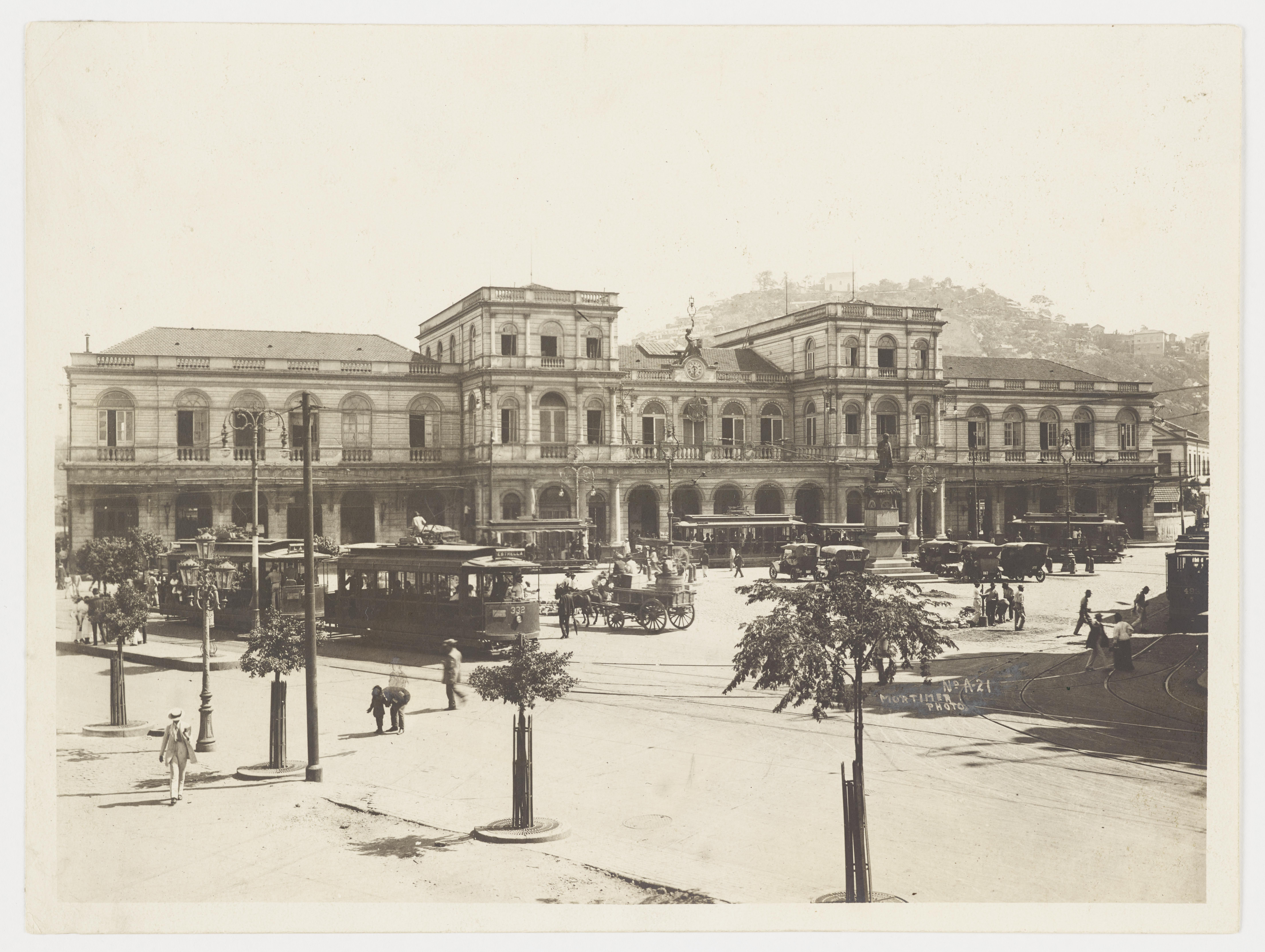
Former building of the Estação Dom Pedro II, 1906

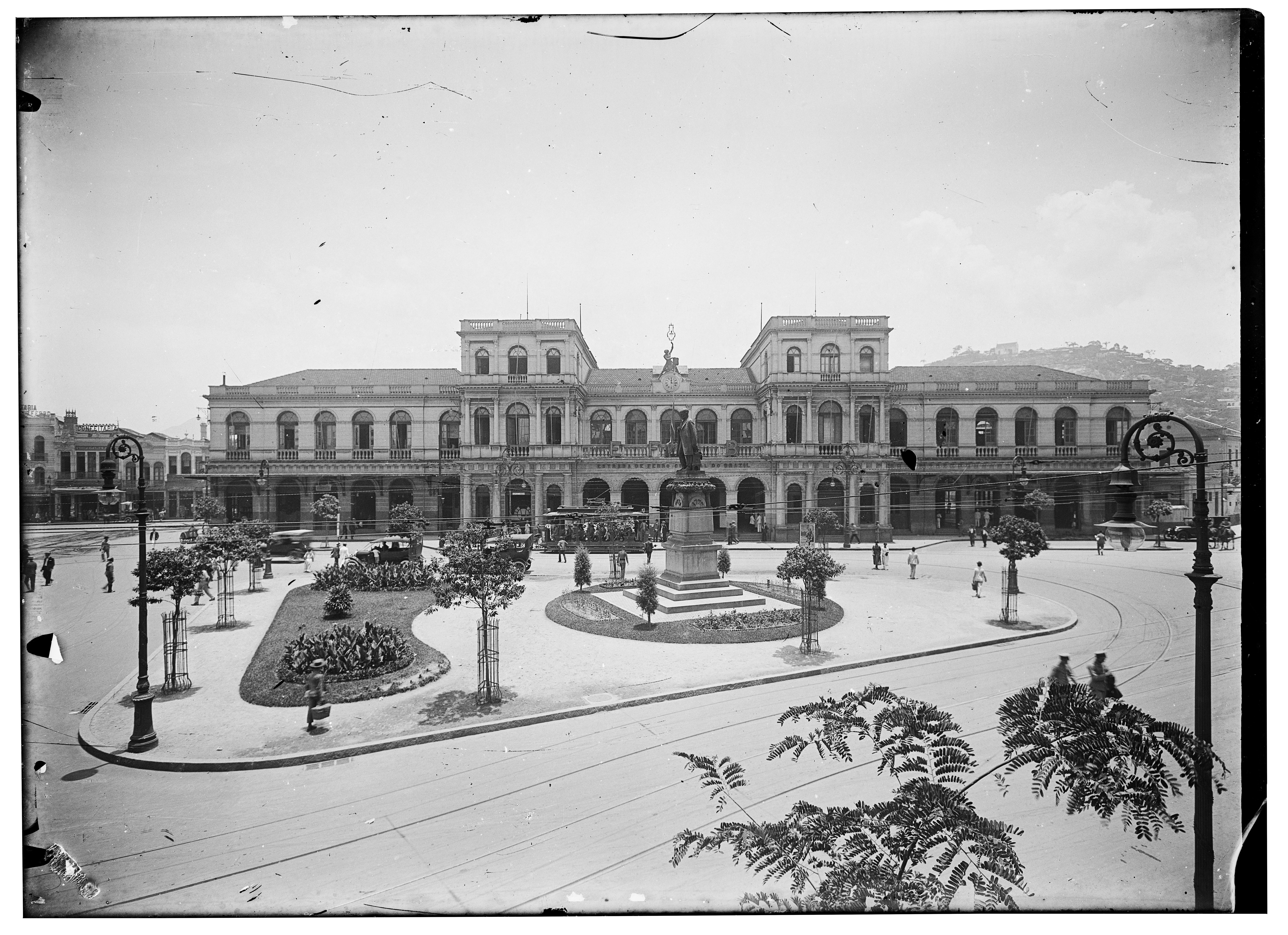
Former building of the Estação Dom Pedro II, 1910s

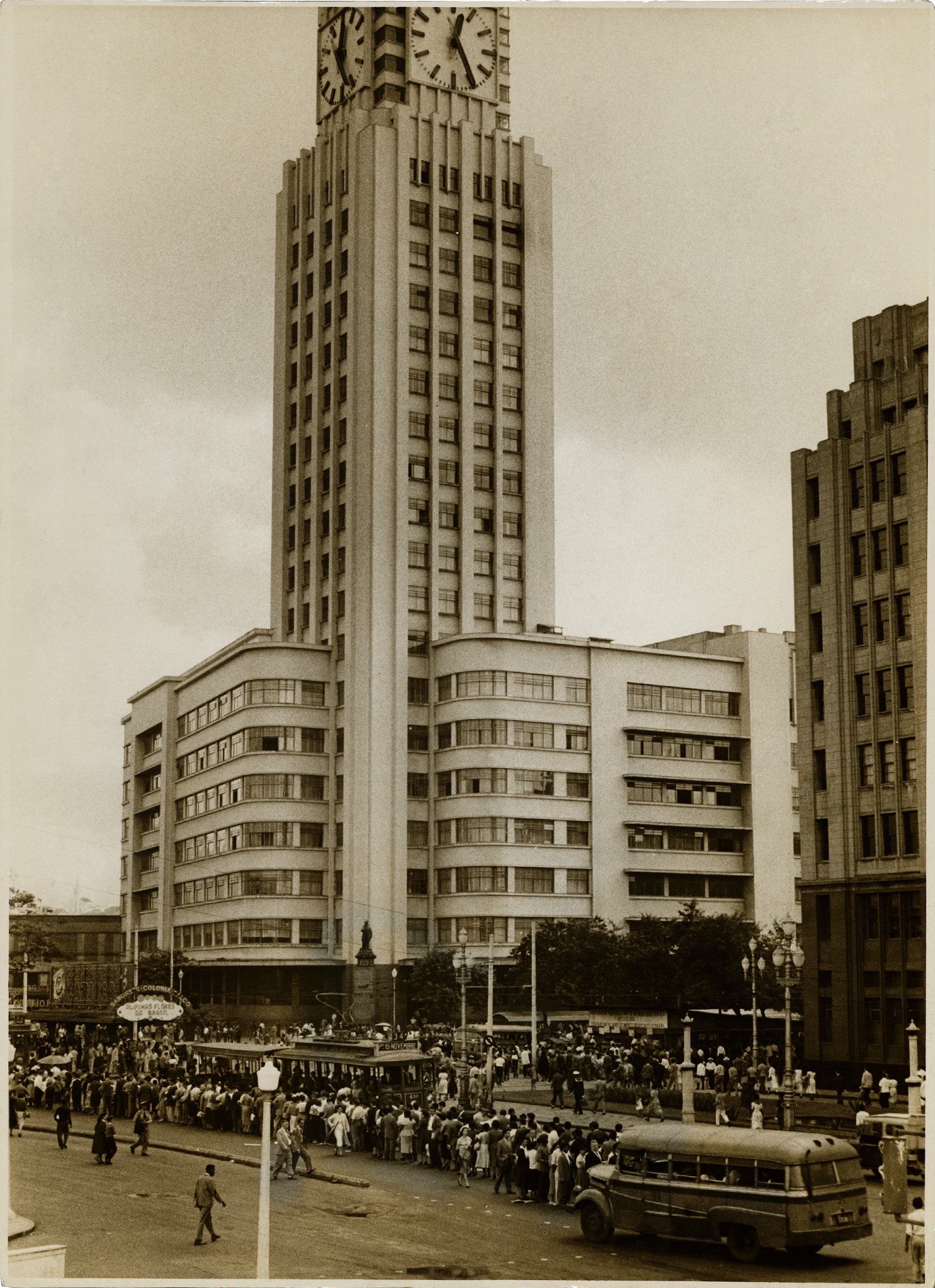
Building of Central do Brasil, 1957

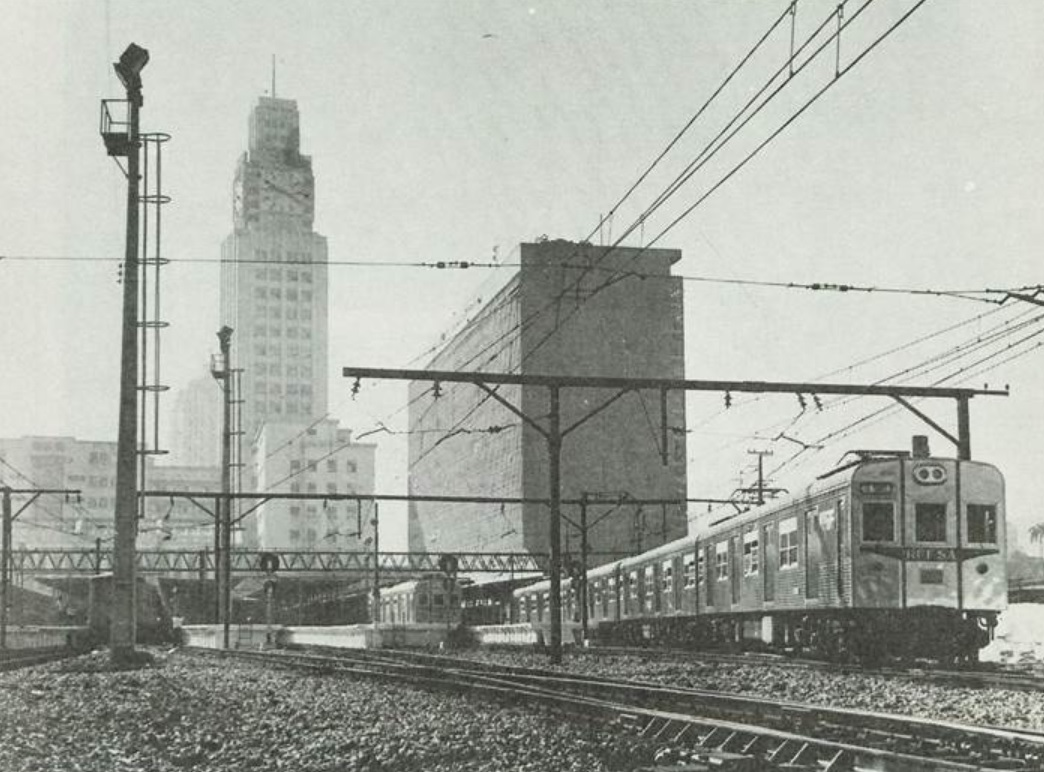
Trains at Central do Brasil, 1979
