= Estrada de Ferro Central do Brasil =

Central do Brasil Railway
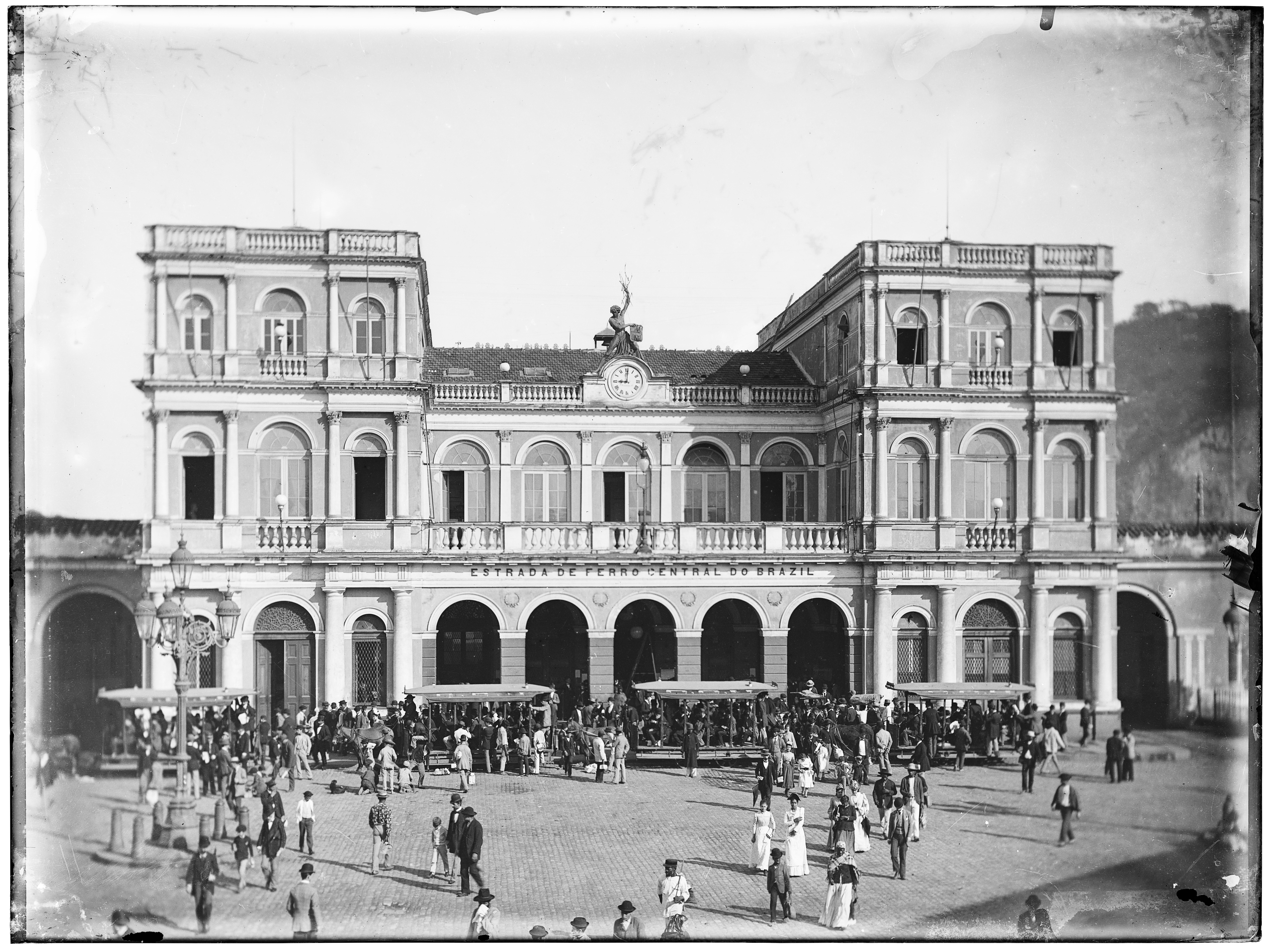
- Central do Brasil Station, c. 1890s

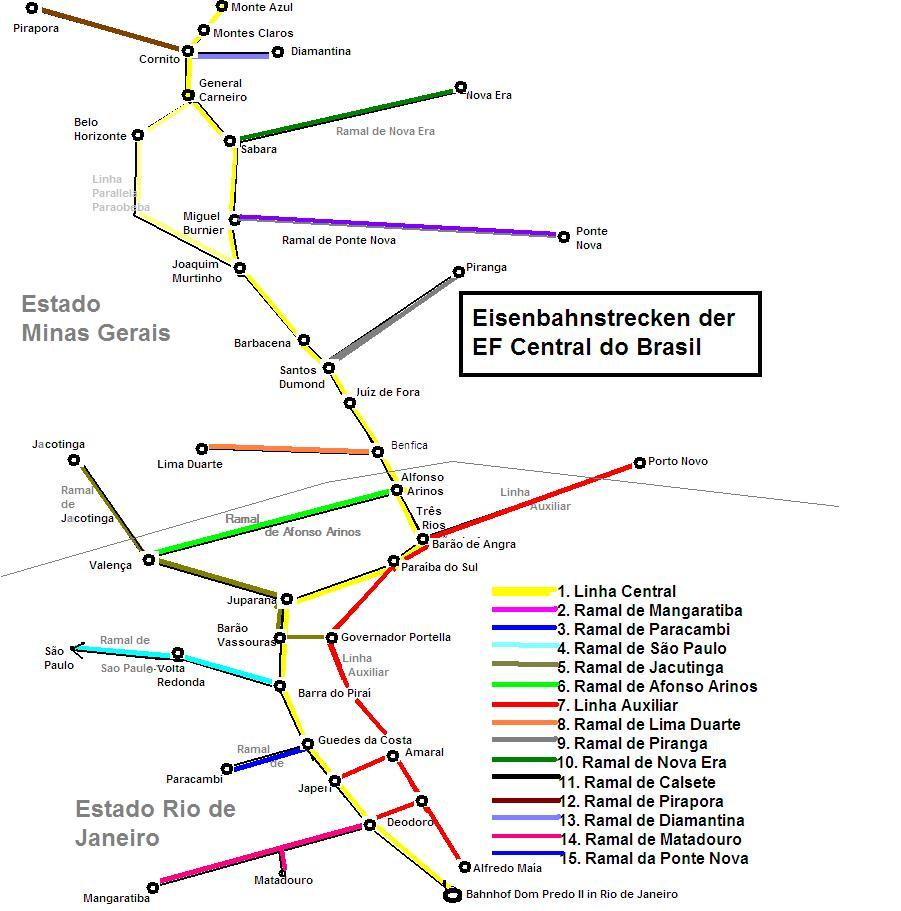
- System map

Overview
- Headquarters: Rio de Janeiro, Brazil
- Reporting mark: EFCB
- Locale: Southeastern Brazil
- Dates of operation: 1858–1957
- Successor: RFFSA

The Estrada de Ferro Central do Brasil was one of the principal railways of Brazil, uniting the states of Rio de Janeiro, São Paulo and Minas Gerais.

== Origins ==
On 9 February 1855, The imperial government of Brazil signed a contract with Edward Price for the construction of the first section of a railway which had the aim of linking the court (then in the city of Rio de Janeiro) with the provinces of São Paulo and Minas Gerais.

It was constituted as the Companhia de Estrada de Ferro Dom Pedro II, under the directorship of Christiano Benedicto Ottoni. Works commenced on 11 June 1855 and on 29 March 1858, the 48 km 1,600 mm (5 ft 3 in) gauge section from Rio de Janeiro to Freguesia de Nossa Senhora da Conceição de Marapicu (now Queimados) was completed.

At this time there were 5 stations: Campo, Engenho Novo, Cascadura (all in the city of Rio), Maxambomba (now Nova Iguaçu) and Queimados. On 8 November the railway was extended to Belém (now Japeri) at the foot of the Serra do Mar.

== Expansion ==
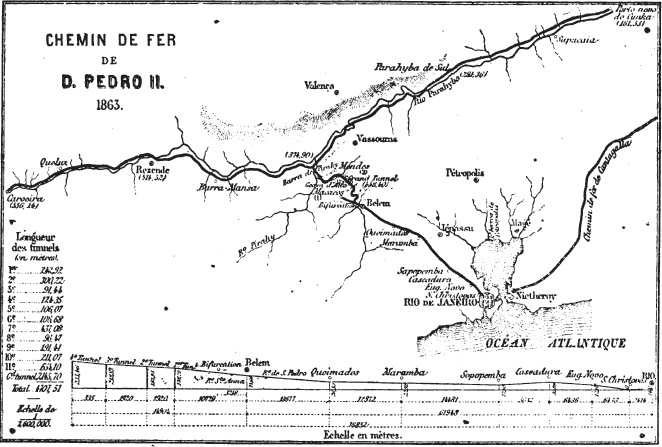
Estrada de Ferro Dom Pedro II (1863).

In 1860, the Japeri to Macacos branch was completed. On 12 July 1863 Rodeio (now Engenheiro Paulo de Frontin) was reached and, in 1864 the Paraíba do Sul. The first passenger train ran to Barra do Piraí on 9 August 1864.

After crossing the Serra do Mar the line forked with the main line going in the direction of Entre Rios (now Três Rios) and the other, the São Paulo branch, heading for Porto de Cachoeira (now Cachoeira Paulista), reaching there on 20 July 1875.

In Entre Rios (which was reached on 13 October 1867), the EF Dom Pedro II connected with the Estrada de Rodagem União e Indústria (1861) which went from Petrópolis to Juiz de Fora. From there it went on to other municipalities of Minas Gerais, reaching Queluz de Minas (now Conselheiro Lafaiete) in 1883.

== The EF Central do Brasil ==
When the Brazilian republic was proclaimed in 1889 the Estrada de Ferro Dom Pedro II was renamed Estrada de Ferro Central do Brasil (officially changing on 22 November). Meanwhile the extension works continued.

In 1895 the Minas Gerais tracks arrived at General Carneiro and split in the directions of Belo Horizonte and Sete Lagoas. The city of São Paulo had been reached in 1890 after the incorporation of the São Paulo and Rio de Janeiro railway which connected Cachoeira to São Paulo .

At the close of the 19th century, the EF Central do Brasil was still being extended, mainly by the incorporation of existing lines. However, some of the branch lines were loss making, often prejudicing the profitability of the main lines.

== Connection to Bahia ==
The railway arrived at Monte Azul in Minas Gerais near the border with the state of Bahia, on 10 September 1947 and in 1950 the Viação Férrea Federal Leste Brasileiro from Salvador also arrived there connecting with the Central do Brasil.

== Final Days ==
On 16 March 1957 the company came under the control of Rede Ferroviária Federal S.A. (RFFSA). One of the main consequences was the dividing up of various suburban systems which had been part of the Estrada de Ferro Central do Brasil, the closure of unprofitable lines and the absorption of some sections into other railways.

With the construction and later doubling of the Presidente Dutra motorway between São Paulo and Rio de Janeiro in 1967 (competing with its most lucrative line), the railway ceased to be a major player, a process aggravated by inefficient administration in the RFFSA and the fact that railway transport had ceased to be a priority of the federal government.

During the petroleum crisis of 1973 there were attempts to modernize passenger transport; like the use of Ganz-Mavag locomotives – the so-called Hungarian train – between 1974 and 1978 in a failed attempt to develop a fast connection between Rio and São Paulo. In 1990 services between Rio de Janeiro and São Paulo and between São Paulo and Belo Horizonte had all but ceased. There was an attempt to reinstate the Trem de Prata (silver train), a luxury service between the Rio and São Paulo run by a private company which ran for a short while but could not compete with the air and road connections between these two cities. A sparse service continued until 1996 but these ceased with the privatization of the RFFSA.

Nowadays, the suburban lines of São Paulo are run by Companhia Paulista de Trens Metropolitanos (CPTM) and those of Rio de Janeiro by Supervia. The rest of the network was divided up between 1,600 mm (5 ft 3 in) broad gauge (under the responsibility of MRS Logística) and the 1,000 mm (3 ft 3 3/8 in) metre gauge (under Ferrovia Centro-Atlântica (FCA)).

The name "Central do Brasil" now only exists in the terminal station of SuperVia in Rio de Janeiro. This station was the setting for the film Central Station which was nominated for the best foreign language film Oscar in 1998.

== See also ==
- Rail transport in Brazil
