= Deodoro station =

Metro station in Rio de Janeiro, Brazil

Coordinates: 22.854889°S 43.383653°W

Deodoro Station
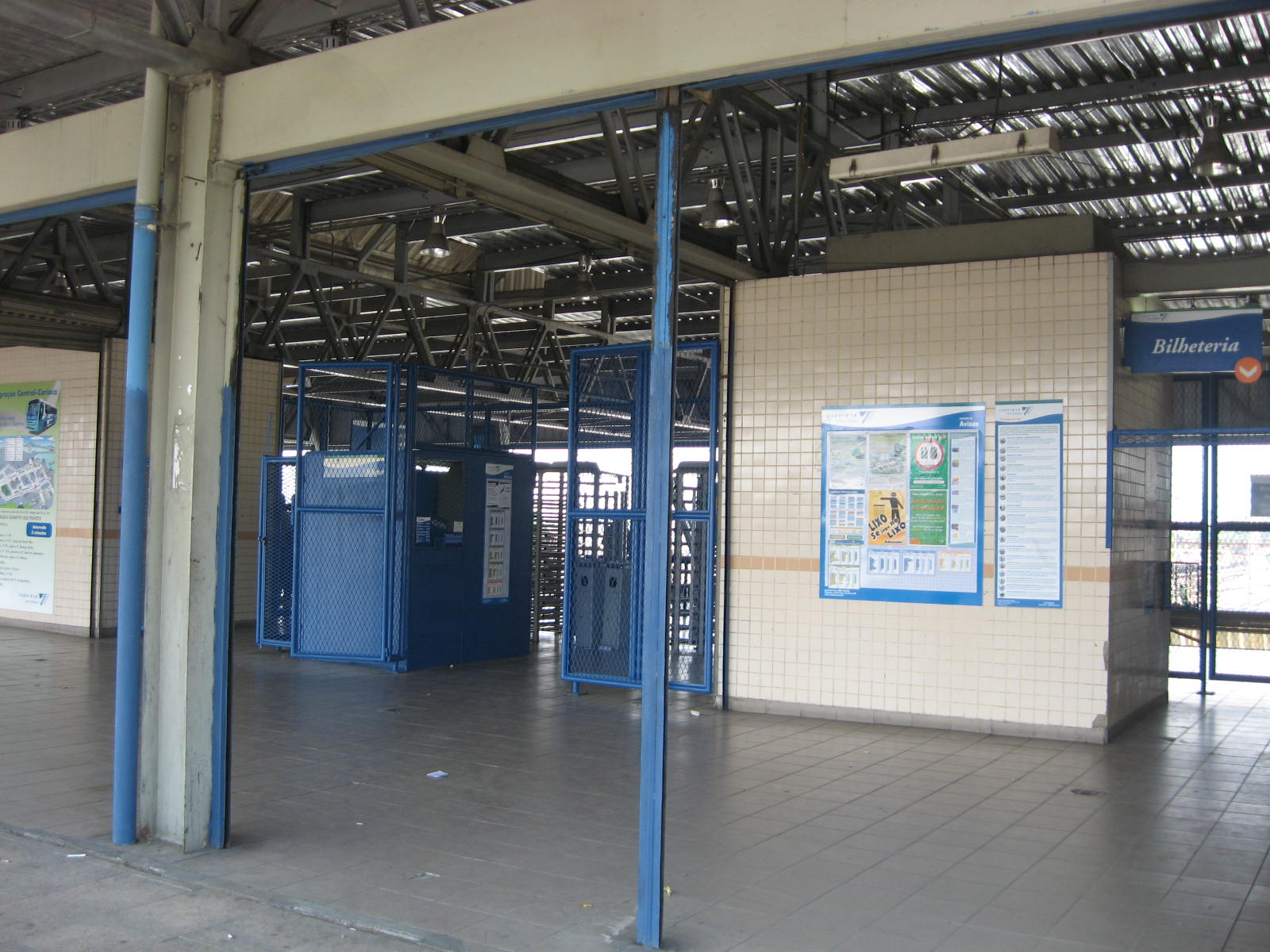
- Deodoro Station

General information
- Location: Rio de Janeiro; Brazil
- System: Commuter
- Lines: SuperVia; Deodoro Line; Santa Cruz Line; Japeri Line

History
- Opened: 1859; 167 years ago

Services
Preceding station	SuperVia	Following station
Marechal Hermes towards Central	Deodoro	Terminus
Madureira towards Central	Santa Cruz	Vila Militar towards Santa Cruz
Madureira towards Central	Japeri	Ricardo de Albuquerque towards Japeri
Location

Deodoro Station is a railway station in the West Zone of Rio de Janeiro that serves as the terminal of the Deodoro Line. It is also on the Santa Cruz and Japeri lines.

== History ==
The station was opened in 1859 and was initially known as Sapopemba. It was part of the Mangaratiba branch of the Estrada de Ferro Central do Brasil.

The current name was adopted in the early 1900s in honour of Deodoro da Fonseca, the first president of Brazil.

== Access ==
The station provides access to the Deodoro Olympic Park, which hosted events at the 2016 Summer Olympics.

== Sources ==
- Max Vasconcellos: Vias Brasileiras de Comunicação, 1928
