= Rua da Carioca =

Street in Rio de Janeiro, Brazil

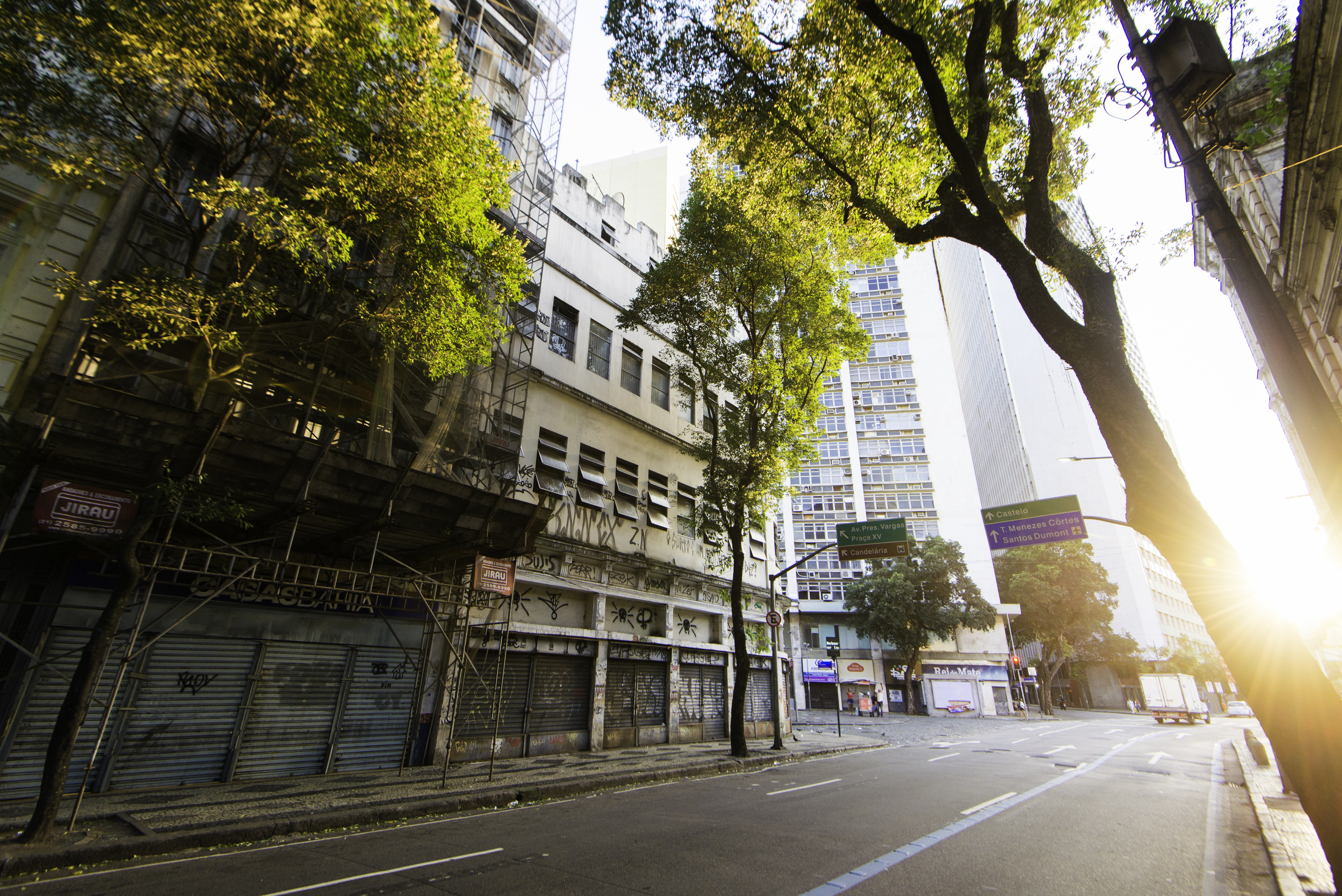
- Interactive map of Rua da Carioca
- Former names: Rua do Egito (1697–1741), Rua do Piolho (1741–1848)
- Type: Street
- Width: 17 meters (roadway)
- Location: Rio de Janeiro, Rio de Janeiro, Brazil
- Quarter: Downtown
- Coordinates: 22°54′24.054″S 43°10′50.177″W
- From: Rua da Assembleia
- To: Praça Tiradentes

Construction
- Inauguration: 1697

Rua da Carioca is a street in the center of Rio de Janeiro, Brazil. It starts at the junction of Rua da Assembleia and Rua Uruguaiana and runs until Praça Tiradentes.

== History ==
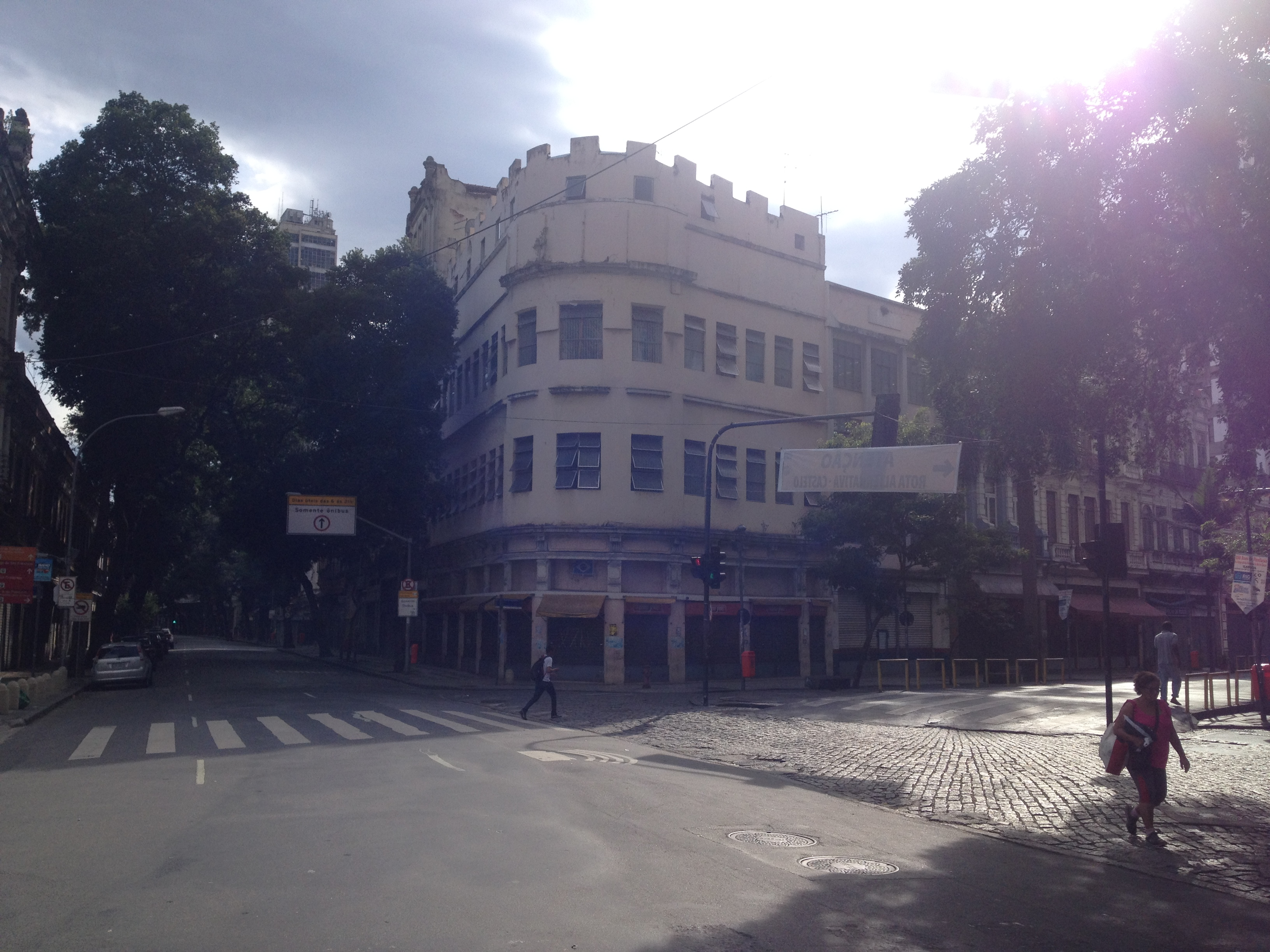
The beginning of Rua da Carioca at the intersection of Rua da Assembleia and Rua Uruguaiana (right).

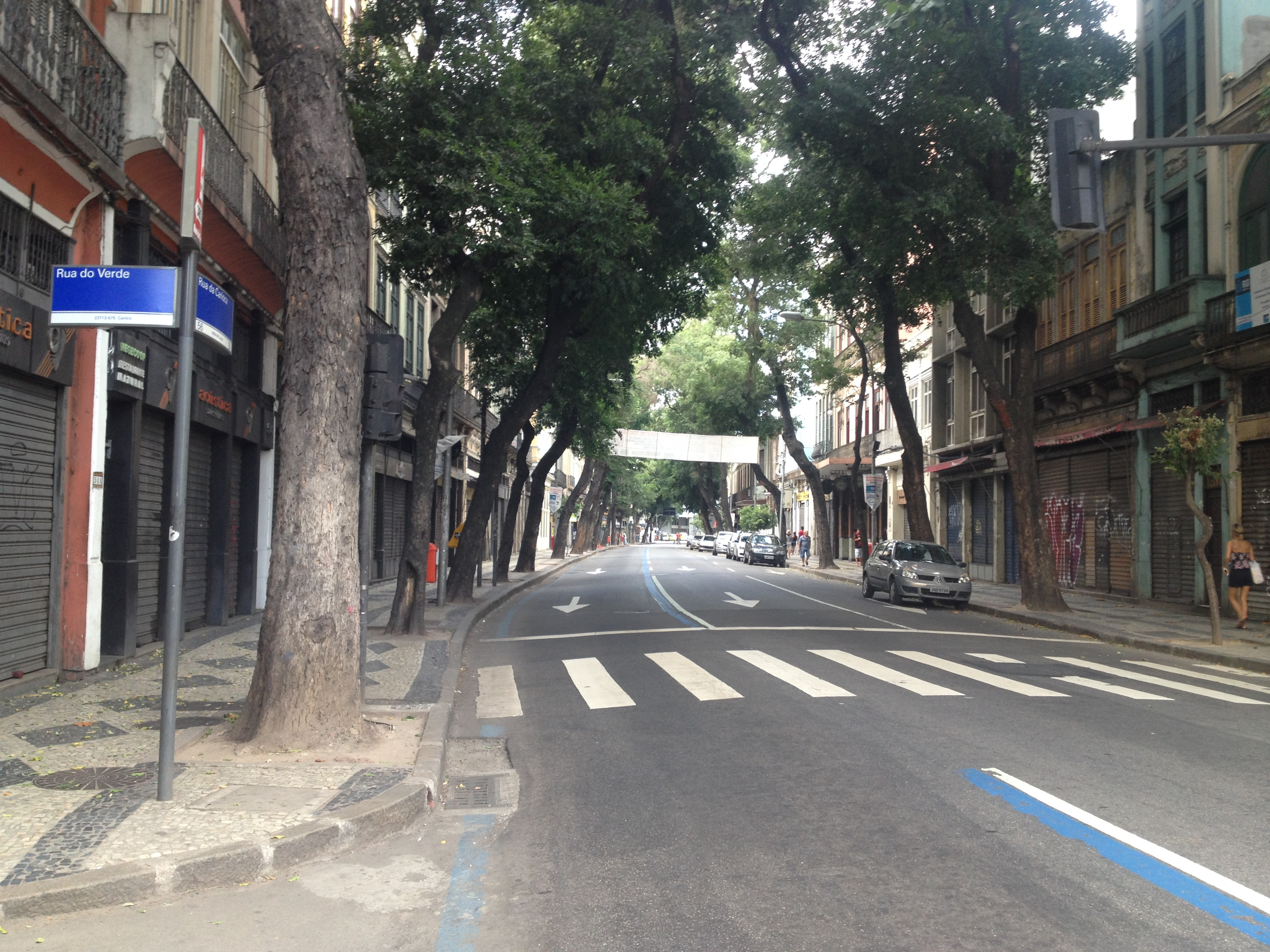
The end of Rua da Carioca. To the left, Rua do Verde.

Opened between 1697 and 1698, the street was initially named Rua do Egito (Egypt Street). This name may have originated from an oratory along the route depicting the Flight into Egypt of Mary, Joseph, and the infant Jesus to escape the Massacre of the Innocents ordered by Herod the Great. Another, more likely but unverified theory suggests the name referred to the street leading to the "Campo dos Ciganos" (Gypsies' Field), the former name of Praça Tiradentes. The street ran alongside the Morro de Santo Antônio, a property owned by the Franciscan friars. As a result, only the right side (even-numbered buildings) was initially developed due to a fence marking the boundary of the Franciscan property on the left side (odd-numbered buildings).

In 1741, the street was renamed Rua do Piolho (Louse Street) after the nickname of a local resident. The term "piolho" (louse) was slang for a solicitor of the time, referring to individuals who scoured archives and notary offices for legal matters from which they could profit.

This name persisted until 1848, when the Municipal Chamber of Rio de Janeiro officially designated it Rua da Carioca, formalizing its popular name. The street was commonly associated with the Carioca Fountain in the nearby Largo da Carioca, where locals fetched water, and the street served as a route to this fountain.

During the urban reforms led by Mayor Pereira Passos, the street was widened to its current 17-meter width, straightened, and lined with trees. It served as a vital link between the then-Avenida Central (now Avenida Rio Branco) and the northern parts of the city. This role diminished with the opening of Avenida Presidente Vargas.

Among the last remnants of the street's golden era are the Cine-Theatro Íris, a cinema founded in 1909 at number 51. In 2022, a traditional Bar Luiz, closed after 135 years of serving beer, draught beer and food. The street was also home to the final editorial office of O Pasquim, an influential Brazilian alternative weekly and who faced military dictatorship (1969–1991). At number 53, the legendary Zicartola restaurant, owned by samba composer Cartola and his wife Dona Zica, who ran the kitchen, operated on the second floor. The venue featured a performance space where prominent samba artists of the time performed, including the debut of Paulinho da Viola. Additionally, the Cine Ideal, located at numbers 60 and 62, ceased operations on February 15, 2014.

The architectural, historical, and cultural significance of Rua da Carioca led to its designation as a heritage site by the Instituto Estadual do Patrimônio Cultural (INEPAC). It was provisionally listed on July 4, 1983, and permanently protected on August 26, 1985. The Cine-Theatro Íris has its own separate heritage designation.

In 2012, the Secular Franciscan Order, which owned most of the rowhouses on the odd-numbered side, sold 19 properties (numbers 11 to 47, plus 53) to Banco Opportunity. In 2013, the city government designated Rua da Carioca a cultural site, permanently protecting nine buildings and preserving the street’s architectural ensemble. Banco Opportunity planned to develop a shopping center while preserving the protected facades.

In 2024, the Mayor Eduardo Paes (PSD), that Rua da Carioca is undergoing a major urban redevelopment project led by the city government. The initiative aims to transform the street into a vibrant craft beer hub, dubbed the "Beer Street." The project includes incentives for artisanal breweries to establish operations in the area, with plans for nine breweries to open. As of October 2024, the first brewery has opened, with a second expected by the end of the month. By March 2025, two additional breweries had been established, further enhancing the street's appeal as a destination for entertainment and leisure. This revitalization effort is part of a broader strategy to boost economic and cultural activity in the historic center of Rio de Janeiro.

== Gallery ==
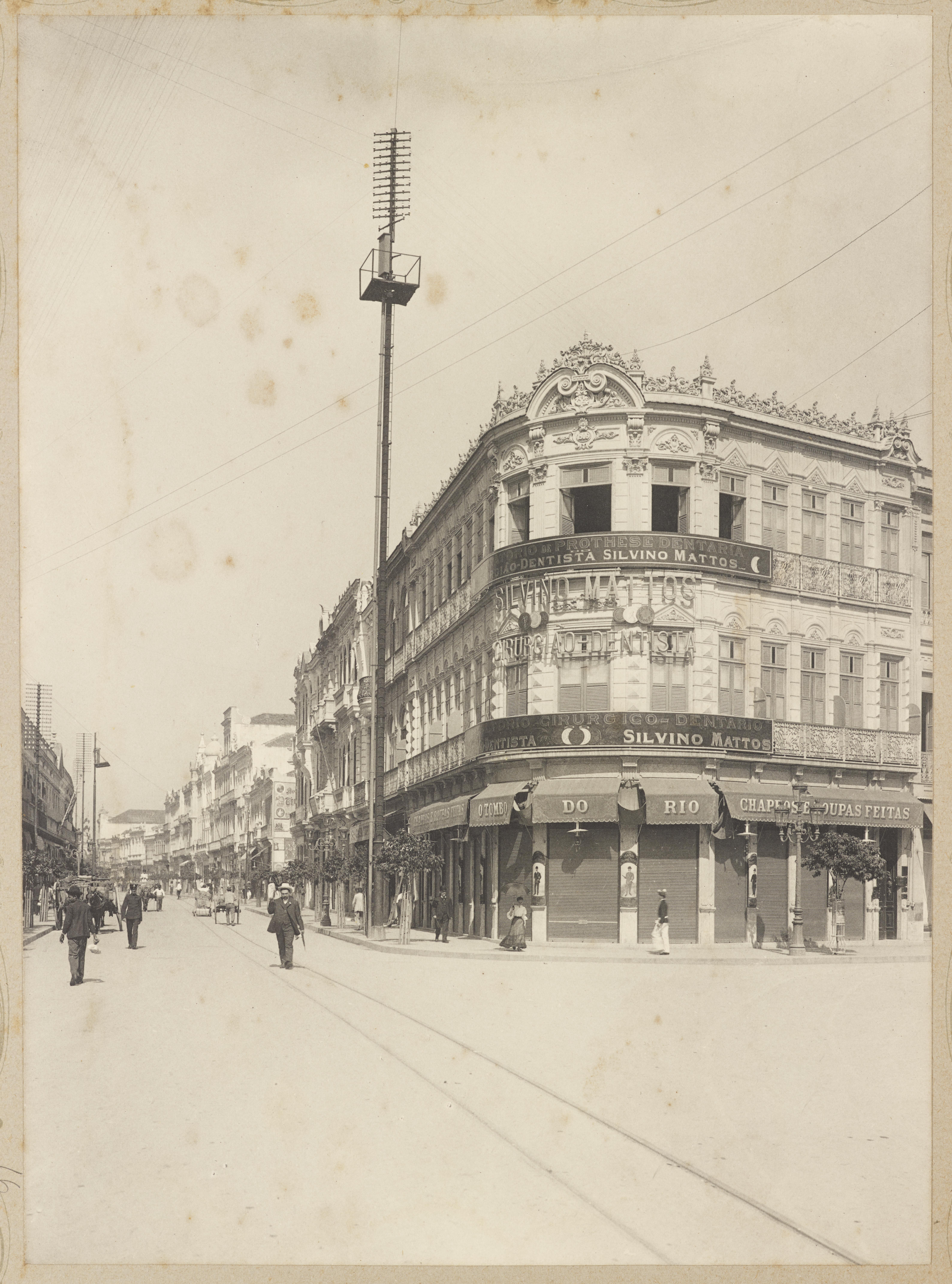
Rua do Piolho (circa 1898–1908)

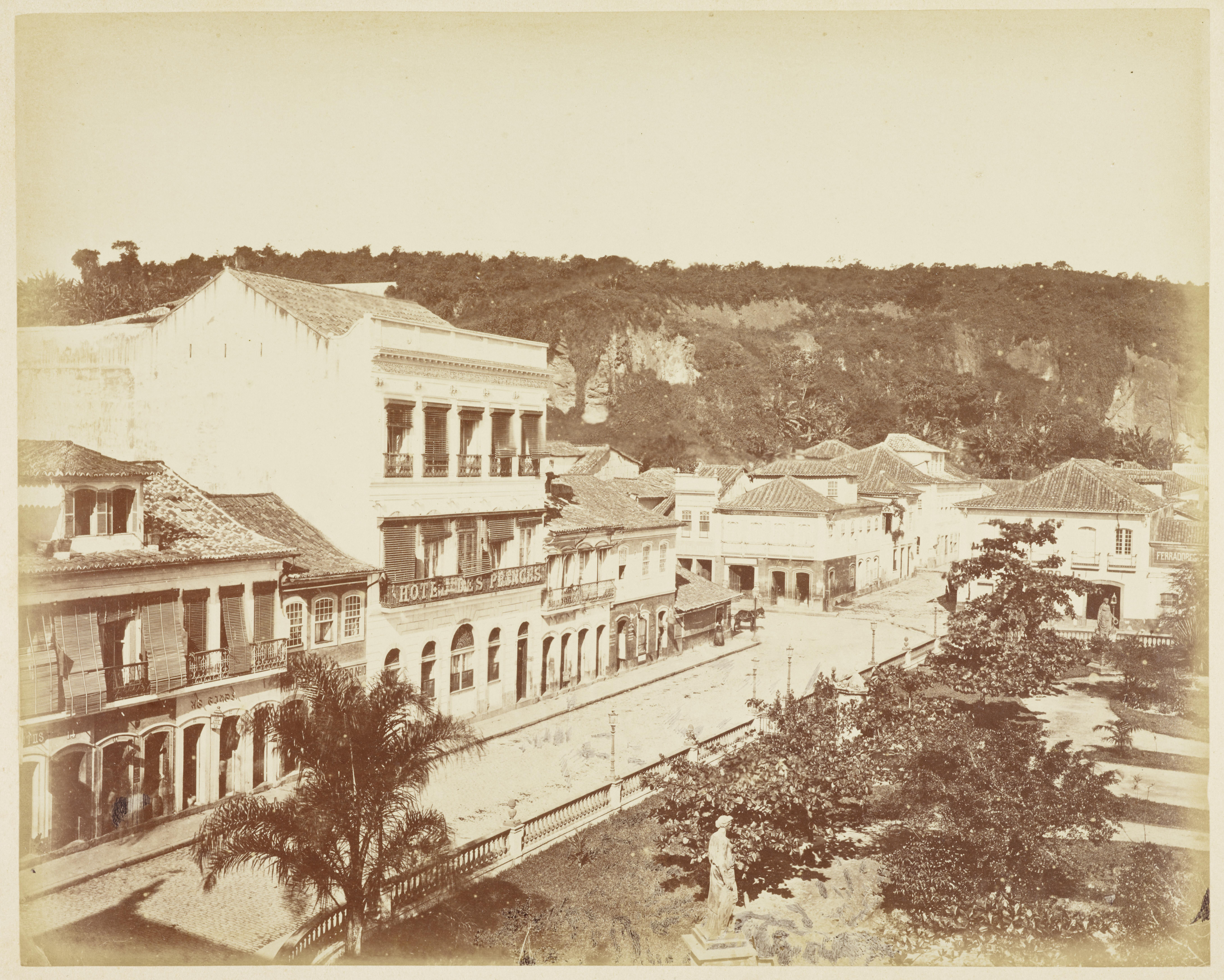
Rua do Piolho and Constitution Square, now Tiradentes Square (circa 1865–1875)

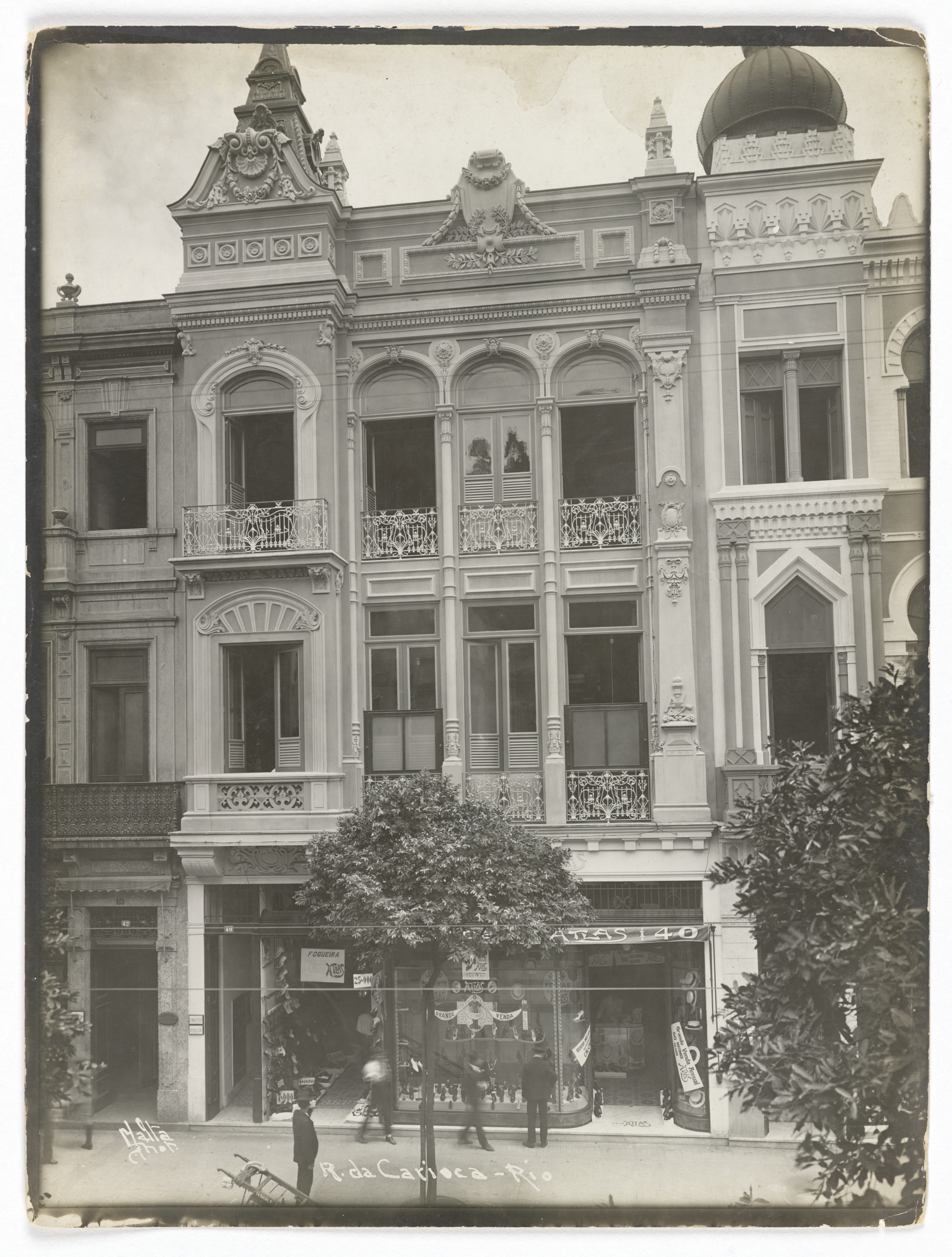
Casa Atlas shoe store, now defunct, already Carioca Street (circa 1910–1920)

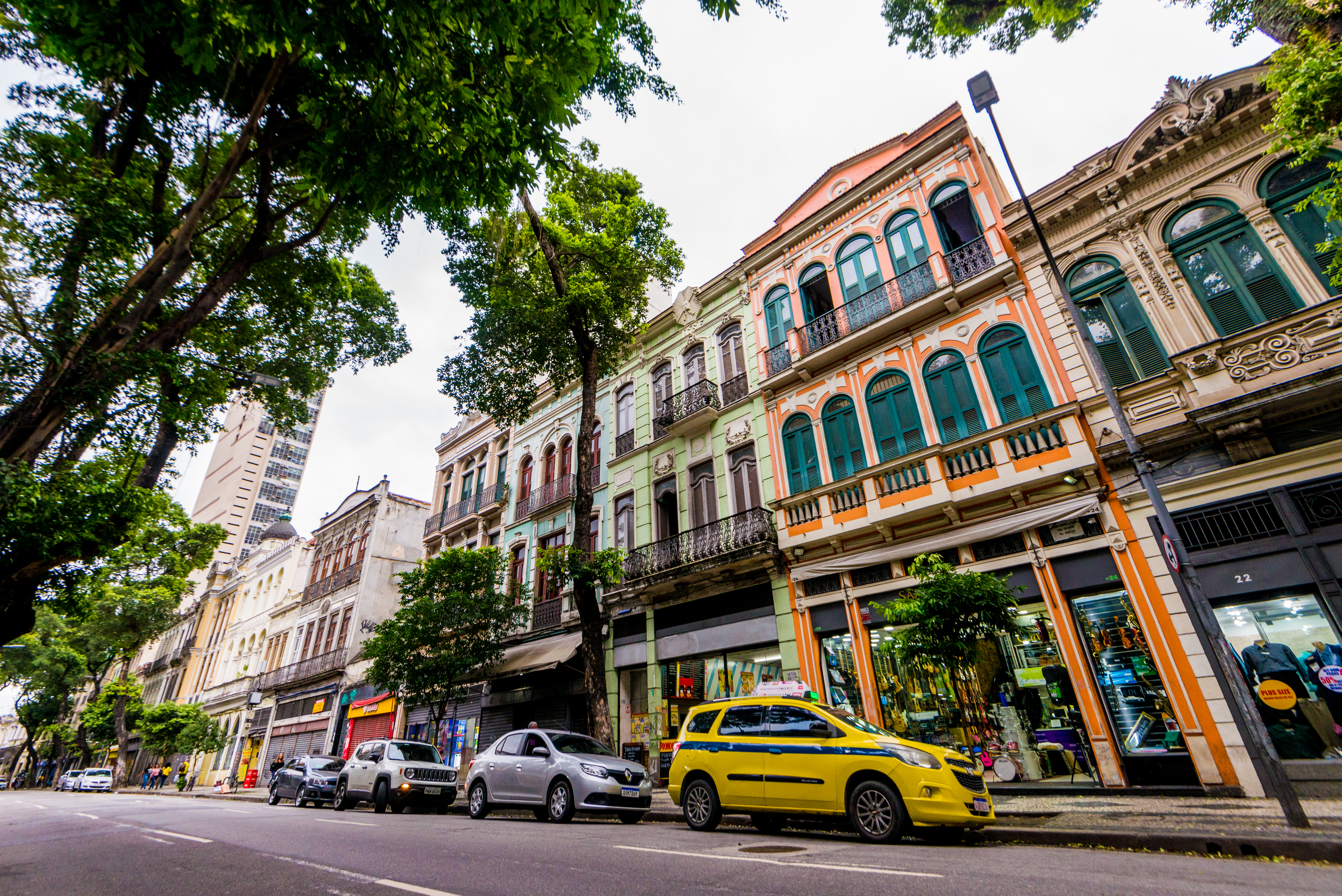
Carioca Street (2022). In the background, Tiradentes Square.

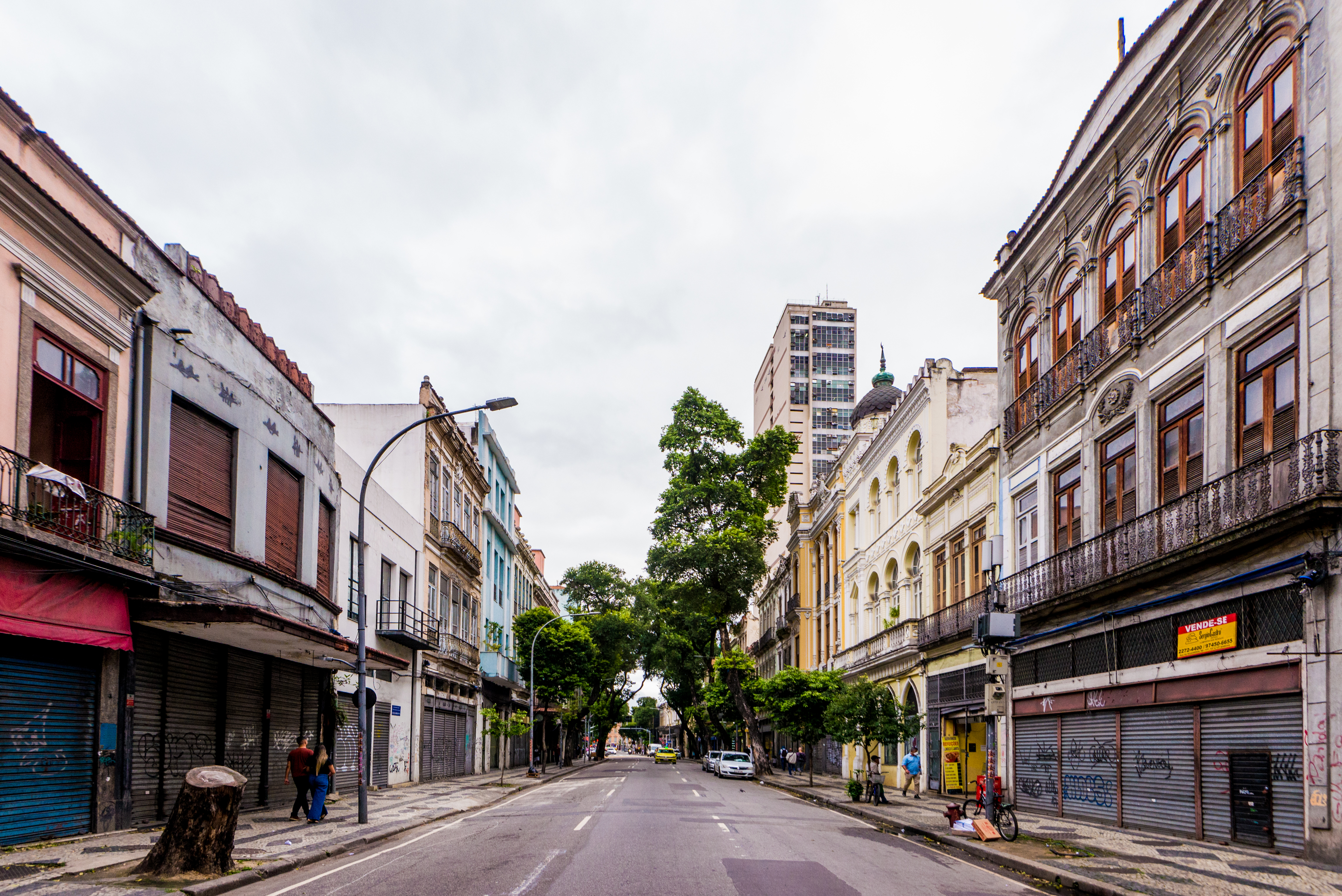
Carioca Street (2022). In the background, Tiradentes Square.
