= Praça Mauá =

Public square in Rio de Janeiro, Brazil

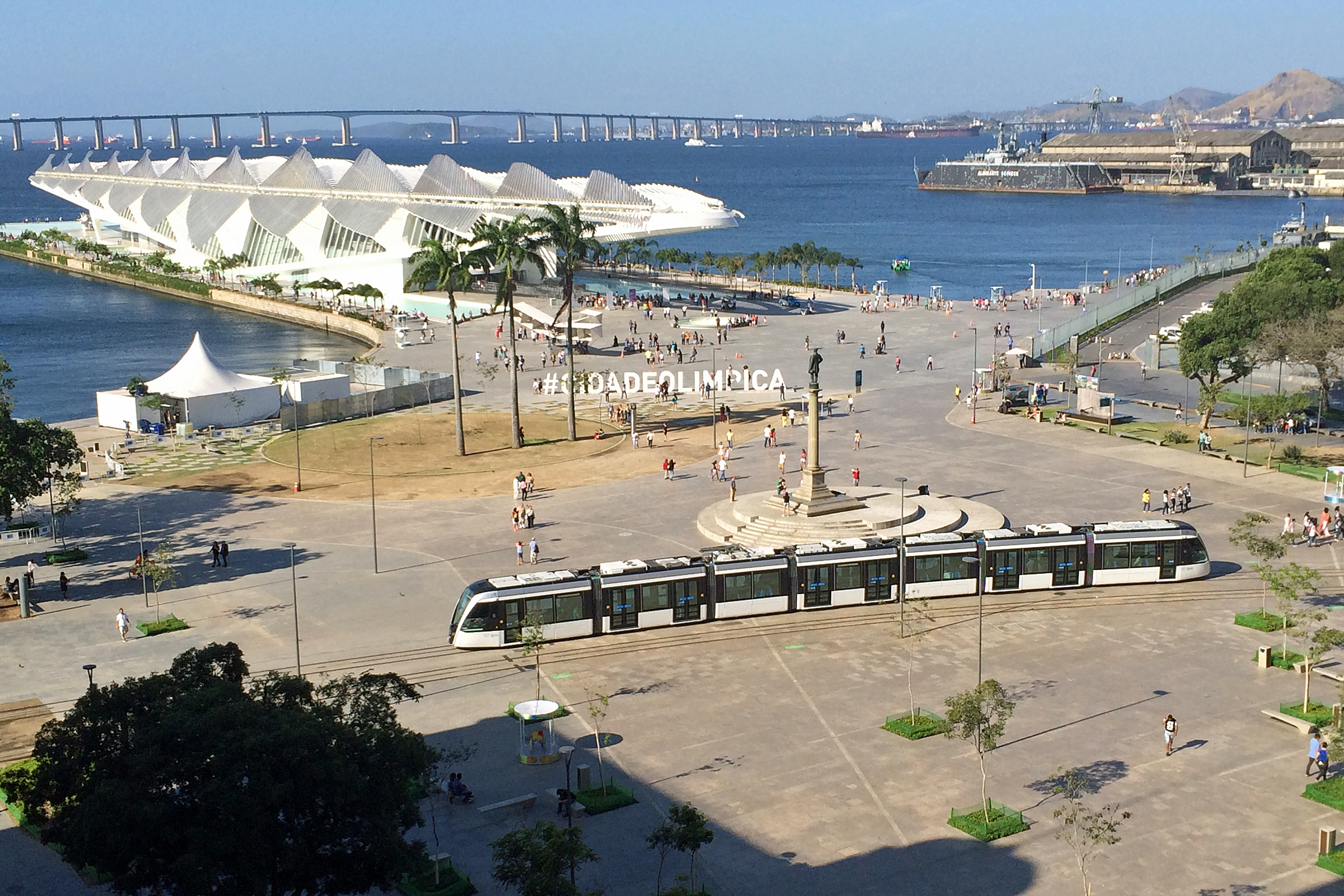
- Praça Mauá, with the statue of its namesake, the Viscount of Mauá, in the foreground, and the Museum of Tomorrow in the background.
- Interactive map of Praça Mauá
- Type: Urban park
- Location: Centro, Rio de Janeiro
- Coordinates: 22°53′46″S 43°10′50″W
- Area: 25,000 square metres (0.025 km^{2})
- Created: 1910
- Status: Open all year

Praça Mauá (English: Mauá Square) is a square situated in the Centro neighborhood of the Zona Central of Rio de Janeiro. With an area of 25,000 m^{2}, it is part of the Orla Conde, a public sidewalk that runs alongside Guanabara Bay.

The square was established in the beginning of the 20th century, later being reinaugurated on 6 September 2015 after being renovated. The revitalization of the square was made as part of Porto Maravilha, an urban renewal project that seeks to revitalize the Zona Portuária of Rio de Janeiro.

Praça Mauá marked the start of Avenida Rio Branco, as well as the Port of Rio de Janeiro, giving the numbering of the warehouses that begin at the square. The center of the square is occupied by a statue of Irineu Evangelista de Sousa, the Viscount of Mauá, a pioneer in various areas of the Brazilian economy. The Viscount of Mauá, which also gave the plaza its name, was responsible for the construction of the Mauá Railway, the first railway in Brazil, and for the creation of the Banco do Brasil, among other achievements. Built on top of a column, the sculpture is the work of Rodolfo Bernardelli and was inaugurated in 1910 at the initiative of the Clube de Engenharia.

== History ==
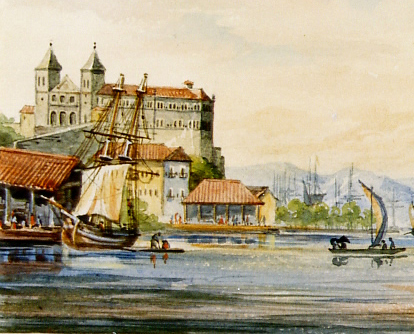
Portrait illustrating the Prainha region in 1841; at the bottom, São Bento Monastery.

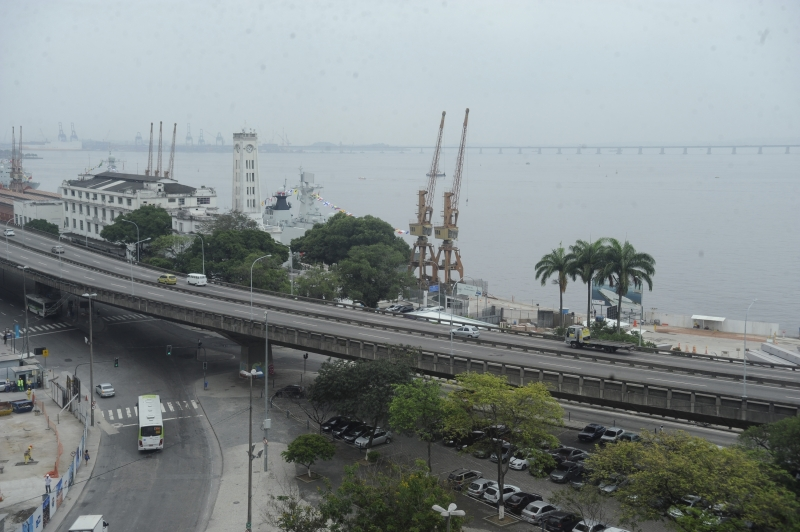
Elevado da Perimetral on top of Praça Mauá in 2013.

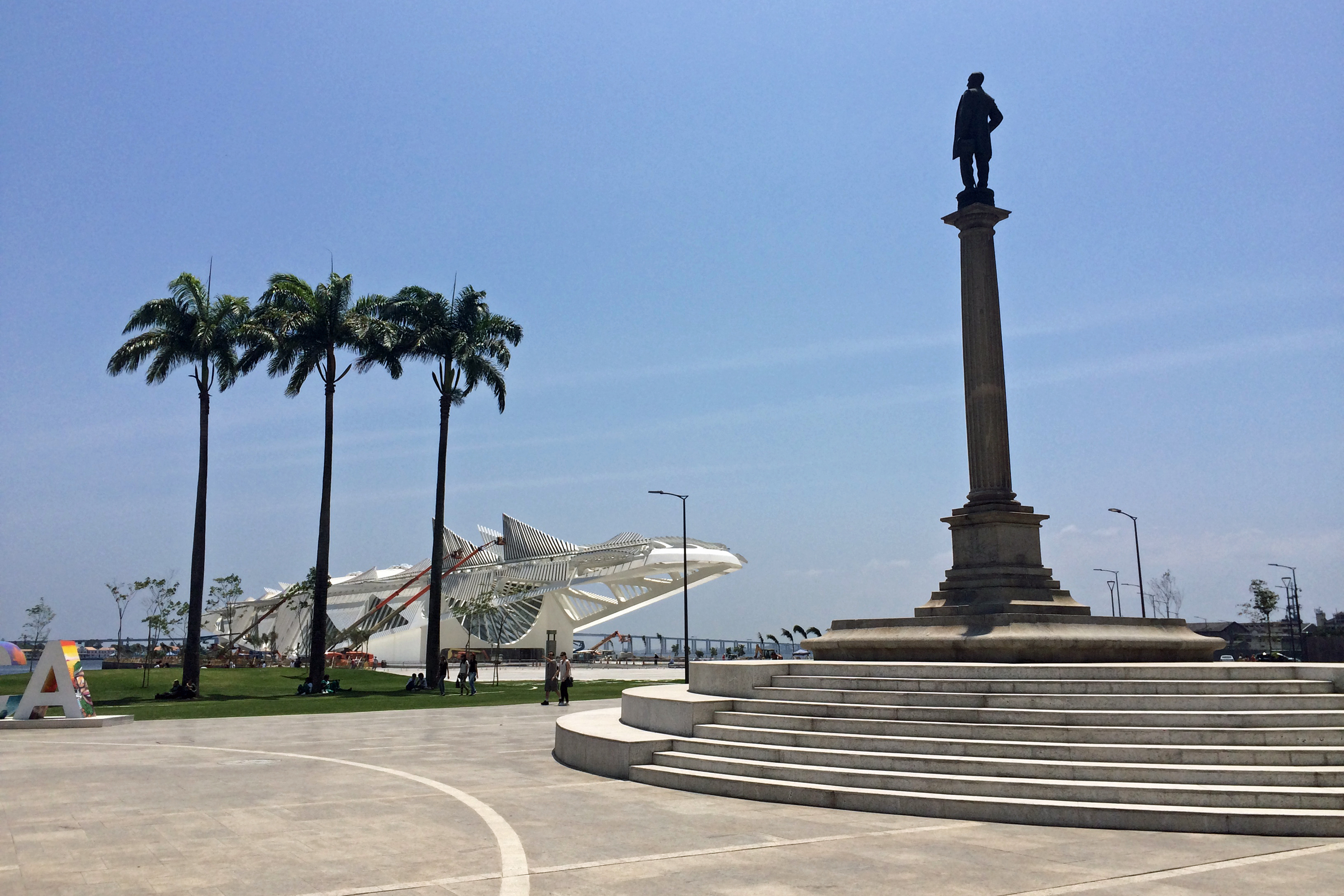
Praça Mauá after being renovated, through the Porto Maravilha project in 2016.

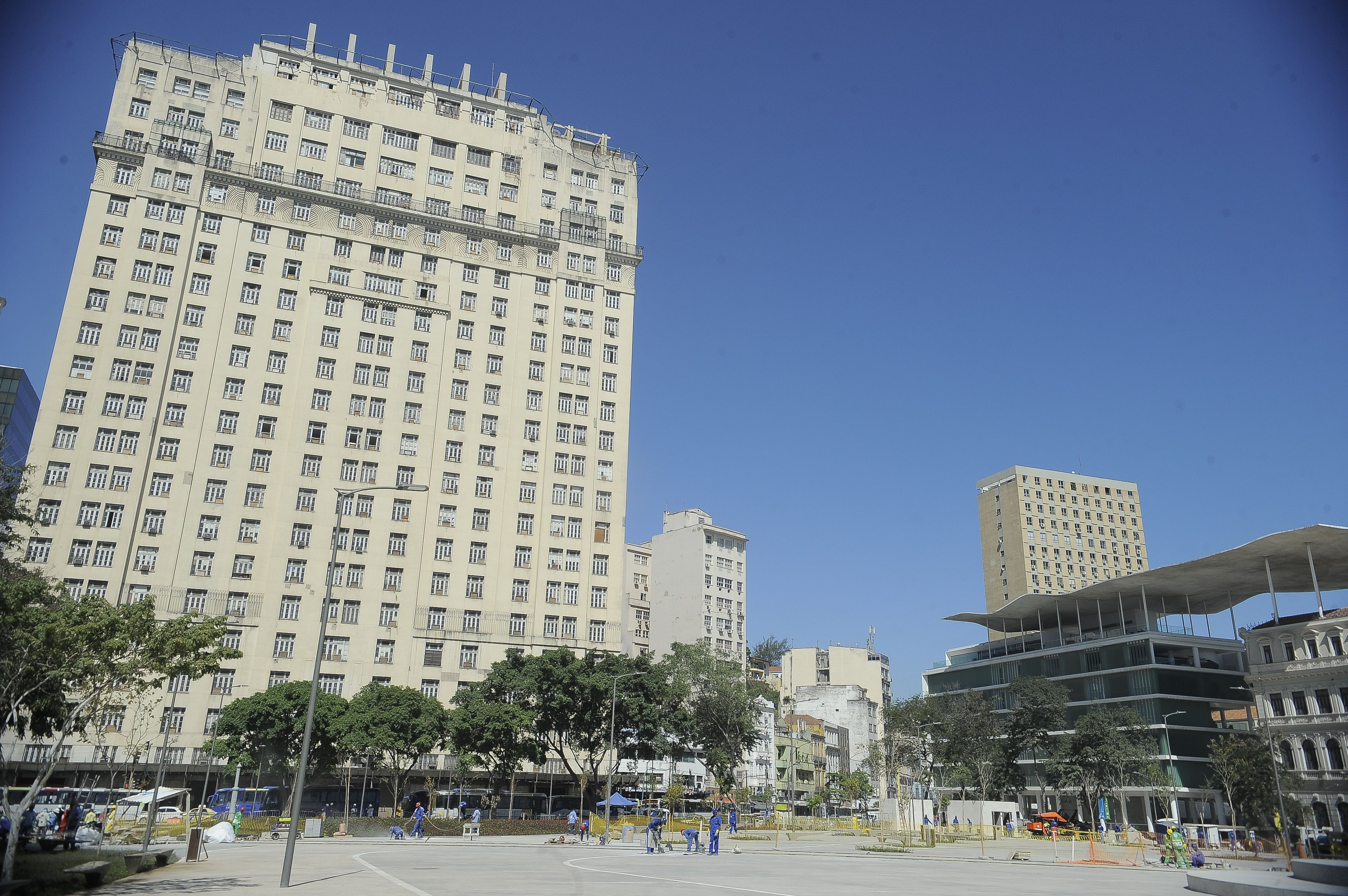
Joseph Gire Building, the old headquarters for the newspaper "A Noite"

=== 19th century ===
During the beginning of colonization, the Prainha, as the place was known before the establishment of the square, was surrounded by a small beach. In the 19th century, the place became known as Praça da Prainha. In 1871, the Municipal Chamber of Rio de Janeiro renamed the square Largo 28 de Setembro, the date the Rio Branco Law was passed, though the square was often referred to publicly by its prior name.

=== 20th century ===
Praça Mauá was built due to the necessity of a new, more structured wharf in order to receive larger shipments by virtue of the growth of commercial activities in Rio during the 20th century. The square was inaugurated in 1910, after 7 years of construction, succeeding the old Largo da Prainha. Praça Mauá was named as such to pay tribute to the Viscount of Mauá. As a symbol of this homage, a 8.5m statue of the Viscount was erected in 1910 in the middle of the square, designed by Rodolfo Bernadelli. Due to being located next to the disembarking point of passenger and merchant navy ships, the region developed various commercial activities linked to tourism and currency exchange, as well as bars, night clubs, and prostitution.

In 1930, the construction of the building for the newspaper "A Noite" (now called the Joseph Gire Building) was finalized in front of the square, and is today considered a prime example of architecture made with reinforced concrete in Brazil. The designer of the art deco project was Joseph Gire, a French architect who was also responsible for Copacabana Palace and for the base of Palácio Laranjeiras. The building has 22 stories and was one of the first buildings to start the trend of vertical design in the city's architecture, following trends in the United States versus those in Europe. The building, from 1936 to 2012, was the headquarters for the Rádio Nacional do Rio de Janeiro.

From the 1950s to the 1970s, the Elevado da Perimetral was built above the square, which was built to facilitate the flow of traffic from Zona Sul to other regions in Rio de Janeiro. The project, however, led to the acceleration of urban decline throughout the region.

In the 1990s, a building with post-modern architecture, the Rio Branco 1 Building (RB1), was built in front of the plaza. The RB1, inspired by post-modern designs in cities such as New York and Houston, is today a sophisticated business district.

=== 21st century ===
On 20 April 2014, a 300m stretch of the Elevado da Perimetral that passed above the square was torn down. The operation was done with 250 kg of explosives, tearing down 10,000 tons of concrete. The material fell onto the sand and tires put below the viaduct.

Through the Porto Maravilha project, the square went through revitalization projects between 2014 and 2015. Praça Mauá was reopen on 6 September 2015 after being closed for 4 years, with the reopening ceremony containing an extensive, free schedule of cultural events.

On 5 June 2016, the Rio de Janeiro Light Rail, a new mode of transport in Zona Central, came online. As part of the system, the Parada dos Museus stop, located in front of the Museu de Arte do Rio, was opened as well. Some of the rail lines of the light rail cross through the square.

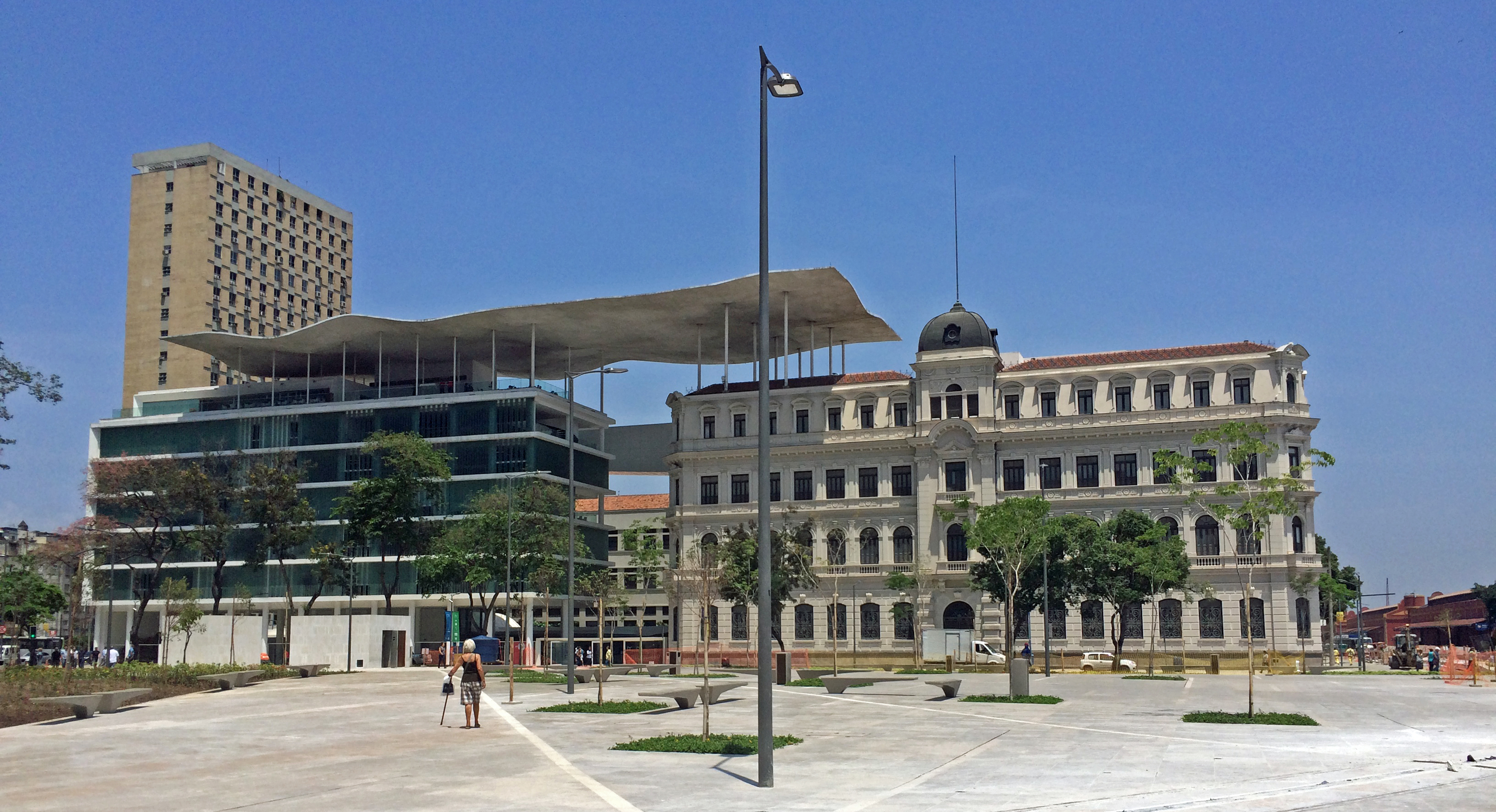
Museu de Arte do Rio (MAR)

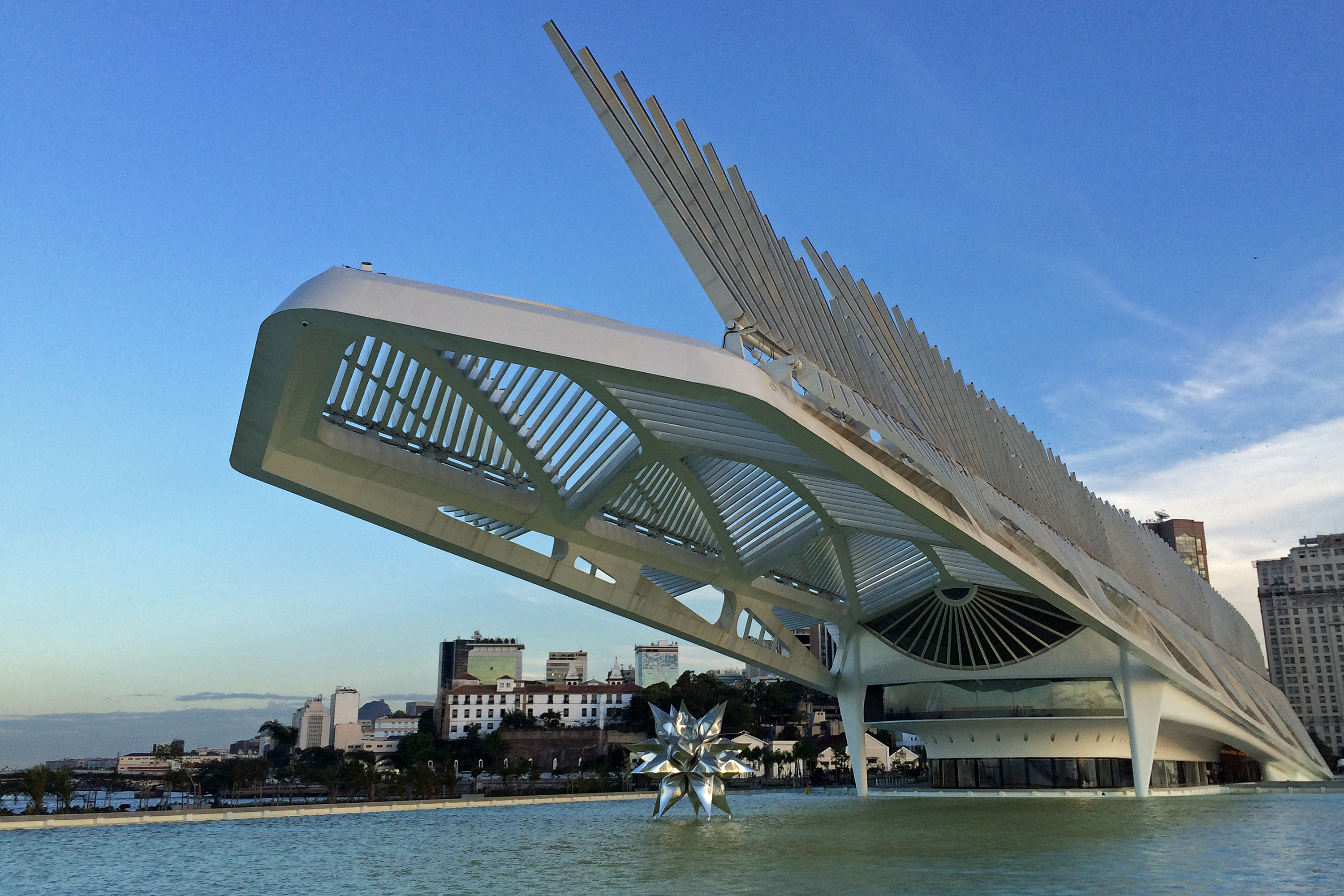
Museum of Tomorrow.

== Points of interest ==
The following points of interested are situated around Praça Mauá:

- 1.º Distrito Naval - Instituted in 1933, its premise is to contribute to the carrying out of the obligations of the Brazilian Navy in its jurisdiction in the district, that being the states of Espírito Santo and Rio de Janeiro, along with parts of Minas Gerais.
- Joseph Gire Building - Inaugurated at the end of the 1920s, it was the first building made with reinforced concrete in Brazil. With 22 stories and 102m tall, it was the headquarters of A Noite, Rádio Nacional, and the Instituto Nacional da Propriedade Industrial (INPI).
- Rio Branco 1 Building (RB1) - Also known as the Centro Empresarial Internacional Rio, the RB1 is a large business center. The building, with 33 stories, includes a basement, ground floor, 9-floor garage, a convention center, 18 floors of office space, mechanic space, and penthouses.
- Museu de Arte do Rio (MAR) - The Museu de Arte do Rio is composed of two buildings with different but interlinked designs: Palacete Dom João VI, opened in 1916 to shelter the Port Inspector; and a modernist building from the 1940s that functioned as a police station, hospital, and bus station.
- Museum of Tomorrow - Situated on Píer Mauá, an area adjacent to the square, the Museum of Tomorrow is one of the most prominent points of the revitalization project. Devised by Spanish architect Santiago Calatrava, the museum is a symbol of the revitalization of the Zona Portuária of Rio de Janeiro.
- Parada dos Museus - Opened in 2016, its one of the stops on Line 1 of the Rio de Janeiro Light Rail Carioca.
- Píer Mauá - Opened in 1953, it is where the Museum of Tomorrow is.
- Regional Superintendent of the Federal Police.

== See also ==
- Centro, Rio de Janeiro
- Irineu Evangelista de Sousa, Viscount of Mauá
