= Zona Central, Rio de Janeiro =

Coordinates: 22°54′19.4112″S 43°10′37.66″W

Central Region, Rio de Janeiro Zona Central
- Zone
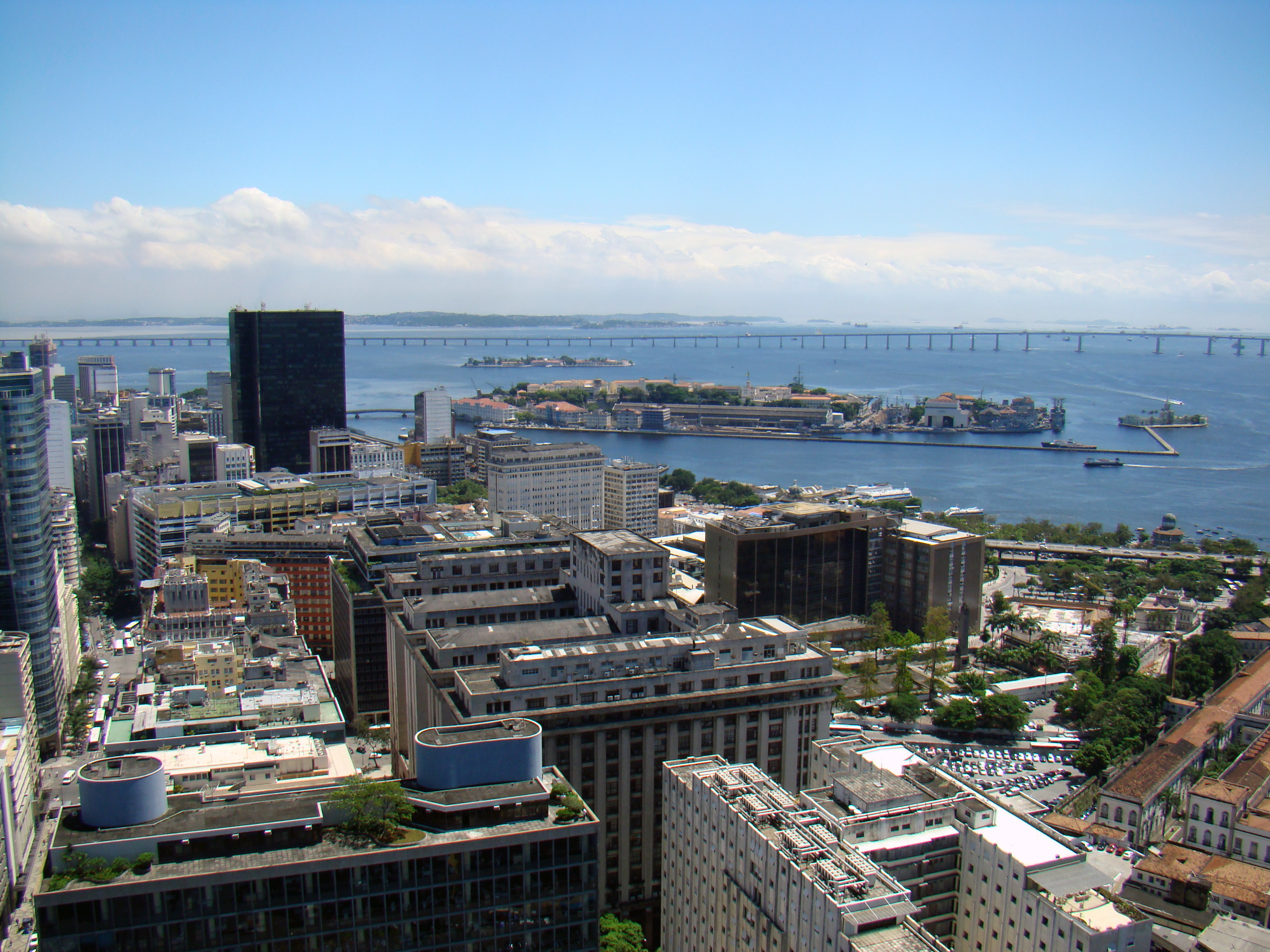
- A view from Centro

- Location in Rio de Janeiro Central Region, Rio de Janeiro (Brazil)
- Country: Brazil
- State: Rio de Janeiro (RJ)
- Municipality/City: Rio de Janeiro

Zona Central (Central Region) is a geographical area that is the historical, administrative, commercial, and financial centre of the city of Rio de Janeiro and of the State of Rio de Janeiro, Brazil. It is one of the four zones of the municipality and is administered by a subprefecture, the subprefecture of Centro and Centro Histórico. The subprefecture administers the administrative regions of Portuária, Centro, Rio Comprido, São Cristóvão, Ilha de Paquetá and Santa Teresa, and includes all their neighborhoods, which are: Gamboa, Centro, Lapa, Saúde, Cidade Nova, Santa Teresa, Estácio, Catumbi, Santo Cristo, Paquetá and Glória. Other neighborhoods are also included in the subprefecture, although they belong to the North Zone, such as: Caju, Benfica, Vasco da Gama, São Cristóvão, Mangueira, Rio Comprido and Praça da Bandeira. The limits of the Central Zone are: Catete, Flamengo and Laranjeiras in the South Zone; Alto da Boa Vista, Cidade Universitária, Maracanã, Praça da Bandeira, Vila Isabel, Caju and Tijuca in the North Zone. Since 2009, the region has been undergoing revitalization by the public authorities through programs such as Choque de Ordem, Porto Maravilha and Morar Carioca. In 2023, the neighborhood of Glória, which previously formed part of the city's South Zone, became one of the neighborhoods of the Central Zone through a decree signed by the municipal government.

It has been undergoing a major revitalisation since it was rediscovered by locals in the 1990s.

== Subprefecture ==
The Subprefecture of Centro and Centro Histórico is one of the seven subprefectures into which the municipality of Rio de Janeiro is sub-administered, and it is responsible for administering the administrative regions of Portuária, Centro, Rio Comprido, São Cristóvão, Ilha de Paquetá and Santa Teresa. It acts as an intermediary between the population of the entire area and the municipal government of Rio de Janeiro. It is also responsible for developing urban order for residents and visitors and for revitalizing the region under its jurisdiction.

== Neighbourhoods ==
- Bairro de Fátima
- Castelo
- Centro
- Catumbi
- Cidade Nova
- Estácio
- Gamboa
- Lapa
- Santa Teresa
- Santo Cristo
- Saúde

== Transportation ==
The city's main train station, Central do Brasil (which provides connections to the SuperVia regional rail system), is located in the Estacio district. The area also contains the terminus for the Santa Teresa Tram at Estação Carioca. Other important modes of transport that connect to Zona Central are:

- Rio Metro
- VLT (light rail/tram)
- Buses

The area also contains the Santos Dumont Airport, one of two major airports in the Rio area.

The Central Zone is the core of the Rio de Janeiro metropolis, that is, it polarizes the entire metropolitan area. It contains the largest concentration of job opportunities in the Greater Rio region, which makes the area the main pole attracting workers from all parts of this metropolitan agglomeration. To serve residents of this region who travel daily toward the metropolitan core, mainly for work, the Central Zone has a large number of urban routes—both municipal and intermunicipal—of buses, trains, metro and ferries that directly connect this part of the capital to almost all neighborhoods of the South, North and West zones of the municipality of Rio, and to a large part of the neighborhoods of the municipalities of Duque de Caxias, São João de Meriti, Belford Roxo, Nilópolis, Mesquita, Nova Iguaçu, Queimados, Japeri, Paracambi, Seropédica, Itaguaí, Magé, Guapimirim, Niterói, São Gonçalo, Itaboraí, Tanguá, Maricá and Rio Bonito (in addition to vans and intercity bus lines that travel from downtown Rio to metropolitan municipalities farther from the core, such as Cachoeiras de Macacu and Mangaratiba), which shapes urban mobility and thus keeps the municipalities of the Rio de Janeiro metropolitan agglomeration strongly linked to its main centrality.

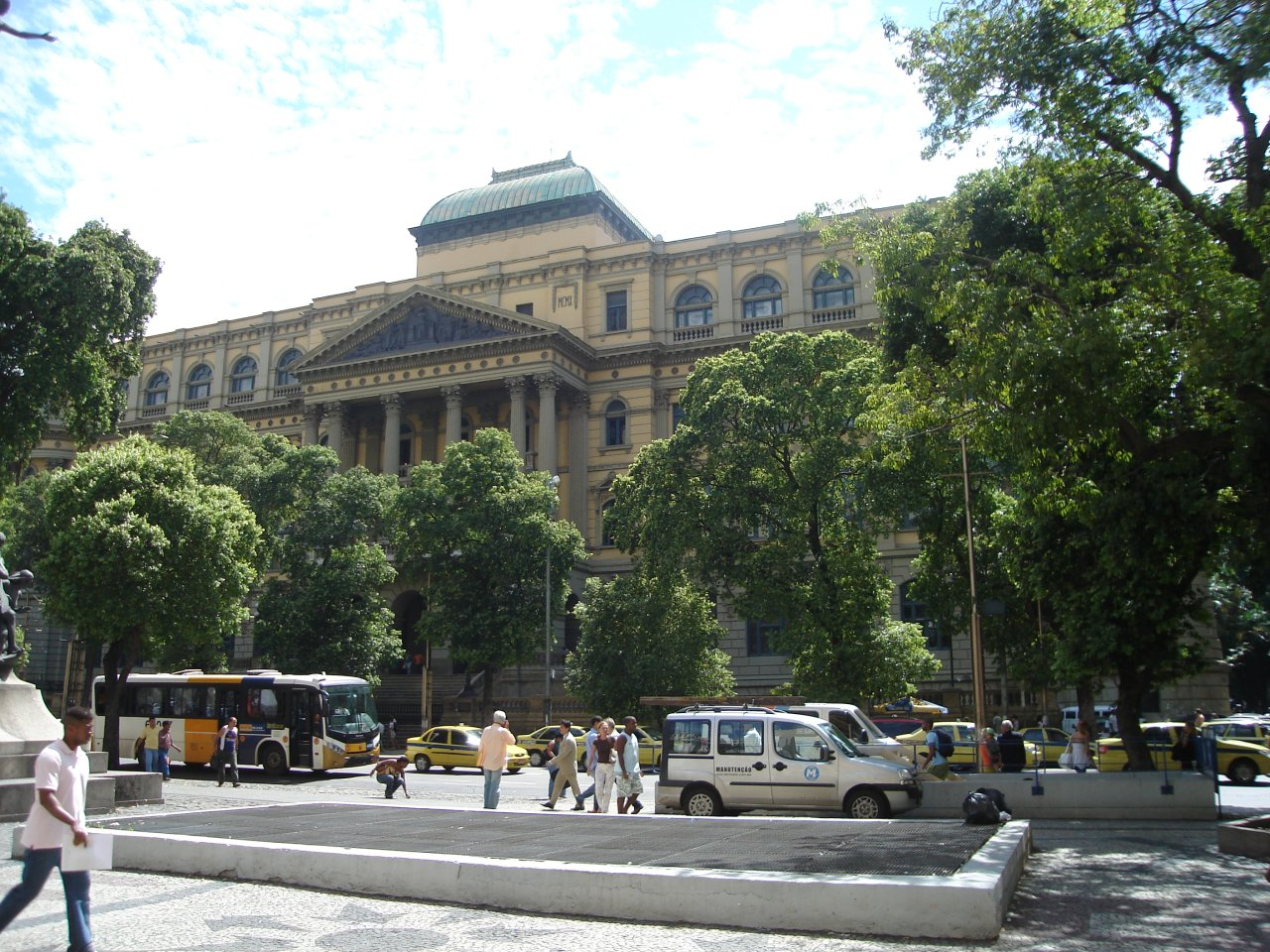
Praça Marechal Floriano: in the background, the National Library

Road

Other expressways were constructed locally from the 2010s onward, such as the Via Binário do Porto on the surface and the Porto Expressway underground. Both cross all port-area neighborhoods of the region, replacing the functions of the former Elevado da Perimetral, demolished between 2013 and 2014.

Rail

Regarding rail transport, the region contains Central do Brasil station, operated by the private public transport company SuperVia, connecting it to the North Zone, the West Zone and other municipalities of the Rio de Janeiro metropolitan area. Currently in operation is the VLT Carioca, which serves exclusively the central neighborhoods, though with six short future lines planned for implementation. Among the neighborhoods of the Central Zone, the system does not serve only the neighborhoods of Catumbi, Cidade Nova and Estácio. It is planned to extend it to nearby neighborhoods in the North Zone, except for Rio Comprido. The system was inaugurated in 2016 and has expanded gradually. The neighborhood of Santa Teresa is the only one in the municipality that still uses the tram as a means of transport: it was withdrawn from service in 2011 but received a newer model in 2015.

== Tourism ==
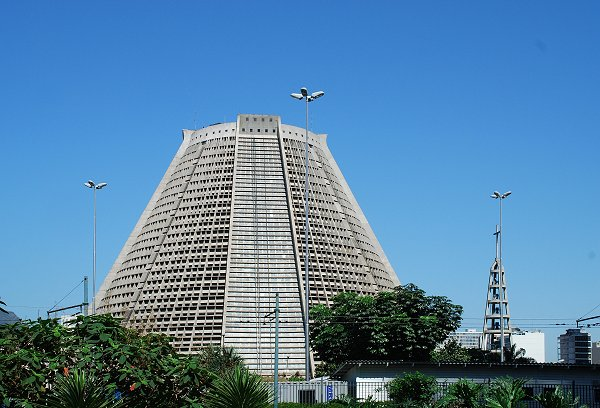
The Metropolitan Cathedral of Saint Sebastian, seat of the Archdiocesan Museum of Sacred Art.

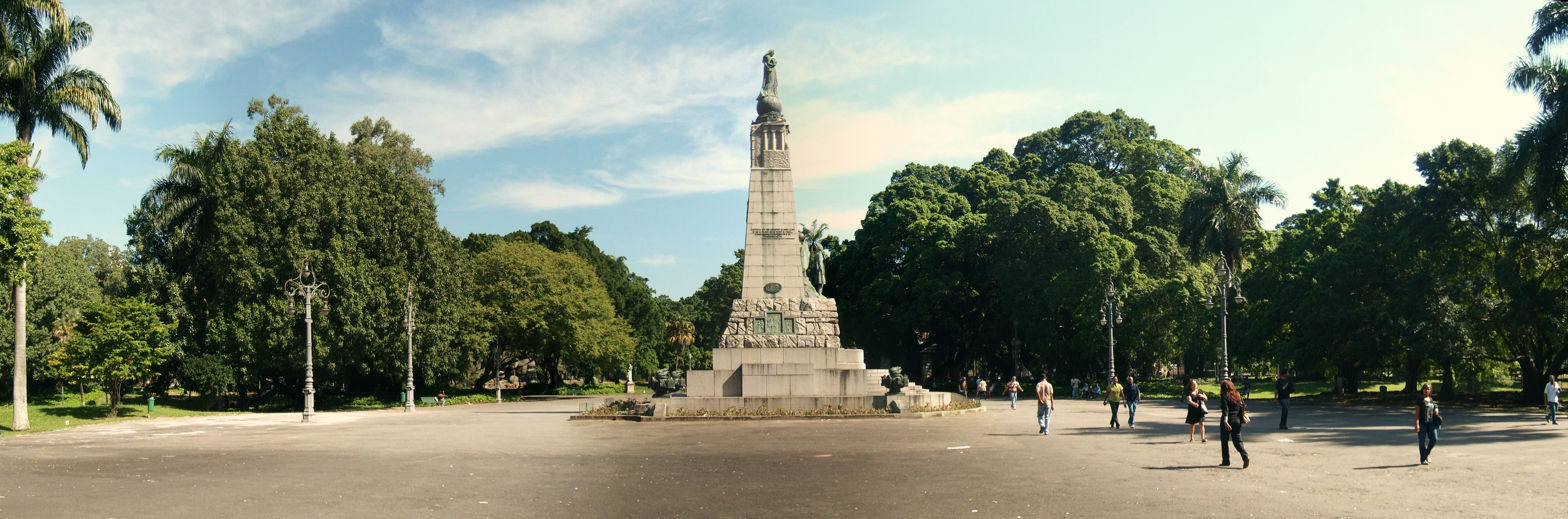
The traditional Campo de Santana, at Praça da República

Inhabited by Indigenous peoples since remote times and settled by Portuguese, enslaved Africans and their descendants since the 16th century, the region has more tourist attractions than the other six subprefectures of the municipality. Among its main tourist attractions are the Carioca Aqueduct, the Brazilian Academy of Letters, the Carioca Academy of Magistracy, the National Library of Brazil, the Metropolitan Cathedral of Saint Sebastian, the Dom João VI Bath House, the Camelódromo, the Correios Cultural Center, the Centro Cultural Banco do Brasil, the Centro Luiz Gonzaga de Tradições Nordestinas, the Cidade do Samba Joãosinho Trinta, the Cinema Odeon, the Central do Brasil metro and train station, the Estádio Vasco da Gama, the Palácio Gustavo Capanema, Ilha Fiscal, the Jardim Suspenso do Valongo, the Largo da Candelária, Largo da Carioca, the Memorial Getúlio Vargas, the Monument to the Dead of the Second World War, the Praça XV Market, the National Museum of Fine Arts, the Museu Militar Conde de Linhares, the National Historical Museum, the Museum of Astronomy, the Civil Police Museum, the Museum of the First Reign, the Museu de Arte do Rio, the Museum of Modern Art, the Paço Imperial, the Palácio de São Cristóvão, Praça Mauá, the Municipal Sambadrome, the Solar do Marquês do Lavradio, the Municipal Theatre and the Real Gabinete Português de Leitura.
