= Museu de Arte do Rio =

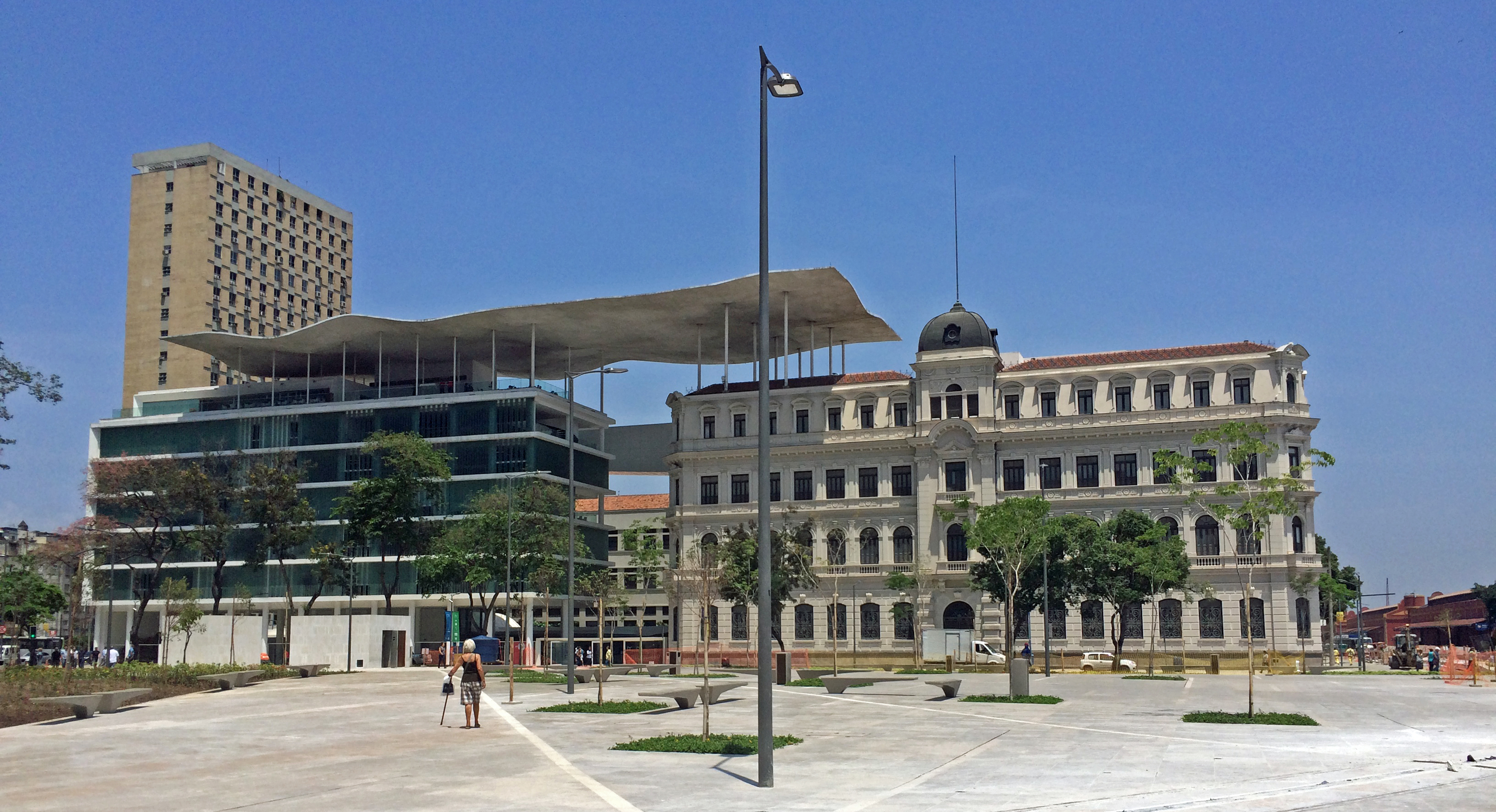
- Established: March 1, 2013; 13 years ago
- Location: Rio de Janeiro, Brazil
- Coordinates: 22°53′48″S 43°10′55″W
- Type: Art
- Director: Raphael Callou
- Curator: Marcelo Campos
- Website: http://www.museudeartedorio.org.br/

Museu de Arte do Rio (MAR) (English: Art Museum of Rio) is an art museum in Rio de Janeiro which was inaugurated on 1 March 2013. It is maintained by a partnership between municipal public institutions and private initiatives.

The museum is part of a project to revitalize downtown Rio de Janeiro which began in 2009 through a municipal law that intended to invest up to R$8 billion real in the years following its passage.

The initiative is between local government and the Fundação Roberto Marinho, and does activities that involve fundraising, registering, research, preservation, and the creation of cultural goods to the community. The entire architectural plan was organized by Jacobsen Arquitetura, with ideas made by three main architects: Paulo Jacobsen, Bernardo Jacobsen, and Thiago Bernardes. The primary goal of the project was to establish a flow system where everything would function in an integrated and efficient manner, together with the creation of the Escola do Olhar, an arts and culture development space.

== The museum ==
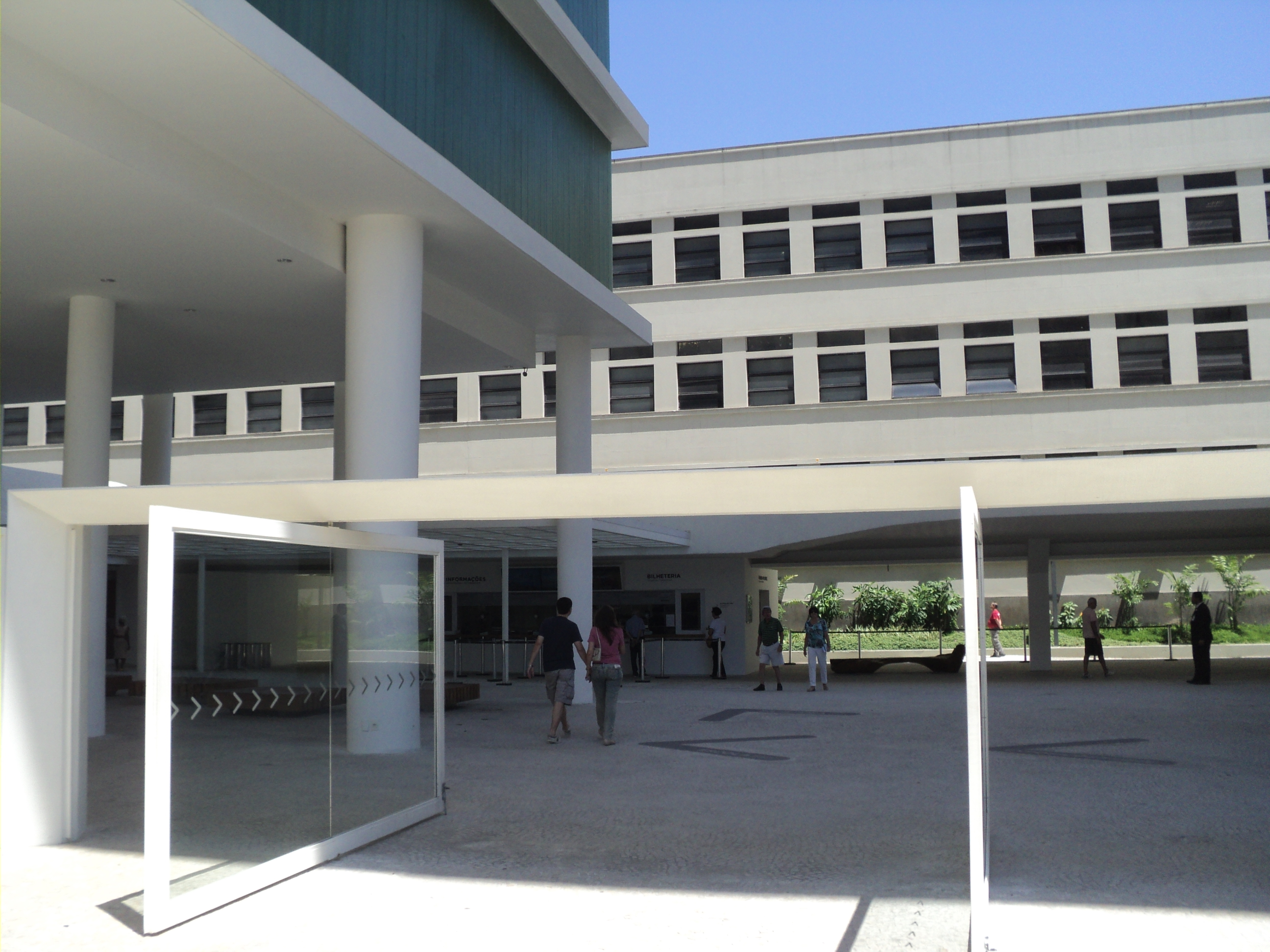
The entrance to the Museu de Arte do Rio.

Located in the Centro district of Rio de Janeiro, it is next to Avenida Rio Branco. It is located in the historic downtown and occupies two buildings at Praça Mauá, between Centro and the Zona Portuária.

A project devised in partnership with the Fundação Roberto Marinho, the museum is a partnership between municipal, state and federal governments, with the support of the Federal Ministry of Culture, and seeks to promote a valorization of the history of the city.

One of the buildings is the Palacete Dom João VI, constructed with an eclectic style. It was dedicated to exposition rooms, dubbed the "Pavilhão de Exposições", and took advantage of a high level of space between the pavement and building, as well as the freeform structure of the rooms. The other, adjacent to the palace, was used as the Mariano Procópio bus station prior to being integrated into the museum, the "Escola do Olhar", along with housing the administrative offices and other departments.

The two buildings are connected by a suspended catwalk, a "fluid cover", which occupies a total area of 2,300 square meters and a constructed area of 11,240 m².

=== Inauguration ===
With the presence of many governmental representatives from all levels of government, the space was inaugurated on 1 March 2013, despite some areas still being in progress. At the time, the governor of the state of Rio de Janeiro, Sérgio Cabral, estimated that the construction of the museum cost R$76 million. Along with this, during the Museum's opening, Cabral announced that all of the records of the Bank of the State of Rio de Janeiro (Banerj) would be moved to the museum.

=== Architectural prize ===
The museum was awarded, in the year of its inauguration in 2013, the best construction project of the year in the museum category for the Architizer A+ Awards. The Museu de Arte do Rio competed with the Heydar Aliyev Center, New Rijksmuseum, the Zhujiajiao Museum of Humanities & Arts, and the Danish Maritime Museum.

== See also ==
- Praça Mauá
- Orla Conde
