= Zona Central =

Zona Central can refer to:

- Zona Central, Chile
- Zona Central, Rio de Janeiro, Brazil
- Downtown São Paulo, Brazil
