= Castelo =

Castelo may refer to:

== Places ==
=== Brazil ===
- Castelo, Espírito Santo, a municipality in the State of Espírito Santo
- Castelo (Rio de Janeiro), a neighbourhood in the city of Rio de Janeiro

=== Portugal ===
- Castelo (Lisbon), a civil parish in the municipality of Lisbon
- Castelo (Moimenta da Beira), a civil parish in the municipality of Moimenta da Beira
- Castelo (Sertã), a civil parish in the municipality of Sertã
- Castelo (Sesimbra), a civil parish in the municipality of Sesimbra
- Santa Maria do Castelo e São Miguel (Torres Vedras), a civil parish in the municipality of Torres Vedras
- Castelo do Neiva (Viana do Castelo), a civil parish in the municipality of Viana do Castelo

== Other ==
- Castelo Futebol Clube, a Brazilian football (soccer) club
