= Igreja de Santa Rita de Cássia (Rio de Janeiro) =

- Santuário Arquidiocesano de Santa Rita
- Igreja de Santa Rita de Cássia
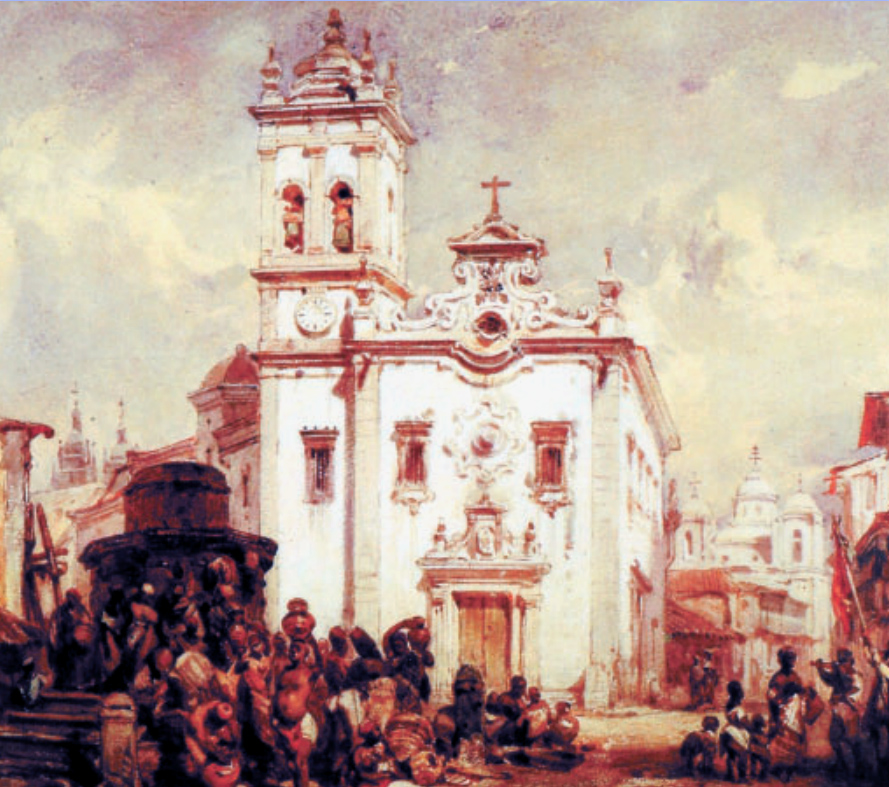
- Façade of the Igreja de Santa Rita de Cássia

- Location in Rio de Janeiro
- 22.9004°S 43.1807°W
- Location: Centro, Rio de Janeiro
- Address: Largo de Santa Rita, s/n, Centro, Rio de Janeiro, Rio de Janeiro
- Country: Brazil
- Language: Portuguese
- Denomination: Roman Catholic
- Website: santuariodesantarita.org.br

History
- Status: Archdiocesan Shrine
- Founded: 1718
- Founder(s): Manoel Nascentes Pinto and Antonia Maria
- Dedication: Saint Rita of Cascia
- Events: Elevated to Archdiocesan Shrine on March 22, 2025

Architecture
- Functional status: Active
- Heritage designation: Listed by National Institute of Historic and Artistic Heritage
- Designated: 1938
- Architectural type: Church
- Style: Rococo, Baroque
- Years built: 1719–1728
- Groundbreaking: 1719
- Completed: 1728

Administration
- Archdiocese: Archdiocese of Rio de Janeiro
- Parish: Rita of Cascia

Clergy
- Archbishop: Orani João Tempesta
- Priest: João Pereira de Araújo e Azevedo (first perpetual parish priest)

Igreja de Santa Rita de Cássia it is a Catholic temple of historical and artistic importance in the city of Rio de Janeiro, Brazil, listed by National Institute of Historic and Artistic Heritage (IPHAN) in 1938.

== History ==
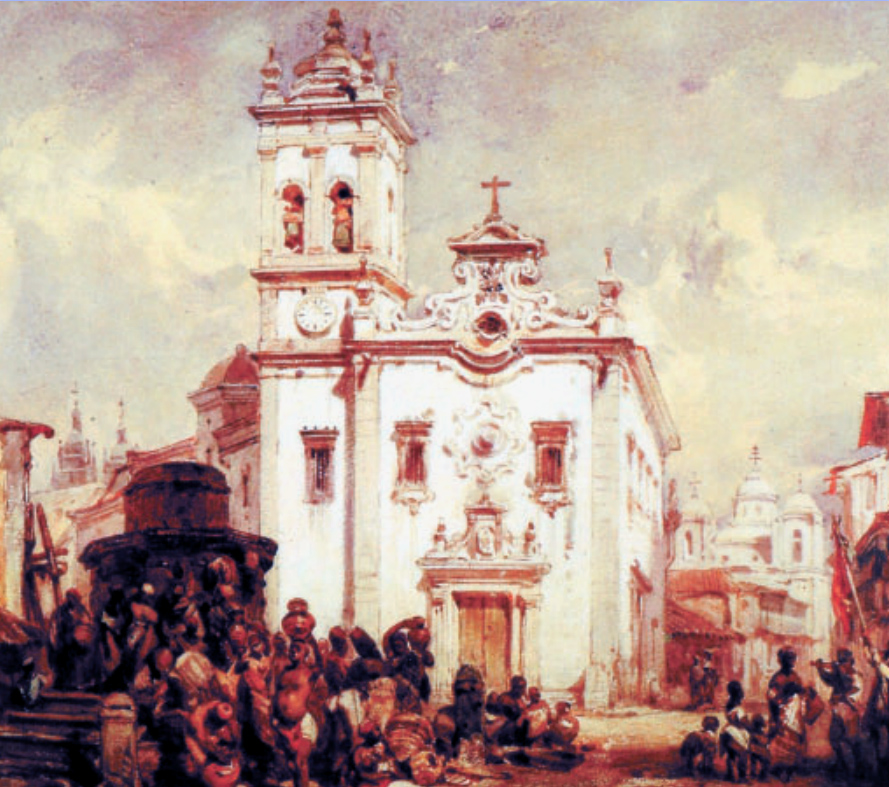
Igreja de Santa Rita de Cássia, Rio de Janeiro

The church was founded by Manoel Nascentes Pinto and his wife Antonia Maria, owners of an oil painting depicting the Italian mystic. As popular devotion to Saint Rita grew, and her domestic cult was opened to the public, they decided to acquire a carved image to be the patron saint of the future chapel. This image remained in the church of Nossa Senhora da Candelária until the chapel was ready.

The land for the church was purchased in 1718, the cornerstone was laid in 1719, and in 1721 the couple donated the chancel, sacristy, and consistory to the bishopric, in addition to items donated by the Pinto couple. However, they demanded patronage privileges over the church, which led to a dispute with the diocese, only resolved in 1741, when Dom Manoel's son, Ignacio Nascentes Pinto, withdrew the claim. In the meantime, the family kept the church for themselves, as a private chapel. The nave was completed in 1728, as recorded on the façade.

The former Sisterhood of Saint Rita, established at the time of the donation, was transformed into the Sisterhood of the Blessed Sacrament of Saint Rita when the temple was elevated to the status of parish church for the area that was then a suburb of the city of Rio de Janeiro.

The territory of the parish of Santa Rita, which is now slightly smaller, comprised the neighborhood of Vila Verde (northern part of the city center), the hills of São Bento and Conceição, and the coves of Valongo and Gamboa. Due to its location, the parish was responsible for the pastoral care of the port area and, consequently, of the African captives traded there.

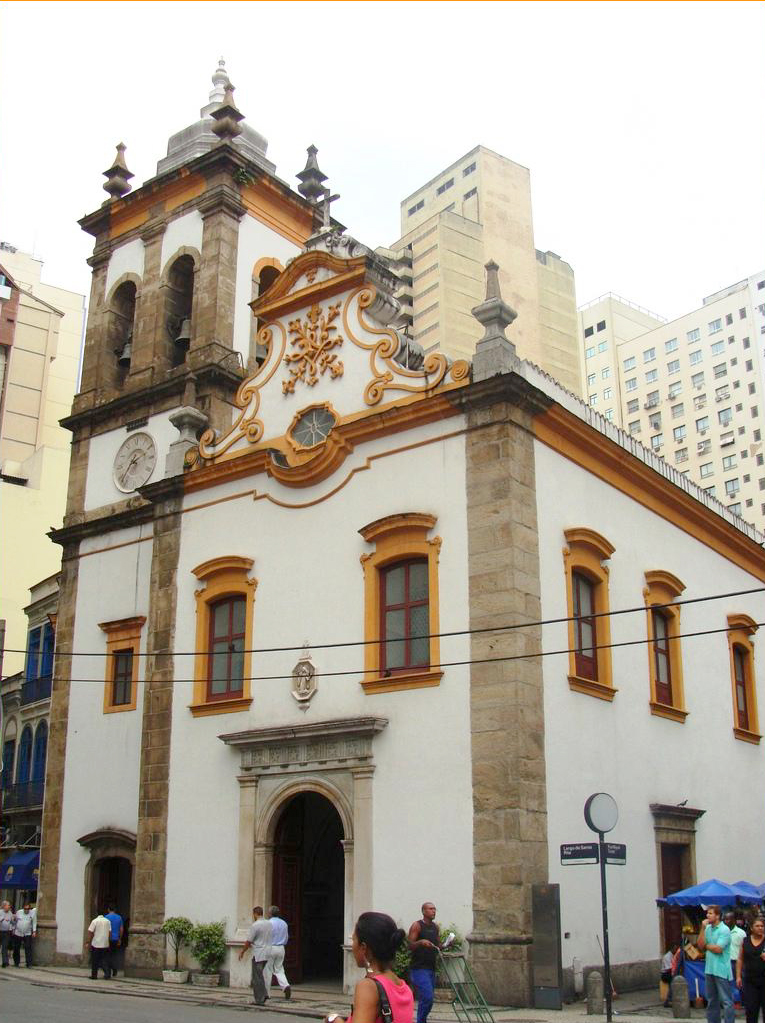
Current appearance of the church

The parish was established on the following dates: parish seat by provision of January 9, 1749; separation from the territory of Nossa Senhora da Candelária on January 29, 1751; establishment as a vicariate on May 5, 1753; and presentation of the first perpetual parish priest, João Pereira de Araújo e Azevedo, on the 29th of the same month.

Between 1753 and 1759, the pediment, the spire of the tower, and all the interior carvings were redone, taking on a Rococo style, the first manifestation of this style in the Americas, almost simultaneous with its emergence in France.

In 1763, the Brotherhood of the Blessed Sacrament acquired a plot of land with houses behind the church to build larger facilities for the consistory and sacristy, as well as to make room for the creation of another brotherhood, that of St. Michael and Souls. In 1870, the carved frontispiece was replaced by a simple arch.

The urban reforms carried out by Mayor Pereira Passos in the early 20th century did not affect the church, although they remodeled its surroundings with the demolition of a block and the opening of Avenida Mal. Floriano, a symbol of Rio's Belle Époque.

In 2021, Saint Rita of Cascia was proclaimed patron saint of downtown Rio de Janeiro. Four years later, in the Jubilee Year of 2025, the Cardinal Archbishop of Rio de Janeiro, D. Orani João Tempesta, decreed the elevation of the parish church of Saint Rita to the status of Archdiocesan Shrine, presiding over the installation Mass on March 22.

== Architectural features ==
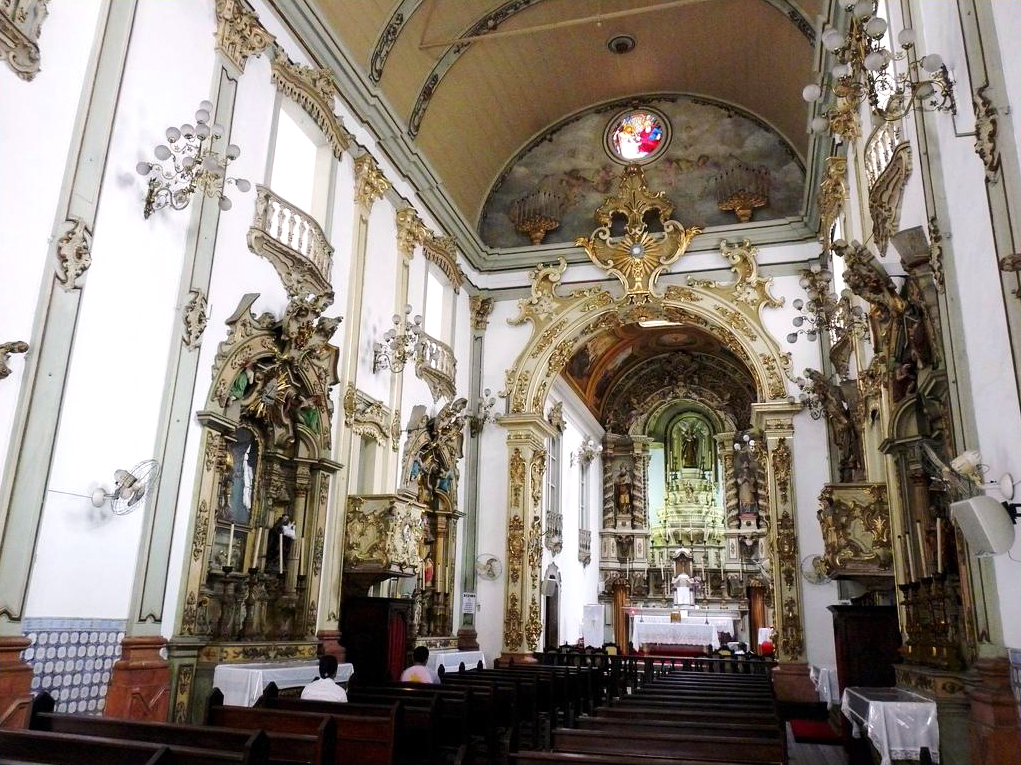
Inside the church

In its current condition, the church has a relatively sober façade, consisting of a rectangle with a round-arched door and two windows on the upper floor, crowned by segmental arches. Above the door, where there used to be a rich decorative frontispiece, today there is only a medallion with an image of the patron saint. The pediment preserves its Rococo form, with an oculus and volutes, topped by a cross and flanked by pinnacles. Next to the body of the church stands a bell tower, with a door at the base, a window above, and above these elements a clock and arches for the bells. The spire has a bulbous shape, with four pinnacles at the corners.

Inside, it has a single nave, an elongated chancel, and a sacristy on the left side. Four side altars complete the ensemble, displaying antique 17th-century statuary. The nave, with a vaulted ceiling, also has two carved pulpits, tribunes, tile panels, and a choir. The presence of an oculus above the transept arch and a skylight in the ceiling of the chancel are unusual details in 18th-century Brazilian churches. Its carvings are rich and elegant, and it is one of the few that survived intact the later renovations that altered the decoration of countless Baroque-Rococo temples in Brazil. The main altarpiece still preserves Baroque features, having been partly reused from the original decoration. The model of its altarpieces inspired the decoration of other churches in Rio de Janeiro, such as Nossa Senhora da Glória do Outeiro, Nossa Senhora da Lapa dos Mercadores, and Santa Cruz dos Militares. The ceiling of the chancel features an early 20th-century painting illustrating the miracles of Saint Rita.

== The Cemeteries of New Blacks ==
It is presumed that, from 1741 onwards, after the Nascentes Pinto family definitively handed over the then chapel of Santa Rita to the bishopric, the temple began to bury the pretos novos, that is, the captives who had recently arrived from Africa continent and died before being sold. As there was no more space in the churchyard, burials began to be carried out in Largo de Santa Rita, causing complaints because it was a public square and not a suitable place for burials.

In 1774, by order of Viceroy Marquess of Lavradio, wholesale trade was transferred from within the city of Rio de Janeiro to the Valongo region, a suburb belonging to the same parish of Santa Rita. As a result, the slave trade and its respective cemetery also moved there. The new Pretos Novos do Valongo Cemetery operated on Rua Pedro Ernesto (formerly Rua do Cemitério) until 1830, when the official slave trade was abolished.

The old Pretos Novos Cemetery in Santa Rita was forgotten for a long time, but the passage of the Carioca light rail vehicle through Largo de Santa Rita in 2018 sparked controversy among social movements regarding archaeological research in the region. As a substitute for the necessary remembrance of those buried there, National Institute of Historic and Artistic Heritage (IPHAN) proposed the representation of black roses on the floor of the cemetery, which continues to serve as a public square. The political contradictions of the episode, the unreasonableness of the arguments put forward, and the strangeness of the invisibility of the Santa Rita Cemetery did not receive a satisfactory response from either academia or public institutions.
