= Castelo, Rio de Janeiro =

Area of the Centro neighborhood in Rio de Janeiro, Brazil

Coordinates: 22°54′32″S 43°10′21″W

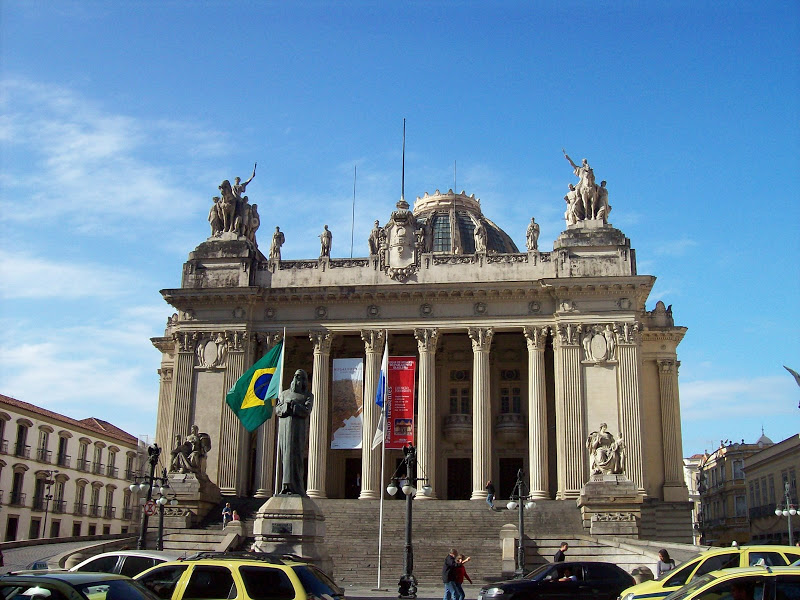
Tiradentes Palace is located in Castelo.

Castelo is a region in Rio de Janeiro, Brazil, but not officially recognized as a neighborhood, and officially forms part of the Centro neighborhood. It is generally considered to be located in the region between Avenida Rio Branco, the Santos Dumont Airport and Praça Quinze de Novembro. The area derives its name from the former Morro do Castelo in that location, which was demolished by water jets in the 1920s. As most of the buildings in the area were designed and built in the first half of the twentieth century, after the demolition of Morro do Castelo (Castle Hill) in 1921, the region became home to a large collection of Art Deco buildings. Art Deco was the prevalent architectural style in Rio de Janeiro at that time.
