= Theatro Municipal (Rio de Janeiro) =

Coordinates: 22°54′33.20″S 43°10′35.37″W

- Theatro Municipal do Rio de Janeiro
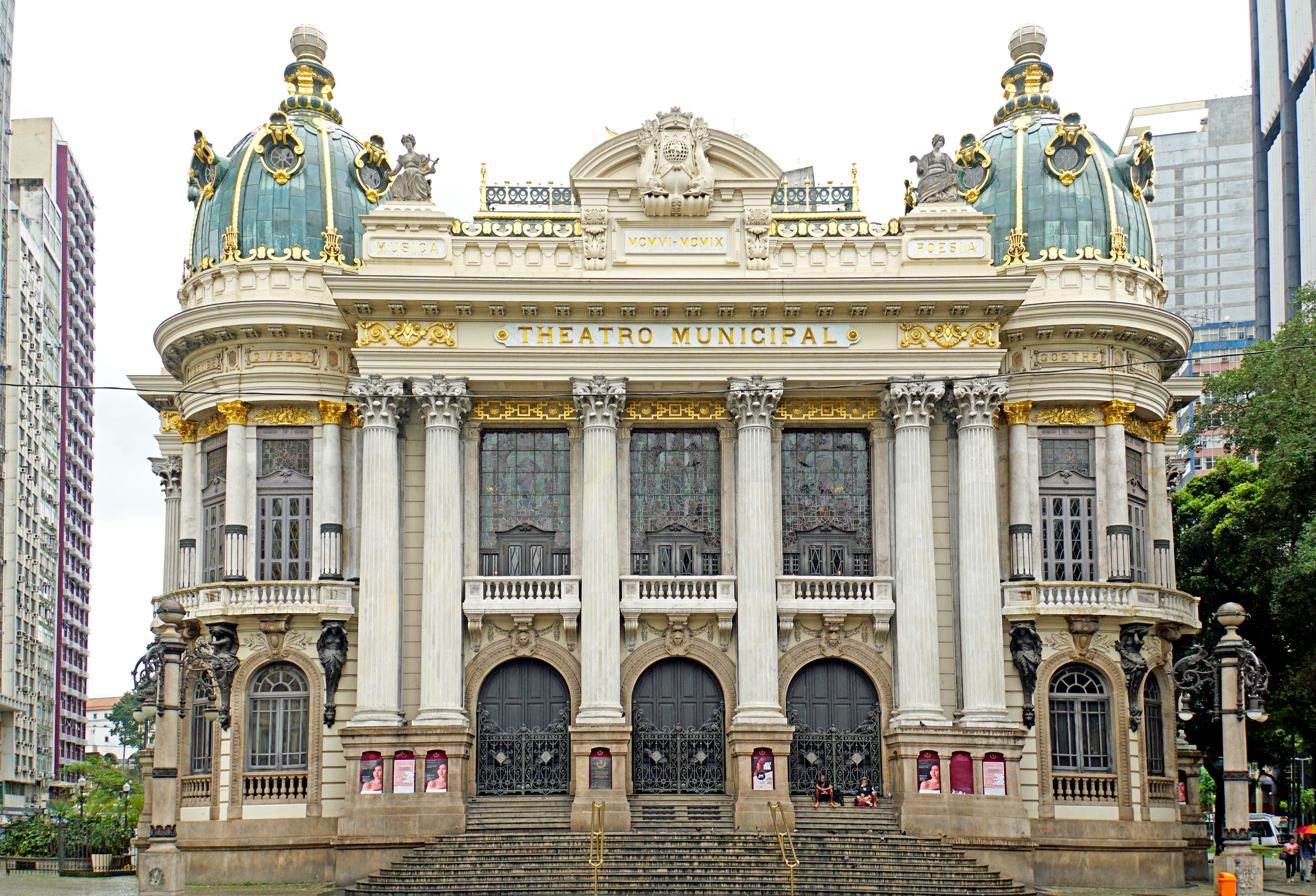
- Interactive map of the Theatro Municipal area

General information
- Type: Opera house
- Architectural style: Eclectic and Art Nouveau
- Location: Praça Floriano, S/N, Centro, Rio de Janeiro
- Construction started: 1905
- Completed: 1909
- Inaugurated: 14 July 1909

Design and construction
- Architect: Francisco de Oliveira Passos

Other information
- Seating capacity: 2,244

The Theatro Municipal ("Municipal Theater") is an opera house in the Centro district of Rio de Janeiro, Brazil. Built in the early twentieth century, it is considered to be one of the most beautiful and important theaters in the country.

The building is designed in an eclectic style, inspired by the Paris Opéra of Charles Garnier. The outside walls are inscribed with the names of classic European and Brazilian artists. It is located near the National Library and the National Fine Arts Museum, overlooking the spacious Cinelândia square.

== History ==
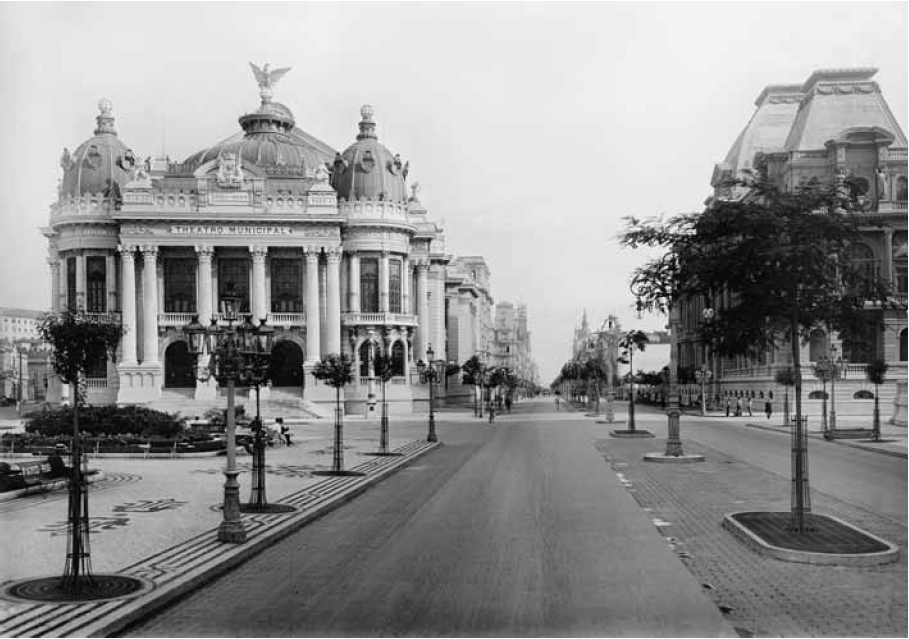
The Municipal Theater as seen from the Central Avenue (now Rio Branco Avenue), circa 1909.

In the second half of nineteenth century, theatrical activity was very intense in Rio de Janeiro, then capital of the country. Still, its two theaters, the Lyric and St. Peter, were criticized for their facilities, either by the public or by the companies that worked in them.

After the Proclamation of the Republic (1889), in 1894 playwright Artur Azevedo launched a campaign for the building of a new theater to host a local company, to be created along the lines of the Comédie Française. However, in those hectic days, the campaign resulted in only one Municipal Law, which ordered the construction of the Municipal Theater. This law was not enforced, despite the existence of a levy to finance the work. Thus, that the new tax revenue was never used for the construction of the theater.

It was not built until the beginning of the 20th century and it came to represent the new Republican regime and its associated new era to the elegant capital of Brazil. At the time, then-Mayor Francisco Pereira Passos launched a major upgrade of the city center by opening in 1903 the Central Avenue (Now Avenida Rio Branco), shaped after the boulevards of Paris and flanked by magnificent examples of eclectic architecture. Hence arose the opera venue, brainchild of Francisco de Oliveira Passos (Son of then mayor Francisco Pereira Passos) with the cooperation of Albert Guilbert and design inspired by the Paris Opera. Building began in 1905 on a foundation of 1,180 wood poles rooted in groundwater. To decorate the building, the most important Brazilian painters and sculptors of the time were summoned, such as Eliseu Visconti, Rodolfo Amoedo and the Bernardelli brothers, Henrique and Rodolfo. European artisans were also recruited to work on stained glasses and mosaic tiles.

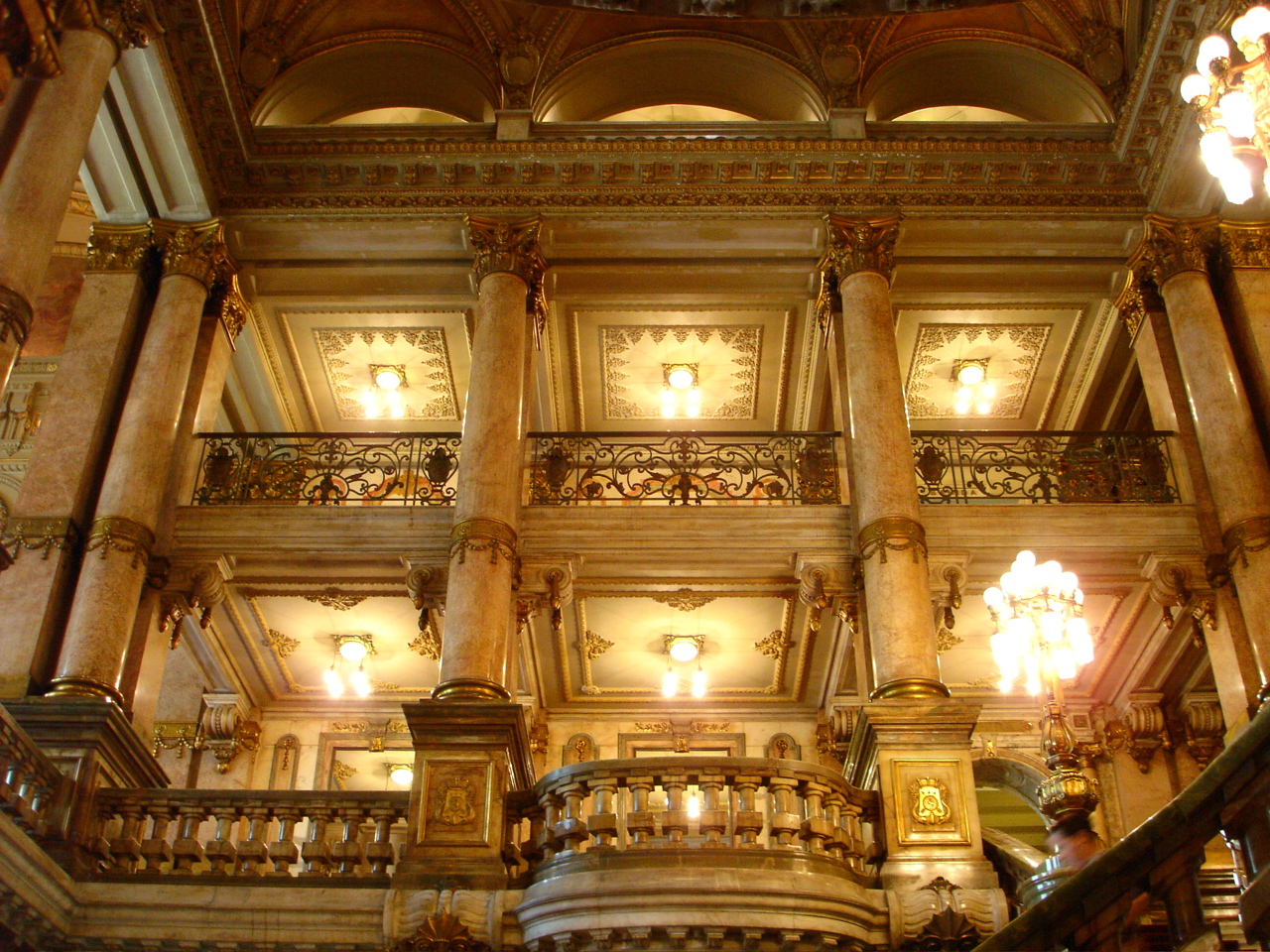
Inside the Theater: view from the staircase.

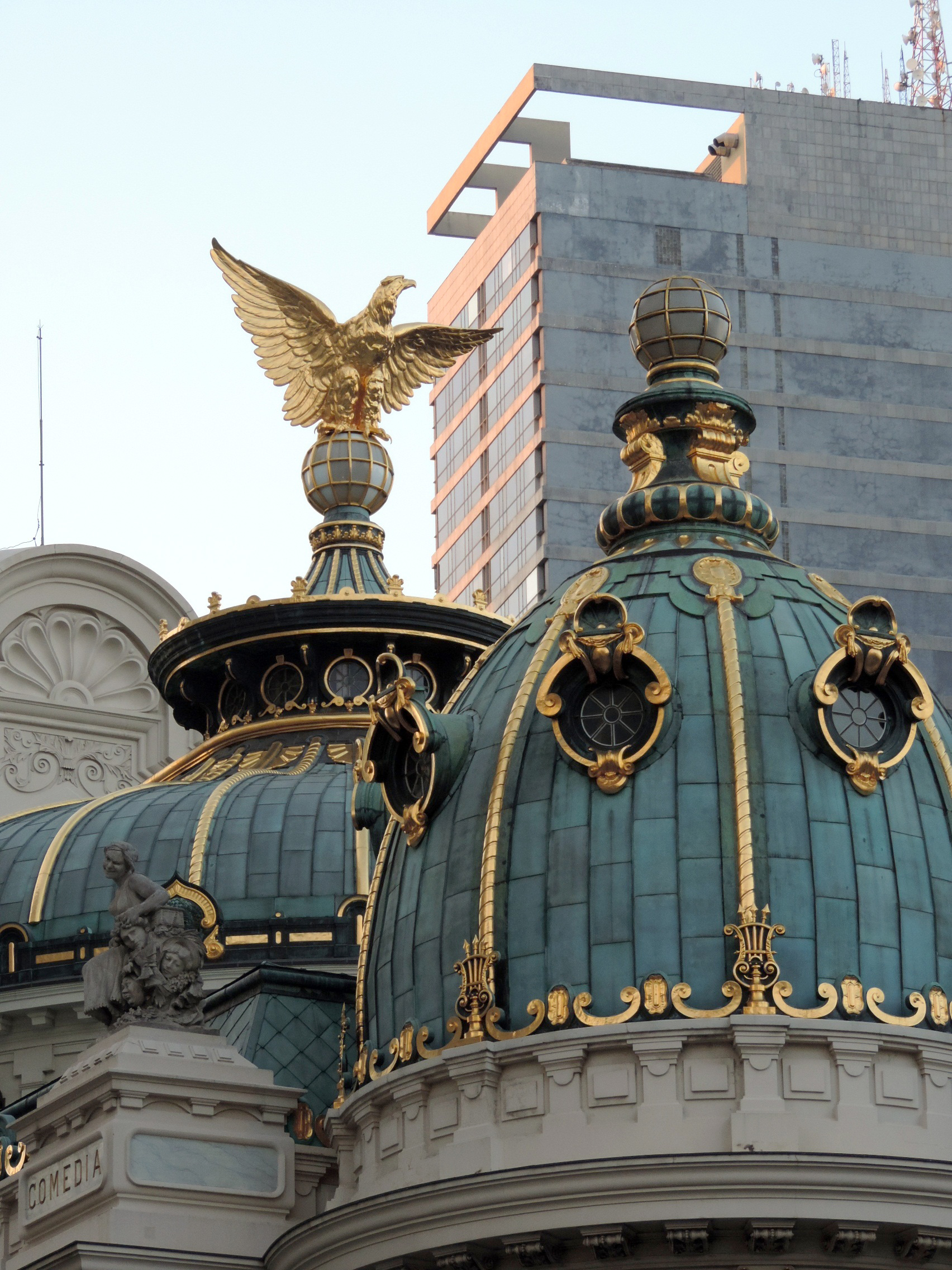
A gilded eagle sculpture atop the dome of the theater.

Finally, four and a half years later — a record time for the work that took the relay from 280 workers in two shifts — on July 14, 1909, President Nilo Peçanha inaugurated the Theatro Municipal do Rio de Janeiro, which had the capacity for 1,739 viewers. Serzedelo Correa was then the mayor of the city. In 1934, upon the observation that the theater was small for the new size of the population of the city, auditory capacity was increased to 2,205 seats. The work, despite its complexity, was held in three months, record time for the season. Later, with some modifications, it acquired the current number of 2,361 places.

The theater was closed on October 19, 1975, for restoration works and modernization of its facilities and reopened on March 15, 1978. That same year the Central Technical Production, responsible for all of the shows running in the house, was created. In 1996, the construction of an annex building began to relieve the building due to the intense practicing and other activities throughout the year. With the inauguration of the annex, choir, orchestra and ballet crews gained new rehearsal rooms and greater space for artistic practices and rehearsal.

Today, the Theatro Municipal mostly shows productions of ballet and classical music. In its early heyday, it featured only foreign opera and symphonic orchestra shows, especially from Italian and French companies. In 1931, the Municipal Symphonic Orchestra of Rio de Janeiro was created and celebrities such as Arturo Toscanini, Sarah Bernhardt, Bidu Sayão, Eliane Coelho, Heitor Villa-Lobos, Igor Stravinsky, Paul Hindemith and Alexander Brailowsky highlighted the programs of the Theatro. Today, it houses the Petrobras and the Brazilian Symphonic Orchestras.

== Features ==
The interior of the theater is as luxurious as the facade, with sculptures by Henrique Bernardelli and paintings by Rodolfo Amoedo and Eliseu Visconti, the latter responsible for the majestic drop curtain, the frieze on the proscenium, the nave ceiling and the decorations of the foyer ceiling. The restaurant Assírius in the basement is peculiar in its impressive Assyrian decor.
