= Elevado da Perimetral =

Elevated highway in Rio de Janeiro, Brazil (1960–2014)

The Elevado da Perimetral, also known as Via Elevada da Perimetral, was an elevated highway on the Avenida Rodrigues Alves, which connected the main road junctions of the city of Rio de Janeiro, in Brazil. It was developed in stages between 1950 and 1960. It was demolished in 2014 as part of the Porto Maravilha redevelopment of the Port of Rio de Janeiro.
