= Avenida Rio Branco =

Major road in Rio de Janeiro, Brazil

Rio Branco Avenue
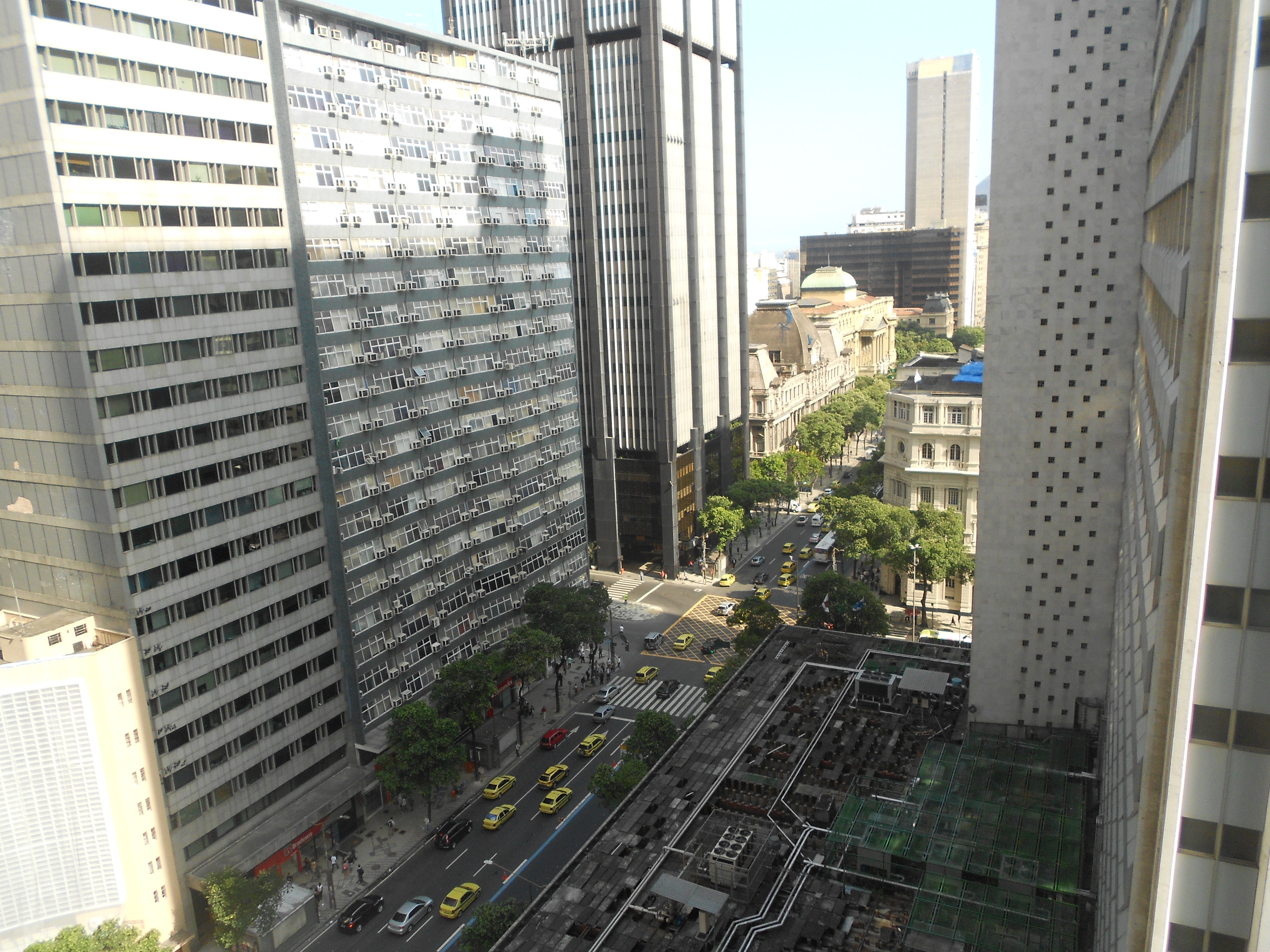
- Interactive map of Rio Branco Avenue
- Native name: Avenida Rio Branco (Portuguese)
- Former name: Avenida Central
- Length: 1,800 m (5,900 ft)
- Width: 33 metres (108 ft)
- Location: Rio de Janeiro, Brazil
- Coordinates: 22°54′17″S 43°10′39″W
- North: Praça Mauá
- East: Pres. Antonio Carlos Avenue
- South: Beira-Mar Avenue
- West: Republic of Paraguay Avenue

Construction
- Inauguration: September 7, 1904

Rio Branco Avenue (Portuguese: Avenida Rio Branco), formerly Avenida Central, is a major road in downtown Rio de Janeiro. It was built as the leading brand of the urban reform carried out by the mayor Pereira Passos in early 20th century.

It is one of the main thoroughfares of the city, being the scene of many important events.

In 2016, a 600-meter stretch of the avenue was permanently closed to vehicular traffic, and the Boulevard Luiz Severiano Ribeiro was built in its place. The promenade features 35 trees, 1,620 square meters of green spaces, bicycle racks, 70 benches, and renewed lighting.

== History ==
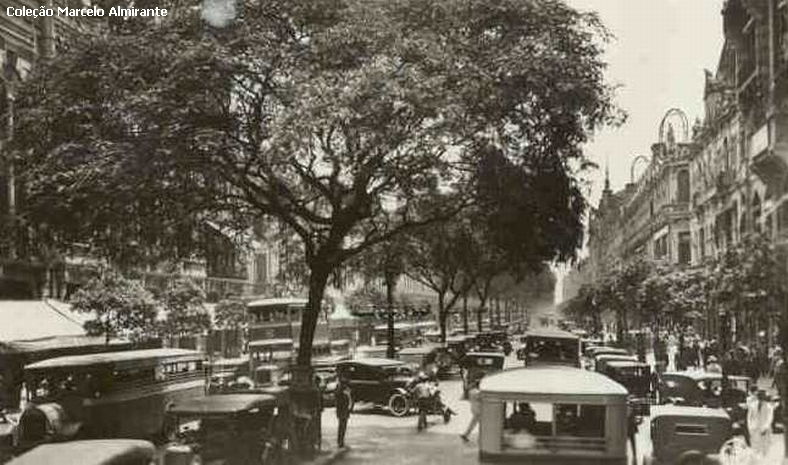
Rio Branco Avenue in the 1930s

The Rio de Janeiro of the early years of Republic still retained much of its colonial urban grid, which by now seemed outdated and anachronistic. Moreover, the old colonial center of town was overcrowded and prone to diseases such as yellow fever and smallpox. Out of this context came the opening of Central Avenue, part of a major modernization program in Rio de Janeiro following European urban planning and health policies.

The engineer Francisco Pereira Passos was responsible for the reforms, appointed mayor of Rio de Janeiro (Distrito Federal) by President Rodrigues Alves in 1902. The works commenced in March 1904 with the demolition of 641 homes, displacing nearly 3,900 people. The avenue was open after six months of work.

At the same time, Mangue Avenue was opened, Morro do Senado was torn down, the downtown's street were widened, parts of the Guanabara Bay's shore were developed and began the urbanization of Copacabana among other reforms. At the end of the government of Pereira Passos, in 1906, the city had a new look.

== Architecture and urban planning ==
The Central Avenue linking the new port city (where the current Praça Mauá) to the region glory, which at that time was expanding urbanism. The engineer Paulo de Frontin, head of the Construction Committee of Central Avenue, was responsible for the project. The new avenue was 1800 meters long and 33 meters wide and three hundred colonial houses were razed in the process to raise modern buildings. The facades of buildings for the Central Avenue were chosen in a contest, in which jurors were, among others, Mayor Pereira Passos, Paulo de Front in the Minister of Transportation and Public Works, Lauro Müller and the Director General of Public Health Oswaldo Cruz.

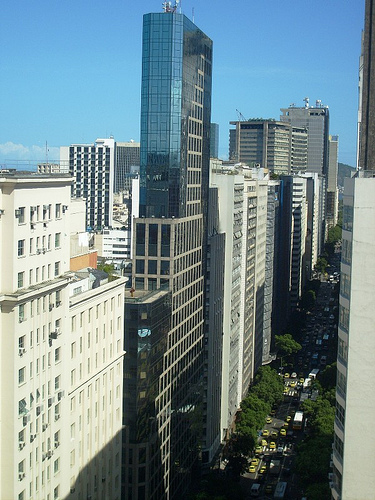
Rio Branco Avenue

The buildings are work of various architects, usually of European origin, with some Brazilians such as Heitor de Melo, Gabriel Junqueira, Francisco Monteiro de Azevedo Caminhoá and Ramos de Azevedo. The first to be erected, now demolished, was the Tobacconist London. In stylistic terms, Central Avenue is the hub of eclectic architecture in Rio outside government buildings. The predominant style was eclectic Frenchified, but several other models were followed, as the eclectic Italianate, neo-Gothic, neo-classical, among others. The avenue had a central garden plot and electric lighting. The sidewalks in Portuguese mosaic were made by craftsmen from Portugal.

The avenue ended at Central Praça Floriano Peixoto (Now known as Cinelândia), around which were erected several public buildings of great architectural value that still exist: the Theatre, the National School of Fine Arts (Now National Museum of Fine Arts) And the National Library. At the end of the avenue was constructed Monroe Palace, Senate seat, unfortunately destroyed in 1976.

The avenue was opened on September 7 of 1904 President of the Republic, Rodrigues Alves and delivered to traffic on November 15 of 1905. Received beautiful trees, which started on October 22, 1905, by planting the first tree pau-Brazil. When increased, but the trees were removed and the sidewalk that divided in half.

=== Changes and distortion ===
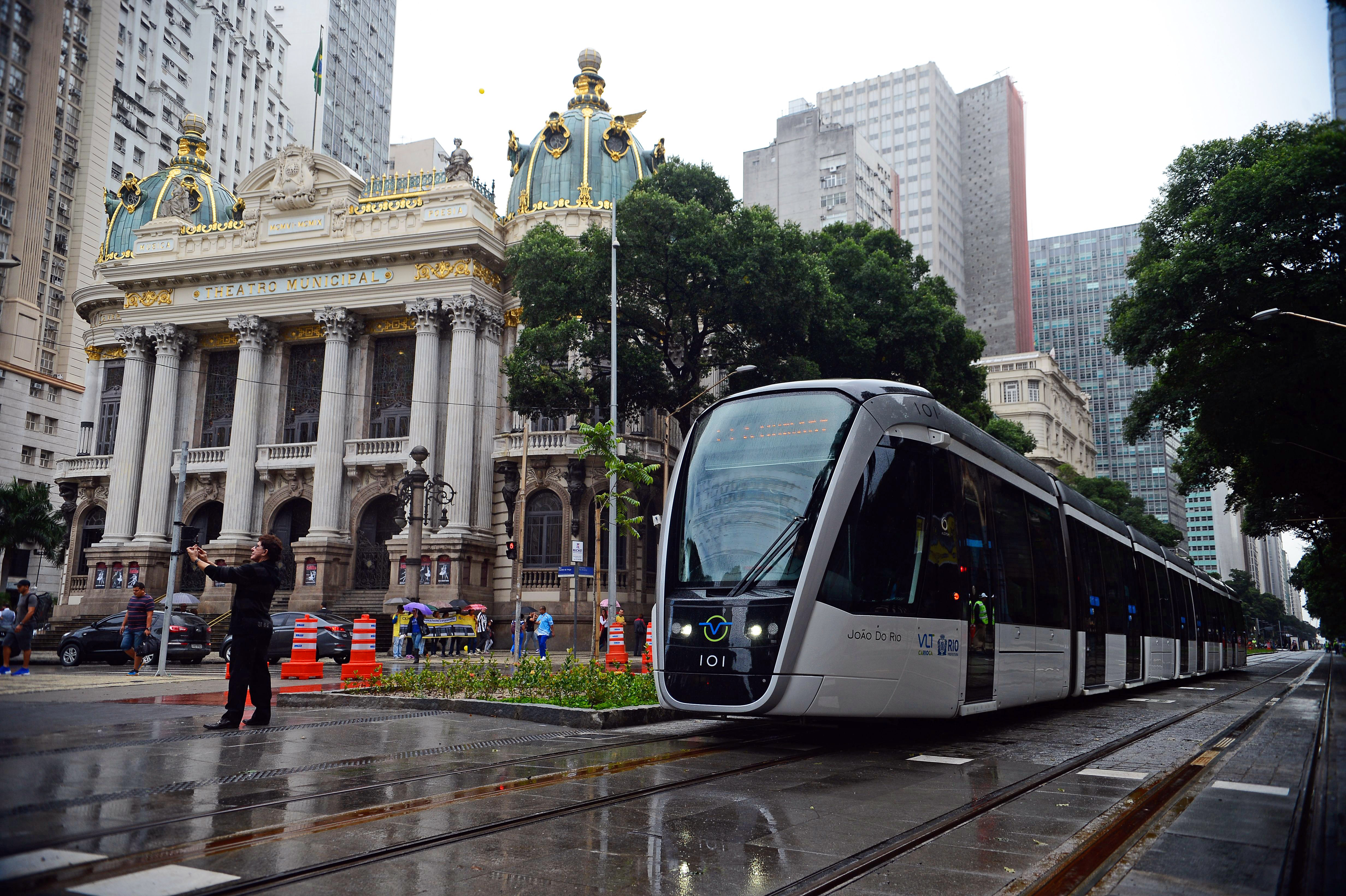
Tram passes along Rio Branco Avenue.

On February 21 of 1912, the name was changed to Avenue (Avenida) Rio Branco in honor of Rio Branco, Brazilian diplomat responsible for treaties which guaranteed the borders of Brazil who had died on February 10.

From the 1940s, with the advancement of architectural concrete, The avenue began to appear architecturally disfigured, to the point where, today, only a handful of original buildings are preserved. The much greater height of these newer buildings leaves little of the original scale remaining, and much of the street is constantly cast into shadow.

The Avenida Rio Branco is still one of the most important arteries of the city, in which are some of the major banks and offices in Rio de Janeiro.
