= Port of Rio de Janeiro =

Port in the city of Rio de Janeiro, Brazil

Porto do Rio de Janeiro
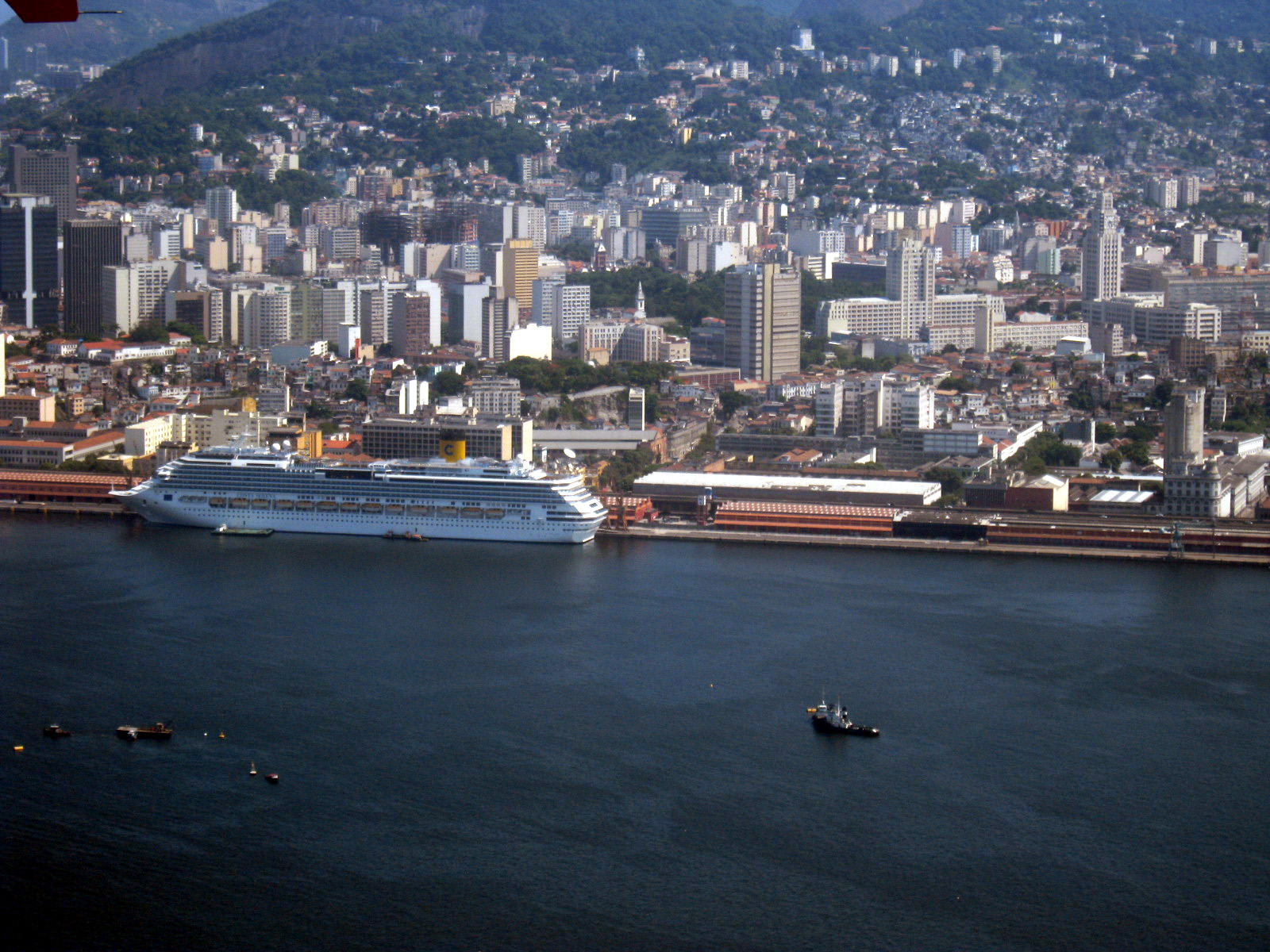
- Port of Rio de Janeiro in February 2011
- Interactive map of Porto do Rio de Janeiro

Location
- Country: Brazil
- Location: Rio de Janeiro, Rio de Janeiro
- Coordinates: 22°53′31″S 43°11′43″W

Details
- Opened: July 20, 1910
- Owned by: Companhia Docas do Rio de Janeiro
- Type of Harbor: Seaport
- Size: 1,000,000 m^{2}

Statistics
- Annual cargo tonnage: 6.1 million tonnes (2016)
- Website http://www.portosrio.gov.br

The Port of Rio de Janeiro (Portuguese: Porto do Rio de Janeiro) is a seaport in the city of Rio de Janeiro, Brazil located in a cove on the west shore of Guanabara Bay. It is the third-busiest port in Brazil, and it is managed by Companhia Docas do Rio de Janeiro.

== History ==
Share of the french Compagnie du Port de Rio de Janeiro S.A., issued 2 September 1912 - the operating company for the port of Rio de Janeiro, founded in 1910 with French capital

In the 1870s, with the construction of the Doca da Alfândega, the first projects for the development of the Port of Rio de Janeiro emerged. Decrees in 1890 authorized the companies Industrial de Melhoramentos do Brasil and The Rio de Janeiro Harbor and Docks to build a set of berths, warehouses and porches. The stretches were chosen between Ilha das Cobras and Arsenal de Marinha, and from Arsenal de Marinha to Ponta do Caju. In 1903, the Federal Government hired the firm C.H. Walker & Co. Ltd., to carry out construction works and improvements in the wharf areas. Subsequently, the Gamboa Wharf and seven warehouses were implemented. The official opening of the port took place on July 20, 1910.

In 2014 the elevated highway, Elevado da Perimetral, was destroyed as part of the Porto Maravilha redevelopment.

== Actuality ==
The port operates with loads such as: general containerized cargo, electronics, rubber, petrochemicals, vehicle parts, coffee, steel products, press paper rolls and solid bulk, such as wheat and pig iron.

== Access ==
The port has road access through BR-040, BR-101, BR-116, RJ-071 and RJ-083; rail access via Arará Terminal, operated by MRS Logística S / A, in wide gauge (1.60m), suitable for use also in the narrow gauge (1.00m), operated by FCA - Ferrovia Centro Atlântica. It connects the port to the Center-South region of Rio de Janeiro (Vale do Paraíba) and from there to the states of São Paulo and Minas Gerais. Maritime access through Guanabara Bay.

== Technical data ==
The port has a 6.7 km long pier with 31 berths. Draft between 10 and 15 meters. 15 open patios and 18 warehouses. In 2016, it handled 6,102,907 T in cargo and 299,833 TEU in containers. The main exports were pig iron, steel products and vehicles. The main imports were: wheat, steel products and zinc concentrate.
