= Centro, Rio de Janeiro =

Neighborhood in Rio de Janeiro, Brazil

Downtown Rio de Janeiro Centro
- Neighborhood
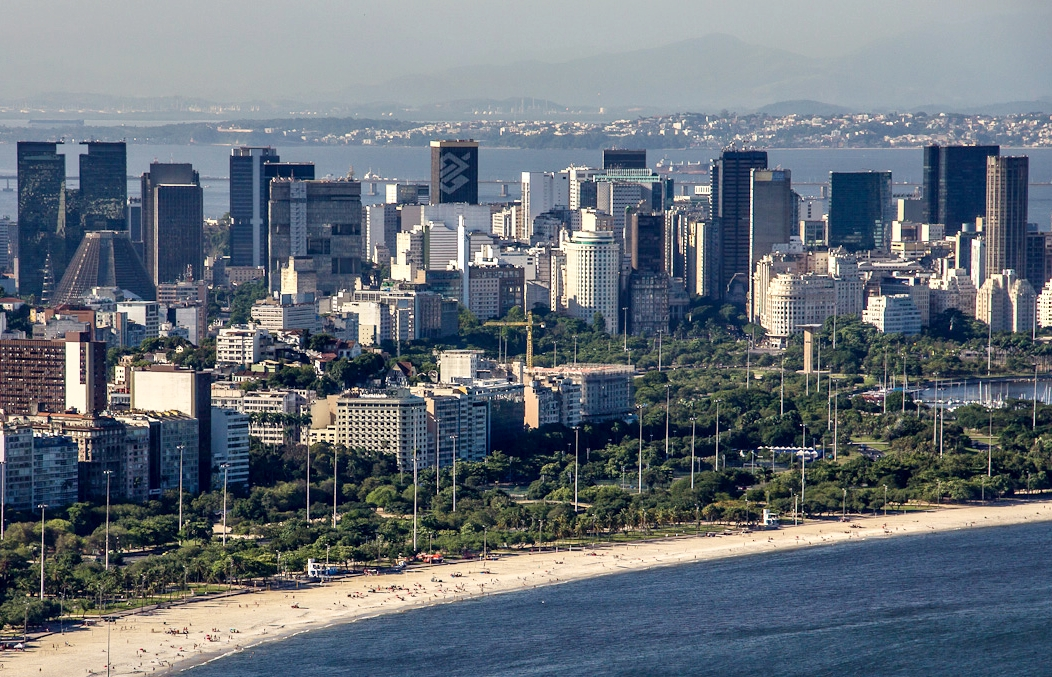
- Downtown Rio from Urca

- Location in Rio de Janeiro Downtown Rio de Janeiro (Brazil)
- Coordinates: 22°54′29″S 43°10′36″W
- Country: Brazil
- State: Rio de Janeiro (RJ)
- Municipality/City: Rio de Janeiro
- Zone: Centro

Area
  - Total: 5.72 km^{2} (2.21 sq mi)

Population (2010)
  - Total: 41,142
  - Density: 7,190/km^{2} (18,600/sq mi)

Centro (Downtown, lit. "Center") is a neighborhood in the Central Region of Rio de Janeiro, Brazil. It represents the financial heart of the city, and the crux of the Central Region.

== Characteristics ==
Despite still having a large number of residences, the neighborhood is predominantly commercial with a mixture of historical buildings as well as modern skyscrapers. Residential areas lie mainly along Rua do Riachuelo and Castelo. The historic and financial centre of the city, sites of interest include the Paço Imperial, Candelária Church, Igreja de Santa Rita de Cássia, the Old Cathedral of Rio de Janeiro, and the modern-style Saint Sebastian's Cathedral. Around Marechal Floriano Square, there are several landmarks from the Belle Époque such as the Municipal Theatre and the National Library building. The Centro area also has several museums such as the National Museum of Fine Arts and the National Historical Museum.

Other important historical attractions in downtown Rio include its Passeio Público, an 18th-century public garden, as well as the imposing arches of the Carioca Aqueduct and the Casa Cavé, the oldest confectionery in the city. A "bondinho" (tram) leaves from a station near Saint Sebastian's Cathedral, crosses the aqueduct (converted to a tram viaduct in 1896) and rambles through the hilly streets of the nearby Santa Tereza neighbourhood. Downtown remains the heart of the city's business community. Some of the largest companies in Brazil have their head offices here, including Petrobras, Eletrobras, BNDES and Vale. Most of Rio's skyscrapers, especially the tallest ones, are located in this neighbourhood. Crowded from Monday to Friday during regular work hours, it becomes empty during the evening and on Saturdays, Sundays, and holidays.
