= Bento Ribeiro, Rio de Janeiro =

Bento Ribeiro
- Neighborhood
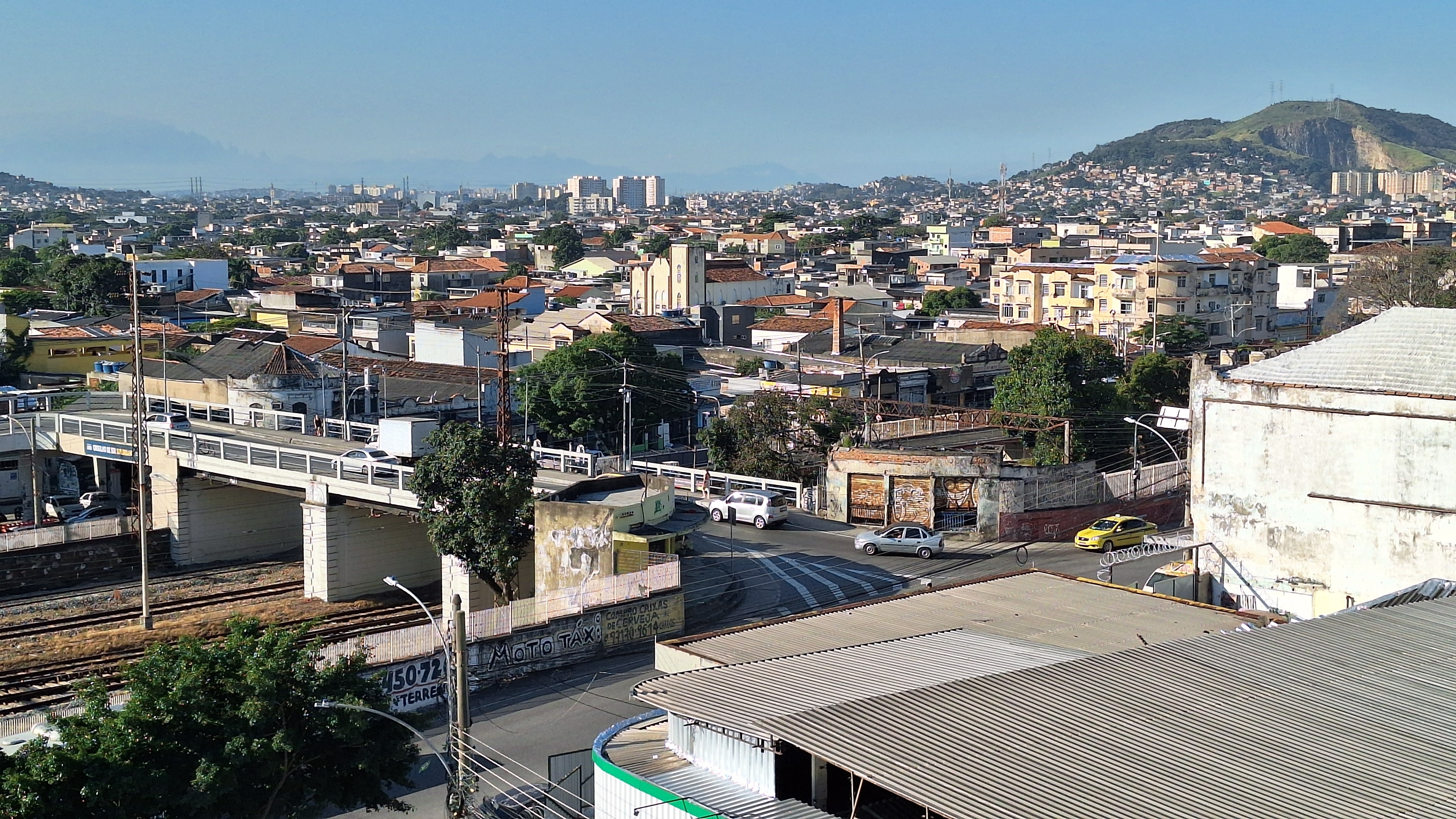
- Bento Ribeiro in 2026 as seen from Divisória Street, facing northeast
- Interactive map of Bento Ribeiro
- Coordinates: 22.867222°S 43.360833°W
- Country: Brazil
- State: Rio de Janeiro
- City: Rio de Janeiro
- Named for: Bento Ribeiro

Area
  - Total: 3.04 km^{2} (1.17 sq mi)

Population (2022)
  - Total: 37,306
  - Density: 12,280/km^{2} (31,800/sq mi)

Bento Ribeiro is a middle- and lower-middle-class neighborhood in the North Zone of Rio de Janeiro, Brazil. It is a suburban area in the vicinity of Honório Gurgel, Marechal Hermes, Oswaldo Cruz, Rocha Miranda, and Vila Valqueire. Bento Ribeiro owes its name to Bento Manuel Ribeiro Carneiro Monteiro, mayor of Rio de Janeiro between 1910 and 1914.

== History ==
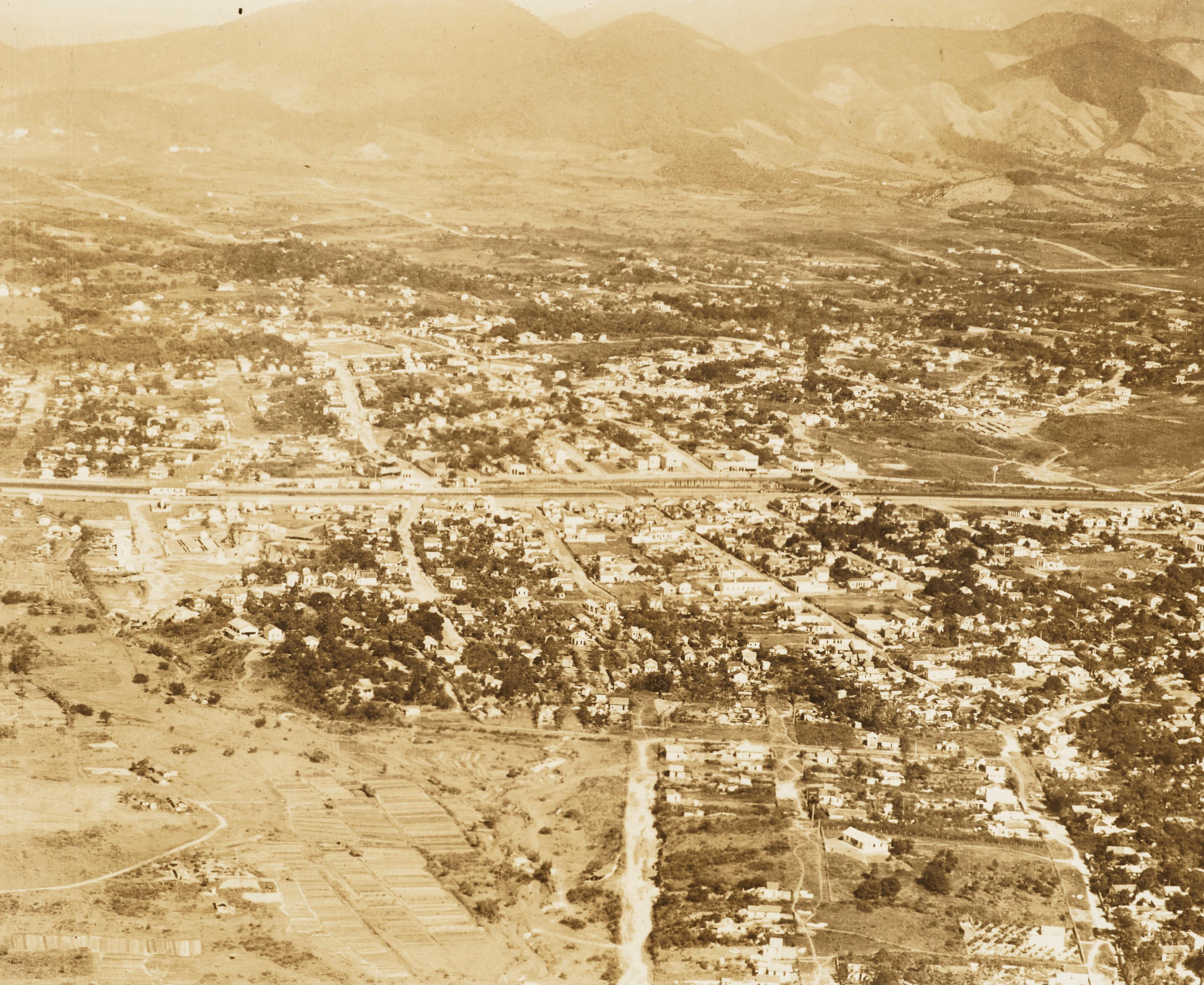
Aerial photograph of the neighborhood, taken circa 1929

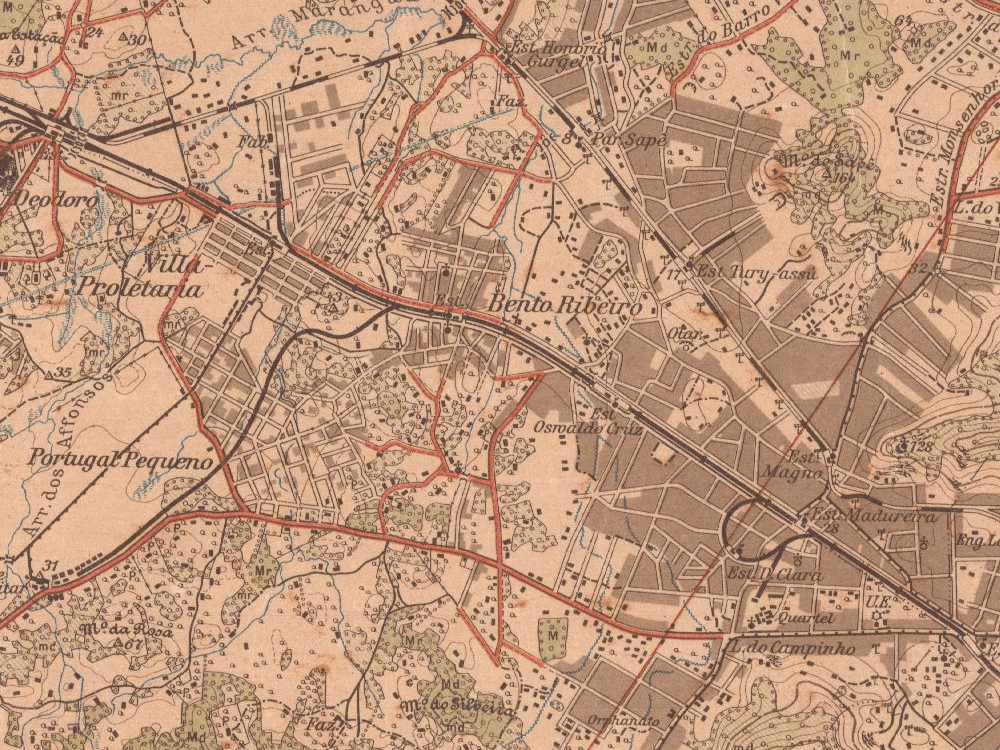
1922 map of the neighborhood

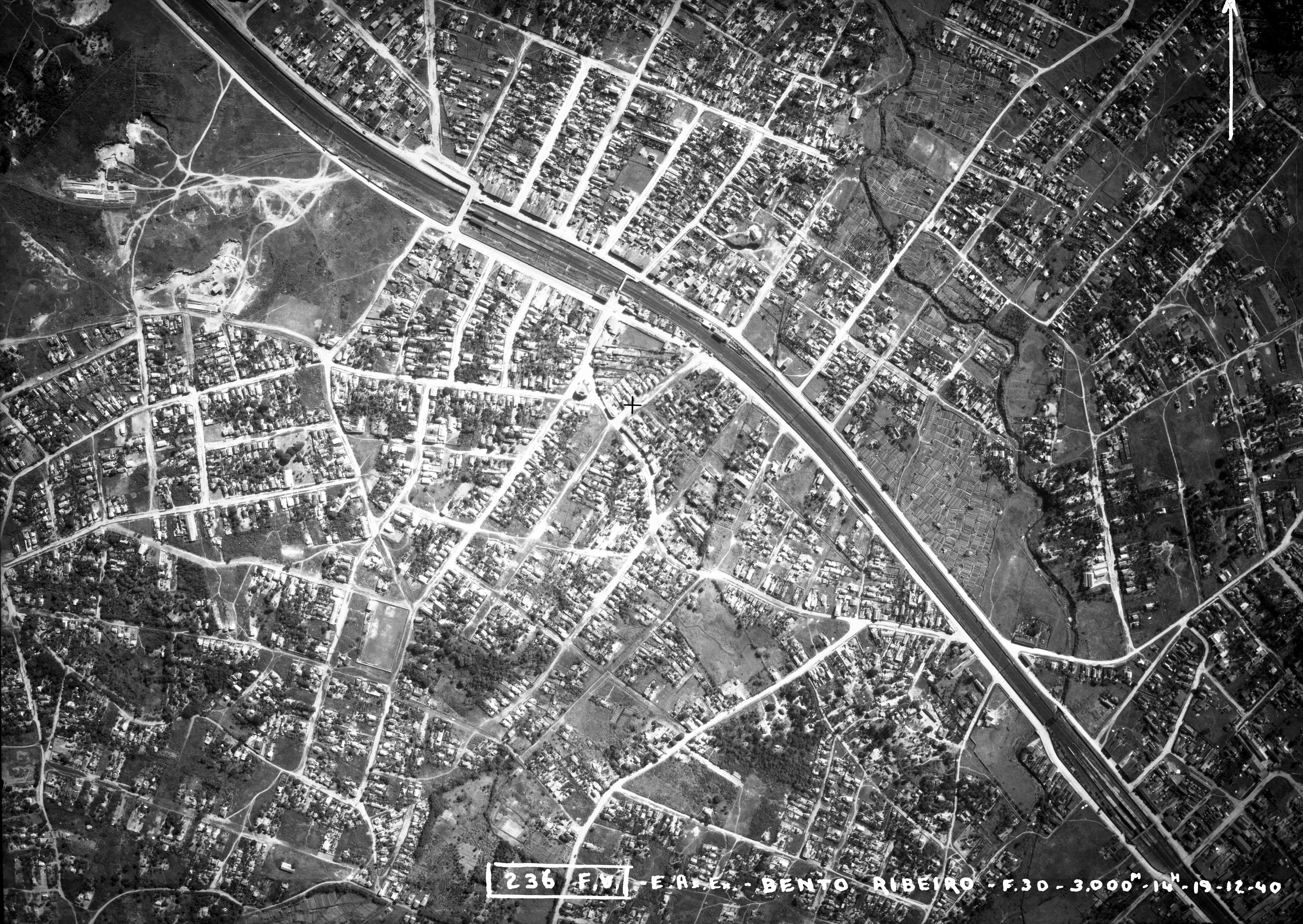
Bento Ribeiro on 19 December 1940

In the 16th century, the area that now includes the neighborhood of Bento Ribeiro was occupied by an Indigenous settlement known as Sapopema, (Note: "Sapopema" was the name given to large trees with massive, exposed buttress roots.) inhabited by the Tupinambá people. It was the largest village in what is now the North Zone of Rio de Janeiro. The village was mentioned in the work of Jean de Léry, who visited it personally in 1557, as well as in Portuguese land grant (sesmaria) records; in November 1567, Portuguese authorities issued a land grant to a man named Clemente Peres Ferreira, granting him the lands of Sapopema. By 1612, the Sapopemba sugar mill was already in existence. The name has survived as part of the area's cultural heritage, as Bento Ribeiro is home to a street named Sapopemba, one of its main streets.

The neighborhood developed along João Vicente and Carolina Machado streets. With the opening of Dom Pedro II Railway, Prefeito Bento Ribeiro Station was inaugurated in 1914, running through the area. It is named in honor of Bento Manuel Ribeiro Carneiro Monteiro, a general and mayor of Rio de Janeiro from 1910 to 1914 during the administration of Marshal Hermes da Fonseca. By that time, the region was already considerably populated; in addition to residents who had moved from downtown Rio following Pereira Passos's urban renewal reforms, Bento Ribeiro was also home to Portuguese and Italian immigrants, who purchased inexpensive plots of land from the former Sapopemba and Boa Esperança farms. Bento Ribeiro, like many other neighborhoods in Rio de Janeiro's North Zone, ultimately had its development boosted by the expansion of the city's railway network.

Public street lighting reached the neighborhood in 1927. In 1926, newspaper Correio da Manhã stated it was surprising that it had not yet reached Bento Ribeiro, arguing the distance from Oswaldo Cruz to the neighborhood was so short as to make the extension of the electric service entirely straightforward. The following year, public street lighting was finally inaugurated in Bento Ribeiro along a section of João Vicente Street, and it was reported that, in the following month, the same improvement would be extended to Carolina Machado Street, another section of João Vicente Street, and additional streets.

Bento Ribeiro is regarded as a place where Rio de Janeiro's traditional suburban culture has withstood the passage of time. Predominantly residential and characterized by a strong sense of community, its pace of life is generally quieter than that of many other parts of the city. Many families have lived in the area for decades, and the local businesses continue to play a role in strengthening community life.

=== Infrastructure ===
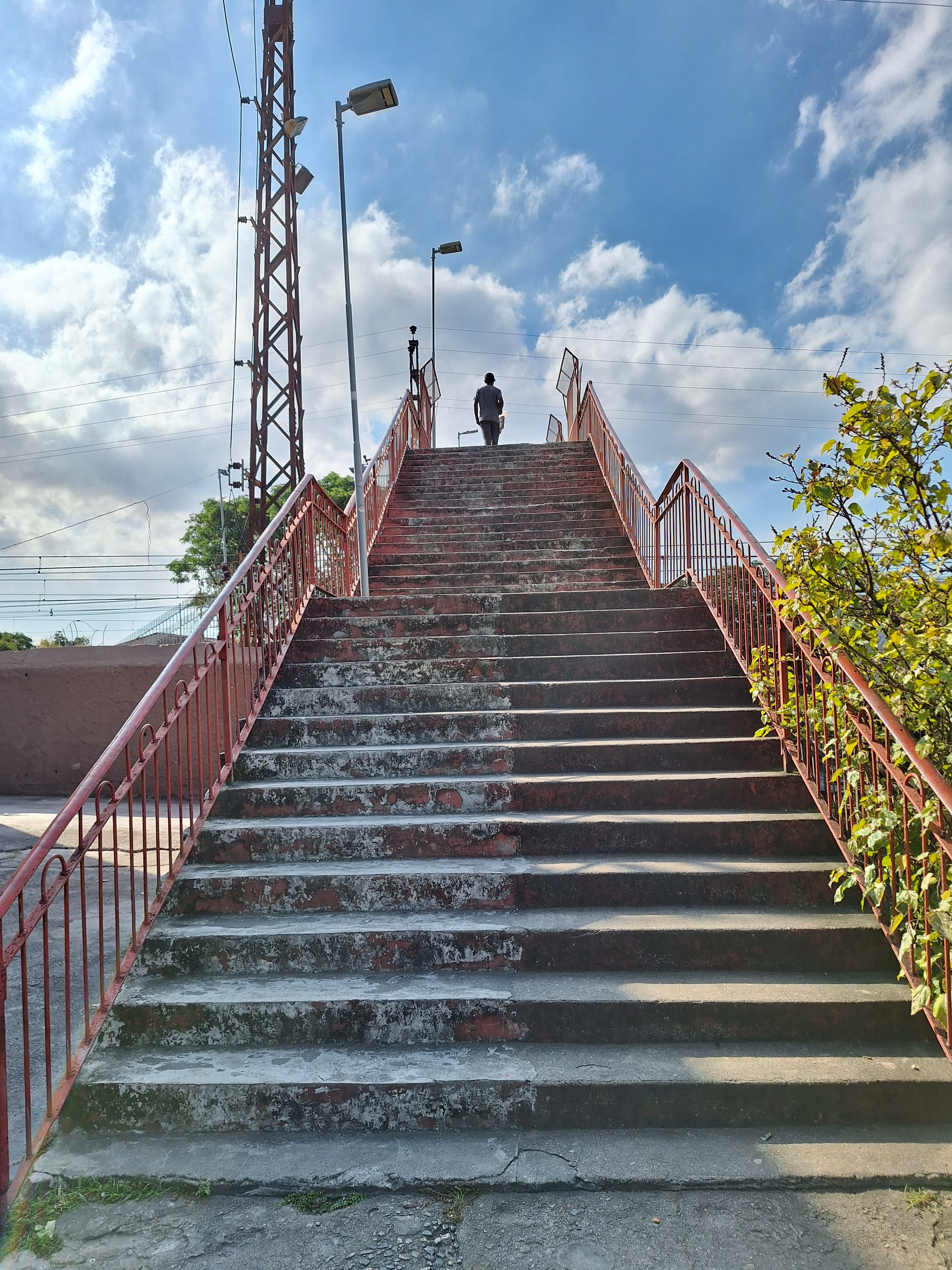
Ponte Vermelha (lit. 'red bridge')

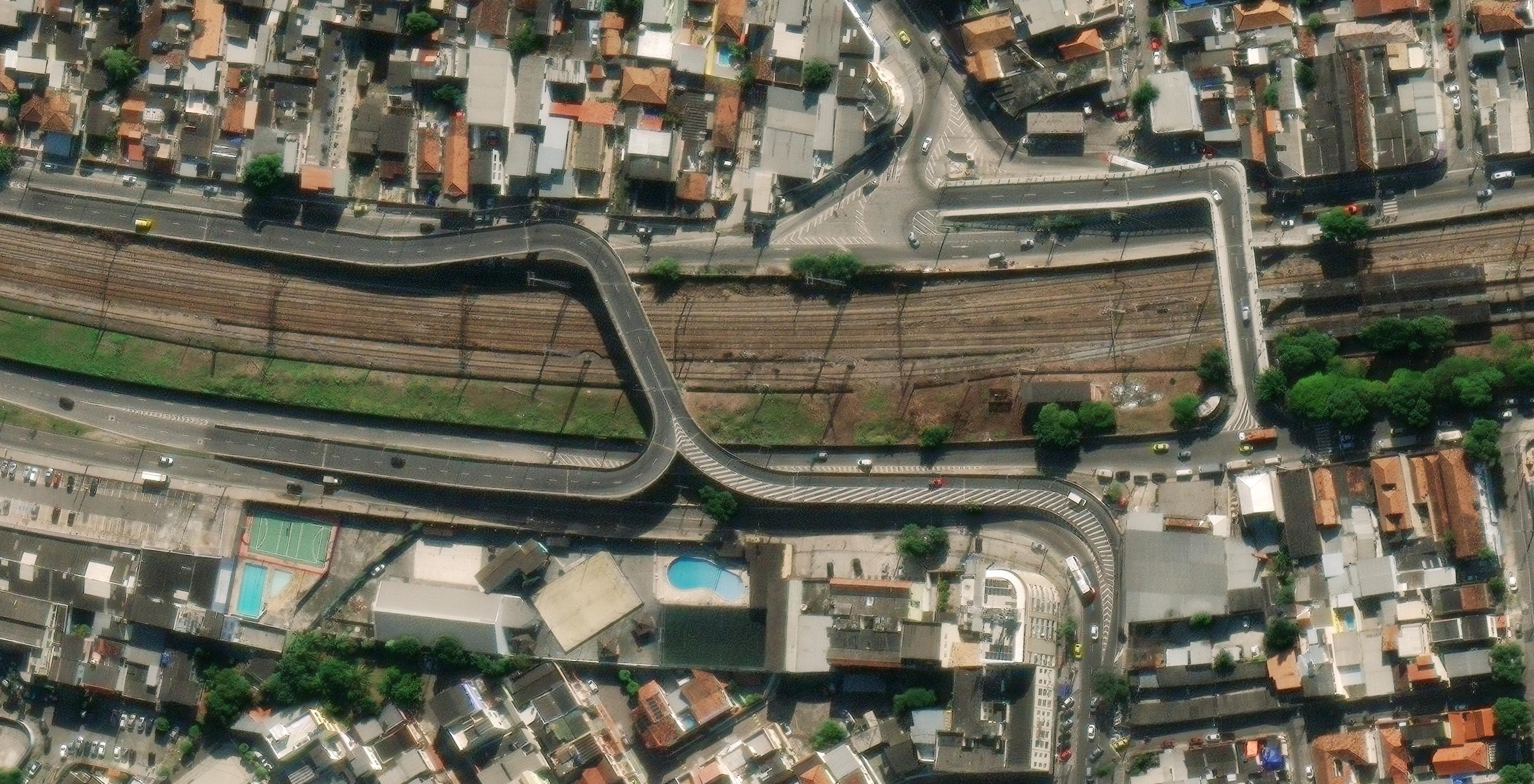
Altivo Carissimi Pamphiro (left) and Imo Monteiro dos Santos (right) overpasses in 2022

By the end of the 19th century, João Vicente and Carolina Machado streets were opened alongside the railway at the initiative of politician Luís Manuel Machado Júnior, who was influential in the parish of Irajá, to which the area then belonged. Machado Júnior was the son of a woman named Carolina Machado and honored his mother by naming a street after her; João Vicente Street was named in honor of Portuguese physician João Vicente Martins. Although the railway had existed since 1858, a wall dividing the neighborhood was not built until 1918. To allow passage between the two sides, there was an opening in the wall at the point where Queimado Road crossed it; in the mid-1920s, Ponte Vermelha (lit. 'red bridge') was finally built, so called in reference to its color.

In July 1930, an overpass for automobile traffic was inaugurated. In 2000, (Note: A contemporary report in Jornal do Brasil announced the inauguration was scheduled for 18 August 1998; by December 1998, O GLOBO was already referring to the overpass as having been inaugurated.) another overpass was opened because the old one could no longer accommodate two-way traffic; it became known as Viaduto Novo (lit. 'new overpass'). The overpass inaugurated in 1930, known as Viaduto Velho (lit. 'old overpass'), was finally named Imo Monteiro dos Santos in 2022 in honor of the founder of the neighborhood residents' association. A 2009 bill proposed giving the new overpass the name Altivo Carissimi Pamphiro; a 2024 legislative motion already referred to it by that name, which honors the founder of Léon Denis Spiritist Center. Imo Monteiro dos Santos Overpass, the Velho, carries traffic from João Vicente to Carolina Machado Street, while Altivo Carissimi Pamphiro Overpass, the Novo, carries traffic in the opposite direction.

== Culture ==
Throughout much of the 20th century, Bento Ribeiro had a cultural scene that included two movie theaters, a gafieira dance hall, two samba schools, and several bandstands.

The neighborhood's two movie theaters were both located on João Vicente Street, facing the train station. Cine Bento Ribeiro, inaugurated in 1925 with 392 seats, featured a pianist beside the screen to accompany silent films and also hosted live musical performances by artists such as mandolin player Luperce Miranda. It closed in 1967, and although the building remained abandoned as of 2023, it was listed as a protected heritage site by Instituto Estadual do Patrimônio Cultural as of 2025. Cine Caiçara opened in 1953 and operated until 1982. As of 2023, its former building housed an Assembleia de Deus church.

Another cultural venue was Clube Cedofeita, a gafieira dance hall inaugurated in 1930. It hosted performers such as Elizeth Cardoso and Pixinguinha and was frequented by leading samba figures, including Cartola and Zé Keti. Over time, the venue became associated with malandragem and attracted a predominantly Black, working-class clientele, leading part of the population to view it negatively. It remained in operation until the 1960s and, as of 2023, the building housed a sports gym located between do Queimado, Apodi, and Gita streets.

Bento Ribeiro was also home to two samba schools considered excellent, which competed alongside Rio de Janeiro's most traditional carnival associations. Lira do Amor, with its headquarters on Pacheco da Rocha Street, was led by Paulo da Portela. The other, Paz e Amor, counted Heitor dos Prazeres among its prominent members and had its headquarters on Tácito Esmeris Street.

In October 2012, a bronze bust in honor of Bento Ribeiro, the namesake of the neighborhood, was inaugurated in Manágua Square. The monument was part of an initiative to preserve memory and promote awareness of the history of different regions of Rio de Janeiro's North Zone. The idea arose from requests by residents and community leaders, and it was argued the installation would help preserve local identity. In 2016, the monument was vandalized: its concrete pedestal was spray-painted, and its identification plaque was removed.

=== Religion ===
Bento Ribeiro is home to two Catholic churches: Santa Isabel and São Sebastião parishes. Santa Isabel Parish traces its history back to 1917, when a plot of land was donated by Sebastião José Ribeiro at 1125 João Vicente Street, on the corner of Paracuru Street (then Santa Isabel Road), and a chapel was built that same year. In 1934, the chapel was elevated to parish church status and, in 1961, it was transferred to its current address on 17 Leopoldina Seabra Street, temporarily operating in a school theater. That August, Cardinal Jaime de Barros Câmara blessed the cornerstone of the new building; in 1964, Santa Isabel Parish was solemnly inaugurated. The church was administered by Augustinian priests from its foundation until 1942, when it was entrusted to the secular clergy; since 1949, it has been administered by Pallottine priests. São Sebastião Parish was established in 1931, initially as a small chapel on Pacheco da Rocha Street. In January 1982, the foundation stone of the new building was laid in Manágua Square. Its façade features a contemporary design, and its floor plan was inspired by the shape of a large boat. Pope Francis–appointed Bishop Célio da Silveira Calixto Filho served as parish priest there.

The neighborhood is also home to Léon Denis Spiritist Center at 137 Abílio dos Santos Street, founded before 1970 by Altivo Carissimi Pamphiro, as well as Evangelical churches occupying the spaces of closed businesses, a common phenomenon in Rio de Janeiro's suburbs.

== Economy ==
Most of Bento Ribeiro's commercial activity is concentrated along Divisória (lit. 'divisory') Street, which was so named because it historically marked the boundary between the neighborhood and Marechal Hermes. In July 2026, a Supermercados Unidos store opened on the street, creating 80 direct jobs and expecting to serve 2,600 customers per day. As of 2024, the neighborhood had three street markets: on Fridays on Teresa Santos Street, on Tuesdays on Óbidos Street, and on Wednesdays on Sapopemba Street; as of 2015, all operated from 7:00 a.m. to 2:30 p.m.

== Geography and demographics ==
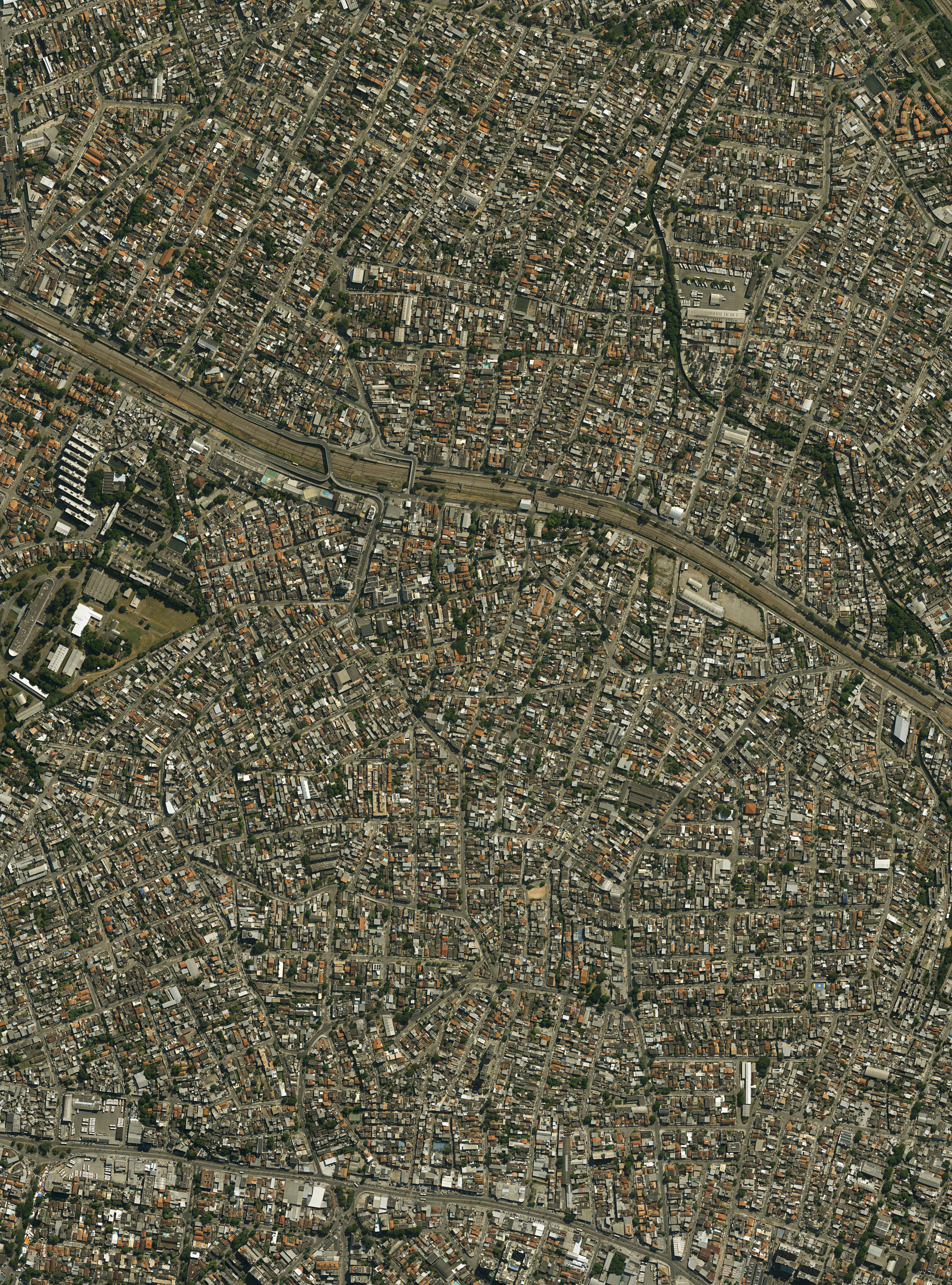
Satellite photograph of Bento Ribeiro on a Sunday (Note: A street market takes place on Jambeiro Avenue, in Vila Valqueire, every Sunday; it can be seen in the lower-left corner of the image.) in 2024 (Note: Also available for the following years: 1999, 2004, 2008, 2009, 2010, 2011, 2012, 2013, 2015, 2016, 2017, 2018, 2019, 2022, 2023, and 2025)

Historical population
Year	Pop.	±% p.a.
1991	47,586	—
2000	46,507	−0.25%
2010	43,707	−0.62%
2022	37,306	−1.31%

The designation, boundaries, and coding of Bento Ribeiro were established by Decree No. 3,158 of 23 July 1981, as amended by Decree No. 5,280 of 23 August 1985.

According to the Brazilian Institute of Geography and Statistics, the neighborhood has an area of 3.1377133 square kilometres (1.2114779 square miles). According to Prefeitura da Cidade do Rio de Janeiro, Bento Ribeiro has 303.78 hectares (3.0378 square kilometres, 1.1729 square miles); it also reported an area of 3037854.78567577 and a perimeter of 8506.04732439871 (without specifying the unit of measurement).

Bento Ribeiro is located in the North Zone of Rio de Janeiro and borders Honório Gurgel, Marechal Hermes, Oswaldo Cruz, Rocha Miranda, and Vila Valqueire. The code for the neighborhood is 89, and it belongs to Administrative Region XV, Madureira, and Planning Area 3.

1991 census

According to the 1991 census, the population of the neighborhood consisted of 22,258 men and 25,328 women, totaling 47,586 people and ranking 36th among 157 neighborhoods.

The Municipal Human Development Index was 0.789, ranking 61st among 126 neighborhoods or groups of neighborhoods. Life expectancy at birth was 69.60 years, and the adult literacy rate was 95.87%, with a gross school enrollment rate of 81.49%. People aged 25 or older had, on average, 7.42 years of schooling; the percentage with fewer than 8 years of schooling was 44.86%, while 10.52% had more than 11 years. Among people aged 25 or older, 1.75% were enrolled in higher education, and 3.38% were either enrolled in or had already completed it.

Per capita income, expressed in Brazilian reais as of 2000, was R$280.98 (equivalent to R$1,146 in 2020). The percentage derived from government transfers (Note: Retirement benefits, pensions, and official assistance programs) was 19.39%, while the percentage derived from labor income was 72.09%. The percentage of people whose income consisted of more than 50% government transfers was 15.71%. Of total neighborhood income, 4.14% accrued to the poorest 20% of the population; 13.28% to the poorest 40%; 27.58% to the poorest 60%; and 50.21% to the poorest 80%, leaving 49.79% to the richest 20%. The richest 10% accounted for 32.67% of total neighborhood income. The ratio between the average income of the richest 10% and that of the poorest 40% was 9.84, and the ratio between the average income of the richest 20% and that of the poorest 40% was 7.50, with a Gini coefficient of 0.45 and a Theil index of 0.37.

2000 census

Historical population by age group (Note: The 2000 and 2010 data include more specific age groups.)
Age	2000	2010	2022 (Note: Cross-tabulations by variables yield figures that are slightly lower than the official population as part of the data is adjusted using statistical imputation techniques.)
0–4	3,110	2,135	1,541
5–9	3,246	2,338	1,960
10–14	3,509	2,973	1,901
15–19	3,947	3,064	2,064
20–24	3,746	3,285	2,392
25–29	3,452	3,431	2,523
30–39	7,009	6,289	4,832
40–49	6,826	6,316	5,190
50–59	4,834	5,951	5,353
60–69	3,886	3,999	5,005
70+	2,942	3,926	4,528

According to the 2000 census, the population of the neighborhood consisted of 21,590 men and 24,917 women, totaling 46,507 people and ranking 39th among 158 neighborhoods.

The Municipal Human Development Index was 0.851, ranking 53rd among 126 neighborhoods or groups of neighborhoods. Life expectancy at birth was 75.05 years, and the adult literacy rate was 97.95%, with a gross school enrollment rate of 88.15%. People aged 25 or older had, on average, 8.52 years of schooling; the percentage with fewer than 8 years of schooling was 35.01%, while 14.59% had more than 11 years. Among people aged 25 or older, 2.23% were enrolled in higher education, and 4.33% were either enrolled in or had already completed it.

Per capita income, expressed in Brazilian reais as of 2000, was R$399.85 (equivalent to R$1,631 in 2020). The percentage derived from government transfers was 24.70%, while the percentage derived from labor income was 59.95%. The percentage of people whose income consisted of more than 50% government transfers was 23.60%. Of total neighborhood income, 3.85% accrued to the poorest 20% of the population; 12.98% to the poorest 40%; 27.77% to the poorest 60%; and 50.67% to the poorest 80%, leaving 49.33% to the richest 20%. The ratio between the average income of the richest 10% and that of the poorest 40% was 9.82, and the ratio between the average income of the richest 20% and that of the poorest 40% was 7.60, with a Gini coefficient of 0.45 and a Theil index of 0.35.

In that year, 9,118 of the household heads were men, and 4,903 were women.

2010 census

Races in Bento Ribeiro (2010)
1. White: 22,100 (50.6%)
2. Black: 5,418 (12.4%)
3. Asian: 182 (0.42%)
4. Pardo: 15,957 (36.5%)
5. Indigenous: 50 (0.11%)
Races in Bento Ribeiro (2022)
1. White: 16,366 (43.9%)
2. Black: 6,445 (17.3%)
3. Asian: 31 (0.08%)
4. Pardo: 14,417 (38.7%)
5. Indigenous: 5 (0.01%)

According to the 2010 census, the population of the neighborhood consisted of 19,999 men and 23,708 women, totaling 43,707 people and ranking 45th among 160 neighborhoods.

Of the total population, 22,100 people identified as White, 5,418 as Black, 182 as Asian, 15,957 as Pardo, and 50 as Indigenous.

The Social Development Index was 0.595, ranking 61st among 160 neighborhoods. The illiteracy rate among individuals aged 10 to 14 was 0.91%. The proportion of households with adequate water supply was 99.82%, with adequate sewage services 96.37%, and with garbage collection services 99.99%. The average income of household heads who had an income was 3.36 minimum wages in 2010 values; (Note: That is, R$1,713.60 in 2010 values (equivalent to R$3,573 in 2020)) 47.49% of them earned up to two minimum wages, while 3.80% earned ten or more minimum wages.

In that year, 7,949 of the household heads were men, and 6,942 were women.

2022 census

Population pyramid (2022)
%	Males	Age	Females	%
4.12		70+		8.02
5.58		60–69		7.86
6.29		50–59		8.09
6.38		40–49		7.56
6.08		30–39		6.90
3.31		25–29		3.44
3.19		20–24		3.23
2.79		15–19		2.73
2.53		10–14		2.54
2.59		5–9		2.66
2.04		0–4		2.08

According to the 2022 census, the population of the neighborhood consisted of 16,755 men and 20,551 women, totaling 37,306 people and ranking 49th among 166 neighborhoods.

Of the total population, 16,366 people identified as White, 6,445 as Black, 31 as Asian, 14,417 as Pardo, and 5 as Indigenous.

The Social Progress Index was 64.88—higher than the city's overall average of 64.34—ranking 80th among 158 neighborhoods. The score was 84.51 in the Basic Human Needs dimension and 52.48 in the Opportunity dimension, below the overall averages of 85.04 and 64.01 respectively; still, it scored 57.65 in the Foundations of Wellbeing dimension, above the overall average of 43.97.

In that year, 6,473 of the household heads were men, and 7,981 were women.

== Notable people ==
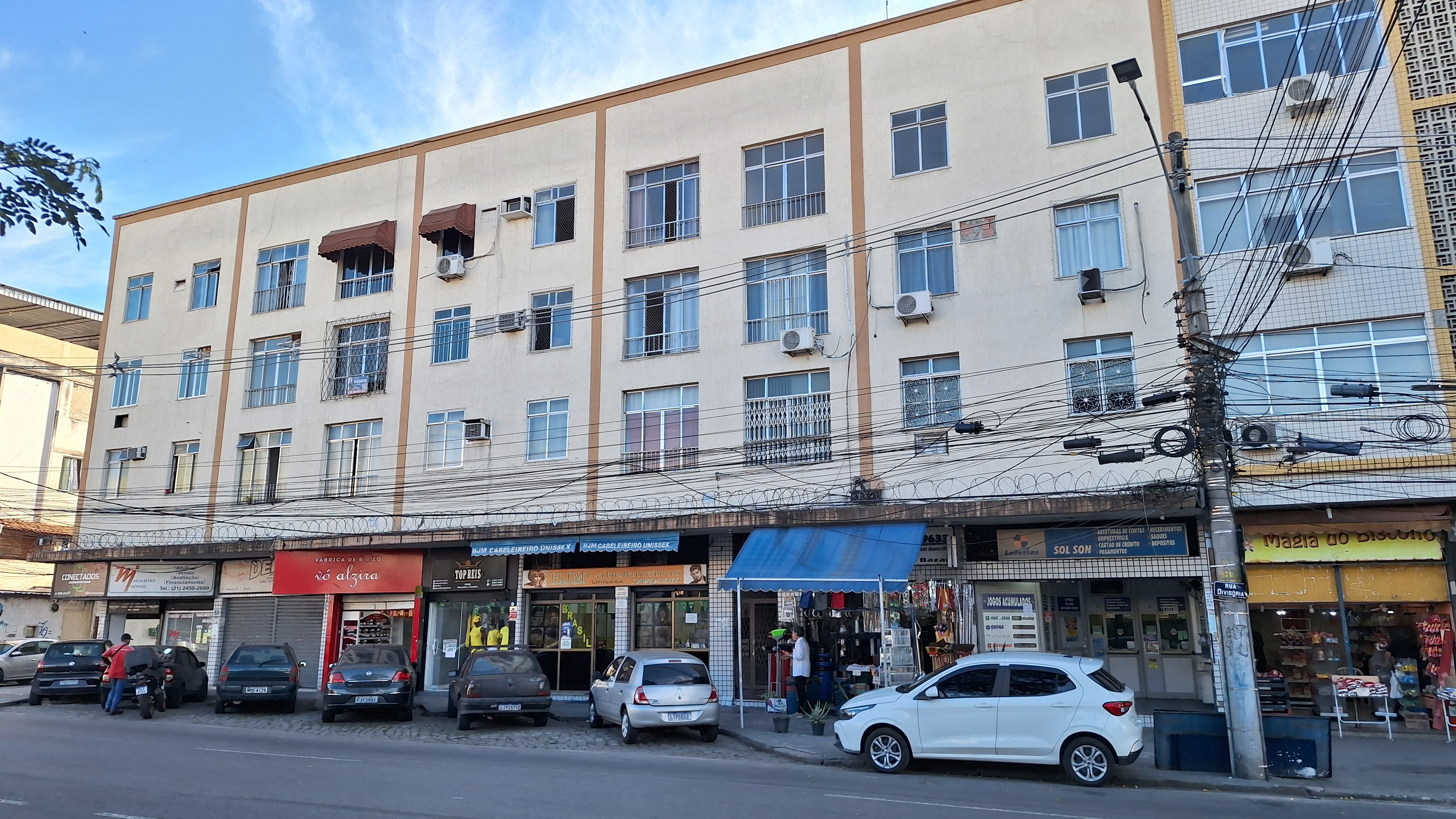
Apartment where Xuxa lived

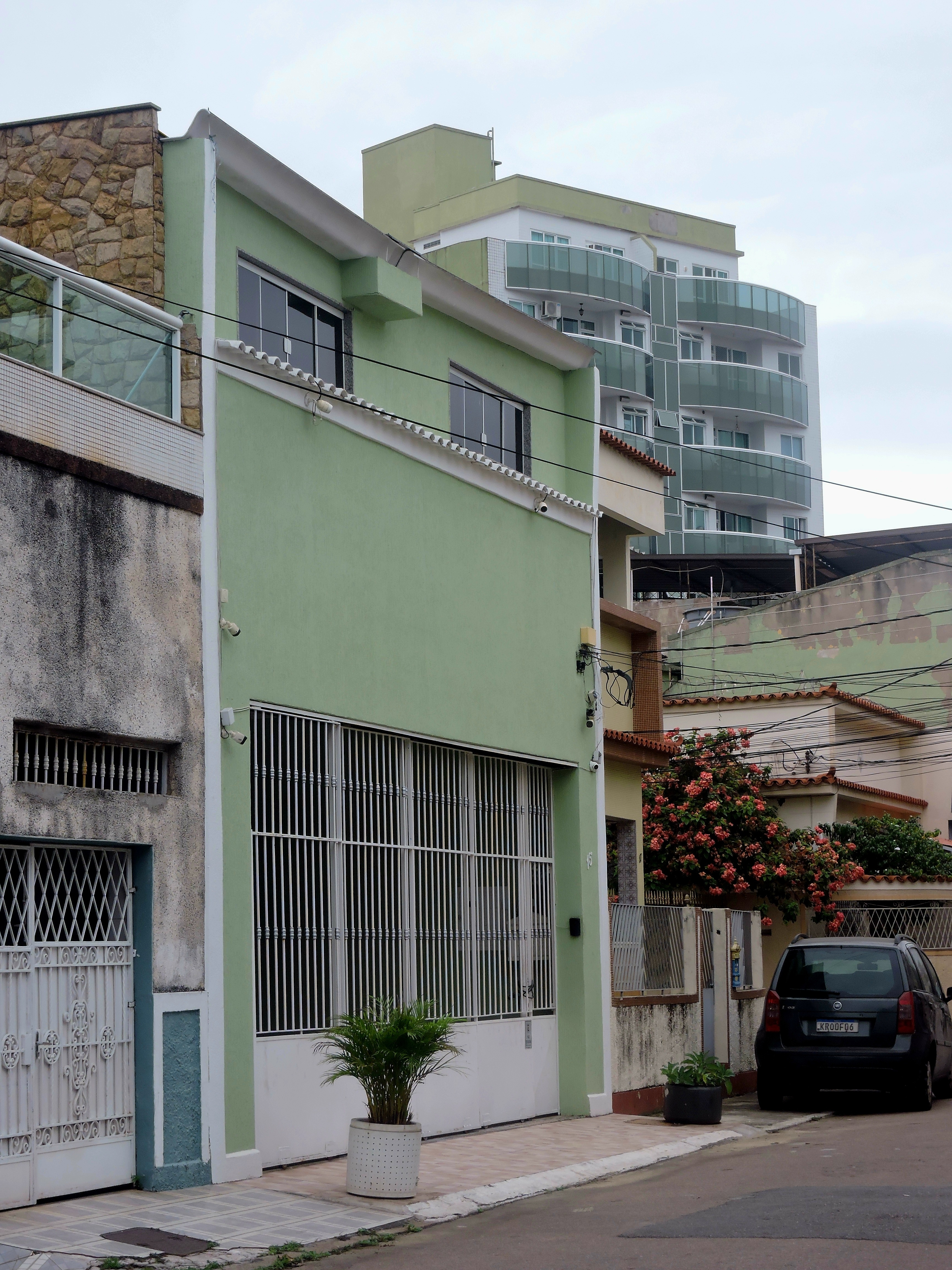
House where the Bolsonaros lived

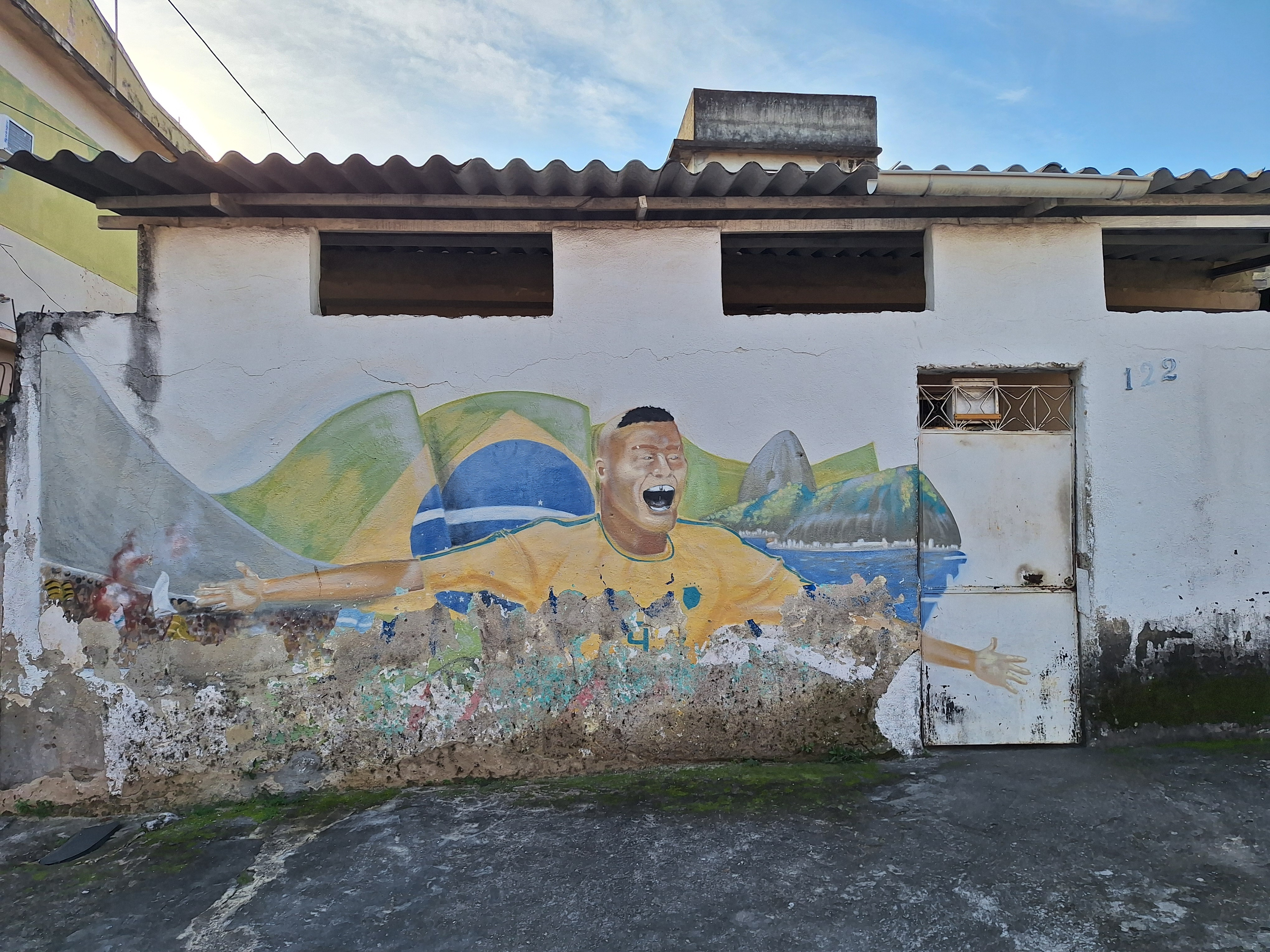
House next to the one where Ronaldo lived, featuring a mural honoring him

Bento Ribeiro has been home to several notable public figures, including former president Jair Bolsonaro, professional footballer Ronaldo, and television host Xuxa, all of whom lived in the neighborhood during formative periods of their lives.

Former president of Brazil Jair Bolsonaro lived in Bento Ribeiro after being elected as a city councilman in Rio de Janeiro. He acquired House 15 in the subdivision created from 30 Divisória Street, where he lived with his wife, Rogéria Nantes, and their three sons, Flávio, Carlos, and Eduardo, from the late 1980s until the mid-1990s, when the family moved to Tijuca. For decades, the property also served as an informal political office for the family's electoral activities and has been described as "the Bolsonaro clan's political headquarters". In 2023, the house was targeted in a stoning attack.

Professional footballer Ronaldo, a three-time FIFA World Player of the Year and two-time FIFA World Cup champion, grew up at 114 General César Obino Street in Bento Ribeiro. His maternal grandparents, originally from Bahia, settled in the area around the neighborhood in the 1940s. It was there that Ronaldo began playing football, training on fields near Divisória Street and representing three local clubs before joining Cruzeiro in 1993. The house where he lived remains in his family's possession and has reportedly become a tourist attraction because of his fame.

Television host Xuxa lived in Bento Ribeiro from the age of 7 until 17. Born in Santa Rosa, Rio Grande do Sul, she moved to Rio de Janeiro after her father, a military officer, was transferred to the city. Xuxa lived in Rio Grande Building, at 30 Divisória Street, and received her First Communion at Santa Isabel Parish. While living in the neighborhood, she was discovered at the age of 15 and invited to appear on a magazine cover and, at 17, met footballer Pelé, with whom she had a relationship for six years.

One of the greatest figures in Brazilian jiu-jitsu, Oswaldo Fadda was born, lived, and died in Bento Ribeiro. He began training with Mitsuyo Maeda–instructed Luiz França and, in 1950, founded his own academy at 1191 João Vicente Street in the neighborhood, the first in Rio de Janeiro's North Zone. As of 2020, the academy was still operating under the management of a nephew of Fadda and, as of 2023, a bill had been introduced to designate it as cultural heritage of Rio de Janeiro State. Fadda is said to have played a vital role in spreading jiu-jitsu beyond the wealthier areas of Rio de Janeiro, understanding his gym as a socially inclusive project that welcomed poor and disabled athletes.

Bento Ribeiro was also the birthplace of singers Marion Duarte and Miracy de Barros, and was home to Paraíba-born poet Raimundo Santa Helena, one of the founders of Feira de São Cristóvão, as well as to writer and Black activist Ironides Rodrigues.

== Crime ==
Crime data for Bento Ribeiro
Year	Pedestrians	Cellphone	Vehicle	On buses
2020	176	77	136	19
2021	152	84	88	34
2022	209	72	146	12
2023	177	103	125	31
2024	113	133	187	16
2025 (Note: Data for the first half of the year only; the figures for the same period in 2024 were 55 robberies of pedestrians, 53 cellphone robberies, 88 vehicle robberies, and 9 robberies on buses.)	81	87	76	38

Crime data for Bento Ribeiro were published by O GLOBO using previously undisclosed data obtained through Brazil's Access to Information Law; the statistics released by Instituto de Segurança Pública divide the state of Rio de Janeiro into areas that typically encompass multiple neighborhoods. The mapping provides information on four different categories of crime; comparing 2023 with 2024, Bento Ribeiro recorded increases in cellphone and vehicle robberies, but decreases in robberies targeting pedestrians and buses.

=== Notable cases ===
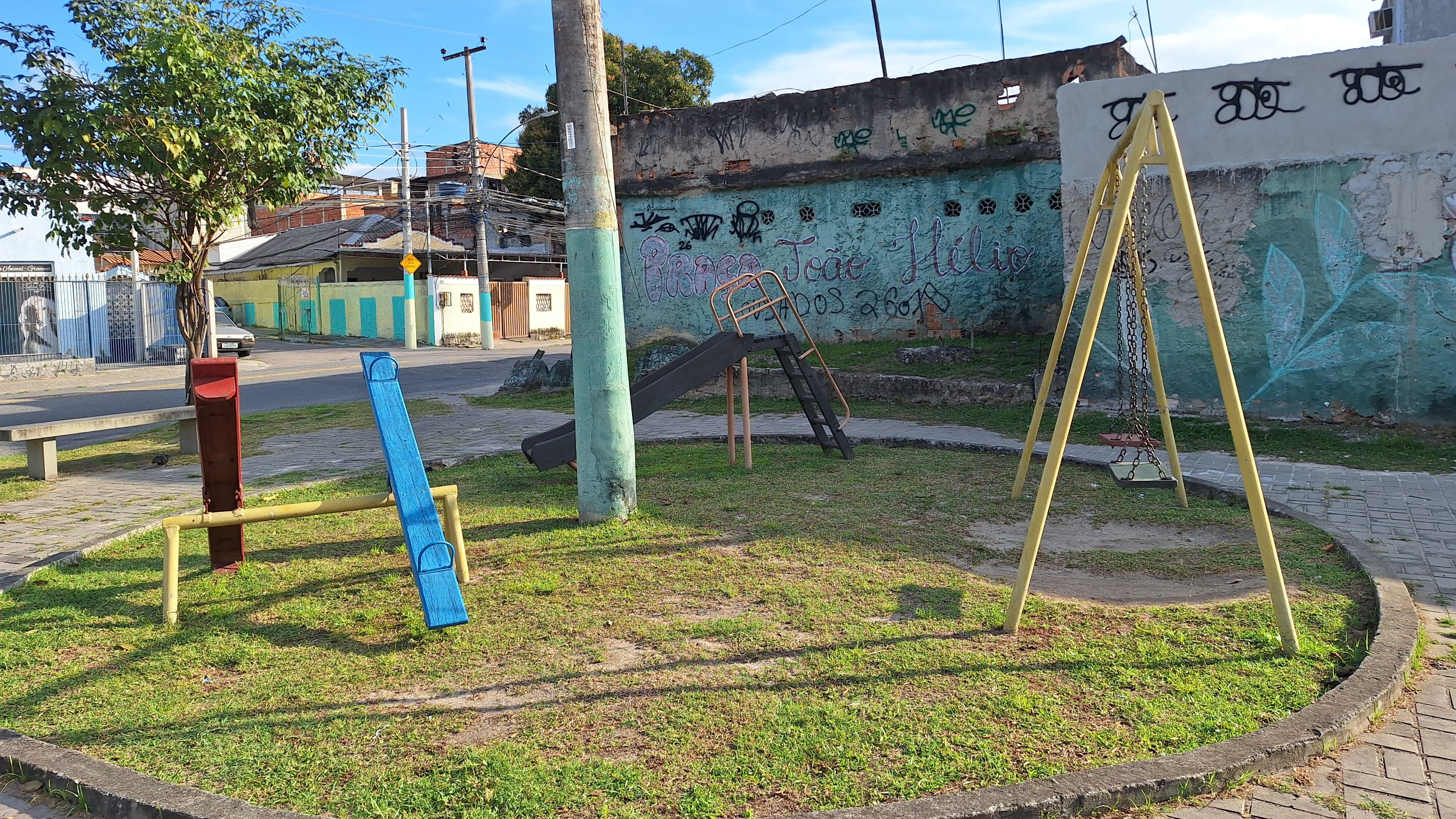
João Hélio Square in Bento Ribeiro, inaugurated in 2022

In 2007, the carjacking that led to the murder of João Hélio began in Bento Ribeiro. After the family of the boy left Léon Denis Spiritist Center at around 9:00 p.m. and headed home, the car driven by his mother was approached by two armed men at a traffic light. João Hélio did not have time to unbuckle his seat belt and ended up being dragged for more than 7 kilometers (4.3 miles) through the suburbs of Rio de Janeiro. The case generated public outrage due to its potential for media coverage. Following the crime, the location where the family's car had been approached came under constant police surveillance; however, a few days later, a police vehicle stationed there was riddled with assault rifle fire, and the two officers on duty were killed.

In 2009, Ronnie Lessa, who would later become known as the confessed assassin of city councilwoman Marielle Franco, survived a grenade attack on Mirinduba Street in Bento Ribeiro, near the Rocha Miranda military police battalion where he was assigned. After leaving a bar, the device exploded while Lessa was inside his armored Toyota Hilux, injuring at least one of his legs with shrapnel. He attempted to exit the vehicle but became entangled in the seatbelt, causing the pickup truck to continue for about 150 meters (490 feet) before crashing into a utility pole. The attack ultimately resulted in the amputation of one of his legs.

== Bibliography ==
- Avellar, Aline Pereira de; Bedendo, Ricardo (2007). "A Revista Veja e o Caso João Hélio: uma análise crítica do discurso da mídia sobre a segurança pública". XII Congresso da Comunicação na Região Sudeste (in Portuguese). Archived from the original on 16 June 2025.
- Drysdale, Robert (2023). The Rise and Evolution of Brazilian Jiu-Jitsu: From Vale-Tudo, to Carlson Gracie to its Democratization. ISBN 9798358633087.
- Ferreira, Douglas (2016). As culturas do jiu-jitsu e a produção de corpos e de masculinidades "cascas-grossas" (in Portuguese). Canoas: Universidade Luterana do Brasil. Archived from the original on 10 February 2026.
- Marchiori, Gustavo Silva (2020). Aspectos da inclusão da pessoa com deficiência e o Jiu-Jitsu Brasileiro: uma proposta de formação continuada (in Portuguese). Rio de Janeiro: Universidade Federal do Rio de Janeiro. Archived from the original on 21 July 2026.
- Polycarpo, Clara (2026). "Governando pelo fracasso: militarização e policialização no Rio de Janeiro". Cadernos Metrópole (in Portuguese). 28 (65). doi:10.1590/2236-9996.2026-6564742-pt. Archived from the original on 8 January 2026.
- Schapira, Raphael (2019). "(Im)mobilites of Brazilian Jiu-Jitsu Coaches from Rio de Janeiro's Periphery". Tsantsa (24): 115–120. Archived from the original on 15 May 2026.
- Schapira, Raphael (2025). "Embodying Virtuous Subjectivity: Brazilian Jiu-Jitsu between Individual Empowerment and the Moralization of Inequality at the Margins of Rio de Janeiro". In Kopper, Moisés; Richmond, Matthew A. (eds.). Subjectivity at Latin America's Urban Margins. Urban Anthropology Unbound. Vol. 2. New York: Berghahn Books. pp. 192–209. doi:10.3167/9781805396956. ISBN 978-1-80539-695-6. LCCN 2024020829.
- Silva, Cristina da Conceição (2013). "O que contam os sambistas de Madureira e Oswaldo Cruz sobre as rodas de samba nos quintais da periferia suburbana". Periferia (in Portuguese). 5 (1): 35–55. doi:10.12957/periferia.2013.15322. Archived from the original on 15 July 2026.
- Silva, Rafael Freitas da (2020). O Rio antes do Rio (in Portuguese) (4th ed.). Belo Horizonte: Relicário. ISBN 978-65-5090-003-8.
