= Murder of João Hélio =

2007 murder of a child in Rio de Janeiro

Murder of João Hélio Fernandes Vieites
- Location: Oswaldo Cruz, Rio de Janeiro, Brazil
- Date: February 7, 2007
- Attack type: Carjacking resulting in murder
- Weapons: Guns, vehicle
- Deaths: 1
- Perpetrators: Carlos Eduardo Toledo de Lima; Ezequiel Toledo de Lima; Diego Nascimento da Silva; Carlos Roberto da Silva; Tiago de Abreu Matos
- No. of participants: 5

João Hélio Fernandes Vieites (March 18, 2000 – February 7, 2007) was a six-year-old Brazilian boy who was murdered on February 7, 2007 by being dragged from a car for 7 km (4.3 miles) after an armed carjacking by a group of young males in Oswaldo Cruz, Rio de Janeiro. The callous and brutal manner in which João Hélio was murdered shocked the Brazilian public and received substantial coverage in Rio's media and throughout Brazil. The murder sparked a number of public protests demanding concrete solutions to the extreme violence plaguing the city, amendments to the constitution and penal code to increase the punishment for brutal crimes, and greater accountability placed upon adolescents who commit murder.

== Carjacking ==
Six-year-old João Hélio was the only son of Élson Lopes Vieites, and his wife Rosa Cristina Fernandes. They were a middle-class Carioca family living in the Zona Norte of Rio de Janeiro.

On the evening of February 7, 2007, João Hélio was riding in the back seat of his mother's car, a silver Opel Corsa B sedan, as they drove home from a religious center located in the neighborhood of Bento Ribeiro. Also in the car was a family friend and João Hélio's older sister, 13-year-old Aline.

Rosa stopped the car at a traffic light at the corner of João Vicente and Henrique de Melo streets in the Oswaldo Cruz neighborhood shortly after nine o'clock at night. There were already two cars stopped ahead of them. One of these was a taxi out of which three young men suddenly emerged, with two of them pointing handguns. They tapped the guns on the car windows to show that they were real metal guns and not fake, surrounded the car, and forced everyone to get out. João Hélio's mother, Rosa, who had been a victim of a street assault before, knew not to resist. She rushed to the backseat to help João Hélio unbuckle his seatbelt, but was pushed aside by one of the assailants. The car door slammed onto the seatbelt holding the child, leaving João Hélio's body hanging outside of the car. The assailants then accelerated away. Rosa and Aline chased the car screaming, but the car did not stop.

== Murder ==
The assailants drove a circuitous route through several neighborhoods, dragging João Hélio for a total of 7 km (4.3 miles) before abandoning the car with the child's body still attached to it. The assailants traveled in a mostly southeastern direction, traversing four different neighborhoods: Oswaldo Cruz, Madureira, Campinho, and Cascadura.

At the time of the incident, Police Chief Hercules Pires do Nascimento stated that the assailants were well aware that they were dragging a child, and drove in a zig-zag fashion in an attempt to eject his body from the car. He added that their demeanor was cold and indifferent. At one point one of the assailants shouted to those attempting to alert them, "That's not a child, it's a Judas doll." Witnesses reported seeing the child's body toppled over many times, bouncing against the pavement, the car's rear wheel, and several speed bumps along the route that the assailants took. When they passed in front of two different corner bars on the corners of Cândido Bastos and Silva Gomes streets and Barbosa and Florentina streets, patrons were horrified at what they were witnessing and shouted frantically at the car's occupants to stop the car. One man on a motorcycle chased the car to alert them that there was a child being dragged but was threatened with a gun held by a thief sitting in the passenger seat (later identified as 18-year-old Diego Nascimento da Silva); this incident occurred along Avenida Intendente Magalhães in the neighborhood of Campinho, which was illuminated with floodlights in preparation for the Rio Carnival. The motorcyclist later testified that once he got up close to the car he could see that João Hélio was already dead.

After the carjackers reached Bornéu street in Cascadura, they turned off onto Caiari street, a small dead-end road. There they parked the car and, according to a resident who recognized the group, got out, searched the car for valuables before disappearing down an alleyway of stairs that exits into Três Lagoas square in Cascadura, leaving João Hélio's body hanging from the car.

After the incident, the assailants went home to have dinner with their parents before attending a local church party. The family of one of the assailants turned them in once they found out the truth. Less than eight hours after the murder, the assailants were apprehended by the 30th Precinct of the Civil Police of Rio de Janeiro State. The assailants were all under the age of 23. One of them was under 18, the Brazilian age of criminal and civil responsibility for an adult. Details about the five who participated in the crime began to emerge in the media.

== Public reaction ==
Although Rio had historically suffered a high murder rate for several years prior to the murder, the nature of the crime and the young age of the victim resulted in statewide shock, particularly in the neighborhoods the assailants drove through. The crime sparked a series of public protests and debates throughout Brazil demanding an end to violence and amendments to the constitution and penal code to increase the punishment of criminals involved in brutal crimes.

As details of the crime emerged, there was outrage that the assailants never encountered police during the route that they drove. They passed by a military police station in Campinho, a fire station, a Brazilian Army barracks in Madureira, and several open-air corner bars. The lack of any police presence on the streets allowed the crime to occur without interference by law enforcement.

=== Homage at Maracanã ===
Less than a week after João Hélio's death, he was memorialized at a soccer game at Maracanã Stadium before a match between Botofogo and Flamengo.

Tribute banner by Brazilian soccer fans unfurled before match between Botofogo and Flamengo at Maracanã stadium, Rio de Janeiro, February 2007. In Portuguese it reads: João Hélio para sempre: O Rio chora por você (João Hélio forever: Rio weeps for you).

=== Solidarity march (Zona Norte) ===
Local residents, including some that joined the march as it passed, led a march on March 10, 2007 in solidarity, asking for peace and protesting against violence and impunity. Many of the marchers carried signs and banners honoring the child. João Hélio's parents walked front and center in the crowd. According to police estimates, about 500 people participated. The march occurred despite the hot weather that day, and it was reported that none of the marchers left the crowd due to the heat.

João Hélio's mother Rosa said at the time, "It's very painful to walk this path, but our community has given us a lot of strength." One of those who marched explained, "The important thing is to show up on the street to march, to speak out, and to learn. We can't just accept being passively massacred by violence and do nothing." During the march, 110 policemen were scattered along the route to provide protection. Rio's public security chief, José Mariano Beltrame, participated in the procession. Beltrame commented on the march, "The public security can't be put solely on the shoulders of the police forces. What the people are bravely doing in the street is a power of the public that is the very thing that can change the social paradigm of violence.

The route of the march followed the same route that the assailants had taken João Hélio in the stolen car. The marchers massed at the corner of João Vicente and Henrique de Melo streets, where the carjacking occurred, passing through four different neighborhoods and ending at Caiari street in Cascadura, where the car was abandoned.

== Sentencing ==
The assailants were sentenced by Judge Marcela Assad Karam on January 30, 2008, a week before the one-year anniversary of João Hélio's murder. Before sentencing, the judge gave a statement where she remarked that the assailants had all the windows rolled down in the car that day and that it would have been impossible to ignore the loud sounds of the child's body hitting against the side of the vehicle.

=== Profile of assailants ===
- Carlos Eduardo Toledo de Lima, age 23. Leader of the group and driver of the hijacked car. Went by the nickname "Dudu". He was the last to be taken into custody, and was arrested in Marechal Hermes, the neighborhood right next to Bento Ribeiro, where João Hélio's family had initially been the day of the hijacking. Sentenced to 45 years imprisonment.
- Diego Nascimento da Silva, age 18. Came out of the taxi pointing a handgun. Rode in the passenger seat. Was the assailant who aimed his handgun at the motorcyclist on Avenida Intendente Magalhãe. Lived near the square where the group parked and left the car. Diego's father gave police information as to where to find him. He was hiding out in a hill favela with his 16-year-old brother and Tiago. Sentenced to 44 years imprisonment. Imprisoned in penitentiary Bangu 2, where he ran a phone fraud ring with three other inmates, using cell phones to make up to 1000 calls per day to random people telling them that they are holding family members hostage and then demanding ransom money.
- Ezequiel Toledo de Lima, age 16. Younger brother of Carlos Eduardo. He was 16 at the time of the crime, and confessed to being responsible for shutting the car door on the seatbelt. He was the other assailant carrying a handgun. While he was incarcerated, he and two other juveniles attempted to murder a prison guard. He also attempted to escape. Released from prison in 2010 at the age of 19, he relocated to Iguaba Grande with the government's assistance after receiving death threats. In March 2012, Ezequiel was arrested for drug trafficking and being in possession of a stolen vehicle.
- Tiago de Abreu Matos, age 19. Was hiding out in the hillside favela with Diego and Ezequiel. Drove the taxi, which was owned by his father, to transport the three thieves for the carjacking. Sentenced to 39 years imprisonment.
- Carlos Roberto da Silva, age 21. He accompanied Tiago in transporting the three thieves to the carjacking. Sentenced to 39 years imprisonment.

== Aftermath ==
The crime intensified the discussion about what the “majority age” should be when judging criminals.

The barbaric crime sparked a wave of protest and solidarity in the population, particularly in the neighborhoods that the crime occurred. It led to a general discussion about the trivialization and devaluation of the preciousness of life. João Hélio's death was often cited in the media as an example of barbarity surfacing when street violence becomes endemic and is not sufficiently addressed.

=== João Hélio's funeral ===
João Hélio was buried at the Jardim da Saudade cemetery in Sulacap. João Hélio's casket was lowered into the ground surrounded by various family, relatives and friends. João Hélio's sister called out crying, "Little brother, forgive me for not being able to save you! I want my brother. I want my baby. I want to hear his voice." Rio's public security chief, José Mariano Beltrame, also attended the burial. The Jardim da Saudade cemetery was also the final resting place of murdered Rio journalist Tim Lopes, whose manner of death in 2002 (Lopes was tortured to death by drug traffickers) also shocked the Brazilian public and triggered a cry for change.

=== Candelária mass and downtown march ===
On February 14, 2007, hundreds of people, among them victims of crime and families affected by violence, participated in a mass at the Igreja da Candelária cathedral in Centro. Catholic leader Nixon Bezerra de Brito mentioned other brutal acts of violence that had occurred in recent years in Rio and declared that João Hélio was "a martyr in a city that doesn't know how to respect life." Following the mass, there was a protest march calling for peace and an end to violence. The march started with approximately 600 people and as others joined during the procession, the number reached about 1,600 people as they moved down Avenida Rio Branco.

=== Recognition by samba schools ===
Several samba schools paid homage to João Hélio during the 2007 carnaval procession in Rio's Sambadrome. The samba school Estácio de Sá entered the Sambadrome asking for a minute of silence in homage to João Hélio. Next, the samba school Mocidade Independente de Padre Miguel also paid respects to João Hélio before beginning the procession of the bateria (drum corps procession). Porto da Pedra unveiled a banner memorializing the child. Mangueira incorporated choreography by Carlinhos de Jesus in which participants were used to form the letters of João Hélio's name.

=== Parks dedicated to child ===
Rio's governor, Sérgio Cabral, named a large new park after João Hélio in the city of Araruama, which is 118 km (73 miles) from Rio de Janeiro. Named Parque Menino João Hélio, the park was dedicated to his memory with plaques and sculptures. One of the plaques is written with the exhortation "Dei a minha vida, em troca peço PAZ! - João Hélio" ("I have given my life, in exchange, I ask for peace!"). The park has various life-size sculptures by artist Luiz Costa that show the trajectory of the short life of João Hélio. Photos that were taken to capture the events of the park's inauguration also captured the profound sadness evident in the faces of João Hélio's parents.

Rio's municipal government changed the name of the square near where João Hélio's body was found in the neighborhood of Cascadura. Originally named Praça Três Lagoas, it was renamed Praça João Hélio Fernandes Vieites by Rio Mayor César Maia. A small playground was subsequently installed at the site.

=== Shooting in same location ===
Three months after João Hélio's death, on May 1, 2007, two policemen were murdered while patrolling João Vicente street, at the location where the carjacking had originally occurred. Their car was surrounded by armed gang members and sprayed with 30 bullets. The subsequent police response involved an assault on a large complex of favelas called the Complexo do Alemão (The German Complex) the following month.

== See also ==
- Dragging death
- List of kidnappings
- Murder of Pam Basu – Similar incident in Maryland where a woman was dragged by her stolen car and killed
- Murders of Channon Christian and Christopher Newsom – Similar incident in Tennessee where a couple was abducted and killed after a carjacking
