= Honório Gurgel =

- Neighborhood
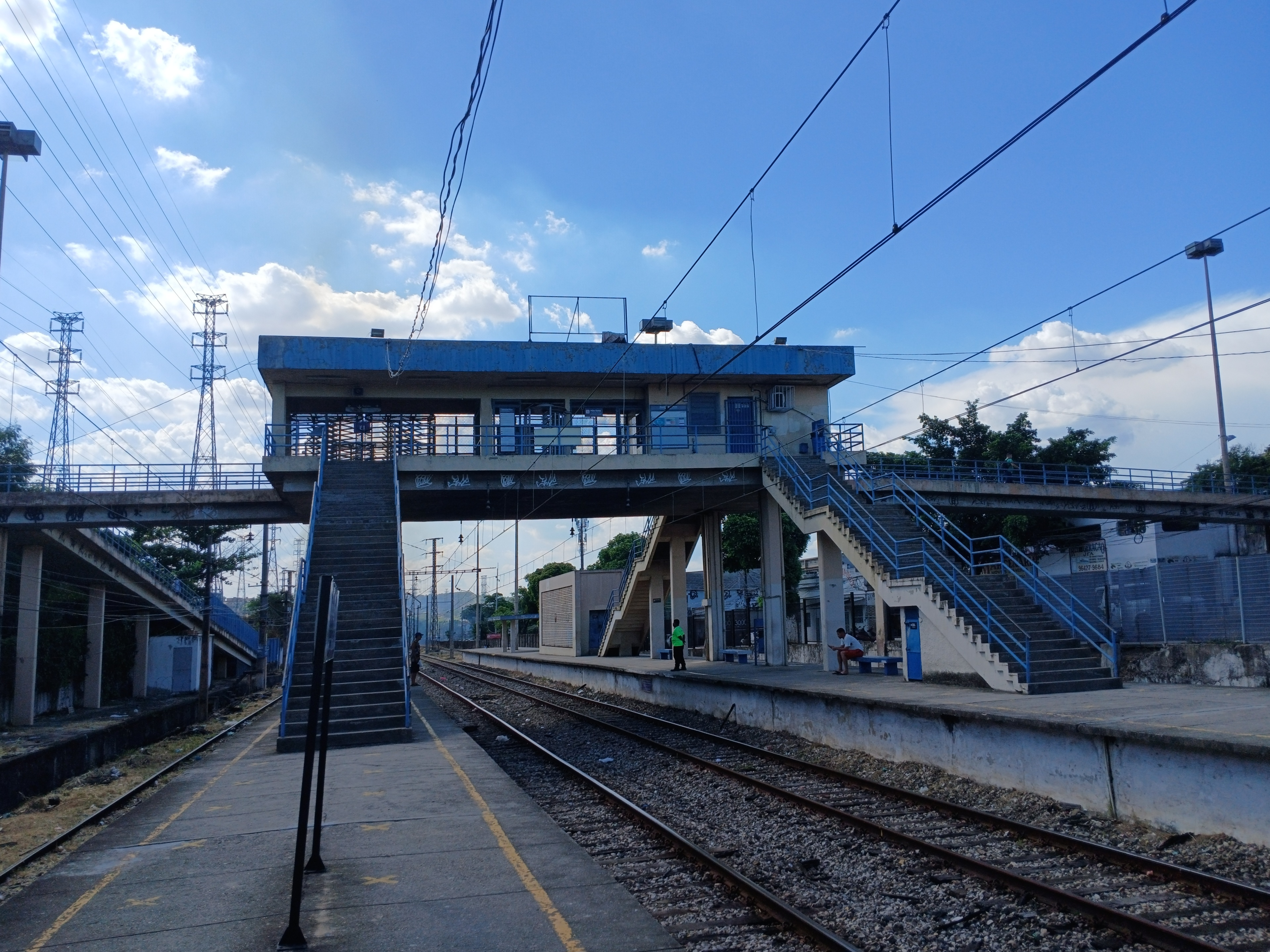
- Train station in Honório Gurgel

- Location in Rio de Janeiro Honório Gurgel (Brazil)
- Coordinates: 22°50′45″S 43°21′26″W
- Country: Brazil
- State: Rio de Janeiro (RJ)
- Municipality/City: Rio de Janeiro
- Zone: North Zone
- Founded: July 23, 1981

Area
  - Total: 13,748 km^{2} (5,308 sq mi)

Population (2010)
  - Total: 21,989

Honório Gurgel is a working class neighborhood located in the North Zone of Rio de Janeiro, Brazil. It borders the Rio de Janeiro neighborhoods of Rocha Miranda, Marechal Hermes, Bento Ribeiro, Coelho Neto, Barros Filho, and Guadalupe.

== History ==
The railway station Honório Gurgel was inaugurated in 1905 with the name of Munguengue. It took its current name, which has existed since the 1920s, on honour of a former mayor of the municipality of Rio de Janeiro.

Honório Gurgel is part of the XV Administrative Region (Madureira) of the city of Rio de Janeiro.

Famous Brazilian singer Anitta was born and raised in the neighborhood.
