= Black Music Action Coalition =

The Black Music Action Coalition (BMAC) is a Black activist organization. American record label executive Courtney Stewart was a founding member and serves on the executive committee for the nonprofit formed in 2020 to combat systemic racism in the music industry. American entertainment lawyer and artist rights advocate Dina LaPolt is also an active member on the Executive Leadership Council. Willie “Prophet” Stiggers, is co-founder, president, and CEO.

In April 2021, American country music singer/songwriter Morgan Wallen donated $300,000 to the Black Music Action Coalition in the names of 20 people who had counseled him following some "dumb stuff". Those individuals were given the option to funnel their respective $15,000 donations to a charity of their choice or keep the money within the BMAC.

In 2021, BMAC and hip hop music festival Rolling Loud partnered to promote social justice initiatives. In 2023, Rolling Loud hosted a panel discussion in support of their Restoring Artistic Protections (RAP) Act initiative on the first day of Rolling Loud Miami. The panel included Stiggers for BMAC, Rolling Loud co-founder Tariq Cherif, and congressmen Hank Johnson and Jamaal Bowman. The act was introduced as a way to protect artists' creative expression, which has been used against them as evidence in court.

Regarding Tennessee's ELVIS Act, Stiggers said: "Black Music Action Coalition supports this first-of-its-kind legislation, as the misuse of AI could devastate Black music creators who already face an uphill battle. Our priority is to amplify the larger justice movement in the music industry, and we commend Tennessee for setting the standard in AI protection legislation. We hope to see other states follow in Tennessee’s lead in order to protect the creative community."

== Music in Action awards ==
The Black Music Action Coalition's inaugural Music in Action Awards were presented in 2021 by The Weeknd. That year LaPolt herself was honored for her Black community activism as the recipient of BMAC's Agent of Change Award, alongside civil rights attorney Benjamin Crump. The Weeknd received the Quincy Jones Humanitarian Award.
