= Ironides Rodrigues =

Brazilian writer and Black activist (1923–1987)

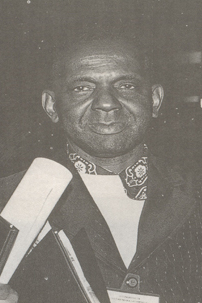
- Rodrigues in 1982
- Born: 7 September 1923; Uberlândia, Minas Gerais, Brazil
- Died: 18 July 1987 (aged 63); Rio de Janeiro, Brazil

Ironides Rodrigues (7 September 1923 – 18 July 1987) was a Brazilian writer and Black activist.

== Life ==
Ironides Rodrigues was born in Uberlândia, Minas Gerais, on 7 September 1923. He completed his lower secondary education there and, after moving to Rio de Janeiro in 1947, continued his studies at Colégio Pedro II, of which he would later become one of the leading teachers, and Colégio Universitário do Rio de Janeiro. To support himself in the city, Rodrigues lived in a boarding house where he worked as a domestic servant. After recognizing his intellectual abilities, the landlady relieved him of manual labor and hired him as a private tutor for her daughter and the other students living in the house. Upon graduating from the Faculty of Law, Rodrigues dedicated his degree to Black people, workers, marginalized gay people, persecuted prostitutes, and the Indigenous people of Brazil.

Rodrigues taught Latin, French, Portuguese, and literature. He also worked as a journalist and became a specialist in film criticism. Rodrigues published his work in newspapers such as Correio da Manhã, Vanguarda, and Quilombo. He was also a playwright, writing plays that addressed the experiences and struggles of Black Brazilians. His first staged play, Agonia do Sol (lit. 'Agony of the Sun'), was produced by Washington Guilherme. Alongside Abdias do Nascimento, Rodrigues was one of the founders and an important collaborator of Teatro Experimental do Negro. He also served as Secretary-General of the National Convention of Black Brazilians, at whose first congress he presented the thesis Estética e Negritude (lit. 'Aesthetics and Blackness').

== Death ==
Ironides Rodrigues died on 18 July 1987 at Souza Aguiar Hospital and was buried in Irajá Cemetery. He left behind two series of notebooks entitled Estética da Negritude (lit. 'Aesthetics of Blackness') and Diários de um Negro Atuante: Cadernos de Bento Ribeiro (lit. 'Diaries of an Active Black Man: Notebooks of Bento Ribeiro'). In his will, Rodrigues expressed the wish that the apartment where he lived, at 325 Picuí Street in the Bento Ribeiro neighborhood of Rio de Janeiro, be turned into a center for scholarship, with its collection of four thousand books made available to researchers and underprivileged students. He had no children.
