= Dragging death =

Particular cause of death

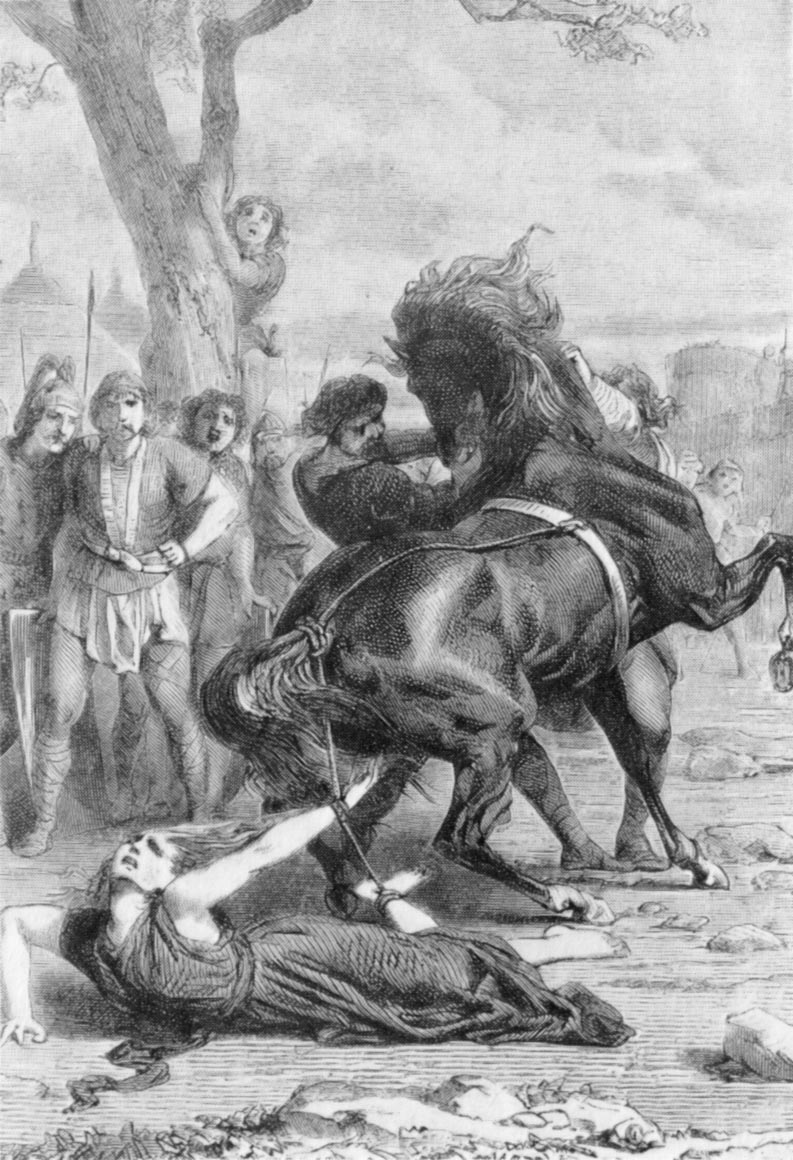
Execution of Brunhilda of Austrasia.

A dragging death is a death caused by someone being dragged behind or underneath a moving vehicle or animal, whether accidental or as a deliberate act of murder.

== Instances of dragging death ==
- Antonio Curcoa (1792; Chile)
- Pam Basu (1992; Maryland, US)
- James Byrd Jr. (1998; Texas, US)
- João Hélio (2007; Brazil)
- Brandon McClelland (2008; Texas, US)
- Mido Macia (2013; South Africa)
- Farkhunda Malikzada (2015; Afghanistan)
- Andrew Harper (2019; England)
- Anjali Singh (2023; India)

== See also ==
- Keelhauling
