= Murder of Mido Macia =

2013 police murder

- Macia handcuffed to the back of the police van before being murdered
- Location: Daveyton, Gauteng, South Africa
- Date: 26 February 2013
- Attack type: Police killing, murder by dragging
- Deaths: 1 (Emidio Josias "Mido" Macia)
- Perpetrators: Meschack Malele; Thamsanqa Ngema; Percy Mnisi; Bongumusa Mdluli; Sipho Ngobeni; Lungisa Gwababa; Bongane Kolisi; Linda Sololo
- Verdict: All found guilty
- Convictions: Murder
- Sentence: 15 years in prison

On 26 February 2013, Mido Macia, a 27-year old Mozambican immigrant, was murdered by eight police officers in the custody of the South African Police Service. He was dragged by a police vehicle in the township of Daveyton in Gauteng, South Africa, a few hours earlier. A crowd witnessed the dragging incident, one of whom filmed it. Police said Macia had caused a traffic jam and then resisted arrest. On 25 August 2015, eight former police officers were found guilty of Macia's murder in the North Gauteng High Court.

== Victim ==
Emidio Josias "Mido" Macia (c. 1985 – 26 February 2013) was a Mozambican immigrant and taxi driver who was murdered in the custody of the South African Police Service. Mido Macia spent the first ten years of his life in Matola, Mozambique. He came to South Africa seventeen years before his death. He had a wife and child and was also the legal guardian of his late brother's three children. He was described by the chair of the Benoni Taxi Association as "a very humble guy".

== Murder ==
According to the police, Macia had parked illegally, causing a traffic jam, and then resisted arrest. A preliminary post-mortem report released by South Africa's Independent Police Investigative Directorate indicated that Macia had died in police detention with head injuries and internal bleeding. He had been dragged behind a police van, after having been handcuffed to its rear, for about 500 metres.

The eight police officers involved were suspended on 28 February and arrested the following day on suspicion of murder. They were remanded on 12 March.

Originally scheduled for court Monday, 4 March 2013, the defendants did not appear, and court was cleared. The hearing was rescheduled pending an identity parade. On 12 March, they were all denied bail, partly for their own protection. At this hearing, it was suggested by the prosecution that Macia had died from being beaten once inside the police station.

On 25 August 2015, all eight former police officers were found guilty of murder in the North Gauteng High Court. They were each sentenced to 15 years in prison.

== See also ==
- Dragging death
