= Oswaldo Cruz, Rio de Janeiro =

Oswaldo Cruz
- Neighborhood
- Location in Rio de Janeiro Oswaldo Cruz (Brazil)
- Coordinates: 22°52′14″S 43°21′00″W
- Country: Brazil
- State: Rio de Janeiro (RJ)
- Municipality/City: Rio de Janeiro
- Zone: North Zone

Oswaldo Cruz is a neighborhood of the North Zone of Rio de Janeiro, of middle-class and lower middle-class situated near the neighborhoods of Madureira (east), Bento Ribeiro (west), Vila Valqueire (south), and Turiaçu (north). It is known nationally for being the birthplace of Portela, the great champion of the Carioca Carnival.

Cut by the railway, Oswaldo Cruz is a typically residential neighborhood, with approximately 40.000 residents.

One of the most popular events of Oswaldo Cruz is the "Train of Samba" (known in Portuguese as "Trem do Samba" or "Samba do Trem"), an event which starts at Central do Brasil and takes place inside of the train wagons. Participants play Samba from the starting station up to Oswaldo Cruz station, where other shows and events take place.

== History ==
The neighborhood was once part of the Parish of Irajá, created in 1644. In the end of the 19th century and beginning of 20th century, the economy of the region, supported by slavery, enters crisis and the old latifundiums start to be divided by the poor population, mainly by people escaping the urban reforms realized in the center of the city.

In 1890, the Dona Clara Station of trains was inaugurated, that gave name to the area of limits still not defined, that then was confused with Madureira. In 1917, with the death of the doctor and sanitary engineer Oswaldo Cruz, the local station is renamed and with along the time this name ends being attributed to the neighborhood. However until today in the neighborhood of Madureira there is a street with the name of Dona Clara.

It belonged to Dona Clara the Blocos of Dona Esther, "Quem Fala de Nós Come Mosca" (Who Talks About Us Eats Flies)., ancestral of Portela. In the 1920s, when Portela is founded, the neighborhood is already known as Oswaldo Cruz, that the first name of the council was Conjunto Oswaldo Cruz.
