= Death of Anjali Singh =

2023 road traffic collision death in India

- Location: Delhi
- Date: January 1, 2023
- Victim: Anjali Singh
- Accused: 5 vehicle occupants
- Charges: Causing death by negligence Culpable homicide

Anjali Singh was a 20-year-old Indian woman who was killed in a road traffic collision in Delhi on January 1, 2023. It is also known as the 2023 Delhi hit-and-run case, or the Kanjhawala case. Anjali was driving a scooter and was hit by a motorist. Her leg got stuck in the car's axle, after which she was dragged by the car for several kilometers, eventually resulting in her death.

The incident generated widespread national and international coverage and was widely condemned both in India and abroad. Additionally, there were public protests in Delhi against the central government for failing to provide adequate security for women.

== Background ==
Singh was born to her mother, Rekha Singh, as the second of six siblings who lived in the Mangolpuri area of Delhi. Singh's mother worked as an assistant in a school but lost her job during the COVID-19 pandemic. Her father had died eight years before her death in 2023.

Singh ended up not completing school in order to financially support her family by working as a make-up artist. She was very active on social media and Instagram Reels. Additionally, Singh used to work as an usher for an event management company at weddings for daily remuneration.

According to India Today, CCTV footage showed Singh in an accident on July 16, 2022, which she narrowly survived. That time, Singh was found to have consumed alcohol. Singh's friend, Nidhi, whom she was with on the day of her death, was also caught by Government Railway Police (GRP) in Agra in 2020 for a drug case under Narcotic Drugs and Psychotropic Substances Act, 1985, in which she later got bail. Later, Delhi Police found traffic challans worth 19,000 rupees pending against Nidhi.

== Death ==
Singh, along with her friend Nidhi, left Vivan Palace OYO hotel at around 1:30 a.m. on the morning of January 1, 2023 after attending a New Year's party. When travelling on her scooter in the Sultanpuri area of Delhi, she was struck by a grey Suzuki Baleno car. The car's five occupants panicked and didn't stop, dragging the body of Singh for several kilometers. The five occupants, who admitted being intoxicated with alcohol, were then arrested. (Before the hit-and-run, they had first gone to Haryana's Murthal for dhaba food to celebrate the new year.) Singh's friend, Nidhi, was the scooter's pillion rider, but she escaped unharmed.

The naked body of Singh was found near Hanuman Mandir at Jonti village in Sultanpuri. Her body was then sent to the Sanjay Gandhi Memorial Hospital in Mangolpuri, Delhi. An autopsy recorded the cause of Singh's death as "shock and haemorrhage due to injury to the head, spine, left femur and both lower limbs" and noted 40 injuries on her body.

== Investigation ==
=== Autopsy ===
A medical board of doctors at the Maulana Azad Medical College (MAMC) conducted Singh's autopsy and reported that there were a total of 40 injuries. The autopsy report mentioned brain matter missing, skull open, and spine broken.

Singh's autopsy has also ruled out the possibility of a sexual assault.

=== Arrests ===
Delhi Police arrested the five accused within 3 hours of the body being found, specifically with the help of two automatic number-plate recognition (ANPR) cameras that captured their car with the registration DL8CAY6414.

The five accused men arrested were Amit Khanna (25), Krishan (27), Mithun (26), Manoj Mittal (27), and Deepak Khanna (26). They were intoxicated at the time of the incident. Mittal was affiliated to the Bharatiya Janata Party (BJP) and was co-convener of the Mongolpuri ward, as well as a ration dealer in Sultanpuri. Amit Khanna worked with SBI Card in Uttam Nagar. Krishan worked at the Spanish Culture Centre in Connaught Place. Mithun was a hairdresser at Naraina. Deepak Khanna was a Gramin Sewa driver.

CCTV footage later emerged, showing the girl being dragged under the five accused men's car. The video was from January 1, 2023, at 2:13 a.m., shortly after the accident. According to an eyewitness named Deepak Dahiya, who runs a confectionery shop at the Kanjhawala Road in Ladpur Village, the car took a U-turn after hitting the scooter. Dahiya then chased the car with his motorcycle and was in contact with the police. Singh's friend Nidhi stated that the accused kept on driving the car deliberately while Singh was screaming. Nidhi also said that Singh was drunk on that day but insisted driving the scooter.

On January 5, 2023, Delhi Police named two more accused men: Ashutosh and Ankush Khanna. Ashutosh is the brother-in-law of the vehicle owner, Lokesh, while Ankush is the brother of one of the accused. Ankush was later granted bail on furnishing a personal bond of 20,000 rupees along with one surety. It was Amit Khanna who was allegedly driving the car while Deepak Khanna (a cousin of Ankush and Amit Khanna) was at his house at the time of the accident. None of the other four men in the car had a driving license.

Delhi police added Section 201 of the Indian Penal Code (IPC) to the First Information Report (FIR) for destruction of evidence. Additionally, Ministry of Home Affairs asked the Delhi Police to invoke Section 302 of the IPC against the accused. On April 1, 2023, Delhi Police filed an 800-page chargesheet in Kanjhawala Case, in which four out of the seven accused—Amit Khanna, Krishan, Mithun, and Manoj Mittal—were charged with murder.

== Aftermath ==
Delhi Chief Minister Arvind Kejriwal announced financial assistance of Rs 10 lakh to the victim's family. Shah Rukh Khan‘s Meer Foundation has also extended financial aid to Anjali’s family.

Delhi Commission for Women chairperson Swati Maliwal cautioned against "victim-shaming" of Singh and said that her friend's account should be verified. Former IPS Officer Kiran Bedi said the current police response system in Delhi has collapsed and thus called for a revival of the earlier police response system through police control room vans.

Singh's family has made claims that she was the subject of a sexual assault due to her body being found naked. Police have rejected this allegation, stating that the post-mortem examination didn't support the allegation.

On January 3, 2023, a delegation of 12 Aam Aadmi Party legislators, led by Greater Kailash Member of the Legislative Assembly (MLA) Saurabh Bhardwaj along with Kalkaji MLA Atishi Marlena, met Delhi Police Commissioner Sanjay Arora and submitted a memorandum with five demands. The demands included the removal of Deputy Commissioner of Police Harendra K Singh. Later, on Ministry of Home Affairs's recommendations, 11 Delhi policemen were suspended.
