= Keelhauling =

Form of punishment for sailors

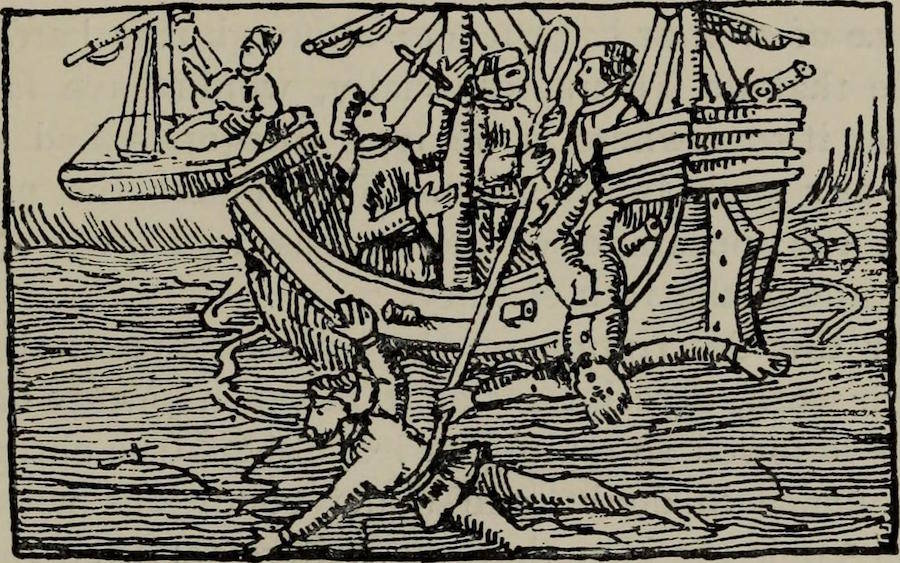
Tudor era woodcut print of keelhauling

Keelhauling (Dutch kielhalen; "to drag along the keel") is a form of punishment and potential execution once meted out to sailors at sea. A line was looped around the keel from one side of the ship to the other, with one end tied to the victim and the other end held by sailors. The victim was then thrown overboard; as sailors pulled from the other side, the victim was dragged, scraped, and mangled against the ship's keel, passing underneath the ship until pulled back up on deck.

== History ==
There is limited evidence that keelhauling in this form was used by pirate ships, especially in the ancient world. The earliest definitive mention of keelhauling is from the Byzantine Rhodian Maritime Code (Lex Rhodia), of c. 700 AD, which outlines punishment for piracy. However, there are images on c. 500 BC Greek vases, as well as a mention in Herodotus' Histories, that either refer to strappado — that is, hanging the victim over the water — or of a keelhauling proper. A footnote in one source suggests that it may have evolved from the medieval punishment of ducking.

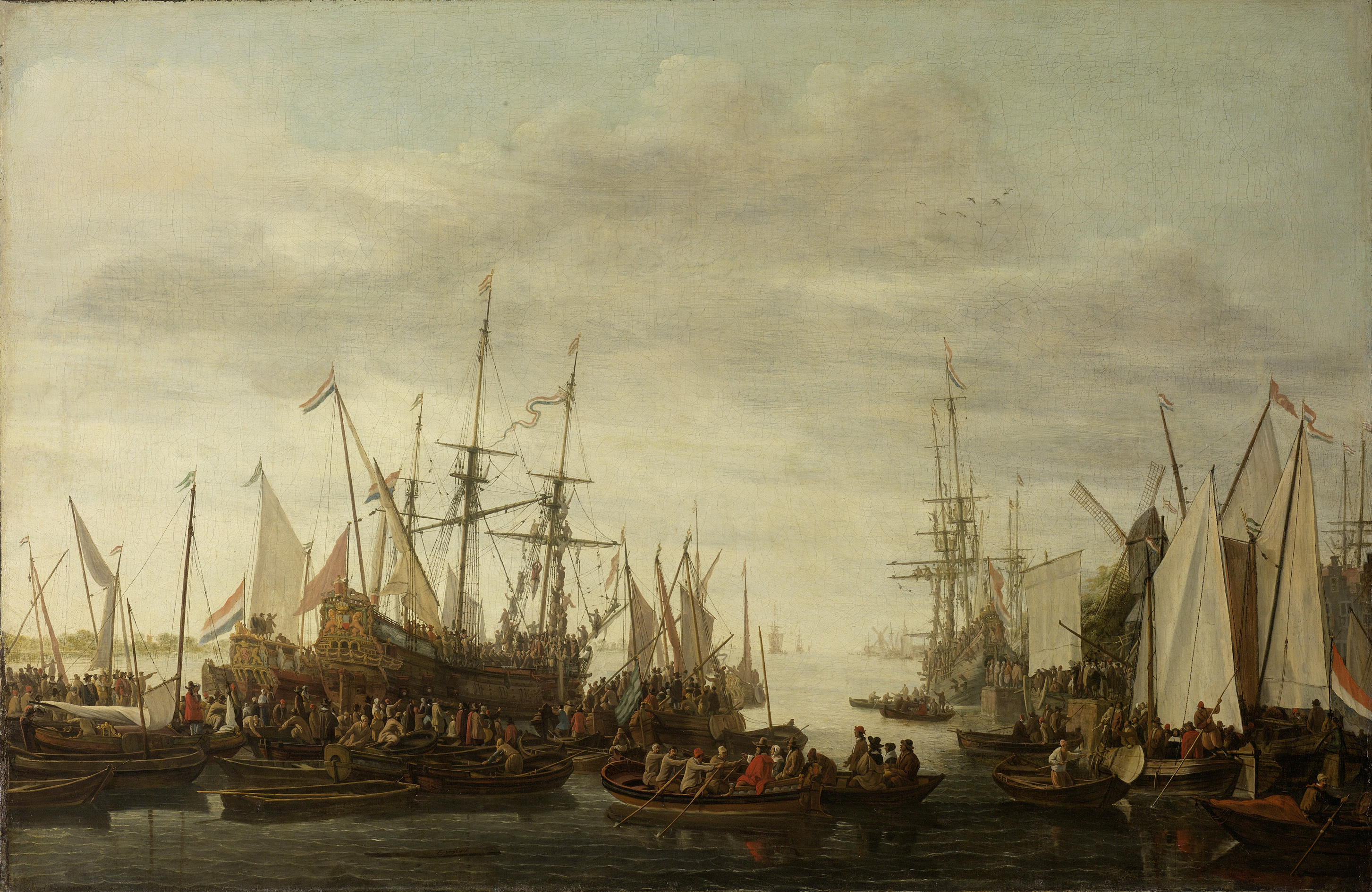
1660–1686 painting of a man being keelhauled

Several 17th-century English writers such as William Monson and Nathaniel Boteler recorded the use of keelhauling on English naval ships. In 1880, George Shaw Lefevre was confronted in Parliament with a recent report from Italy of a keelhauling on HMS Alexandra, and denied that such an incident had taken place.

Some historians believe keelhauling may have been introduced to the Dutch States Navy by William of Orange. On 11 October 1652, under Jan van Riebeeck's command, Jan Blank, a sailor, was keelhauled, whipped a total of 150 lashes, and then enslaved for 2 years as punishment for deserting the Dutch East India Company for nine days. Perhaps the most graphic incident of it occurred in 1673 when Cornelis Evertsen the Youngest punished sailors who committed murder. It was an official, though rare, punishment in the Dutch States Navy.

Use of the term persists in a largely metaphorical sense today, typically to describe a severe punishment or rebuke.

== See also ==
- Dragging death
- Running the gauntlet
- Walking the plank
- Operation Keelhaul
