= 2000 Brazilian census =

Census of Brazil

Eleventh census of Brazil
← 1991	1 August 2000	2010 →

General information
- Country: Brazil
- Authority: Brazilian Institute of Geography and Statistics (IBGE)

Results
- Total population: 169,590,693 (▲15.43%)
- Most populous state: São Paulo (36,969,476)
- Least populous state: Roraima (324,152)

The 2000 Brazilian census was the eleventh census conducted in Brazil. It was organized by the Brazilian Institute of Geography and Statistics (IBGE) and took place on 1 August 2000. The Brazilian population rose by 15.43% compared to the previous census in 1991, from 146,917,459 to 169,590,693.

== Purpose ==
=== Monitoring population characteristics ===
The census is used to monitor the growth, geographic distribution, and evolution of characteristics of the population over time.

=== Political representation ===
The population results of this census were used to determine the number of federal deputies for each state. They were also used to assist in determining the number of state deputies and city councilors.

=== Resource allocation ===
The census identified priority areas for investment in terms of health, education, housing, transport, energy, childcare, and old age programs. This information allowed for the examination of resource allocation from the National Health Fund (FNS), the National Education Fund (FNE), and other private and public sources.

=== Stimulus programs ===
The census data was used to identify locations that needed stimulus programs for economic growth and social development.

=== Identify areas of diagnosis ===
The information gathered by the census was used to identify and bring to the attention of state or municipal governments areas of diagnosis, such as insufficient water and sewage networks, medical care, and schooling.

== Population by federal unit and region ==
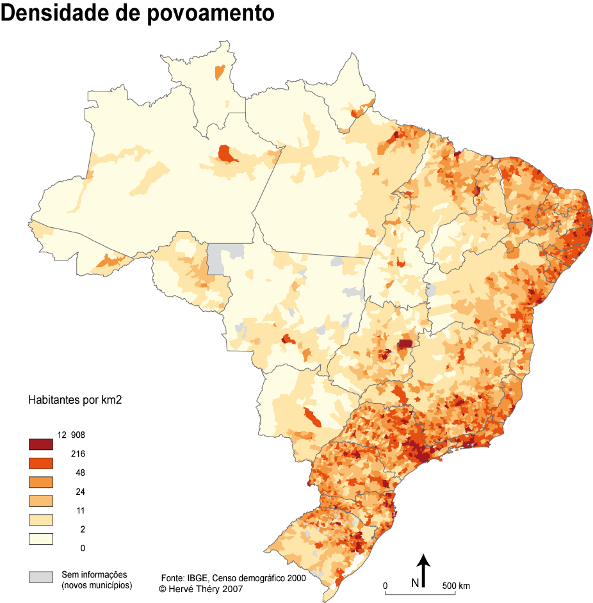
Population density

Population and population change in Brazil by federal unit
Rank	Federal Unit	Population as of 1991 census	Population as of 2000 census	Change	Percent change	Percent of Brazil
1	São Paulo	31,546,473	36,969,476	▲5,423,003	▲17.19%	21.80%
2	Minas Gerais	15,731,961	17,866,402	▲2,134,441	▲13.57%	10.54%
3	Rio de Janeiro	12,783,761	14,367,083	▲1,583,322	▲12.39%	8.47%
4	Bahia	11,855,157	13,066,910	▲1,211,753	▲10.22%	7.70%
5	Rio Grande do Sul	9,135,479	10,181,749	▲1,046,270	▲11.45%	6.00%
6	Paraná	8,443,299	9,558,454	▲1,115,155	▲13.21%	5.64%
7	Pernambuco	7,122,548	7,911,937	▲789,389	▲11.08%	4.67%
8	Ceará	6,362,620	7,418,476	▲1,055,856	▲16.59%	4.37%
9	Pará	5,181,570	6,189,550	▲1,007,980	▲19.45%	3.65%
10	Maranhão	4,929,029	5,642,960	▲713,931	▲14.48%	3.33%
11	Santa Catarina	4,538,248	5,349,580	▲811,332	▲17.88%	3.15%
12	Goiás	4,012,562	4,996,439	▲983,877	▲24.52%	2.95%
13	Paraíba	3,200,677	3,439,344	▲238,667	▲7.46%	2.03%
14	Espírito Santo	2,598,505	3,094,390	▲495,885	▲19.08%	1.82%
15	Piauí	2,581,215	2,841,202	▲259,987	▲10.07%	1.68%
16	Alagoas	2,512,991	2,819,172	▲306,181	▲12.18%	1.66%
17	Amazonas	2,102,901	2,813,085	▲710,184	▲33.77%	1.66%
18	Rio Grande do Norte	2,414,121	2,771,538	▲357,417	▲14.81%	1.63%
19	Mato Grosso	2,022,524	2,502,260	▲479,736	▲23.72%	1.48%
20	Mato Grosso do Sul	1,778,741	2,074,877	▲296,136	▲16.65%	1.22%
21	Distrito Federal	1,598,415	2,043,169	▲444,754	▲27.82%	1.20%
22	Sergipe	1,491,867	1,781,714	▲289,847	▲19.43%	1.05%
23	Rondônia	1,130,874	1,377,792	▲246,918	▲21.83%	0.81%
24	Tocantins	920,116	1,155,913	▲235,797	▲25.63%	0.68%
25	Acre	417,165	557,226	▲140,061	▲33.57%	0.33%
26	Amapá	288,690	475,843	▲187,153	▲64.83%	0.28%
27	Roraima	215,950	324,152	▲108,202	▲50.11%	0.19%

Population and population change in Brazil by region
Rank	Region	Population as of 1991 census	Population as of 2000 census	Change	Percent change	Percent of Brazil
1	Southeast	62,660,700	72,297,351	▲9,636,651	▲15.38%	42.63%
2	Northeast	42,470,225	47,693,253	▲5,223,028	▲12.30%	28.12%
3	South	22,117,026	25,089,783	▲2,972,757	▲13.44%	14.79%
4	North	10,257,266	12,893,561	▲2,636,295	▲25.70%	7.60%
5	Central-West	9,412,242	11,616,745	▲2,204,503	▲23.42%	6.85%
Brazil		146,917,459	169,590,693	▲22,673,234	▲15.43%	100%
