= Bento Ribeiro =

Brazilian military officer and politician (1856–1921)

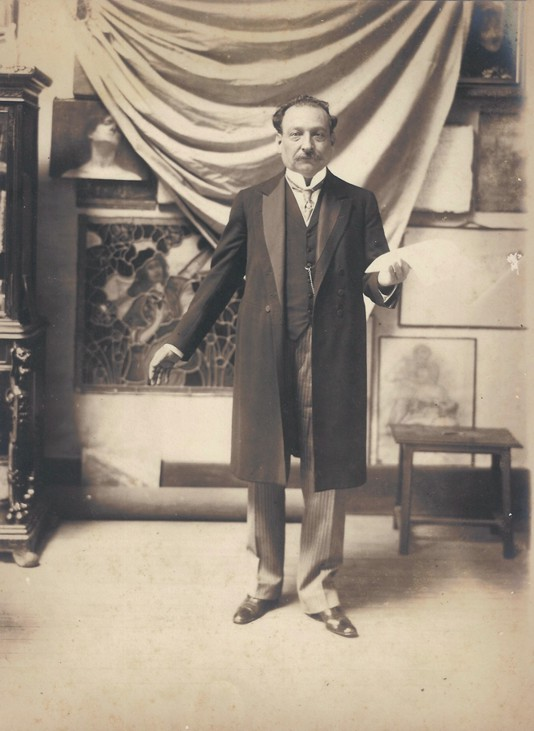
- Ribeiro by Eliseu Visconti

Mayor of the Federal District
- In office 15 November 1910 – 15 November 1914
- President: Hermes da Fonseca
- Preceded by: Serzedelo Correia
- Succeeded by: Rivadávia Correia

Personal details
- Born: Bento Manuel Ribeiro Carneiro Monteiro; 20 September 1856 Jaguarão, Rio Grande do Sul, Brazil
- Died: 28 August 1921 (aged 64) Rio de Janeiro, Federal District, Brazil
- Resting place: São João Batista Cemetery; 22.96002°S 43.18843°W
- Spouse: Isabel Machado
- Children: 3
- Parent: Vitorino José Monteiro (father)
- Relatives: Bento Manuel Ribeiro (grandfather); Vitorino Monteiro (brother)
- Occupation: Military officer; politician
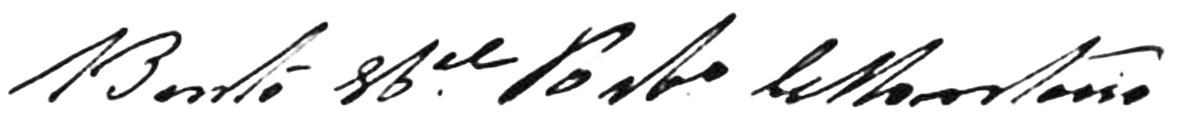
- Signature

Bento Manuel Ribeiro Carneiro Monteiro (20 September 1856 – 28 August 1921) was a Brazilian military officer and politician. He served as the mayor of Rio de Janeiro, then the Federal District, from 15 November 1910 to 15 November 1914, succeeding Serzedelo Correia and being succeeded by Rivadávia Correia. Ribeiro was the maternal grandson of Bento Manuel Ribeiro, son of Vitorino José Carneiro Monteiro, Baron of São Borja, and brother of Vitorino Monteiro.

== Early life ==
Bento Manuel Ribeiro Carneiro Monteiro was born on 20 September 1856 in Jaguarão, Rio Grande do Sul, (Note: Other sources give São Borja as his birthplace.) to Lieutenant General Vitorino José Carneiro Monteiro, Baron of São Borja, and Benevuta Amália Ribeiro. Bento Ribeiro was a member of a prominent family of Brazilian military officers; his father, who had been awarded the Gold Military Medal and granted the title of baron for his military merits, is considered one of the most important cavalry officers in the Brazilian Army, while Bento Ribeiro's maternal grandfather, Bento Manuel Ribeiro, is regarded as a legendary military officer and rancher who, also for his military merits, was granted rights to large tracts of land in the region of Alegrete, Rio Grande do Sul. Bento Ribeiro was also the brother of Vitorino Monteiro.

== Military career ==
Bento Ribeiro attained the rank of marshal, the highest in the Brazilian Army, on 7 January 1920, and was awarded the Silver Military Medal on 25 May 1903.

On 14 November 1904, an attempted coup d'état was launched by Senator Lauro Sodré, Congressman Alfredo Varela, and General Silvestre Rodrigues da Silva Travassos. At the time, Bento Ribeiro was commander of the 2nd Engineer Battalion and played a significant role in defending the government. For this, he received a commendation from the minister of war and was appointed commander of Escola Preparatoria e de Tactica de Realengo, the military focal point of the coup, where he remained for two years without any enemies.

Bento Ribeiro's life is connected to that of the communist revolutionary Luís Carlos Prestes. After Prestes's father died in 1908 and the family moved from Botafogo to Andaraí, Prestes took the entrance examination for Colégio Militar. Despite passing the examination, he was unable to gain admission because of a lack of "political" backing ( pistolão). On his second or third attempt, his mother, Leocádia, sought the intervention of Bento Ribeiro, a colleague of her late husband, who secured Prestes's admission in May 1909.

== Mayor of Rio de Janeiro (1910–1914) ==
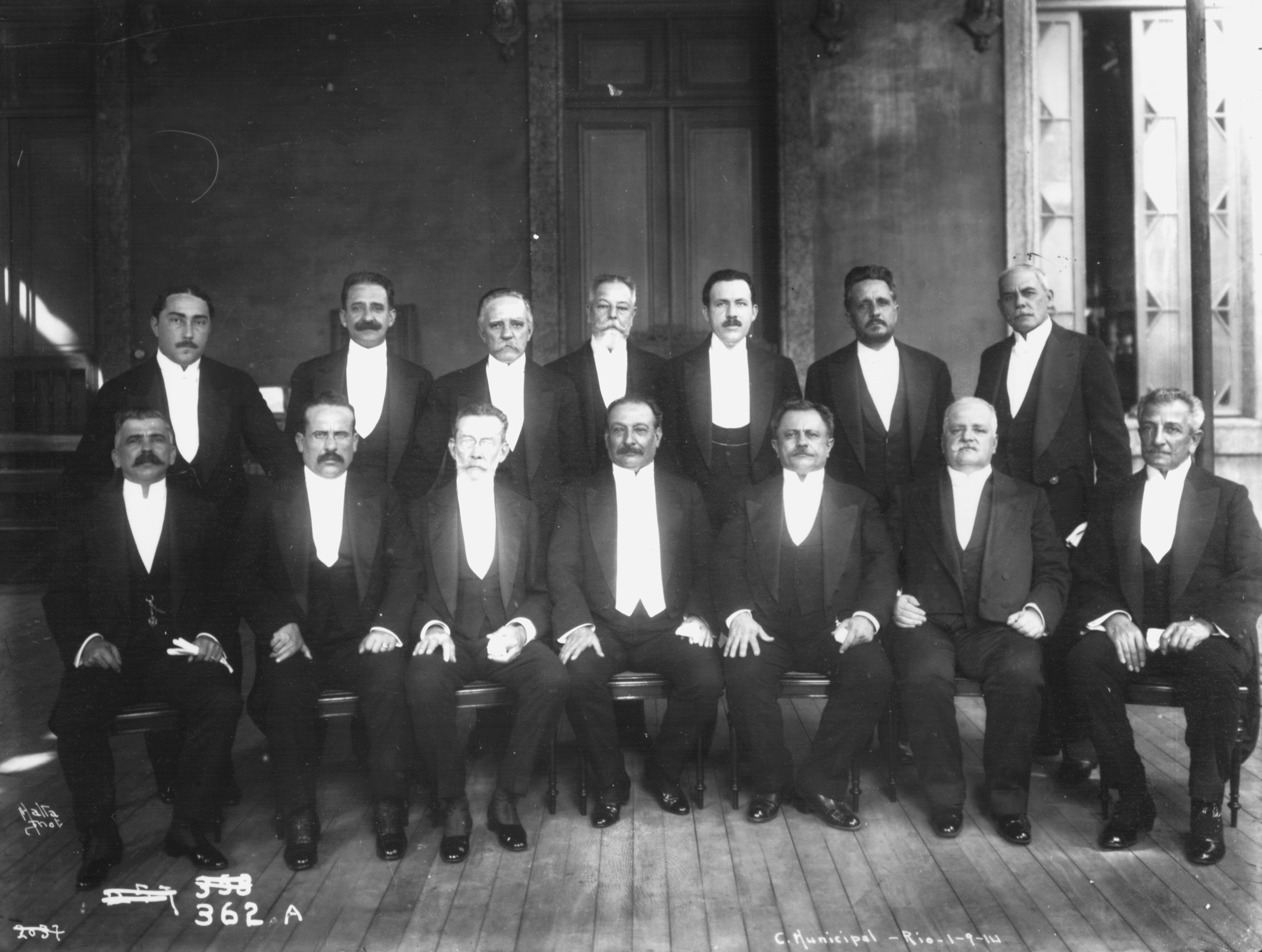
Bento Ribeiro and the municipal intendants in 1914, photographed by Augusto Malta

Bento Ribeiro was the mayor of Rio de Janeiro, then the Federal District, from 15 November 1910 to 15 November 1914, (Note: The beginning of his term is also given as 16 November 1910, while its end is also given as 14 and 16 November 1914.) appointed by President Hermes da Fonseca. He succeeded Serzedelo Correia and was succeeded by Rivadávia Correia. This was the only public office Bento Ribeiro held, and he became the first mayor to complete a full four-year term. Bento Ribeiro is considered to have consolidated the new role the then–capital of Brazil came to play following the major reforms of Pereira Passos and Sousa Aguiar.

In education, Bento Ribeiro continued initiatives begun by Sousa Aguiar, such as the establishment of night schools, which were opened to women following a reform in 1911. Enrollment in these schools increased from 613 in 1910 to 6,422 in 1914, while the share of school-age children enrolled in public primary education rose from 34% to 41%, suggesting a real increase in the number of children with access to public education.

=== Municipal intendants ===
1st district

- Gabriel Ozorio de Almeida
- Almerindo Thomaz Malcher Bacelllar
- Zoroastro Cunha
- Eduardo José Pereira Raboeira
- Salvador Ferreira Fontes
- Joaquim Antonio Silva Brandão
- Manoel Rodrigues Alves

2nd district

- Angelo Tavares
- José Clarimundo Nobre de Mello
- José Mendes Tavares
- Francisco Pinto da Fonseca Telles
- Pedro Pereira de Carvalho
- Honorio dos Santos Pimentel
- Alberico Dias de Moraes
- Antonio Rodrigues Campos Sobrinho

Executive board

- President – Gabriel Ozorio de Almeida
- Vice president – Zoroastro Cunha
- 1st secretary – José Clarimundo Nobre de Mello (died in 1912)
- 1st secretary – Almerindo Thomaz Malcher Bacelllar (as of the 4th quarter of 1912)
- 1st secretary – Alberico Dias de Moraes (as of the 2nd quarter of 1913)
- 2nd secretary – Almerindo Thomaz Malcher Bacelllar
- 2nd secretary – Salvador Ferreira Fontes (replaced as of the 4th quarter of 1912)
- 2nd secretary – Manoel Rodrigues Alves (as of the 2nd half of 1913)

== Later life and death ==
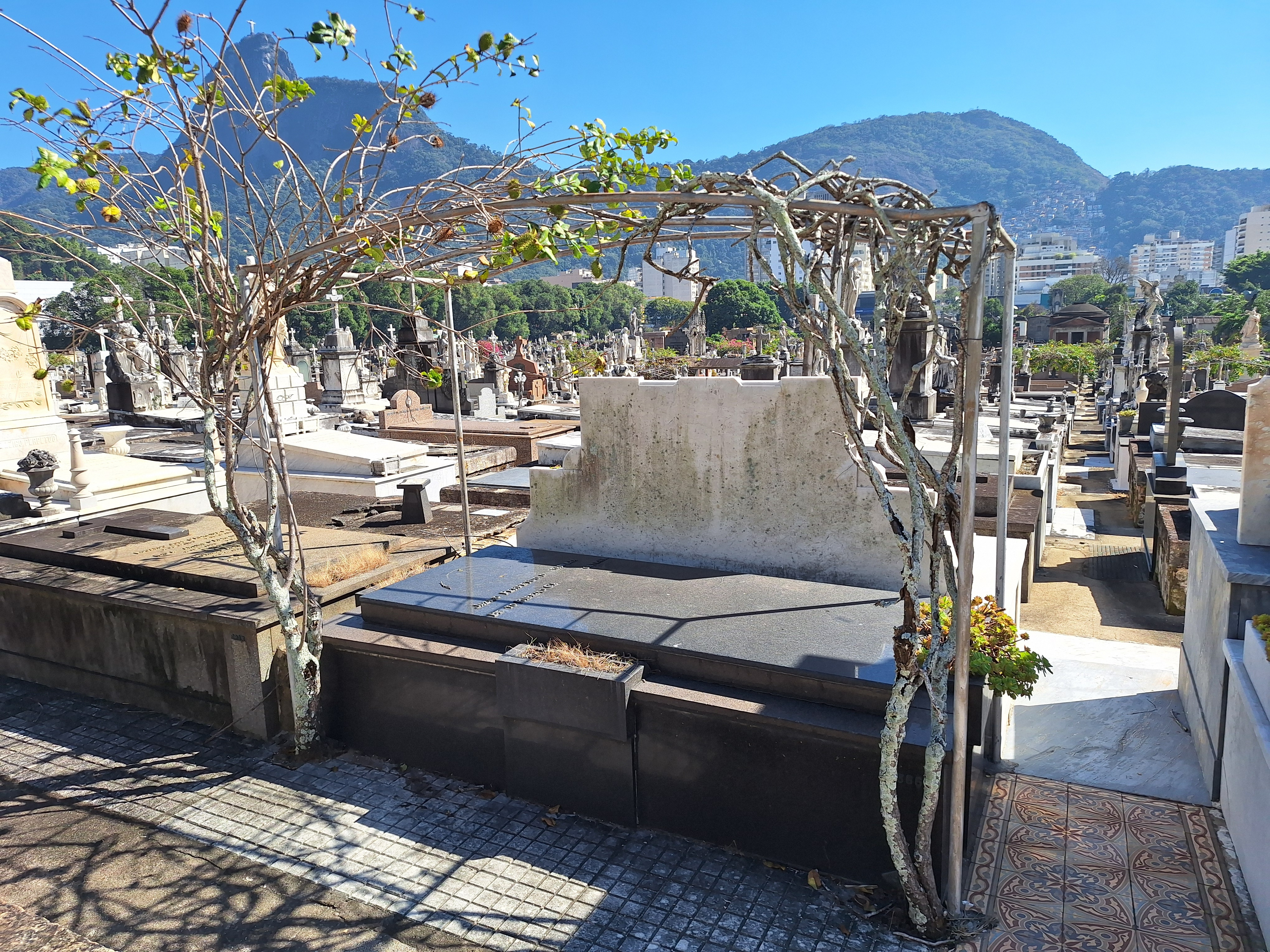
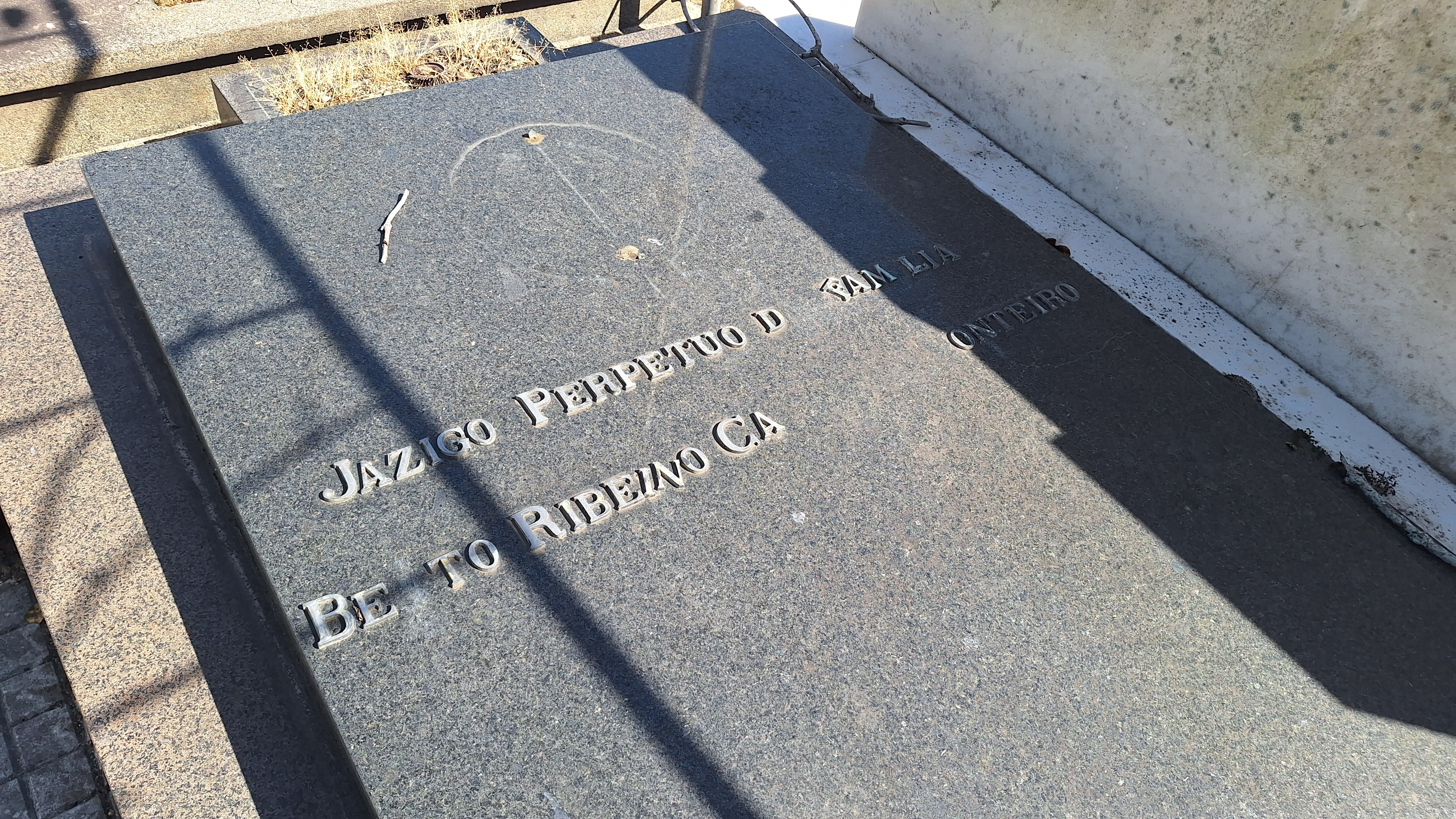
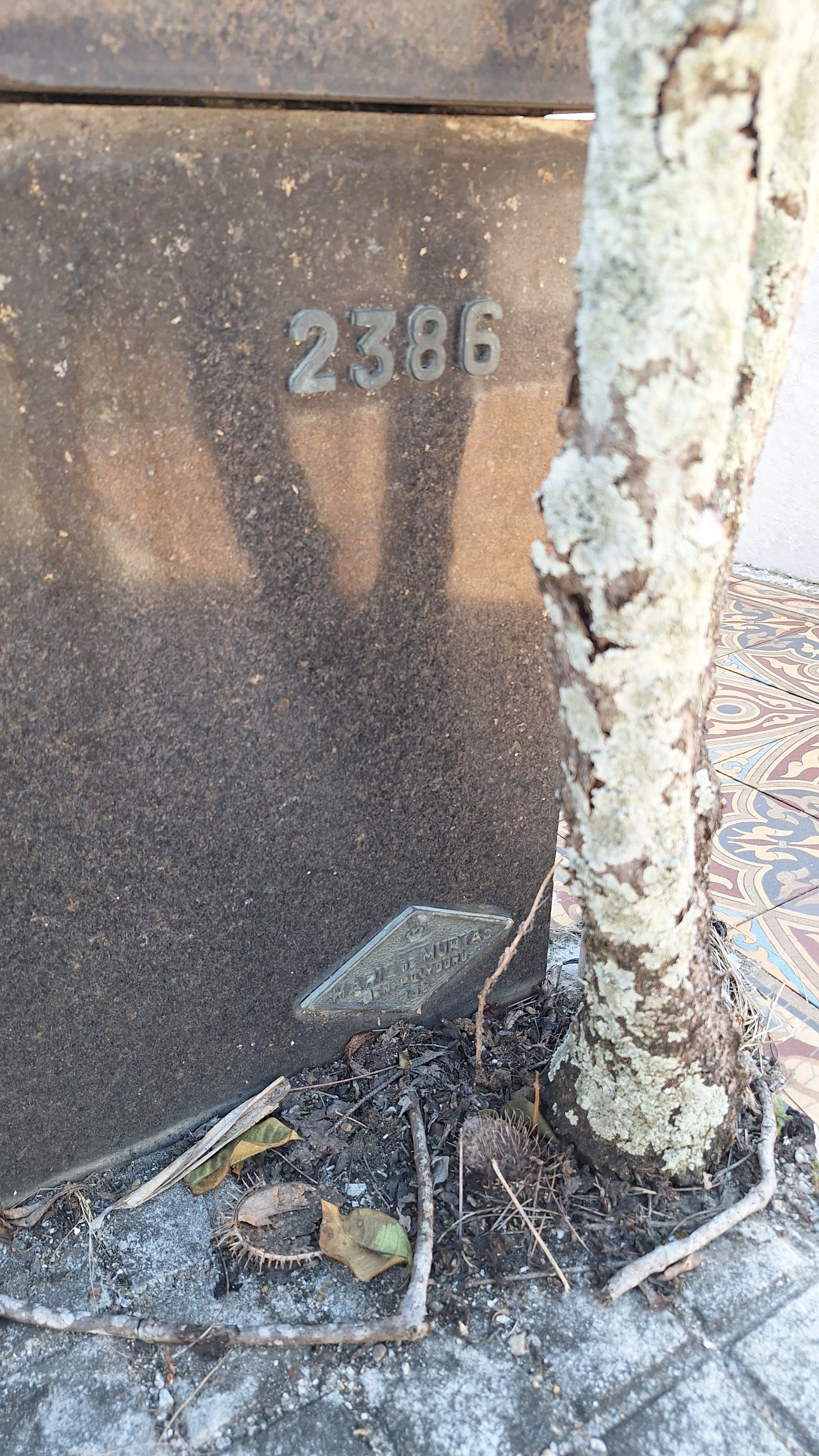
Family tomb of Bento Ribeiro, located in what is now group 39

About 15 days before his death, Bento Ribeiro contracted influenza, which worsened and developed into pneumonia. He died of cardiac collapse at 8:30 p.m. on 28 August 1921 at his residence, 30 Correia Dutra Street, in Catete. The following day, at 10:00 a.m., Ribeiro's remains were transferred from his home to a church in Glória, where a funeral Mass was held with his body present. He was subsequently buried at São João Batista Cemetery, in group 6, vault no. 2,386. Ribeiro was survived by his wife, one daughter, and two sons.

== Personal life ==
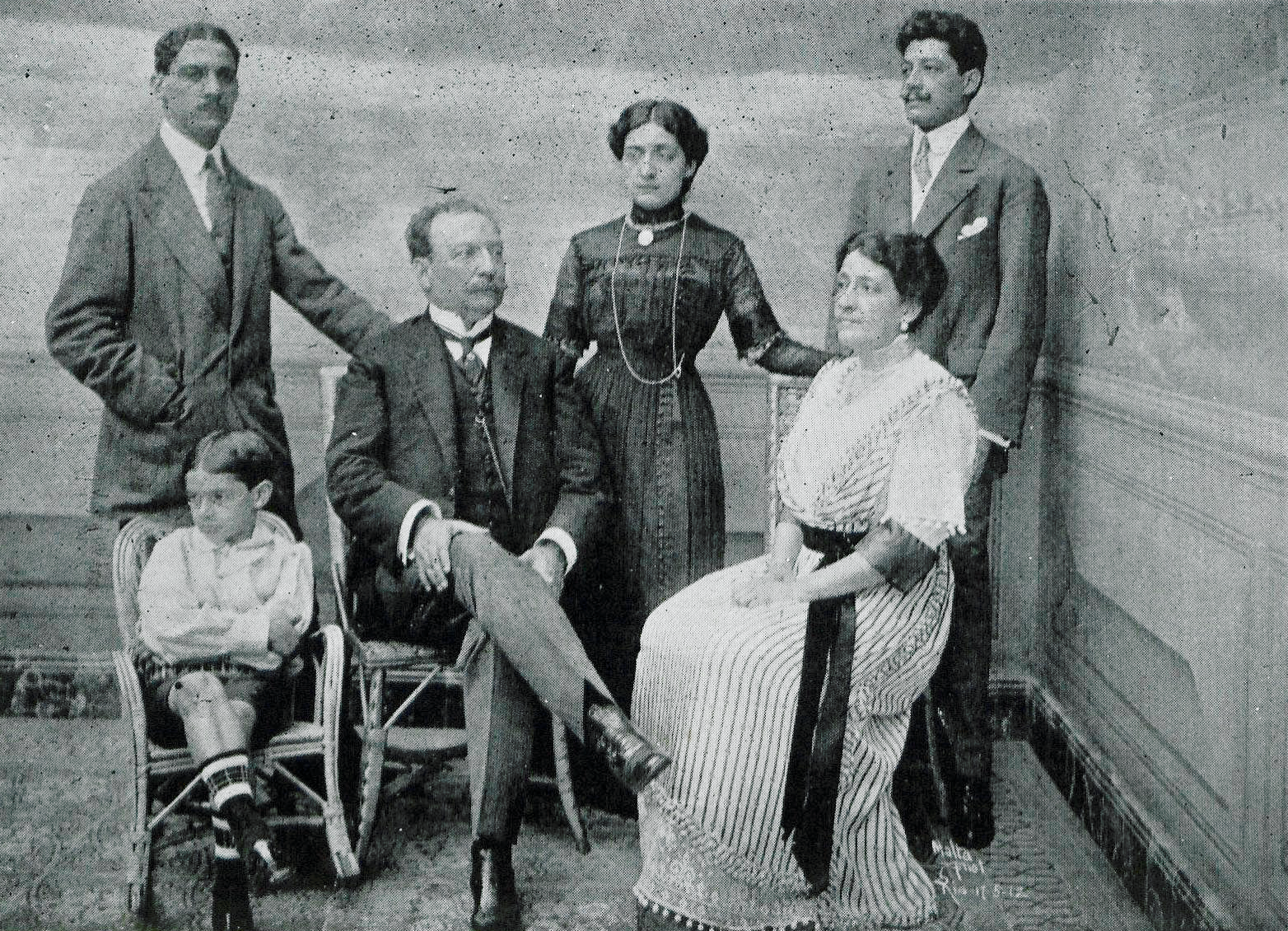
Bento Ribeiro with his wife, children, and a grandson in the early 1910s, photographed by Augusto Malta

Bento Ribeiro was married to Isabel Machado, with whom he had three children: consumption tax inspector João Ribeiro Carneiro Monteiro, who was unmarried as of 1937; aviation major Bento Ribeiro Carneiro Monteiro, who married Lavínia Schilling; and Maria Luísa Carneiro Monteiro, who married military physician Aristarco Dantas, after whose death she entered a religious order and took vows.

Isabel Machado Carneiro Monteiro died on 25 July 1954, aged 94, at her home, 310 Barão de Jaguaribe Street, and was buried at São João Batista Cemetery. Maria Luísa died on 9 December 1956, aged 73, leaving one son, José Bento Ribeiro Dantas, a figure associated with the urban and administrative development of Búzios. João died on 26 April 1958, aged 73; he was married but left no children. The younger Bento died on 23 August 1963, aged 71, leaving six children.

== Bibliography ==
- Carvalho, Mario Teixeira (1937). Nobiliario Sul-Riograndense [Rio Grande do Sul Nobiliary] (in Portuguese). Porto Alegre: Livraria do Globo.
- Pinheiro, Manoel Carlos (2010). Bento Ribeiro: 1910–1914. Coleção Prefeitos do Rio (in Portuguese). Vol. 7 (1st ed.). Rio de Janeiro: Instituto Municipal de Urbanismo Pereira Passos. ISBN 978-85-87649-19-5.
- Prestes, Anita Leocadia (2015). Luiz Carlos Prestes: um comunista brasileiro [Luiz Carlos Prestes: a Brazilian communist] (in Portuguese) (1st ed.). São Paulo: Boitempo. ISBN 978-85-7559-449-0.

Political offices
Preceded by Serzedelo Correia	Mayor of Rio de Janeiro; 1910–1914	Succeeded by Rivadávia Correia
