= Marechal Hermes =

- Neighborhood
- Location in Rio de Janeiro Marechal Hermes (Brazil)
- Coordinates: 22°51′43″S 43°22′15″W
- Country: Brazil
- State: Rio de Janeiro (RJ)
- Municipality/City: Rio de Janeiro
- Zone: North Zone

Population (2010)
  - Total: 48,061 (17,345 residences)

Marechal Hermes is a planned middle class neighborhood located in the North Zone of Rio de Janeiro, Brazil, founded on May 1, 1913. Surrounding neighborhoods include Bento Ribeiro, Campo dos Afonsos, Vila Valqueire, Deodoro and Guadalupe. It takes its name after Brazil's former president Marechal Hermes da Fonseca.

Marechal Hermes, it is a neighborhood with Portuguese architecture, as a large number of Portuguese people migrated to the neighborhood.

The neighborhood's train station was preserved as a national heritage site, as it is a beautiful Portuguese architectural work, which had bronze gates in the Lusitanian style.

As of 2000, its HDI is 0.814; the 36th position of the city out of 126.

It contains wide avenues, a theatre, a large hospital, a big church and several schools. Many of its original inhabitants were military men in view of the army and airforce headquarters nearby in Deodoro and Campo dos Afonsos respectively.

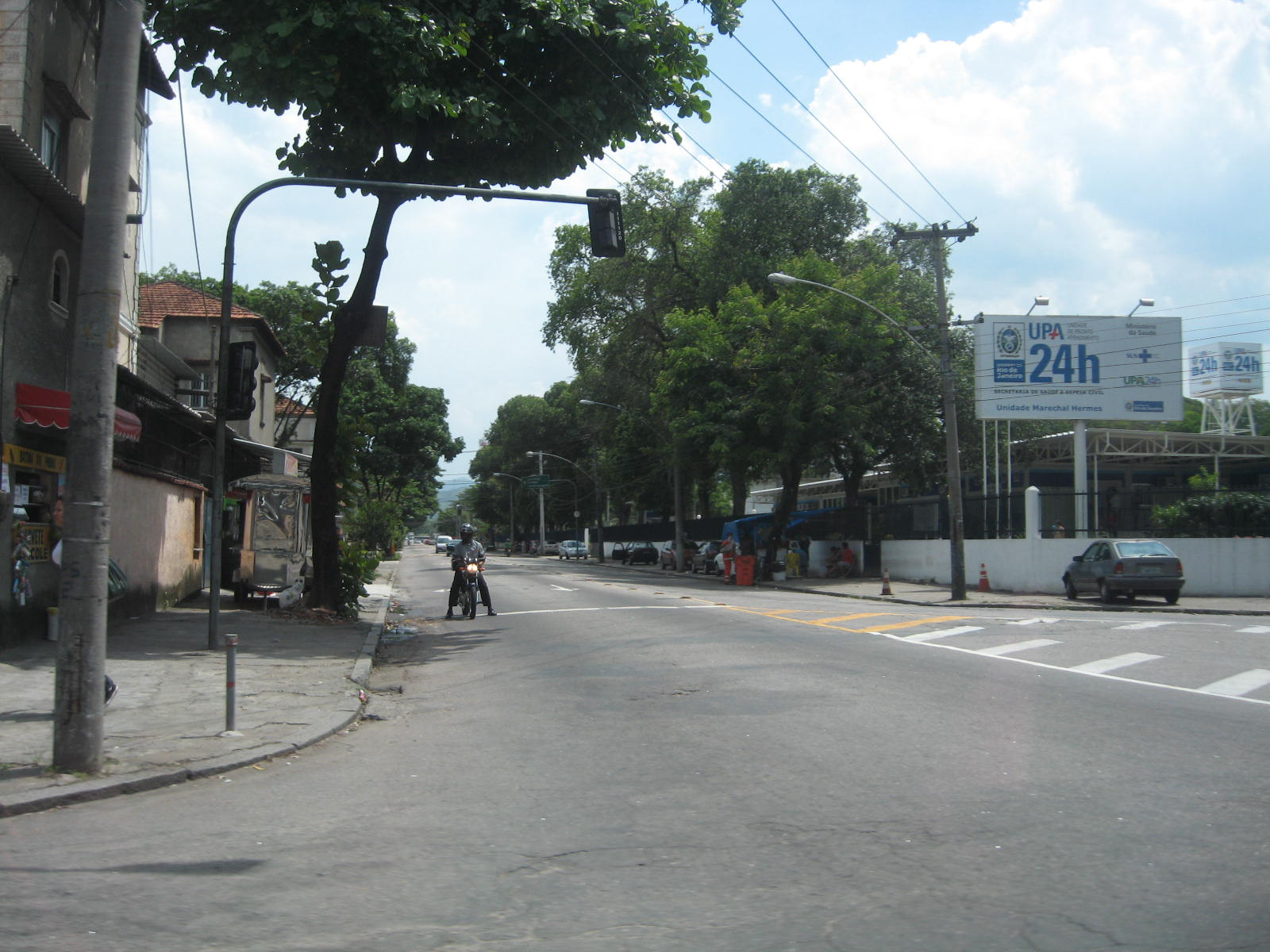
A street in Marechal Hermes
