= Rocha Miranda =

- Neighborhood
- Location in Rio de Janeiro Rocha Miranda (Brazil)
- Coordinates: 22°50′54″S 43°20′47″W
- Country: Brazil
- State: Rio de Janeiro (RJ)
- Municipality/City: Rio de Janeiro
- Zone: North Zone

Rocha Miranda is a neighborhood in the North Zone of Rio de Janeiro, Brazil.
