= Black activism =

Black activism may refer to:

== General frameworks ==
- Critical race theory, intellectual movement and framework
- Ethnic nationalism, a form of nationalism wherein the nation and nationality are defined in terms of ethnicity
- Identity politics, politics based on a particular identity including ethnicity and race
- Pan-Africanism, a worldwide movement that aims to encourage and strengthen bonds of solidarity between all indigenous peoples and diasporas of African ancestry
- Racial nationalism, an ideology that advocates a racial definition of national identity
- Black supremacy, a racial supremacist belief which maintains that black people are inherently superior to people of other races

== Africa ==
- African nationalism, a group of political ideologies in West, Central, East and Southern Africa based on the idea of national self-determination and the creation of nation states
- Afrocentrism, a worldview centered on the history of people of African descent or a biased view that favors it over non-African civilizations
- Black Consciousness Movement, South African anti-apartheid movement in 1960s
- Black genocide in the United States, the notion that African Americans have been subjected to genocide because of racism against African Americans
- Black Judaism, Judaism that is practiced by people of African descent, both within Africa and the African diaspora, as well as within the Jewish diaspora
- Black-Palestinian solidarity, political solidarity between Palestinian people and Black people
- Hoteps, groups of African Americans who believe that they are the descendants of the Ancient Egyptians
- Négritude, cultural and political movement developed by a francophone African elite

== United States ==
- Black church, the faith and body of Christian denominations and congregations in the United States that predominantly minister to, and are also led by African Americans
- Black Hebrew Israelites, groups of African Americans who believe that they are the descendants of the ancient Israelites
- Black is beautiful, a cultural movement started in the 1960s
- Black Lives Matter, a political and social movement promote anti-racism
- Black power movement, a branch within the civil rights movement started in the 1960s
- Black separatism, a separatist political movement that seeks separate economic and cultural development for those of African descent in societies
- Political hip hop § Ideology and views of political rappers, a subgenre of hip hop music that was developed in the 1980s as a way of turning hip hop into a form of political activism
- Racism against African Americans, dating back to the colonial era and persisting in the 21st century
- Religion of Black Americans, religious and spiritual practices of African Americans in the US
- Woke, a term meaning alert to racial or social injustices

== See also ==
- Black people
- African diaspora
