= Vila Valqueire =

- Neighborhood
- Location in Rio de Janeiro Vila Valqueire (Brazil)
- Coordinates: 22°53′23″S 43°22′01″W
- Country: Brazil
- State: Rio de Janeiro (RJ)
- Municipality/City: Rio de Janeiro
- Zone: Southwest Zone

Vila Valqueire is a neighborhood in the Southwest Zone of Rio de Janeiro, Brazil. It is situated near the border of the North and Western zones, and has a good quality of life with many squares, green places and services.
