= Line 3 (Rio LRT) =

Rio de Janeiro LRT Line 3
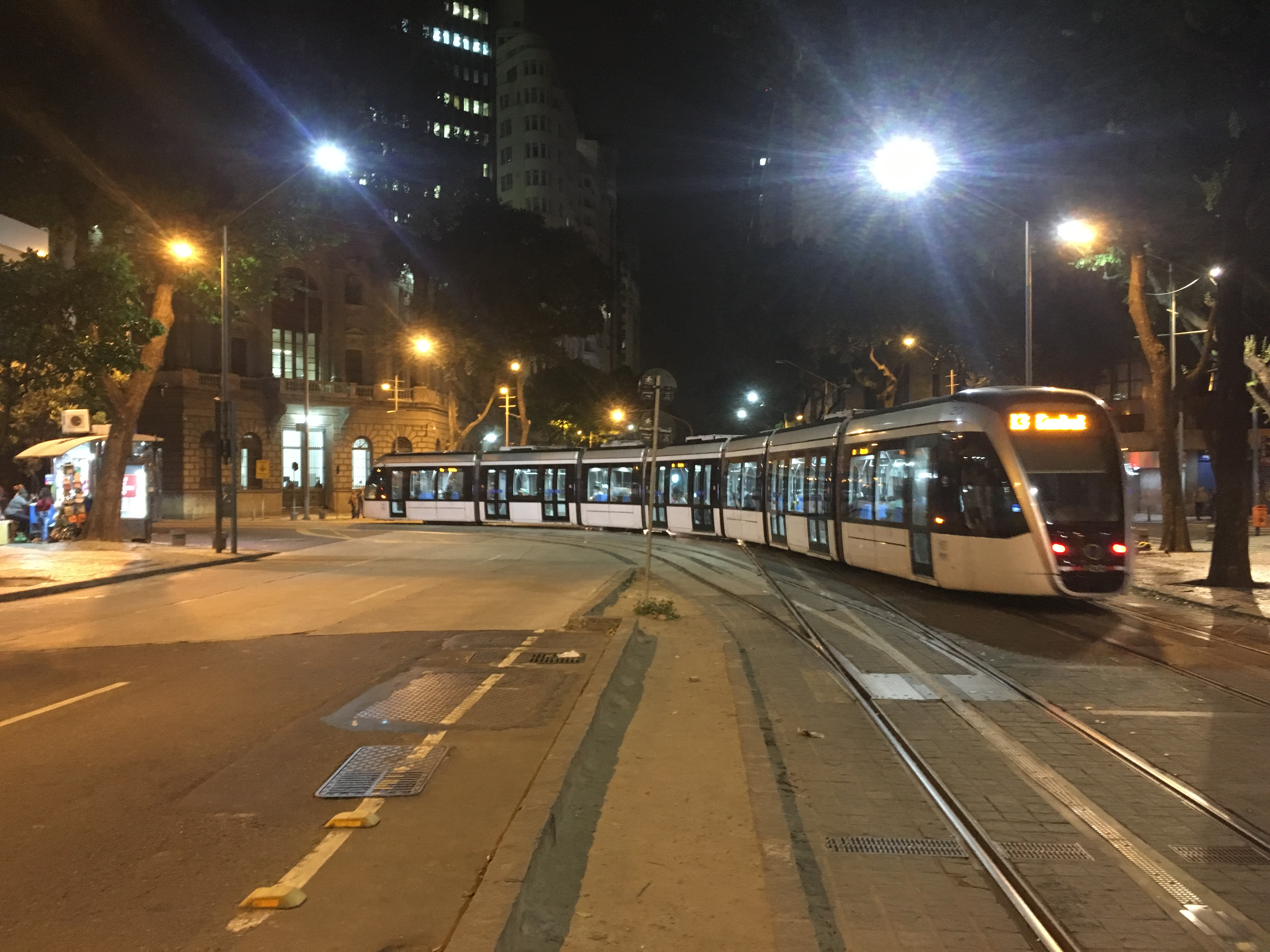
- LRT leaving Line 1 and accessing Line 3

Overview
- Status: Operational
- Owner: Prefecture of Rio de Janeiro
- Locale: Rio de Janeiro, Brazil
- Termini: Central; Santos Dumont
- Stations: 10

Service
- System: Rio de Janeiro Light Rail
- Operator(s): Concessionária do VLT Carioca S.A.

History
- Opened: 26 October 2019

Technical
- Line length: 1.8 km (1.1 mi)
- Character: At-grade
- Track gauge: 1,435 mm (4 ft 8 1/2 in)
- Electrification: Third rail
- Operating speed: 15 km/h (9.3 mph) (average); 50 km/h (31 mph) (maximum)

Line 3: Central ↔ Santos Dumont is an LRT line on VLT Carioca system, in Rio de Janeiro, Brazil.

It has 10 stops, all at-grade. Six of them connect with Line 1 (including terminal station Santos Dumont), 1 with Line 2 (terminal station Central), and 3 more for Line 3: Santa Rita/Pretos Novos, Camerino/Rosas Negras and Cristiano Ottoni/Pequena África.

The name of the stops of the line was changed to pay tribute to African descent movements and historical monuments connected to the African culture along the way, besides having only geographic references. Cristiano Ottoni/Pequena África was named after the square where the station is located and the area in the district of Centro, where are located the main locations for appreciation to the African culture and heritage. Camerino/Rosas Negras was named after Rua Camerino and the women movements against the slavery and in favor of the black people rights in the end of the 19th century and beginning of 20th century. Santa Rita/Pretos Novos was named after the cemetery located in the area, discovered during the line construction.

The line is in tests since November 2018, but problems between Rio's Prefecture and the LRT operating consortium didn't allow the line to enter in operation. It was opened on 26 October 2019.`

== Station ==
=== Central → Santos Dumont ===
#	Name	Opening	District	Connections
1	Central	20 October 2017	Centro	LRT Line 2 MetrôRio Lines 1 and 2 SuperVia Central do Brasil; Col. Américo Fontenelle Road Terminal; Providência Gondola Lift
2	Cristiano Ottoni/Pequena África	26 October 2019	Centro	−
3	Camerino/Rosas Negras	26 October 2019	Centro	MetrôRio Lines 1 and 2
4	Santa Rita/Pretos Novos	26 October 2019	Centro	−
5	Candelária	5 June 2016	Centro	LRT Line 1
6	Sete de Setembro	5 June 2016	Centro	LRT Lines 1 and 2
7	Carioca	5 June 2016	Centro	LRT Line 1 MetrôRio Lines 1 and 2
8	Cinelândia	5 June 2016	Centro	LRT Line 1 MetrôRio Lines and 2
9	Antônio Carlos	5 June 2016	Centro	LRT Line 1
10	Santos Dumont	5 June 2016	Centro	LRT Line 1 Santos Dumont Airport

=== Santos Dumont → Central ===
#	Name	Opening	District	Connections
1	Santos Dumont	5 June 2016	Centro	LRT Line 1 Santos Dumont Airport
2	Antônio Carlos	5 June 2016	Centro	LRT Line 1
3	Cinelândia	5 June 2016	Centro	LRT Line 1 MetrôRio Lines 1 and 2
4	Carioca	5 June 2016	Centro	LRT Line 1 MetrôRio Lines 1 and 2
5	Sete de Setembro	5 June 2016	Centro	LRT Lines 1 and 2
6	Candelária	5 June 2016	Centro	LRT Line 1
7	Santa Rita/Pretos Novos	26 October 2019	Centro	−
8	Camerino/Rosas Negras	26 October 2019	Centro	MetrôRio Lines 1 and 2
9	Cristiano Ottoni/Pequena África	26 October 2019	Centro	−
10	Central	20 October 2017	Centro	LRT Line 2 MetrôRio Lines 1 and 2 SuperVia Central do Brasil; Col. Américo Fontenelle Road Terminal; Providência Gondola Lift
