= Line 2 (Rio LRT) =

Rio de Janeiro LRT Line 2
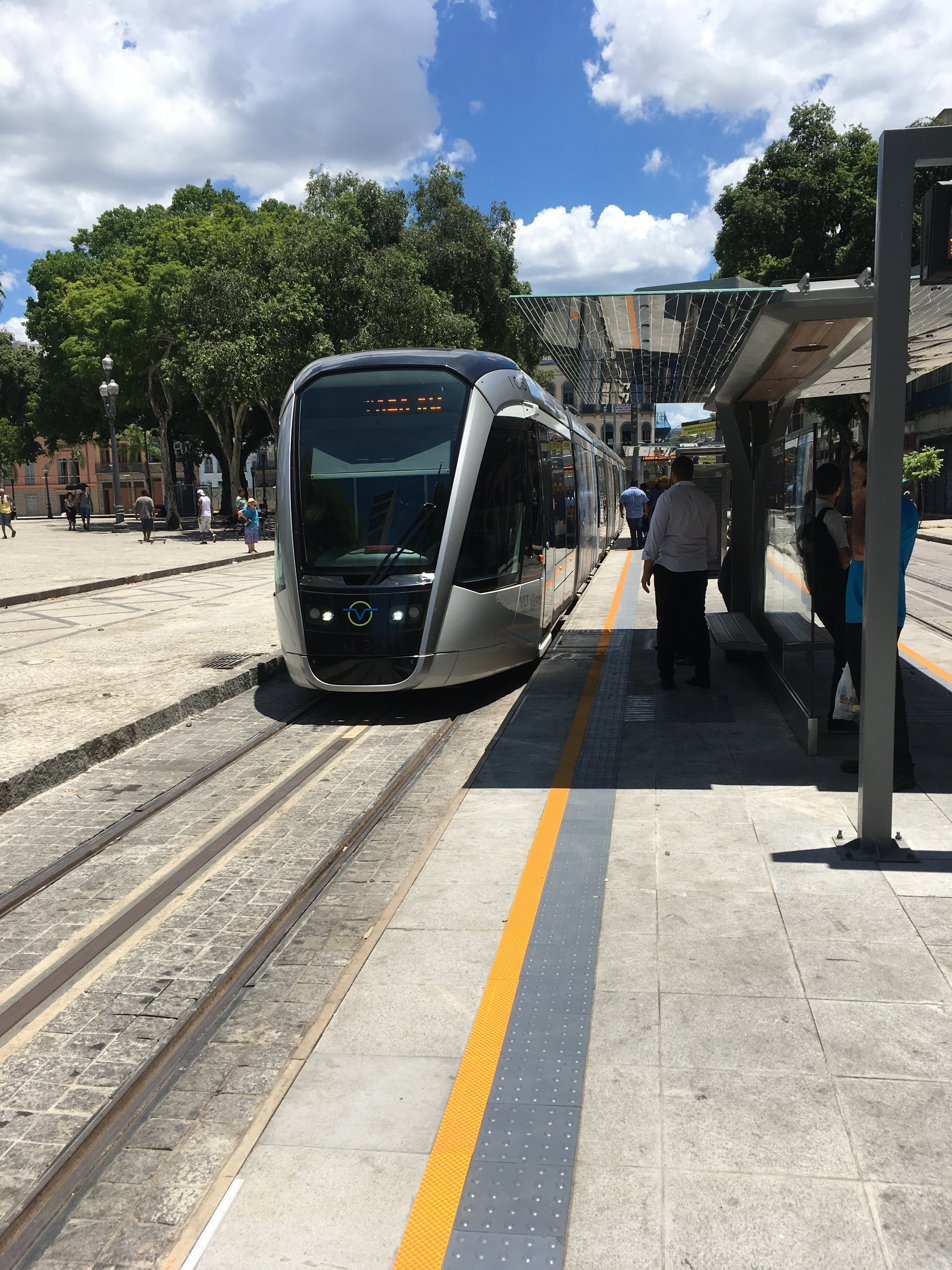
- LRT composition in operation, in Tiradentes stop.

Overview
- Status: Operational
- Owner: Prefecture of Rio de Janeiro
- Locale: Rio de Janeiro, Brazil
- Termini: Praia Formosa; Praça XV
- Stations: 11 operational

Service
- Type: Light rail transit
- System: Rio de Janeiro Light Rail
- Operator(s): Concessionária do VLT Carioca S.A.

History
- Opened: 6 February 2017

Technical
- Line length: 1.8 kilometres (1.1 mi)
- Character: At-grade
- Track gauge: 1,435 mm (4 ft 8 1/2 in)
- Electrification: Alstom APS
- Operating speed: 15 km/h (9.3 mph) (average); 50 km/h (31 mph) (maximum)

Line 2: Praia Formosa ↔ Praça XV is one of the lines of VLT Carioca, in Rio de Janeiro, Brazil, that opened on 6 February 2017.

It has 10 stops in operation, all at-grade. Besides that, another one is in planning. Stops Praia Formosa, Rodoviária, Central and Praça XV have connection with other transport modals.

The system, operated by Concessionária do VLT Carioca S.A., still don't have the balance of the passengers' movement since the beginning of the operation. It attends the districts of Centro and Santo Cristo.

== Stations ==
=== Praia Formosa → Praça XV ===
#	Name	Opening	District	Connections
1	Praia Formosa	3 December 2017	Santo Cristo	—N/a
2	Rodoviária	12 July 2016	Santo Cristo	LRT Lines 1 and 4 Rio de Janeiro Road Terminal
3	Equador	12 July 2016	Santo Cristo	LRT Lines 1 and 4
4	Pereira Reis	12 July 2016	Santo Cristo	LRT Lines 1 and 4
5	Vila Olímpica	21 October 2017	Santo Cristo	LRT Line 4
6	Central	21 October 2017	Centro	LRT Lines 3 and 4 MetrôRio Lines 1 and 2 SuperVia Central do Brasil; Col. Américo Fontenelle Road Terminal; Providência Gondola Lift
7	Cristiano Ottoni/Pequena África	26 October 2019	Centro	LRT Lines 3 and 4
8	Saara	6 February 2017	Centro	LRT Line 4
9	Tiradentes	6 February 2017	Centro	LRT Line 4
10	Colombo	6 February 2017	Centro	LRT Lines 1, 3 and 4
11	Praça XV	6 February 2017	Centro	LRT Line 4 CCR Barcas Ferry Station

=== Praça XV → Praia Formosa ===
#	Name	Opening	District	Connections
1	Praça XV	6 February 2017	Centro	LRT Line 4 CCR Barcas Ferry Station
2	Colombo	6 February 2017	Centro	LRT Lines 1, 3 and 4
3	Tiradentes	6 February 2017	Centro	LRT Line 4
4	Saara	6 February 2017	Centro	LRT Line 4
5	Cristiano Ottoni/Pequena África	26 October 2019	Centro	LRT Lines 3 and 4
6	Central	21 October 2017	Centro	LRT Lines 3 and 4 MetrôRio Lines 1 and 2 SuperVia Central do Brasil; Col. Américo Fontenelle Road Terminal; Providência Gondola Lift
7	Gamboa	21 October 2017	Santo Cristo	LRT Lines 1 and 4
8	Santo Cristo	21 October 2017	Santo Cristo	LRT Lines 1 and 4
9	Cordeiro da Graça	21 October 2017	Santo Cristo	LRT Lines 1 and 4
10	Rodoviária	12 July 2016	Santo Cristo	LRT Lines 1 and 4 Rio de Janeiro Road Terminal
11	Praia Formosa	3 December 2017	Santo Cristo	—N/a
