= Sampaio station =

Metro station in Rio de Janeiro, Brazil

Sampaio Estação Sampaio
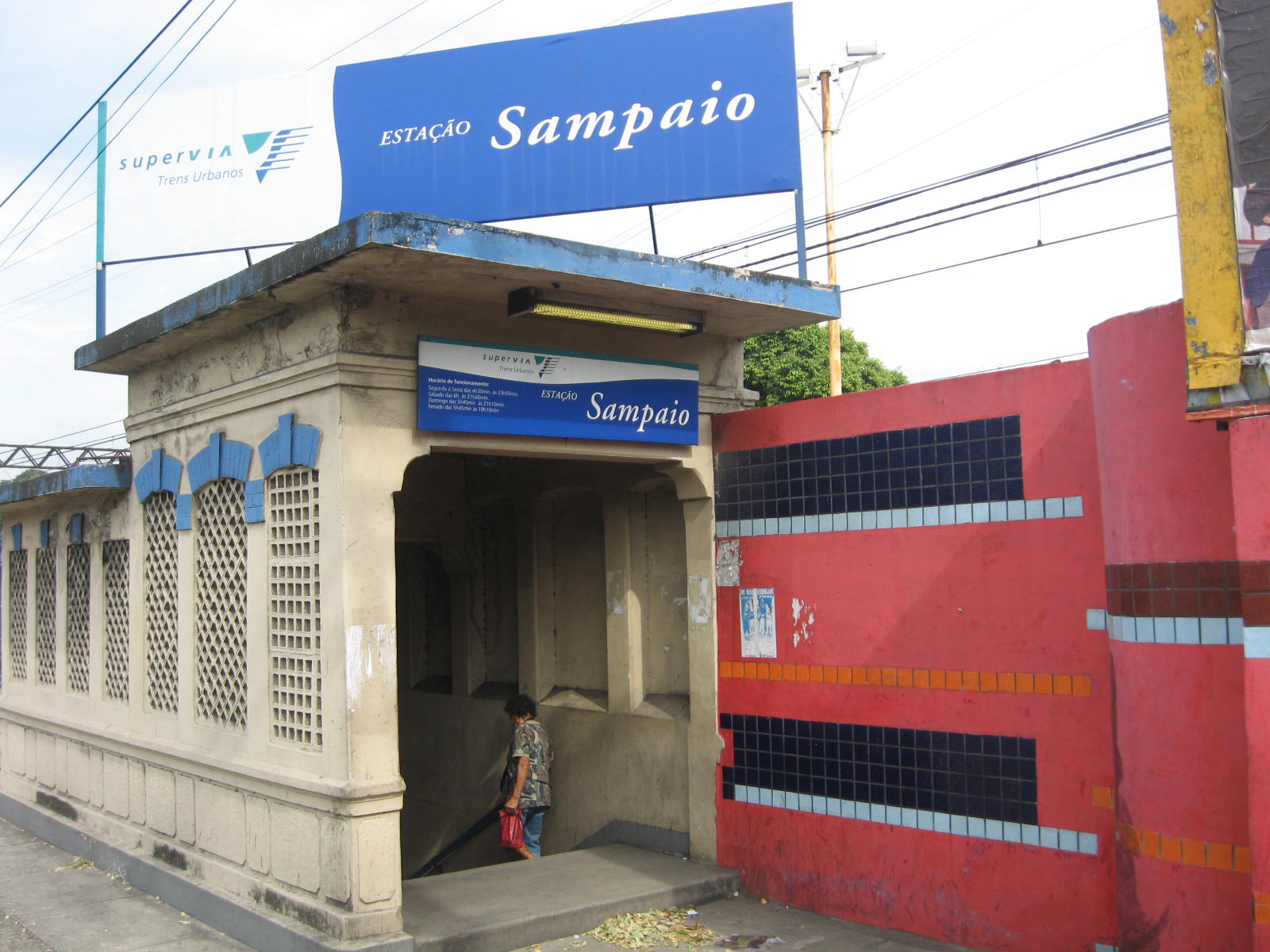
- Sampaio station in 2011

General information
- Location: Rio de Janeiro; Brazil
- Coordinates: 22.9019444°S 43.2621667°W
- Owner: Rio de Janeiro State Government
- Operator: SuperVia
- Line: Deodoro Line
- Platforms: 1 island platform
- Tracks: 2

Other information
- Station code: SPO

History
- Opened: 1885
- Electrified: 1937

Services
| Preceding station | SuperVia | Following station |
|---|---|---|
| Riachuelo towards Central | Deodoro | Engenho Novo towards Deodoro |
Location
- Location within Rio de Janeiro

Sampaio is a railway station in Sampaio, Rio de Janeiro which is serviced by the Supervia.

== History ==
Sampaio Station was opened in 1885, being part of the first section of the Central do Brasil Railroad, between Rio de Janeiro and Nova Iguaçu. With the growth of the city of Rio de Janeiro - In large part caused by the existence of the train line - passenger trains started to run with ever increasing frequency, and the line would be electrified in 1937. The station was never modernized, and therefore still has features dating to the original construction.

== Notable places nearby ==
- Celso Lisboa University Centre (pt)

== Platforms ==
Platform 1A: Towards Deodoro (Stopper)
Platform 1B: Towards Central do Brasil (Stopper)
