= Praça da Bandeira station =

Metro station in Rio de Janeiro, Brazil

Praça da Bandeira Estação Praça da Bandeira
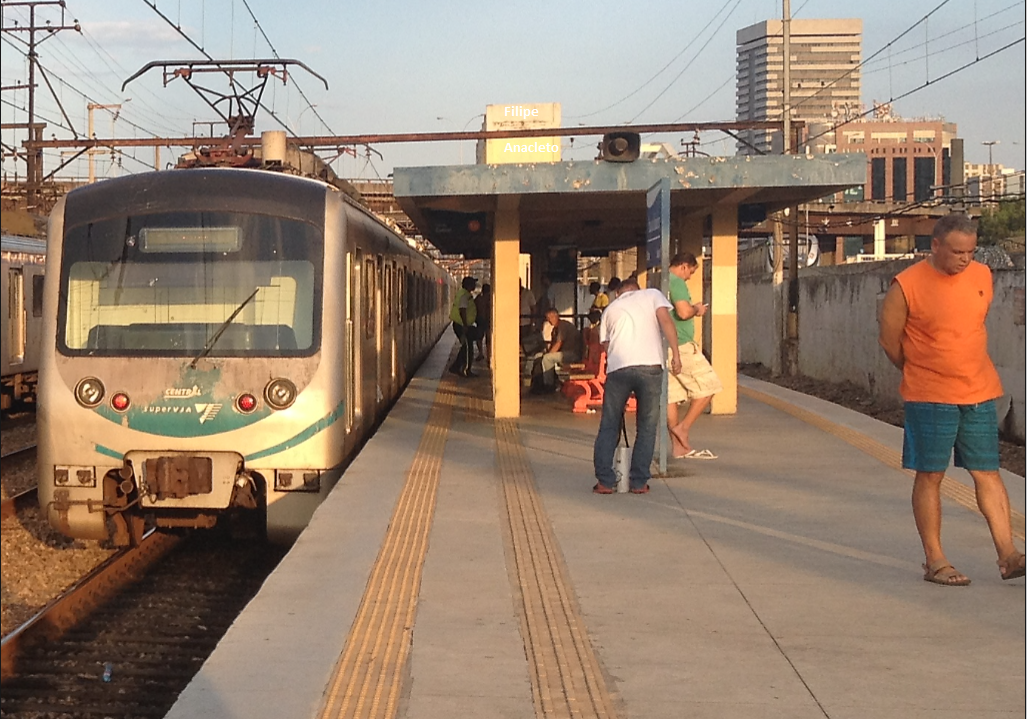
- Praça da Bandeira station in 2016

General information
- Location: Rio de Janeiro; Brazil
- Coordinates: 22.9098528°S 43.2129222°W
- Elevation: 8 m (26 ft)
- Owner: Rio de Janeiro State Government
- Operator: SuperVia
- Line: Deodoro Line
- Platforms: 1 island platform
- Tracks: 2

Other information
- Station code: RJ-1301

History
- Opened: 1907; 119 years ago
- Electrified: 1937; 89 years ago
- Former names: Lauro Müller

Services
Preceding station	SuperVia	Following station
Central Terminus	Deodoro	São Cristóvão towards Deodoro
Central Terminus	Santa Cruz	São Cristóvão towards Santa Cruz
Central Terminus	Japeri	São Cristóvão towards Japeri
Location
- Location within Rio de Janeiro

Praça da Bandeira Station (Portuguese: Estação Praça da Bandeira), previously known as Lauro Müller Station (Portuguese: Estação Lauro Müller), is a railway station in Praça da Bandeira, Rio de Janeiro which is serviced by the Supervia.

== History ==
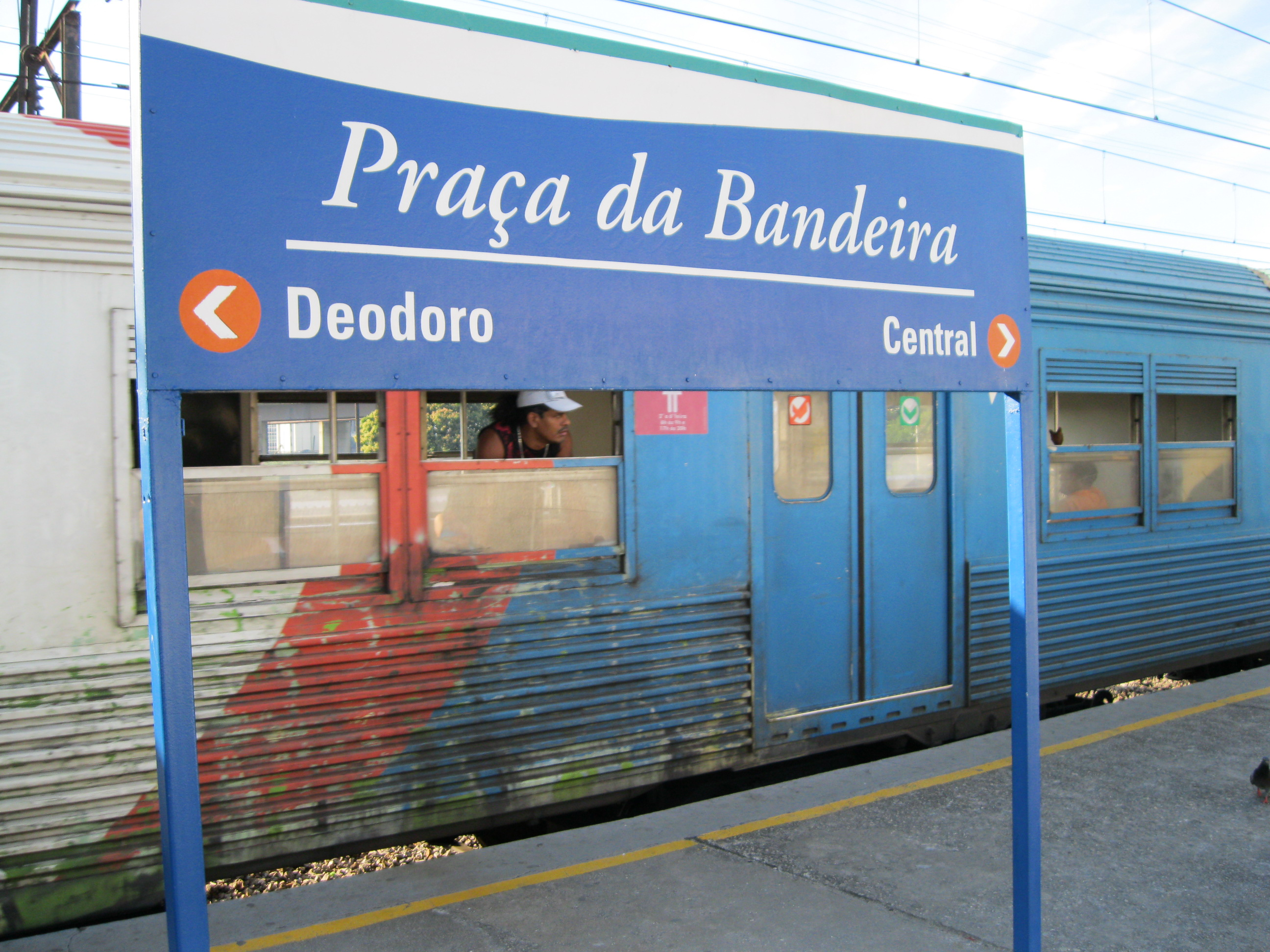
Praça da Bandeira Station

The station, then known as Lauro Müller Station, was inaugurated in 1907, following a modification of the trackbed of the Central do Brasil Railroad between Central do Brasil (then known as Dom Pedro II) and São Cristóvão. In 1957, Manchete magazine described the construction of the station as follows: "(…) With [passenger] traffic increasing day by day, especially after the start of the railway services from the docks, and to avoid future complications with the lateral avenues of the new Mangue Canal, opened by the Comissão Construtora do Cais do Porto (Docklands Construction Commission), the director Francisco de Paiva Ramos, on 25th May 1903, suggested elevating the line between São Cristóvão and São Diogo, removing the level crossing on the Praia Formosa, Figueira de Melo and São Cristóvão Roads. The idea was approved, and the project was executed by the Seção Técnica da Linha (Technical Section of the Line), under the leadership of the engineer Carlos Euler, helped by his colleague Mário Martins Costa. The line elevation works, which included the construction of a metallic viaduct over the canal, near Leopoldina Station, started in 1905, with José de Andrade Pinto being the chief line engineer. With the elevation of the line, São Diogo lost its importance, and Lauro Muller Station opened. It was named after the transport minister at the time, who inaugurated the station alongside Afonso Pena, the President of the Republic". The station was renamed in the 2000s after the public square on which it's located.

== Platforms ==
Southbound local	← Deodoro Line toward Central do Brasil (Central do Brasil) (weekday mornings and early afternoons) ← Santa Cruz Line toward Central do Brasil (Central do Brasil) (weekends and weekday afternoons and evenings) ← Japeri Line toward Central do Brasil (Central do Brasil) (weekends and weekday afternoons and evenings)
Island platform
Northbound local	Deodoro Line toward Deodoro (São Cristóvão) (weekdays, except nights) → Santa Cruz Line toward Santa Cruz (São Cristóvão) (weekends and weekday early mornings and nights) → Japeri Line toward Japeri (São Cristóvão) (weekends and weekday early mornings and late nights) →
Southbound express	← Santa Cruz Line does not stop here (weekday mornings and early afternoons) ← Japeri Line does not stop here (weekday mornings and early afternoons)
Northbound express	Santa Cruz Line does not stop here (weekdays, except early mornings and nights) → Japeri Line does not stop here (weekdays, except mornings and late nights) →
Southbound	← Belford Roxo Line does not stop here ← Saracuruna Line does not stop here
Northbound	Belford Roxo Line does not stop here → Saracuruna Line does not stop here →
