= Line 1 (Rio LRT) =

Line of Rio de Janeiro light rail

Rio de Janeiro LRT Line 1
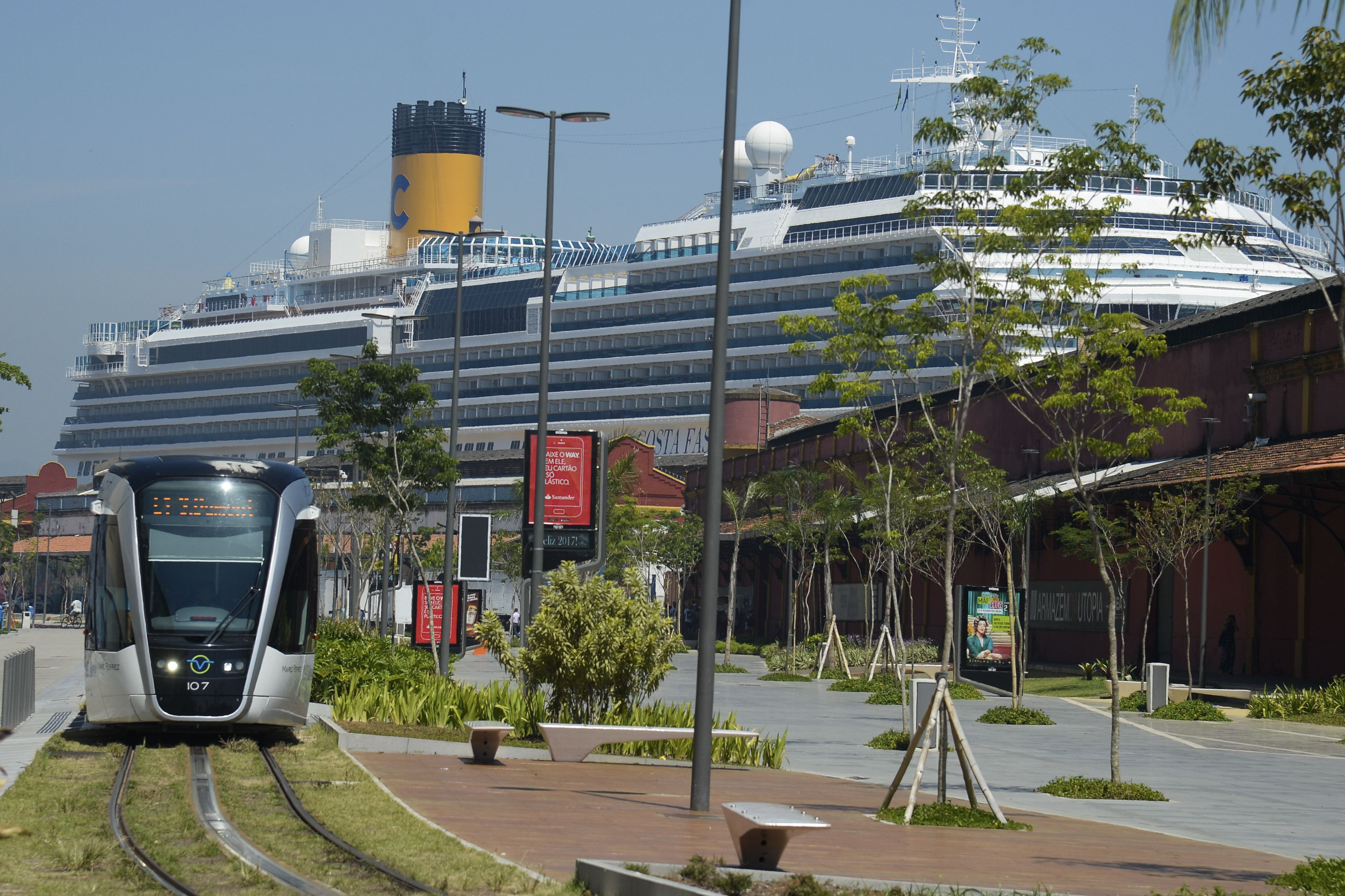
- LRT composition in operation, in Orla Conde.

Overview
- Status: Operational
- Owner: Prefecture of Rio de Janeiro
- Locale: Rio de Janeiro, Brazil
- Termini: Terminal Intermodal Gentileza; Santos Dumont
- Stations: 20 operational

Service
- Type: Light rail transit
- System: Rio de Janeiro Light Rail
- Operator(s): Concessionária do VLT Carioca S.A.

History
- Opened: 5 June 2016

Technical
- Line length: 12 kilometres (7.5 mi)
- Character: At-grade
- Track gauge: 1,435 mm (4 ft 8 1/2 in)
- Electrification: Alstom APS
- Operating speed: 15 km/h (9.3 mph) (average); 50 km/h (31 mph) (maximum)

Line 1: Terminal Intermodal Gentileza ↔ Santos Dumont is one of the lines operated by VLT Carioca in Rio de Janeiro, Brazil. It became operational on 5 June 2016.

It has a total of 16 stops in operation, all at-grade. Besides that, another one is in planning. The stops Praia Formosa, Rodoviária, Providência, Parada dos Navios/Valongo, Carioca, Cinelândia and Santos Dumont has connection with other transport modals.

The system, operated by Concessionária do VLT Carioca S.A., registered a movement of more than 6 million passengers in the first 10 months of operation. Attends the following districts: Centro, Gamboa, Santo Cristo and Saúde.

== History ==
=== Main events ===
- 5 June 2016: Start of assisted operation, between Santos Dumont and Parada dos Museus, Mon-Fri 12p.m.-3p.m., with intervals of 20 minutes between trains and no fee.
- June 2016:
  - Ampliation of the working hours: 10a.m.-5p.m.
  - Ampliation of the working hours: 8a.m.-5p.m.
- 9 July 2016: Start of the operation during weekends.
- 12 July 2016: Start of the operation of branch between Parada dos Museus and Rodoviária.
- 26 July 2016: Start of the commercial operation.
- 3 August 2016: Olympic flame is transported through LRT, from Santos Dumont to Cinelândia.
- 4 June 2017: Start of the operation of the second track of Line 1 between Gamboa and Parada dos Navios.

=== Interruptions ===
In the first business day of the LRT, on 6 June 2016, an electrical failure interrupted the operation of the service after one of the trains left Antônio Carlos, at 3p.m. (BRT). The activity of the composition was normalized after 20 minutes.

On 8 June 2016, a failure in the energy supply system interrupted the service between stops Sete de Setembro and São Bento. On 23 July, a security device was triggered by some object on the tracks and interrupted the operation in Avenida Rio Branco, next to Avenida Presidente Antônio Carlos and the service was dead for almost 3 hours.

On 31 August 2016, after the automatic shutdown of two Furnas transmission lines, the LRT operation was interrupted for an hour, between 3p.m. and 4p.m. (BRT).

On 25 January 2917, the traffic was interrupted for almost an hour after an accident with an elder woman, who fell next to the Avenida Central building, crossing Avenida Rio Branco. She didn't notice that there were two steps in the central flower bed, stumbled and fell with her face to the ground.

== Stations ==
=== Terminal Intermodal Gentileza → Santos Dumont ===
#	Name	Opening	District	Connections
1	Terminal Intermodal Gentileza	23 February 2024	São Cristóvão	LRT Line 4
2	Rodoviária	12 July 2016	Santo Cristo	Rio de Janeiro Road Terminal; LRT Lines 2 and 4
3	Equador	12 July 2016	Santo Cristo	Lines 2 and 4
4	Pereira Reis	12 July 2016	Santo Cristo	Lines 2 and 4
5	Gamboa	2016	Santo Cristo	Lines 2 and 4
6	Providência	4 June 2017	Gamboa	Providência Gondola Lift
7	Harmonia	4 June 2017	Gamboa	—N/a
8	Parada dos Navios/Valongo	13 June 2016	Gamboa	Píer Mauá International Ferry Terminal
9	Parada dos Museus	5 June 2016	Saúde	—N/a
10	São Bento	5 June 2016	Centro	—N/a
11	Candelária	5 June 2016	Centro	LRT Line 3
12	Sete de Setembro	5 June 2016	Centro	LRT Line 3
13	Carioca	5 June 2016	Centro	LRT Line 3 MetrôRio Lines 1 and 2
14	Cinelândia	5 June 2016	Centro	LRT Line 3 MetrôRio Lines 1 and 2
15	Antônio Carlos/MAM	5 June 2016	Centro	LRT Line 3
16	Santos Dumont	5 June 2016	Centro	LRT Line 3 Santos Dumont Airport

=== Santos Dumont → Terminal Intermodal Gentileza ===
#	Name	Opening	District	Connections
1	Santos Dumont	5 June 2016	Centro	LRT Line 3 Santos Dumont Airport
2	Antônio Carlos/MAM	5 June 2016	Centro	LRT Line 3
3	Cinelândia	5 June 2016	Centro	LRT Line 3 MetrôRio Lines 1 and 2
4	Carioca	5 June 2016	Centro	LRT Line 3 MetrôRio Lines 1 and 2
5	Sete de Setembro	5 June 2016	Centro	LRT Line 3
6	Candelária	5 June 2016	Centro	LRT Line 3
7	São Bento	5 June 2016	Centro	—N/a
8	Parada dos Museus	5 June 2016	Saúde	—N/a
9	Parada dos Navios/Valongo	13 June 2016	Gamboa	Píer Mauá International Ferry Terminal
10	Utopia/AquaRio	12 July 2016	Gamboa	—N/a
11	Cidade do Samba/Tia Ciata	12 July 2016	Santo Cristo	—N/a
12	Santo Cristo	12 July 2016	Santo Cristo	LRT Lines 2 and 4
13	Cordeiro da Graça	21 October 2017	Santo Cristo	LRT Lines 2 and 4
14	Rodoviária	12 July 2016	Santo Cristo	Rio de Janeiro Road Terminal; LRT Lines 2 and 4
15	Terminal Intermodal Gentileza	23 February 2024	São Cristóvão	LRT Line 4
