= Nascimento =

Nascimento may refer to:

- Nascimento (surname), a Portuguese surname
- Nascimento (album), an album by Milton Nascimento
- Nascimento (footballer, born 1937), retired football goalkeeper
- Nascimento (footballer, born 1960), retired football midfielder
