= Nascimento (surname) =

Nascimento (European Portuguese: [nɐʃiˈmẽtu], Brazilian Portuguese: [nasiˈmẽtu]; meaning 'birth') is a common Portuguese surname that refers to the birth of Jesus Christ.

== Statistics ==
In 2004, about 0.39% of the Portuguese population bore the surname Nascimento.

According to Forebears.io, Nascimento is the 571st most common surname in the world and is most prevalent in Brazil.

== Notable people with this surname ==
- Abdias do Nascimento (1914–2011), an Afro-Brazilian scholar, artist, and politician
- Alexandra do Nascimento (born 1981), a Brazilian handball player
- Alexandre do Nascimento (1925–2024), Roman Catholic cardinal and archbishop in Angola
- Allan Nascimento (1991–2026), Brazilian mixed martial artist
- Andrêsa do Nascimento (1859–1927), also known as Preta Fernanda
- Christopher "Kit" Nascimento (born 1932), Guyanese politician and journalist
- Débora Nascimento (born 1985), Brazilian actress and model
- Eduardo Nascimento (1943–2019), Angolan singer
- Emanuel Nascimento (born 1970), a Brazilian freestyle swimmer
- Fabíula Nascimento (born 1978), a Brazilian actress
- Francisco José do Nascimento (1839–1914), Afro-Brazilian abolitionist
- Francisco Manoel de Nascimento (1734–1819), the Portuguese poet known as Filinto Elysio
- Gilberto Nascimento (born 1956), Brazilian politician
- José Eudes Campos do Nascimento (born 1966), a Brazilian Roman Catholic bishop
- Lopo do Nascimento (born 1942), an Angolan politician
- Luiz Gonzaga do Nascimento (1912–1989), a Brazilian singer, songwriter, musician and poet
- Milton Nascimento (born 1942), a Brazilian singer-songwriter
- Norton Nascimento (1962–2007), a Brazilian actor
- Rodrigo Nascimento (born 1992), a Brazilian mixed martial artist
- Yazaldes Nascimento (born 1986), a Portuguese athlete
- Sandro Barbosa do Nascimento (1978–2000), a notorious Brazilian criminal
- Tuany Nascimento (20th and 21st century), Brazilian ballet dancer and dance teacher
- Tasha Nascimento and Tracie Nascimento (born 1995), Brazilian rapper duo

=== Brazilian footballers ===
- Aldair Santos do Nascimento (born 1965), the former Brazilian football defender
- André Luiz Silva do Nascimento (born 1980), the Brazilian footballer
- André Francisco do Nascimento (1982–2010), Brazilian footballer
- Evandro Silva do Nascimento (born 1987), the Brazilian footballer
- Fábio do Nascimento Silva (born 1983), Brazilian footballer
- Gabriel dos Santos Nascimento (born 1983), Brazilian footballer
- Gi Santos - Giovanna dos Santos Nascimento (born 1997), Brazilian women's football player
- Jackson Nascimento (1924–2026), Brazilian footballer
- Jeovânio Rocha do Nascimento (born 1977), Brazilian defensive midfielder
- Robert Kenedy Nunes Nascimento (born 1996), the Brazilian footballer
- Leonardo Nascimento de Araújo (born 1969), Brazilian footballer
- Luizão — Luiz Carlos Nascimento Júnior (born 1987), Brazilian footballer
- Matheus Leite Nascimento (born 1983), the Brazilian footballer
- Moacir Barbosa Nascimento (1921–2000), the former Brazilian football goalkeeper
- Nasa - Marcos Antonio García Nascimento (born 1979), Brazilian footballer
- Paulo Sérgio Silvestre do Nascimento (born 1969), the former Brazilian footballer
- Pelé — Edson Arantes do Nascimento (1940–2022), the Brazilian footballer
  - Edinho — Edson Cholbi Nascimento (born 1970), the former Brazilian football goalkeeper and son of Pelé
- Rafael da Silva Nascimento (born 1984), Brazilian footballer
- Ramires Santos do Nascimento (born 1987), the Brazilian footballer
- Serginho — Sérgio Paulo Nascimento Filho (born 1988), the Brazilian footballer
- Tinga — Paulo César Fonseca do Nascimento (born 1978), the Brazilian footballer
