= Complexo - Universo Paralelo =

- Directed by: Mário Patrocínio
- Release date: January 13, 2011 (Portugal)
- Running time: 80 minutes
- Country: Portugal
- Language: Portuguese
- Box office: €85,367.04

Complexo - Universo Paralelo is a 2011 Portuguese documentary film about life in one of the most dangerous favelas in Rio de Janeiro, Complexo do Alemão, directed by Mário Patrocínio.

== Reception ==
It's the third highest-grossing Portuguese documentary film at the Portuguese box office since 2004, with a total box office gross of €85,367.04 and also the third with the highest number of admissions, with 17,042.

In Público's Ípsilon, Jorge Mourinha gave the film a rating of "mediocre".
