= Complexo do Alemão =

Neighborhood of Rio de Janeiro, Brazil

- Neighborhood
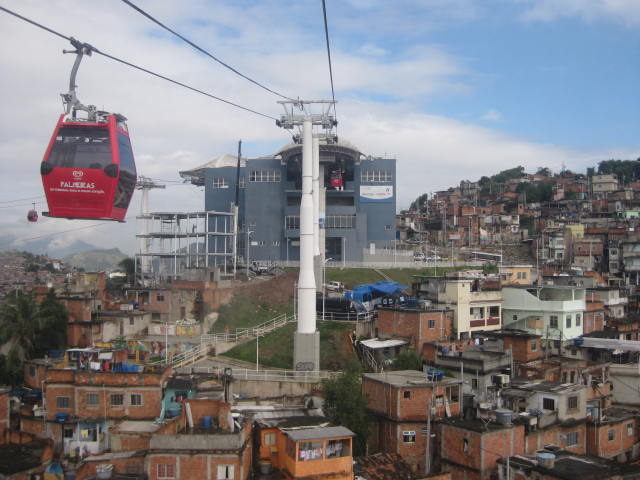
- Gondola lift leaving the Estação da Baiana (Baiana Station) within the Complexo do Alemão; which was used by local residents and tourists prior to its closure.

- Location in Rio de Janeiro
- Coordinates: 22°51′38″S 43°16′25″W
- Country: Brazil
- State: Rio de Janeiro (RJ)
- Municipality/City: Rio de Janeiro
- Zone: North Zone
- Administrative Region: Complexo do Alemão

Area
  - Total: 2.96 km^{2} (1.14 sq mi)

Population (2010)
  - Total: 69,143

Complexo do Alemão (Portuguese: [kõˈplɛksu dwɐleˈmɐ̃w], German's Complex) is a group of favelas (low-income historically informal neighborhoods) in the North Zone of Rio de Janeiro, Brazil.

== History ==
An article published by O Globo in 2007 revealed the origin of Complexo do Alemão. After World War I, a Pole named Leonard Kaczmarkiewicz bought the land. Soon after, the place became known as Morro do Alemão (German's Hill) on account of Kaczmarkiewicz's physical appearance.

The rural area began to change in the late 1920s, when a leather factory, Curtume Carioca, was founded. It attracted hundreds of workers to the region. When Avenida Brasil was inaugurated in 1946, the region started to progress and soon became the city's main industrial zone. Settlement building began in 1951, when Kaczmarkiewicz divided his land into plots and sold them. Similar to other parts of Rio, the area evolved haphazardly and grew into a favela over several decades.

== Demographics ==
- Area: 296.09 ha (2.96 km^{2}) (2003)
- Population: 69,143 (2010)
- Homes: 21,272 (2010)

== Social issues ==
=== 2007 police operation ===
On June 27, 2007, a few days before the Live Earth concert in Copacabana and the opening ceremony of the XV Pan American Games, Complexo do Alemão was the scene of a huge operation led by the Military Police against the gang that controlled the area. Official numbers state that the police killed almost twenty people in the region. Until the end of the Pan-American Games, Complexo do Alemão was under siege. The operation was not without criticism, as some believed its purpose was to suppress the drug dealers of the Complexo do Alemão favelas during the Pan-American Games so Brazil's international image would not be hurt if anything had happened during the Games. The United Nations Children's Fund also criticized the operation, which injured four minors. The area received the sobriquet Gaza Strip due to the frequent outbreaks of violence.

The police operation in the Complexo in June 2007 was partly in response to the killing of two police officers on May 1, 2007 in the Zona Norte neighborhood of Oswaldo Cruz. The policemen were patrolling João Vicente street at the location of a car-jacking involving the dragging-death of child João Hélio had occurred. (The police car was surrounded by armed gang members and sprayed with thirty bullets.)

=== 2010 occupation ===
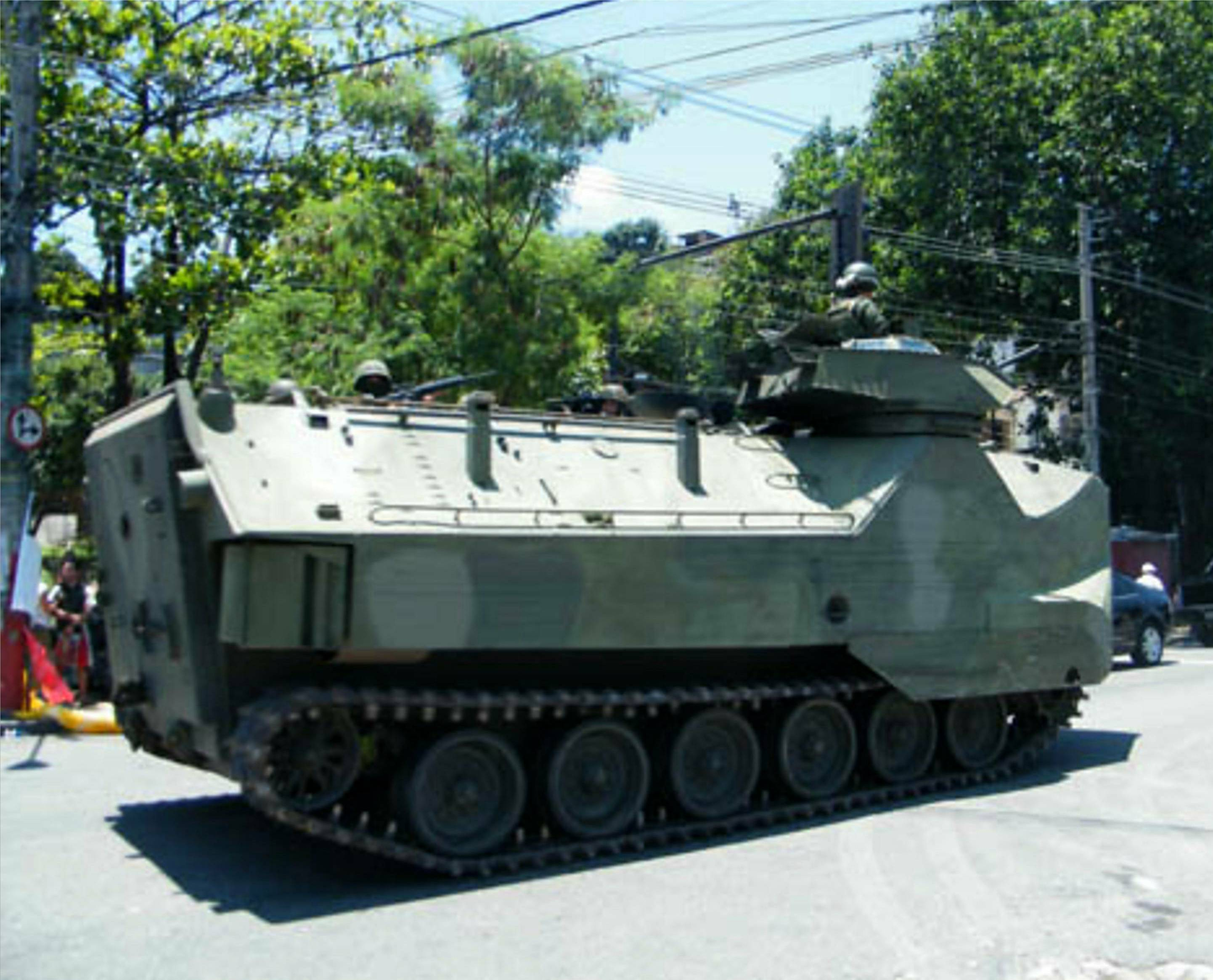
A Brazilian AAV on a street in the Complexo do Alemão, November 2010

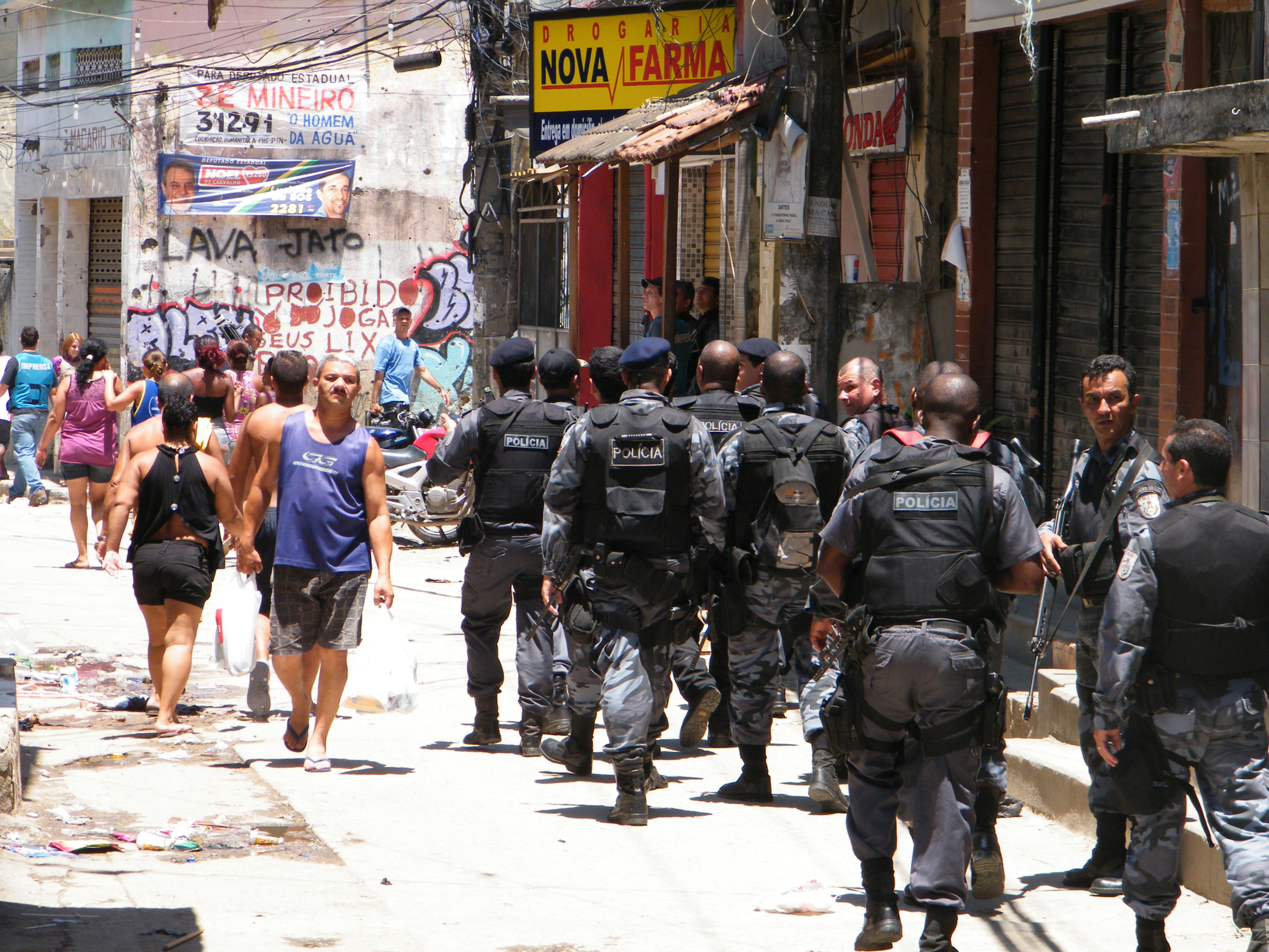
Police entering the Complexo do Alemão during the 2010 Rio de Janeiro Security Crisis

On November 25, 2010, the Special Ops Battalion (BOPE) together with the Brazilian Navy, invaded the Vila Cruzeiro favela, in Rio de Janeiro. The majority of drug traffickers eventually fled to the neighboring Complexo do Alemão.

The operation, which was part of the 2010 Rio de Janeiro Security Crisis, was the State responding to drug traffickers setting buses and other vehicles on fire using combustible fuels. These attacks occurred in various neighborhoods throughout the city of Rio de Janeiro. The coordinated attack was in retaliation for the government setting up UPPs, Unidade de Policia pacificadora, Pacifying Police units within various favelas around Rio. This led to the expulsion of assorted armed drug traffickers, and tightened pressure upon criminal leaders in those favelas which continued outside the control of the State and its laws, such as the Complexo do Alemão.

Rio's Public Security Chief, José Mariano Beltrame, backed by Rio's Governor, sent an ultimatum to the criminals hidden in the Complexo do Alemão, either to surrender and put down their weapons, or face an invasion of the combined forces of the BOPE, the Brazilian Army, and the Brazilian Navy, which could escalate the violence and bring casualties. The criminals refused to surrender and radioed threats to the military. Two days later, 3000 men invaded the Complexo do Alemão with rifles, battle tanks, and armored cars. Despite the criminals' threats, the military force met with little resistance and took over the area within a few hours. After the invasion, an initial search was conducted, and tons of drugs (cocaine and marijuana) were found, as well as weapons, stolen cars, and motorcycles.

During the operation, the majority of the phone calls to the number set up by Rio's government to anonymously report criminal activity (known as "Disque Denúncia") were from residents living within the Complexo. State security forces also noticed during this period that local residents would quietly signal with subtle body gestures to assist police in their hunt for drugs and weapons.

=== 2022 police operation ===
In late-July 2022, several hundred military police participated in a raid against gangs in the favela, resulting in at least 19 deaths and a number of injuries. The operation sparked controversy over police brutality, with some residents of the favela reporting that police arrested people attempting to provide medical aid to the injured. Human Rights Watch called the raid "one of the deadliest in Rio de Janeiro’s history" and stated that there was evidence of "serious human rights violations, including home invasions, beatings, torture, threats, and failure to rescue injured people."

== UPPs ==
In 2012, the military forces left the Complexo and turned it over to civil police forces. Also in 2012, UPPs began to be established in the Complexo, and government services have been extended the previous two years.

There have been biking and running competitions over the hills from Vila Cruzeiro to Complexo do Alemão. One of which, the "Corrida Desafio da Paz" was organized by the NGO AfroReggae in May 2012, and featured the State Security Chief, José Mariano Beltrame as one of the runners who completed the 5 km run.

On July 23, 2012, the first police officer to die in a favela, while under UPP administration, was shot and killed by criminals within the Nova Brasília area of the Complexo do Alemão. At the time of the shooting, the female officer, 30-year-old Fabiana Aparecida de Souza, who had only been on the force a few months, was at a small UPP station within the favela, when the building was shot at by 12 assailants and she was hit in the abdomen by a rifle bullet. Ten minutes before this occurred, eight assailants shot at two officers patrolling the Pedra do Sapo part of the Complexo, but nobody was injured.

The previous week, police were patrolling the area of Fazendinha within the Complexo when they were attacked two different times. In one of the incidents, a grenade was thrown which exploded near their patrol car.

As a result of the attack resulting in the death of the police officer, an additional 500 UPP police officers were assigned to the Complexo, raising the total number to 1,800 officers working within the community.

== Transport ==
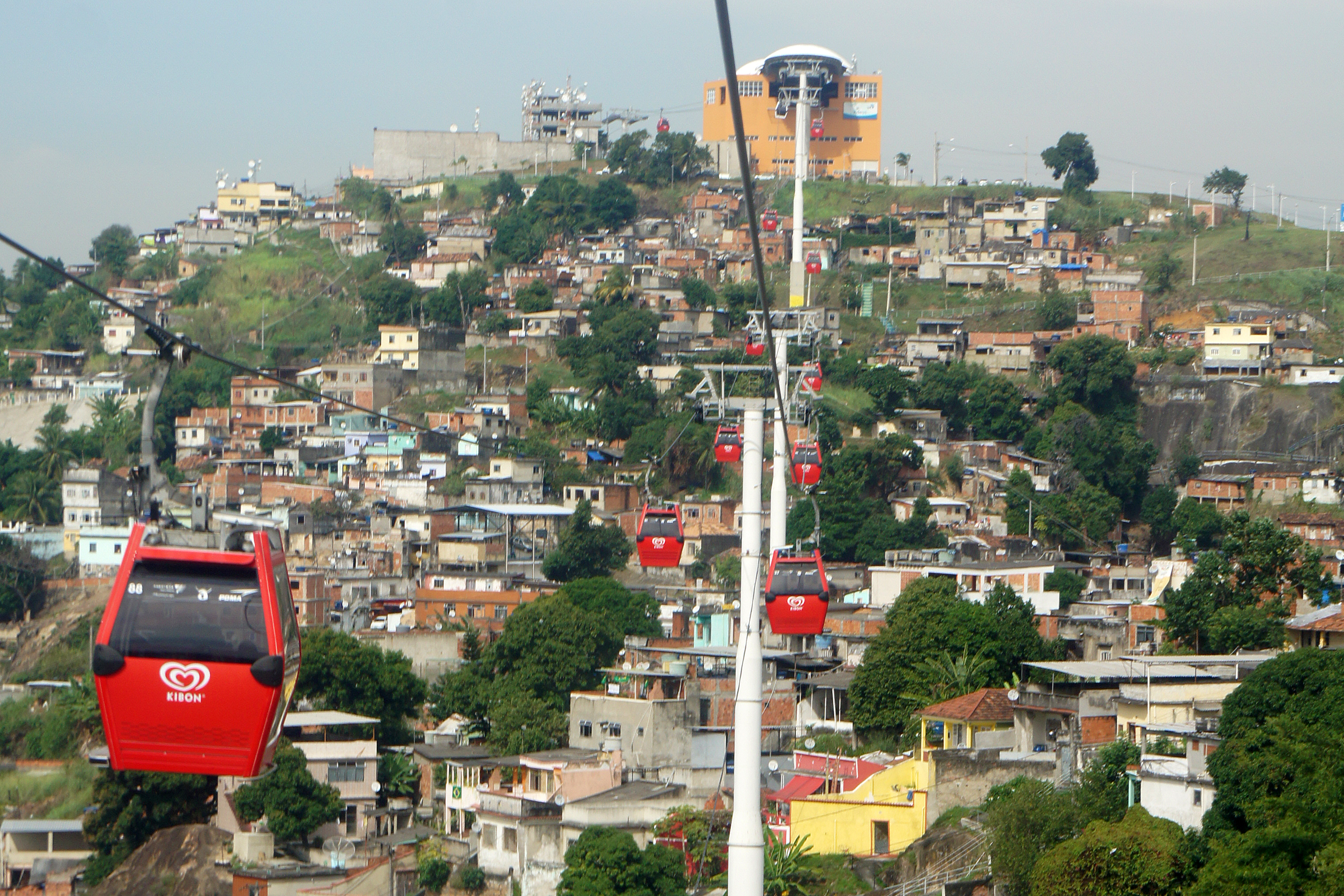
The Teleférico do Alemão was used by both favela commuters to the closer urban train station and tourist alike.

A Gondola lift built by the Leitner-Poma group spanned the Complexo do Alemão allowing residents a faster commute. Services were suspended in 2016 because the state couldn't pay the consortium anymore. It was popularly called "Bondinho do Alemão", in reference to the more famous Sugarloaf Mountain's cableway and Santa Teresa Tramway, both also called bondinho. It was a popular destination for foreign tourists on the weekend.

On July 8, 2011, SuperVia began operating the cable car, the first mass transit aerial lift passenger system in Brazil. The system consisted of 152 gondolas, each of which could carry 10 passengers, eight seated and two standing, and is 3.5 km in length. The cable car was integrated into the urban rail transport system and had six stations - "Bonsucesso", "Adeus", "Baiana", "Alemão", "Itararé/Alvorada" and "Palmeiras". The line connected to the Saracuruna Line at Bonsucesso Station.

From the first station (Bonsucesso) to last (Palmeiras) took 16 minutes. According to the law signed by Governor Sérgio Cabral, each resident was entitled to two free tickets per day (one-way and one back). A ticket originally cost R$1 but now costs R$5 for the outward trip. The trip back was free. The Cable Car did not run on Sundays or Public Holidays. It ran from Monday to Saturday

Line	Terminals	Connection	Stations	Travel Time
Teleférico A	Palmeiras - Bonsucesso	3.5 km	6	16 min.	Workdays: 06:00 – 21:00; Saturday: 08:00 – 20:00; Sunday and Holidays: 08:00 – 20:00.

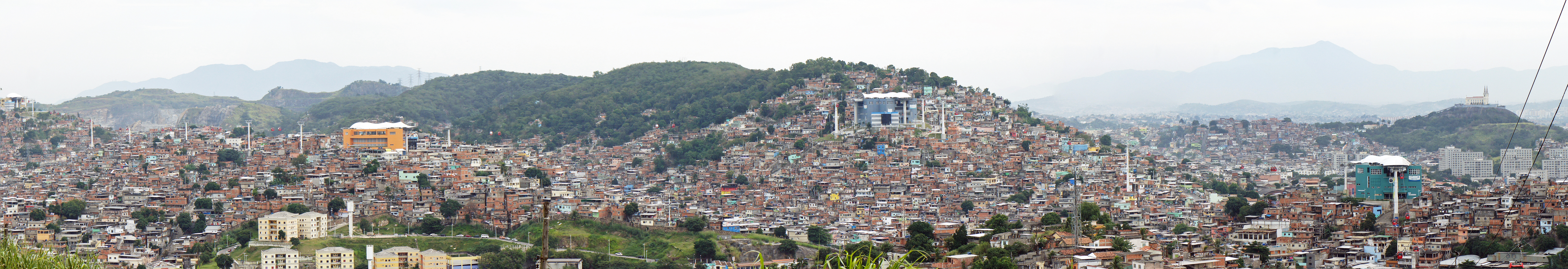
Panoramic view of the Complexo do Alemão. The image shows the gondola lift lines between the stations (from left to right) Palmeiras - Itararé - Alemão - Baiana - Adeus

== Notable people ==
- Tuany Nascimento, ballet teacher

== See also ==
- Complexo - Universo Paralelo, a 2011 documentary film about Complexo do Alemão
- Metrocable (Medellín) and Metrocable (Caracas) similar cable-propelled transit system.
