= Teleférico do Alemão =

Gondola lift service in Rio de Janeiro, Brazil

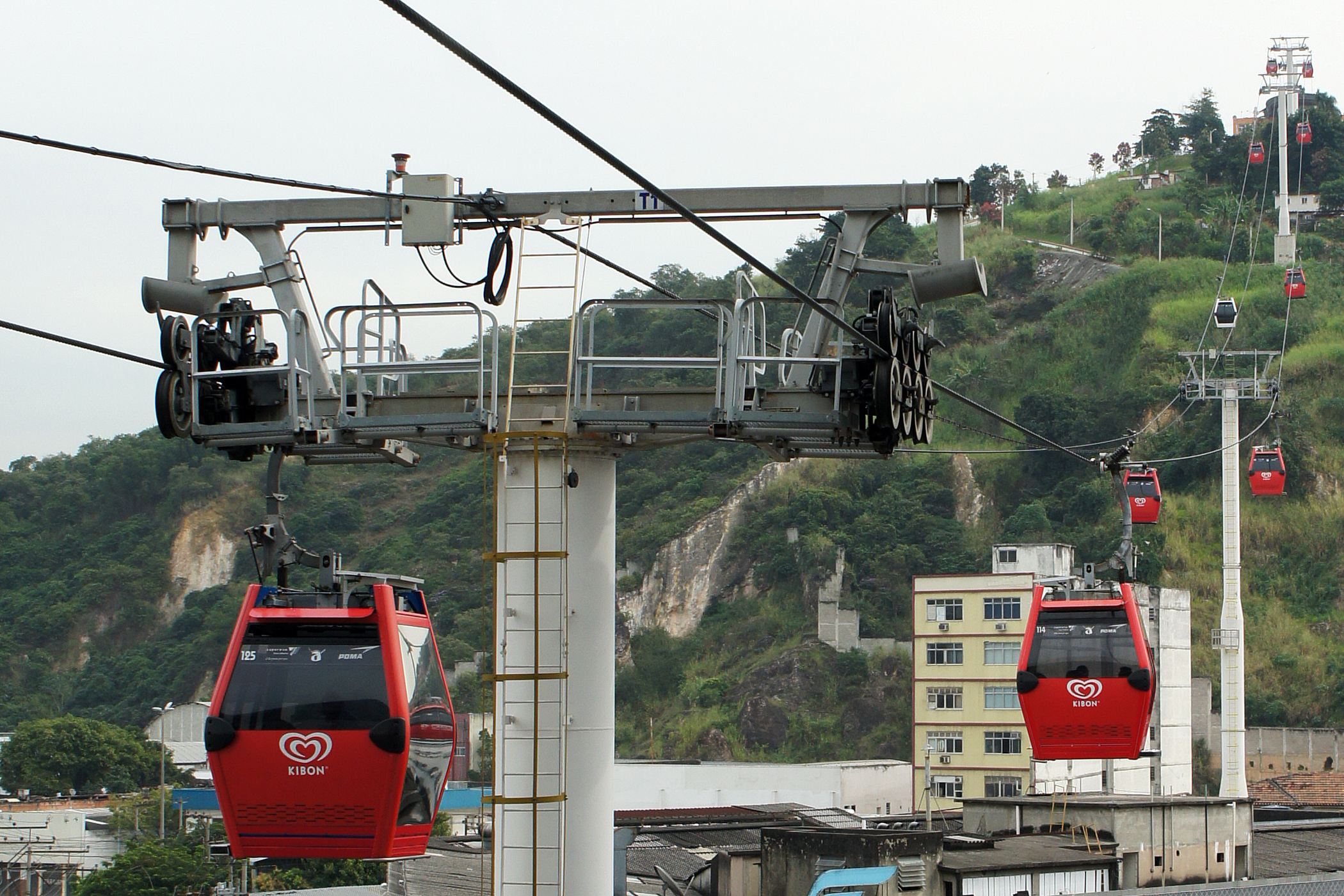
- Many gondolas in operation

Overview
- Service type: Gondola lift
- Status: Suspended
- Locale: Complexo do Alemão, Rio de Janeiro
- First service: 7 July 2011
- Last service: 14 October 2016
- Current operator(s): Rio Teleféricos
- Former operator(s): SuperVia
- Ridership: 10,000 passengers/day (2012)

Route
- Termini: Bonsucesso; Palmeiras
- Stops: 4
- Distance travelled: 3.5 km (2.2 mi)
- Average journey time: 16 minutes

Technical
- Track owner(s): Government of Rio de Janeiro

Teleférico do Alemão was a gondola lift service operating in Rio de Janeiro, Brazil. The service opened on 7 July 2011 and closed in September 2016, following the withdrawal of state funding. The line operated between Bonsucesso Station and Complexo do Alemão, with a total of six stations along the route. The duration of a single ride from start to finish was 16 minutes.

The service, announced as part of PAC 2 (the Brazilian federal funding program for infrastructure) consisted of a 2.1 mile gondola line running above the Complexo do Alemão group of favelas, and cost 210 million Brazilian reais to build. The decision to fund the construction of the line saw heavy criticism, with local media describing it as a vanity project, with the money potentially being better spent elsewhere. The system received 9000 riders daily whilst in operation.

== History ==
The service was inaugurated by Brazilian President Dilma Rousseff, Rio de Janeiro State Governor Sérgio Cabral Filho and Rio de Janeiro City Mayor Eduardo Paes on 7 July 2011. Local residents could apply for a card granting them two free trips a day.

Services were suspended in 2016 because the state couldn't pay the consortium anymore.

== Services ==
The line consisted of six stations between Bonsucesso Station and Palmeiras Station in the Complexo do Alemão favela. The 152 gondolas took 16 minutes to traverse the 3.5 km route.
