= Preta Fernanda =

Lisbon courtesan

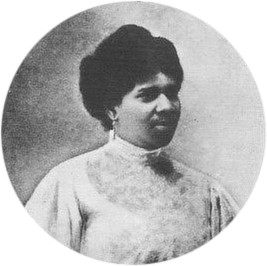
- Portrait of Fernanda from her 1912 book
- Born: Andrêsa do Nascimento; 1859; Ribeira da Barca, Santiago, Cape Verde
- Died: 27 August 1927 (aged 67–68); Lisbon, Portugal
- Other names: Fernanda do Vale
- Occupations: Courtesan, society figure

Andrêsa do Nascimento (1859 – 27 August 1927), known as Preta Fernanda, was a courtesan and celebrated society figure in fin de siècle Lisbon. She was also known as Fernanda do Vale (her pen name). She was, perhaps, the best known black citizen of the city in that period.

Fernanda was born to poor parents in a small village near Ribeira da Barca on the island of Santiago in Cape Verde, probably in 1859. Cape Verde, a volcanic archipelago off the west coast of Africa, was a Portuguese colony and a nexus for the Atlantic slave trade. Although slavery was abolished in Portugal nearly a century earlier, it was only selectively abolished in Cape Verde in 1857 with complete abolition in 1878. It is possible, therefore, that one or both of Fernanda's parents were enslaved when she was born or had been enslaved.

When she was about 19, she sailed away from the small Atlantic island in the company of a ship's captain, Jerónimo Martins, who promised her marriage, but abandoned her once they arrived in Dakar, on the African coast. She subsequently married a German beer maker, Frederick "Fritz" Kemps, who took her to Lisbon, and with whom she had twins. According to some sources her husband died; others say he was habitually drunk and abandoned her.

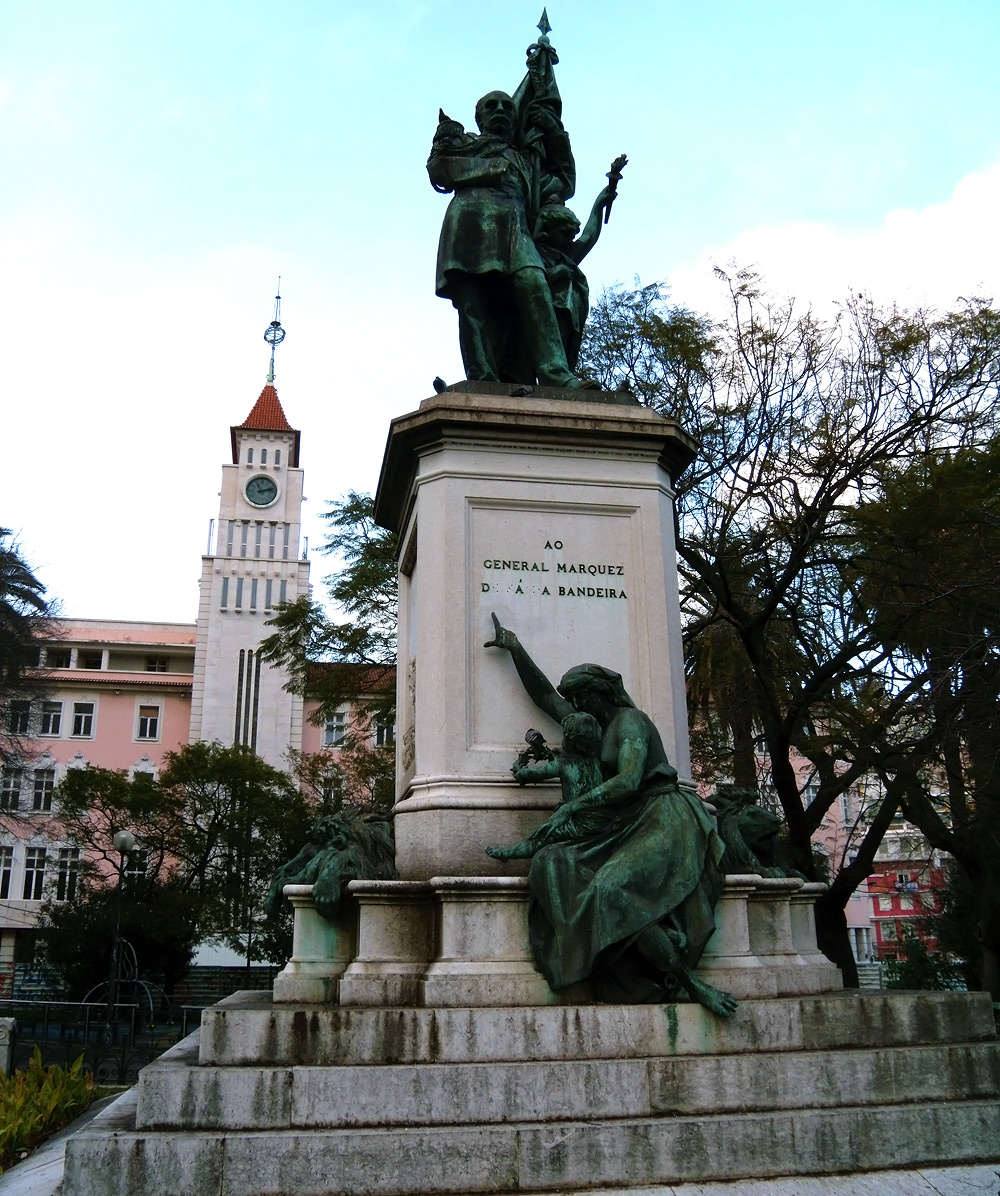
A woman, modeled on Preta Fernanda, points at the Marquis of Sá da Bandeira; Dom Luís Square, Lisbon

Regardless, Fernanda found herself alone again, and in order to support herself and her children, she worked briefly as a model for Italian sculptor Giovanni Ciniselli. She is immortalized in Dom Luís Square in Lisbon as a figure supporting the sculpture of the Marquis of Sá da Bandeira, famed for his abolitionist efforts. Fernanda posed for Ciniselli's depiction of an enslaved African woman, broken chains on her ankles and a child in her lap. The woman faces her child while pointing at the figure of the Marquis above them, as if extolling the nobleman. The sculpture was funded by a public subscription and was unveiled by King Luís I in 1884.

She found steadier work in 1889 as a lady's maid for a high society woman, a member of the influential Cavalcanti family. She stayed in this position for nearly two decades.

After eighteen years, she left the lady's service and, using her savings and her society contacts, opened a brothel in Lisbon's Bairro Alto neighborhood, which she quickly established as a nightly meeting place for writers, politicians and bohemians of the Portuguese capital. Fernanda became one of the most famous courtesans in Lisbon; she had many lovers, from sailors and soldiers to influential writers and legal scholars, and was a regular figure at the hottest night-spots. Glamorous and unafraid of scandal, Fernanda, it is claimed, once fought a bull on horseback in Algés, and she accompanied famed author José Maria de Eça de Queirós to his box at the Teatro da Trindade. She was also, reportedly, the only woman who remained in the room when futurist Almada Negreiros presented his—at the time—shocking Ultimatum Futurista in April 1917.

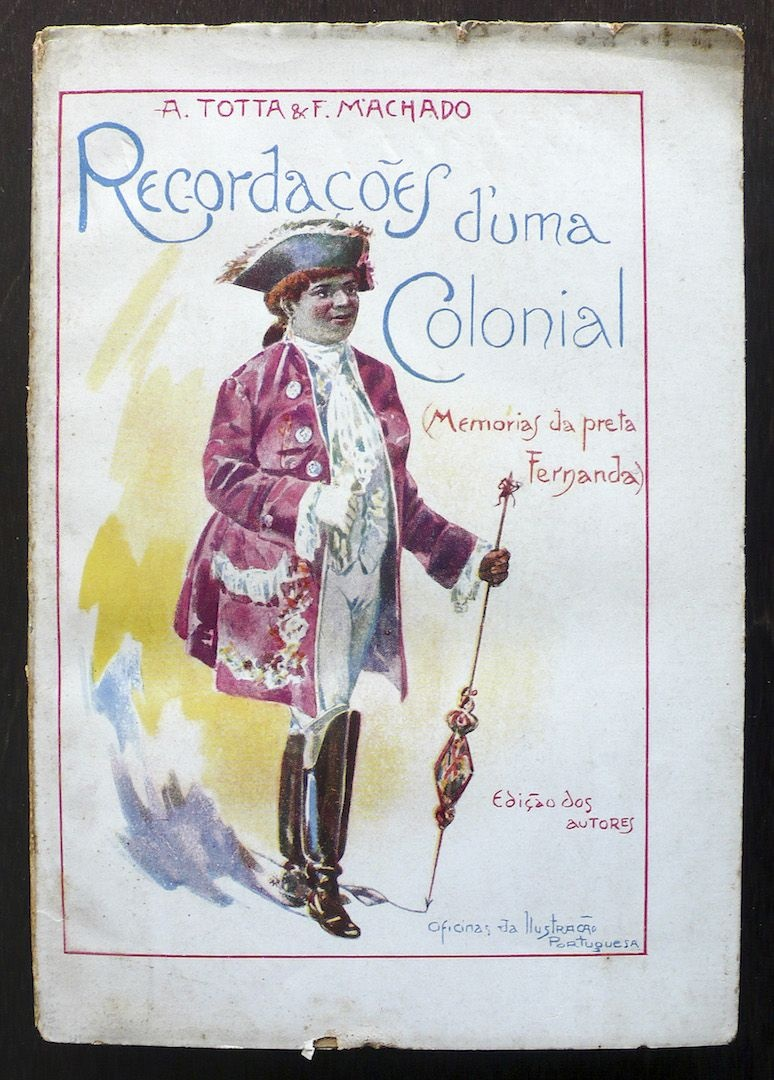
Fernanda dressed as a bull-fighter on the cover of the first edition of Recordações d'uma Colonial

In 1912 Fernanda published an autobiography, Recordações d'uma Colonial (Recollections of a Colonial Subject), written with help from two friends. The memoir tells the story of her life in Cape Verde and Portugal, but the authors sometimes forsook accuracy in favor of a more exciting story. She diligently recorded all of the men who had shared her bed (but not their true names), and in the final chapter offered candid commentary on each man's sexual performance. A modern reader notes that, in today's context, the language of the book is racist and reflects stereotypes of its time.

Little is known of her life after 1912. Fernanda died in Lisbon on 20 August 1927.
