= Tuany Nascimento =

Brazilian dancer, gymnast, and dance teacher

Tuany Tomas Nascimento is a Brazilian ballet dancer, rhythmic gymnast, and dance teacher. She is the founder and director of Na Ponta dos Pés, a dance school that provides ballet training for underprivileged girls living in the favelas of Complexo do Alemão in Rio de Janeiro.

== Biography ==
Tuany Nascimento was born and raised in the Complexo do Alemão of northern Rio de Janeiro. She started training in classical ballet and rhythmic gymnastics as a child. She performed as a dancer and gymnast, representing Brazil at international events, including the World Gymnaestrada, until her career was cut short due to a lack of resources. She began working as a financial assistant after retiring from gymnastics.

In 2012 she launched Na Ponta dos Pés, a dance project providing classical ballet training for girls ages four to fifteen living in the Morro do Adeus favela of Alemão. Her program caters to young women and girls who are from families involved in narcotic wars, extreme poverty, and gang violence. The classes are held at an outdoor sports court in the Morro do Adeus. The program is free for students, who are required to provide their report cards showing they are enrolled in school and passing their classes in order to be eligible.

In 2017 she and her ballet program were the focus of a Vice documentary titled Ballet and Bullets: Dancing Out of the Favela.

Nascimento lives with her mother, stepfather, and five siblings in a two-bedroom apartment on Adeus hill in the Morro do Adeus.
