= Teleférico da Providência =

Gondola lift service in Rio de Janeiro, Brazil

Providência Cable Car
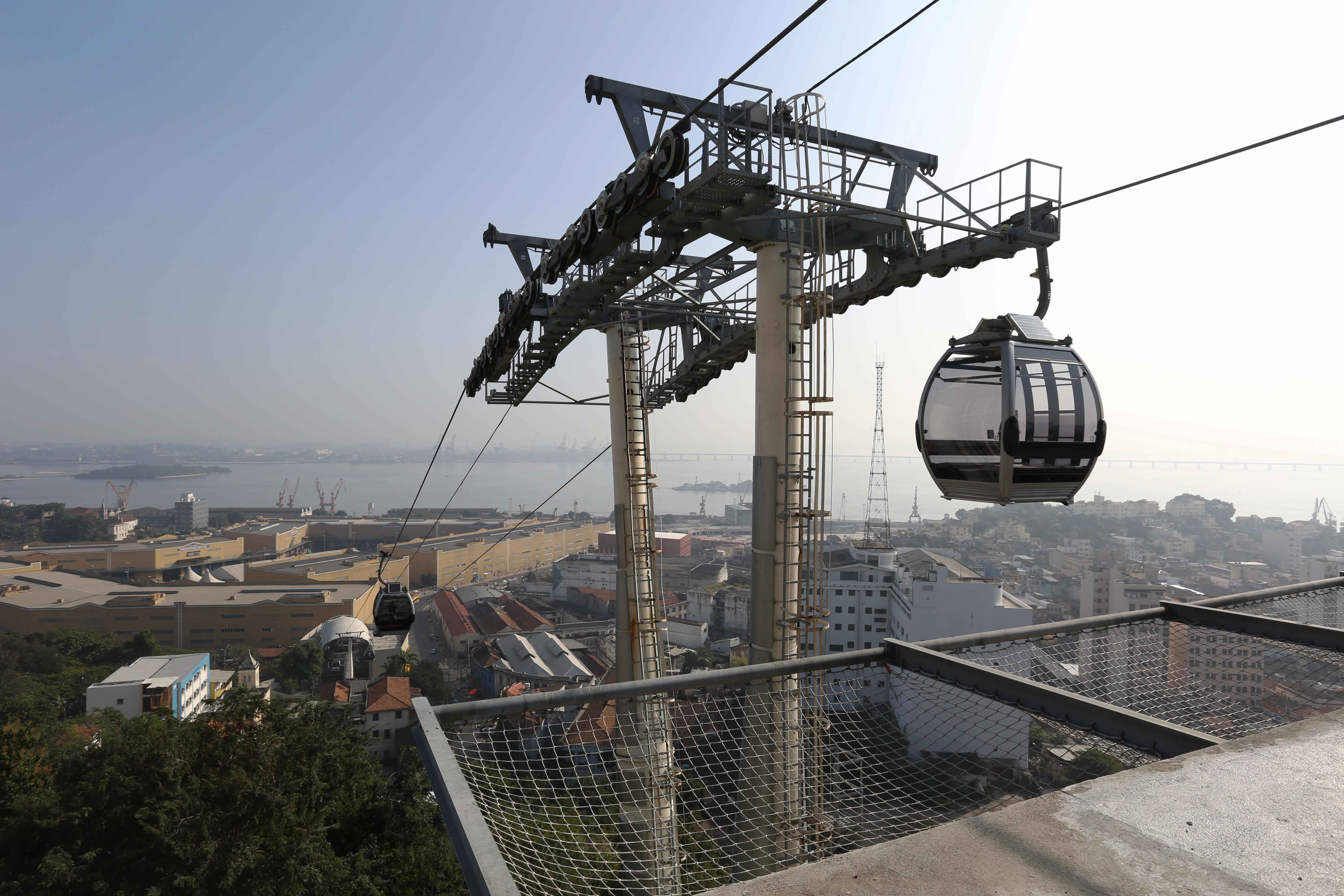
- Gondolas operating between Américo Brum and Gamboa stations

Overview
- Native name: Portuguese: Teleférico da Providência
- Owner: Prefecture of Rio de Janeiro
- Area served: Providência, Rio de Janeiro
- Transit type: Gondola lift
- Number of stations: 3

Operation
- Began operation: 2 July 2014
- Operator: Companhia de Desenvolvimento Urbano da Região do Porto do Rio de Janeiro (CDURP)
- Character: Elevated
- Number of vehicles: 16 gondolas

Technical
- System length: 721 m (2,365 ft)

Teleférico da Providência is a gondola lift service operating in the Central region of Rio de Janeiro, Brazil. The cable car runs between Central do Brasil and Gamboa, Rio de Janeiro, servicing the unofficial neighborhood of Providência.

== Opening ==
The cable car service was opened on 2 July 2014 by Mayor of Rio de Janeiro Eduardo Paes. At opening the operating hours were 9:00 am–11:00 am with plans to phase in increased operating hours of 6:00 am–9:00 pm on weekdays; 7:00 am–7:00 pm on Saturdays; and 9:00 am–6:00 pm on Sundays and holidays. The cable car service closed in December 2016 and has remained closed up until 2024.

On 7 April 2024, the gondolas resumed operation after 7 years suspended and the Rio Prefecture subsidized the costs and it became free for all passengers.
