= Rio de Janeiro Light Rail =

Light rail system in Brazil

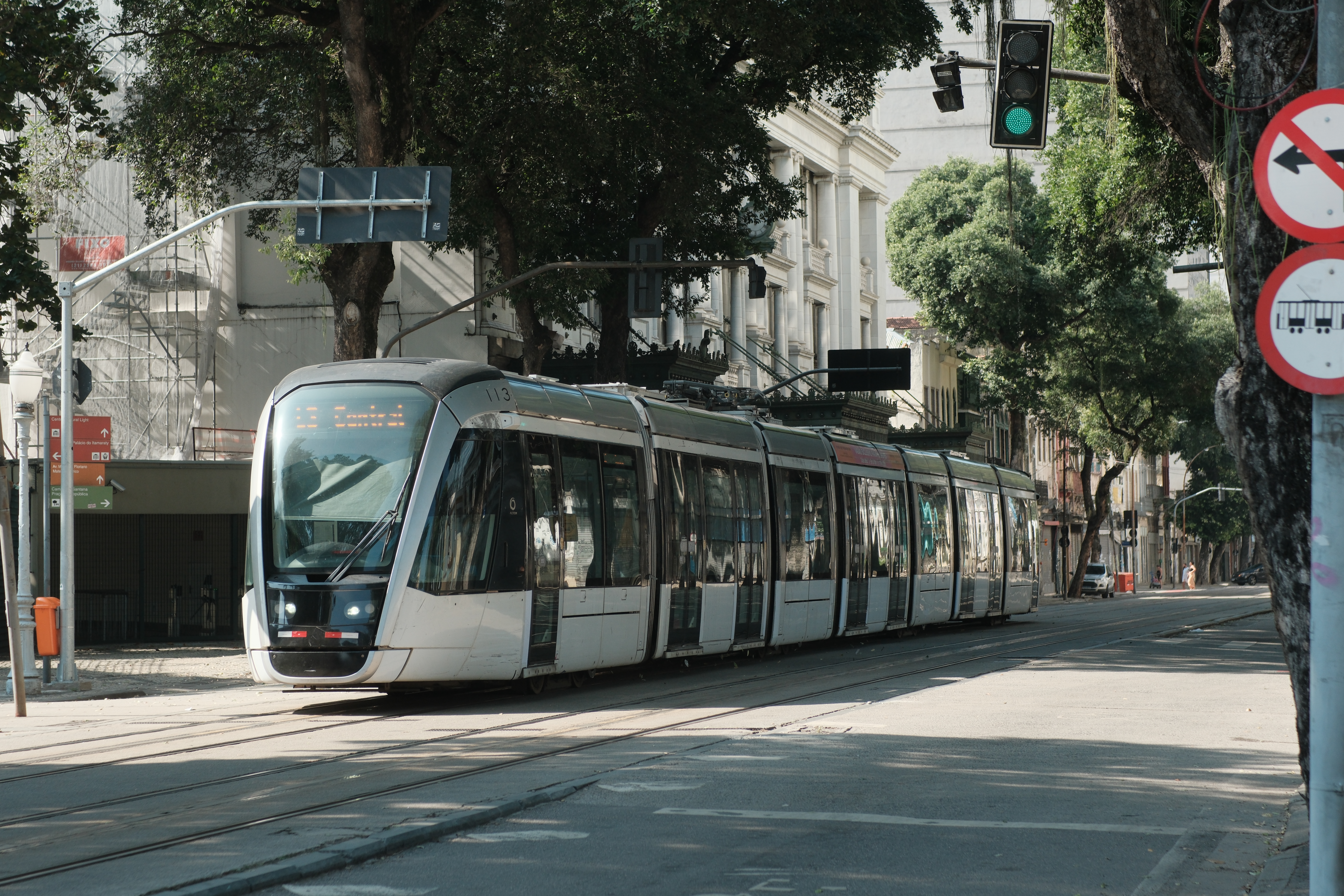

Overview
- Native name: VLT Carioca
- Owner: Municipality of Rio de Janeiro
- Locale: Rio de Janeiro, RJ, Brazil
- Transit type: Light rail
- Number of lines: 4
- Number of stations: 30
- Website: trilhos.motiva.com.br/vltrio/

Operation
- Began operation: 5 June 2016
- Operator: VLT Carioca (Motiva)
- Character: At-grade
- Number of vehicles: 32 Alstom Citadis 402 trams
- Train length: 44 m (144 ft 4 1/4 in)
- Headway: 3-15 minutes 30 minutes (night)

Technical
- System length: 28 km (17 mi)
- Track gauge: 1,435 mm (4 ft 8 1/2 in) standard gauge
- Electrification: 750 V DC (Alstom APS/SRS)
- Average speed: 15 km/h (9.3 mph)
- Top speed: 50 km/h (31 mph)
System map
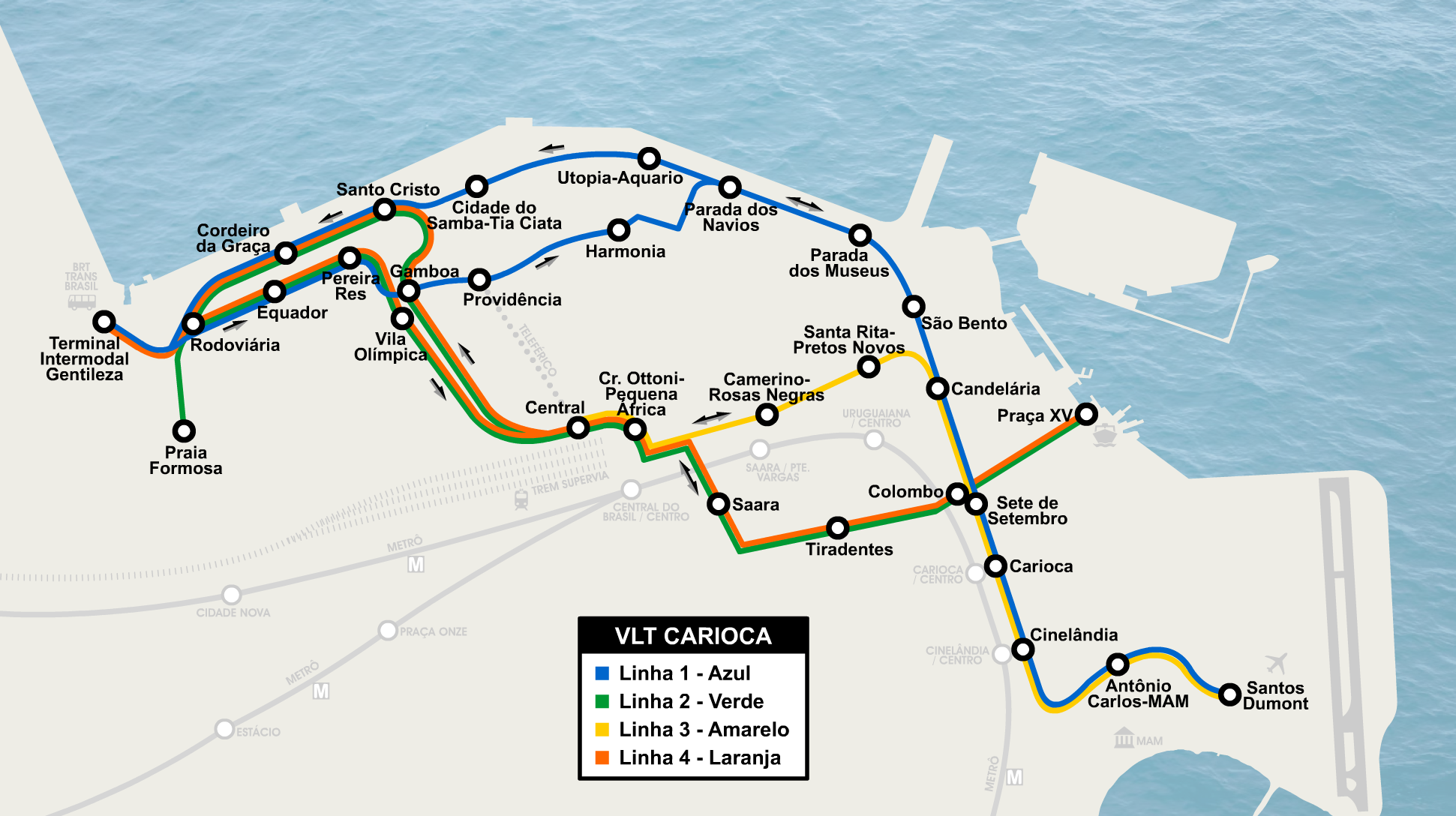

Rio de Janeiro Light Rail (Portuguese: VLT Carioca) is a modern light rail system serving Rio de Janeiro, Brazil. The system is among several new public transport developments in the region ahead of the city's successful bid for the 2016 Summer Olympics. Its official name is VLT Carioca, the initialism "VLT" (which stands for veículo leve sobre trilhos, literally light vehicle on rails) being equivalent to the English term light rail.

== Overview ==
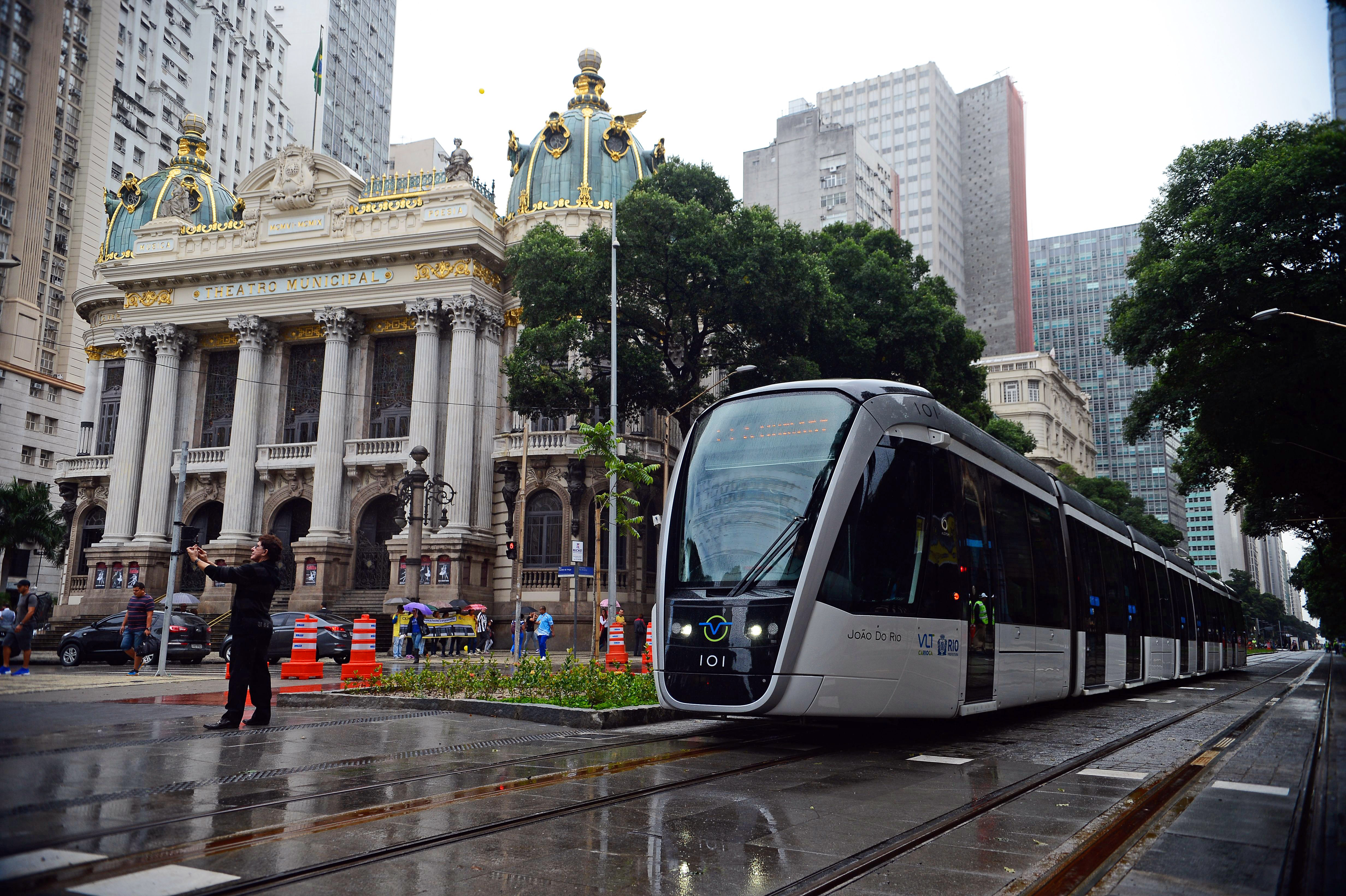
The inaugural LRT service passing Rio de Janeiro's Theatro Municipal.

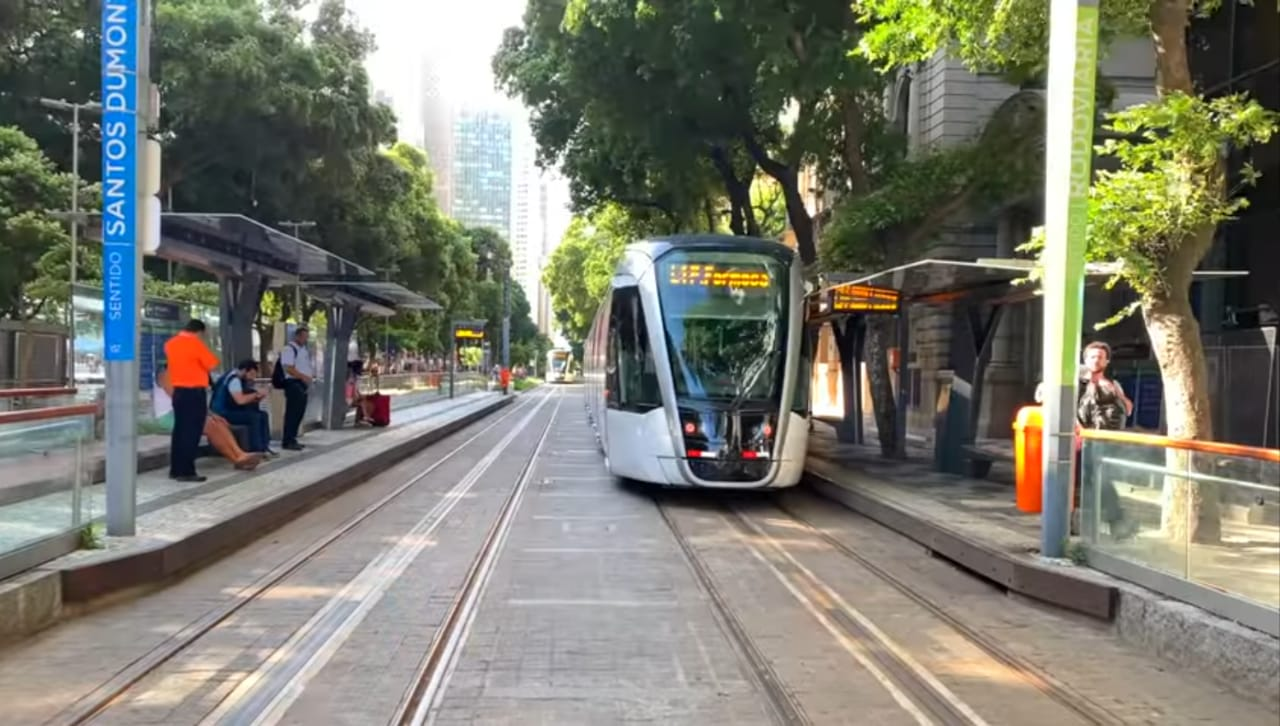
Light rail at Cinelândia station.

The first phase, consisting of a single 15-kilometre line between the Novo Rio Bus Terminal and Santos Dumont Airport and 18 stops, was inaugurated on 5 June 2016, two months ahead of the Olympics opening ceremony, with regular service beginning the following day. For the first month of operation, it was free of charge to ride, but only two trams were in service between noon and 15:00 on the section between Parada dos Museus in Praça Mauá and Santos Dumont Airport. The remainder of the line was opened and service was expanded to full-time operation on 12 July, although only 16 of the 18 stops on the line are in use.

The network uses 32 Alstom Citadis 402 low-floor trams carrying 420 passengers each. They are bi-directional, air-conditioned, have seven sections, and eight doors per side. The first five trams were built in Alstom's facility in La Rochelle, France and shipped to Rio in July 2015, and the remaining 27 were built in Alstom's facility in Taubaté, in the state of São Paulo.

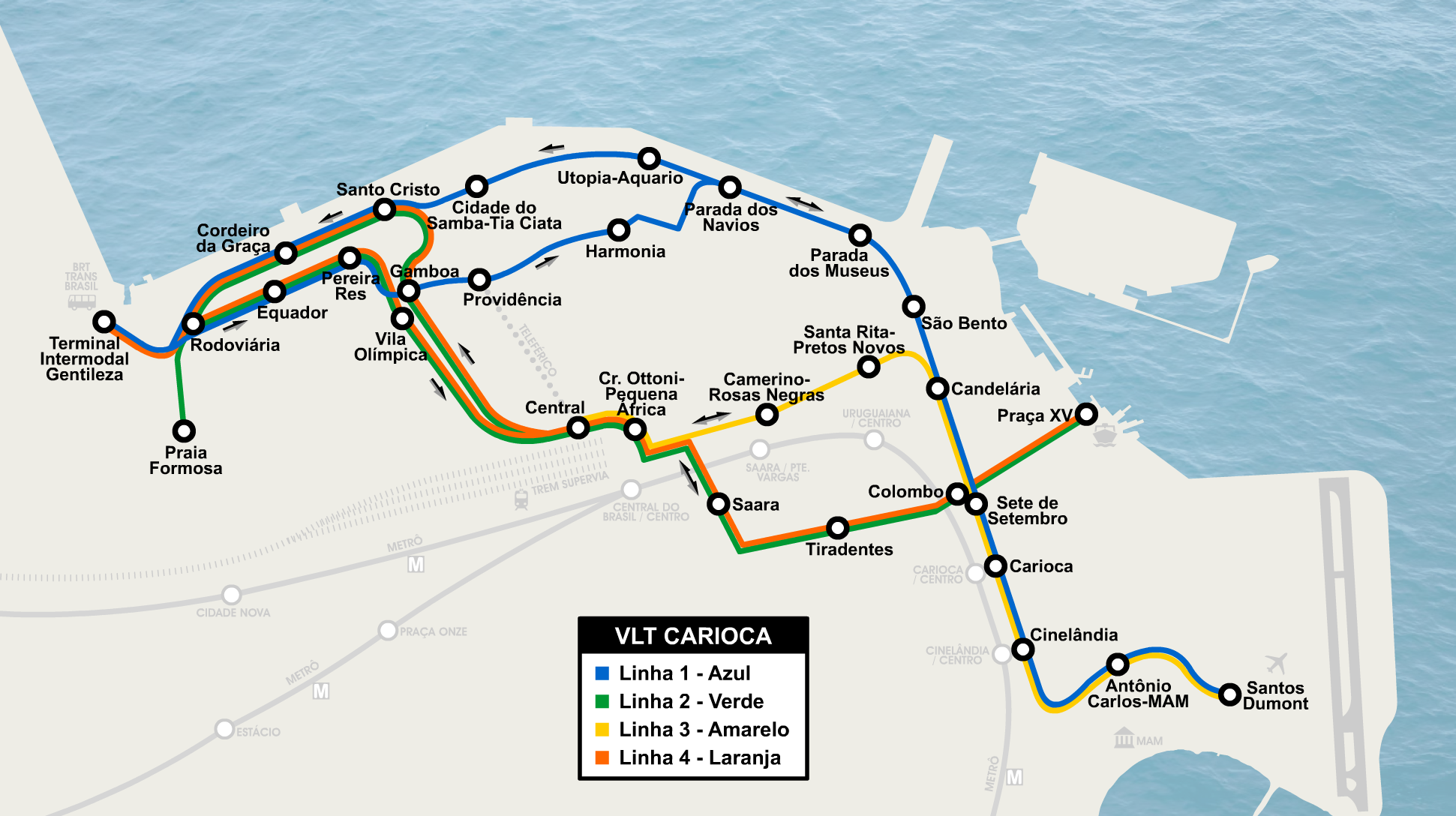
Map of the VLT Carioca.

There are no overhead lines installed along the entire route. Instead, Alstom has equipped approximately 80% of the line with its proprietary ground-level power supply (APS) system. The remaining 20% uses on-board supercapacitor-based energy storage (SRS), also developed by Alstom. Trams are still equipped with pantographs for use in the maintenance facility.

The remainder of the three-line, 28-km network will open in stages by the end of 2017. It is estimated that when the entire network is at full capacity, it would be able to reduce 60% of buses and 15% of automobile traffic circulating in the city centre.

== See also ==
- Rio de Janeiro Metro (rail rapid transit)
- SuperVia (commuter rail)
