= SuperVia =

Brazilian train operator

- SuperVia logo

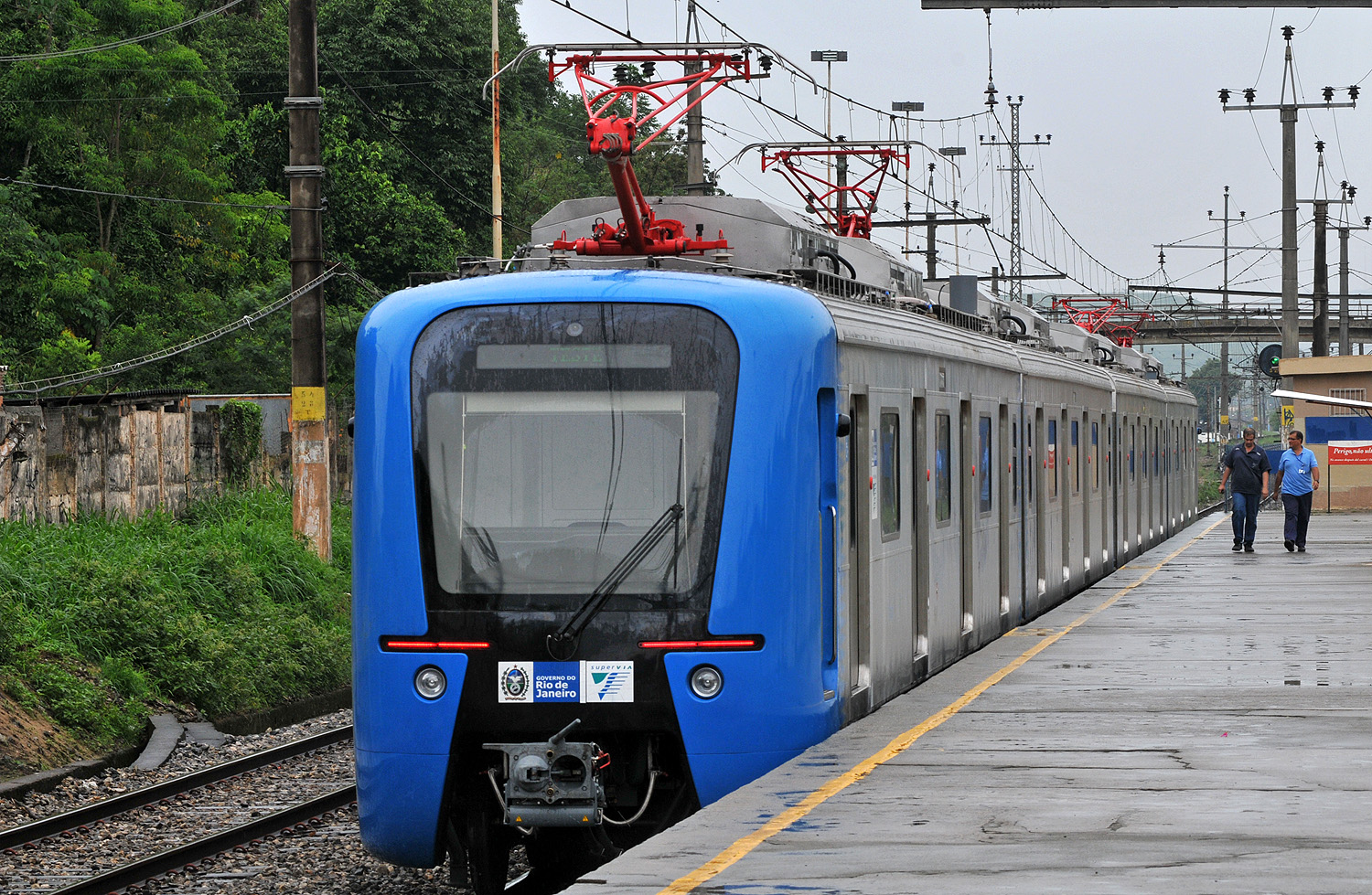
- A Series 3000 train departing a platform

Overview
- Owner: Government of the State of Rio de Janeiro
- Area served: Greater Rio de Janeiro
- Transit type: Commuter rail
- Number of lines: 8
- Number of stations: 104
- Daily ridership: ▼300,000/business day (2021)
- Annual ridership: ▼97.958.268 (2020) (-39.9% ▼)
- Chief executive: Antônio Carlos Sanches
- Headquarters: Rio de Janeiro, Brazil
- Website: www.supervia.com.br

Operation
- Began operation: 1 November 1998; 28 years ago
- Operator: SuperVia
- Character: At-grade
- Rolling stock: 57 Vickers-Cammell/FNV/Cobrasma/Santa Matilde/Mafersa Series 200/1000 (19 trains); 90 Santa Matilde/FNV/Cobrasma/General Electric Series 400 (30 trains); 95 Hitachi/Nippon Sharyo Series 500 (23 trains); 100 Mafersa/Hitachi Series 700 (25 trains); 32 Santa Matilde/Villares/GEC Traction/MAN Series 800/8000 (8 trains); 104 Francorail/Cobrasma/MTE/BBC/Traction Cem Oerlikon/Jeumont-Schneider Series 900/9000 (26 trains); 80 Hyundai Rotem Series 2005 (20 trains); 400 CNR Series 3000 (100 trains); 160 Alstom Series 4000 (20 trains); 48 Alstom Series 5000 (6 trains)
- Number of vehicles: 204 trains
- Headway: 4 minutes–30 minutes

Technical
- System length: 270 km (170 mi)
- Track gauge: 1,600 mm (5 ft 3 in); 1,000 mm (3 ft 3 3/8 in)
- Electrification: 3,000 V DC catenary
- Top speed: 90 km/h (56 mph)
System map

SuperVia Trens Urbanos (Portuguese pronunciation: [ˌsupeʁˈvi.ɐ tɾẽzuʁˈbɐ̃nuʃ]) (English: SuperVia Urban Trains) was a rapid transit and commuter rail company operator, founded in Rio de Janeiro (Brazil) in November 1998. In February 2026 was sold to TrensRJ with a transition phase until June. It carried around 750,000 passengers a day on a railroad network comprising 104 stations in 12 cities: Rio de Janeiro, Duque de Caxias, Guapimirim, Nova Iguaçu, Nilópolis, Mesquita, Queimados, São João de Meriti, Belford Roxo, Japeri, Paracambi and Magé.

The baggage areas of SuperVia trains were an adaptation of the original design to fit the Brazilian reality. A Brazilian study found that the average passenger carries a weight of 7 kg in backpacks, shopping bags or briefcases on their daily commute.

== History ==
In 1998, a concession agreement commenced, which established the concessionaire's investment commitments (SuperVia) and grantor (State). Thus, it was possible to realise savings for the state coffers of more than US$1.6 billion, a figure corresponding to the subsidies that the state failed to spend with the operation of the system in the period 1998/2009.

Since the turn of the century, the number of passengers carried had increased and the system had seen significant improvement in compliance with the scheduling of trains, which are monitored on an ongoing basis by the government, through the regulatory agency.

In 1998, before the grant, 145,000 passengers were transported per day, with a punctuality of less than 30%. In 2009, over 510,000 passengers were transported per day, with an average punctuality of 90%, the highest rate ever recorded in the history of the system.

== Modernization ==
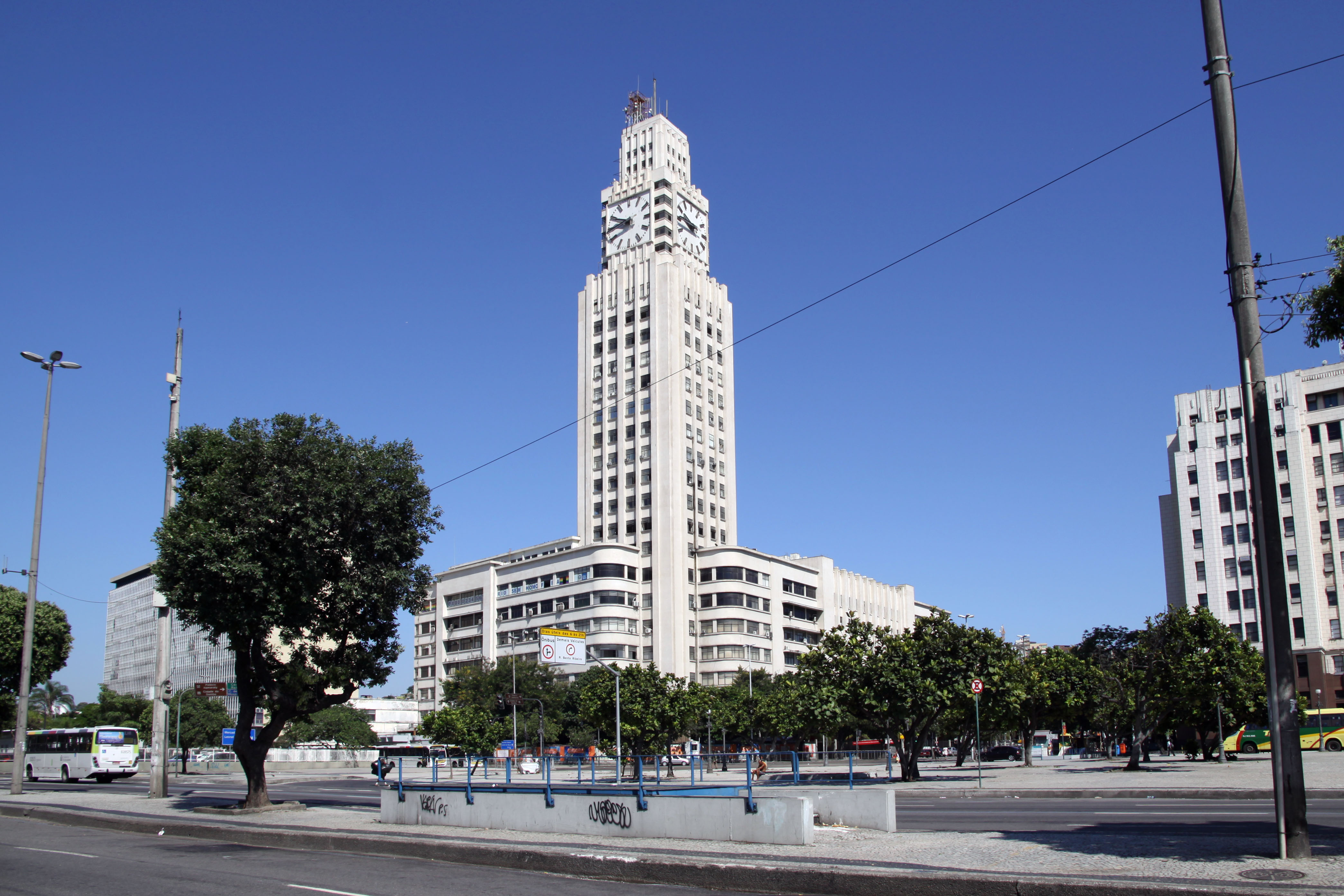
Central do Brasil Train Station.

With the arrival of 30 new trains in 2011, 14 previous SuperVia train configurations were withdrawn from circulation. Capable of carrying 1,300 passengers, the new trains have several technical advantages, such as alternating current traction motors, air conditioning with automatic temperature control, automatic coupling system, door system with detection of obstruction, electronic billboards and onboard displays, sound equipment, security cameras, lubrication system friezes, intercom and emergency signaling devices in accordance with the accessibility standard (NBR 14021).

Trains also have cameras on the sides (mirror type), which allows monitoring by the driver of any platform without having to move away from the coDirectoradeand post in the cabin. The blue color is used (which is the color of the state and also a color of SuperVia). Made of fiber, the seats have a padded backrest in synthetic fabric. There are eight seats of a different color on each car and in the engine cars, there are special spaces for wheelchair users. And centers located in the fore sections of the cars serve to transmit information to passengers. Four cameras are installed in each car, allowing the driver to have visual surveillance of any emergency request. Four LCD televisions are installed, with the goal of enabling business partnerships and educational and government institutions.

In July 2021, the company announced that some trains would have free internet connection. The trains that have the service are the 3000 Series, with 8 cars and air conditioning, and circulates through different branches. The service is available in 3 trains only. The network was available for a year, as a result of a partnership with Eletromídia and Magazine Luiza. For any customer in one of these train sets, identified with Magazine Luiza stickers, the internet access were free for 30 minutes, which would be automatically renewed without the need for a new login, for another 30 minutes.

== Lines ==
System Map

Line	Termini	Length	Stations	Gauge
Deodoro	Central do Brasil ↔ Deodoro	23 km (14 mi)	19	1,600 mm (5 ft 3 in)
Santa Cruz	Central do Brasil ↔ Santa Cruz	54.75 km (34.02 mi)	34	1,600 mm (5 ft 3 in)
Japeri	Central do Brasil ↔ Japeri	61.75 km (38.37 mi)	20	1,600 mm (5 ft 3 in)
Paracambi	Japeri ↔ Paracambi	8.26 km (5.13 mi)	3	1,600 mm (5 ft 3 in)
Belford Roxo	Central do Brasil ↔ Belford Roxo	27.7 km (17.2 mi)	19	1,600 mm (5 ft 3 in)
Saracuruna	Central do Brasil ↔ Gramacho ↔ Saracuruna	34.02 km (21.14 mi)	20	1,600 mm (5 ft 3 in)
Vila Inhomirim	Saracuruna ↔ Vila Inhomirim	15.35 km (9.54 mi)	8	1,000 mm (3 ft 3 3/8 in)
Guapimirim	Saracuruna ↔ Guapimirim	17.3 km (10.7 mi)	15	1,000 mm (3 ft 3 3/8 in)

=== Special services ===
Line	Termini	Type	Stations
Bangu	Central do Brasil ↔ Bangu	Express	8
Campo Grande	Central do Brasil ↔ Campo Grande	Express	12
Gramacho	Central do Brasil ↔ Gramacho	Express	5

=== Planned ===
Line	Termini	Length	Stations	Opening
Itaguaí	Santa Cruz ↔ Itaguaí	10 km (6.2 mi)	5	TBA
Barrinha	Japeri ↔ Barra do Piraí	46 km (29 mi)	11	TBA

== Aerial tramway/cable car of the "Complexo do Alemão" favela ==
Public transport map with SuperVia routes.

On 8 July 2011, SuperVia began operating the "Complexo do Alemão" slum cable car, the first mass transit aerial lift passenger system in Brazil. The cable car is integrated into the urban rail transport system and has six stations - "Bonsucesso", "Adeus", "Baiana", "Alemão", "Itararé/Alvorada" and "Palmeiras". The system consists of 152 gondolas, each of which can carry 10 passengers, eight seated and two standing, and is 3.5 km in length.

From the first station (Bonsucesso) to last (Palmeiras) takes 16 minutes. According to the law signed by Governor Sérgio Cabral, each resident is entitled to two free tickets per day (one-way and one back). The unit rate will cost R$1. In 2013, the fare for tourists and visitors increased to R$5 (2013) (US$2.32). The value did not increase for residents, at first.

A month after the end of the 2016 Olympics, the Alemão Cable Car closed for a six-month maintenance period - and it has never returned. Inaugurated in July 2011 with the presence of then-president Dilma Rousseff, the 3.6 km (2.2 mi) cable project in the complex of 17 communities in the north of Rio has been out of action for almost five years and has no expected return.

An investigation from CADE, reported that the construction company Odebrecht received from the state, in total R$843 million (2011) (US$503.94 million) for the housing, health, education, sports and transport interventions in the Complexo do Alemão. According to a report by the Comptroller General of the Union (CGU), the price charged by the consortium had an overpricing of R$47 million (2011) (US$28.1 million).

As of 2021, the Governor of Rio de Janeiro, Cláudio Castro, closed an agreement to reactivate the cable car. Castro and Government Secretaries met in France with the company Poma, which implemented the transport system. The 3.6 km route, cost R$210 million (2011) (US$125.54 million), and suffered depredation and many parts were stolen since its deactivation in October 2016, without working for half that time, in one of the poorest areas of Rio.

Line	Terminals
Teleférico A	Palmeiras - Bonsucesso

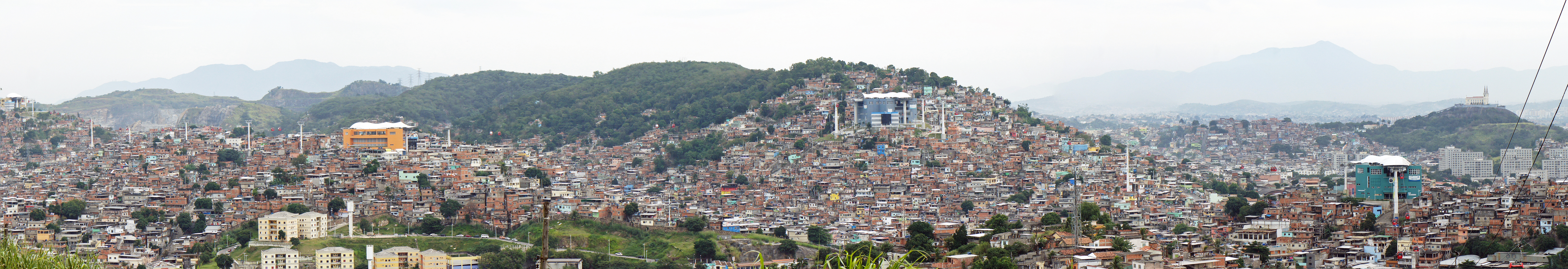
Panoramic view of the aerial tramway/cable car system at the Complexo do Alemão slum. The image shows the lines between the stations (from left to right) Palmeiras - Itararé - Alemão - Baiana - Adeus

== Pandemic and continuous operational trouble ==
In 2010 then-governor Sérgio Cabral renewed the concession until 2048, without a bidding process, despite the inefficiency in managing metropolitan trains.

In 2013, SuperVia received R$3.4 billion (2013) (US$1.58 billion) to purchase new trains, and invest in the improvement of the metropolitan train system. BNDES released R$1.6 billion (2013) (US$742.08 million), R$1.8 billion (2013) (US$834.84 million) from the state government and the rest of the company's cash. It is one of the most expensive tickets in the country, even without any improvement in the system. Of the current 201 trains, only 75% are new.

An investigation by the Extra RJ newspaper found that a train derailed every 2 months, between January 2017 and August 2019. In addition, the company has several convictions for failure to comply with the obligations established in the contract.

Since March 2020, the concessionaire claims that it lost half its passengers during the pandemic, and it has accumulated a financial loss of R$474 million (US$84.75 million) as a result of a reduction of more than 102 million passengers until June 2, 2021.

Before the pandemic, the concessionaire transported around 600,000 passengers daily. SuperVia claims that the daily flow has stabilized at 300,000 passengers and has estimated that it needs a daily average of 450,000 passengers to cover operating costs.

Even so, throughout the period of the pandemic, passengers complained about the capacity and lack of conditions. On May 28, a train on the Belford Roxo branch caught fire on the stretch between Del Castilho and Pilares stations. According to the Fire Department, 3 people were injured during the disembarkation, made in haste, between the tracks. A firefighter reported that a composition's extinguisher was empty and could not be used to fight the flames.

The company had also a total of 29.18 kilometres (18.13 mi) of cables stolen from January to November 15, 2021, the quantity of materials taken is already more than triple the total that was replaced by the company in 2020 after the criminal action, when there were 355 cases and 7.47 km (4.64 mi) of stolen cables. The situation worsens on the Japeri branch, which had 323 occurrences and 15.78 km (9.81 mi) cables taken, especially in the regions of Japeri, Queimados and Nova Iguaçu. This means a cost of R$1.5 million with the replacement of this material, this year alone. According to SuperVia, the biggest loss, is for customers, since from January to October more than 1,102 trips were canceled or interrupted. To mitigate actions of this type, the company made adjustments in the installation of cables that result in a cost three times higher than the traditional model.

== Judicial recovery ==
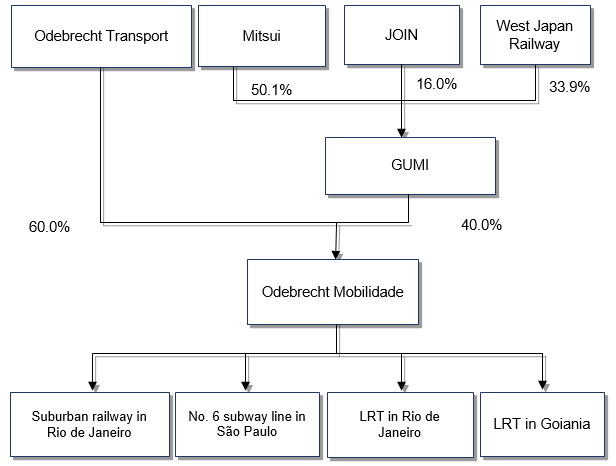
SuperVia equity share after a partial sale, 2015

As of June 2021, the concessionaire claims that it lost half its passengers during the pandemic and accumulates a debt of around R$1.2 billion (US$214.55 million) and that the Judicial request to the Court of Justice of Rio de Janeiro is to preserve the provision of services to passengers and initiate a cycle of negotiations with creditors. The company would keep its activities even with the request for recovery.

The company, as well as the entire passenger system in Rio de Janeiro, did not have any government subsidy and basically supports itself with funds from ticket sales. With the worsening of the pandemic and the economic crisis, the full recovery of the flow of passengers was expected for 2023, according to company figures.

On April 13, Agetransp (Transport Regulatory Agency of the State of Rio de Janeiro) recognized the responsibility of the Grantor to promote emergency reimbursement to Supervia of R$216 million (US$38.62 million), corresponding to the supplementation of the concessionaire's minimum costs to ensure continued operation during the pandemic. SuperVia operates urban train services in Rio de Janeiro and eleven other municipalities in the Metropolitan Region and Baixada Fluminense, through a railway network of 270 km (170 mi), divided into five branches, three extensions and 104 stations.

The company is controlled by Guarana Urban Mobility Incorporated Brasil (GUMI), a consortium formed by the Japanese Mitsui and West Japan Railway Company, in addition to JOIN, a Japanese fund. In 2019, Odebrecht TransPort S.A. (OTP) sold the company for R$800 million (2019) (US$202.81 million), they kept control of 11.33% of the company.

== In popular culture ==
=== In cinema ===
- The film Central Station, by Walter Salles, is set in the station of the same name.
- Madureira train station appears in the film Boca de Ouro (The Golden Mouth) (1963), by Nelson Pereira dos Santos.
- Madureira train station appears in the telenovela Pão-Pão, Beijo-Beijo, by Gonzaga Blota, Henrique Martins and Atílio Riccó (1983)

== See also ==
- Rio de Janeiro Light Rail
- Santa Teresa Tram
