= Landru (film) =

- Directed by: Claude Chabrol
- Written by: Françoise Sagan
- Produced by: Georges de Beauregard; Carlo Ponti
- Starring: Charles Denner; Michèle Morgan; Danielle Darrieux; Hildegard Knef
- Cinematography: Jean Rabier
- Edited by: Jacques Gaillard
- Music by: Pierre Jansen
- Production companies: Compagnia Cinematografica Champion; Rome Paris Films
- Distributed by: Lux Compagnie Cinématographique de France
- Release date: 25 January 1963
- Running time: 119 minutes
- Countries: France; Italy
- Language: French

Landru (US title: Bluebeard) is a 1963 crime drama film directed by Claude Chabrol. The screenplay was written by Françoise Sagan. The film stars Charles Denner, Michèle Morgan, Danielle Darrieux and Hildegard Knef.

It was based on the story of French serial killer Henri Désiré Landru, who murdered and dismembered more than 10 women during World War I.

== Plot ==
During World War I, the seemingly respectable middle-aged man Henri Landru has devised an ingenious means of obtaining money to supplement his dwindling income. Adopting various assumed names, he lures middle-class women to his villa at Gambais, just outside Paris. There he kills them and burns their bodies. He then helps himself to his victims’ bank accounts, so that he can keep his wife, his mistress and his four children in the manner to which they have grown accustomed.

Having murdered ten women and one boy, Landru is finally captured and placed before a court of law. Eloquent in his protestations of innocence, he is confident that no jury will condemn a man of such intellect and breeding.

== Cast ==
- Charles Denner - Henri Désiré Landru
- Danielle Darrieux - Berthe Héon
- Michèle Morgan - Celestine Buisson
- Juliette Mayniel - Anna Collomb
- Stéphane Audran - Fernande Segret
- Mary Marquet - Mme. Guillin
- Pierre Vernier as a magistrate
- Henri Attal
- Serge Bento - Maurice Landru
- André Fouché - Doctor Paul
- Sacha Briquet - Assistant prosecutor
- Robert Burnier - Presiding judge
- Mario David - Prosecutor
- Françoise Lugagne - Mme. Landru
- Claude Mansard - Defense Attorney
- Jean-Louis Maury - Commissioner Belin
- Jean-Pierre Melville - Georges Mandel
- Hildegard Knef - Madame Ixe
- Denise Provence - Mme. Laporte
- Raymond Queneau - Georges Clemenceau
- Catherine Rouvel - Andrée Babelay
- Dominique Zardi - Gendarme
