= The Turkey (film) =

1951 film

- Directed by: Claude Barma
- Written by: Jacques Emmanuel
- Based on: Le Dindon by Georges Feydeau
- Produced by: Robert Dorfmann; Fred Orain
- Starring: Nadine Alari; Jacqueline Pierreux; Denise Provence
- Cinematography: Jacques Mercanton
- Edited by: Florence Manier
- Music by: Gérard Calvi
- Production companies: Silver Films; Armor Films
- Distributed by: Les Films Corona
- Release date: 21 November 1951
- Running time: 85 minutes
- Country: France
- Language: French

The Turkey (French: Le Dindon) is a 1951 French period comedy film directed by Claude Barma and starring Nadine Alari, Jacqueline Pierreux and Denise Provence. It is an adaptation of Georges Feydeau's 1896 play Le Dindon. It was shot at the Epinay Studios in Paris. The film's sets were designed by the art director Henri Schmitt.

== Synopsis ==
In Paris during the Belle Epoque, Monsieur Pontagnac loves his wife but also has a wandering eye that gets him into trouble. This happens particularly when he becomes entangled with Lucienne Vatelin, the wife of a lawyer. A variety of other characters have various suspicions and intrigue and all gather at the same hotel with farcical results.

== Cast ==
- Nadine Alari as Lucienne Vatelin, the notary's wife
- Jacqueline Pierreux as Armandine
- Denise Provence as Clotilde Pontagnac
- Gisèle Préville as Maggy Pacarel
- Jane Marken as Mrs Pinchard
- Louis Seigner as Mr Pinchard
- Jacques Charon as Mr Pontagnac
- Robert Hirsch as Mr Rédillon
- Jacques Morel as Maître Vatelin, notary and Lucienne's husband
- Pierre Larquey as Géronte
- Fred Pasquali as Mr Pascarel
- Louis de Funès as the manager
- Gaston Orbal as the commissioner
- Paul Bisciglia as Victor, the groom
- Léon Berton as the night look-out
- Marcel Méral as the second commissioner
- Georges Bever as a client
- Émile Mylo as Mr Grossback
- Jean Sylvère as the clerk

== Bibliography ==
- Hayward, Susan. French Costume Drama of the 1950s: Fashioning Politics in Film. Intellect Books, 2010.
