= Henri Désiré Landru =

French serial killer (1869–1922)

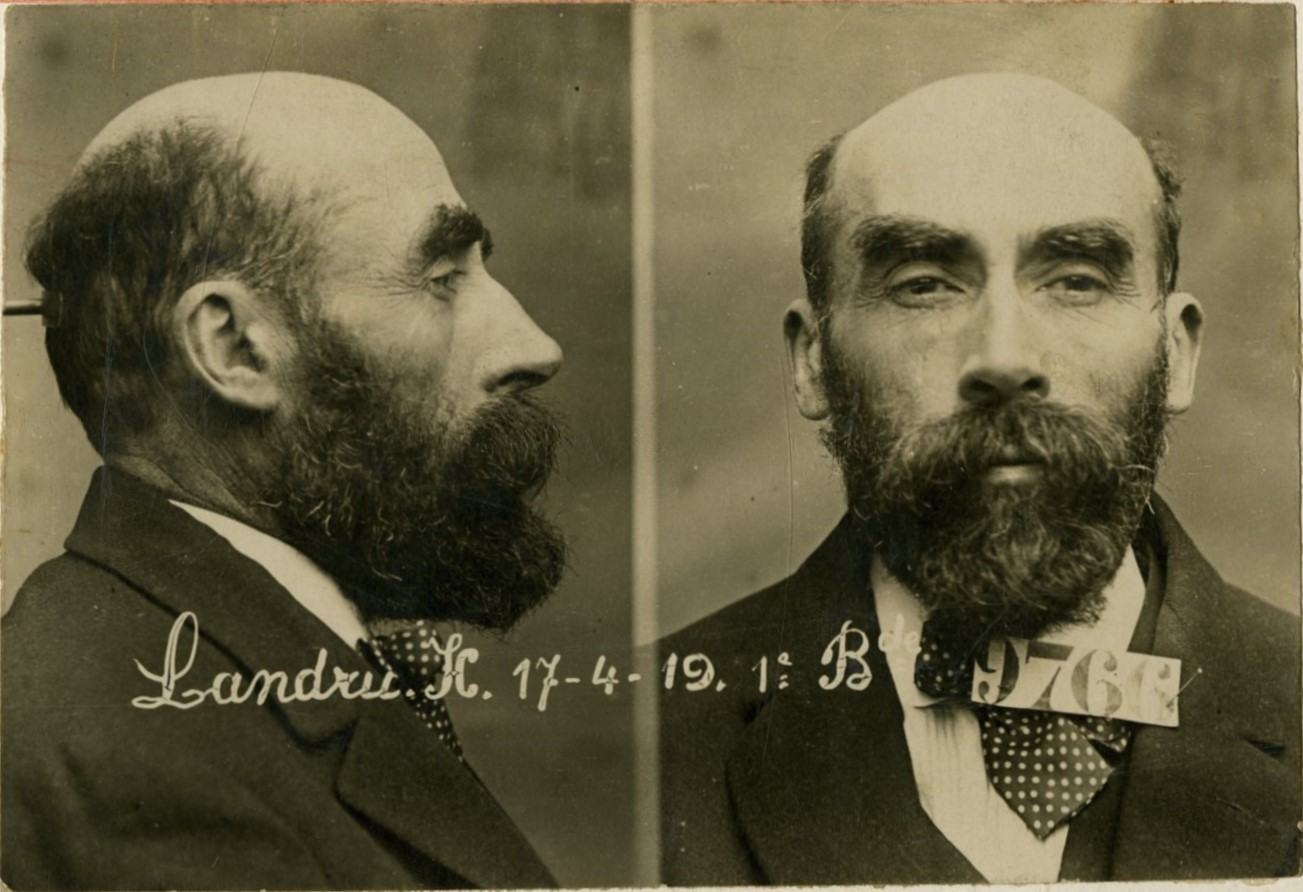
- Landru photographed 17 April 1919
- Born: Henri Désiré Landru; 12 April 1869; Paris, France
- Died: 25 February 1922 (aged 52); Versailles, France
- Cause of death: Execution by guillotine
- Resting place: Cimetière des Gonards, Versailles (unmarked grave)
- Other names: The Bluebeard of Gambais; The Lady Killer; The Red Man of Gambais; many pseudonyms, including "Monsieur Diard", "Dupont", "Georges Frémyet", "Lucien Guillet"
- Occupations: Inventor, furniture dealer, fraudster
- Spouse: Marie-Catherine Rémy (m. 1893)
- Children: 4
- Conviction: Assassination (11 counts) (30 November 1921)
- Penalty: Death (30 November 1921)

Details
- Victims: 11 confirmed (André Cuchet, 10 women); possibly more
- Span of crimes: January 1915 – 13 January 1919
- Country: France
- Date apprehended: 12 April 1919

Henri Désiré Landru (12 April 1869 – 25 February 1922) (French pronunciation: [ɑ̃ʁi deziʁe lɑ̃dʁy]) was a French serial killer, nicknamed the Bluebeard of Gambais and a prolific marriage fraudster. He is confirmed to have murdered at least ten women and the teenage son of his first victim, primarily targeting lonely war widows whom he met through newspaper advertisements, seduced, defrauded of their assets, and then killed, disposing of their bodies by burning them in his stove. He committed these crimes between December 1914 and January 1919, first at a house in Vernouillet and later at an isolated villa in Gambais, near Paris. The true number of Landru's victims remains unknown, as police traced correspondence with 283 women, 72 of whom were never found. He is considered one of France's most famous and notorious murderers, whose investigation and trial became a media sensation in the aftermath of World War I. His case inspired Charlie Chaplin's film Monsieur Verdoux.

Landru was arrested on 12 April 1919 at an apartment near Paris's Gare du Nord, which he shared with his 24-year-old mistress Fernande Segret. Police eventually concluded that Landru had met or been in romantic correspondence with 283 women during the First World War, meticulously categorized by their potential wealth; seventy-two were never traced. In December 1919, Landru's wife Marie-Catherine, 51, and his eldest son Maurice, 25, were arrested on suspicion of complicity in Landru's thefts from his victims. Both denied any knowledge of Landru's criminal activities. Marie-Catherine was released without charge in July 1920 for health reasons. Maurice was released on the same day because the authorities could not establish his guilt.

Landru's trial in November 1921 at Versailles garnered immense public attention, attracting celebrities like Colette and Maurice Chevalier. Although he maintained his innocence and despite the lack of bodies, he was found guilty of eleven murders by a majority verdict on 30 November 1921, largely based on his meticulous notebooks and the circumstantial evidence. He was executed by guillotine on 25 February 1922.

== Early life ==
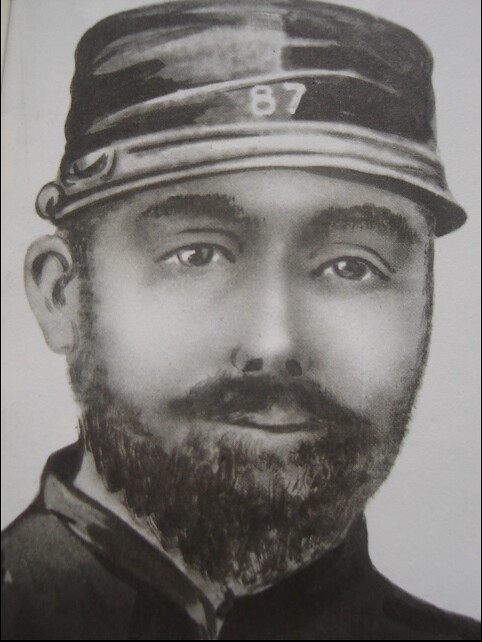
Henri Désiré Landru during his military service (circa 1889–1893)

Henri Landru was born in Paris into a modest but respectable working-class family. His father, Julien Landru, was a furnace stoker and later a factory manager, and his mother, Flore Henriquel, worked from home as a seamstress. Both were devout Catholics. Landru received his education at a Catholic school on the Île Saint-Louis, where he was described as a serious student, serving diligently as an altar boy and later as a sub-deacon. After graduating, he worked briefly in an architect's office.

At age 20, while still performing his military service, he began a relationship with his cousin, Marie-Catherine Rémy. When she became pregnant, he married her in Paris on 7 October 1893 to take responsibility and legitimize their first child, Marie, who had been born two years earlier. Landru had begun his obligatory four-year military service in 1889 in Saint-Quentin, eventually rising to deputy quartermaster. After completing his service in 1894, he returned to Paris. The couple went on to have three more children: Maurice (b. 1894), Suzanne (b. 1896), and Charles (b. 1900).

During the 1890s, Marie-Catherine worked as a laundress, while Landru struggled to hold down steady employment, working variously as an accountant, furniture salesman, mapmaker, and assistant toymaker. She later described him as a "model husband" in the early years, despite also telling police he was a "skirt chaser" from the outset. Some accounts suggest his turn to crime began after an employer at an architectural firm where Landru and colleagues had pooled savings allegedly embezzled the funds and fled to America; Landru, wanting to recover his lost funds, supposedly turned to fraud. Biographer Dennis Bardens disputed this, arguing Landru likely had few savings and may have defaulted on a loan from the employer instead.

== Criminal career ==
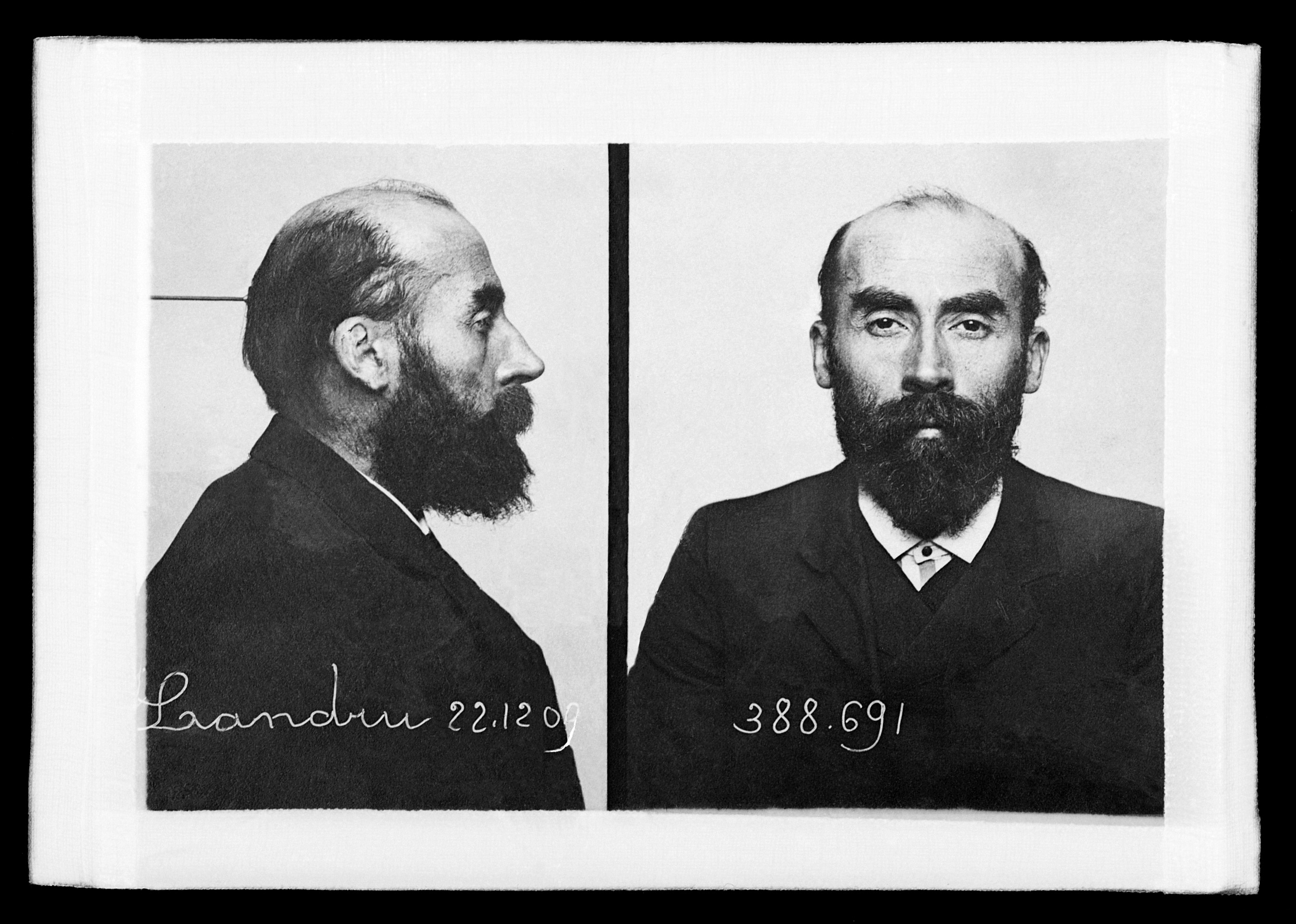
Landru Police Mugshot 22 December 1909

Landru's descent into serious crime coincided with his ambition to become an inventor. In 1898, he designed a primitive motorbike, "The Landru," then defrauded investors for a non-existent factory. He pursued other unsuccessful ventures, including a plan for a suburban railway and an automated toy. Increasingly, he resorted to fraud, spending years on the run and seeing little of his family.

His first known conviction was for fraud on 21 July 1904, resulting in a two-year sentence served in Fresnes prison, after he was arrested following an attempted bank fraud and a suspicious, possibly feigned suicide attempt while in custody at La Santé Prison. Dr. Charles Vallon, a prominent criminal psychiatrist who examined him then, concluded Landru was "on the frontiers of madness" but legally sane and responsible for his actions, though he warned Marie-Catherine about his potential danger.

Between 1902 and 1914, Landru cycled in and out of prison for various minor frauds. In 1909, he attempted to swindle a wealthy widow in Lille, posing as a single businessman. He persuaded her to hand over her savings (reported as 20,000 francs in one account) but was caught trying to cash her investment certificates and sentenced to three years in Loos prison. Some speculate this experience led him to realize that eliminating victims would prevent prosecution, as he allegedly learned the lesson "no body, no crime." While he was imprisoned, his mother died in 1909. In April 1912, shortly after Landru's release, his father, Julien, hanged himself from a tree in the Bois de Boulogne, apparently out of shame and despair over his son's criminal life. Marie-Catherine later claimed Landru stole the 12,000 francs Julien had specifically left for her and the children.

In the winter of 1913–14, Landru conducted his most successful pre-war fraud, collecting 35,600 francs from multiple investors for another fictitious automobile factory. He fled with this money and much of his inheritance just before police arrived to arrest him in April 1914. In late July 1914, he was tried in absentia, convicted for his sixth time, and sentenced to four years' hard labour followed by lifelong deportation to New Caledonia. By using various aliases and constantly moving, Landru evaded this sentence and remained a fugitive as World War I began.

== Murders (1915–1919) ==
The outbreak of World War I in August 1914 created a grim opportunity. With hundreds of thousands of Frenchmen mobilized or killed, newspapers filled with lonely hearts advertisements from war widows seeking companionship and security. Landru, exempt from service due to his age and dependents (and possibly his fugitive status), realized the appeal a seemingly stable man would hold. He began placing his own ads in major newspapers like Le Journal, presenting himself as a respectable widower: "Widower with two children, aged 43, comfortable income, affectionate, serious, and moving in good society, desires to meet widow with a view to matrimony" or "Serious gentleman seeks widow aged 35 to 45, or woman unlucky in love."

He received a flood of replies, often expressing hardship and loneliness. Landru meticulously cataloged these letters in notebooks, prioritizing correspondents based on perceived wealth. He used categories such as "Returns reply poste restante," "No money," "No reply," "Returns reply poste restante with initials," "Probably has assets," "Reserve, further investigation required," discarding those deemed "propertyless." He focused on seemingly naive women with assets, gathering further information before initiating contact.

=== Murders at Vernouillet ===
In December 1914, Landru rented the Villa Ermitage in Vernouillet, 35 kilometres (22 miles) northwest of Paris. This became the site of his first confirmed murders.

==== Jeanne and André Cuchet (late January or early February 1915) ====
Jeanne-Marie Cuchet (Note: Also spelled Jeanne KoushetSairyakkusu 1996, pp. 662–664 or Jeanne Couchet.Rēn & Gureggu 1995, p. 198) (39), an attractive Parisian lingerie seamstress widowed in 1909, had met Landru before the war, likely in 1914. He used the alias "Raymond Diard," claiming to be a postal inspector or industrialist from Lille displaced by the war. He charmed Jeanne, promising marriage and a secure future for her and her illegitimate son, André (then 16 or 17 (Note: Sources vary on André's age, stating 16Shōshin Shobō 1997, p. 2833 or 17.Monesutie 1991, pp. 99–100)), even offering to secure André a government job. Jeanne's sister and brother-in-law distrusted "Diard," sensing he was a fraud, but Jeanne dismissed their concerns.

After Landru disappeared briefly at the war's outbreak, a distraught Jeanne, accompanied by André and her brother-in-law, visited Landru's empty house near Chantilly. There, they found papers revealing his real identity (including marriage and criminal records). Despite this, and arguments over his reluctance to marry, Jeanne reconciled with Landru when he reappeared. When her family continued to warn her against Landru, she severed ties with them and, in December 1914, moved with André into Landru's rented villa in Vernouillet. André, meanwhile, was eagerly anticipating his early military recruitment.

Jeanne and André were last seen alive around 26 January 1915. Shortly after, neighbours reported thick, acrid smoke smelling of burning flesh billowing from Landru's chimney. Police who came to investigate accepted Landru's explanation that he was burning rubbish. It is almost certain he murdered and incinerated them in his stove. Landru had deposited 5,000 francs (claimed as inheritance) in June 1914, which police suspected came from Jeanne.

==== Thérèse Laborde-Line (26 June 1915) ====
Thérèse Laborde-Line (Note: Also spelled Thérèse Laporte-LineRēn & Gureggu 1995, p. 198 or Laporte-Line.Sairyakkusu 1996, pp. 662–663) (46), an Argentine-born divorced widow and former hotelier, felt estranged from her son and daughter-in-law. She met Landru in June 1915, likely through his 1 May advertisement or one she placed herself. On 21 June, telling friends she was moving to her "future husband's house," she sold her furniture. She was seen gardening at the Vernouillet villa but disappeared after 26 June 1915. Landru subsequently sold her securities and stored some remaining furniture in his garage.

==== Marie-Angélique Guillin (c. 3 August 1915) ====
Marie-Angélique Guillin (51), a retired housekeeper living near Gare de Lyon, inherited 22,000 francs and responded to Landru's 1 May 1915 ad. Believing his story of being the next Consul-General to Australia needing a hostess wife, she visited his villa and returned apparently overjoyed. On 2 August, she moved from her apartment to Vernouillet. She vanished two days later, around 3 August. Landru sold her securities and, posing as her brother-in-law authorized to act for her due to paralysis, withdrew 12,000 francs from her bank account. Starting in August, a trunk was left abandoned at a local train station. Months later, in February 1916, station staff noticed a foul odor; the trunk contained the badly decomposed, dismembered remains of an unidentified middle-aged woman.

Victims associated with Vernouillet
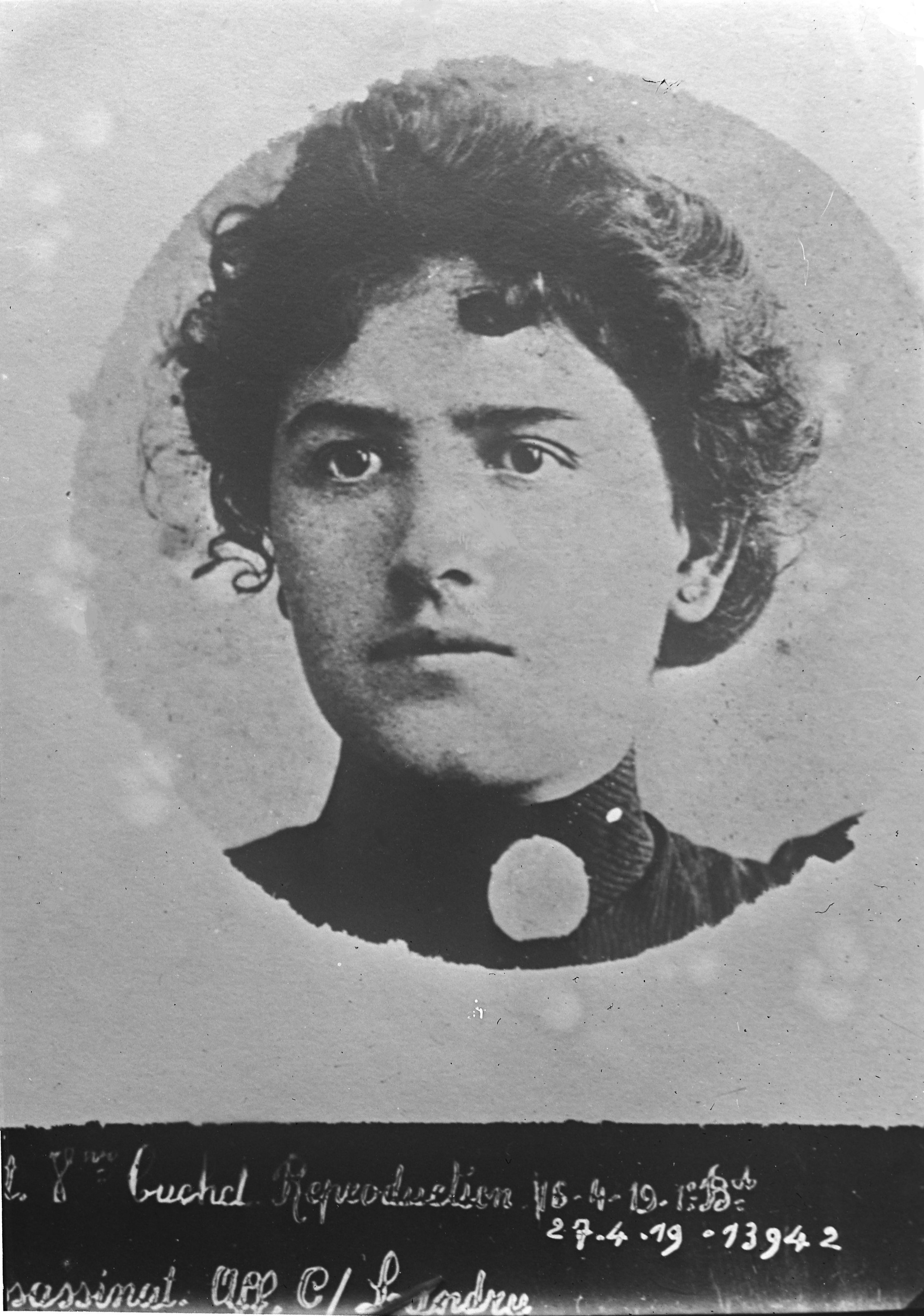
Jeanne Cuchet

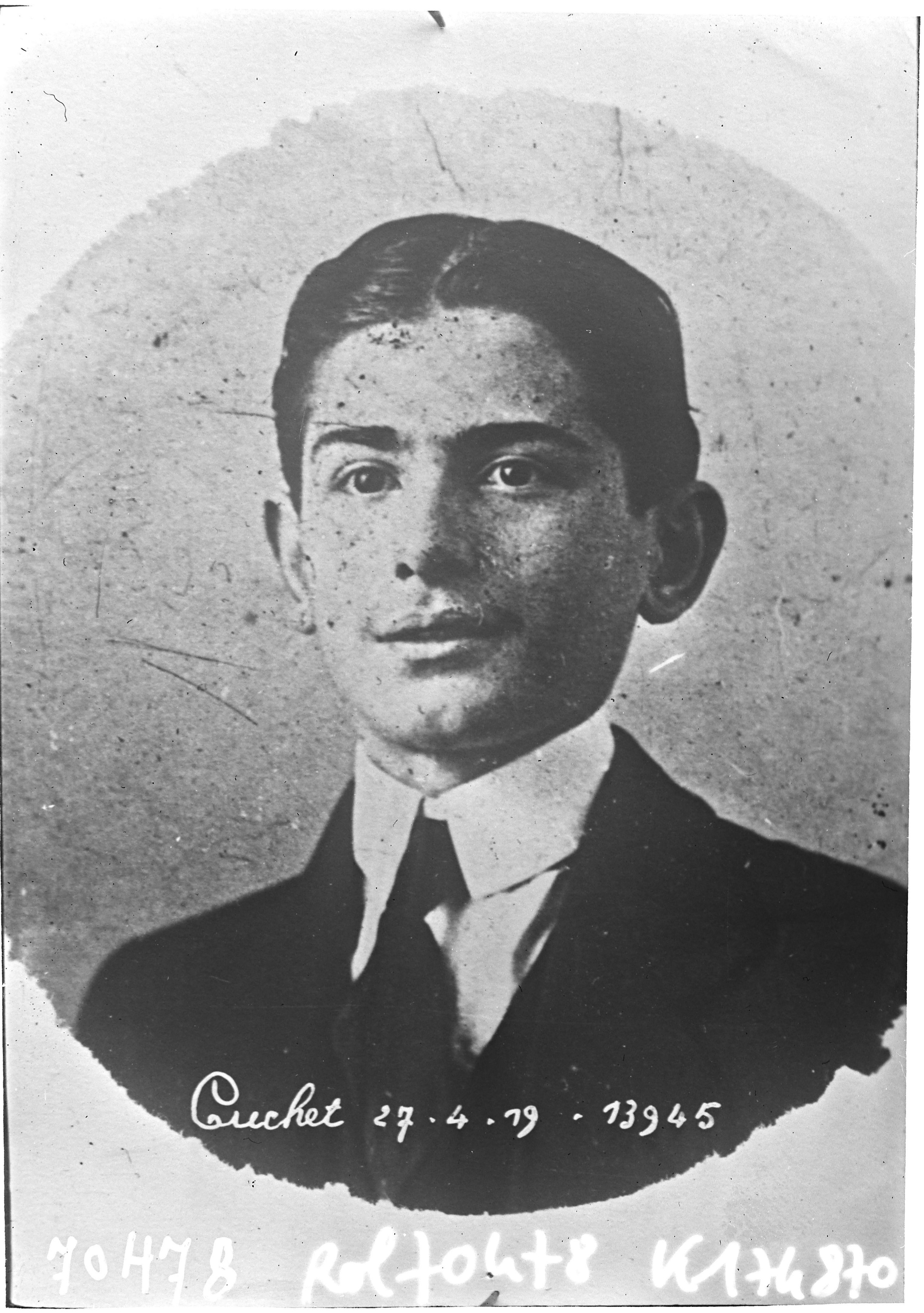
André Cuchet

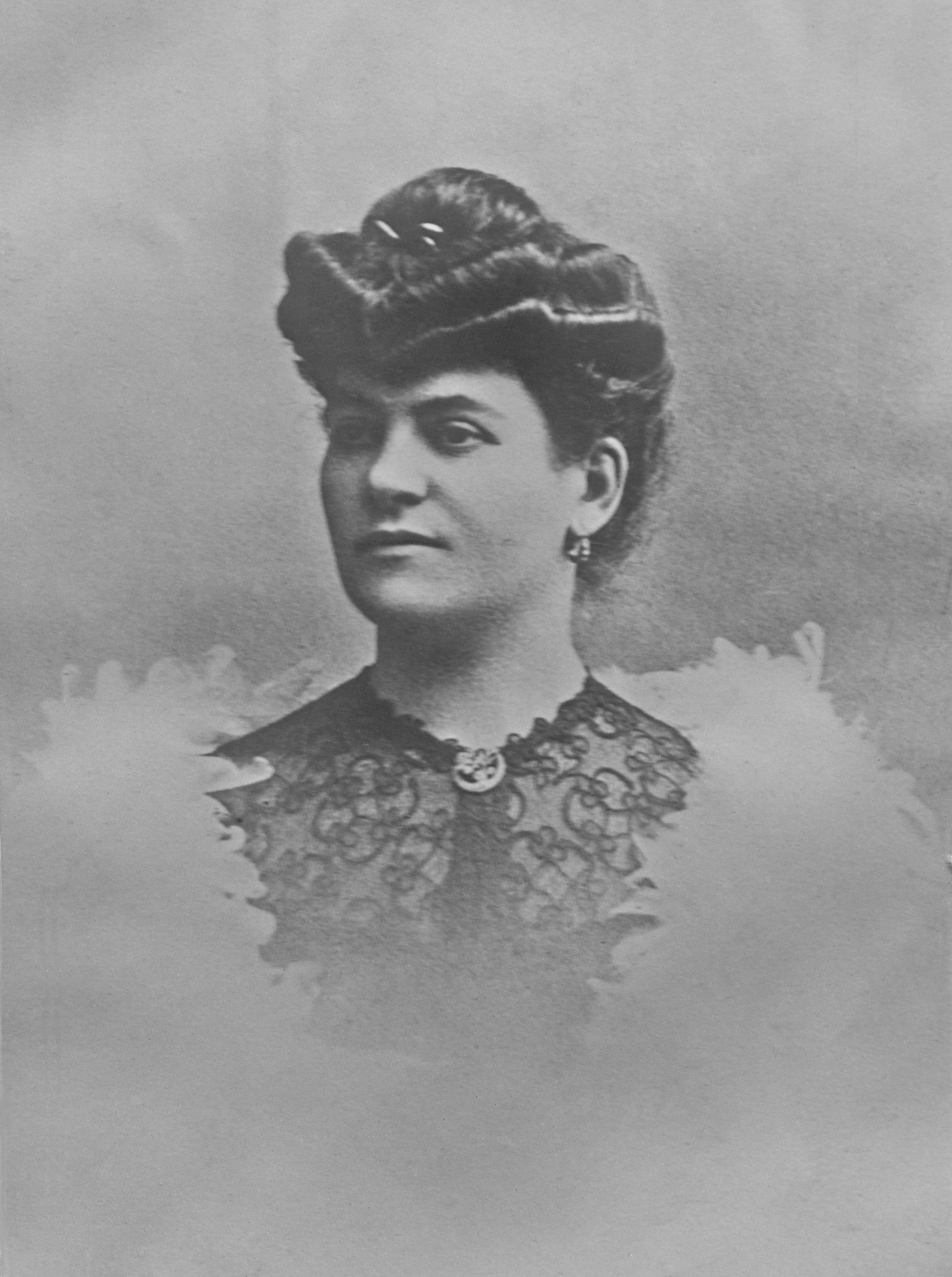
Thérèse Laborde-Line

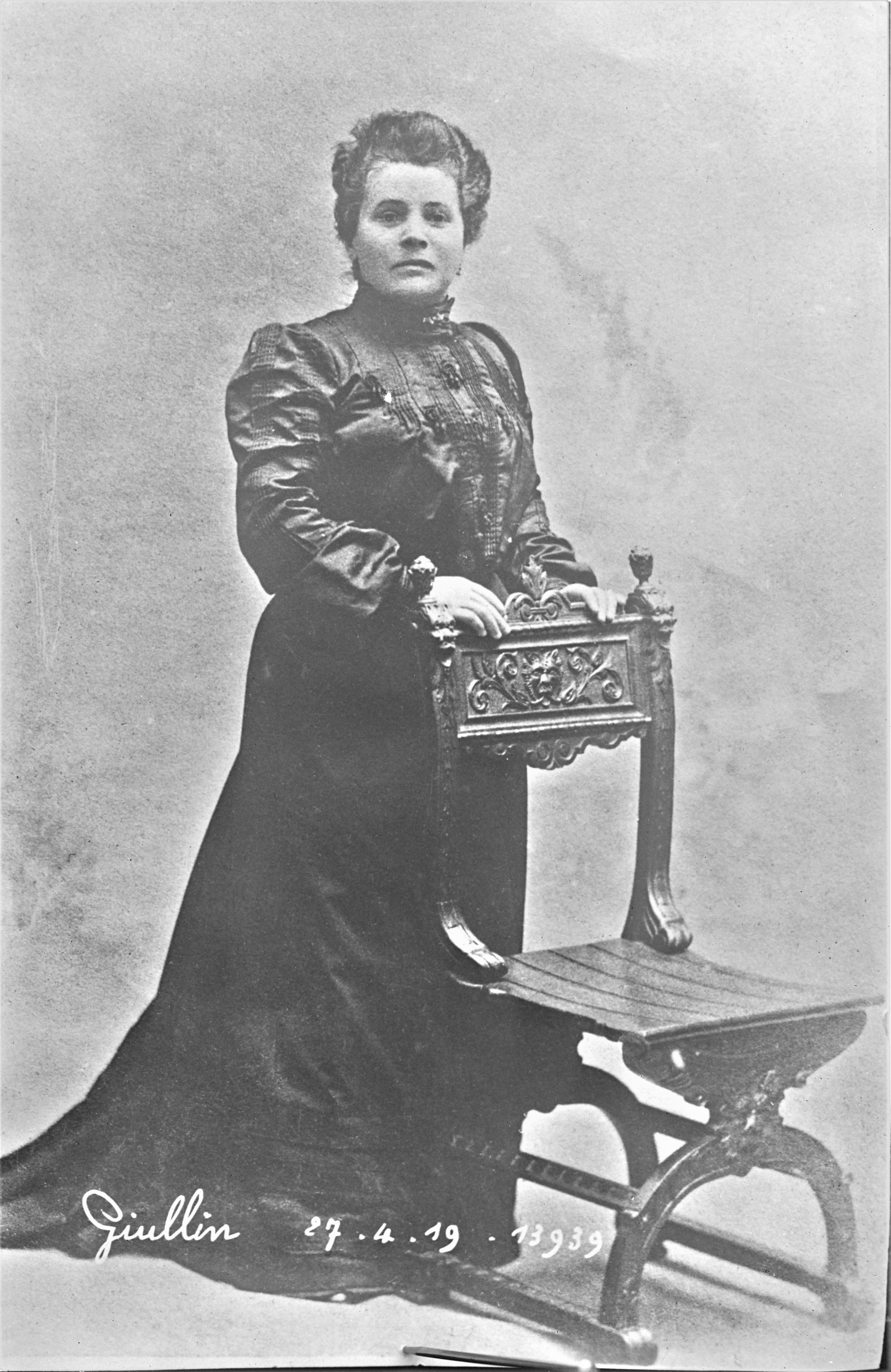
Marie-Angélique Guillin

=== Murders at Gambais ===
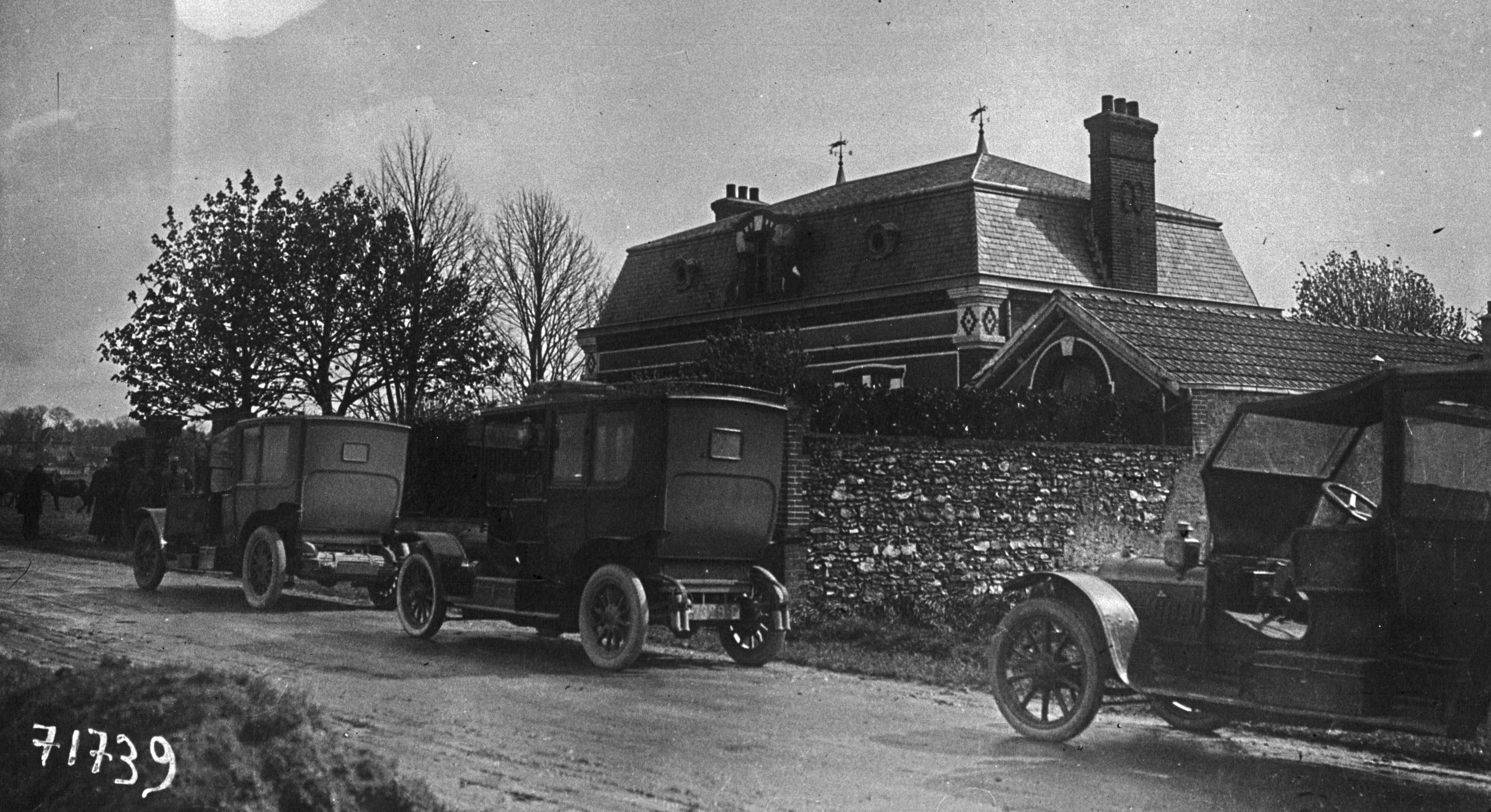
Villa Tric ("L'Ermitage") in Gambais

By late 1915, neighbours in Vernouillet were suspicious. Feeling exposed, Landru sought greater seclusion. In December 1915, he rented the isolated Villa Tric, nicknamed "L'Ermitage" ('The Hermitage'), in the village of Gambais, south of Paris. Situated 300 metres (980 feet) from the nearest house, it offered privacy. Upon moving in, Landru promptly purchased a large kitchen oven (Note: Some Japanese sources refer to the appliance as a "stove" (ストーブ).Wiruson & Pittoman 1963, p. 143) and a large quantity of coal.

==== Berthe Héon (December 1915 or January 1916) ====
Berthe-Anna Héon (55 (Note: Sources vary, stating 54Rēn & Gureggu 1995, p. 198 or 55.Shōshin Shobō 1997, p. 2833)), a widow originally from Le Havre working as a cleaner near Paris, had endured significant personal losses, including her husband, lover, son in the war, and daughter. She responded to Landru's second lonely hearts ad in summer 1915. Landru, posing as a businessman seeking a wife for a move to Tunisia, convinced her to sell her belongings. On 8 December 1915, Landru purchased train tickets to Gambais: a return for himself, a single for her. Héon vanished soon after, presumed killed and incinerated in the new oven. Landru later sent postcards to her friends, claiming to write on her behalf as she could not.

==== Anna Collomb (27 December 1916) ====
Anna Collomb (Note: Also spelled Ana CollombRēn & Gureggu 1995, p. 198 or Ana Collombe.Sairyakkusu 1996, pp. 662–664) (44 (Note: Sources vary, stating 44Shōshin Shobō 1997, pp. 2812–2815 or 45.Monesutie 1991, pp. 99–100)), an intelligent, attractive widow working as an insurance company typist, had 10,000 francs saved. She had a partner but seemingly could not marry him. She answered Landru's 1 May 1915 ad (claiming to be 29), perhaps seeking a stepfather for her illegitimate young daughter reportedly placed with nuns in Italy (the child was never found). Landru delayed meeting her until 1916 due to involvement with other victims. Once they met, Collomb quickly preferred Landru to her existing partner. Her family distrusted Landru but could not deter her. Collomb's sister visited the couple at Gambais on 14 December. Anna Collomb disappeared after 27 December 1916.

==== Andrée Babelay (12 April 1917) ====
Andrée-Anna Babelay (Note: Also spelled Andrée Bablay.Rēn & Gureggu 1995, p. 198) (19), described as pretty but poor, worked as a domestic servant or nanny, possibly supplementing her income with casual prostitution. Landru encountered her crying on a Paris Métro platform in early 1917 after she ran away from home following a quarrel with her mother. He invited her to his rented room near Gare du Nord, where they lived for ten days. On 11 March, she visited her mother, announcing she was getting married. On 29 March, Landru took her to Gambais (again, return ticket for him, single for her). She stayed for two weeks, seen learning to ride a bicycle by a game warden. Babelay disappeared after 12 April 1917. Prosecutors suggested she was killed either because she witnessed something incriminating or because Landru, initially attracted by her youth, simply tired of her.

==== Célestine Buisson (c. 1 September 1917) ====
Célestine Buisson (Note: Also spelled Célestine BuissonRēn & Gureggu 1995, p. 198 or Buisson.Monesutie 1991, pp. 99–100Wiruson & Pittoman 1963, p. 145) (47, though reported as 44 in one source), a homely, trusting, semi-literate, and reportedly frugal widowed housekeeper, had around 10,000 francs saved from her late husband's hotel business. Lonely after her illegitimate son was mobilized, she answered Landru's 1 May 1915 advertisement. Landru (as "Georges Frémyet") corresponded sympathetically, became "engaged" quickly, but then stalled the marriage for over two years, blaming lost documents and fabricated business trips abroad. He reappeared in July 1917. They grew closer after he assisted with her sister's funeral, and he proposed again. (Note: One theory suggests the delay was due to Buisson's reserved nature.Monesutie 1991, pp. 99–100) Her family found "Frémyet" evasive and suspicious but could not sway Célestine. Entrusting her son to her half-sister, Marie Lacoste, Buisson moved to Paris with Landru. On 19 August, Landru bought the familiar one return, one single ticket pattern for Gambais. She disappeared after 1 September 1917. Landru's bank balance soon increased by 1,000 francs. He later returned to her apartment, showed the concierge a forged authorization letter, claimed Buisson was running a canteen for US troops in the south, and aggressively removed and sold her furniture.

==== Louise Jaume (c. 26 November 1917) ====
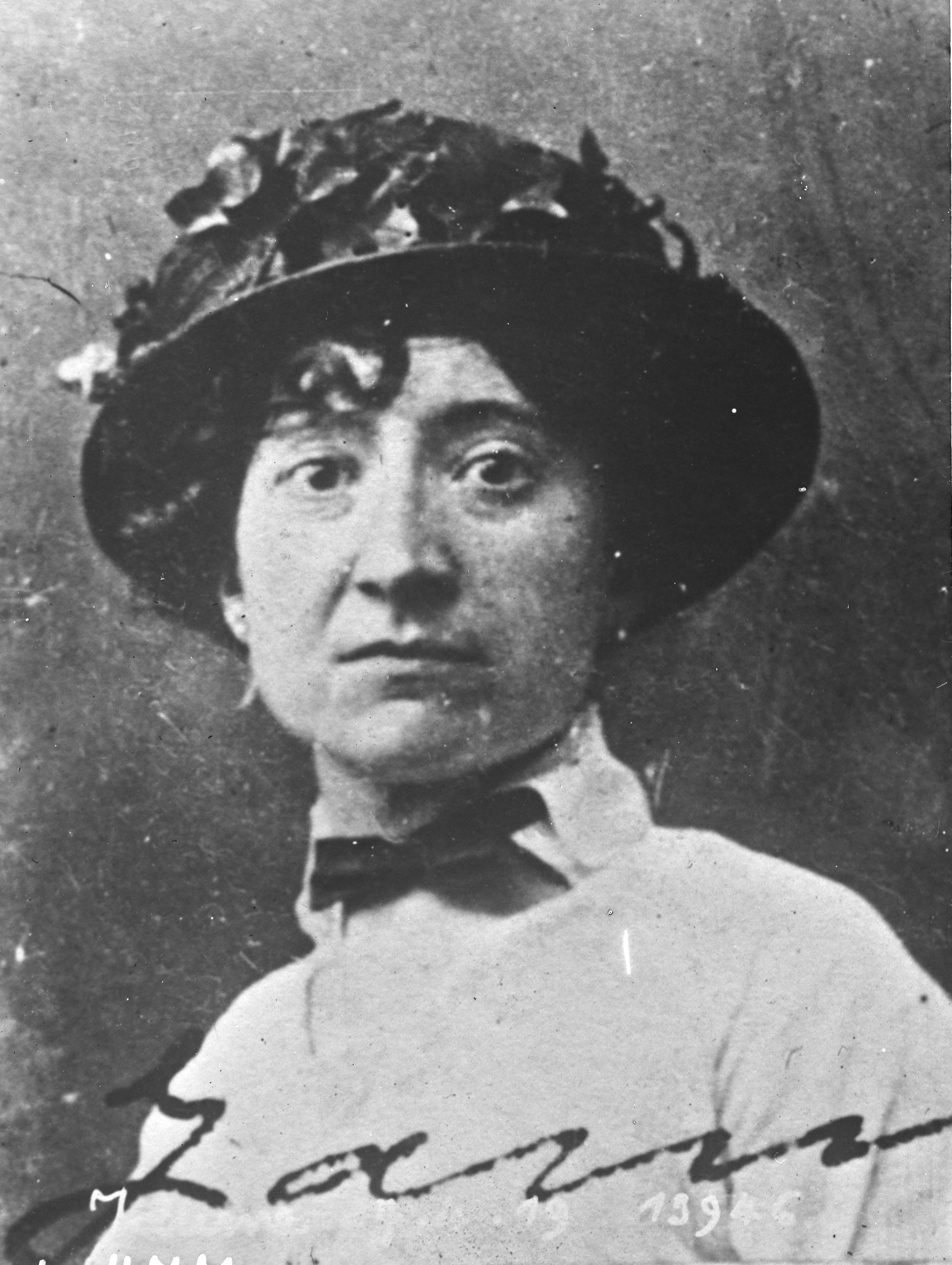
Louise Léopoldine Jaume

Louise-Joséphine Jaume (Note: Also spelled Louise Joumet.Rēn & Gureggu 1995, p. 198) (38), a devout Catholic dress shop assistant, was recently divorced. She met Landru (as "Lucien Guillet", a supposed refugee from the Ardennes) through a marriage bureau in summer 1917. She initially resisted his advances due to her faith but eventually accepted his proposal after attending Mass with him at Sacré-Cœur. Landru took her to Gambais on 15 November 1917, with a single ticket. She disappeared around 24 or 26 November 1917. Landru stole 275 francs from her and withdrew 1,400 francs from her bank account on 30 November.

==== Anne-Marie Pascal (5 April 1918) ====
Anne-Marie ('Annette') Pascal (Note: Also spelled Ann Marie Pascal.Rēn & Gureggu 1995, p. 198) (36), also divorced, worked as a dressmaker near Père Lachaise Cemetery and possibly engaged in prostitution. Nicknamed "Mme Sombrero" for her hats, she sought a "sugar daddy" and responded to Landru's ad in La Presse in September 1916. She became his mistress. Uniquely, she expressed fear of Landru, writing to her aunt days before disappearing: "I don't know who he is, but I'm scared. When he looks at me with those eyes, it chills me. There's something demonic about him." On 5 April 1918, Landru took her to Gambais (single ticket); she vanished. Landru and his son Charles later sold her furniture.

==== Marie-Thérèse Marchadier (13 January 1919) ====
Marie-Thérèse Marchadier (Note: Also spelled Marchandier.Monesutie 1991, pp. 99–100) (37, though reported as 36 in one source), originally from Bordeaux, ran a small boarding house on Rue Saint-Jacques, Paris, and engaged in prostitution. She was known for walking her two beloved Belgian Griffon dogs. Heavily indebted, she contacted Landru (under an alias) in late 1918, possibly after seeing an ad offering to buy furniture, or perhaps having met him years earlier. Landru, needing cash himself, borrowed from his wife to potentially buy Marchadier's property. He proposed marriage; she replied her only wish was to live in the country. He took her to Gambais on 9 January 1919. Despite her strong will, she agreed to cohabit and sell her furniture, receiving 2,000 francs after returning briefly to Paris. On 13 January 1919, Landru escorted her back to Gambais, reportedly carrying two bags of coal. She disappeared that day. On 16 January, neighbours reported nauseatingly foul smoke pouring from the villa's chimney.

Victims associated with Gambais
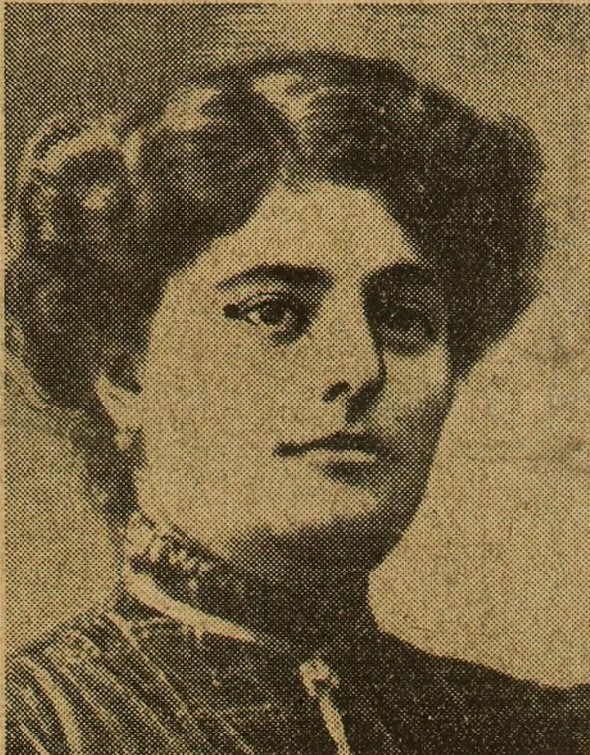
Berthe Héon

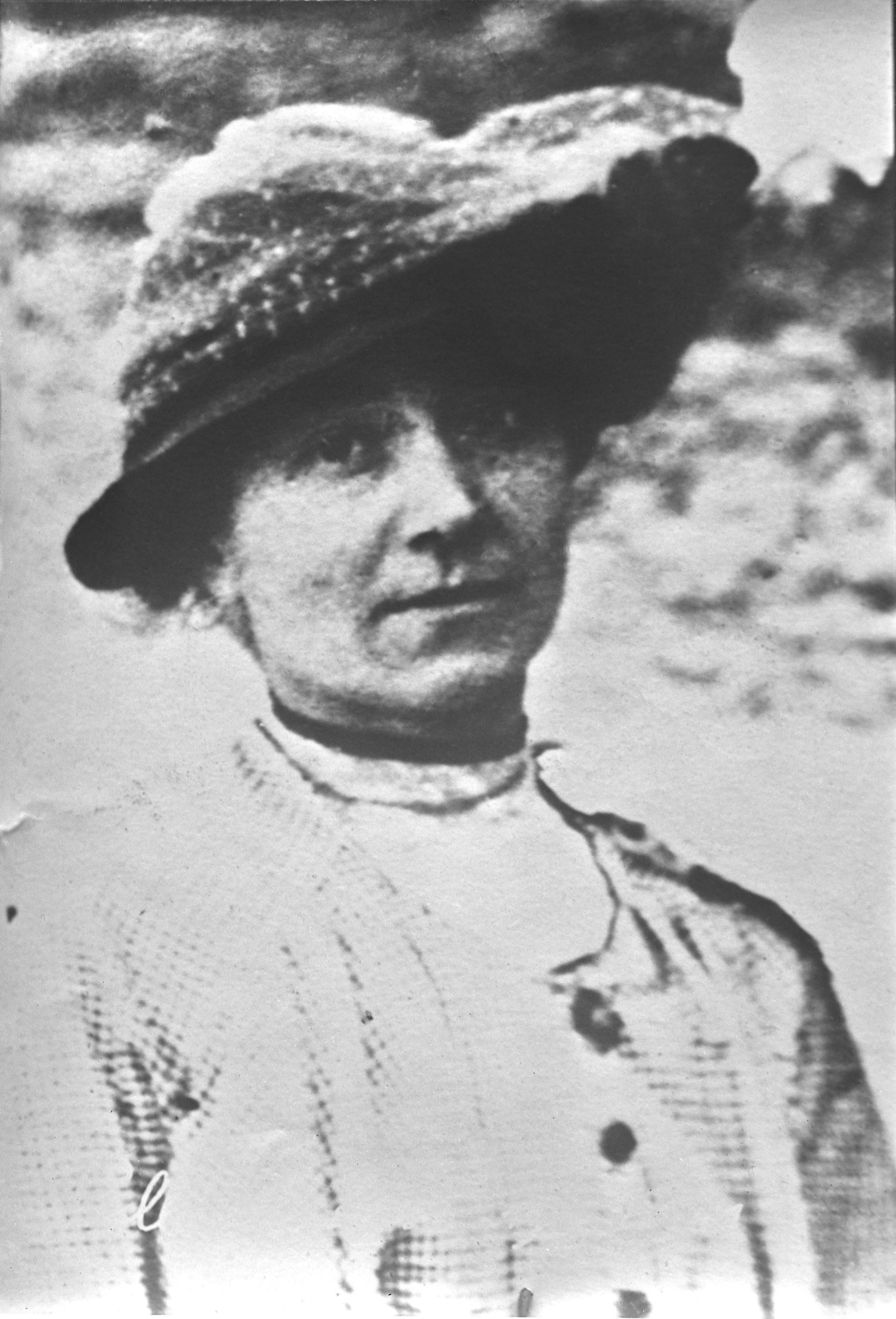
Anna Collomb

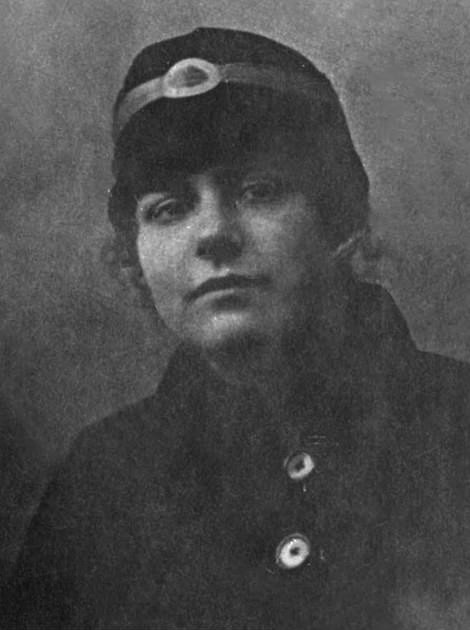
Andrée Babelay

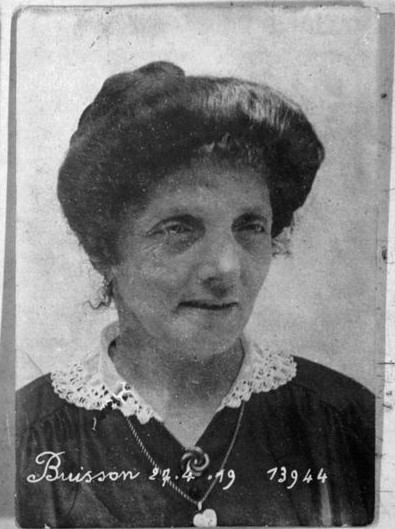
Célestine Buisson

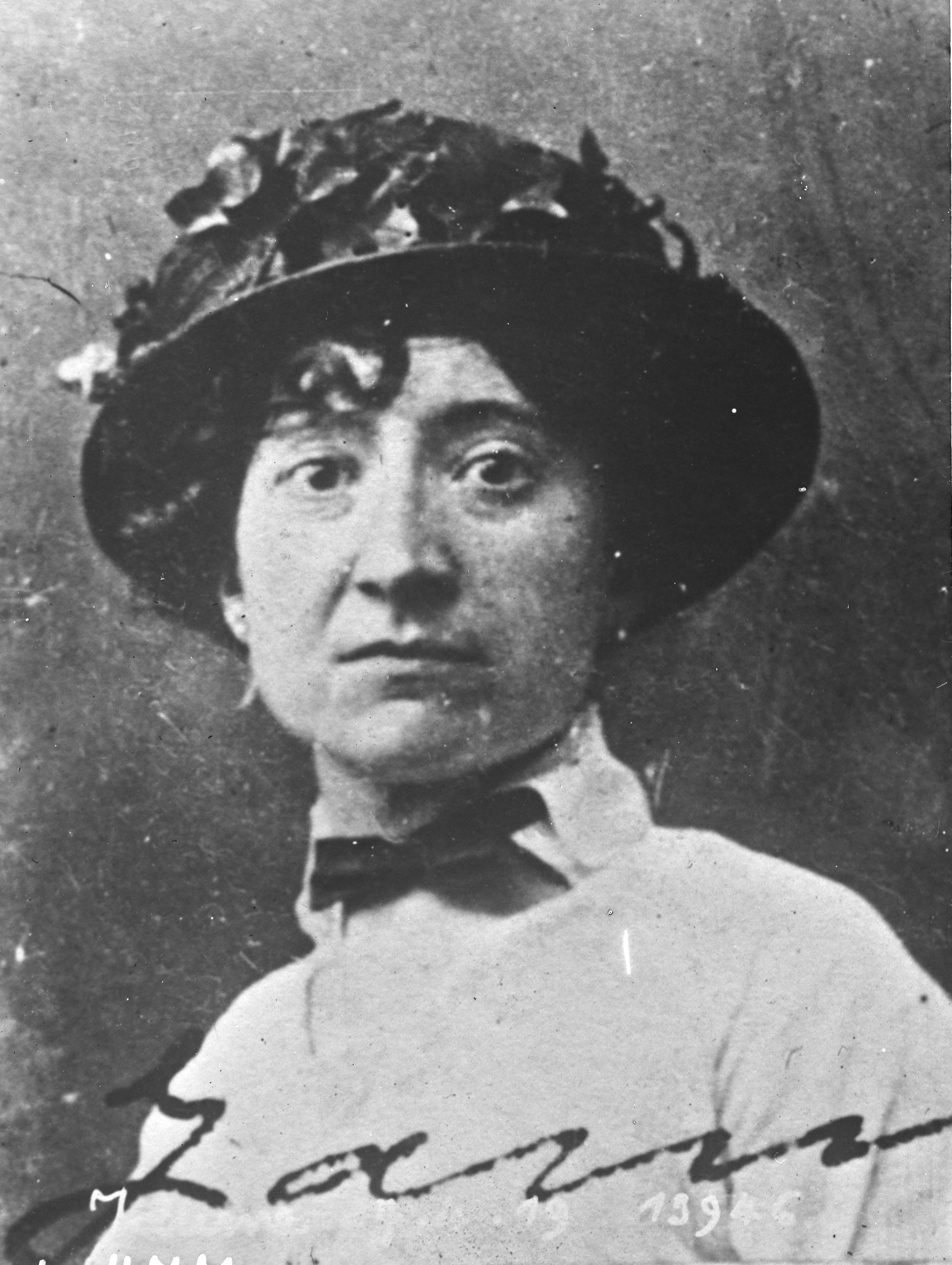
Louise Jaume

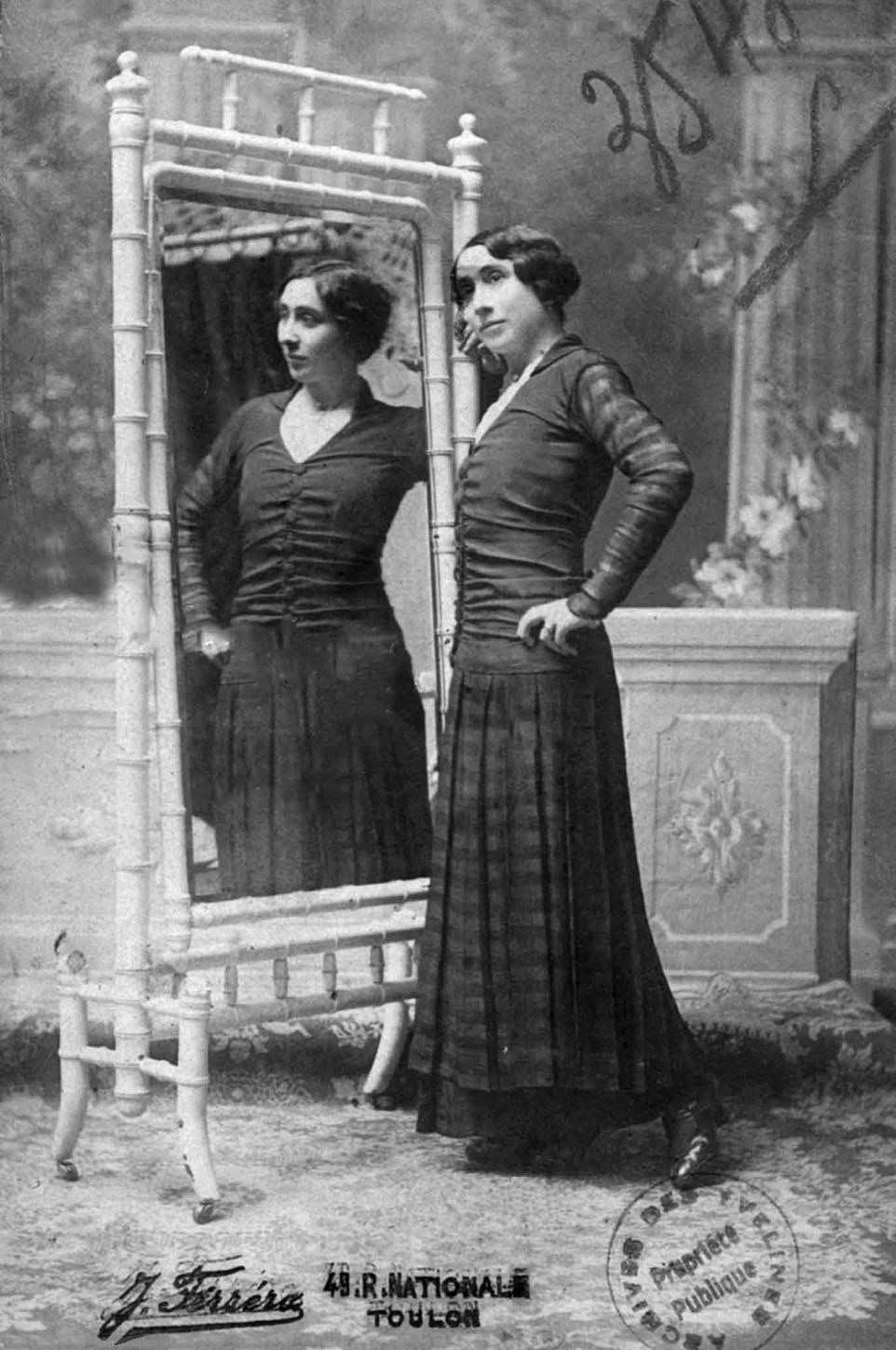
Anne-Marie Pascal

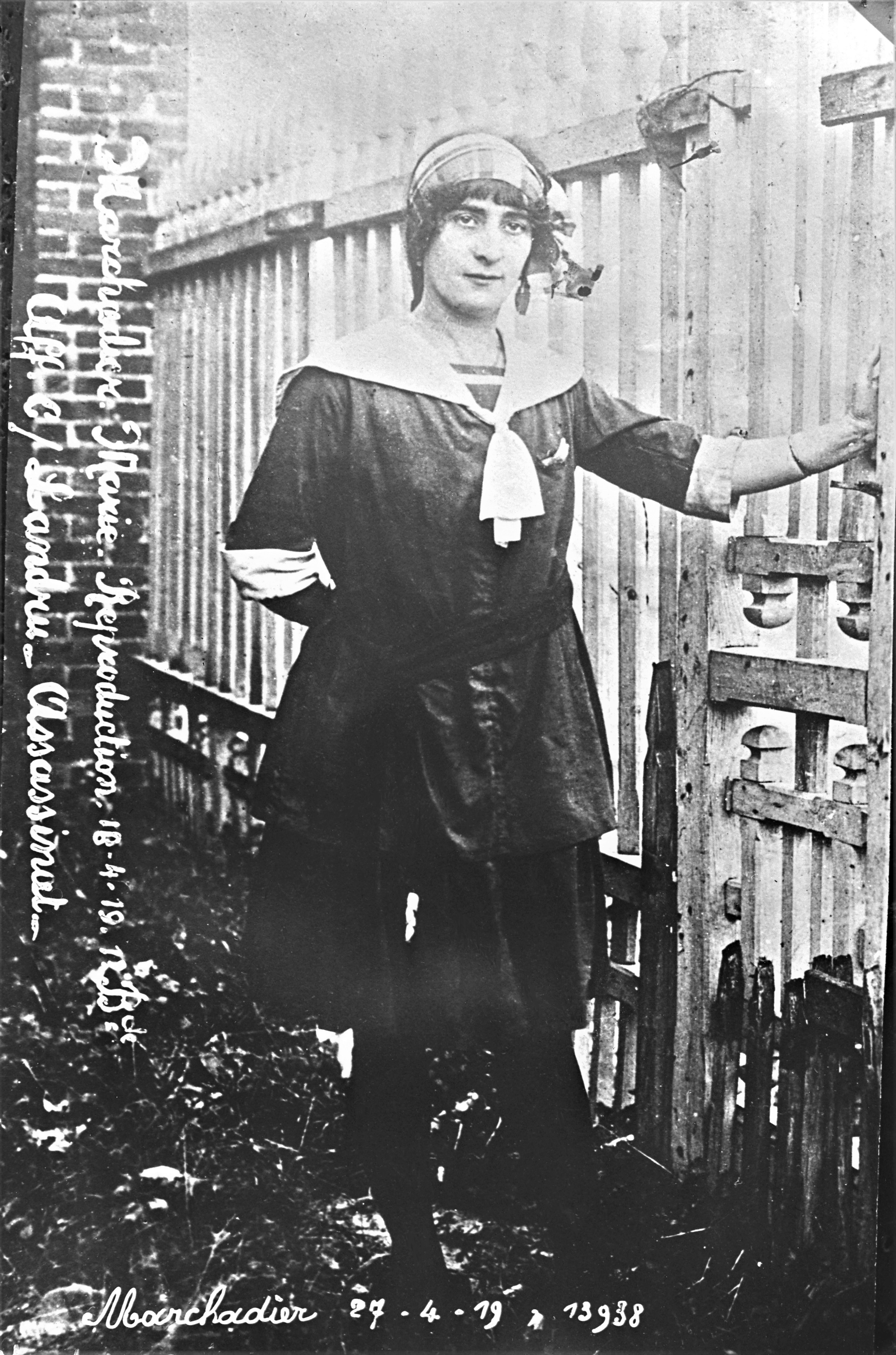
Marie-Thérèse Marchadier

=== Pursuit and arrest ===
The key to Landru's downfall was the persistence of the victims' families, particularly Marie Lacoste (sister of Célestine Buisson) and Victorine Pellat (sister of Anna Collomb). After receiving no reply to letters sent to Buisson at Gambais regarding her blinded son, Lacoste contacted the mayor of Gambais in January 1919. The mayor, initially unhelpful, eventually put her in touch with Pellat, who had made similar inquiries about Anna Collomb earlier. The two women compared notes, realized the man described (using aliases like "Frémyet" and "Dupont") was the same person, and filed missing persons reports with the prosecutor for Seine-et-Oise.

Their complaints eventually reached Inspector Jules Belin of the Paris brigade mobile. While Belin later took credit, the crucial break came on 11 April 1919. Lacoste's friend, Laure Bonhoure, who had previously seen Landru, recognized him shopping on the Rue de Rivoli with a young woman (Fernande Segret). Bonhoure alerted Lacoste, who phoned Belin. The inspector obtained the business card Landru (using the alias "Lucien Guillet") had left at the shop, revealing his address: 76 Rue de Rochechouart, near Gare du Nord.

After obtaining the correct warrant, Belin and two officers arrested Landru at his apartment around midday on 12 April 1919. As he was led away, Landru reportedly sang an aria from Massenet's opera Manon to Fernande Segret.

== Investigation (April 1919 – November 1921) ==
Landru remained defiant throughout interrogations, refusing to confirm his identity initially and repeatedly protesting his innocence. He admitted to being Landru and using aliases because he was a wanted fugitive but insisted this did not make him a murderer: "Just because I am Landru doesn't prove I am a murderer." When questioned about the women's whereabouts, he famously retorted, "That's my affair. You do your job, I'll do mine," and invoked his right to silence: "That is my secret. French law recognizes the right to remain silent."

Police searches uncovered overwhelming evidence of fraud: victims' clothing, furniture stored in garages, and crucial documents including identity papers (birth and marriage certificates) and bank details for Collomb and Buisson. Most damning was Landru's black notebook (carnet) containing detailed financial accounts, records of meetings with 283 women contacted through ads and agencies, and the list of the eleven presumed victims (10 women and André Cuchet). This notebook became the primary evidence against him. Many women in the notebook were located alive, confirming Landru's pattern of seduction and fraud; the fact that 283 women were listed became something of a running gag in France.

The search at the Gambais villa on 29 April 1919 yielded the only potential physical evidence of murder: 4.176 kg of calcined bone debris, including 295 human bone fragments, 47 small human teeth or fragments, plus scraps of cloth and buttons, found in ashes under a shed and inside the kitchen oven. Forensic analysis by Dr. Charles Paul determined the fragments came from at least three skeletons but could not confirm their sex (no pelvic bones found) or link them definitively to the known missing women. The lack of bodies remained a major hurdle for the prosecution. Landru openly mocked the police during the searches, turning up frequently and making the process a public spectacle. Excavations of the garden only unearthed the skeletons of two dogs, which Landru claimed belonged to Marchadier and he had killed and buried at her request.

The investigation also revealed the complicity of Landru's family. His youngest son, Charles, acted as his "apprentice," helping move victims' furniture and admitting to assisting with unspecified "gardening work" at Vernouillet around the time the Cuchets disappeared. His eldest son, Maurice, was caught with Jeanne Cuchet's jewellery given by Landru and later helped create a cover story for Anna Collomb's disappearance. Landru's wife, Marie-Catherine, lived under his alias "Frémyet" and admitted forging signatures for Célestine Buisson and Louise Jaume to access their bank accounts, though she denied knowing why. Although Maurice and Marie-Catherine were arrested in December 1919, they were released in July 1920 without charge, likely because proving their knowledge of the murders (beyond the thefts) would be difficult for a jury. Charles was never arrested.

== Trial (7 – 30 November 1921) ==
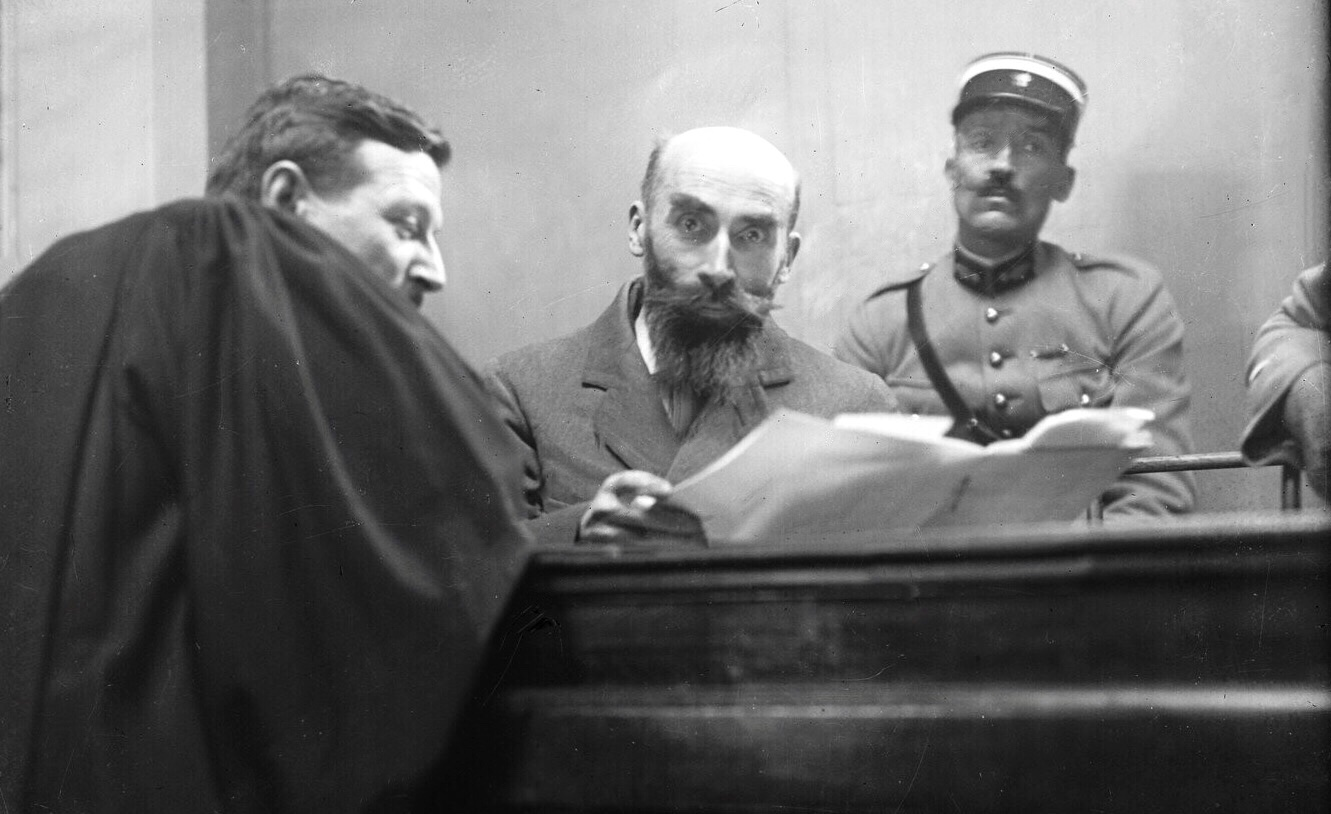
Landru and his lawyer, Vincent de Moro Giafferri, photographed during the trial

Landru's trial opened on 7 November 1921 at the Assize Court in Versailles. The event was a major public spectacle, fueled by intense press coverage possibly encouraged by the government to distract from the ongoing Paris Peace Conference.

Daily trainloads of spectators arrived from Paris on what became dubbed the "Landru Special." The courtroom overflowed with attendees (sometimes double its capacity), including celebrities like Mistinguett, Maurice Chevalier, Sacha Guitry, Rudyard Kipling, and the novelist Colette. Landru himself contributed to the circus atmosphere with his calm demeanor, witty retorts, theatrical politeness (like offering his seat to a lady), and constant denial of the murder charges, while implicitly acknowledging the frauds. He became a bizarre popular figure, receiving fan mail, gifts (sweets, tobacco), and marriage proposals. In the 1919 election, nearly 4,000 voters wrote his name on their ballots.

Despite the public conviction of his guilt, the prosecution, led by Robert Godefroy, lacked definitive proof. The bone fragments were circumstantial. Key testimony included Jeanne Cuchet's sister stating Jeanne would never abandon prized possessions found with Landru; neighbours describing the horrific smell from his chimney; and witnesses claiming they saw him dispose of items in a pond where decomposed flesh was later allegedly found. Landru, believing no bodies meant no conviction, remained evasive. His former mistress Fernande Segret also testified, adding to the drama.

Landru's renowned defence lawyer, Vincent de Moro-Giafferi, privately thought Landru guilty and possibly insane but aimed to save him from the guillotine by focusing on the lack of conclusive evidence for murder. He proposed the jury convict only on fraud, which would likely mean exile and death in French Guiana. Moro skillfully attacked the police investigation's inconsistencies and the forensic evidence's ambiguity, even suggesting the bone fragments could have been planted. He posited an alternative, albeit lurid, theory that Landru ran a "white slave" ring, sending the women abroad. In a dramatic moment, Moro announced victims had been found and would enter the court; as spectators turned to the door, he argued their reaction proved their own doubt about the murders, highlighting the lack of corpses. The prosecutor reportedly retorted that Landru himself had not turned.

Despite Moro's efforts and skilled oratory, the jury, after three hours of deliberation on 30 November 1921, found Landru guilty of all eleven murders by a 9–3 majority. They unanimously convicted him on most theft charges. Moro persuaded the jurors to sign a petition for clemency, but Landru initially refused, stating, "The tribunal has made a mistake. I have never killed anyone. This is my final protest."

== Execution and aftermath ==
Execution of Landru

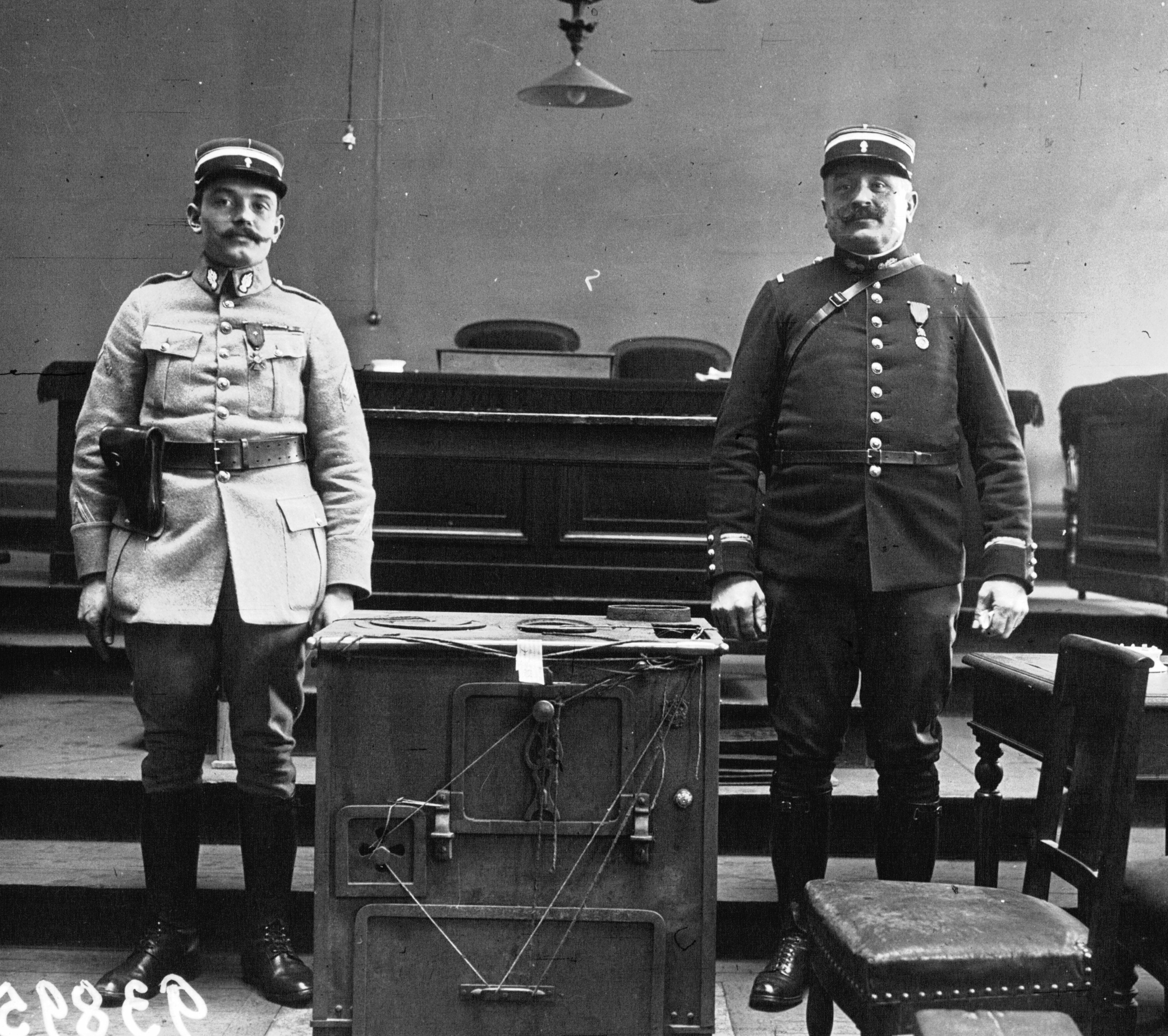
Landru's oven was an exhibit at his trial

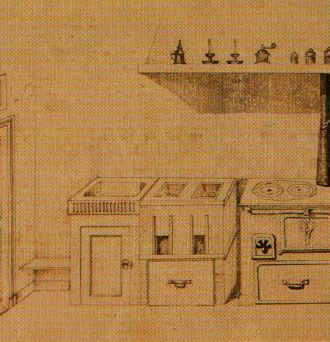
Landru's sketch of the oven

Landru eventually signed the clemency appeal, but it was rejected by President Alexandre Millerand. On 25 February 1922, shortly before dawn, he was executed by guillotine outside the gates of the Prison Saint-Pierre in Versailles. Anatole Deibler acted as executioner. Landru declined strong alcohol and refused last rites and a final confession, telling the priest to save his own soul. His final request was reportedly for a glass of rum and water, though another account mentions a foot bath. The guillotine used was ironically previously nicknamed "The Widow," prompting rumors and gossip at that time about it being the only widow Landru failed to swindle. His body was buried in the Cimetière des Gonards, later moved to an unmarked grave when the lease expired.

On the night before his execution, a large crowd gathered, some waiting through the night to witness the event, including women who reportedly rushed from Paris nightclubs still in their evening dresses. However, only officials and journalists were allowed entry. The account of one of them, Webb Miller, earned him a Pulitzer nomination, which went as follows

"Landru's bare feet made a light sound on the cold pebbles. His knees seemed not to be doing their job. His face turned red when he saw the terrifying machine, the guillotine...

The blade fell in an instant, and Landru's head fell into the basket with a dull thud. An assistant lifted the hinged board and rolled the headless torso into a wicker basket, and a sickening amount of blood gushed out... One of the assistants standing in front of the machine grabbed the basket containing the head, rolled it like a cabbage into another large basket, and quickly loaded it onto a waiting covered cart...

When Landru appeared in the prison courtyard, I checked my watch. When the cart left, I looked at my watch again, but only 26 seconds had passed."

Landru's notoriety persisted. After Landru's execution, his possessions were auctioned off as public property in accordance with the law. In 1923, enthusiasts seeking these items gathered at the Versailles courthouse. His Gambais house briefly became a morbidly themed restaurant. His possessions were auctioned in 1923; the infamous oven, believed to be the one Landru used to incinerate his victims, was initially sold to a Dutch bidder for 42,000 francs. However, when this payment was not made, it was ultimately acquired by an Italian bidder for 40,000 lire. Plans to exhibit it were blocked, and it vanished into a private collection.

In 1963, 46 years after his execution, newspapers published articles titled "Landru's Confession." According to these articles, a purported confession emerged. It was allegedly written by Landru on the back of a sketch of the oven (or a framed picture he gave to one of his lawyers while in the condemned cell). The lawyer's daughter reportedly discovered Landru's hastily written confession on the back of the picture when she removed the frame for cleaning, and it said "Things didn't happen behind the wall, rather something was burned inside the oven." The British Daily Express reported that it said "I did it. I burned the women's bodies in the kitchen oven." The British News of the World reported that it said "The trial witnesses are all brainless. I killed the women inside the house." The French newspaper France-Soir reported that it said "The witnesses are all idiots. It wasn't behind the wall that things happened, but inside the house that something burned."

British murderer John Haigh, who used acid to dispose of victims in the 1940s (specifically, killing nine people and dissolving their bodies in sulfuric acid), is sometimes said to have been inspired by Landru.

Further possible remains linked to Landru surfaced decades later. Even after Landru's death, bodies believed to be connected to him were discovered. In March 1933, in Saint-Denis, a suburb of Paris, when the house next to one Landru had lived in was demolished, a skeleton that appeared to be of a young woman was discovered under the kitchen floor. Also in 1958, when the land of Landru's residence in Gambais was excavated, partial skeletons of two individuals were found. These are speculated to be those of the first victim, Jeanne Cuchet, and her son.

A preserved head, claimed to be Landru's, is displayed at the Museum of Death in Hollywood, California.

== Personality and motives ==
Landru was described as possessing charm, sophistication, affability, an affected demeanor, and an air of respectability that attracted many women. His age and slightly paternal demeanor, even his baldness, is said by Shōshin Shobō to have appealed to vulnerable women seeking security in uncertain times.

Landru maintained a strict separation between his criminal activities and his family life. A husband and father of four, Landru led a seemingly very ordinary life with them. To his wife and children, he appeared a conventional, albeit often absent, paterfamilias, described as thoughtful and considerate. He provided gifts (bought with stolen funds, such as jewelry for his wife) and financial support, though he never revealed the illicit source of his income.

Landru's conduct during the investigation and trial cemented his public image. He remained calm, polite (consistently maintaining a refined demeanor), witty and unflappable, consistently denying the murders while implicitly admitting the frauds and often making ironic jokes. For example, when a woman who arrived late to the courtroom gallery was having trouble finding a seat, Landru reportedly offered her his own defendant's seat, saying, "If my seat is alright with you," which drew laughter from the attendees. This behavior made Landru a subject of jokes, songs, cartoons and morbid fascination. He earned nicknames like "Bluebeard" (sometimes "Old Man Bluebeard," particularly in vaudeville theaters), "The Lady Killer," and "The Red Man of Gambais." A famous cartoon depicted Landru telling his lawyer, "A woman's place is in the home (foyer)." The word "foyer" in French has the dual meaning of "home/hearth" and "furnace/stove," thus satirizing the widespread belief that Landru had incinerated his victims' bodies in his oven. This public fascination extended to enthusiastic fans sending him gifts like sweets and tobacco, and he received a deluge of marriage proposals. Furthermore, in the 1919 general election, approximately 4,000 voters reportedly wrote Landru's name on their ballots.

=== Notable quotes ===
Landru's cynicism and evasiveness were evident in his recorded statements:

- On his notebook: "The police gentlemen would have been more pleased if it had included on the first page, 'I, the undersigned, confess to having killed the ten women named herein.'"
- On the disappearances: "Is there anyone who goes missing who doesn't fall under suspicion of murder?"
- When pressed: "That's my secret. French law recognizes the right to remain silent."
- To sanity experts: "By acknowledging that I am normal, you have, so to speak, proven my innocence."
- During trial: "Believe me, please, I didn't even know how to light the oven." / "Women don't count their age from birth, but from their confirmation."
- After conviction, to his lawyer: "If I had gotten off, it would have been thanks to you." / "I've asked you to handle quite a troublesome, or rather, desperate defense. But this isn't the first time an innocent man has been punished... Of course, Counselor, I am innocent."
- To the priest before execution: "Worry about saving your own soul rather than mine."
- Final words when asked to confess: "To ask such a question at this point is extremely rude."

=== Financial motivation ===
Evidence points to greed as Landru's primary motive. His monetary desire and avarice are noted characteristics. This is evident in his meticulous categorization of potential victims. For instance, after placing advertisements seeking a spouse and receiving a large number of replies, Landru carefully sorted them, recording classifications such as "reply by general delivery," "no money," "no reply," "reply by general delivery with initials," "probably has property," and "reserve, further investigation needed." He would then reply to women who seemed to have property to gather more information, selecting those who appeared as naive as possible, and explicitly eliminated applicants he marked as "no property".

His habit of buying single train tickets for victims when taking them to Gambais, while purchasing return tickets for himself, further underscores this; he did this to save even minuscule amounts of his own money, not wanting to waste a single franc while intending to steal theirs. Furthermore, his detailed accounting of even the smallest expenses, recorded in a notebook (which was among the evidence seized during the house search after his arrest), highlights his extreme avarice. This notebook included meticulous records of items like bus and subway fares, and train fares for trips between Paris and Gambais, alongside the assets acquired from his victims.

== Historical context ==
The backdrop of World War I, both during and after the conflict, was crucial to Landru's success. The immense loss of life created a large pool of lonely, vulnerable widows desperate for security and companionship, although Anna-Berthe Heon was the only female victim of his who was a war widow.

In the era when the horror of the war was still lingering, the prevailing social trend of women seeking partners who could promise a stable future worked in his favor. Every day during the war, many soldiers were killed on the battlefield, creating a continuous stream of new widows, and newspapers carried advertisements from these women seeking companions on a daily basis. Many women, especially war widows overflowing in Paris at the time, faced uncertain futures alone and potentially lacked experience in managing finances or making major decisions without male relatives. Landru, presenting himself as a respectable man spared from the front, exploited this societal vulnerability. Despite his appearance, his skilful conversation and ability to behave in a seemingly serious manner made him appear as a trustworthy suitor.

Furthermore, wartime conditions strained police resources, diverting manpower to tracking deserters and managing wartime exigencies. After the first crime involving Jeanne Cuchet, the police were mostly occupied with tracking deserters during the war and had no capacity to investigate this case. This lack of investigation emboldened Landru, giving him "a taste" for it and leading him to continue his crimes undetected for longer.

The trial's occurrence shortly after the war's devastating conclusion also played a role. The war had killed 1.5 million French people, and the trial provided the French public with a sensational, albeit grim, distraction from national trauma and the difficult political climate surrounding the peace negotiations. For ordinary citizens, Landru's trial was a rare opportunity for a change of pace or mood.

== In fiction ==
- Charlie Chaplin's dark comedy Monsieur Verdoux (1947) is the most famous work inspired by Landru. Chaplin adapted an Orson Welles script, portraying a man who turns to murdering wealthy women to support his family after losing his job.
- Claude Chabrol directed the French film Landru (1963), scripted by Françoise Sagan. It presented a blackly comedic version of the case, focusing on the later murders and portraying them as more glamorous. Landru's former mistress, Fernande Segret, successfully sued for filmmakers for misrepresentation and won damages. The renewed public attention reportedly contributed to her suicide in 1968; her suicide note allegedly read, "I still love him, but I cannot bear this suffering. I have decided to take my own life."
- H. P. Lovecraft's story The Horror in the Museum (written with Hazel Heald) features a lifelike wax figure of Landru in a private museum of horrors.
- Landru appears as one of the murderous wax figures brought to life in the 1963 The Twilight Zone episode "The New Exhibit", portrayed by Milton Parsons.
- A forensics file box labeled "1919, Medico-Légale, Landru" appears in season 1, episode 1 of the Franco-Belgian detective television series Astrid et Raphaëlle (2019).

== See also ==
- List of serial killers nicknamed "Bluebeard"
- List of French serial killers
- Murder conviction without a body
- Capital punishment in France

== Bibliography ==
=== English ===
- Bardens, Dennis, The Ladykiller: The Crimes of Landru, the French Bluebeard, P. Davies, London, 1972.
- Cyriax, Oliver; Wilson, Colin; Wilson, Damon (2005) [1993]. "Landru, Henri Désiré". The Encyclopedia of Crime. Andre Deutsch. pp. 254–255. ISBN 9780233001449.
- Le Queux, William, Landru: His Secret Love Affairs, Stanley Paul & Co., London, 1922.
- Mackenzie, F.A. (editor), Landru, Geoffrey Bles, London, 1928.
- Tomlinson, Richard, Landru's Secret: The Deadly Seductions of France's Lonely Hearts Serial Killer, Pen & Sword, Yorkshire and Philadelphia, 2018. ISBN 978-1-52671-529-6
- Wakefield, Herbert Russell, Landru, The French Bluebeard, Duckworth, London, 1936.

=== French ===
- Belin, J., Commissaire Belin. Trente Ans de Sûreté Nationale, Bibliothèque FranceSoir, Paris, 1950.
- Béraud, Henri, Bourcier, Emmanuel & Salmon, André, L'Affaire Landru, Albin Michel, Paris, 1924.
- Bernède, Arthur, Landru, Jules Tallandier, Paris, 1931.
- Biagi-Chai, Francesca, Le cas Landru à la lumière de la psychoanalyse, Imago, Paris, 2007.
- Darmon, Pierre, Landru, Plon, Paris, 1994.
- J.H.H. Gaujot; Robin Odell (30 June 1986) [1980]. Les Grands Criminels [Murderers' Who's Who / 殺人紳士録] (in French). Translated by Kawaii Shūji. Éditions Denoël (French ed.) / Yayoi Shobō (Japanese ed.).
- González, Christian, Monsieur Landru, Scènes de Crimes, Paris, 2007.
- Jaeger, Gérard, Landru: bourreau des cœurs, L'Archipel, Paris, 2005.
- Lanzalavi, Dominique, Vincent de Moro Giafferri: Défendre l'homme, toujours, Ajaccio, Albiana, 2011.
- Masson, René, Landru, le Barbe-Bleue de Gambais, N'Avouez Jamais, Paris, 1974.
- Michal, Bernard, Les Monstres, Bibliomnibus, Paris, 2014.
- Alain Monestier (1 April 1991) [1988]. Les Grandes Affaires Criminelles [World Criminals / 世界犯罪者列伝 悪のスーパースターたち] (in French). Translated by Takahashi Kei. Bordas (French ed.) / JICC Shuppankyoku (Japanese ed.). ISBN 978-4-7966-0097-2.
- Sagnier, Christine, L'Affaire Landru, Editions de Vecchi, Paris, 1999.
- Yung, Eric, Landru: 6h 10 Temps Clair, Editions Télémaque, Paris, 2013.

=== Japanese ===
- Martin Fido (25 February 1997) [1993-10-28]. Imai Kesaharu (ed.). Sekai Hanzai Kuronikuru [The Chronicle of Crime / 世界犯罪クロニクル]. World Mook. World Photo Press. ISBN 978-4-8465-2095-3.
- Hanzai Shinri Kenkyūjo, ed. (1 May 2013). Rekishi-teki Daihanzaisha ga Nokoshita Kyōki no Kotoba 96 [96 Mad Words Left by Great Historical Criminals]. DIA Collection. Daiapuresu. ISBN 978-4-86214-699-1.
- Imidas Jōhō Chishiki 1996 [Imidas Information & Knowledge 1996]. Shueisha. 1 January 1996. ISBN 978-4-08-100010-4.
- Nihon Rōdō Kenkyū Kikō Kenkyūjo, ed. (30 March 2001). Ajia ni okeru kōsei rōdō kijun [Fair Labor Standards in Asia]. Chōsa Kenkyū Hōkokusho. Nihon Rōdō Kenkyū Kikō. p. 88. ISBN 978-4-538-89141-5. Archived from the original on 25 February 2013.
- Brian Lane; Wilfred Gregg (1 June 1995) [1979]. Renzoku Satsujin Shinshiroku [The Encyclopedia of Serial Killers / 連続殺人紳士録]. Translated by Hashimoto Megumi. Chūō Āto Shuppansha. ISBN 978-4-88639-713-3.
- Brian Lane (25 July 1996) [1991-04-18]. Shitai Shori Hō [The Body Snatchers / 死体処理法]. Translated by Tateishi Mitsuko. Futami Shobō. ISBN 978-4-576-96072-2.
- "Gendai no 'Aohige'" [The Modern 'Bluebeard']. Shūkan Mādā Kēsubukku [Weekly Murder Casebook]. 3 (16). Shōshin Shobō. 22 April 1997. ASIN B008NHTAJE.
- Colin Wilson; Patricia Pitman (15 June 1963) [1961]. Satsujin Hyakka [Encyclopedia of Murder / 殺人百科]. Translated by Ōba Tadao. Yayoi Shobō.
