= Nadine Alari =

French actress (1927–2016)

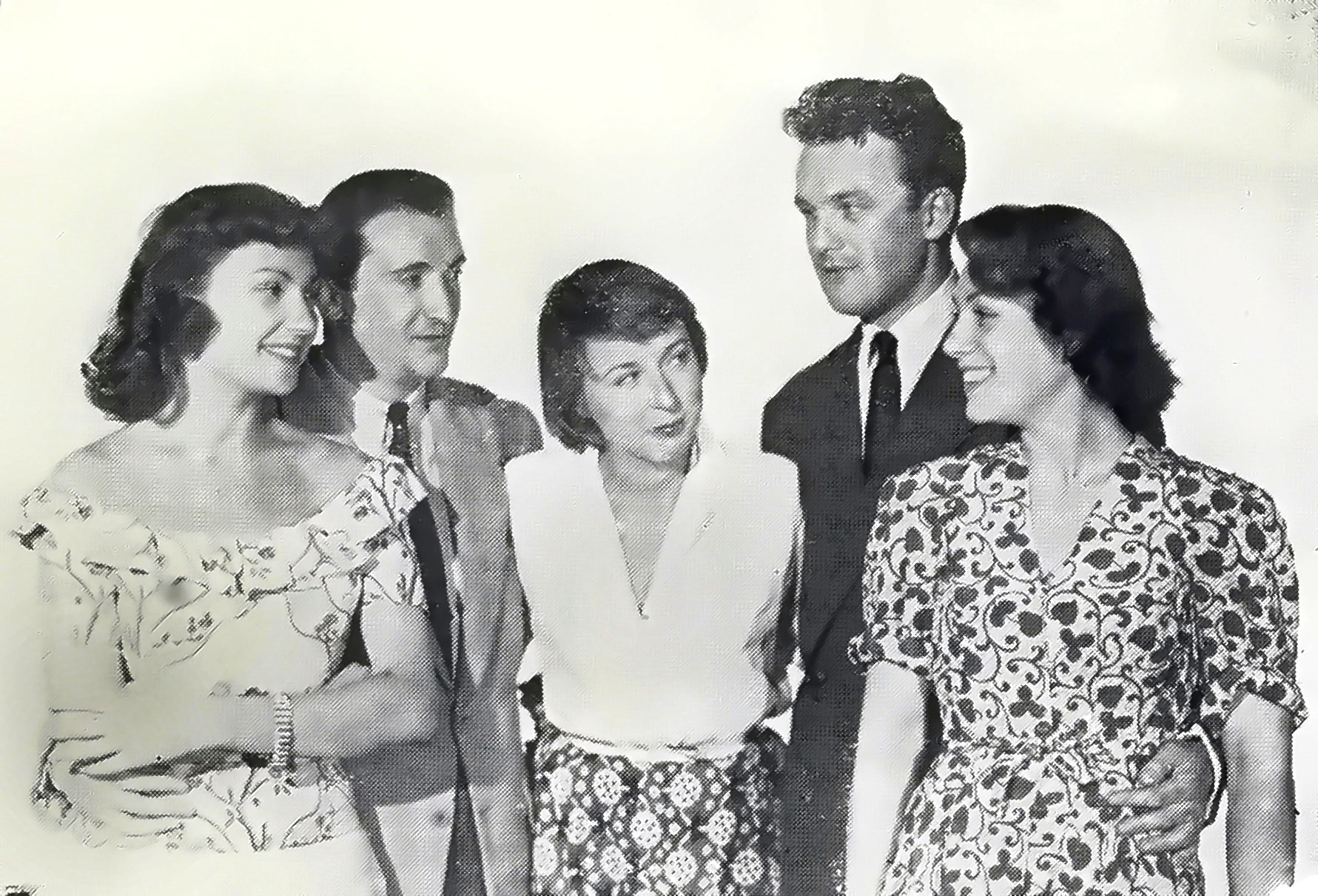
- Born: 23 February 1927; Paris, France
- Died: 24 November 2016 (aged 89)
- Other name: Bernadette Nicole Frédérique Bovarie
- Occupation: Actress
- Years active: 1946-2016

Nadine Alari (born Bernadette Nicole Frédérique Bovarie; 23 February 1927 – 24 November 2016) was a French film and television actress.

== Selected filmography ==
- Jericho (1946)
- The Lovers of Pont Saint Jean (1947)
- Tuesday's Guest (1950)
- The Happy Man (1950)
- Great Man (1951)
- The Straw Lover (1951)
- The Turkey (1951)
- The Most Beautiful Girl in the World (1951)
- Darling Caroline (1951)
- Madame du Barry (1954)
- The Gambler (1958)
- Sun in Your Eyes (1962)
- The Sleeping Car Murders (1965)
- Lagardère (1967, TV series)
- Amour (1970)
- A Simple Story (1978)
- The Sentinel (1992)
- The Adversary (2002)

== Bibliography ==
- Ulrike Siehlohr. Heroines Without Heroes: Reconstructing Female and National Identities in European Cinema, 1945-1951. A&C Black, 2000.
