= The Happy Man =

1950 film

- Directed by: Gilles Grangier
- Written by: René Wheeler; Paul Géraldy
- Based on: L'homme de joie by Paul Géraldy and Robert Spitzer
- Produced by: Alexandre Mnouchkine
- Starring: Jean-Pierre Aumont; Simone Renant; Jacques Morel
- Cinematography: Michel Kelber
- Edited by: Jacqueline Sadoul
- Music by: René Sylviano
- Production companies: La Société des Films Sirius; Les Films Ariane
- Distributed by: La Société des Films Sirius
- Release date: 8 December 1950
- Running time: 84 minutes
- Country: France
- Language: French

The Happy Man or The Man of Joy (French: L'Homme de Joie) is a 1950 French comedy film directed by Gilles Grangier and starring Jean-Pierre Aumont, Simone Renant and Jacques Morel. It was based on a play of the same title by Paul Géraldy and Robert Spitzer. The film's sets were designed by the art director Guy de Gastyne.

== Synopsis ==
A married woman is shocked to discover that her husband is having a romantic flirtation with an actress. She engages a charming young man known as the "man of the joy" to draw the actress' attention away from her husband.

== Cast ==
- Jean-Pierre Aumont as Henri Perlis
- Simone Renant as Madeleine Jolivet
- Jacques Morel as Edouard Jolivet
- Lysiane Rey as Margot Baron
- Nadine Alari as Mireille Dalier
- Jacqueline Noëlle as Evelyne
- Henri Crémieux as M. Jolivet père
- Anita Palacine as Lisa

== Bibliography ==
- Goble, Alan. The Complete Index to Literary Sources in Film. Walter de Gruyter, 1999.
- Rège, Philippe. Encyclopedia of French Film Directors, Volume 1. Scarecrow Press, 2009.
