= The Legend of Frenchie King =

- French theatrical release poster
- Directed by: Christian-Jaque
- Screenplay by: Guy Casaril; Clement Biddle Wood; Daniel Boulanger
- Dialogue by: Daniel Boulanger
- Story by: Marie-Ange Aniès; Jean Nemours
- Produced by: Raymond Eger; Francis Cosne
- Starring: Brigitte Bardot; Claudia Cardinale; Michael J. Pollard; Micheline Presle; Georges Beller; Henri Czarniak; Raoul Delfosse; France Dougnac; Valéry Inkijinoff; Jacques Jouanneau; Denise Provence; Patrick Préjean
- Cinematography: Henri Persin
- Edited by: Nicole Gauduchon
- Music by: Francis Lai
- Production companies: Les Films EGE; Francos Films; SNC; Vides Cinematografica; Copercines; Hemdale
- Distributed by: SNC (France); Cinema International Corporation (Italy); Chamartín (Spain); Hemdale (UK)
- Release date: 16 December 1971
- Running time: 94 minutes
- Countries: France; Italy; Spain; United Kingdom
- Language: French
- Box office: 2,234,479 admissions (France)

The Legend of Frenchie King (French: Les Pétroleuses, also known as Petroleum Girls) is a 1971 French, Spanish, Italian and British international co-production western comedy film directed by Christian-Jaque and starring Claudia Cardinale and Brigitte Bardot.

== Plot ==
In Bougival Junction, Texas in 1888 the Francophone town is led by Marie Sarrazin. A new family arrives, calling themselves the Millers, but in fact they are the daughters of the hanged outlaw Frenchie King. His eldest daughter Louise seeks to keep her father's name alive by donning men's clothing and continuing his criminal ways. Louise and Marie fight, but when they are jailed, they team up to take revenge on the town's men.

== Cast ==
- Claudia Cardinale as Marie Sarrazin
- Brigitte Bardot as Louise a.k.a. Frenchie King
- Michael J. Pollard as the Marshal
- Patty Shepard as Petite Pluie
- Emma Cohen as Virginie
- Teresa Gimpera as Caroline
- Oscar Davis as Mathieu
- Georges Beller as Marc
- Patrick Préjean as Luc
- Riccardo Salvino as Jean
- Henri Czarniak as Doc Miller
- Valéry Inkijnoff as Spitting Bull
- Micheline Presle as Aunt Amelie
- Denise Provence as Mlle. Letellier
- Leroy Hayns as Marquis
- José Luis López Vázquez as a barber
- Manuel Zarzo as a roulette player
- Jacques Jouanneau as M. Letellier
- Raoul Delfossé as Le Cornac
- France Dougnac as Elisabeth

== Production ==
The movie was Bardot's third Western, following Viva Maria and Shalako. It was also Cardinale's third Western, after The Professionals and Once Upon a Time in the West.

Paul Wheeler says he was approached by Michael Deeley to write a buddy Western for Brigitte Bardot. He was paid £1,000 to do the job in two days. Wheeler says this film was not made.

At one stage the film was called Love on Horseback. Filming took place in Spain near Madrid and started in June 1971.

Finance was partly provided by Hemdale.

Guy Casaril started directing the movie but quit and was replaced during the shoot by Christian-Jaque. Christian Jaque said "‘I think it’s a lively and eventful story that does justice to the talents of its heroines. It’s a more a satire than a parody. Zany but not exaggerated . . . with all the trappings of the Western, Sheriff, Indians, saloon, chases and fights. Brigitte was very brave because she hates physical pain. Claudia is a real tomboy—up in the mornings early to ride and shoot."

The director found it "enormously satisfying working with" Michael J Pollard. "He does so much with a character that might have been quite ordinary. To me, he is as important as the two women."

== Release ==
The premiere of Les Pétroleuses was on 17 December 1971 at the Balzac cinema in Paris.

== Reception ==
=== Box office ===
The film grossed £250,000 in three weeks in France.

=== Critical response ===
The film received generally negative reviews. Bardot's performance in particular was criticised by Jean Loup Passek, who noted how uncomfortable she seemed in the film's outdoors action setting. Writing in Variety Gene Moskowitz dismissed the film as "predictable, naïve and gauche" whilst Tom Milne called it "drearily unfunny".

Filmink argued Claudia Cardinale "suited the genre" of Westerns "it’s a shame she didn’t make more."

== See also ==
- List of Spaghetti Western films
- 1971 in film

== Notes ==
- Crawley, Bebe (1977). The Films of Brigitte Bardot. Citadel.
