= The Gamblers (1950 film) =

- Directed by: Claude Barma
- Written by: Nikolai Gogol
- Starring: Louis de Funès
- Music by: Paul Misraki
- Release date: 20 December 1950 (France)
- Running time: 53 minutes
- Country: France
- Language: French

The Gamblers (French: Les joueurs), is a French comedy film from 1950, directed by Claude Barma, and starring Louis de Funès. It is an adaptation of Nikolai Gogol's comedy The Gamblers (1836).

== Cast ==
- Louis de Funès: Piotr Petrovitch Shvokhniev
- Jacques Morel: Uteshitelny Stepan Ivanovich
- Pierre Gallon: Alexandr Mikhailovich Glov jr.
- Jacques Grello
- Daniel Lecourtois: Ikhariev
- Alexandre Rignault: Krugel
- Henri Rollan: Mikhail Alexandrovich Glov sr.
- Jean-Marc Tennberg
