= Jacques Morel (actor) =

French actor

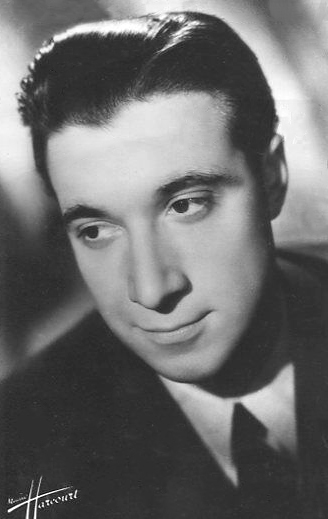
- Morel in 1950
- Born: Jacques Jean Alphonse Houstraëte; May 29, 1922; Paris, France
- Died: April 9, 2008 (aged 85); Paris, France
- Resting place: Villeneuve-Saint-Georges Cemetery
- Occupation: Actor
- Years active: 1941-1993

Morel voiced the character Obelix

Jacques Jean Alphonse Houstraëte (May 29, 1922 – April 9, 2008), professionally known as Jacques Morel, was a French film and television actor. He was the French language voice of the cartoon character Obelix in the animated adaptation of the Asterix comic book.

He was a graduate of HEC Paris.

Jacques Morel died in Paris, France, on April 9, 2008, at the age of 85.

== Partial filmography ==
- L'aventure est au coin de la rue (1944) - L'homme mystérieuse
- Alone in the Night (1945) - Melor
- Toute la famille était là (1948) - Villediou
- Between Eleven and Midnight (1949) - Bouture
- The Little Zouave (1950) - Félix Lambert
- Voyage for Three (1950) - Maurice
- The Girl from Maxim's (1950) - Le docteur Petypon
- The Happy Man (1950) - Edouard Jolivet
- Les joueurs (1951, TV Movie)
- Topaze (1951) - Régis Castel-Vernac
- Victor (1951) - Jacques Genoust
- Le Dindon (1951) - Vatelin
- La poison (1951) - (voice)
- Au fil des ondes (1951) - Himself
- We Are All Murderers (1952) - Charles
- Une fille dans le soleil (1953) - Boissières
- A Woman's Treasure (1953) - Albert Brunet
- Les amours finissent à l'aube (1953) - Van Goffin
- Rue de l'Estrapade (1953) - Marcel
- Une nuit à Megève (1953) - Léon
- Mandat d'amener (1953) - Gaston
- Royal Affairs in Versailles (1954) - Bohmer (uncredited)
- After You Duchess (1954) - Armand
- Les hommes ne pensent qu'à ça (1954) - Le parfait séducteur
- Service Entrance (1954) - Georges Dumény
- The Grand Maneuver (1955) - Monsieur Monnet
- Scandal in Montmartre (1955) - Monsieur Maugeat
- Si Paris nous était conté (1956) - Le gouverneur Jourdan
- Marie Antoinette Queen of France (1956) - Louis XVI
- Elena and Her Men (1956) - Duchêne
- Folies-Bergère (1956) - Roland
- The Seventh Commandment (1957) - Pilou
- The Suspects (1957) - Inspecteur Paul Duchamp
- A Certain Monsieur Jo (1958) - Inspecteur Loriot
- Sacrée jeunesse (1958) - Étienne Longué
- Life Together (1958) - Claude
- Madame et son auto (1958) - Victor Martini
- Clara et les méchants (1959) - Charlemagne
- Drôles de phénomènes (1959) - Jérôme Dandaine
- Maigret and the Saint-Fiacre Case (1959) - Maître Mauléon
- Le panier à crabes (1960) - Le producteur
- À rebrousse-poil (1961) - M. Durand
- L'imprevisto (1961) - Inspector Chattard
- Rencontres (1962) - David
- The Man from Cocody (1965) - Rouffignac
- Les mordus de Paris (1965)
- La corde au cou (1965) - Le chauffeur de taxi
- Pleins feux sur Stanislas (1965) - Le percepteur
- Asterix the Gaul (1967) - Obelix (voice)
- Asterix and Cleopatra (1968) - Obelix (voice)
- L'auvergnat et l'autobus (1969) - Kleinfuchs
- The Twelve Tasks of Asterix (1976) - Obelix (voice)
- Ça fait tilt (1978) - Francis
- L'exercice du pouvoir (1978) - Albert Larchat
- La Ballade des Dalton (1978) - Sam Game, le prêcheur et tricheur repenti (voice)
- L'amour en question (1978) - Le Président
- Julien Fontanes, magistrat (1980–1989, TV Series) - Juge Julien Fontane (final appearance)
