= Denise Provence =

French actor

- Born: 17 February 1921; Paris, France
- Died: 14 November 2011 (aged 90); Tours, Indre-et-Loire, France
- Occupation: Actress
- Years active: 1946–1997 (film & TV)

Denise Provence (1921–2011) was a French stage, film and television actress.

== Filmography ==
Year	Title	Role	Notes
1946	Pas un mot à la reine mère		
1949	Branquignol	Une danseuse	Uncredited
1950	Miquette	Une commère	Uncredited
1950	The Paris Waltz	Brigitte	
1950	Et moi j'te dis qu'elle t'a fait d'l'oeil!	Suzanne Lambertier	
1951	The Turkey	Clotilde de Pontagnac	
1951	Les deux Monsieur de Madame	Isabelle	
1951	A Love Under an Umbrella	La femme de l'ami du touriste	Uncredited
1953	A Caprice of Darling Caroline	Comtesse Clélia de Montelone	
1953	The Porter from Maxim's	Lise	
1955	Blackmail	Gisèle	
1957	Les Truands	La Païva	
1959	Winter Holidays	Marceline	
1961	The Lions Are Loose	Hélène Challenberg	
1961	Les nouveaux aristocrates		
1963	Landru	Madame Laporte	
1964	Une ravissante idiote	Lady Barbara Dumfrey	
1964	Jealous as a Tiger	Mme Lurot	
1964	Angélique, Marquise des Anges	Barbe	
1965	Marvelous Angelique	Barbe	
1967	Les grandes vacances	La comtesse	
1971	Les vieux loups bénissent la mort		
1971	The Legend of Frenchie King	Mademoiselle Le Croisic	
1973	The Mad Adventures of Rabbi Jacob	Esther Schmoll	
1974	Gross Paris	La reine d'Angleterre	
1975	Le mâle du siècle	La mère d'Isabelle	
1978	Le beaujolais nouveau est arrivé		
1981	Pourquoi pas nous?	La patronne de l'hôtel	

== Bibliography ==
- Klossner, Michael. The Europe of 1500-1815 on Film and Television: A Worldwide Filmography of Over 2550 Works, 1895 Through 2000. McFarland & Company, 2002.
