= Gambais =

- Commune
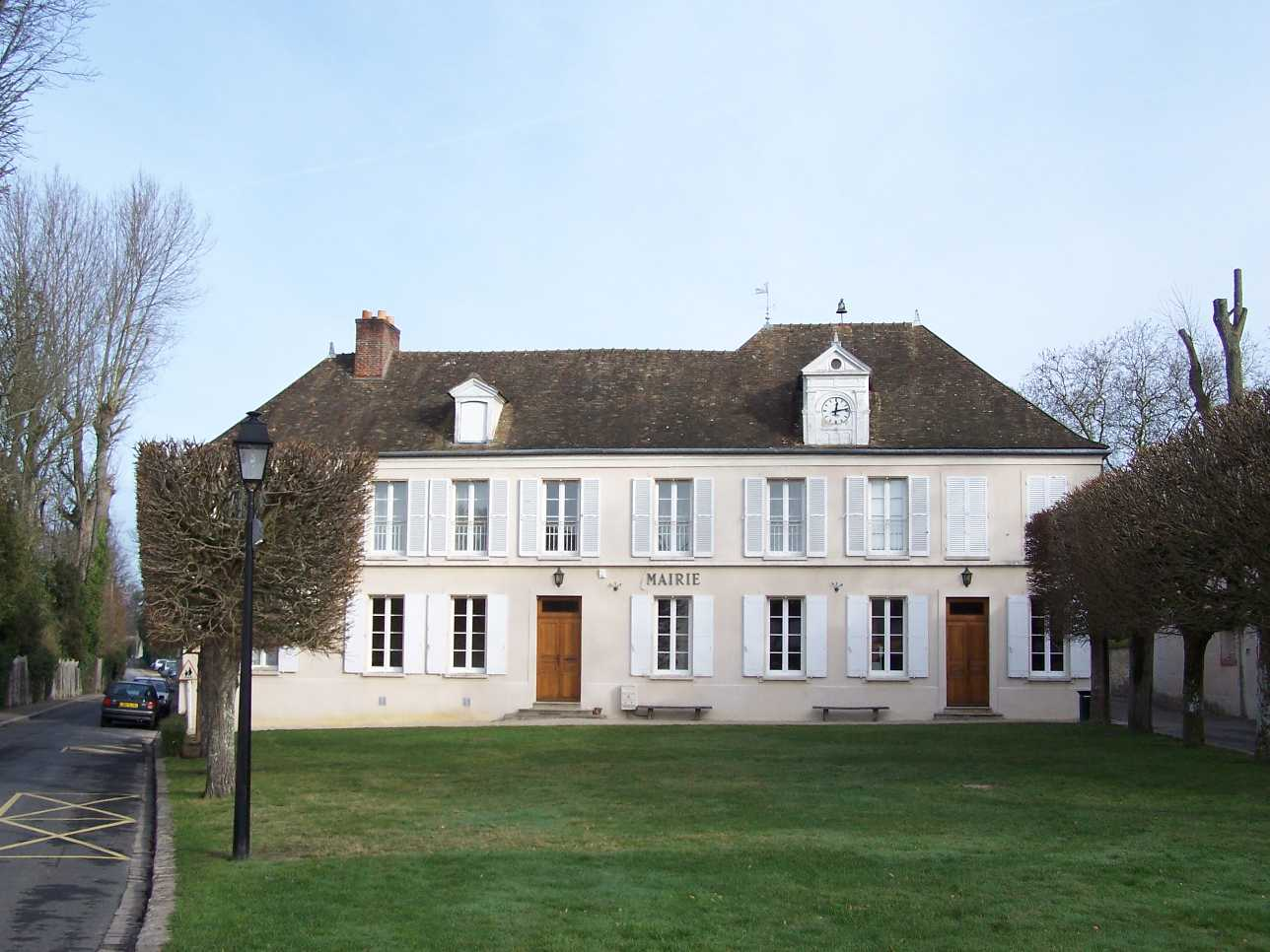
- Town hall

- Coat of arms
- Location of Gambais
- Location within France Location within Île-de-France (region)
- Coordinates: 48°46′26″N 1°40′26″E
- Country: France
- Region: Île-de-France
- Department: Yvelines
- Arrondissement: Rambouillet
- Canton: Aubergenville

Government
  - Mayor (2020–2026): Raphaël Nivoit
- Area^{1}: 23.02 km^{2} (8.89 sq mi)
- Highest elevation: 182 m (597 ft)
- Lowest elevation: 94 m (308 ft)
- Population (2023): 2,574
  - Density: 111.8/km^{2} (289.6/sq mi)
- Time zone: UTC+01:00 (CET)
  - Summer (DST): UTC+02:00 (CEST)
- INSEE/Postal code: 78263 /78950
- ^{1} French Land Register data, which excludes lakes, ponds, glaciers > 1 km^{2} (0.386 sq mi or 247 acres) and river estuaries.

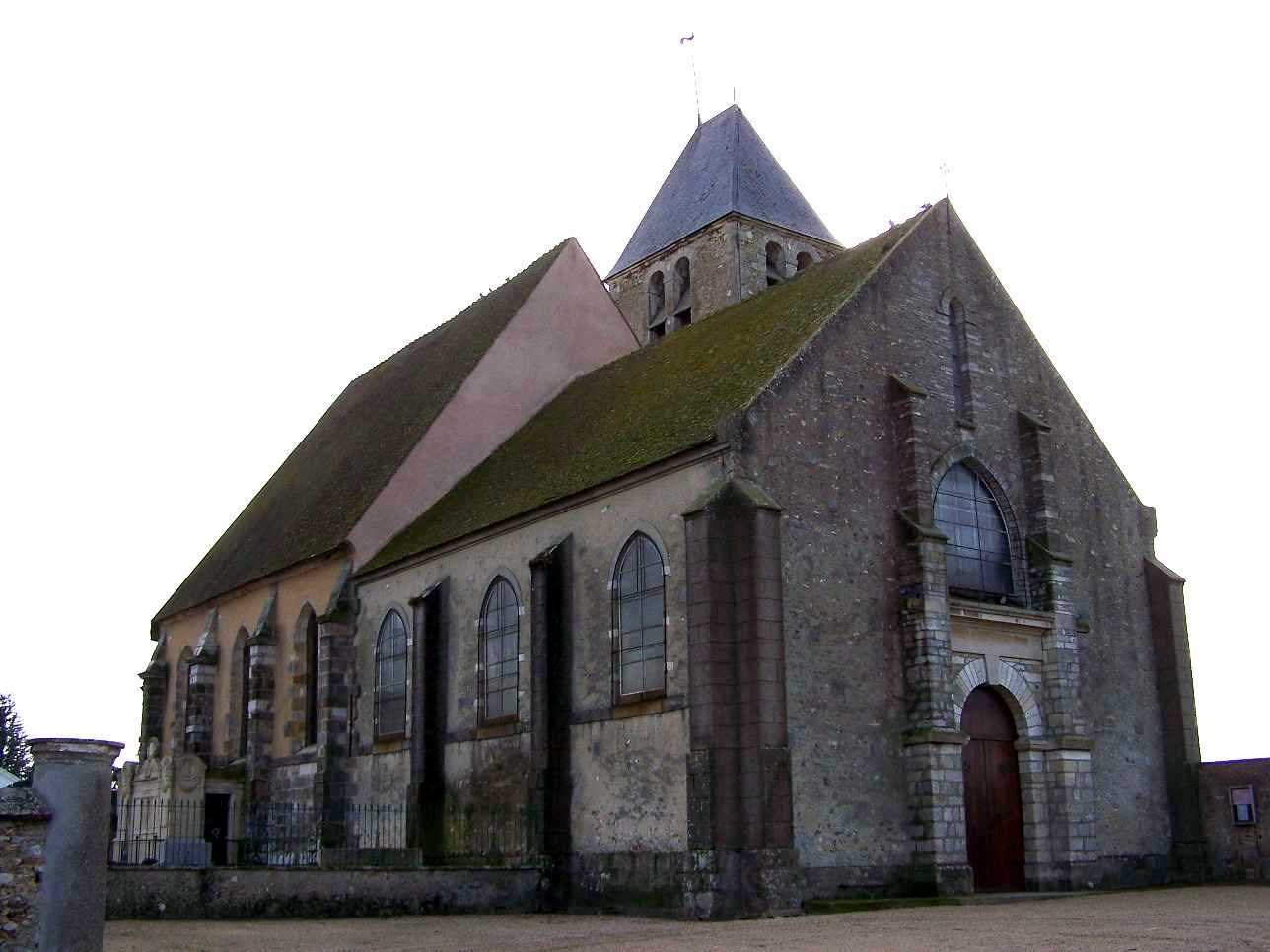
Saint-Aignan

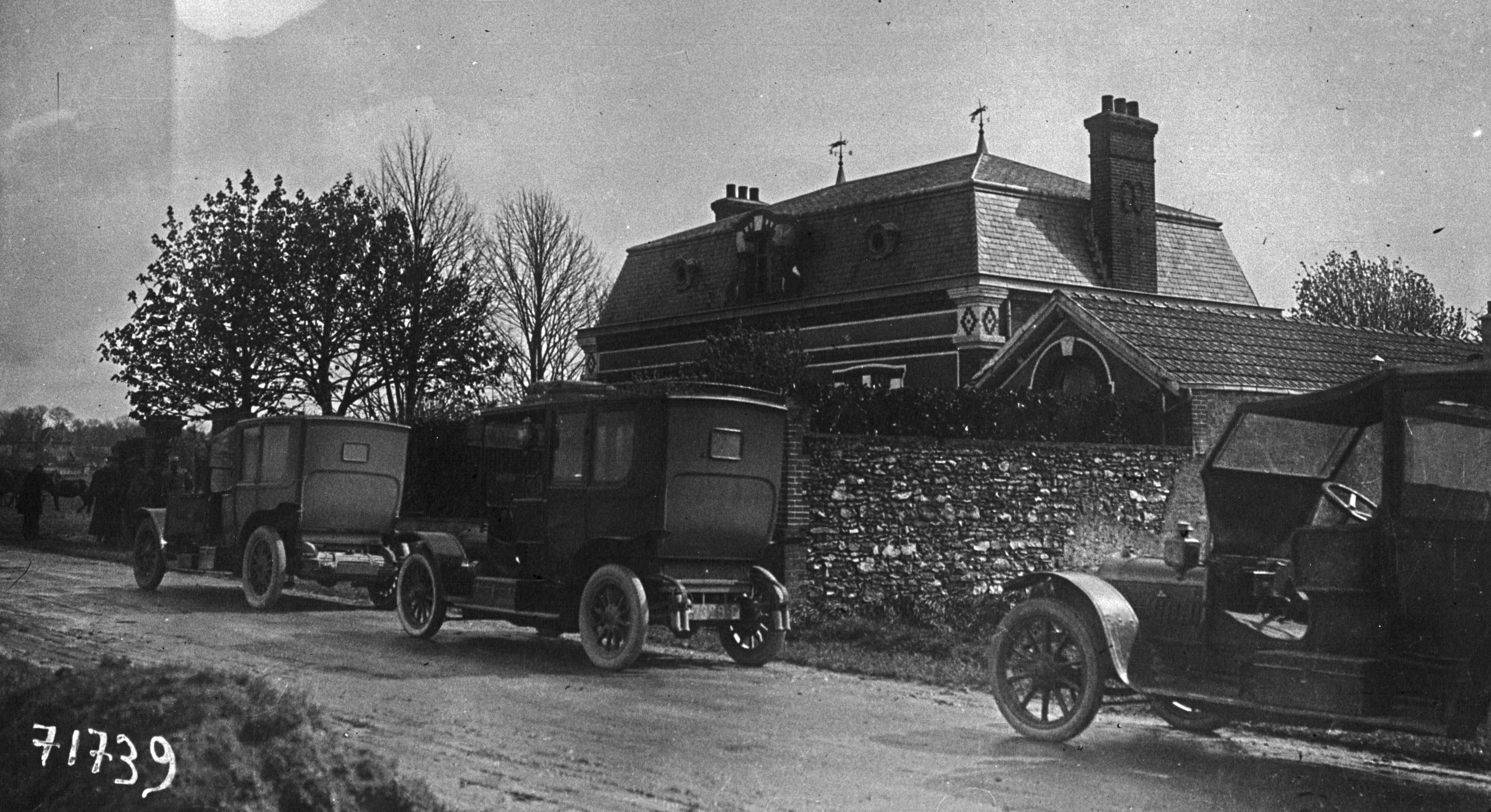
Henri Landru's villa at Gambais, 1 March 1919

Gambais (French: [ɡɑ̃bɛ]) is a commune in the Yvelines department in the Île-de-France region in north-central France. The commune is 58 km west from the center of Paris.

== Population ==
Historical population
Year	Pop.	±% p.a.
1968	1,084	—
1975	1,239	+1.93%
1982	1,365	+1.39%
1990	1,730	+3.01%
1999	2,064	+1.98%
2007	2,383	+1.81%
2012	2,423	+0.33%
2017	2,463	+0.33%
2023	2,574	+0.74%
Source: INSEE

== See also ==
- Communes of the Yvelines department
