= Claude Barma =

French director

Claude Barma (3 November 1918, in Nice – 30 August 1992, in Paris), was a French director and screenwriter, and an early creator of French television programmes.

== Biography ==
After studying electrical engineering, he entered television in 1946 with the drama Chambre 34, his directorial debut.

On 24 February 1950, he produced the first live French television show by transmitting part of Marivaux's Le Jeu de l'amour et du hasard and the Comédie-Française.

His first series followed in 1950, Agence Nostradamus, which was also the first series on French television.

In 1955, he staged a trial court scripted by Peter Desgraupes and Dumayet Peter (producers of the series). En votre âme et conscience was an original series, designed for small-screen drama, taking place entirely in a court where the camera filmed uninterrupted.

In 1959, the television drama Les Trois Mousquetaires was adapted by Barma for live transmission, with the role of D'Artagnan played by the young Jean-Paul Belmondo, who would later be known for his roles in À bout de souffle and Classe tous risques.

In the early 1960s, he adapted three Shakespeare plays: Macbeth in 1959, Hamlet in 1960 and Othello in 1962 .

In 1967, Les Enquêtes du commissaire Maigret depicted the popular character Jules Maigret, created by Georges Simenon. Barma oversaw the series until 1981.

Claude Barma died in 1992, and was buried in Ars-en-Ré in Charente-Maritime.

== Major works ==
- 1991 : Le Manège de Pauline (TV) 1991 : The Armoury of Pauline (TV)
- 1991 : Le Squale (TV) 1991 : The Squale (TV)
- 1990 : Coma dépassé (TV) 1990 : Coma exceeded (TV)
- 1989 : Les Sirènes de minuit (TV) 1989 : The Sirens of Midnight (TV)
- 1985 : Hôtel de police, série TV 1985 : Hall police TV series
- 1984 : Emmenez-moi au théâtre : Amphitryon 38 1984 : Take me to the theater: Amphitryon 38
- 1967 - 1982 : Les Enquêtes du commissaire Maigret (45 épisodes) In 1967 - 1 982 : The Investigation of Inspector Maigret (45 episodes)
- 1979 : Orient-Express (mini-série TV) 1979 : Orient-Express (TV miniseries)
- 1977 : Dossiers : Danger immédiat, série télévisée 1977 : Records: Danger, television series
- 1972 : La Tragédie de Vérone (TV) 1972 : The Tragedy of Verona (TV)
- 1972 : Les Rois maudits (TV) 1972 : The Accursed Kings (TV)
- 1969 : D'Artagnan (TV) 1969 : D'Artagnan (TV)
- 1966 : Corsaires et flibustiers (série TV) 1966 : Corsairs and pirates (TV series)
- 1965 : Belphégor ou le Fantôme du Louvre (TV) 1965 : Belphegor or the Phantom of the Louvre (TV)
- 1963 : L'inspecteur Leclerc enquête (TV) 1963 : The inquiry inspector Leclerc (TV)
- 1962 : La nuit des rois (TV) 1962 : Twelfth Night (TV)
- 1962 : Les Parisiennes (séquence Françoise ) 1962 : Les Parisiennes (sequence Françoise)
- 1960 : Cyrano de Bergerac pour la RTF 1960 : Cyrano de Bergerac for the RTF
- 1960 : Du côté de l'enfer (TV) 1960 : On the side of Hell (TV)
- 1959 : Les Trois Mousquetaires 1959 : The Three Musketeers
- 1958 : Les Femmes des autres 1958 : The Women of other
- 1957 : En votre âme et conscience, de Pierre Desgraupes et Pierre Dumayet 1957 : In all conscience, to Desgraupes Pierre and Pierre Dumayet
- 1957 : Casino de Paris 1957 : Casino de Paris
- 1954 : Nous irons à Valparaiso (TV)
- 1953 : Madame Bovary 1953 : Madame Bovary
- 1951 : The Turkey
- 1950 : The Gamblers

== Theatre ==
- 1956 : Monsieur Masure de Claude Magnier, Comédie-Wagram 1956 : Mr. Hovel Claude Magnier, Comedy Wagram
- 1960 : Un garçon d'honneur d' Antoine Blondin et Paul Guimard d'après Le Crime de Lord Arthur Saville d' Oscar Wilde, Théâtre Marigny 1960 : A groomsman to Antoine Blondin and Paul Guimard from The Crime of Lord Arthur Saville of Oscar Wilde, Theatre Marigny
- 1960 : Hamlet de William Shakespeare, Grand Théâtre de la Cité Carcassonne 1960 : Hamlet by William Shakespeare, Grand Theatre de la Cite Carcassonne

== Awards ==
- 1957 : Grand Prix de la télévision française 1957 Grand Prix French television
