= 1971 in literature =

This article contains information about the literary events and publications of 1971.

== Events ==
- March 25–December 14 – The 1971 killing of Bengali intellectuals reaches a peak.
- April 21 – The 13th-century Codex Regius manuscript is returned by Denmark to Iceland under naval escort.
- June – The federal Australian Government removes 1969 novel Portnoy's Complaint from the list of books prohibited from import into Australia in the face of its widespread legal availability in the country. It is the last literary publication to have been challenged with censorship before the Australian courts.
- June 30 – Release of musical film Willy Wonka & the Chocolate Factory in the United States, based on Roald Dahl's 1964 children's novel Charlie and the Chocolate Factory. Although Dahl is credited for the screenplay, creative differences with the production team cause him to disown the picture.
- July 4 – Michael S. Hart posts the first e-book, a copy of the United States Declaration of Independence, on the University of Illinois at Urbana–Champaign's mainframe computer, as the origin of Project Gutenberg.
- July 14 – Simon Gray's play Butley has its first performance at the Criterion Theatre in London, produced by Michael Codron and directed by Harold Pinter, with Alan Bates in the lead.
- October 20 – The Destiny Waltz by Gerda Charles wins the U.K.'s first Whitbread Novel of the Year Award. Geoffrey Hill wins the poetry prize for Mercian Hymns and Michael Meyer the biography category for Henrik Ibsen.
- November – Hunter S. Thompson's roman à clef Fear and Loathing in Las Vegas: A Savage Journey to the Heart of the American Dream is first published in Rolling Stone, as a two-part article illustrated by Ralph Steadman.
- November 29 – Yuri Lyubimov's production of Hamlet is seen first at the Taganka Theatre in Moscow, with singer-songwriter and poet Vladimir Vysotsky in the lead.
- December 24 – The Dutch writer and broadcaster Godfried Bomans is buried in the Sint-Adelbertskerkhof (St. Adelbert Cemetery) in Bloemendaal, the Netherlands, two days after he dies from a heart attack.
- unknown date – Powell's Books opens its first bookstore in Portland, Oregon.

== New books ==
=== Fiction ===
- Kingsley Amis – Girl, 20
- Hiroshi Aramata (荒俣 宏) – Teito Monogatari (Tale of the Capitol)
- Kofi Awoonor – This Earth, My Brother
- Ingeborg Bachmann – Malina
- Denys Val Baker – The Face in the Mirror
- Nanni Balestrini – Vogliamo tutto (We Want Everything)
- John Bingham – Vulture in the Sun
- William Peter Blatty – The Exorcist
- Richard Brautigan – Revenge of the Lawn
- Charles Bukowski – Post Office
- Albert Camus (died 1960) – A Happy Death (La Mort heureuse)
- Victor Canning – Firecrest
- John Dickson Carr – Deadly Hall
- Agatha Christie
  - Nemesis
  - The Golden Ball and Other Stories
- Brian Cleeve – Cry of Morning
- Miloš Crnjanski – Roman o Londonu (A Novel about London)
- Gwen Davis – Touching
- L. Sprague de Camp – The Clocks of Iraz
- L. Sprague de Camp and Lin Carter – Conan the Buccaneer
- Walter de la Mare – Eight Tales
- August Derleth, editor – Dark Things
- E. L. Doctorow – The Book of Daniel
- Hubert Fichte – Detlevs Imitationen »Grünspan« (Detlev's imitations, "verdigris")
- E. M. Forster (died 1970) – Maurice (originally completed 1914)
- Frederick Forsyth – The Day of the Jackal
- Dick Francis – Bonecrack
- Sarah Gainham – Private Worlds
- Ernest J. Gaines – The Autobiography of Miss Jane Pittman
- George Garrett – Death of the Fox
- John Gardner – Grendel
- William Golding – The Scorpion God
- Richard Gordon – The Medical Witness
- Arthur Hailey – Wheels
- L.P. Hartley – The Harness Room
- Bohumil Hrabal – I Served the King of England (Obsluhoval jsem anglického krále)
- David Ireland – The Unknown Industrial Prisoner
- B. S. Johnson – House Mother Normal
- Ismail Kadare – Chronicle in Stone (Kronikë në gur)
- Anna Kavan – A Scarcity of Love
- Thomas Keneally – The Chant of Jimmie Blacksmith
- Jerzy Kosinski – Being There
- Jacques Laurent – Les Bêtises
- John le Carré – The Naive and Sentimental Lover
- Ursula K. Le Guin – The Lathe of Heaven
- Stanisław Lem
  - The Star Diaries (Dzienniki gwiazdowe)
  - The Futurological Congress (Kongres futurologiczny)
- Peter Lovesey – The Detective Wore Silk Drawers
- Brian Lumley – The Caller of the Black
- John D. MacDonald – A Tan and Sandy Silence
- Antonine Maillet – La Sagouine
- Ruth Manning-Sanders – A Choice of Magic
- James A. Michener – The Drifters
- Gladys Mitchell – Lament for Leto
- Nicholas Mosley – Natalie Natalia
- Alice Munro – Lives of Girls and Women
- Iris Murdoch – An Accidental Man
- V. S. Naipaul – In a Free State
- William F. Nolan – Space for Hire
- Flannery O'Connor (died 1964) – The Complete Stories (collection)
- Walker Percy – Love in the Ruins
- Rosamunde Pilcher – The End of Summer
- Anthony Powell – Books Do Furnish a Room
- Terry Pratchett – The Carpet People
- Otfried Preußler – Krabat
- Joao Ubaldo Ribeiro – Sergeant Getulio
- Mordecai Richler – St. Urbain's Horseman
- Harold Robbins – The Betsy
- Leonardo Sciascia – Il contesto
- Paul Scott – The Towers of Silence (third part of The Raj Quartet)
- Hubert Selby Jr. – The Room
- Cynthia Propper Seton – The Sea Change of Angela Lewes
- Tom Sharpe – Riotous Assembly
- Alexander Solzhenitsyn – August 1914
- Wallace Stegner – Angle of Repose
- Irving Stone – The Passions of the Mind
- Francis Stuart – Black List, Section H
- Gay Talese – Honor Thy Father
- Tom Tryon – The Other
- Fred Uhlman – Reunion
- John Updike – Rabbit Redux
- Joseph Wambaugh – The New Centurions
- Herman Wouk – The Winds of War
- Roger Zelazny
  - The Doors of His Face, The Lamps of His Mouth, and Other Stories
  - Jack of Shadows

=== Children and young people ===
- Gillian Avery – A Likely Lad
- Jack Bickham – The Apple Dumpling Gang
- Virginia Hamilton – The Planet of Junior Brown
- Roger Hargreaves – Mr. Men (first six of a series of 49 books)
- Judith Kerr – When Hitler Stole Pink Rabbit (first of the Out of the Hitler Time trilogy)
- Bill Peet
  - The Caboose Who Got Loose
  - How Droofus the Dragon Lost His Head
- Otfried Preußler – Krabat (The Satanic Mill)
- Dr. Seuss – The Lorax
- Marjorie W. Sharmat – Getting Something on Maggie Marmelstein

=== Drama ===
- Dario Fo – Tutti uniti! Tutti insieme! Ma scusa, quello non è il padrone? (United We Stand! All Together Now! Oops, Isn't That the Boss?)
- Simon Gray – Butley
- Peter Handke – Der Ritt über den Bodensee (The Ride across Lake Constance)
- Franz Xaver Kroetz
  - Hartnäckig (Persistent)
  - Heimarbeit (Housework)
  - Michis Blut: ein Requiem auf bairisch (Michi's Blood: a Requiem in Bavarian)
  - Stallerhof
  - Wildwechsel
- Mustapha Matura – As Time Goes By
- John Mortimer – A Voyage Round My Father (stage version)
- Martin Walser – Ein Kinderspiel

=== Poetry ===
- Maya Angelou – Just Give Me a Cool Drink of Water 'fore I Diiie
- Kofi Awoonor – Night of My Blood
- Donald S. Fryer – Songs and Sonnets Atlantean
- Alan Llwyd – Y March Hud (The Magic Horse)
- Clark Ashton Smith – Selected Poems

=== Non-fiction ===
- G. E. M. Anscombe – Causality and Determination
- Pierre Berton – The Last Spike
- Carlos Castaneda – A Separate Reality: Further Conversations with Don Juan
- Dharampal – Indian Science and Technology in the Eighteenth Century: Some Contemporary European Accounts
- Robert Coles
  - Migrants, Sharecroppers, Mountaineers, vol. 2 of Children of Crisis
  - The South Goes North, vol 3. of Children of Crisis
- Carl N. Degler – Neither Black nor White
- Brian J. Ford – Nonscience
- Robert Foster – The Complete Guide to Middle-earth
- Eduardo Galeano – Open Veins of Latin America (Las venas abiertas de América Latina)
- Joan Garrity – The Sensuous Woman
- Ionel Gherea – Despre cîteva absurdități folositoare (On Those More Useful Absurdities)
- Graham Greene – A Sort of Life
- Xaviera Hollander – The Happy Hooker: My Own Story
- H. P. Lovecraft – Selected Letters III (1929–1931)
- Roger Manvell and Heinrich Fraenkel – Hess: A Biography
- Spike Milligan – Adolf Hitler: My Part in His Downfall
- Alison Plowden – Young Elizabeth
- John Rawls – A Theory of Justice
- B. F. Skinner – Beyond Freedom and Dignity
- Keith Thomas – Religion and the Decline of Magic: Studies in Popular Beliefs in 16th and 17th-century England
- Pierre Vallières – White Niggers of America (translation)
- Esther Vilar – The Manipulated Man

== Births ==
- January 6 – Karin Slaughter, American crime novelist
- January 16 – Helen Darville, Australian novelist
- January 18 – Binyavanga Wainaina, Kenyan writer (died 2019)
- January 25 – Philip Coppens, Belgian journalist and author (died 2012)
- February 3 – Sarah Kane, English playwright (suicide 1999)
- March 13 – Viet Thanh Nguyen, Vietnamese fiction writer
- March 29 – José Luis Rodríguez Pittí, Panamanian writer and photographer
- May 9 – Dan Chiasson, American poet, critic and journalist
- May 25 - Nicole Luiken, Canadian science fiction writer
- June 4 – Karl Martin Sinijärv, Estonian journalist and poet
- June 28 – Sophie Hannah, English poet and novelist
- July 17 – Cory Doctorow, Canadian science fiction writer
- July 22 – Akhil Sharma, Indian novelist
- July 23 – Mohsin Hamid, Pakistani fiction writer
- September 3 – Kiran Desai, Indian novelist
- October 17 - Patrick Ness, British-American speculative fiction author
- October 25 – Elif Shafak (Elif Şafak), French-born Turkish novelist
- November 5 – Rana Dasgupta, English-born Indian novelist
- December 19 – Tristan Egolf, American novelist and activist (died 2005)
- unknown dates
  - Petina Gappah, Zambian-born fiction writer
  - John Wray, American novelist

== Deaths ==
- January 18 – N. Porsenna, Romanian novelist, essayist, poet and social psychologist (Parkinson's disease, born 1892)
- January 24 – St. John Greer Ervine, Irish-born dramatist (born 1883)
- March 5 – Allan Nevins, American journalist and historian (born 1890)
- March 7 – Stevie Smith (Florence Margaret Smith), English poet and novelist (born 1902)
- March 21 – Kyūya Fukada (深田 久弥), Japanese writer and mountaineer (born 1903)
- March 23 – Simon Vestdijk, Dutch writer (born 1898)
- April 10 – André Billy, French novelist (born 1882)
- April 13 – Juhan Smuul, Estonian writer (born 1922)
- April 15 – Friedebert Tuglas, Estonian writer and critic (born 1886)
- May 19 – Ogden Nash, American poet and humorist (born 1902)
- May 20 – Waldo Williams, Welsh-language poet (born 1904)
- June 1 – Reinhold Niebuhr, American theologian (born 1892)
- June 4 – György Lukács (György Bernát Löwinger), Hungarian philosopher and critic (born 1885)
- June 5 – Clifford Dyment, English poet (born 1914)
- June 6 – Edward Andrade, English writer, poet and physicist (born 1887)
- July 4
  - Maurice Bowra, English poet, humorist and Oxford don (born 1898)
  - August Derleth, American writer and anthologist (heart attack, born 1909)
- July 7 – Claude Gauvreau, Québécois Canadian poet and dramatist (born 1925)
- July 27 – Jacques Lusseyran, French author and Resistance fighter (car crash, born 1924)
- August 30 – Peter Fleming, English travel writer and traveller (born 1907)
- October 13 – János Kemény, American-born Hungarian writer and editor (born 1903)
- October 21 – Naoya Shiga, Japanese novelist (pneumonia, born 1883)
- October 25 – Philip Wylie, American novelist and non-fiction writer (born 1902)
- November – Lucia Mantu, Romanian writer (born 1888)
- November 1 – Gertrud von Le Fort, German novelist, poet and essayist (born 1876)
- November 10 – Walter Van Tilburg Clark, American novelist (cancer, born 1909)
- November 11 – A. P. Herbert, English humorist, novelist and politician (born 1890)
- November 28 – Dimitrie Stelaru (Dumitru Petrescu), Romanian poet and novelist (cirrhosis, born 1917)
- November 29 – Edith Tolkien (née Bratt), English wife of J. R. R. Tolkien (born 1889)
- December 5 – Gaito Gazdanov, Russian-born novelist (born 1903)
- December 22 – Godfried Bomans, Dutch writer and broadcaster (heart attack, born 1913)
- December 25 – S. Foster Damon, American critic and poet (born 1893)

== Awards ==
- Nobel Prize for Literature: Pablo Neruda

=== Canada ===
- See 1971 Governor General's Awards for complete list.

=== France ===
- Prix Goncourt: Jacques Laurent, Les Bêtises
- Prix Médicis: Pascal Lainé, L'Irrévolution

=== United Kingdom ===
- Booker Prize: V. S. Naipaul, In a Free State
- Carnegie Medal for children's literature: Ivan Southall, Josh
- Cholmondeley Award: Charles Causley, Gavin Ewart, Hugo Williams
- Eric Gregory Award: Martin Booth, Florence Bull, John Pook, D. M. Warman, John Welch
- James Tait Black Memorial Prize for fiction: Nadine Gordimer, A Guest of Honour
- James Tait Black Memorial Prize for biography: Julia Namier, Lewis Namier
- Queen's Gold Medal for Poetry: Stephen Spender

=== United States ===
- Frost Medal: Melville Cane
- Hugo Award:
  - Best Novella: Fritz Leiber, Ill Met in Lankhmar
  - Best Novel: Larry Niven, Ringworld
- Nebula Award: Robert Silverberg, A Time of Changes
- Newbery Medal for children's literature: Betsy Byars, Summer of the Swans
- Pulitzer Prize:
  - Drama: Paul Zindel, The Effect of Gamma Rays on Man-in-the-Moon Marigolds
  - Fiction: no award given
  - Poetry: William S. Merwin, The Carrier of Ladders

=== Elsewhere ===
- Akutagawa Prize: Azuma Mineo, Okinawan Boy
- Friedenspreis des Deutschen Buchhandels: Marion Gräfin Dönhoff
- Miles Franklin Award: David Ireland, The Unknown Industrial Prisoner
- Alfaguara Prize: Luis Berenguer, Leña verde
- Premio Nadal: José María Requena, El cuajarón
- Viareggio Prize: Ugo Attardi, L'erede selvaggio

== Notes ==
- Hahn, Daniel (2015). The Oxford Companion to Children's Literature (2nd ed.). Oxford. University Press. ISBN 9780198715542.
