= Darling Caroline =

Darling Caroline (French: Caroline chérie) may refer to:

- Darling Caroline (novel), a 1947 historical novel by Jacques Laurent
- Darling Caroline (1951 film), a film adaptation directed by Richard Pottier
- Darling Caroline (1968 film), a film adaptation directed by Denys de La Patellière
