= The Sacred Flame =

The Sacred Flame may refer to:

- The Sacred Flame (play), 1928 play
- The Sacred Flame (1929 film), an American film
- The Sacred Flame (1931 film), a German-language version
- The Olympic flame, used in the Olympic torch relay.
