= Caroline and the Rebels =

1955 film

- Directed by: Jean Devaivre
- Written by: Cécil Saint-Laurent (novel); Jacques Delasame
- Produced by: François Chavane; Alain Poiré
- Starring: Jean-Claude Pascal; Sophie Desmarets; Brigitte Bardot
- Cinematography: Maurice Barry
- Edited by: Germaine Artus
- Music by: Georges Van Parys
- Production company: Gaumont Production
- Distributed by: Gaumont Distribution
- Release date: 11 March 1955
- Running time: 105 minutes
- Country: France
- Language: French

Caroline and the Rebels (French: Le Fils de Caroline chérie) is a 1955 French historical adventure film directed by Jean Devaivre and starring Jean-Claude Pascal, Sophie Desmarets and Brigitte Bardot. It is third in the Caroline chérie film series, following Darling Caroline (1951) and A Caprice of Darling Caroline (1953) both of which starred Martine Carol as Caroline. In this movie, however, the character of Caroline never actually appears and is seen only in a miniature.

The movie features an early appearance by Brigitte Bardot.

== Premise ==
Juan, the son of Caroline, has been brought up in a Spanish family and does not know of his heritage. He seduces various women.

== Cast ==
- Jean-Claude Pascal as Juan d'Aranda/de Sallanches
- Sophie Desmarets as Duchess Laure d'Albuquerque
- Brigitte Bardot as Pilar d'Aranda
- Jacques Dacqmine as General Gaston de Sallanche
- Magali Noël as Térésa
- Georges Descrières as Lt. Tinteville
- Alfred Adam as General Lasalle
- Micheline Gary as Conchita d'Aranda
- Germaine Dermoz as Comtesse d'Aranda
- Daniel Ceccaldi as Lt. Bogard
- Robert Dalban as Le capitaine des gendarmes
- Jean Debucourt as Le père supérieur
- Charles Dechamps as L'oncle de Juan
- Albert Dinan as Lt. Guéneau
- Jean Galland as Marquis de Villa-Campo
- Bernard Lajarrige as Lavaux
- Robert Manuel as King Joseph
- Marcel Pérès as Frégos les Papillottes
- Pascale Roberts as Sallanches's friend
- Michel Etcheverry as Priest
- Marcel Bozzuffi as Soldier
- Bernard Musson as L'homme aux fèves

== Production ==
It was shot at the Saint-Maurice Studios in Paris and on location in Roussillon. The film's sets were designed by the art director Jacques Krauss.

== Reception ==
Variety thought the film "looks in for fair b.o" in France "but for the U.S., pic is too naive and languid to make for any possible arty fare, and with its torrid love scenes snipped, there is nothing in this to make for general U.S. chances. Jean-Claude Pascal is vapid as the young lady killer while color is properly pastel. Editing helps get some movement in the better scenes. Shadow of Martine Carol, the previous Caroline, hangs over this and is sorely missed."

The film recorded 1,667,829 admissions in France.

== Bibliography ==
- Hayward, Susan. French Costume Drama of the 1950s: Fashioning Politics in Film. Intellect Books, 2010.
- Rège, Philippe. Encyclopedia of French Film Directors, Volume 1. Scarecrow Press, 2009.
