= Jacques Laurent =

French writer

- Born: Jacques Laurent-Cély; 5 January 1919; Paris, France
- Died: 29 December 2000 (aged 81); Paris, France
- Occupations: Film director, Journalist
- Years active: 1947–1969

Jacques Laurent or Jacques Laurent-Cély (5 January 1919 – 29 December 2000) was a French writer and journalist. He was born in Paris, the son of a barrister. During World War II, he fought with the Algerian Tirailleurs.

Laurent was elected to the Académie française in 1986.

Laurent belonged to the literary group of the Hussards, and is known as a prolific historical novelist, essay writer, and screenwriter under the pen name of Cecil Saint-Laurent. The 1955 film Lola Montès, directed by Max Ophüls, was based on his historic novel based on the life of Lola Montez. He wrote Jean Aurel's Oscar-nominated 1963 World War I documentary, 14-18. He also directed the film Quarante-huit heures d'amour/48 Hours of Love (1969).

Another noteworthy novel by Saint-Laurent was Darling Caroline (written in 1947), a powerful book set in the early days of the French Revolution. This also became a film. This was released in France in 1951, directed by Jean-Devaivre and starring Martine Carol in the title role. Saint-Laurent was one of the scriptwriters of the film.

The 1961 "Les Passagers pour Alger" (translated to English as "Algerian Adventure") was a contemporary thriller, set against the background of the then raging Algerian War, and like many of his books written from the point of view of adventurous, daring young woman.

Laurent received the Prix Goncourt in 1971 for his novel Les Bêtises.

Revolutionary insurgent Ukrainian Anarchist and ally of Nestor Makhno appears in the novel "Clarisse", by Cecil Saint-Laurent.

== Bibliography ==
As Jacques Laurent

- 1947 : La Mort à boire, novel (Éd. Jean Froissart)
- 1948 : Les Corps tranquilles, novel (Éd. Jean Froissart)
- 1951 : Paul et Jean-Paul, essay (Grasset)
- 1954 : Le Petit Canard, novel (Grasset)
- 1964 : Mauriac sous de Gaulle, essay (La Table ronde)
- 1965 : Année 40, essay (with Gabriel Jeantet) (La Table ronde)
- 1966 : La Fin de Lamiel, essay (Julliard)
- 1967 : Au contraire, essay (La Table ronde)
- 1968 : Choses vues au Viêt Nam, essay (La Table ronde)
- 1969 : Lettre ouverte aux étudiants, essay (Albin Michel)
- 1971 : Les Bêtises, novel (Prix Goncourt, 1971) (Grasset)
- 1972 : Neuf perles de culture, essay (with Claude Martine) (Gallimard)
- 1976 : Histoire égoïste, essay (La Table ronde)
- 1979 : Le Nu vêtu et dévêtu, essay (Gallimard)
- 1980 : Roman du roman, essay (Gallimard)
- 1981 : Les Sous-Ensembles flous, novel (Grasset)
- 1982 : Les Dimanches de Mademoiselle Beaunon, novel (Grasset)
- 1984 : Stendhal comme Stendhal, essay (Grasset)
- 1986 : Le Dormeur debout, novel (Gallimard)
- 1988 : Le Français en cage, essay, (Grasset)
- 1990 : Le Miroir aux tiroirs (Grasset)
- 1994 : Du mensonge, essay (Plon)
- 1994 : L'Inconnu du temps qui passe (Grasset)
- 1997 : Moments particuliers (Grasset)
- 1999 : L'Esprit des lettres (Éditions de Fallois)
- 2000 : Ja et la Fin de tout (Grasset)

As J.C Laurent

- 1950 : Ne touchez pas à la hache!, detective novel (S.C.E.L / Éditions Je sers no. 1 de la Collection Œdipe)

As Cecil Saint-Laurent

- 1947 : Darling Caroline
- 1949 : Captain Steel (French adaptation of Mildred MacNeilly's novel Praise at Morning)
- 1950 : Le Fils de Caroline chérie
- 1951 : Les Caprices de Caroline
- 1952 : À bouche que veux-tu (Flammarion)
- 1953 : Sophie et le crime (Prix du Quai des Orfèvres)
- 1953 : Lucrèce Borgia
- 1954 : Mata Hari's Daughter
- 1954 : Une sacrée salade
- 1955 : Frou-Frou
- 1957 : Prénom Clotilde
- 1958 : L'Algérie quand on y est
- 1961 : Les Agités d'Alger
- 1961 : Les Passagers pour Alger
- 1963-1967 : Hortense 1914-18
- 1969 : Les Petites Filles et les Guerriers
- 1970 : La Communarde
- 1972 : Lola Montes (written several decades ago)
- 1975 : La Bourgeoise
- 1978 : La Mutante
- 1986 : L'Erreur
- 1986 : Histoire imprévue des dessous féminins (Herscher)

As Albéric Varenne

- 1948 : Quand la France occupait l'Europe (éditions le Portulan)

Other pseudonyms
Laurent Labattut, Gilles Bargy, Dupont de Mena, Luc d’Ébreuil, Roland de Jarnèze, Alain Nazelle, Jean Parquin, Gonzague de Pont-Royal, Marc de Saint-Palais, Alain de Sudy, Edgar Vuymont.

== Filmography ==
- Quay of Grenelle, directed by Emil-Edwin Reinert (1950, based on the novel La Mort à boire)
- Darling Caroline, directed by Richard Pottier (1951, based on the novel Caroline Chérie)
- A Caprice of Darling Caroline, directed by Jean Devaivre (1953, based on the novel Les Caprices de Caroline)
- Mata Hari's Daughter, directed by Carmine Gallone and Renzo Merusi (1954, based on the novel La Fille de Mata-Hari)
- Caroline and the Rebels, directed by Jean Devaivre (1955, based on the novel Le Fils de Caroline chérie)
- Frou-Frou, directed by Augusto Genina (1955, based on the novel Frou-Frou)
- Sophie et le Crime, directed by Pierre Gaspard-Huit (1955, based on the novel Sophie et le crime)
- Les mauvaises rencontres, directed by Alexandre Astruc (1955, based on the novel Une sacrée salade)
- Lola Montès, directed by Max Ophüls (1955, based on the novel La Vie Extraordinaire de Lola Montes)
- Darling Caroline, directed by Denys de La Patellière (1968, based on the novel Caroline Chérie)

=== Screenwriter ===
- 1953: Lucrèce Borgia, directed by Christian-Jaque
- 1956: Maid in Paris, directed by Pierre Gaspard-Huit
- 1959: Le secret du Chevalier d'Éon, directed by Jacqueline Audry
- 1962: Le Masque de fer, directed by Henri Decoin
- 1963: 14-18, directed by Jean Aurel
- 1964: All About Loving, directed by Jean Aurel
- 1967: Sept hommes et une garce, directed by Bernard Borderie
- 1967: Lamiel, directed by Jean Aurel
- 1968: Manon 70, directed by Jean Aurel
- 1969: Quarante-huit heures d'amour, directed by Jacques Laurent
- 1969: Les Femmes, directed by Jean Aurel
