= Marthe Mercadier =

French actress (1928–2021)

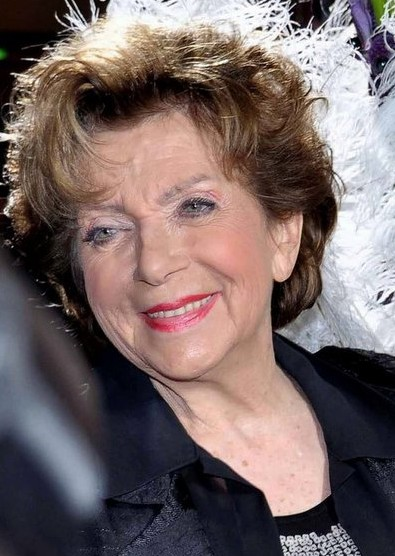
- Born: Marthe Henriett, Fernande Mercadié-Meyrat; 23 October 1928; Saint Ouen, France
- Died: 15 September 2021 (aged 92); Puteaux
- Occupation: Actress
- Years active: 1950–2012
- Spouse: Gérard Néry (1952–1972)
- Children: 1

Marthe Mercadier (23 October 1928 – 15 September 2021) was a French actress.

== Filmography ==
| Year | Title | Role | Director | Notes |
|---|---|---|---|---|
| 1950 | Le tampon du capiston | Mélanie | Maurice Labro | |
| 1950 | Three Telegrams | A bandwidth | Henri Decoin | |
| 1950 | Souvenirs perdus | | Christian-Jaque | |
| 1951 | Darling Caroline | | Richard Pottier | |
| 1951 | Paris Vice Squad | Rose Muchet | Hervé Bromberger | |
| 1951 | Sweet Madness | Juliette | Jean-Paul Paulin | |
| 1951 | The Night Is My Kingdom | Simone | Georges Lacombe | |
| 1951 | The Prettiest Sin in the World | Liliane | Gilles Grangier | |
| 1951 | Coq en pâte | Betty | Charles-Félix Tavano | |
| 1951 | Chacun son tour | Ketty | André Berthomieu | |
| 1951 | Never Two Without Three | Hélène Flouc de la Donzelle | André Berthomieu (2) | |
| 1951 | La maison Bonnadieu | Mlle Clorinde | Carlo Rim | |
| 1952 | Rendezvous in Grenada | Annette | Richard Pottier (2) | |
| 1952 | The Case Against X | Inmate-manicure | Richard Pottier (3) | |
| 1952 | Rayés des vivants | Marcelle | Maurice Cloche | |
| 1952 | La chasse à l'homme | | Pierre Kast | Short |
| 1953 | A Caprice of Darling Caroline | Ida | Jean-Devaivre | |
| 1953 | Les Compagnes de la nuit | Ginette Bachelet | Ralph Habib | |
| 1953 | Les détectives du dimanche | Mme. Pelle | Claude Orval | |
| 1953 | Capitaine Pantoufle | Claire Bonavent | Guy Lefranc | |
| 1953 | Act of Love | The girl on the terrace | Anatole Litvak | |
| 1954 | Service Entrance | Hortense Van de Putte | Carlo Rim (2) | |
| 1954 | Scènes de ménage | Madame Boulingrin | André Berthomieu (3) | |
| 1954 | Obsession | Arlette Bernardin | Jean Delannoy | |
| 1955 | Casse-cou, mademoiselle! | Gisèle Evrard | Christian Stengel | |
| 1955 | Les évadés | François's wife | Jean-Paul Le Chanois | |
| 1955 | M'sieur la Caille | Bertha | André Pergament | |
| 1955 | Les salauds vont en enfer | Germaine | Robert Hossein | |
| 1956 | The Adventures of Gil Blas | Serafina | René Jolivet; Ricardo Muñoz Suay | |
| 1956 | La puce à l'oreille | Raymonde Chandebise | Stellio Lorenzi | TV Movie |
| 1957 | Burning Fuse | The innkeeper | Henri Decoin (2) | |
| 1957 | Élisa | Mme Clotilde | Roger Richebé | |
| 1957 | Explosice Vacation! | Marie | Christian Stengel (2) | |
| 1958 | Les femmes sont marrantes | Yolande | André Hunebelle | |
| 1958 | Mädchen in Uniform | Madame Aubert | Géza von Radványi | |
| 1958 | Le tombeur | Mme Amanda Lautier | René Delacroix | |
| 1959 | La prima notte | Antoinette Sophronides | Alberto Cavalcanti | |
| 1959 | Une nuit orageuse | | Marcel Bluwal | TV Movie |
| 1961 | Dans l'eau qui fait des bulles | Georgette Ernzer | Maurice Delbez | |
| 1962 | Système deux | | Marcel Cravenne | TV Movie |
| 1963 | Le bon roi Dagobert | Madame Pelletan / Gomatrude | Pierre Chevalier | |
| 1965 | Les enquiquineurs | Madame Hélène Eloy | Roland Quignon | |
| 1965 | Les saintes chéries | Fanny | Jean Becker; Maurice Delbez | TV Series (2 Episodes) |
| 1966 | Le train bleu s'arrête 13 fois | Mathilde | Émile Roussel | TV Series (1 Episode : "Antibes: coup fourré") |
| 1966 | L'anglais tel qu'on le parle | The hotel's manageress | Marcel Cravenne (2) | TV Movie |
| 1966 | Les saintes chéries | Fanny | Jean Becker (2); Maurice Delbez (2) | TV Series (2 Episodes) |
| 1966 | Au théâtre ce soir | Solange / Nicole Guise | Pierre Sabbagh | TV Series (2 Episodes) |
| 1967 | Les Cinq Dernières Minutes | Madame Jardin | Claude Loursais | TV Series (1 Episode : "Finir en beauté") |
| 1968 | Béru et ces dames | Madame Albertine | Guy Lefranc (2) | |
| 1968 | Au théâtre ce soir | Anne-Marie | Pierre Sabbagh (2) | TV Series (1 Episode : "Boléro") |
| 1969 | Aux frais de la princesse | Hélène | Roland Quignon (2) | |
| 1970 | Les saintes chéries | Fanny | Jean Becker (3); Nicole de Buron | TV Series (3 Episodes) |
| 1971 | Valparaiso, Valparaiso | The hostess | Pascal Aubier | |
| 1971 | La coqueluche | Marie-Blanche Turgan | Christian-Paul Arrighi | |
| 1973 | Au théâtre ce soir | Lucie Trévières | Georges Folgoas | TV Series (1 Episode : "Les quatre vérités") |
| 1974 | Arsène Lupin | Sophie | Jean-Pierre Desagnat | TV Series (1 Episode : "Le coffre-fort de madame Imbert") |
| 1974 | Au théâtre ce soir | Béatrice | Jean Royer | TV Series (1 Episode : "Le vison à cinq pattes") |
| 1975 | Au théâtre ce soir | Madeleine | Pierre Sabbagh (3) | TV Series (1 Episode : "Ah! La police de papa!") |
| 1977 | Blue jeans | Jean-Luc's mother | Hugues Burin des Roziers | |
| 1977 | Au théâtre ce soir | Éva / Henriette | Pierre Sabbagh (4) | TV Series (2 Episodes) |
| 1978 | Once in Paris... | Jean-Paul's Wife | Frank D. Gilroy | |
| 1979 | L'hôtel du libre-échange | Angélique | Guy Séligmann | TV Movie |
| 1980 | Au théâtre ce soir | Several | Pierre Sabbagh (5) | TV Series (1 Episode : "La chambre mandarine") |
| 1981 | La puce et le privé | Odette Rupert | Roger Kay | |
| 1981 | Les amours des années folles | The Countess | Dominique Giuliani | TV Series (1 Episode : "Molinoff, Indre-et-Loire") |
| 1981 | Les folies d'Élodie | Juliette | André Génovès | |
| 1981 | Belles, blondes et bronzées | The nun | Max Pécas | |
| 1982 | Te marre pas... c'est pour rire! | Agathe Frémont | Jacques Besnard | |
| 1982 | Emmenez-moi au théâtre: Lorsque l'enfant paraît | Olympe Jacquet | Guy Séligmann (2) | TV Movie |
| 1983 | Le Braconnier de Dieu | The hotelkeeper | Jean-Pierre Darras | |
| 1983 | Marianne, une étoile pour Napoléon | Adélaïde | Marion Sarraut | TV Series |
| 1984 | Diable d'homme! | Gilberte | Georges Folgoas (2) | TV Movie |
| 1985 | Brigade verte | Mme Pechinpah | Gilles Grangier (2) | TV Series (1 Episode : "Thermotel") |
| 1987 | Madame le maire | Olympe | Jean-François Claire | TV Series |
| 1988 | The Camp at Thiaroye | | Ousmane Sembène; Thierno Faty Sow | |
| 1992 | La bonne Anna | Anna | Georges Folgoas (3) | TV Movie |
| 1993 | Le JAP, juge d'application des peines | | Josée Dayan | TV Series (1 Episode : "Tirez sur le lampiste") |
| 1993 | Soutien de famille | Mother | Christophe Jacrot | Short |
| 1996 | Les surprises du chef | Largentière's wife | André Flédérick | TV Movie |
| 2001 | Les aliénés | The mother | Yvan Gauthier | |
| 2003 | Le Squat | | Jean-Pierre Dravel; Olivier Macé; Jean-Philippe Viaud | TV Movie |
| 2012 | R.I.S, police scientifique | Aude Lantin | Thierry Bouteiller | TV Series (1 Episode : "Diamant bleu") |

== Awards ==
- In 1974, she was named Ordre des Arts et des Lettres.
- In 1989, she won the Molière Award of the Best Comic Show.
- In 2007, she was named Chevalier de la Légion d'honneur.

== Other ==
In 2011, she participated in Danse avec les stars (French version of Dancing with the Stars) and in the Balajo's anniversary, the famous night-club rue de Lappe in Paris. She participated aged 82 years old, which made her the oldest participant ever, to date, in the French version of Danse Avec Les Stars.

In April 2014, her daughter Véronique announced her mother's Alzheimer's disease.
