= Manon 70 =

1968 film by Jean Aurel

- French theatrical release poster
- Directed by: Jean Aurel
- Screenplay by: Jean Aurel; Cécil Saint-Laurent
- Based on: Manon Lescaut by Abbe Prevost
- Produced by: Robert Dorfmann; Yvon Guézel
- Starring: Catherine Deneuve; Elsa Martinelli; Sami Frey; Robert Webber; Paul Hubschmid; Jean-Claude Brialy
- Cinematography: Edmond Richard
- Edited by: Anne-Marie Cotret
- Music by: Serge Gainsbourg
- Production companies: Les Films Corona; Transinter Films; Roxy Films; Panda Films
- Distributed by: Valoria Films (France); CIDIF (Italy)
- Release dates: 21 February 1968 (France); 18 April 1968 (Italy); 17 May 1968 (West Germany)
- Running time: 105 minutes
- Countries: France; Italy; West Germany
- Language: French
- Box office: $3,253,380

Manon 70 is a 1968 drama film directed by Jean Aurel, and starring Catherine Deneuve, Elsa Martinelli, Sami Frey, Robert Webber, Paul Hubschmid and Jean-Claude Brialy. The screenplay by Aurel and Cécil Saint-Laurent is loosely based on the 1731 novel Manon Lescaut by Antoine François Prévost. The original music was composed by Serge Gainsbourg.

== Synopsis ==
Manon is an amoral, free spirit who uses sex to surround herself in relatively luxurious surroundings. Journalist François sees her at the airport and falls in love with her. Once they land in Paris, he makes his move and steals her from the man she has been traveling with. François and Manon fall in love but Manon's brother, wants to live off his sister and causes trouble. Manon tries seeing a wealthy man at the same time as François.

== Cast ==
- Catherine Deneuve as Manon
- Jean-Claude Brialy as Jean-Paul
- Sami Frey as François Des Grieux
- Elsa Martinelli as Annie
- Robert Webber as Ravaggi
- Paul Hubschmid as Simon
- Claude Génia as wife
- Jean Martin as hotel manager

== Reception ==
Deneuve later said she wanted to work with Jean Aurel because she admired his film All About Loving (1964). Of Manon 70, she said, "The story was great but, in the end, [the film] just missed."
