= 14-18 =

1963 film

- Film poster
- Directed by: Jean Aurel
- Written by: Jacques Laurent (aka Cecil Saint-Laurent)
- Produced by: Jean Aurel
- Edited by: Anne-Marie Cotret
- Distributed by: Rank
- Release date: 1963
- Running time: 90 minutes
- Country: France
- Language: French

14-18 (also known as Over There, 1914-18) is a 1963 French documentary film about World War I, directed by Jean Aurel.

Pathé-Contemporary Films syndicated 14-18 to RKO General's television stations. 14-18 was then nominated for an Academy Award for Best Documentary Feature. After its nomination, Pathé-Contemporary released 14-18 in theaters in the United States in 1965.
