= Manuela (1957 film) =

British drama by Guy Hamilton

Manuela (UK) Stowaway Girl (US)
- Film poster
- Directed by: Guy Hamilton
- Written by: Guy Hamilton; Ivan Foxwell; William Woods
- Produced by: Ivan Foxwell
- Starring: Trevor Howard; Elsa Martinelli
- Cinematography: Otto Heller
- Edited by: Alan Osbiston
- Music by: William Alwyn
- Production company: Ivan Foxwell Productions
- Distributed by: Paramount Pictures
- Release date: June 1957
- Running time: 87 minutes
- Country: United Kingdom
- Language: English

Manuela (U.S. title: Stowaway Girl ) is a 1957 British drama film directed by Guy Hamilton, starring Trevor Howard and Elsa Martinelli. It was written by Hamilton, Ivan Foxwell and William Woods.

== Plot ==
James Prothero is the jaded, alcoholic, disillusioned captain of a ship due to leave South America for England. He falls for Manuela, a young Spanish girl smuggled aboard by the ship's first mate. His infatuation leads to the loss of the ship. Realising he has no future with Manuela, he returns to sea alone. In an alternate ending, after being admonished by his shipmate Mario, the Captain reconsiders his decision to abandon Manuela. As he's leaving town with Mario, he stops and turns about face and enters the village. Leaving Mario outside the square, the Captain goes into the bar to find Manuela.

== Cast ==
- Trevor Howard as James Prothero
- Elsa Martinelli as Manuela Hunt
- Pedro Armendáriz as Mario Constanza
- Donald Pleasence as Evans
- Warren Mitchell as Moss
- Jack MacGowran as Tommy
- Leslie Weston as Bleloch
- Harcourt Curacao as Wellington Jones
- Barry Lowe as Murphy
- Juan Carolilla as official
- John Rae as Ferguson
- Roger Delgado as stranger
- Harold Kasket as Pereira
- Max Butterfield as Bliss
- Andy Ho as cook
- Peter Illing as agent
- Armand Guinle as patron
- Michael Peake as Coca-Cola man
- Ali Allen as boy (uncredited)
- Christopher Lee as voice of Wellington Jones (uncredited)

== Critical response ==
The Monthly Film Bulletin wrote: "[But it is] on the whole an unsatisfying film, with its sum inferior to its parts, with disparate elements which somehow do not come together. This is due in large measure to the casting, with its obvious eye to the international market. Trevor Howard gives a finely-tempered performance as the middle-aged, alcoholic master, an almost Conradian character; but here, as in Outcast of the Islands [1952], he cannot succeed in conveying the illusion of an all-consuming passion, upon which the story of Manuela also hangs. Beside Elsa Martinelli's weakly inadequate lost waif, much of the power of Howard's acting is lost and it appears to be projected in vacuo. ... Otto Heller's camerawork is particularly fine, giving the film a visual quality which ultimately serves to expose a lack of distinction elsewhere."

The Radio Times Guide to Films gave the film 2/5 stars, writing: "This unlikely shipboard romance was later gently lampooned in Carry On Jack [1964]. Director Guy Hamilton does a fair job of reining in Trevor Howard's natural bullishness, coming as close as anyone ever did to discovering vulnerability in his gruff make-up. Elsa Martinelli never really convinces in her boyish disguise, but it's clear to see why tipsy Captain Howard would fall for her. This frippery is beneath the cast, but it still has an easy charm."

Leslie Halliwell said: "Downbeat seafaring malodrama, fine for those seeking a mood piece."

In British Sound Films: The Studio Years 1928–1959 David Quinlan rated the film as "good", writing: "Overall quite powerful romantic drama somewhat after Joseph Conrad in tone."

== Accolades ==
The film was entered into the 7th Berlin International Film Festival.
