= Irving Malin =

American literary critic (1934–2014)

Irving Malin (March 18, 1934 – December 3, 2014) was an American literary critic. Malin attended Thomas Jefferson High School and Jamaica High School and graduated magna cum laude from Queens College in 1955 and received his PhD from Stanford University in 1958. He married Ruth Lief in 1955 and they remained married until his death. He taught at the City College of New York from 1960 until his retirement in 1996. Malin did his dissertation (later published just a book by Stanford University Press) on the fiction of William Faulkner and made his initial academic mark as a critic of American Jewish Literature, editing an early collection on the fiction of Saul Bellow as well as a critical book and a general anthology on Jewish literature in the US. He subsequently became interested in writers who practiced innovative techniques such as James Purdy and John Hawkes as well as writers who broke down the boundaries between fiction and nonfiction such as William Styron and Truman Capote. One of the pioneering academics to take an interest in metafiction and experimental writing, Malin was an early contributor to the Review of Contemporary Fiction, writing over five hundred book reviews for this and other publications (like the Hollins Critic). In the latter portion of his career, Malin edited many anthologies of essays, including books on Henry James, Thomas Pynchon, William Goyen, George Garrett, Don DeLillo, Vladimir Nabokov, Leslie Fiedler, and William Gass. He was a fellow at Yaddo and the Huntington Library and served on many boards and award panels. Malin died December 3, 2014.

== Books ==
- William Faulkner: An Interpretation. Stanford University Press, 1957
- New American Gothic. Southern Illinois University Press, 1962
- Jews and Americans. Southern Illinois University Press, 1965
- Psychoanalysis and American Fiction. Dutton, 1965
- Saul Bellow and the Critics. New York University Press, 1967
- Saul Bellow's Fiction. Southern Illinois University Press, 1969
- Nathanael West's Novels. Southern Illinois University Press, 1972
