= Safe Conduct =

2002 film

- film poster
- French: Laissez-passer
- Directed by: Bertrand Tavernier
- Written by: Bertrand Tavernier; Jean Cosmos
- Produced by: Frédéric Bourboulon; Alain Sarde
- Starring: Jacques Gamblin; Denis Podalydès
- Cinematography: Alain Choquart
- Edited by: Sophie Brunet
- Music by: Antoine Duhamel
- Production companies: France 2 Cinéma; France 3 Cinéma
- Distributed by: BAC Films
- Release date: 9 January 2002
- Running time: 170 minutes
- Country: France
- Language: French
- Budget: $18.5 million
- Box office: $1.7 million

Safe Conduct (French: Laissez-passer) is a 2002 French historical drama film directed by Bertrand Tavernier and written by Tavernier and Jean Cosmos. It is based on the memories of the veteran French director Jean Devaivre, active in the film industry and the resistance during the Second World War.

== Plot ==
The film concerns the French film industry from 1942 to 1944 during the Nazi occupation. The film focuses on assistant director and resistance fighter Jean Devaivre and screenwriter Jean Aurenche.

Devaivre works for the German production company Continental Films, where he is respected. However, he is involved in dangerous resistance activity.

Aurenche keeps moving locations so that he does not have to write anything collaborationist. On the other hand, Aurenche's scriptwriting does not help how he lives and he is a womanizer which causes him to procrastinate.

== Cast ==
- Jacques Gamblin as Jean Devaivre
- Denis Podalydès as Jean Aurenche
- Charlotte Kady as Suzanne Raymond
- Christian Berkel as Dr. Greven
- Marie Gillain as Olga
- Olivier Gourmet as Roger Richebé
- Philippe Morier-Genoud as Maurice Tourneur
- Richard Sammel as Richard Pottier
- Liliane Rovère as Mémaine
- Serge Riaboukine as Louis Née
- Marie Desgranges as Simone Devaivre
- Ged Marlon as Jean-Paul Le Chanois
- Laurent Schilling as Charles Spaak
- Maria Pitarresi as Reine Sorignal
- Philippe Saïd as Pierre Nord
- Götz Burger as Bauermeister
- Henri Attal as Raoul
- Jacques Boudet as café owner
- Tim Pigott-Smith as Fleming

== Production ==
The film is based on French director Jean-Devaivre's memoirs. Bertrand Tavernier felt compelled to tell the story because of his interest in reviving films from 1942 to 1944 and because he has friendships with key figures from those films. Principle filming began November 6, 2000.

== Court case ==
The real life Devaivre sued director Tavernier because he wanted his name bigger than Aurenche's in the credits. Tavernier's opponents, including Cahiers du Cinéma and Le Monde, attacked him because they thought that he was attacking the French New Wave when he portrayed the characters of Aurenche and Bost in a positive light. Tavernier thought that it was crazy that they were attacking him and pointed out that he had worked with Jean-Luc Godard, Claude Chabrol, Agnès Varda, and Jacques Demy and did not oppose any of their works. French critics thought that the film supports passitivity and collaboration as well as appealing to the conservative elements of French film-making.

In January 2002, a Paris court ruled that Tavernier was required to rewrite the screen credits to ensure full acknowledgement be given to Jean Devaivre, who in his lawsuit claimed Tavernier duped him for commercial reasons. Devaivre had accused Tavernier of twisting the truth, and demanded the film to be withdrawn from distribution after claiming that Tavernier "deceived, robbed and betrayed artistic creation and my friendship for commercial reasons". In return Tavernier implied that the quarrel was about money, rather than truth, commenting "The man whom he called 'my hero' had at first refused any payment, but his family later demanded both recompense and acknowledgement that the work was inspired by the autobiography". Judge Francis Delphin said that Laissez-passer could not go on the festival circuit without recognition of Devaivre's contribution.

== Reception ==
The film gained 75% on Rotten Tomatoes out of 36 reviews with the consensus "A highly detailed, exciting historical epic."

Roger Ebert gave the film a positive review and 4 out of 4 stars. Kent Turner of Film-Forward said that the acting is unfocused because the acting is understated and appears in many moments to be improvisational. Jürgen Fauth, of About.com, said that Tavernier has woven a rich tapestry that never hits the dramatic high point, the life-and-death crisis that Hollywood has trained us to expect, but that the film still satisfies through its continually compelling surface, the kaleidoscopic scope of its attention, the large and small stories it tells. Holly E. Ordway, of DVD Talk, said that the film will probably be enjoyed by devotees of French cinema who are well-versed in the history of the art, but that it's not worth watching for anyone else.

Lisa Besselson of Variety felt that the film could have offered a greater insight into French film industry during a complex historical era. While noting that some of the best-handled content did not appear until 2 hours into the film, what was perceived as an unnecessary length detracted. She predicted the film "will reap the movie plenty of attention and elicit praise from French crix and essayists".

In reviewing the top 10 films of 2002, David Parkinson of The Oxford Times wrote that with the Vichy France era still considered a taboo topic in that country, it was not surprising that Laissez-passer "would inflame passions". He further noted that by Tavernier including names of films and film-makers that would have little historical significance to scholars, the film was a missed opportunity that "only fleetingly captures the atmosphere of suspicion and repression that existed on the studio floor or the impact the resulting pictures made on the populace".

== Awards ==
Jacques Gamblin won the Silver Bear for Best Actor and Antoine Duhamel won Best Original Score at the Berlin International Film Festival both in 2001 and 2002. Emile Ghigo was nominated for Best Production Design and Antoine Duhamel was nominated for Best Original Score at the French Academy of Cinema. Bertrand Tavernier won Best Director, Best Film, and Best Screenplay at the Ft. Lauderdale International Film Festival.

== Film festivals ==
- New York Film Festival
- City of Lights, City of Angels Festival
- Berlin Film Festival
- Ft. Lauderdale International Film Festival
- LA French Film Festival

== DVD release ==
The R1 DVD has a 2.35:1 picture and Dolby Digital 2.0 soundtrack in French and English. The special features include a theatrical trailer & a text only interview with the director. The PAL R2 UK dvd includes a 48 min. director's interview. The two disc PAL R2 French release features a director's commentary, a making of doc, and 8 deleted scenes. Note that the French release is not English subtitled.
