= Rampage (1963 film) =

1963 adventure film directed by Phil Karlson

- Original film poster by Frank McCarthy
- Directed by: Phil Karlson
- Screenplay by: Robert I. Holt and Marguerite Roberts; Jerome Bixby (uncredited)
- Based on: a novel by Alan Caillou
- Produced by: William Fadiman
- Starring: Robert Mitchum; Elsa Martinelli; Jack Hawkins; Sabu
- Cinematography: Harold Lipstein A.S.C.
- Edited by: Gene Milford
- Music by: Elmer Bernstein
- Production companies: A Seven Arts Production; Talbot Productions, Inc.
- Distributed by: Warner Bros. Pictures
- Release date: October 9, 1963
- Running time: 98 minutes
- Country: United States
- Language: English

Rampage is a 1963 American adventure film starring Robert Mitchum, Elsa Martinelli and Jack Hawkins. Directed by Phil Karlson, it was based on the 1961 novel of the same name by Alan Caillou. The film features a musical score by Elmer Bernstein.

== Plot ==
"Wilhelm Zoo Germany" A British big game trophy hunter, Otto Abbot, is offered a job by a West German zoo to capture a pair of Malay tigers and a rare leopard-tiger hybrid known as "the Enchantress". He recruits one of the world's top trappers for the job, American Harry Stanton. Abbot intends to bring along his longtime young mistress, Ana, an Italian waif whom he has kept as a ward since she was 14.

A rivalry over Ana breaks out between the men. Abbot also begs a rivalry over who is a better "man", the hunter or the trapper, he or Stanton.

Arriving at a destination where they are to recruit an army of beaters to drive the cats into nets, they find the locals uncooperative. Stanton overrules a confrontational Abbot and wins the native chieftain over with a promise that no guns will be used. The truce lasts until the two tigers are captured, with Abbot violating it with an overzealous shot to scare a third tiger off. The trio are left with only a small handful of helpers.

They track the Enchantress to a cave on a mountain top. While Stanton organizes a plan to drive it out an exit hole on the far end, Abbot seeks to prove himself still man enough to hang onto Ana and rashly goes in with a torch. He is mauled and saved by Stanton, who then completes the job.

There is more head-butting between the men on the way home, aggravated by Ana appearing to lean towards Stanton. On a train nearing their destination in Germany, she tells Abbot she's through with him. Abbot boils over and releases the big cat from its cage in a freight car, leaving Stanton trapped inside with it. Stanton survives, but the big cat leaps from the train upon arrival. An enormous police dragnet is deployed to capture it.

The cat is tracked atop a high building. Both Abbot and Ana are armed with hunting rifles. Abbot seeks to shoot Stanton instead but is mauled to death by the cat, which is slain by Ana. Stanton proposes to Ana - by offering her a "marry-cloth" used to betroth Malay women. She accepts.

== Cast ==
- Robert Mitchum as Harry Stanton
- Elsa Martinelli as Anna
- Jack Hawkins as Otto Abbot
- Sabu as Talib
- Cely Carrillo as Chep
- Emile Genest as Schelling
- Stefan Schnabel as Sakai Chief
- David Cadiente as Baka
- Sylva Koscina as stewardess (uncredited)

== Song ==
- "Rampage"
  lyrics by Mack David • music by Elmer Bernstein

== Production ==
Filming started in Hawaii in October 1962.
