= Bad Girls Don't Cry =

1959 film

- Directed by: Mauro Bolognini
- Written by: Pier Paolo Pasolini; Jacques-Laurent Bost
- Starring: Laurent Terzieff
- Cinematography: Armando Nannuzzi
- Edited by: Nino Baragli
- Music by: Piero Piccioni
- Release date: 1959
- Country: Italy
- Language: Italian

Bad Girls Don't Cry (Italian: La notte brava, also known as The Big Night, Night Heat, and On Any Street) is a 1959 Italian drama film directed by Mauro Bolognini. The film represents the debut of Tomas Milian in the Italian film industry.

== Plot ==
La notte brava is a socially conscious drama about the exploits of three young Roman hoodlums. They spend the day on petty crime and end it in a rendezvous with three streetwalkers. After taking their pleasure, the men try to cheat the women out of their money; the women outsmart them. That night the men go back into the city for further adventures. By dawn they have gone their separate ways, left only with loneliness and disgust.

Near the Baths of Caracalla, two boys from the Roman outskirts, Scintillone and Ruggeretto, pick up two young prostitutes, Anna and Supplizia, who have been quarrelling over turf. The boys want the girls in the car so they will look less suspicious to the police while they try to sell some stolen rifles. At the house of the fence Mosciarella they find him occupied with his sister’s funeral. At a loss, they accept an offer from the fence’s nephew, Gino, nicknamed Er Bella Bella: for a cut he will get rid of the goods.

Gino’s contact, however, is in no position to help. The two girls, who have realised why they were picked up, suggest going to Fiumicino, where another fence, Frustoni the deaf-mute, can be found. Once there, with the help of Nicoletta, a third prostitute known to Anna and Supplizia, the deal is done. On the way back to Rome the three couples pull off a country road to “celebrate.” When the fun is over the boys drive off, leaving the girls stranded, and start arguing over how to split the money. Only then do they discover that Anna, as wary as her companions, has stolen Scintillone’s wallet.

They race back, but the girls have vanished. Still hoping, they return to Caracalla for information; the other prostitutes will not talk. Spotting an unattended car, they try to steal a radio left on the seat and are caught by the owners—three well-off young Romans: Achille, known as Moretto, Pepito, and a third companion. A fight starts and is immediately broken up by the police. The three richer boys take the three outsiders away, ostensibly to get them out of trouble, but actually to an isolated spot where they mean to settle the score.

Once there, the group decides not to fight and to spend the evening together instead. After a stop at a bar they pass through the Caracalla district again and meet Nicoletta. Finding that she has no money and that Anna and Supplizia have abandoned her, they take it out on her by dumping rubbish and water from flower vases over her. Later they donate blood at a mobile centre and then go to Achille’s house to freshen up. Achille shows a hinted sexual ambiguity, already suggested by the way he had caressed a boy in the meadow where the fight was supposed to take place. Ruggero, meanwhile, makes the acquaintance of Laura, a pretty blonde who first pretends to be Achille’s sister and then admits she works as a servant in the rich household.

Gino “calls the others to order,” slips away after stealing a wallet, and, when it comes time to divide the take, means to keep all of it—about 100,000 lire. Ruggero wants to return the stolen goods so as not to ruin any chance of seeing Laura again. While Ruggero and Gino fight, Scintillone drives off in a taxi with the wallet. In Torpignattara he looks for Rossana, a girl he once courted, and learns that she too now lives by her wits, encouraged by her boyfriend Eliseo. He finds her in a dance hall. Eliseo is there as well, but she ditches him to leave with Scintillone. They go to an elegant restaurant near the Tarpeian Rock; Scintillone is first thrown out because of his past record and then handed over to the police.

Rossana picks up the money Scintillone left behind, but Ruggero arrives and forces her to hand over the loot, then invites her to spend the rest of the night with him. They move from club to club until they reach a restaurant that has already closed; a generous tip to the maître d’ and the orchestra gets it reopened. There Ruggero confides that he wants to change his life and even raises the prospect of marriage; he is met with her cynicism. The evening still ends on a romantic note: long kisses in the taxi on the way back, and a bunch of wild roses picked along the road.

After a brief goodbye Ruggero is left alone in the taxi that takes him back to the slum. He spends his last money on the fare. At the end of the “big night” he has only 1,000 lire left in his jacket pocket. As if to throw away something that no longer belongs to him and that he no longer wants, he smiles and tosses the notes from a little bridge.

== Cast ==
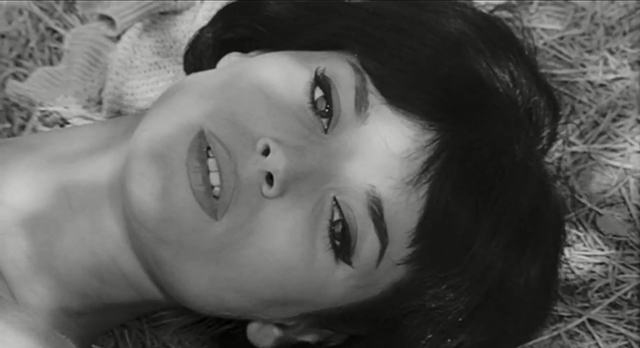
Elsa Martinelli Bad Girls Don't Cry

- Laurent Terzieff: Ruggeretto
- Jean-Claude Brialy: Scintillone
- Franco Interlenghi: Gino aka Bella-Bella
- Tomas Milian: Achille
- Rosanna Schiaffino: Rossana
- Elsa Martinelli: Anna
- Anna Maria Ferrero: Nicoletta
- Antonella Lualdi: Supplizia
- Mylène Demongeot: Laura

== Censorship ==
When La Notte Brava was first released in Italy in 1959 the Committee for the Theatrical Review of the Italian Ministry of Cultural Heritage and Activities rated it as VM16: not suitable for children under 16. In addition, the committee imposed the removal of the following scenes: 1) the scene in which Anna, next to Scintillone, is displayed lying on the ground with her legs uncovered and indecently apart; 2) the scene in which Ruggeretto uncovers the maid who is lying in bed. As a consequence she shows her naked back all the way down to almost her gluteus which are covered only by light panties; 3) the scene in which Ruggeretto and the maid, hugging each other, roll on the ground; 4) the scene in which Ruggerretto and the maid are dancing, tightly hugged, and are engaging in a long, endless kiss. Age restriction was issued because of the embarrassing nature of the narration and because of the presence of several scenes considered to be inappropriate to the sensitivity of minors.
