= Hess: A Biography =

1971 biography of Rudolf Hess by Roger Manvell and Heinrich Fraenkel

- Cover of the first edition
- Author: Roger Manvell, Heinrich Fraenkel
- Language: English
- Subject: Rudolf Hess
- Published: 1971
- Publication place: United Kingdom
- Pages: 256
- ISBN: 0-87749-428-2

Hess: A Biography is a 1971 biography of Rudolf Hess by Roger Manvell and Heinrich Fraenkel, published by MacGibbon and Kee (London) in 1971 as a 256-page hardcover. Drake Publishers (New York) republished it in 1973.

In the introduction, the authors state their aim to "be as objective as possible" about Hess, discuss the politics of his incarceration at Spandau, and state their belief that the "time for mere hot-blooded vengeance has long passed, and that for simple, human justice came long ago. Hess should be released."
