= Jacques Dacqmine =

French actor

- Born: 30 November 1923; La Madeleine, Nord, France
- Died: 29 March 2010 (aged 86); Caen, France
- Occupation: Actor
- Years active: 1941-2003 (film & TV)

Jacques Dacqmine (1923–2010) was a French stage, film and television actor. He was married four times, including to the actress Odile Versois.

== Partial filmography ==
- Premier rendez-vous (1941) - Un élève du collège (uncredited)
- The Queen's Necklace (1946) - Rétaux de Villette
- Back Streets of Paris (1946) - François
- The White Night (1948) - Jacques Davenne
- Dark Sunday (1948) - Jan Laszlo
- The Secret of Mayerling (1949) - L'Archiduc François-Ferdinand
- Julie de Carneilhan (1950) - Coco Votard
- Darling Caroline (1951) - Gaston de Sallanches
- A Caprice of Darling Caroline (1953) - Gaston de Sallanches
- Caroline and the Rebels (1955) - Général de Sallanches
- Les aristocrates (1955) - Arthus de Maubrun
- It Happened in Aden (1956) - Le major Burton
- Michel Strogoff (1956) - Le Grand-Duc
- Action immédiate (1957) - Walder
- Sylviane de mes nuits (1957) - Lucien
- Charming Boys (1957) - Charles
- La Belle et le Tzigane (1958) - Louis de Vintheuil
- The Road to Shame (1959) - Victor Quaglio
- Web of Passion (1959) - Henri Marcoux
- Classe Tous Risques (1960) - Blot
- Ravishing (1960) - Marc Cotteret
- The Nina B. Affair (1961) - Dr. Zorn
- Quai Notre-Dame (1961) - Lormoy
- The Game of Truth (1961) - Guillaume Geder
- Where the Truth Lies (1962) - Vial
- Il terrore dei mantelli rossi (1963) - Vladimir
- Le commissaire mène l'enquête (1963) - Gilbert (segment "Geste d'un fanatique")
- Francis Coplan (1964) - Le Vieux
- The Exterminators (1965) - Le 'Vieux'
- Phèdre (1968) - Thésée
- Victims of Vice (1978) - Le directeur de la P.J.
- The Missing Link (1980) - Récitant / Narrator (French version, voice)
- La crime (1983) - Me Antoine d'Alins
- La Piovra (1984)
- Inspecteur Lavardin (1986) - Raoul Mons
- Mélo (1986) - Dr. Remy
- Erreur de jeunesse (1989) - M. Monfort
- Nouvelle Vague (1990) - Le PDG
- L'Opération Corned-Beef (1991) - Le général Moulin
- Fortune Express (1991) - Pavlic (uncredited)
- Germinal (1993) - Philippe Hennebeau
- OcchioPinocchio (1994) - Police Chief
- White Lies (1998) - Maître Maillard
- The Dilettante (1999) - M. Delaunay
- The Ninth Gate (1999) - Old Man
- A Crime in Paradise (2001) - Le président Laborde
- Rien que du bonheur (2003) - Jean-Marie Bugues
- Adieu (2003) - Le médecin

== Bibliography ==
- Hayward, Susan. Simone Signoret: The Star as Cultural Sign. Continuum, 2004.
