= Mata Hari's Daughter =

1954 film directed by Carmine Gallone

- Directed by: Carmine Gallone
- Written by: Renzo Merusi; Piccini Vitali; Jean Aurel; Vittorio Nino Novarese; André Tabet
- Based on: Mata Hari's Daughter by Jacques Laurent
- Produced by: Albert Caraco; Giuseppe Tavazza
- Starring: Ludmilla Tchérina; Erno Crisa; Frank Latimore
- Cinematography: Alvaro Mancori; Gábor Pogány
- Edited by: Borys Lewin; Mario Serandrei
- Music by: Alessandro Casagrande
- Production companies: Cinefilms; Gamma Film
- Distributed by: Cinefilms; Gamma Film
- Release date: 23 September 1954
- Running time: 98 minutes
- Countries: France; Italy
- Language: Italian

Mata Hari's Daughter (Italian: La figlia di Mata Hari) is a 1954 French-Italian adventure film directed by Carmine Gallone and starring Ludmilla Tchérina, Erno Crisa and Frank Latimore. It is based on a novel of the same title by Jacques Laurent.

The film's sets were designed by the art director Virgilio Marchi.

== Cast ==
- Ludmilla Tchérina as Elyne
- Erno Crisa as Prince Anak
- Frank Latimore as Douglas Kent
- Milly Vitale as Angela
- Enzo Biliotti as Von Hopen
- Valéry Inkijinoff as Naos
- Valentine Olivieri as Zia Giulia
- Gian Paolo Rosmino as Colonello Stretten
- Henri Vidon as Il generale americano
- Guido Lauri as a ballet star
- Béatrice Arnac
- Mirela Horiuchi
- Bajoagin Haiopan

== Bibliography ==
- Chiti, Roberto & Poppi, Roberto. Dizionario del cinema italiano: Dal 1945 al 1959. Gremese Editore, 1991.
