= Mata Hari's Daughter (novel) =

Romantic novel by Jacques Laurent

- Author: Jacques Laurent
- Language: French
- Genre: Adventure
- Publication date: 1954
- Publication place: France
- Media type: Print

Mata Hari's Daughter (French: La Fille de Mata-Hari) is a romantic adventure novel by the French writer Jacques Laurent, under the pen name Cécil Saint-Laurent. It is in a similar style to his popular Chérie series of novels and features the daughter of the notorious First World War spy Mata Hari, who, like her mother, is a dancer who becomes embroiled in espionage.

Published in 1954, it was adapted into a French-Italian film Mata Hari's Daughter the same year.

== Bibliography ==
- Paul Mavis. The Espionage Filmography: United States Releases, 1898 Through 1999. McFarland, 2001.
