= Les Compagnes de la nuit =

1953 film]

- Directed by: Ralph Habib
- Written by: Paul Andréota; Jacques Companéez
- Produced by: Films Metzger et Woog
- Starring: Françoise Arnoul; Louis de Funès; Marthe Mercadier
- Music by: Raymond Legrand
- Distributed by: Les Films Corona
- Release date: 12 July 1953 (France)
- Running time: 90 minutes
- Country: France
- Language: French
- Box office: $24.8 million

Les Compagnes de la nuit (English: Companions of the Night), is a French drama film from 1953, directed by Ralph Habib, written by Paul Andréota, starring Françoise Arnoul and Louis de Funès.

== Synopsis ==
When a truck driver is murdered, a young woman is found dead after an acid attack, and another woman is killed in a hit-and-run, Inspector Maréchal is drawn into the dark world of a prostitution ring. A young single mother, Olga, a friend of the truck driver, reveals to him the grim realities behind the exploitation of women.

== Cast ==
- Françoise Arnoul : Olga Viterbo
- Raymond Pellegrin : Jo Verdier
- Nicole Maurey : Yvonne Leriche
- Noël Roquevert : the Smiling
- Marthe Mercadier : Ginette Bachelet
- Louis de Funès : a client
- Pierre Cressoy : Paul Gamelan
- Suzy Prim : Pierrette
- Jane Marken : Mrs Anita
- Christian Fourcade : Jackie Viterbo
- André Valmy : the inspector Maréchal
- Pierre Mondy : Sylvestre, campaign of Paul
- Huguette Montréal : Bella
