= Donatella (film) =

1956 film

- Film poster
- Directed by: Mario Monicelli
- Written by: Roberto Amoroso; Sandro Continenza; Ruggero Maccari; Mario Monicelli; Piero Tellini
- Produced by: Roberto Amoroso
- Starring: Elsa Martinelli
- Cinematography: Tonino Delli Colli
- Music by: Gino Filippini
- Distributed by: Variety Distribution
- Release date: 1956
- Running time: 103 minutes
- Country: Italy
- Language: Italian

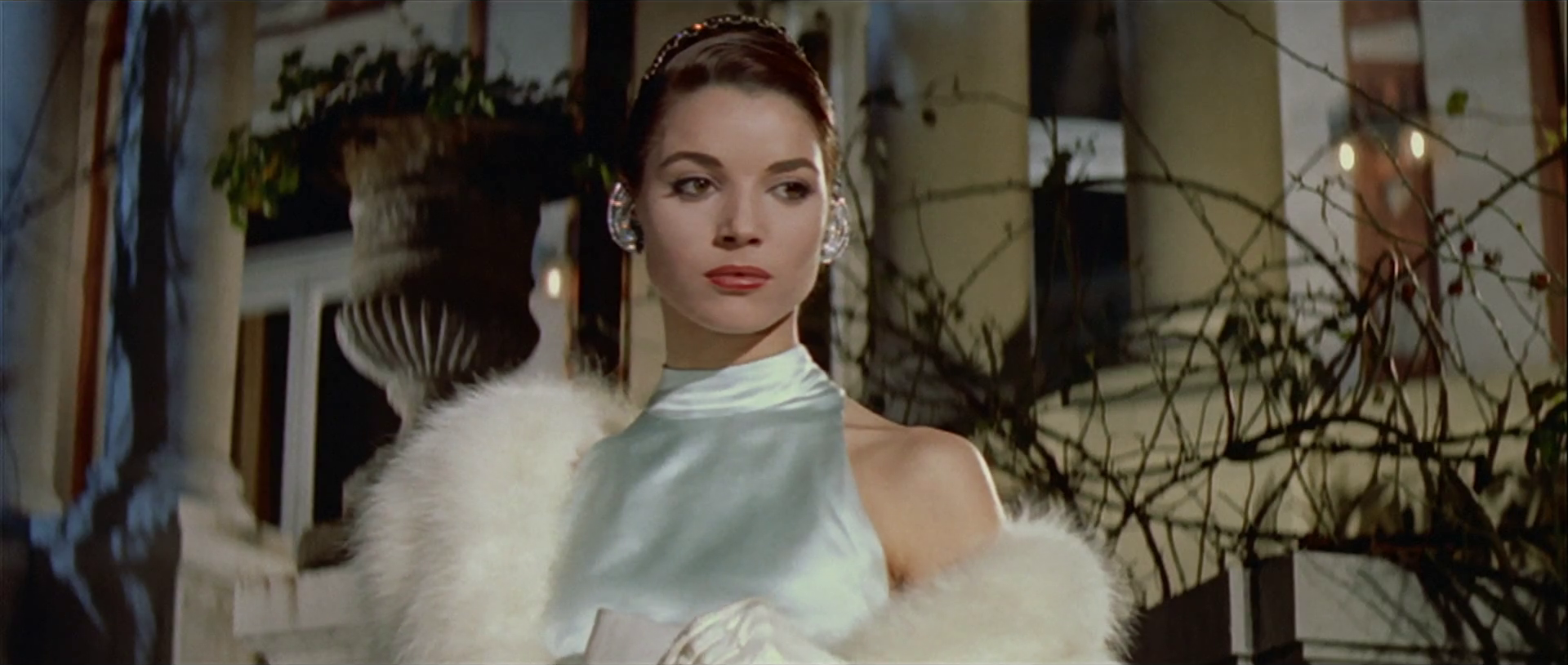
Elsa Martinelli as Donatella

Donatella is a 1956 Italian comedy film directed by Mario Monicelli. At the 6th Berlin International Film Festival, Elsa Martinelli won the Silver Bear for Best Actress.

== Plot ==
Donatella is a simple and honest Roman young girl; she is the daughter of a bookbinder and girlfriend of Guido's, a gas station owner. One day, she discovers a woman's handbag containing valuables and documents and decides to return it to its owner, a wealthy American lady who offers Donatella a job as a secretary as a reward; she has to manage the lady's villa during her absences, a job that does not require any particular commitment and allows Donatella to live for a while in the high society, unknown to her. Donatella casually meets Maurizio, a rich, elegant, and well-educated young man, and ends up falling in love. When Maurizio discovers the humble origins of Donatella, he thinks that she has deceived him, but then he is convinced of Donatella's good faith, and also to Guido's honesty, who acknowledges that he is not the right man for Donatella and agrees to leave her free, Donatella and Maurizio end up marrying.

== Cast ==
- Elsa Martinelli as Donatella
- Gabriele Ferzetti as Maurizio
- Walter Chiari as Guido
- Liliana Bonfatti as The veterinarian's nurse
- Alan Furlan as Giancarlo
- Virgilio Riento
- Giuseppe Porelli as Pasquale
- Giovanna Pala
- Aldo Fabrizi as Donatella's father
- Gaby André
- Xavier Cugat as himself
- Abbe Lane as herself
