= Elsa Martinelli =

Italian actress and fashion model (1935–2017)

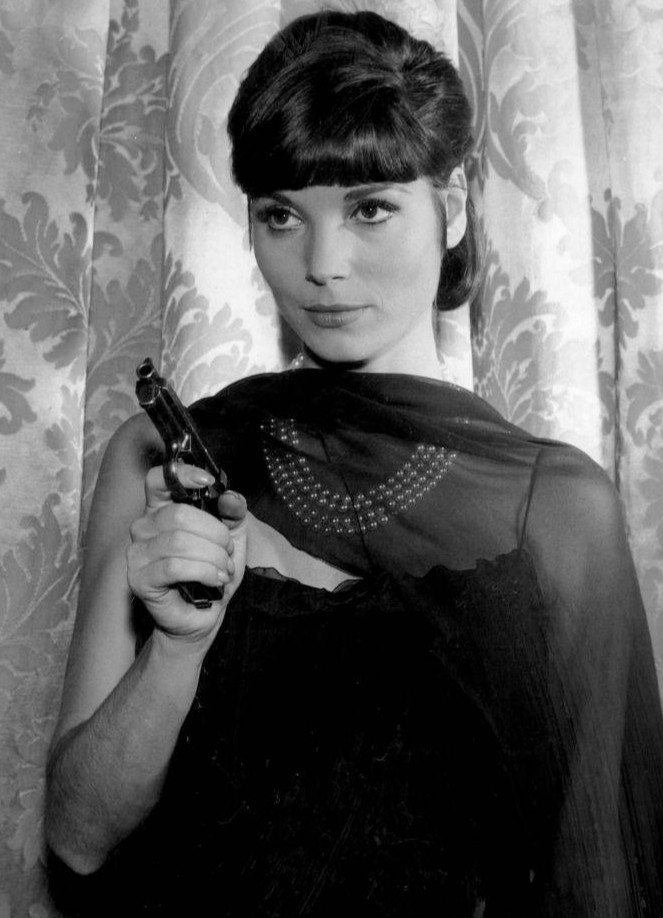
- Martinelli in the TV series The Rogues (1964)
- Born: Elisa Tia; 30 January 1935; Grosseto, Kingdom of Italy
- Died: 8 July 2017 (aged 82); Rome, Italy
- Occupations: Actress; model
- Years active: 1953–2005
- Spouses: Count Franco Mancinelli di San Vito (m. 1957–1960); Willy Rizzo (m. 1968–1978)
- Children: Cristiana Mancinelli

Elsa Martinelli (born Elisa Tia; 30 January 1935 – 8 July 2017) was an Italian actress and fashion model. Described by The Guardian as a "versatile star of Hollywood's international years whose work spanned romantic comedies, period epics, and spaghetti Westerns", she went on to star opposite Kirk Douglas, John Wayne, Robert Mitchum, Charlton Heston, and Anthony Quinn, and was directed by André De Toth, Vittorio De Sica, Howard Hawks, and Orson Welles on both sides of the Atlantic.

At the height of her career from the late 1950s into the late 1960s, she approached the popularity and status of top rival "Hollywood Italian imports" Sophia Loren, Gina Lollobrigida, and Claudia Cardinale. Her looks birthed the quip that she was a "kind of Audrey Hepburn with sex appeal". Outside her film career, Martinelli was a member of the glitterati, married to an Italian count, and befriended international celebrities such as Maria Callas, Aristotle Onassis, and Jackie Kennedy.

Martinelli made over 50 film appearances between 1954 and 1992.

== Life and career ==
Elsa Martinelli was born Elisa Tia in Grosseto, Tuscany, and moved to Rome with her family. In 1953, she was discovered by Roberto Capucci, who introduced her to the world of fashion. She became a model and began playing small roles in films, such as Le Rouge et le Noir (1954), but her first important film role came the following year in The Indian Fighter opposite Kirk Douglas, who claimed to have spotted her on a magazine cover and hired her for his production company, Bryna Productions. Douglas subsequently signed her to a two-year/two picture-a-year nonexclusive contract with Bryna Productions in February 1956.

Martinelli was then lent to Universal-International Pictures in March 1956 for the film Four Girls in Town. That same year, she won the Silver Bear for Best Actress at the 6th Berlin International Film Festival for playing the titular role in Mario Monicelli's Donatella.

From the mid-1950s through the late 1960s, Martinelli divided her time between Europe and the United States, earning major co-starring roles as the female lead in such Hollywood productions as Hatari! (1962, opposite John Wayne) and Rampage (1963, with Robert Mitchum). She appeared in many other films, including Manuela (1957), Bad Girls Don't Cry (a.k.a. La Notte Brava, 1959), Prisoner of the Volga (1959), Blood and Roses (1960), Love in Rome (a.k.a. Un amore a Roma, 1960), The Pigeon That Took Rome (1962), The Trial (1962), The V.I.P.s (1963), The 10th Victim (1965), Hail, Mafia (1965), Woman Times Seven (1967); and Candy (1968).

From the late 1960s onward, Martinelli's output decreased as she worked in mostly European foreign-language productions, such as Manon 70 (1968), One on Top of the Other (1969), and L'amica (1969—for which she won a Silver Ribbon for Best Supporting Actress). Her last English-language role was in Once Upon a Crime (1992). Her final acting appearance was in the 2005 European television series Orgoglio, as the Duchessa di Monteforte.

== Personal life ==
Martinelli married Count Franco Mancinelli Scotti di San Vito in 1957, by whom she had a daughter, Cristiana Mancinelli (born 1958), also an actress. They separated in 1960, but the official annulment was six years later. In 1968, she married another Italian living in France, Willy Rizzo, the Paris Match photographer and 1970s furniture designer. The marriage ended in divorce in 1978.

== Death ==
Martinelli died of cancer in Rome on 8 July 2017, at the age of 82.

== Filmography ==
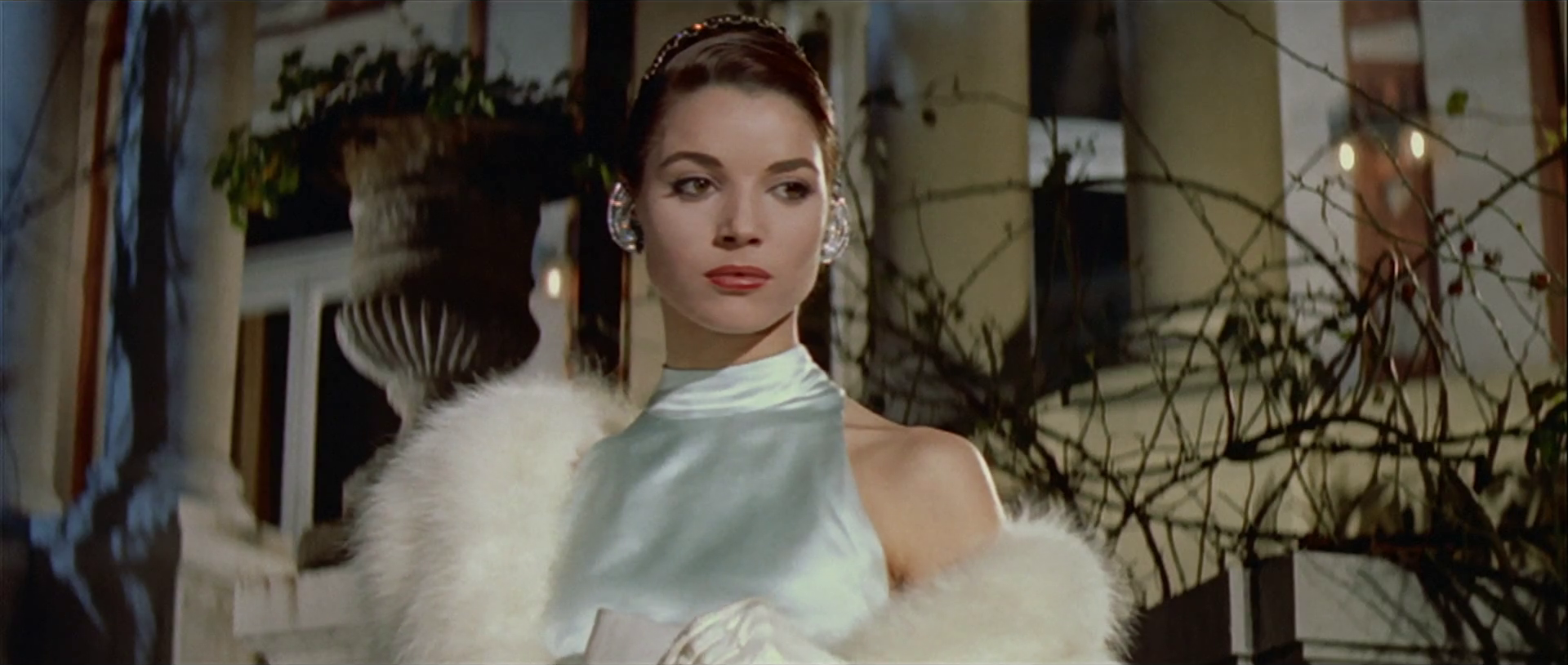
Martinelli in Donatella (1956)

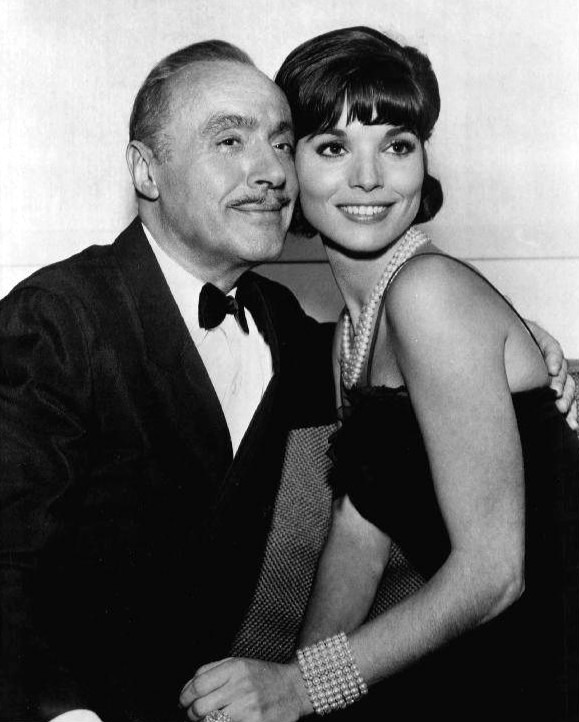
Charles Boyer and Elsa Martinelli in The Rogues, a U.S. television series. (1964)

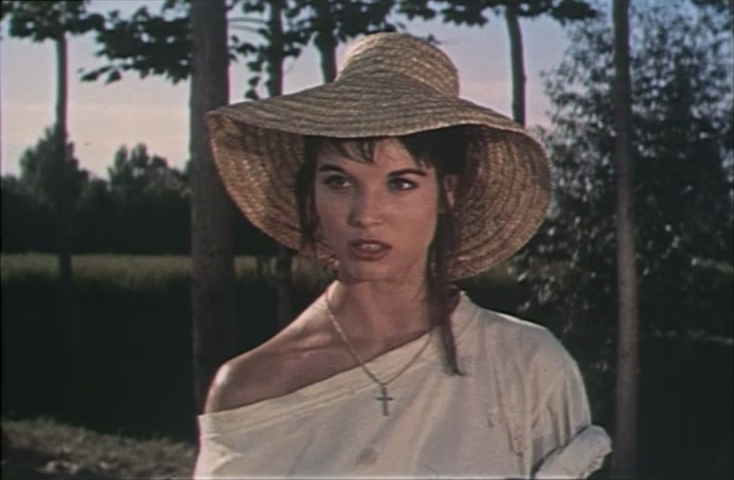
Martinelli in Rice Girl (1956)

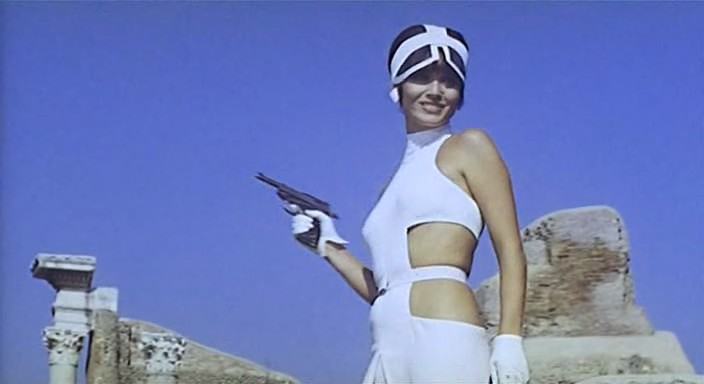
Martinelli in The 10th Victim (1965)

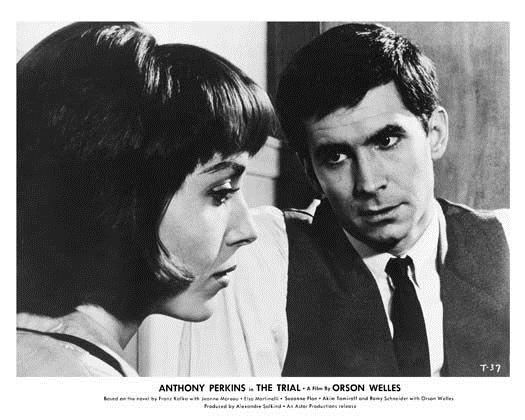
Martinelli in Orson Welles's The Trial with Anthony Perkins in 1963

- The Red and the Black (1954) (uncredited)
- If You Won a Hundred Million (1954) as Anna (segment "L'indossatrice")
- The Indian Fighter (1955) as Onahti
- Rice Girl (1956) as Elena Nardi
- Donatella (1956) as Donatella Guiscardi
- Four Girls in Town (1957) as Maria Antonelli
- Manuela (1957) as Manuela Hunt
- La mina (1958) as Lucia
- Prisoner of the Volga (1959) as Mascha
- Ciao, ciao bambina! (1959) as Diana
- Tunis Top Secret (1959) as Kathy Sands
- Wild Cats on the Beach (1959) as Doriana
- Bad Girls Don't Cry (1959) as Anna
- Call Girls of Rome (1960) as Marisa
- Blood and Roses (1960) as Georgia Monteverdi
- Il carro armato dell'8 settembre (1960) as Mirella
- Captain Blood (1960) as Gisèle d'Angoulême
- Love in Rome (1960) as Fulvia
- The Menace (1961) as Lucile
- Hatari! (1962) as Anna Maria 'Dallas' D'Allesandro
- The Pigeon That Took Rome (1962) as Antonella Massimo
- Pelle viva (1962) as Rosaria
- The Trial (1962) as Hilda
- The V.I.P.s (1963) as Gloria Gritti
- Rampage (1963) as Anna
- All About Loving (1964) as Mathilde
- Marco the Magnificent (1965) as The Woman with the Whip
- Je vous salue, mafia! (1965) as Sylvia
- Diamonds Are Brittle (1965) as Juliette
- The Duke's Gold (1965) as Sonia
- The 10th Victim (1965) as Olga
- How I Learned to Love Women (1966) as Monica the rallye driver
- Maroc 7 (1967) as Claudia
- The Oldest Profession (1967) as Domitilla (segment "Nuits romaines, Les")
- Woman Times Seven (1967) as Pretty woman (segment "Super Simone")
- Every Man Is My Enemy (1967) as Laureen
- Manon 70 (1968) as Annie
- The Belle Starr Story (1968) as Belle Starr
- Madigan's Millions (1968) as Vic Shaw
- Candy (1968) as Livia
- If It's Tuesday, This Must Be Belgium (1969) as Maria, Woman on Venetian bridge
- Maldonne (1969) as Gilberte de Baer
- Una sull'altra (1969) as Jane Bleeker
- The Pleasure Pit (1969) as Martine
- L'amica (1969) as Carla Nervi
- OSS 117 Takes a Vacation (1970) as Elsa
- La araucana (1971) as Inés de Suárez
- La Part des lions (1971) as Annie
- Il garofano rosso (film) (1976) as Zobeida
- I Am an ESP (1985) as Carla Razzi
- Pigmalione 88 (1988)
- Once Upon a Crime (1992) as Carla the Agent
