= Darling Caroline (1968 film) =

1968 film

- French poster
- Directed by: Denys de La Patellière
- Written by: Jacques Laurent
- Based on: Darling Caroline by Jacques Laurent
- Produced by: Jacques-Paul Bertrand; Alvaro Mancori
- Starring: France Anglade; Vittorio De Sica; Bernard Blier
- Cinematography: Sacha Vierny
- Edited by: Michèle Boëhm; Claude Durand
- Music by: Georges Garvarentz
- Production companies: Bercol Films; Chretien; Cineurop; Mancori Films; Norddeutsche Filmproduktion
- Distributed by: Constantin Film
- Release date: 18 January 1968
- Running time: 105 minutes
- Countries: France; Italy; West Germany
- Language: French

Darling Caroline (French: Caroline chérie) is a 1968 historical drama film directed by Denys de La Patellière and starring France Anglade, Vittorio De Sica and Bernard Blier. Made as a co-production between France, Italy and West Germany, it was based on the novel of the same title by Jacques Laurent which had previously been adapted into a film in 1951.

It was shot at the Epinay Studios near Paris. The film's sets were by the art director Jean André. The costumes were designed by Jacques Fonteray. It was shot in widescreen and Eastmancolor.

== Cast ==
- France Anglade as Caroline de Bièvre - une jolie aristocrate aux nombreuses aventures
- Vittorio De Sica as Le comte de Bièvre - le père de Caroline
- Bernard Blier as Georges Berthier
- Karin Dor as Isabelle de Loigny
- François Guérin as Gaston de Salanches
- Charles Aznavour as Jules, le Postillon
- Giorgio Albertazzi as Albencet, le géologiste
- Françoise Christophe as Madame Chabanne
- Gert Fröbe as Le docteur Belhomme
- Jean-Claude Brialy as Le comte de Boimussy
- François Chaumette as Van Kript I
- Valeria Ciangottini as Marie-Anne
- Jean-Pierre Darras as Van Kript II
- Roger Dumas as Clément, l'ancien jardinier du comte
- Isa Miranda as La duchesse de Bussez
- Jacques Monod as De Carilly, le docteur
- Sady Rebbot as L'homme enfermé avec Caroline
- Pierre Vernier as Bonaparte
- Béatrice Altariba as Une aristocrate chez Belhomme
- Henri Virlojeux as Le docteur Guillotin

== Bibliography ==
- Orio Caldiron & Matilde Hochkofler. Isa Miranda. Gremese Editore.
