= Carl N. Degler =

American historian (1921–2014)

- Born: Carl Neumann Degler; February 6, 1921; Newark, New Jersey, U.S.
- Died: December 27, 2014 (aged 93); Palo Alto, California, U.S.
- Awards: Pulitzer Prize for History (1972)

Academic background
- Education: Upsala College (BA); Columbia University (MA, PhD)
- Thesis: Labor in the Economy and Politics of New York City, 1850–1860: A Study of the Impact of Early Industrialism (1952)

Academic work
- Institutions: Vassar College; University of Oxford
- Notable works: Neither Black nor White (1971)

Carl Neumann Degler (February 6, 1921 – December 27, 2014) was an American historian and Pulitzer Prize-winning author. He was the Margaret Byrne Professor of American History Emeritus at Stanford University.

== Early life and education ==
Degler was born on February 6, 1921, in Newark, New Jersey. He served in the U.S. Army Air Force from 1942 to 1945. He earned a BA in history from Upsala College, and master's and doctoral degrees from Columbia University. His 1952 PhD dissertation in political science was "Labor in the Economy and Politics of New York City, 1850–1860: A Study of the Impact of Early Industrialism." It was never published as a whole, but several chapters became articles.

== Career ==
Degler taught history at Vassar College for 16 years (1952–1968). In 1968 he joined the Stanford faculty and taught there for the rest of his career, retiring as Emeritus Professor in 1990. In 1986 Degler was elected President of the American Historical Association. He also served as president of the Organization of American Historians and the Southern Historical Association.

In 1972 Degler was awarded the Pulitzer Prize for History for his book Neither Black nor White (1971), a work comparing slavery and race relations in Brazil and the United States. He earlier wrote Out of Our Past (1959), a study of United States history that was used in high school and college classrooms.

He has been described as "a scholarly champion of the common man and woman in American history" and as "a founding feminist". He was one of only two male founding members of the National Organization for Women.

In 1973–1974 he was the Harold Vyvyan Harmsworth Professor of American History at Oxford University. He was a member of both the American Academy of Arts and Sciences and the American Philosophical Society.

== Personal life ==
Degler was married to Catherine Grady, whom he met at Columbia, for nearly 50 years until her death. He was married to Teresa Baker Degler for the last 14 years of his life. He had two children and four grandchildren.

He died in Palo Alto, California, on December 27, 2014, at the age of 93.

== Bibliography ==
Degler's works include:

- "The Locofocos: Urban “Agrarians”." Journal of Economic History 16.3 (1956): 322-333. doi:10.1017/S0022050700059222
- Out of Our Past: The Forces That Shaped Modern America (1959)
- The Third American Revolution (1959)
- "Slavery and the genesis of American race prejudice." Comparative Studies in Society and History 2.1 (1959): 49-66.
- "American political parties and the rise of the city: An interpretation." Journal of American History 51.1 (1964): 41-59. JSTOR 1917933
- "Revolution without ideology: The changing place of women in America." Daedalus (1964): 653-670. JSTOR 20026849
- Affluence and Anxiety (1968)
- "Slavery in Brazil and the United States: An essay in comparative history." American Historical Review 75.4 (1970): 1004-1028.
- "Black and white together: Bi-racial politics in the south." The Virginia Quarterly Review 47.3 (1971): 421-444. JSTOR 26443445
- Neither Black Nor White: Slavery and Race Relations in Brazil and the United States (1972)
- The Other South: Southern Dissenters in the Nineteenth Century (1974)
- Place Over Time: The Continuity of Southern Distinctiveness (1977)
- "Remaking American History." Journal of American History 67.1 (1980): 7-25. JSTOR 1900438
- "What the women's movement has done to American history." Soundings' (1981): 403-421. JSTOR 41167487
- At Odds: Women and the Family in America from the Revolution to the Present (1981)
- "Thesis, antithesis, synthesis: The South, the North, and the nation." Journal of Southern History 53.1 (1987): 3-18. JSTOR 2208624
- In Search of Human Nature: The Decline and Revival of Darwinism in American Social Thought (1991)
