= Neither Black nor White =

1971 history book by Carl N. Degler

Neither Black nor White: Slavery and Race Relations in Brazil and the United States
- Author: Carl N. Degler
- Genre: History
- Publisher: University of Wisconsin Press
- Publication date: 1971
- Publication place: United States
- Pages: 302
- Awards: Pulitzer Prize for History
- ISBN: 9780299109141

Neither Black nor White: Slavery and Race Relations in Brazil and the United States is a 1971 nonfiction book written by American author Carl N. Degler, published by University of Wisconsin Press, which contrasts racial attitudes in the United States and Brazil, arguing that Brazilian culture developed a more fluid idea of race than American culture did, which maintained sharp distinctions between "black" and "white." The book was awarded the 1972 Pulitzer Prize for History.
