= The Sacred Flame (1929 film) =

1929 film

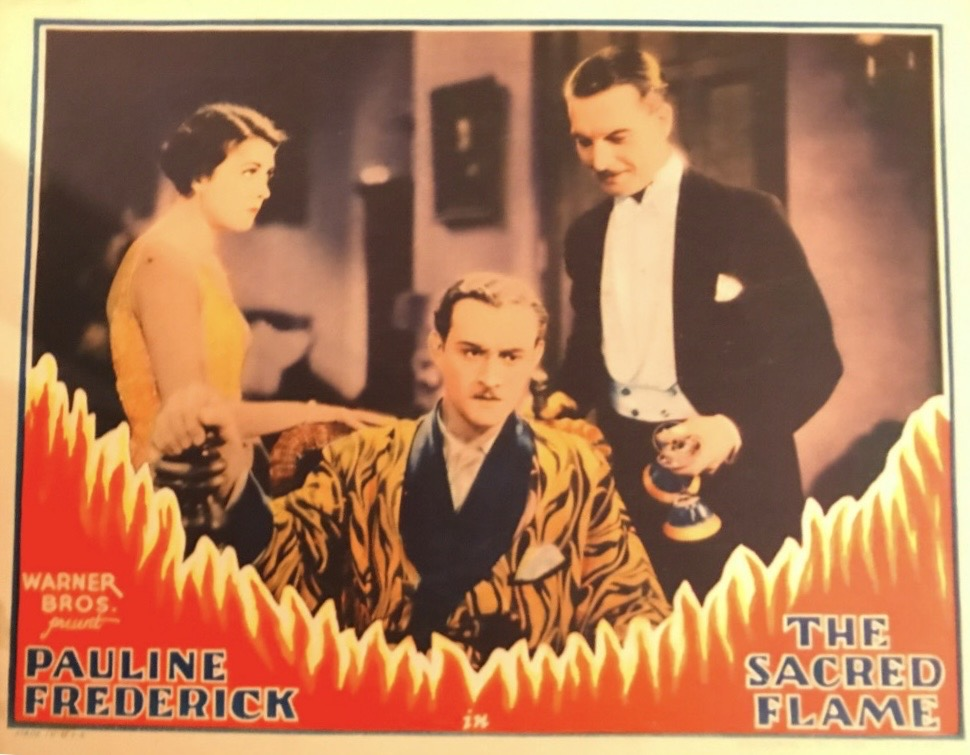
- Lobby Card
- Directed by: Archie Mayo
- Written by: Harvey F. Thew; De Leon Anthony
- Based on: The Sacred Flame by Somerset Maugham
- Starring: Pauline Frederick; Conrad Nagel; Lila Lee; William Courtenay
- Cinematography: James Van Trees
- Edited by: James Gibbon
- Production company: Warner Bros. Pictures
- Distributed by: Warner Bros. Pictures
- Release date: November 24, 1929
- Running time: 65 minutes
- Country: United States
- Language: English

The Sacred Flame is a 1929 American sound (All-Talking) romantic drama film directed by Archie Mayo, starring Pauline Frederick and Conrad Nagel, and based on a 1928 Broadway play of the same title by Somerset Maugham. It was considered a lost film until a three-second fragment was rediscovered on May 10, 2022. Two years later Warner Bros. Pictures remade the film in German The Sacred Flame. In 1935, a second remake The Right to Live, was made, starring Colin Clive and George Brent.

== Plot ==
At a fashionable London church wedding, Col. Maurice Taylor, a decorated Royal Flying Corps officer, marries Stella Elburn. Among the guests are his devoted mother, Mrs. Taylor; family friend Major Liconda; and the kindly Dr. Harvester. After a celebratory breakfast at the Taylor residence, the party travels to the Croydon Airdrome, where Maurice is preparing the airplane for the couple's honeymoon flight. Just after the guests arrive, a tragic accident occurs: the engine backfires, and Maurice is struck by the propeller, breaking his back and leaving him permanently paralyzed.

Over the next three years, Maurice finds solace in his deep love for Stella. Though he urges her to enjoy life beyond the confines of his sickroom, Stella chooses to remain by his side, offering comfort and companionship. Mrs. Taylor is deeply touched by Stella's loyalty and by the tireless care of Nurse Wayland, who tends to Maurice with quiet devotion.

The household is stirred by the return of Colin Taylor, Maurice's younger brother, after years abroad managing a plantation in South America. Maurice is delighted, especially as Colin's presence allows Stella an escape to concerts, dinners, and a social lifelong denied her. Over time, however, Stella and Colin fall deeply in love. They make a painful decision: they will elope. Mrs. Taylor, with her seasoned insight, sees what is happening but chooses to remain silent—though she is aware that the couple plans to leave together.

On the night before Colin's planned departure, Maurice confides in Stella, expressing sorrow that he has been unable to be a real husband to her and confessing that he often wished he had died in the crash. Devastated by his despair, Stella and Colin reconsider their decision and decide not to go through with it. Colin destroys the ticket he had purchased for Stella's escape.

The next morning, during breakfast, Nurse Wayland enters with shocking news: Maurice has died in the night. While Dr. Harvester prepares to certify the cause of death as heart failure, the nurse stuns him and Major Liconda by accusing someone in the household of murder. Consumed by her unspoken love for Maurice and bitterly resentful of Stella, Nurse Wayland believes his wife administered a lethal dose of sedatives. She threatens to go to the coroner unless an autopsy is ordered. Her suspicions only grow when Stella offers to send her on an extended trip to the Orient, which she takes as an attempt to silence her.

In front of the entire family, Wayland accuses Stella again, revealing that five sedative tablets—enough to kill—are missing from their bottle. Dr. Harvester acknowledges that the dose would have been fatal and confirms that Maurice could not have reached the medicine himself. Amid rising tension, Major Liconda makes a provocative suggestion: that whoever administered the dose should join Maurice in death by taking five tablets themselves. Shortly after, Stella removes the remaining pills and hands them to Liconda for safekeeping. When Colin later goes to dispose of the sedatives himself, he discovers they are already gone. Each now suspects the other of having committed the murder out of love and mercy.

In a climactic revelation, Mrs. Taylor admits she knew Stella had fallen in love with Colin—and that such feelings, though painful, were understandable in a healthy young woman. She recalls how, thirty years earlier, she herself had loved Major Liconda, but sacrificed her own happiness to preserve her marriage, only to later realize that time can temper even the deepest passions.

As Nurse Wayland insists on involving the coroner, Mrs. Taylor reveals a final truth: she, not Stella, was the last to see Maurice alive—and it was she who gave him the overdose. Years earlier, she had promised her son that if life ever became unbearable, she would help him end it. That night, after hearing Maurice's despair, she honored his request. Stunned by the selfless act, Nurse Wayland agrees to keep silent. She and Mrs. Taylor, two heartbroken women, find comfort in one another.

To spare Mrs. Taylor the pain of knowing Maurice died needlessly, Stella and Colin decide not to reveal that they had already abandoned their plans to run away. With quiet resolve, they begin preparing to sail to South America—together, but forever marked by the sacrifice that made their happiness possible.

== Cast ==
- Pauline Frederick as Mrs. Taylor
- Conrad Nagel as Colonel Maurice Taylor
- Lila Lee as Stella Taylor
- William Courtenay as Major Laconda
- Walter Byron as Colin Taylor
- Dale Fuller as Nurse Wayland
- Alec B. Francis as Dr. Harvester

== Music ==
The film featured a theme song entitled "The Sacred Flame" which was composed by Grant Clarke and Harry Akst. Conrad Nagel sings the song in the film. The song is played frequently as background music by the Vitaphone orchestra throughout the film.

== See also ==
- List of early sound feature films (1926–1929)

== Bibliography ==
- Goble, Alan. The Complete Index to Literary Sources in Film. Walter de Gruyter, 1999.
