= George Garrett (poet) =

Novelist, poet, short story writer, playwright

- Born: June 11, 1929; Orlando, Florida, U.S.
- Died: May 25, 2008 (aged 78); Charlottesville, Virginia, U.S.
- Education: The Hill School; Sewanee Military Academy; Princeton University (BA, MA, PhD); Columbia University
- Occupations: Poet, writer
- Writing career
- Genres: Poetry, theatre, fiction
- Notable work: Death of the Fox

George Palmer Garrett (June 11, 1929 – May 25, 2008) was an American poet and novelist. He was the Poet Laureate of Virginia from 2002 to 2004. His novels include The Finished Man, Double Vision, and the Elizabethan Trilogy, composed of Death of the Fox, The Succession, and Entered from the Sun. He worked as a book reviewer and screenwriter, and taught at Cambridge University and, for many years, at the University of Virginia. He is the subject of critical books by R. H. W. Dillard, Casey Clabough, and Irving Malin.

== Biography ==
George Palmer Garrett was born in Orlando, Florida on June 11, 1929. He attended The Hill School. He graduated from the Sewanee Military Academy in Sewanee, Tennessee, in 1945. He earned his BA from Princeton University in 1952, having matriculated in 1947 and having attended Columbia University in 1948–49. He also received his MA (1956) and PhD (1985) from Princeton.

Garrett served in the US Army (1946–47), and was stationed in Europe, in Leonding, Austria.

He began his teaching career as an assistant professor at Wesleyan University, Middletown, Connecticut (1957–60). After one year as a visiting lecturer at Rice University, he became associate professor of English at the University of Virginia, Charlottesville, where he taught for five years before accepting a post as professor of English at Hollins College (now University, Virginia, in 1967. In 1964–65 he was writer-in-residence at Princeton University. In 1971, he became professor of English and writer-in-residence at the University of South Carolina, Columbia, where he taught until 1973. From 1974 to 1977 he was senior fellow at the Council of the Humanities, Princeton University. He was then one year at Columbia University as adjunct professor (1977–78), one semester as writer-in-residence at Bennington College, Vermont, one semester at the Virginia Military Institute, and several years at the University of Michigan, Ann Arbor (1979–84). In 1984 Garrett was appointed Henry Hoyns Professor of English at the University of Virginia, the position in which he continued until his retirement in December 1999.

Garrett served a two-year term as president of the Associated Writing Programs (1971–73). A charter member of the Fellowship of Southern Writers, he was the organization's vice-chancellor (1987–93) and chancellor (1993–97). Over the years, he edited several magazines and book series. He was Contemporary Poetry Series editor at the University of North Carolina Press, Chapel Hill, 1962–68; and Short Story Series editor at the Louisiana State University Press, 1966–69. From 1958 to 1971 he was United States poetry editor for Transatlantic Review and, from 1965 to 1971 co-editor of Hollins Critic. He was a contributing editor for Contempora and assistant editor of The Film Journal. With Brendan Galvin he edited Poultry: A Magazine of Voice; and he was fiction editor at The Texas Review.

He is known for his Elizabethan trilogy, Death of the Fox, The Succession, and Entered from the Sun, a body of work that is so imbued with its subject matter and time as to create the sense that he lived through it all, and had total recall of life in the respective courts of Queen Elizabeth I and James I. Death of the Fox, the first of the books, raises questions about the nature of the form itself, and in fact all of Garrett's writing challenges the accepted ideas about the various forms in which he chose to work. The vast panorama of fictional and historical people that occupy the stage in the three novels is equaled by the beautifully drawn contemporary cast of characters in his other novels: the political novel The Finished Man; Do Lord, Remember Me; Which Ones Are the Enemy?; and The King of Babylon Shall Not Come Against You. Garrett never repeated himself, and the variety of his output has perhaps been a bit daunting to the critical establishment of his time, American critics tending to prefer their subjects to be rather one-noted, consistent and readily classified as to type, or theme, or treatment.

Garrett died at home in Charlottesville, Virginia, at the age of 78 of cancer. He had been diagnosed with cancer in 2006 after having suffered from myasthenia gravis for some years.

George Garrett's papers are housed in the Duke University Special Collections Library.

== Awards ==
- Sewanee Review fellowship (1958)
- American Academy in Rome fellowship (1958)
- Ford grant, for drama (1960)
- National Endowment for the Arts grant (1967)
- Contempora award (1971)
- Guggenheim Fellowship (1974)
- American Academy award (1985)
- New York Public Library Literary Lion award (1988)
- T. S. Eliot Award for Creative Writing (1989)
- PEN/Malamud Award for short fiction (1990)
- Aiken-Taylor Award (1999)
- Lifetime Achievement Award from the Library of Virginia (2004)
- Cleanth Brooks Medal for Lifetime Achievement from the Fellowship of Southern Writers (2005)
- Carole Weinstein Poetry Prize (2006)
- Thomas Wolfe Award (2006)

== Bibliography ==
=== Novels ===
- The Finished Man (1960)
- Which Ones Are the Enemy? (1962)
- Do, Lord, Remember Me (1965)
- Death of the Fox (1971)
- The Succession: A Novel of Elizabeth and James (1983)
- Poison Pen (1986)
- Entered from the Sun (1990)
- The Old Army Game: A Novel and Stories (1994)
- The King of Babylon Shall Not Come Against You (1996)
- The Elizabethan Trilogy (Death of the Fox, Entered from the Sun, and Succession) (1998)
- Double Vision (2004)

=== Short story collections ===
- King of the Mountain (1958)
- In the Briar Patch (1961)
- Cold Ground Was My Bed Last Night (1964)
- A Wreath for Garibaldi and Other Stories (1969)
- The Magic Striptease (1973)
- To Recollect a Cloud of Ghosts: Christmas in England (1979)
- An Evening Performance: New and Selected Short Stories (1985)
- Empty Bed Blues (2006)

=== Plays ===
- Sir Slob and the Princess: A Play for Children (1962)
- Garden Spot, U.S.A. (1962)
- Enchanted Ground (1981)

=== Poetry collections ===
- The Reverend Ghost (1957)
- The Sleeping Gypsy and Other Poems (1958)
- Abraham's Knife and Other Poems (1961)
- For a Bitter Season: New and Selected Poems (1967)
- Welcome to the Medicine Show: Postcards, Flashcards, Snapshots (1978)
- Luck's Shining Child: A Miscellany of Poems and Verses (1981)
- The Collected Poems of George Garrett (1984)
- Days of Our Lives Lie in Fragments: New and Old Poems, 1957–1997 (1998)

=== Other writings ===
- James Jones (biography) (1984)
- Understanding Mary Lee Settle (1988)
- My Silk Purse and Yours: The Publishing Scene and American Literary Art (1992)
- The Sorrows of Fat City: A Selection of Literary Essays and Reviews (1992)
- Whistling in the Dark: True Stories and Other Fables (1992)
- Bad Man Blues: A Portable George Garrett (1998)
- Going to See the Elephant: Pieces of a Writing Life (2002)
- Southern Excursions: Views on Southern Letters in My Time (2003)
- Blackbird: Spring 2008
- THEN AND NOW: "IN COLD BLOOD" REVISITED
