= Heinrich Fraenkel =

Writer and Hollywood screenwriter (1897–1986)

- Born: 28 September 1897 Lissa, Province of Posen, German Empire
- Died: 1 May 1986 (aged 88) Ealing, London, United Kingdom
- Occupation: Biographer; Hollywood writer; political author; activist
- Genre: Film, Nazi war crime, anti-Nazi, essays

Heinrich Fraenkel (28 September 1897 – 1 May 1986) was a writer and Hollywood screenwriter best known for his biographies of Nazi war criminals published in the 1960s and 1970s.

== Biography ==
Fraenkel was born in Lissa, Province of Posen, Germany (now Leszno, Poland) into a Jewish family. He emigrated from Nazi Germany and lived in Britain.

His works include:

- Göring (1962, with Roger Manvell).
- Hess: A Biography (1971, with Roger Manvell).
- The Canaris Conspiracy: The Secret Resistance to Hitler in the German Army, by Roger Manvell, Heinrich Fraenkel, 1st Edition (1972).

Under the pseudonym "Assiac", Fraenkel edited a chess column in the New Statesman and published several chess books, among them Adventures in Chess (1951, the American edition was published as The Pleasures of Chess, and on pp. 183–184 of that book, Fraenkel explained that "Assiac" is "Caïssa", the goddess of chess, spelled backwards).

He died in Ealing, England.

== Selected filmography ==
- The Dance Goes On (1930)
- The Sacred Flame (1931)
- Menace (1934)
- Youthful Folly (1934)
