= The Sacred Flame (play) =

1928 play by W. Somerset Maugham

First UK edition (publ Heinemann)

The Sacred Flame (1928) is William Somerset Maugham's 21st play, written at the age of 54. Maugham dedicated the publication to his friend Messmore Kendall.

The play, written as three acts, is unique within the total of Maugham's list of 24 plays, in that he changed from his previous methodology of using the naturalistic speech pattern he had been so well known for, to experiment with a more literary dialogue. Despite being a commercial success, Maugham did not repeat the experiment of literary dialogue again in any of his future plays.

== Plot ==
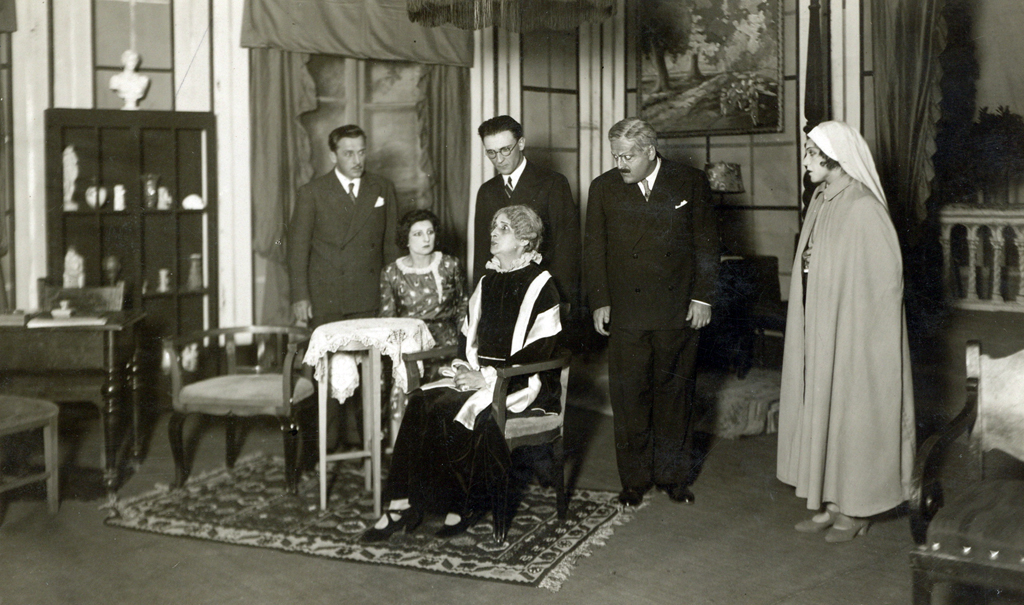
The play by the Ljubljana Drama Theatre in 1930

The Sacred Flame is the story about the misfortune of Maurice Tabret, previously a soldier of World War I who had returned home unscathed to marry his sweetheart Stella. Unfortunately, after only a year of marriage, Maurice is involved in a plane crash and left crippled from the waist down. The play commences some years later in Gatley House near London, home of Maurice's mother, Mrs. Tabret.

Mrs. Tabret's home has been set up to care for her son and a young Nurse Wayland has been Maurice's constant aid throughout. She is extremely professional and devoted to her job. Maurice's wife Stella lives with them also and remains his cheerful companion and support. Maurice's brother Colin Tabret has returned from a time in Guatemala to spend the previous 11 months before the play's start with his brother and the family. The local practitioner Dr. Harvester visits frequently to check on Maurice's condition and to prescribe appropriate treatments. Mrs. Tabret's own husband has passed on some time ago and whilst she does not have a close relationship with anyone else, her old friend retired Major Liconda visits often.

All is as well as can be expected until Maurice is found dead in his bed one morning. Not altogether unexpected, Dr. Harvester is prepared to write the death certificate but then Nurse Wayland cries foul and indicates that she believes Maurice was murdered by being given an overdose of his sleeping draught. The play then works through a series of Agatha Christie-style "whodunnit" scenes as the audience attempt to figure out whether Maurice was killed, killed himself, or else if the whole thing is no more than an imagining and false accusation by the Nurse.

For the majority of the second and third act the main suspect is Stella, who it transpires is having an affair with Colin and is pregnant by him. It looks as if the matter will be brought to the coroner and the police, which is likely to mean Stella going on trial for Maurice's murder. At the end of the third act, Mrs. Tabret reveals that it was she that killed Maurice. She had realised that Stella was pregnant, and because Stella's love was all that Maurice lived for, she couldn't bear to see Stella's betrayal exposed. Mrs. Tabret therefore sees her act as a mercy killing.

After this revelation, the play ends as Nurse Wayland asks Dr. Harvester to sign the death certificate indicating that Maurice died of natural causes, meaning there will be no police investigation.

== Productions ==
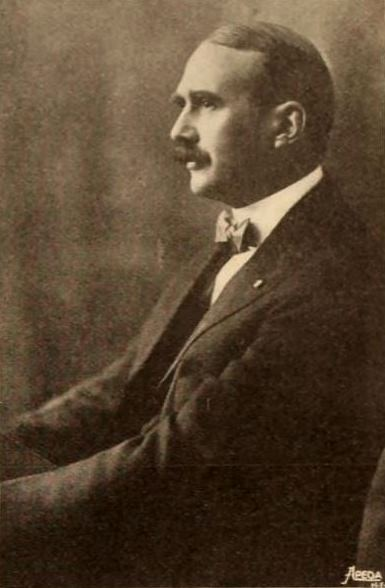
Messmore Kendall, producer of The Sacred Flame and the person to whom Maugham dedicated the play

The Sacred Flame premiered 19 November 1928, at Henry Miller's Theatre in New York City. Gilbert Miller directed the three-act drama, which he co-produced with Messmore Kendall. The play closed 10 December 1928, after 24 performances by the following cast:

- Anthony Bushell as Colin Tabret
- Clare Eames as Nurse Wayland
- Hubert Harben as Major Liconda
- Robert Harris as Maurice Tabret
- Mary Jerrold as Mrs. Tabret
- Eva Leonard-Boyne as Alice
- Stanley Logan as Dr. Harvester
- Casha Pringle as Stella Tabret

The play was produced in London in February 1929, featuring Gladys Cooper in the role of Stella and Mary Jerrold as Mrs Tabret.

=== Revivals ===
In 1966 a major production was presented in the West End starring Gladys Cooper, this time in the role of Mrs Tabret, alongside Wendy Hiller and Leo Genn. There were no major productions between 1967 and 2012, when English Touring Theatre presented a new production for a UK tour.

== Adaptations ==
In 1929 Hollywood studio Warner Brothers adapted it as an early sound film The Sacred Flame, followed by a German-language version. In 1935 the studio remade the play as The Right to Live starring Colin Clive and George Brent.

== Radio ==
- Radio version with Sybil Thorndike, Jill Balcon, Carleton Hobbs, BBC radio, 17 July 1965.

== Television ==
- The play was broadcast live, BBC Television, Tuesday 13 March 1951
- A version broadcast on BBC Sunday Night Theatre, 10 July 1955
