= Darling Caroline (novel) =

1947 novel by Jacques Laurent

- First edition (French)
- Author: Jacques Laurent
- Language: French
- Genre: Historical adventure
- Publisher: Jean Froissart
- Publication date: 1947
- Publication place: France
- Media type: Print

Darling Caroline (French: Caroline chérie) is a 1947 historical novel by the French writer Jacques Laurent. It portrays the adventures of a daring young woman at the time of the French Revolution. A popular hit, it was followed by several sequels.

== Adaptations ==
It has been turned into films on two occasions: a 1951 film Darling Caroline directed by Richard Pottier and starring Martine Carol, which was followed by two sequels, and Darling Caroline directed by Denys de La Patellière and starring France Anglade.

== Bibliography ==
- Goble, Alan. The Complete Index to Literary Sources in Film. Walter de Gruyter, 1999.
