= Jean Aurel =

French film director and scriptwriter (1925–1996)

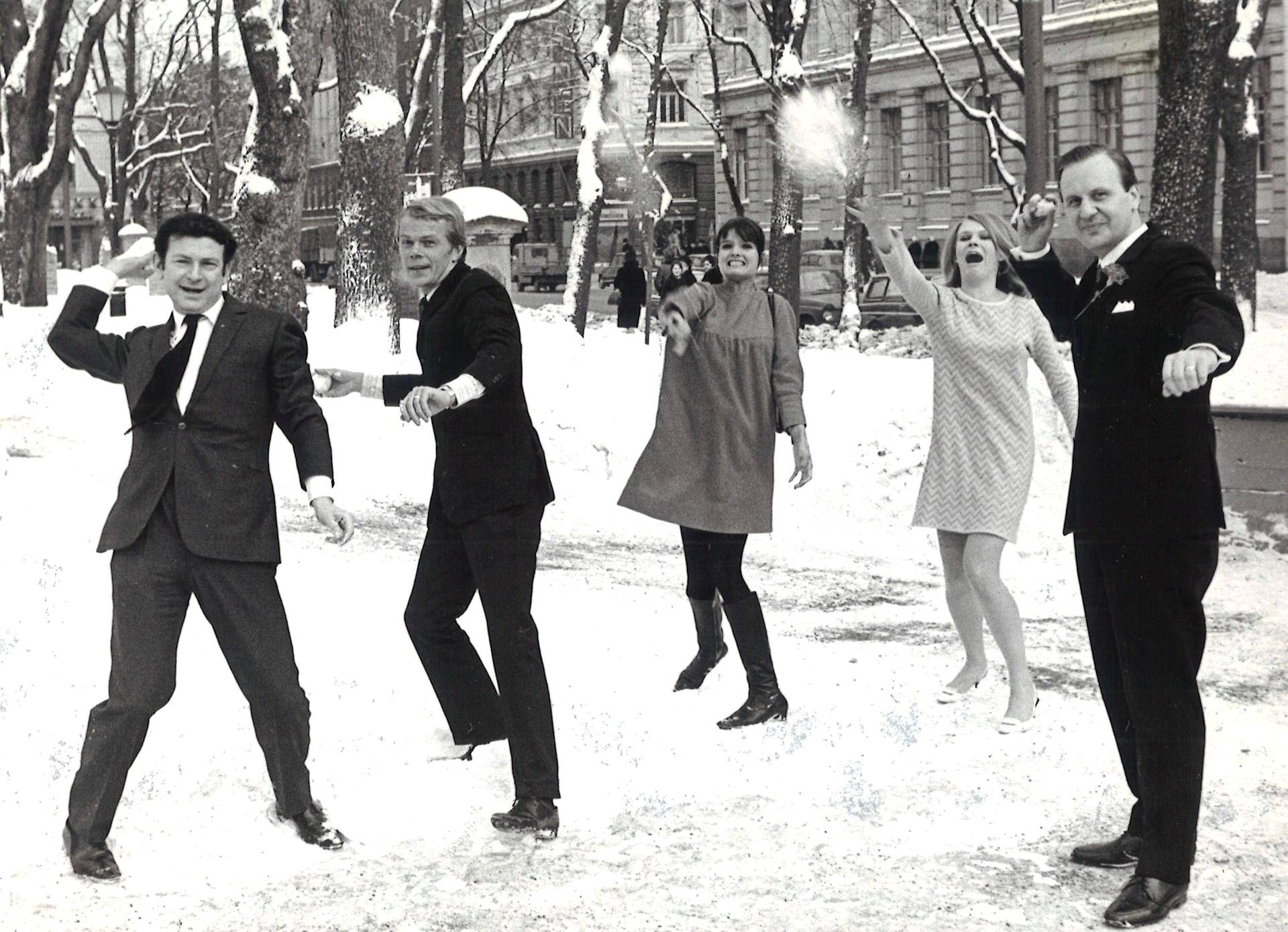
Jean Aurel (leftmost) in Helsinki, Finland in 1968

Jean Aurel (6 November 1925 in Rastolita, Romania – 24 August 1996 in Paris) was a Romanian-born French film director and scriptwriter. Notably, he co-wrote La Femme d'à côté (The Woman Next Door) with François Truffaut and Suzanne Schiffman.

== Selected filmography ==
- Mata Hari's Daughter (1954)
- Frou-Frou (1955)
- Maid in Paris (1956)
- Women's Club (1956)
- It Happened in Aden (1956)
- Gates of Paris (1957)
- Une Parisienne (1957)
- Taxi, Roulotte et Corrida (1958)
- Le Trou (1960)
- Please, Not Now! (1961)
- Good Luck, Charlie (1962)
- 14-18 (1963)
- De l'amour (1964)
- Lamiel (1967)
- Manon 70 (1968)
- Les Femmes (1969)
- Vivre ensemble (1973 – actor)
- Like a Pot of Strawberries (1974)
- Love on the Run (1979)
- The Woman Next Door (1981)
- Confidentially Yours (aka Finally, Sunday!; 1983)
