= Jean Devaivre =

French screenwriter and film director (born 1912–2004)

- Born: 18 December 1912; Boulogne-sur-Seine, Paris, France
- Died: 28 April 2004 (aged 91); Villejuif, Val-de-Marne, France
- Occupations: Director, Writer
- Years active: 1936–1957

Jean Devaivre (born Jean Justin Michel de Vaivre; 18 December 1912 – 28 April 2004) was a French film director and screenwriter. Additionally, he worked as a dubbing director, preparing foreign-language films for release in France. The film Safe Conduct (Laissez-passer, 2002) directed by Bertrand Tavernier is based on Devaivre's activities in the French film industry during the wartime Occupation of France.

His brother Louis Devaivre was a film editor.

== Selected filmography ==
- Shop Girls of Paris (1943)
- The Eleven O'Clock Woman (1948)
- The Farm of Seven Sins (1949)
- Fugitive from Montreal (1950)
- Vendetta in Camargue (1950)
- My Wife, My Cow and Me (1952)
- Alarm in Morocco (1953)
- A Caprice of Darling Caroline (1953)
- Caroline and the Rebels (1955)
- The Inspector Likes a Fight (1957)

== Bibliography ==
- Rège, Philippe. Encyclopedia of French Film Directors, Volume 1. Scarecrow Press, 2009.
