= All About Loving =

1964 film

- Film poster
- Directed by: Jean Aurel
- Written by: Cécil Saint-Laurent; Jean Aurel
- Produced by: Pierre Braunberger
- Starring: Anna Karina
- Cinematography: Edmond Richard
- Edited by: Agnès Guillemot
- Distributed by: Bargate Films; Cocinor; Europa Film
- Release date: 29 December 1964
- Running time: 90 minutes
- Countries: France; Italy
- Language: French

All About Loving (French: De l'amour) is a 1964 French comedy film directed by Jean Aurel and starring Anna Karina.

== Cast ==
- Anna Karina as Hélène
- Elsa Martinelli as Mathilde
- Michel Piccoli as Raoul
- Jean Sorel as Antoine
- Philippe Avron as Serge
- Joanna Shimkus as Sophie
- Bernard Garnier as Werther
- Isabelle Lunghini
- Bernard Nicolas as Frédéric
- Katia Christine as Katia Kristine
