= The Sacred Flame (1931 film) =

1931 film

- Directed by: William Dieterle; Berthold Viertel
- Written by: Heinrich Fraenkel; Berthold Viertel
- Based on: The Sacred Flame by Somerset Maugham
- Produced by: Henry Blanke
- Starring: Gustav Fröhlich; Dita Parlo; Hans Heinrich von Twardowski
- Cinematography: Frank Kesson
- Production company: Warner Brothers
- Distributed by: Deutsche First National Pictures
- Release date: May 5, 1931
- Running time: 86 minutes
- Country: United States
- Language: German

The Sacred Flame (German: Die heilige Flamme) is a lost 1931 American drama film directed by William Dieterle and Berthold Viertel and starring Gustav Fröhlich, Dita Parlo and Hans Heinrich von Twardowski. It was made by Warner Brothers as a German-language remake of the studio's 1929 film The Sacred Flame. It is based upon the 1928 play of the same name by W. Somerset Maugham.

== Synopsis ==
After newly married Stella's husband is badly injured in a plane crash, causing him to lose the use of his legs, she becomes emotionally involved with his brother.

== Reception ==
Rudolf Arnheim said "It is incomprehensible how such a film can be launched in a large cinema, rather than being chastely hidden away from the eyes of any kind of criticism."

== Cast ==
- Gustav Fröhlich as Walter Taylor
- Dita Parlo as Stella
- Hans Heinrich von Twardowski as Robert Taylor
- Salka Viertel as Frau Taylor
- Charlotte Hagenbruch as Schwester Weyland
- Vladimir Sokoloff as Doctor Harvester
- Anton Pointner as Major Liconda
- Hubert von Meyerinck as Pfarrer
