= Les Bêtises (novel) =

1971 novel by Jacques Laurent

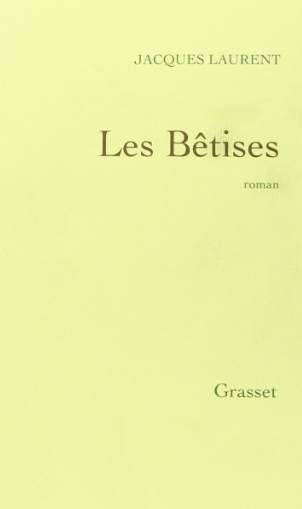
- Author: Jacques Laurent
- Language: French
- Publisher: Éditions Grasset
- Publication date: 12 October 1971
- Publication place: France
- Pages: 579

Les Bêtises ("The stupid things") is a 1971 novel by the French writer Jacques Laurent. It recounts 47 years in the life of an adventurous and well-travelled man, in the forms of his own notes, diary entries, an unfinished novel and comments, collected by a friend after the man's death. Laurent wrote the novel over a period of 22 years.

== Reception ==
The novel received the Prix Goncourt, with five votes against four in the sixth voting round. It was also the first choice for the Prix Renaudot, but the Renaudot can never go to the same book as the Goncourt, so the award went to the jury's second choice, Le Sac du palais d'été by Pierre-Jean Rémy. Although there are no political themes in Les Bêtises, the Goncourt jury's decision proved controversial within the leftist press due to Laurent's right-wing sympathies, and journalists complained that there were no working-class people in the novel.
