= A Caprice of Darling Caroline =

1953 film

- Directed by: Jean Devaivre
- Written by: Jean Anouilh; Jacques Laurent
- Based on: A Caprice of Darling Caroline by Jacques Laurent
- Produced by: François Chavane; Alain Poiré; Robert Sussfeld
- Starring: Martine Carol; Jacques Dacqmine; Marthe Mercadier
- Cinematography: André Thomas
- Edited by: Raymond Lamy
- Music by: Georges Van Parys
- Production companies: Cinéphonic; Gaumont
- Distributed by: Gaumont Distribution
- Release date: 6 March 1953
- Running time: 104 minutes
- Country: France
- Language: French

A Caprice of Darling Caroline (French: Un caprice de Caroline chérie) is a 1953 French historical comedy film directed by Jean Devaivre and starring Martine Carol, Jacques Dacqmine and Marthe Mercadier. It is based on the 1950 novel of the same title by Jacques Laurent. It was the sequel to the 1951 hit Darling Caroline. It was shot at the Boulogne Studios in Paris. The film's sets were designed by the art director Jacques Krauss. It was one of the first French films to be shot in Technicolor.

== Cast ==
- Martine Carol as Caroline de Bièvre
- Jacques Dacqmine as Gaston de Sallanches
- Marthe Mercadier as Ida
- Véra Norman as Comtesse Paolina Ruccelli
- Jean Pâqui as Le capitaine de Cépoys
- Jean-Claude Pascal as Livio
- Denise Provence as Comtesse Clélia de Montelone
- Jean Tissier as Le trésorier-payeur
- Mady Berry as Marquise de Montelone
- Christine Carère as Chekina
- Gil Delamare as Lieutenant Berthier
- Jacques Dufilho as Giuseppe
- Claire Maurier as Jeannette - la camériste de Caroline
- René Mazé as Le tambour
- Alexandre Rignault as Le violeur

== Reception ==
Reception of the film was divided, with Cardinal Pierre-Marie Gerlier describing it as "a scandalous display of vice".

== Bibliography ==
- Crisp, C.G. The Classic French Cinema, 1930-1960. Indiana University Press, 1993.
- Goble, Alan. The Complete Index to Literary Sources in Film. Walter de Gruyter, 1999.
