= Death of the Fox =

1971 novel by George Garrett

- Author: George Garrett
- Language: English
- Publisher: Doubleday
- Publication date: 1971
- Dewey Decimal: 813.54
- LC Class: PZ4.G238 De

Death of the Fox is a 1971 historical fiction novel written by George Garrett, the first of three books set within the historical context of Elizabethan England. the novel explores the relationship between Sir Walter Raleigh and Queen Elizabeth I of England, and his subsequent fall from royal favour for alleged conspiracy against James I.

It was the first of 3 books set in this period; all three (Death of the Fox, Entered from the Sun and Succession) were later combined into The Elizabethan Trilogy in 1998.

According to WorldCat, the book is held in 1,571 libraries, the most widely held of any of Garrett's books.

== Reviews ==
Described by Kirkus Reviews as "the novel is locked into its own period and reference so that the effect of this tale of life and the abyss is removed and derived rather than immediate and shared. Still a tour de force of its kind."
