= Darling Caroline (1951 film) =

1951 film

- Directed by: Richard Pottier
- Written by: Jean Anouilh; Michel Audiard
- Based on: Darling Caroline by Jacques Laurent
- Produced by: François Chavane; Alain Poiré
- Starring: Martine Carol; Jacques Dacqmine; Marie Déa
- Cinematography: Maurice Barry
- Edited by: Jean Feyte
- Music by: Georges Auric
- Production companies: Cinéphonic; Gaumont
- Distributed by: Gaumont-Eagle Lion
- Release date: 23 February 1951
- Running time: 141 minutes
- Country: France
- Language: French

Darling Caroline (French: Caroline Chérie) is a 1951 French historical comedy film in black and white, directed by Richard Pottier and starring Martine Carol, Jacques Dacqmine, and Marie Déa. It is based on Jacques Laurent's historical novel "The loves of Caroline Cherie: A novel". It was remade as Darling Caroline in 1968.

It was shot at the Billancourt Studios in Paris. The film's sets were designed by the art director Jacques Krauss. It was followed by two sequels A Caprice of Darling Caroline (1953) and Caroline and the Rebels (1955). While Carol reprised her role for the first film, the second starred Brigitte Bardot playing a different character.

== Plot ==
During her birthday in France, July 1782, the beautiful young Marchioness Caroline meets the attractive soldier Gaston. It is love at first sight, but Gaston does not wish to make a commitment because a military career waits for him. Caroline marries then a politician but the French Revolution bursts and Caroline has to run away to escape the guillotine. By running away, she meets Gaston again who decides to help her.

== Cast ==
- Martine Carol as Caroline de Bièvre
- Jacques Dacqmine as Gaston de Sallanches
- Marie Déa as Madame de Coigny
- Raymond Souplex as Sir Belhomme
- Jacques Clancy as Georges Berthier
- Pierre Cressoy as Pont-Bellanger / Malenger
- Paul Bernard as Boismussy
- Jacques Bernard as Henri de Bièvre
- Nadine Alari as Charlotte Berthier
- Germaine Kerjean as La Chabannes
- Madeleine Barbulée as Mme de Tourville, la gouvernante
- Jacques Varennes as Le marquis de Bièvre / Duke
- Yvonne de Bray as La duchesse / Duchess
- Alfred Adam as Jules - le postillon
- Jane Marken as Cathy, la nourrice
- Claire Olivier as La chanoinesse
- Jacques Dufilho as Le valet de Pont-Bellanger / Giuseppe
- Colette Régis as La marquise de Bièvre
- Jacques Baumer as L'officier chez Van Krift
- Sophie Leclair as Marie-Anne de Forbin
- Marcelle Praince as Citoyenne Bouchon, la concierge
- Catherine Fonteney as La vieille belle
- Danièle Seller as Louise de Bièvre
- Robert Hommet as Charmeil
- Olivier Hussenot as Un commissaire
- Robert Seller as Le commissaire
- Alexandre Mihalesco as L'aubergiste
- Germaine Reuver as Citoyenne Poilu

== See also ==
- List of historical drama films
- List of French films of 1951
- List of epic films

== Bibliography ==
- Geoffrey Nowell-Smith. The Oxford History of World Cinema. Oxford University Press, 1996.
