= Roger Manvell =

British author & civil servant (1909–1987)

- Born: 10 October 1909; London, England
- Died: 30 November 1987 (aged 78); Boston, Massachusetts, U.S.

Arnold Roger Manvell (10 October 1909 – 30 November 1987) was the first director of the British Film Academy (1947–1959) and author of many books on films and film-making. He wrote (sometimes in collaboration with Heinrich Fraenkel) many books on Nazi Germany, including biographies of Adolf Hitler, Rudolf Hess, Heinrich Himmler, Joseph Goebbels and Hermann Göring.

During World War II, Manvell worked in the Ministry of Information, creating propaganda films for the British government. In his career, he also lectured widely in universities, and was a broadcaster and screenwriter. He joined the Boston University faculty in 1975 teaching film history classes at the College of Communications. Manvell was named University Professor in 1982.

== Biography ==
He was the son of the Rev. Arnold Edward William Manvell, who graduated B.A. at the University of Oxford in 1891, and his wife Gertrude Theresa Baines, daughter of Samuel Charles Baines of Leicester. He was educated at Wyggeston Grammar School for Boys, Leicester, and King's School, Peterborough. He read English literature at University College, Leicester, then gaining a doctorate at the University of London. After a period as a schoolteacher, he joined Bristol University in 1937.

From 1940 Manvell worked at the Ministry of Information, concentrating on film work. He then worked for two year at the BFI, before taking up a position in 1947 as Director of the British Film Academy.

Manvell recalled his interest in cinema began when he was five years old, specifically due to film serials and slapstick comedy. He received his London PhD on the verse and critical work of poet W. B. Yeats. In his 1944 book Film, Manvell thanked his parents for teaching him "to go to the pictures," and John Grierson for teaching him "to look at them."

== Books ==
Some books authored or co-authored by Roger Manvell.

=== Novels ===
- The Dreamers
- The Passion

=== On the arts (film/television/theatre) ===
- A Seat at the Cinema
- Age of Communication: Press, Books, Films, Radio, TV
- Art in Movement: New Directions in Animation
- The Cinema (annual Pelican film review)
- Design in motion
- Experiment in the Film
- Film (1944)
- Film and The Public (annual Pelican film review)
- Film and the Second World War (1974)
- The German Cinema
- History of the British Film
- Images of Madness: Portrayal of Insanity in the Feature Film
- The International Encyclopedia of Film
- Living Screen: Background to the Film and Television
- Love Goddesses of the Movies
- Masterworks of the German Cinema: The Golem – Nosferatu – M -The Threepenny Opera
- New Cinema in Britain
- New Cinema in Europe
- New cinema in the U.S.A: The feature film since 1946
- On the air: A study of broadcasting in sound and television
- The Penguin Film Review (1946-1949)
- Progress in Television
- Shakespeare and the Film (1979)
- Selected Comedies: Elizabeth Inchbald
- The Technique of Film Animation
- The Technique of Film Music
- Theatre and Film: A Comparative Study of the Two Forms of Dramatic Art and of the Problems of Adaptation of Stage Plays into Films
- This Age of Communication
- Three British screen plays: "Brief Encounter","Odd man out," "Scott of the Antarctic"
- What is Film?

=== On Nazi Germany ===
- The Canaris Conspiracy
- The Conspirators
- Doctor Goebbels: His Life & Death
- Films and the Second World War
- Gestapo
- Göring
- Hess
- Heinrich Himmler: The SS, Gestapo, His Life and Career
- Heinrich Himmler
- Hitler: The Man and The Myth
- The Hundred Days to Hitler
- Incomparable Crime, The: Mass Extermination in the Twentieth Century
- The July Plot
- SS & Gestapo: Rule of Terror

=== Biography ===
- Chaplin
- Elizabeth Inchbald: England's Principal Woman Dramatist and Independent Woman of Letters in 18th Century London – A Biographical Study
- Ellen Terry (1968)
- Ingmar Bergman, an Appreciation
- Sarah Siddons
- The Trial of Annie Besant and Charles Bradlaugh
