= 1925 in literature =

This article contains information about the literary events and publications of 1925.

== Events ==
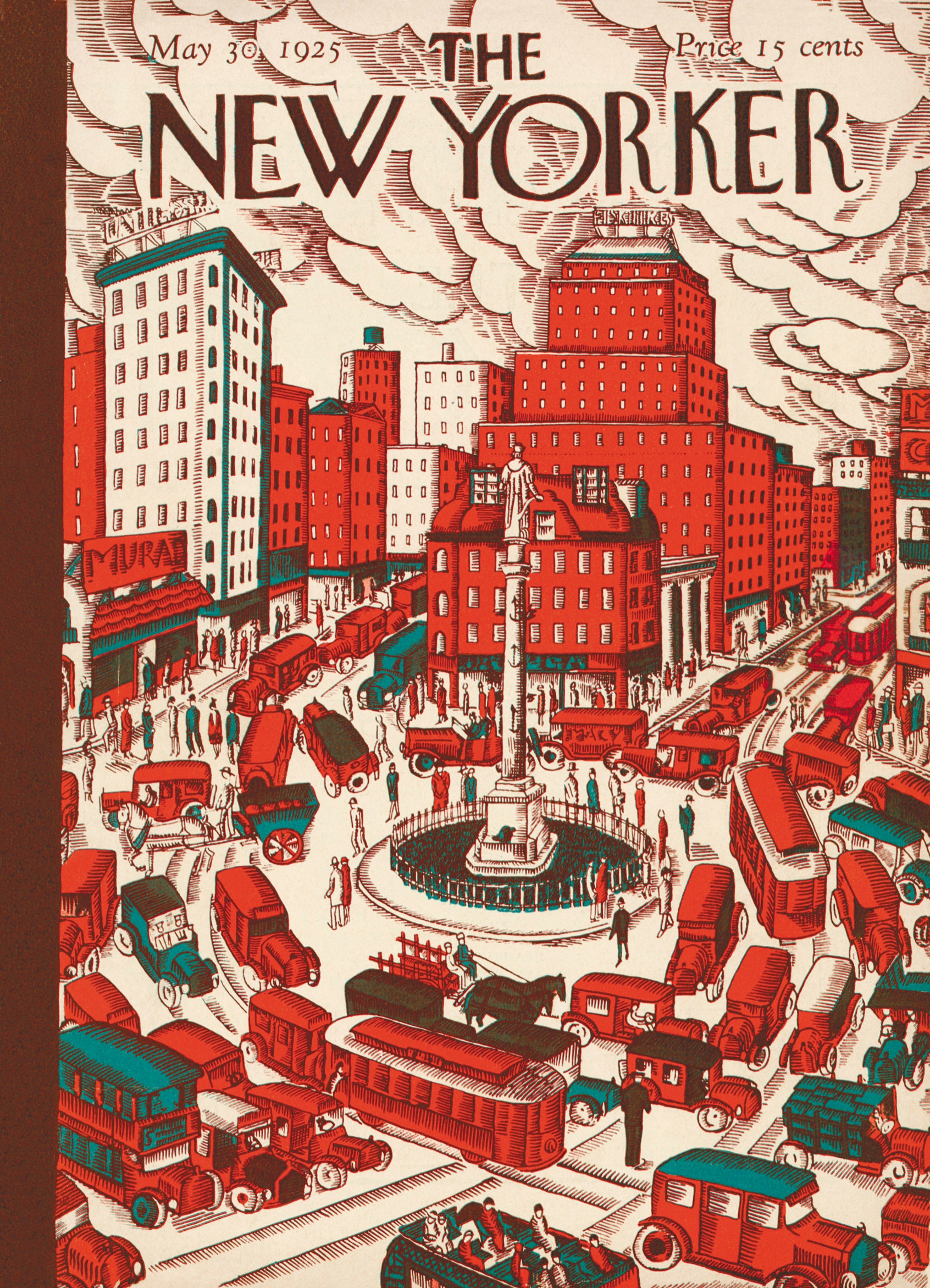
Cover of an issue of The New Yorker from May 30, 1925, illustrated by Ilonka Karasz, a regular cover artist for The New Yorker

- February 21 – The first issue of The New Yorker magazine is published by Harold Ross.
- February 28 – The first story under the name B. Traven (identified variously as actor Ret Marut or Otto Feige) is published, in Vorwärts (Berlin).
- April – F. Scott Fitzgerald and Ernest Hemingway meet in the Dingo Bar, rue Delambre, in the Montparnasse quarter of Paris, after the April 10 publication of Fitzgerald's The Great Gatsby (by Charles Scribner's Sons in New York City) and before Hemingway departs on a trip to Spain that he will fictionalize in The Sun Also Rises (1926).
- May 14 – Virginia Woolf's novel Mrs Dalloway is published by the Hogarth Press in Bloomsbury, London. Woolf is beginning work on To the Lighthouse.
- May 20 – C. S. Lewis is elected a fellow of Magdalen College, Oxford, where he tutors in English language and literature until 1954.
- Summer – Samuel Beckett plays in the first of two first-class cricket matches, for Dublin University against Northamptonshire.
- July 22 – The first of Ben Travers' "Aldwych farces", A Cuckoo in the Nest, opens at London's Aldwych Theatre in a production by actor-manager Tom Walls featuring the brothers Ralph Lynn, Gordon James and Hastings Lynn.
- October 1 – J. R. R. Tolkien becomes Rawlinson and Bosworth Professor of Anglo-Saxon at the University of Oxford.
- December 24 – A. A. Milne's Winnie-the-Pooh story "The Wrong Sort of Bees" appears in the London Evening News.
- December 28 – The Russian poet Sergei Yesenin (born 1895) writes a farewell poem, "Goodbye, my friend, goodbye" (До свиданья, друг мой, до свиданья) in his own blood before hanging himself at the Angleterre Hotel, Leningrad.
- December – W. H. Auden and Christopher Isherwood meet for the first time as adults in London.
- unknown dates
  - Ernest Blythe, Minister for Finance in the Irish Free State, arranges an annual government subsidy of £850 for the Abbey Theatre in Dublin, making it the first state-supported theatre in the English-speaking world.
  - Miss Riboet's Orion theatrical troupe is established in the Dutch East Indies.
  - The first complete translation of the 14th-century Romance of the Three Kingdoms (三國演義) from Chinese into English is published by Charles Henry Brewitt-Taylor.
  - Leslie Hotson publishes the first account from contemporary records of the murder of the dramatist Christopher Marlowe in 1593, claiming to have found the evidence while researching Chaucer's The Nun's Priest's Tale in the archives of the English Public Records Office in 1923–1924.
  - T. S. Eliot leaves Lloyds Bank in London and joins the new publishers Faber and Gwyer, having been recommended to Geoffrey Faber by Charles Whibley.
  - The Modern Library is taken over by Bennett Cerf and Donald Klopfer.

== New books ==
=== Fiction ===
- Sherwood Anderson – Dark Laughter
- Sergei Auslender – «Дни боевые» (Dni boevye, Fighting Days)
- Alexander Belyaev – Professor Dowell's Head
- E. F. Benson – Rex
- André Billy – L'Ange qui pleure
- James Boyd – Drums
- Lynn Brock – Colonel Gore’s Second Case
- Louis Bromfield – Possession
- D. K. Broster – The Flight of the Heron (first of her Jacobite Trilogy)
- Mihail Bulgakov
  - A Young Doctor's Notebook (Записки юного врача; partial publication)
  - The Fatal Eggs (Роковые яйца)
  - The White Guard (Белая гвардия; partial serialization)
- Mary Butts – Ashe of Rings
- Willa Cather – The Professor's House
- Blaise Cendrars – L'Or: la merveilleuse histoire du général Johann August Suter (translated as Sutter's Gold)
- André Chamson – Roux le bandit
- Arthur Bowie Chrisman – Shen of the Sea
- Agatha Christie – The Secret of Chimneys
- Ivy Compton-Burnett – Pastors and Masters
- Marie Corelli – Open Confession to a Man from a Woman
- Warwick Deeping – Sorrell and Son
- Maurice Dekobra – La Madone des sleepings (The Madonna of the Sleeping-Cars)
- Brian Oswald Donn-Byrne – Hangman's House
- John Dos Passos – Manhattan Transfer
- Theodore Dreiser – An American Tragedy
- Lion Feuchtwanger – Jud Süß (translated as Jew Süss or Power)
- F. Scott Fitzgerald – The Great Gatsby
- Rosita Forbes – If the Gods Laugh
- Ford Madox Ford – No More Parades
- Konstantine Gamsakhurdia – The Smile of Dionysus
- David Garnett – The Sailor's Return
- William Gerhardie – The Polyglots
- André Gide – Les faux-monnayeurs
- Ellen Glasgow – Barren Ground
- Maxim Gorky
  - The Artamonov Business (Дело Артамоновых)
  - Stories of 1922–1924 (Рассказы 1922–1924 годов)
- Thea von Harbou – Metropolis
- L. P. Hartley – Simonetta Perkins
- Ernest Hemingway – In Our Time (short stories)
- DuBose Heyward – Porgy
- Sydney Horler – The Ball of Fortune
- Aldous Huxley – Those Barren Leaves
- Mikheil Javakhishvili – Jaqo's Dispossessed (Georgian: ჯაყოს ხიზნები)
- Franz Kafka (died 1924) – The Trial (Der Process, written 1914–15)
- Ronald Knox – The Viaduct Murder
- Sinclair Lewis – Arrowsmith
- Anita Loos – Gentlemen Prefer Blondes
- Marie Belloc Lowndes
  - Some Men and Women
  - Bread of Deceit
- Compton Mackenzie – Coral
- W. Somerset Maugham – The Painted Veil
- Thomas Mofolo – Chaka
- Eugenio Montale – Ossi di seppia
- Liam O'Flaherty – The Informer
- E. Phillips Oppenheim – Gabriel Samara, Peacemaker
- Baroness Orczy
  - The Miser of Maida Vale
  - A Question of Temptation
- William Plomer – Turbott Wolfe
- Gene Stratton-Porter – The Keeper of the Bees
- Marcel Proust – Albertine disparue
- Jean-Joseph Rabearivelo – L'Aube rouge (The Red Dawn) (written; published 1998)
- John Rhode – The Paddington Mystery
- Henry Handel Richardson (Et Florence Robertson) – The Way Home (second part of The Fortunes of Richard Mahony)
- William Riley – Peter Pettinger
- Kate Roberts – O gors y bryniau (Welsh short stories)
- Romain Rolland – Le Jeu de l'amour et de la mort (The Game of Love and Death)
- Dorothy Scarborough – The Wind
- Una Lucy Silberrad – The Vow of Micah Jordan
- Gertrude Stein – The Making of Americans
- James Stevens – Paul Bunyan
- Etsu Inagaki Sugimoto - A Daughter of the Samurai
- Sigrid Undset – The Master of Hestviken, vol. 1: The Axe
- Carl Van Vechten – Firecrackers. A Realistic Novel
- Edgar Wallace
  - The Blue Hand
  - The Fellowship of the Frog
  - The Mind of Mr. J. G. Reeder
  - The Strange Countess
  - The Three Just Men
- Hugh Walpole – Portrait of a Man with Red Hair
- Hugo Wast – Stone Desert
- H. G. Wells – Christina Alberta's Father
- Edith Wharton – The Mother's Recompense
- William Carlos Williams – In the American Grain
- P. G. Wodehouse – Carry On, Jeeves
- Virginia Woolf – Mrs Dalloway
- Elinor Wylie – The Venetian Glass Nephew
- Francis Brett Young – Sea Horses
- Ernst Zahn – Frau Sixta

=== Children and young people ===
- Elinor Brent-Dyer – The School at the Chalet
- A. M. Burrage – Poor Dear Esme
- Hugh Lofting – Doctor Dolittle's Zoo (5th in a series of 13 books)
- L. M. Montgomery – Emily Climbs (2nd in a series of 3 books)
- Ruth Plumly Thompson – The Lost King of Oz (19th in the Oz series overall and the fifth written by her)
- Else Ury – Nesthäkchen With White Hair (Nesthäkchen im weißen Haar)

=== Drama ===
- J. R. Ackerley – The Prisoners of War
- Arnolt Bronnen – The Bird of Youth (Geburt der Jugend)
- Mikhail Bulgakov – Zoyka's Apartment (written)
- Noël Coward – Hay Fever (first performed) and Fallen Angels
- Joseph Jefferson Farjeon – Number 17
- Federico García Lorca – The Billy-Club Puppets (Los títeres de cachiporra)
- Patrick Hastings – The River
- Hugo von Hofmannsthal – The Tower (Der Turm)
- Keble Howard – Lord Babs
- Zora Neale Hurston – Color Struck
- George Kelly – Craig's Wife
- John Howard Lawson – Processional
- Ben Travers – A Cuckoo in the Nest
- John Van Druten – Young Woodley
- Franz Werfel – Juarez und Maximilian
- Stanisław Ignacy Witkiewicz – The Beelzebub Sonata (Sonata Belzebuba)
- Carl Zuckmayer – The Merry Vineyard (Der fröhliche Weinberg)

=== Poetry ===
- T. S. Eliot – The Hollow Men
- F. W. Harvey – September and Other Poems

=== Non-fiction ===
- Max Aitken – Politicians and the Press
- Alice Bailey – A Treatise on Cosmic Fire
- Edwin Burtt – The Metaphysical Foundations of Modern Physical Science
- G. K. Chesterton – The Everlasting Man
- Maurice Halbwachs – La Mémoire collective (On Collective Memory)
- Adolf Hitler – Mein Kampf
- Walter Lippmann – The Phantom Public
- Dmitry Merezhkovsky
  - The Birth of Gods: Tutankhamen in Crete (Rozhdenīe bogov: Tutankamon na Kritie)
  - The Mystery of the Three: Egypt and Babylon (Taĭna trekh: Egipet i Vavilon)
- Arthur E. Powell – The Etheric Double and Allied Phenomena
- Franz Roh – Nach Expressionismus – Magischer Realismus: Probleme der neuesten europäischen Malerei (After Expressionism – Magical Realism: Problems of the newest European painting)
- George Saintsbury, ed. – The Receipt Book of Mrs. Anne Blencowe (manuscript 1694)
- Clare Sheridan – Across Europe with Satanella (motorcycle tour)
- J. R. R. Tolkien – "The Devil's Coach Horses"
- Hendrik Willem van Loon – Tolerance
- H. G. Wells – A Year of Prophesying

=== Anthologies ===
- Alain Locke (editor) – The New Negro

== Births ==
- January 7 – Gerald Durrell, Indian-born British naturalist and author (died 1995)
- January 8 – James Saunders, English dramatist (died 2004)
- January 9 – Abdelhamid ben Hadouga, Algerian writer (died 1996)
- January 11 – William Styron, American writer (died 2006)
- January 14 – Yukio Mishima (三島 由紀夫, Kimitake Hiraoka), Japanese author and political activist (died 1970)
- January 17 – Robert Cormier, American young-adult novelist (died 2000)
- January 20 – Ernesto Cardenal, Nicaraguan Catholic priest and poet (died 2020)
- January 26 – Miep Diekmann, Dutch writer of children's literature (died 2017)
- February 18
  - Jack Gilbert, American poet and educator (died 2012)
  - Krishna Sobti, Indian Hindi-language fiction writer and essayist (died 2019)
- February 20 – Alex La Guma, South African novelist and political activist (died 1985)
- February 22
  - Edward Gorey, American illustrator and writer (died 2000)
  - Gerald Stern, American poet and academic (died 2022)
- March 6 – Peter Whigham, English poet and translator (died 1987)
- March 8 – Marta Lynch, Argentinian writer (died 1985)
- March 14 – John Wain, English novelist and short-story writer (died 1994)
- March 16 – Ismith Khan, Trinidad-born novelist (died 2002)
- March 21 – Peter Brook, English theatre director (died 2022)
- March 25 – Flannery O'Connor, American author (died 1964)
- March 27 – John Bayley, Indian-born English literary critic (died 2015)
- April 25 – Janete Clair, Brazilian television, radio play and novel writer (died 1983)
- May 1 – Mãe Stella de Oxóssi, Brazilian Ialorixá and writer (died 2018)
- May 4 – Beryl Te Wiata, New Zealand actor, author and scriptwriter (died 2017)
- May 25 – Rosario Castellanos, Mexican writer (died 1974)
- June 10 – Nat Hentoff, American historian, novelist, jazz and country music critic and syndicated columnist (died 2017)
- June 11 – William Styron, American writer (died 2006)
- June 15 – Attilâ İlhan, Turkish poet, novelist, essayist, journalist and reviewer (died 2005)
- June 16 – Jean d'Ormesson, French writer (died 2017)
- June 17 – Luce d'Eramo, Italian writer and literary critic (died 2001)
- June 25 – John Briley, American writer (d. 2019)
- July 4 – Ciril Zlobec, Slovene poet, writer, translator, journalist and politician (died 2018)
- July 5 – Jean Raspail, French writer (died 2020)
- July 13 – Huang Zongying, Chinese actress and writer (died 2020)
- July 19 – Jean-Pierre Faye, French philosopher, poet and writer (died 2026)
- July 26 – Ana María Matute, Spanish novelist (died 2014)
- August 1
  - Pam Gems, born Iris Pamela Price, English playwright (died 2011)
  - Ernst Jandl, Austrian writer, poet, and translator (died 2000)
- August 12
  - Donald Justice, American poet and educator (died 2004)
  - Thor Vilhjálmsson, Icelandic writer (died 2011)
- August 17 – John Hawkes, American novelist (died 1998)
- August 18 – Brian Aldiss, English science fiction author and editor (died 2017)
- August 25 – Thea Astley, Australian writer (died 2004)
- August 28
  - Philip Purser, English television critic and novelist (died 2022)
  - Arkady Strugatsky, Russian science fiction writer (died 1991)
- September 4 – Forrest Carter, American speechwriter and author (died 1979)
- September 6 – Andrea Camilleri, Italian novelist and playwright (died 2019)
- October 1
  - Christine Pullein-Thompson, English children's novelist (died 2005)
  - Diana Pullein-Thompson, English children's novelist (died 2015)
- October 1 – Abraham Louis Schneiders, Dutch writer and diplomat (died 2020)
- October 3 – Gore Vidal, American writer (died 2012)
- October 8 – Andrei Sinyavsky, Russian writer and dissident (died 1997)
- October 11 – Elmore Leonard, American novelist and screenwriter (died 2013)
- October 25 – Romek Marber, Polish-born book designer (died 2020)
- October 26 – Jan Wolkers, Dutch writer and artist (died 2007)
- October 29 – Dominick Dunne, American writer, investigative journalist and producer (died 2009)
- December 19 – Tankred Dorst, German dramatist (died 2017)

== Deaths ==
- January 4 – Elisabeth von Heyking, German novelist, travel writer and diarist (born 1861)
- January 27 – Friedrich von Hügel, Austrian theologian (born 1852)
- January 31 – George Washington Cable, American writer (born 1844)
- February 16 – Francisco Díaz-Silveira, Cuban journalist and poet (born 1871)
- March 2 – Luigj Gurakuqi, Albanian writer and politician (born 1879)
- March 26 – Hugo Bettauer, Austrian journalist and writer (born 1872)
- April 7 – Gerhard Gran, Norwegian literary historian, essayist and biographer (born 1856)
- April 8 – Emma Curtis Hopkins, American spiritual writer (born 1849)
- May 2 – Antun Branko Šimić, Croatian poet (born 1898)
- May 12 – Amy Lowell, American poet (born 1874)
- May 14 – H. Rider Haggard, British adventure novelist (b. 1856)
- June 6 – Pierre Louÿs, French poet (born 1870)
- July 13 – Margaret Dye Ellis, American social reformer, lobbyist, and correspondent (born 1845)
- July 15 – Mary Cholmondeley, English novelist (born 1859)
- July 16 – Pyotr Gnedich, Russian writer (born 1855)
- August 15 – George Barbu Știrbei, Romanian journalist, biographer and patron of the arts (born 1828)
- September 11 – Gustav Kastropp, German poet and librettist (born 1844)
- October 31 – José Ingenieros, Argentine positivist philosopher, essayist and physician (born 1877)
- October 7 – Felix Liebermann, German-Jewish historian (born 1851)
- October 27 – Darrell Figgis, Irish-born writer and politician, suicide (born 1882)
- c. November – Percy Hetherington Fitzgerald, Irish literary biographer, drama critic and sculptor (born 1834)
- December 5 – Władysław Reymont, Polish novelist, Nobel Prize winner (born 1867)
- December 15 – Emma B. Alrich, American journalist, author, and educator (born 1845)
- December 28 – Sergei Yesenin, Russian poet (born 1895)

== Awards ==
- James Tait Black Memorial Prize for fiction: Liam O'Flaherty, The Informer
- James Tait Black Memorial Prize for biography: Geoffrey Scott, The Portrait of Zelide
- Newbery Medal for children's literature: Charles Finger, Tales from Silver Lands
- Nobel Prize for Literature: George Bernard Shaw (awarded in 1926)
- Prix Goncourt: Maurice Genevoix, Raboliot
- Pulitzer Prize for Drama: Sidney Howard, They Knew What They Wanted
- Pulitzer Prize for Poetry: Edwin Arlington Robinson, The Man Who Died Twice
- Pulitzer Prize for the Novel: Edna Ferber, So Big
