= Albert Moses =

Sri Lankan-British actor (1937–2017)

Albert Moses KStJ
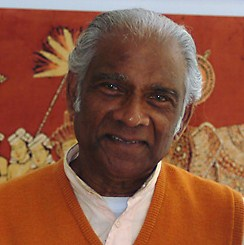
- Moses in 2005
- Born: 19 December 1937; Gampola, Kandy District, British Ceylon
- Died: 15 September 2017 (aged 79); London, England
- Burial place: St. Andrew's Church, Gampola, Sri Lanka
- Years active: 1970–2017
- Children: 3

Albert Moses KStJ (19 December 1937 – 15 September 2017) was a Sri Lankan actor based in the United Kingdom. He is best known for playing the role of Ranjeet Singh, a student in Jeremy Brown's EFL class in the British sitcom Mind Your Language and one of four students (along with Giovanni Capello, Juan Cervantes, and Anna Schmidt) to appear in all four series.

== Early life ==
He was born on 19 December 1937 in Gampola, Kandy. He started to work at the University of Ceylon, Peradeniya. Then he moved to Africa for employment and finally to London to learn drama and theatre.

== Career ==
In the 1960s, he began acting in India, where he appeared in several Bollywood films, then produced and directed his first film Gabriella. He then moved to Africa, where he undertook work on documentaries. From the early 1970s, in Britain, Moses played small parts in several television series before being cast as Ranjeet Singh in the ITV sitcom Mind Your Language (1977–1979, 1986), later producing 13 episodes. He also acted in many theater productions such as Freeway at National Theatre, Phædra Britannica with Dame Diana Rigg and Long March to Jerusalem at Watford Theater.

His final film was The Snarling (2018), in which he played tribute to his role in An American Werewolf in London (1981).

== Personal life ==
He was fluent in English, Arabic, Tamil, Sinhalese, moderate German and Sanskrit and excellent in fencing, dancing, singing, motor-cycle stunts, karate and judo. He was a Knight of the Order of St John.

== Death ==
Moses died in September 2017 in London at the age of 79. He was buried at St. Andrew's Church in his native Gampola, Sri Lanka.

== Selected credits ==
=== Theatre ===
- Freeway - National Theatre;
- Phædra Britannica - National Theatre (with Diana Rigg);
- Long March to Jerusalem - Watford Palace Theatre

=== Film ===
- White Cargo (1973) - Arab (uncredited)
- The Man Who Would Be King (1975, A John Huston film with Sean Connery, Michael Caine and Christopher Plummer) - Ghulam
- Stand Up, Virgin Soldiers (1977, EMI) - Indian shopkeeper
- The Spy Who Loved Me (1977, James Bond film) - Barman
- What's Up Nurse! (1978, a Derek Ford sex comedy) - 1st Asian
- Carry On Emmannuelle (1978, Rank) - Doctor
- The Awakening (1980, Columbia Pictures) - (uncredited)
- An American Werewolf in London (1981, a John Landis movie) - Hospital Porter
- The Great Quest - with Oliver Reed;
- Pink Floyd: The Wall (1982, Alan Parker film) - Janitor
- Octopussy (1983, James Bond film) - Saddrudin - undercover British agent in India
- Al-Mas' Ala Al-Kubra (1983) - Indian officer (uncredited)
- Scandalous (1984, with Sir John Gielgud and Pamela Stephenson) - Vishnu
- The Little Drummer Girl (1984, EMI, a George Roy Hill film) - Green Grocer
- Foreign Body (1986) - Paramedic #2
- The Second Jungle Book: Mowgli and Baloo (1997, Columbia Pictures) - Conductor
- East Is East (1999, a BAFTA award-winning Film4 production) - Abdul Karim
- The Snarling (2018) - Hospital Patient

=== Television ===
- Queenie - Hollywood mini-series with Kirk Douglas;
- On the Buses - London Weekend Television;
- Warship - BBC television drama;
- Minder - Thames Television Drama sitcom - Appeared in Series 5 Episode 2 "What Makes Shamy Run";
- Robin's Nest - Thames Television sitcom;
- Mind Your Language - London Weekend Television sitcom (nearly 50 episodes broadcast between 1977 and 1986);
- Juliet Bravo - BBC television drama;
- The Jewel in the Crown - Granada Television (4 episodes, with Charles Dance, OBE);
- The Little and Large Show - BBC television comedy;
- The Benny Hill Show - Thames Television comedy;
- Boon - ITV Central drama;
- The Bill - talkbackTHAMES television drama (5 episodes);
- Never the Twain - Thames Television sitcom;
- The Adventures of Sherlock Holmes: The Man With the Twisted Lip - Granada Television;
- London's Burning - London Weekend Television drama;
- Tandoori Nights - Channel 4
- Crocodile Shoes (Adrian Lynn's accountant)

=== Other ===
- Mind Your Language - Producer (13 Episodes)
- Tales from India, The hawk and the turtles, and Mustapha Mouse goes to the city - Publisher
- A Collection of Poems - Publisher
