= Smoky (1946 film) =

Western film by Louis King

- Film poster
- Directed by: Louis King
- Screenplay by: Lillie Hayward; Dwight Cummins; Dorothy Yost
- Based on: Smoky the Cowhorse by Will James
- Produced by: Robert Bassler
- Starring: Fred MacMurray; Anne Baxter; Bruce Cabot
- Cinematography: Charles G. Clarke
- Edited by: Nick DeMaggio
- Music by: David Raksin
- Color process: Technicolor
- Production company: 20th Century Fox
- Distributed by: 20th Century Fox
- Release date: June 26, 1946
- Running time: 87 minutes
- Country: United States
- Language: English
- Budget: $1.3 million
- Box office: $4 million (U.S. and Canada rentals)

Smoky is a 1946 American Western film directed by Louis King and starring Fred MacMurray, Anne Baxter and Bruce Cabot. The film was produced and distributed by 20th Century Fox. It is the second of three film adaptations of the 1926 novel Smoky the Cowhorse by Will James; others were made in 1933 and 1966.

== Plot ==
A cowboy riding alone in Utah witnesses a stampede of wild stallions, one of whom particularly catches his eye. He returns the horse to its rightful owner, Julie Richards, owner of the Rocking R Ranch, introducing himself as Clint Barkley and asking for a job.

The wild horse, Smoky, slowly develops a relationship with Clint, but ranch foreman Jeff doesn't trust the new hired hand, who is vague and mysterious about his past. A stranger arrives named Frank and persuades a reluctant Clint to vouch for him to be hired as a wrangler.

It turns out Clint took the blame for a crime Frank committed and served eight months behind bars. Frank begins causing trouble at the ranch, mistreating Smoky and the other horses. A gambler turns up, seeking Clint's payment for a $200 debt, discovering that Frank actually lost the money and forged Clint's name on the IOU.

Frank rustles the horses and rides off. Jeff remains suspicious until Clint finally reveals that Frank is his brother. Smoky, abused again, fights off Frank and ends up killing him. Other cowboys discover the horse and sell him to a rodeo in Cheyenne. The horse's condition deteriorates and he ends up pulling a junk cart. One day Clint rides into town and Smoky recognizes him. They are reunited, and return to Julie and the ranch.

== Cast ==
- Fred MacMurray as Clint Barkley
- Anne Baxter as Julie Richards
- Bruce Cabot as Frank Denton
- Esther Dale as Gram
- Roy Roberts as Jeff
- J. Farrell MacDonald as Jim
- Burl Ives as Willie

== Production ==
Parts of the film were shot in Utah: Zion National Park, Kanab Race Track, Cave Lakes, Aspen Mirror Lake, the Gap, Rockville Road, Kanab Canyon, Ogden, and Cedar Breaks. Fredonia, Arizona, Cheyenne, Wyoming, and Burbank and Saugus, California were also filming locations.

== See also ==
- List of films about horses
