= Smoky the Cowhorse =

1926 children's book by Will James

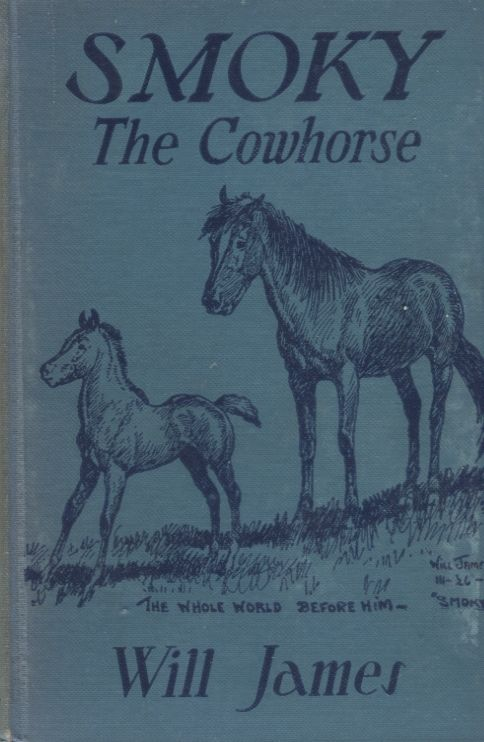
- Author: Will James
- Language: English
- Genre: Children's novel
- Publisher: Charles Scribner’s Sons
- Publication date: 1926
- Publication place: United States
- Media type: Print (Hardback & Paperback)
- Text: Smoky the Cowhorse at Wikisource

Smoky the Cowhorse is a novel by Will James that was the winner of the 1927 Newbery Medal.

== Plot ==
The story details the life of a horse in the western United States from his birth to his eventual decline. It takes place after the year 1910, during which the West dies away and automobiles are introduced. Smoky is born in the wild but is captured and trained by a cowboy named Clint. Clint is taken by Smoky's intelligence and spirit, and he uses him as his personal saddle horse. Under his guidance, Smoky soon becomes known as the best cow horse around. Later on, Smoky is among a number of horses stolen by a horse thief. When Smoky refuses to allow the thief to ride him, being loyal only to Clint, he is beaten repeatedly in punishment. Developing an intense hatred for humans from this treatment, Smoky eventually attacks and kills the thief.

When Smoky is later captured by local authorities, his now violent and aggressive demeanor prompts his use as a bucking bronco at a rodeo. Under the moniker of "The Cougar", he becomes the most famous rodeo attraction in the South West, and people come from miles away to attempt to ride him. Years of performing at the rodeo eventually take their toll on his body and spirit, and he is left a shell of his former self.

As he is no longer of any use as a rodeo horse, he is renamed "Cloudy" and used as a riding horse, then later sold to an abusive man who starves him. During this time, Clint finally reunites with Smoky. While in town on business, Clint spots and recognizes the horse. After having Smoky's current owner arrested for his acts of cruelty, Clint reclaims him and takes him home with him. Although Clint initially despairs at the condition Smoky is in, his careful treatment of the horse begins to show results. In the end, Smoky has completely recovered his former health and personality.

== Film adaptations ==
The novel has been adapted to the screen three times as Smoky, in 1933, 1946, and 1966. Will James himself appears in the 1933 film as a narrator.

== Other information ==
Will James expressed surprise at winning the Newbery Medal for Smoky the Cowhorse, since the book was published for adults. An illustrated edition of Smoky the Cowhorse was issued in 1929.

James loosely based the book on his first horse, Smoky, who was born in the Huff's cabin, near Val Marie, Saskatchewan, where James learned wrangling and lived for three years before moving to the United States.

In the 1982 film Tex, lead character Tex McCormick refers to Smoky the Cowhorse as his favorite book.

The 2005 Nobel Memorial Prize winner, economist and professor Thomas Schelling said the most influential book he ever read was Smoky the Cowhorse. “He’d say it was the first time he understood empathy for other human beings".

Awards
Preceded by Shen of the Sea	Newbery Medal recipient 1927	Succeeded by Gay Neck, the Story of a Pigeon
