= Charles Finger =

American writer (1869–1941)

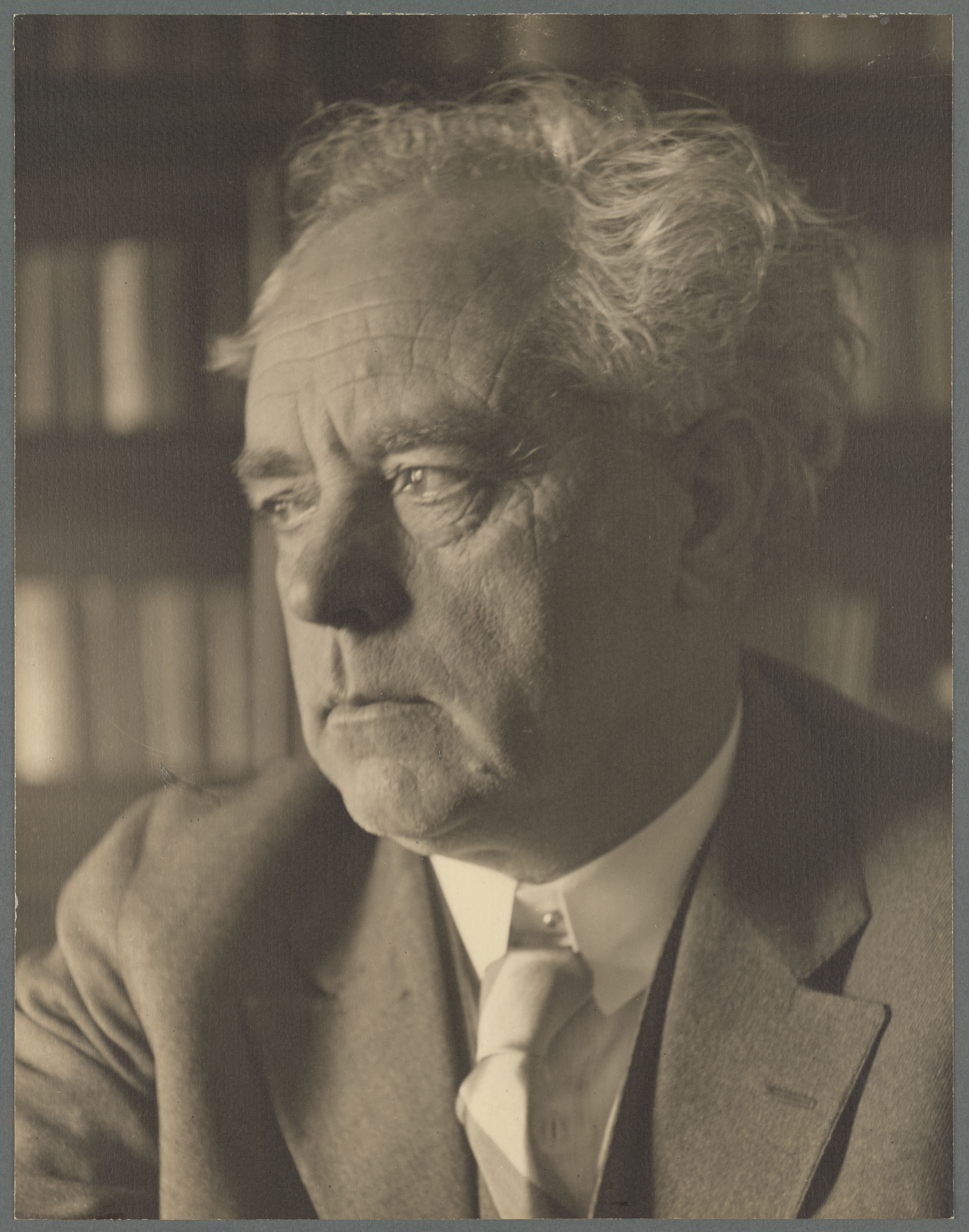
- Portrait of Charles Finger by Robert Hobart Davis
- Born: December 25, 1869; Willesden, England
- Died: January 7, 1941 (aged 71); Farmington, Arkansas
- Occupations: Writer (novelist), musician
- Writing career
- Period: 20th century
- Genre: Juvenile fiction

Charles Joseph Finger (December 25, 1869 – January 7, 1941) was a British born American writer. He also directed an orchestra and taught piano.

== Biography ==
Finger was born in Willesden, England, and educated at King's College London. He had a strong literary and musical formation, and was quite active in the Fabian movement. Finger was a keen disciple of Walt Whitman. As a youth and young man he reveled in the homosociality of the Regent Street Polytechnic created by Quintin Hogg, and as a bisexual, throughout his life he sought to create communities of like-minded readers. Intrinsic to his literary accomplishments were his future life in South America and Texas, and his love of men. At age 20 he began to travel extensively, visiting first Tierra del Fuego and Patagonia, where he worked as gold seeker, guide, and cook for the first sheep farming stations, in the period of Selknam genocide. He moved to New York and London, thereafter, and to a number of cities in Texas. He worked as an accountant and musician, eventually settling in Fayetteville, Arkansas, where he began to concentrate on writing.

In 1902, Finger married Eleanor (Nellie) Ferguson, daughter of a sheep rancher, with whom he would have five children.

He became the acting editor of the Reedy's Mirror after William Marion Reedy's death in 1920.

Finger won the 1925 Newbery Medal for the book Tales from Silver Lands (1924), a collection of stories from Central and South America. Some of his other works are Bushrangers (1924), Tales Worth Telling (1927), Courageous Companions (1929), and A Dog at His Heel (1936). His autobiography is Seven Horizons (1930).

Finger was an accomplished musician. He directed the San Angelo Conservatory of Music in Texas, from 1898 to 1904. One of his piano students in San Angelo was David Wendel Guion, who achieved notability for arranging and popularizing the ballad "Home on the Range".

Finger, whose daughter Helen Finger was a lithographer, took special pains to promote the work of Arkansas painter and lithographer James Duard Marshall. Helen Finger and James Duard Marshall had worked together teaching adult art classes in Fayetteville, Arkansas, under the Federal Emergency Relief Act.

The epitaph on Finger's gravestone is "This voyage done, set sail and steer once more To further landfall on some nobler shore." He is buried in the Farmington, Arkansas cemetery.

== Literary works ==
- Choice Of The Crowd, (1921)
- The Ice Age, (1922)
- Joseph Addison And His Time, (1922)
- Lost Civilizations, (1922)
- Historic Crimes And Criminals, (1922)
- Oscar Wilde In Outline, (c1922)
- Henry David Thoreau: The Man Who Escaped from the Herd (1922)
- Mahomet, (1923)
- Hints On Writing One-Act Plays, (1923)
- Highwaymen: A Book Of Gallant Rogues, (1923)
- The Tragic Story Of Oscar Wilde's Life, (1923)
- The Essence Of Confucianism, (1923)
- Book Of Real Adventures, (1924)
- Free Fantasia On Books And Reading, (1924)
- Mark Twain: The Philosopher Who Laughed At The World, (1924)
- The Travels Of Marco Polo, (1924)
- Life Of Barnum, The Man Who Lured The Herd, (1924)
- Great Pirates, (1924)
- Magellan And The Pacific, (1924)
- Life Of Theodore Roosevelt, (1924)
- Bushrangers, (1924)
- Tales From Silver Lands, (1924)
- In Lawless Lands, (1924)
- Robin Hood And His Merry Men, (1924)
- The Gist Of Burton's Anatomy Of Melancholy, (1924)
- A Book Of Strange Murders, (1925)
- David Livingstone: Explorer And Prophet, (1927)
- Romantic Rascals, (1927)
- The Spreading Stain, (1927)
- Frontier Ballads, (1927)
- Tales Worth Telling, (1927)
- Courageous Companions, (1929)
- A Man For A' That: The Story Of Robert Burns, (1929)
- Seven Horizons, (1930)
- Adventure Under Sapphire Skies, (1931)
- A Paul Bunyan Geography, (1931)
- The Affair At The Inn, (1931)
- Foot-Loose In The West, (1932)
- The Magic Tower, (1933)
- After The Great Companions, (1934)
- The Distant Prize, (1935)
- A Dog At His Heel, (1936)
- Valiant Vagabonds, (1936)
- Our Navy: An Outline History For Young People, (1936)
- When Guns Thundered At Tripoli, (1937)
- Bobbie And Jock And The Mailman, (1938)
- Give A Man A Horse, (1938)
- Cape Horn Snorter: A Story Of War Of 1812, (1939)
- Golden Tales From Far Away, (1940)
- The Yankee Captain In Patagonia, (1941)
- High Water In Arkansas, (1943)

Awards
Preceded by Charles Hawes	Newbery Medal winner 1925	Succeeded by Arthur Bowie Chrisman
