= Tales from Silver Lands =

1925 folktale collection by Charles Finger

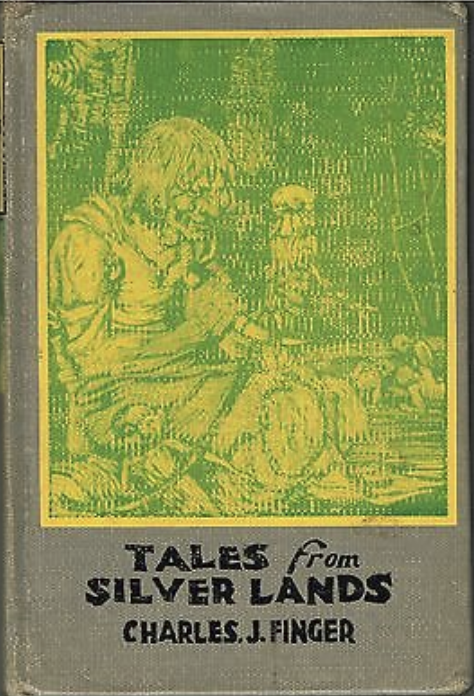
- Author: Charles Finger
- Language: English
- Genre: Children's novel
- Publisher: Doubleday
- Publication date: 1924
- Publication place: United States
- Media type: Print (hardback & paperback)

Tales from Silver Lands is a book by Charles Finger that won the Newbery Medal in 1925.

The book is a collection of nineteen folktales of the native populations of Central and South America. Collected during Finger's travels, it was one of the first volumes of South American indigenous folktales available to children. Finger also includes information about how the tales were told, including some cultural norms, and any items used in telling the story.

Awards
Preceded by The Dark Frigate	Newbery Medal recipient 1925	Succeeded by Shen of the Sea
