= Diana Hyland =

American actress (1936–1977)

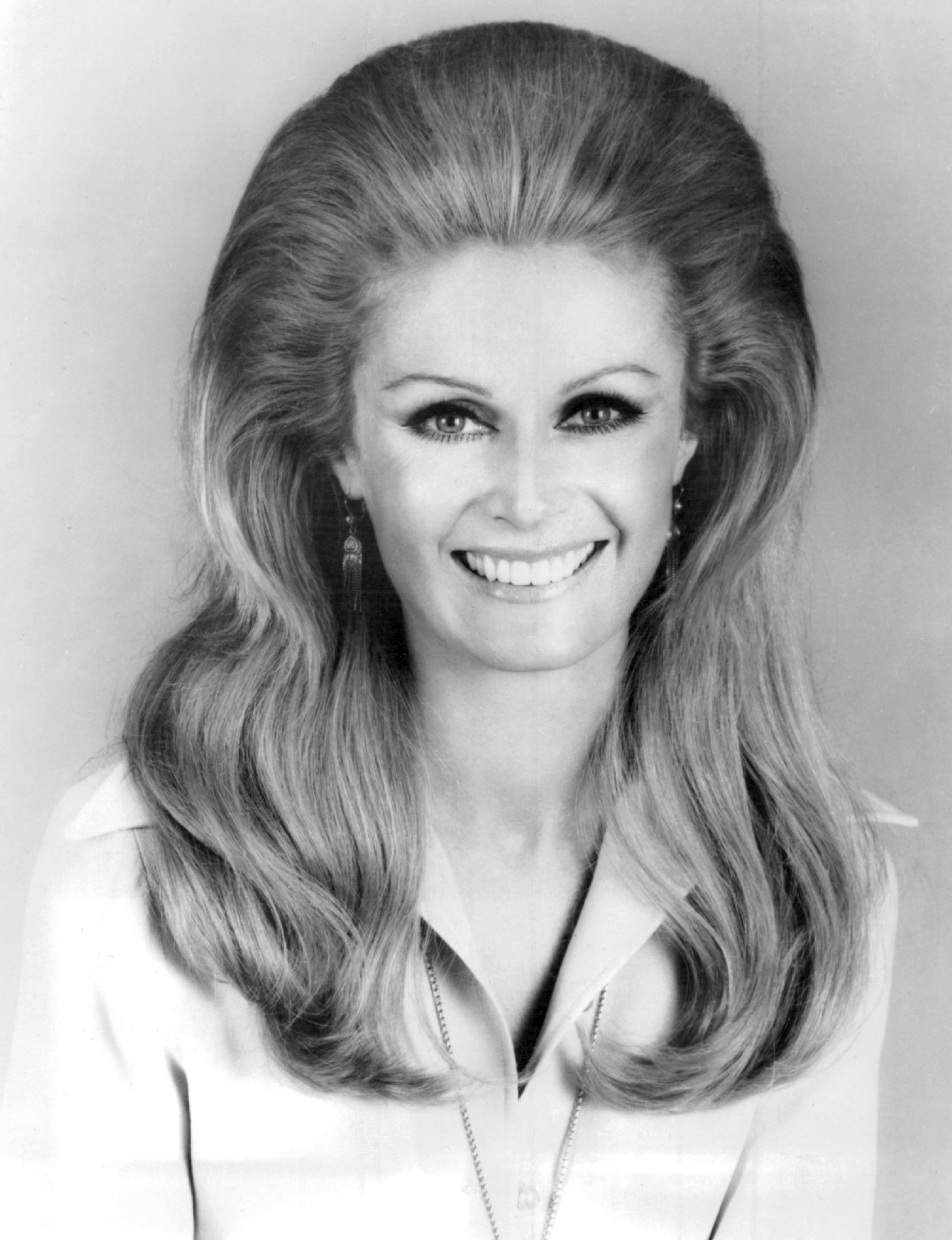
- Hyland as Susan Winter in Peyton Place, 1968
- Born: Diane Gentner; January 25, 1936; Cleveland Heights, Ohio, U.S.
- Died: March 27, 1977 (aged 41); Los Angeles, California, U.S.
- Occupation: Actress
- Years active: 1955–1977
- Spouse: Joe Goodson (m. 1969; div. 1974)
- Partner: John Travolta (1976–1977; her death)
- Children: 1
- Awards: Emmy Award for Outstanding Performance by a Supporting Actress in a Comedy or Drama Special; 1977 The Boy in the Plastic Bubble; awarded posthumously

Diana Hyland (born Diane Gentner; January 25, 1936 – March 27, 1977) was an American stage, film, and television actress.

== Early years ==
Hyland was born Diane Gentner to John Theodore and Mary (Gorman) Gentner in Cleveland Heights, Ohio. She had one sibling, a brother, John Gorman Gentner.

== Career ==
She made her acting debut in 1955 at age 19 in an episode of Robert Montgomery Presents. Over the next decade, she appeared often in guest and supporting roles in various television series, including Naked City, The Eleventh Hour, The Fugitive, The Invaders, The Green Hornet, and The Twilight Zone, and she was cast in the feature film The Chase (1966) with Marlon Brando, Jane Fonda, and Robert Redford.

In 1959, she originated the role of Heavenly Finley in Tennessee Williams' Sweet Bird of Youth on Broadway, appearing with Geraldine Page and Paul Newman.

In 1966, she co-starred in the movie Smoky in which she played Julie Richards, owner of the Rockin' R Ranch, who falls in love with Clint Barkeley (Fess Parker), owner of Smoky, a black stallion turned cutting horse. The same year she appeared in an episode of the TV series The Man from U.N.C.L.E. titled "The Candidate's Wife Affair" and in another episode titled "The Nowhere Affair". From 1958 to 1963, Hyland was a regular on the NBC soap opera Young Doctor Malone, playing Gig Houseman, wife of the younger Dr. Malone.

Hyland's debut in a feature film was in One Man's Way (1963), playing the wife of Norman Vincent Peale. She had a continuing role as Susan Winter in the prime-time soap opera Peyton Place from 1968 to 1969. She appeared in the 1976 television movie The Boy in the Plastic Bubble, for which she won a posthumous Emmy Award. The following year, she co-starred with Dick Van Patten in the series Eight Is Enough. She appeared in only four episodes before her death, and her character, Joan Bradford, was subsequently killed off.

== Personal life ==
Hyland married actor Joe Goodson on April 24, 1969. The couple had one son, Zachary, born in July 1973. Hyland and Goodson divorced in August 1974.

She began a romantic relationship with actor John Travolta, 18 years her junior, in 1976 after meeting him when she played his mother in the television movie The Boy in the Plastic Bubble.

== Death ==
Hyland was diagnosed with breast cancer in 1975, and underwent a mastectomy and chemotherapy . However, the cancer spread and her health continued to deteriorate. Hyland and Travolta remained together until her death at age 41 on March 27, 1977, in Los Angeles. She died with Travolta, Eight Is Enough co-star Dick Van Patten, and his wife Patty by her side.

== Filmography ==
=== Film ===
Year	Title	Role
1963	One Man's Way	Ruth Stafford Peale
1966	The Chase	Elizabeth Rogers
1966	Smoky	Julie Richards
1968	Jigsaw	Sarah

=== Television ===
Year	Title	Role	Notes
1955	Robert Montgomery Presents	Judy	Season 6 Episode 38: "Second Chance"
1956	Star Tonight	(1) Louise	(1) Season 2 Episode 32: "Two Windows" (2) Season 2 Episode 48: "Will Power"
1956–1958	Kraft Television Theatre	(2) Deputy's Girlfriend (3) Laura	(1) Season 10 Episode 1: "Out to Kill" (1956) (2) Season 10 Episode 48: "Ride into Danger" (1957) (3) Season 11 Episode 34: "The Last of the Belles" (1958)
1957	The Alcoa Hour	Isabel	Season 2 Episode 14: "The Big Build-Up"
1960–1961	Play of the Week	(1) Mabel (2) Estelle (No Exit) (3) Helen	(1) Season 1 Episode 21: "Climate of Eden" (1960) (2) Season 2 Episode 23: "No Exit/The Indifferent Lover" (1961) (3) Season 2 Episode 27: "A Cool Wind Over the Living" (1961)
1961–1962	Young Doctor Malone	Gig Houseman Malone	
1962	The Defenders	Mary DiFalco Robinson	Season 2 Episode 5: "The Unwanted"
1962	The United States Steel Hour		Season 10 Episode 4: "Wanted: Someone Innocent"
1962	Alcoa Premiere	Liza Laurents	Season 2 Episode 4: "The Voice of Charlie Pont"
1962	Sam Benedict	Donna Heistand	Season 1 Episode 10: "The Bird of Warning"
1963	Ben Casey	Greta Bauer	Season 2 Episode 22: "Rigadoon for Three Pianos"
1963	Stoney Burke	Eileen Fowler	Season 1 Episode 22: "To Catch the Kaiser"
1963	The DuPont Show of the Week	Ellen Graham	Season 2 Episode 14: "The Shark"
1963	Naked City	Vivian North	Season 4 Episode 25: "Stop the Parade! A Baby Is Crying!"
1963	Wagon Train	Kitty Pryer	Season 7 Episode 10: "The Kitty Pryer Story"
1963–1964	The Alfred Hitchcock Hour	(1) Janet Nelson (2) Grace Renford	(1) Season 1 Episode 19: "To Catch a Butterfly" (1963) (2) Season 2 Episode 14: "Beyond the Sea of Death" (1964)
1963–1965	Dr. Kildare	(1) Dr. Lilith McGraw (2) Marguerite Williams	(1) Season 2 Episode 14: "Love Is a Sad Song" (1963) (2) Season 4 Episode 18: "Please Let My Baby Live" (1965)
1964	Twilight Zone	Anne Henderson	Season 5 Episode 21: "Spur of the Moment"
1964	The Eleventh Hour	Madelyn Marner	Season 2 Episode 23: "A Full Moon Every Night"
1964	Kraft Suspense Theatre	Laura DeLinda Stevenson / Laura Murdoch	Season 1 Episode 24: "The Sweet Taste of Vengeance"
1964–1967	The Fugitive	(1) Carol Hollister (2) Stella Savano (3) Penny (4) Alison Priestley	(1) Season 2 Episode 4: "When the Bough Breaks" (1964) (2) Season 3 Episode 11: "Set Fire to a Straw Man" (1965) (3) Season 4 Episode 12: "The Devil's Disciples" (1966) (4) Season 4 Episode 26: "Dossier on a Diplomat" (1967)
1965	Burke's Law	Celeste Martel	Season 2 Episode 21: "Run for the Money"
1965	The Nurses	Dr. Mai Lind	Season 3 Episode 25: "The April Thaw of Doctor Mai"
1965	Hercules and the Princess of Troy	Princess Diana	TV movie
1965	Convoy	Lieutenant Katya Katrovich	Season 1 Episode 7: "Katya"
1965	The Wackiest Ship in the Army	Margaret Cochran	Season 1 Episode 2: "The Sisters"; Season 1 Episode 14: "I'm Dreaming of a Wide Isthmus"
1965–1966	Run for Your Life	(1) Ellen Henderson (2) Diana Hays	(1) Season 1 Episode 2: "The Girl Next Door Is a Spy" (1965) (2) Season 2 Episode 2: "I Am the Late Diana Hays" (1966)
1966	Bob Hope Presents the Chrysler Theatre	Mrs. Collier	Season 3 Episode 15: "Guilty or Not Guilty"
1966	Scalplock	Marta Grenier	TV movie (pilot for the TV series Iron Horse)
1966	A Man Called Shenandoah	Nancy Pruitt	Season 1 Episode 30: "An Unfamiliar Tune"
1966	Iron Horse	Marta Grenier	Season 1 Episode 1: "Rail Runs West" (aired September 12, 1966); Episode: "Joy Unconfined" (adapted and changed from "Rail Runs West")
1966	I Spy	Marisa Terizcu	Season 2 Episode 1: "So Coldly Sweet"
1966	The Green Hornet	Attorney Claudia Bromley	Season 1 Episode 2: "Give 'Em Enough Rope"
1966	Twelve O'Clock High	Heidi Voss	Season 3 Episode 6: "Practice to Deceive"
1966	The Man from U.N.C.L.E.	(1) Mara (2) Miranda Bryant / Irina	(1) Season 2 Episode 24: "The Nowhere Affair" (2) Season 3 Episode 8: "The Candidate's Wife Affair"
1966	Felony Squad	Cloris Harte	Season 1 Episode 10: "Killer with a Badge"
1967	Tarzan	Diana Russell	Season 2 Episode 7: "The Fanatics"
1967	The Invaders	(1) Sherri Vikor (2) (3) Ellie Markham	(1) Season 1 Episode 5: "Vikor" (2) Season 2 Episode 9: "Summit Meeting, Part I" (3) Season 2 Episode 10: "Summit Meeting, Part II"
1967–1972	The F.B.I.	(1) Marie-Louise Karn (2) Virginia Lamberth (3) Joanne Kenster (4) Pat Laner	(1) Season 2 Episode 22: "The Hostage" (1967) (2) Season 3 Episode 8: "Overload" (1967) (3) Season 6 Episode 16: "The Stalking Horse" (1971) (4) Season 7 Episode 20: "Arrangement with Terror" (1972)
1968	Judd, for the Defense	Jessie Tree	Season 1 Episode 17: "Fall of a Skylark: Part 1 – The Trial"; Season 1 Episode 18: "Fall of a Skylark: Part 2 – The Appeal"
1968–1969	Peyton Place	Susan Winter	56 episodes
1969	The Name of the Game	Lisa Adrian	Season 2 Episode 8: "The Perfect Image"
1970	Ritual of Evil	Leila Barton	TV movie
1970	Bracken's World	Mary Draper	Season 2 Episode 6: "The Mary Tree"
1971	Ironside	Hrûska Pazoureck	Season 4 Episode 16: "From Hrûska, with Love"
1971	The Interns	Writer	Season 1 Episode 19: "Casualty"
1971	Alias Smith and Jones	Clara Philips	Season 1 Episode 7: "Return to Devil's Hole"
1971	Dan August	Phyllis Hendricks	Season 1 Episode 24: "Days of Rage"
1971	Medical Center	Susan	Season 3 Episode 10: "Suspected"
1971–1975	Marcus Welby, M.D.	(1) Cynthia Crowley (2) (3) Janet Trent	(1) Season 2 Episode 19: "Cynthia" (1971) (2) Season 6 Episode 15: "Dark Fury: Part 1" (1975) (3) Season 6 Episode 16: "Dark Fury: Part 2" (1975)
1972	Banyon	Julia Egan	Season 1 Episode 3: "The Graveyard Vote"
1973	Search	Anjeanette Marie Shanahan	Season 1 Episode 12: "Let Us Prey"
1973	Gunsmoke	Dallas Fair	Season 18 Episode 17: "Shadler"
1973	Owen Marshall: Counselor at Law	Lita Coleman	Season 2 Episode 22: "Final Semester"
1973	The ABC Afternoon Playbreak		Season 2 Episode 1: "The Things I Never Said"
1974	Hawkins	Jennifer Pearson	Season 1 Episode 7: "Candidate for Murder"
1974	Medical Center	Pat Londean	Season 6 Episode 4: "Three-Cornered Cage"
1975	Harry O	Sandra Dawes	Season 1 Episode 16: "The Confetti People"
1975	Mannix	Janice Graham	Season 8 Episode 17: "A Ransom for Yesterday"
1975	S.W.A.T.	Joanna Bishop	Season 2 Episode 3: "Kill S.W.A.T."
1975	Cannon	Nedra Cameron	Season 5 Episode 10: "The Melted Man"
1976	Kojak	Cleo Donatello	Season 3 Episode 19: "A Grave Too Soon"
1976	Barnaby Jones	Nora Bradford	Season 4 Episode 20: "Deadly Reunion"
1976	The Boy in the Plastic Bubble	Mickey Lubitch	TV movie
1977	Happy Days	Adrianna Prescott	Season 4 Episode 12: "Fonzie's Old Lady"
1977	Eight Is Enough	Joan Bradford	(1) Season 1 Episode 1: "Never Try Eating Nectarines Since Juice May Dispense" (2) Season 1 Episode 2: "Schussboomer" (3) Season 1 Episode 3: "Pieces of Eight" (4) Season 1 Episode 5: "Turnabout"
