= The Dark Frigate =

1923 children's novel by Charles Hawes

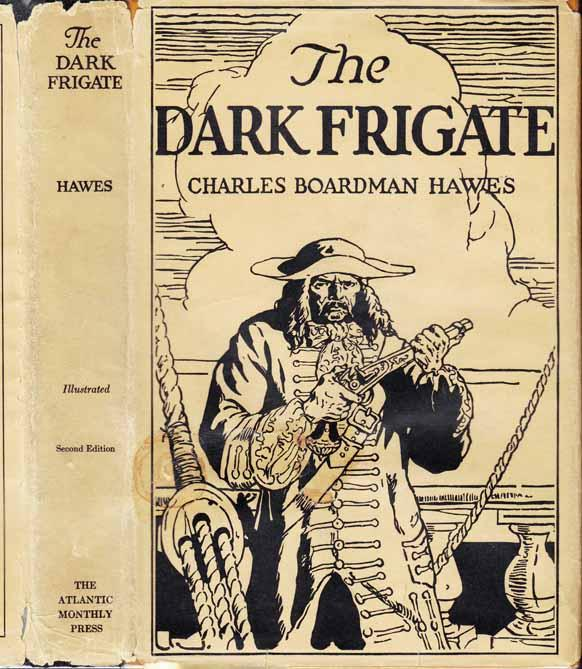
- Second edition dust jacket
- Author: Charles Hawes
- Cover artist: Warren Chappell
- Language: English
- Genre: Historical novel
- Publisher: Little, Brown
- Publication date: 1923
- Publication place: United States
- Media type: Print (Hardcover & Paperback)

The Dark Frigate is a 1923 children's historical novel written by Charles Hawes. It won the 1924 Newbery Medal. It was the third, and final, novel written by Hawes, who died shortly before its publication, making him the only author to be awarded the Newbery Medal posthumously.

== Plot ==
The book opens in 17th century London. Philip Marsham, a nineteen-year-old sailor, has just been orphaned when his father's ship was lost at sea. An accident with a gun causes him to flee London, leaving behind the small inheritance left by his father. He decides to journey across England on foot, heading towards Bideford. During his travels, he encounters Sir John Bristol, a local Lord who greatly impresses the young man. He also encounters two men, Tom Jordan and Martin Barwick, who claim to be fellow sailors. Tom, who is more commonly known as the Old One, soon parts company with them; however, Martin becomes Phil's traveling companion. When they reach Bideford, Martin leads the way to the house of Mother Taylor, an old woman who works as the go-between for numerous illegal activities. She informs them that the Old One has already gone ahead on a ship without them, but arranges positions for Martin and Phil on a frigate, known as the Rose of Devon.

Once aboard the frigate, Phil quickly impresses the captain with his skills. When the boatswain is killed in an accident, Phil is promoted to replace him. After a violent storm, the crew of the Rose of Devon encounters a wrecked ship. While rescuing the survivors, Phil is surprised to see that they are coincidentally led by the Old One. Although the Old One and his followers initially put on a mask of friendliness, they soon reveal their true nature as pirates, killing the Rose's captain and seizing control of the ship. Tempted by the promise of vast riches, the majority of the Rose's former crew willingly join the Old One. Only Phil and Will Canty, a fellow sailor of the same age, show reluctance to become pirates. Having taken an immediate liking to Phil, the Old One allows him to keep his position as boatswain, hoping to convince him to join them willingly.

The newly formed band of pirates attempt several raids against other ships, but none of them go well, and they end up gaining very little. During an attempted attack against a small island town, Will Canty takes the opportunity to escape in attempt to find help. Unfortunately, he is soon recaptured by the pirates, who later torture and kill him. Seeing his friend murdered is the last straw for Phil, who shortly afterwards attempts his own escape. Fleeing to a nearby island, he sees another ship anchored nearby. When he swims out to it to investigate, he discovers that it is a British warship, but is captured by its crew. He manages to convince them of the nearby pirate ship, and thus forewarned, they are easily able to defeat the Old One and his crew, and capture the Rose of Devon. Unfortunately, the British captain is unconvinced of Phil's innocence, believing instead that he was a pirate spy who, once captured, sold out his friends in an attempt to gain his freedom. Phil is arrested with the rest of the pirate crew and taken back to England for trial.

During the trial, it seems certain that the entire crew, including Phil, will be found guilty and hanged. When he is called to the stand to defend himself, Phil insists again that he was an unwilling participant in the pirates' activities. However, when he is asked to testify against the rest of the Rose's crew, he refuses on the grounds that even if it was forced upon him, they were still his companions. Impressed by Phil's courage and honor, the Old One testifies on his behalf, declaring to the court that Phil is indeed innocent of the charges against him. At the conclusion of the trial, Phil alone is acquitted. The pirate crew is executed shortly after, with only the Old One retaining his bold face until the end.

After regaining his freedom, Phil journeys back to the lands of Sir John Bristol, and asks the lord to be let into his service. Phil becomes one of Sir John's closest companions for several years, and serves under him during the English Civil War on the side of the Royalists. Although Phil rises through the ranks during the war, the forces of Oliver Cromwell eventually emerge victorious, and Sir John is killed in battle. Growing weary of England, Phil decides to leave the country, and once again travels to the docks at Bideford. He is shocked to find the Rose of Devon among the ships there, and, after speaking with her new captain, books passage to Barbados.

== Characters ==
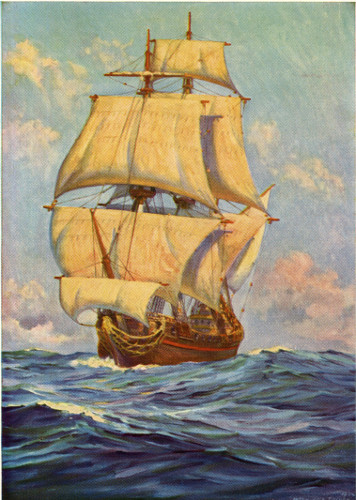
Frontispiece of the first edition, depicting the ship of the title.

- Philip Marsham - The nineteen-year-old protagonist of the story. He was raised alone by his sailor father, and thus has had experience on ships since he was a small child. He becomes an unwilling member of a crew of pirates when the ship he is serving on is taken over by the Old One and his followers.
- Tom Jordan - More commonly known as the Old One, he is the primary antagonist of the book, and the leader of the band of pirates that took over the Rose of Devon. Although he is violent, cruel, and prone to fits of extreme fury, he is also shown to be courageous and to possess a commanding personality. The book's narration states that he possessed all of the traits of leadership, and had he been born in another time, he very likely may have become a great naval hero instead of a pirate.
- Martin Barwick - A man whom Phil encounters on the road to Bideford, who becomes his travelling companion. He is part of the Old One's crew of pirates, and assists in the capture of the Rose of Devon. Martin is a cowardly, incompetent man, and is often the target of ridicule by the rest of the crew.
- Will Canty - A young sailor, around the same age as Phil. The two become good friends, and, like Phil, Will detests the crew of pirates. Although he attempts several counts of sabotage against the pirates in secret, the Old One is well aware of his activities. When an attempt to escape for help is thwarted, he is tortured and killed.
- Sir John Bristol - A minor lord that Phil encounters early in the book. Despite their brief meeting, Phil is immediately impressed by the knight, who reminds him of his father. After his adventures on the Rose of Devon come to an end, Phil returns to Sir John's estate, and serves with him through the English Civil War. Sir John is killed at the Second Battle of Newbury.

== Reception ==
In The Elementary English Review, Marion Lovis praised the book, highlighting both the technical knowledge and strong characters Hawes displayed in his writing.

Awards
Preceded by The Voyages of Doctor Dolittle	Newbery Medal recipient 1924	Succeeded by Tales from Silver Lands
