= Smoky (1966 film) =

1966 film by George Sherman

- Directed by: George Sherman
- Screenplay by: Harold Medford; Lillie Hayward; Dwight Cummins; Dorothy Yost
- Based on: Smoky the Cowhorse by Will James
- Produced by: Aaron Rosenberg
- Starring: Fess Parker; Diana Hyland; Katy Jurado; Hoyt Axton
- Cinematography: Jack Swain
- Edited by: Joseph Silver
- Music by: Leith Stevens
- Color process: Color by DeLuxe
- Production company: Arcola Pictures
- Distributed by: 20th Century Fox
- Release dates: August 3, 1966 (St. Louis, Missouri)
- Running time: 103 minutes
- Country: United States
- Language: English

Smoky is a 1966 American Western film, directed by George Sherman and starring Fess Parker, Diana Hyland, Katy Jurado and Hoyt Axton. The third of three film adaptations of the 1926 novel Smoky the Cowhorse by Will James, it utilizes the screenplay from the 1946 film.

It earned rentals in the US and Canada of $4 million.

== Plot ==
A cowboy finds, captures, and patiently trains a black wild stallion. They develop a bond that is ultimately unbreakable. The cowboy's brother, however, needing money to pay off gambling debts signed in his brother's name, tries to trade the horse sneakily. While trying to sneak him out of his pen at night, the horse senses something is wrong and struggles against the brother and in the process accidentally kills him, before running off. The cowboy goes looking for him, fearing others will kill the horse over its reputation. Sadly he does not find him. The cowboy joins the Marines shortly after and the horse eventually is sold to perform on the rodeo circuit and then to a junk dealer. After the cowboy returns from military service, he sets out to find his beloved horse and the pair is soon reunited. A love story between the cowboy and the female ranch owner plays out under the radar.

== Cast ==
- Fess Parker as Clint
- Diana Hyland as Julie
- Katy Jurado as Maria
- Hoyt Axton as Fred
- Robert J. Wilke as Jeff
- Armando Silvestre as Gordon
- Jose Hector Galindo as Manuel
- Jorge Martínez de Hoyos as Pepe
- Ted White as Abbott
- Chuck Roberson as Cowboy
- Bob Terhune as Cowboy (as Robert Terhune)
- Jack Williams as Cowboy

== Reception ==
According to Fox records, the film needed to earn $2,100,000 in rentals to break even and made $1,675,000, meaning it made a loss.
