= David W. Guion =

American classical composer (1892–1981)

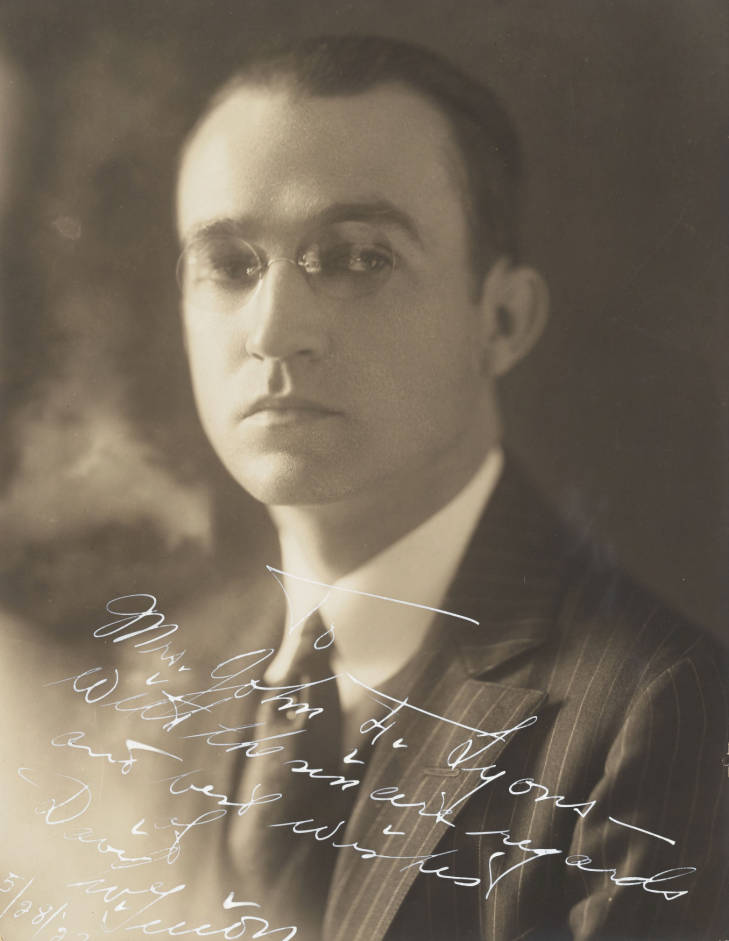
- Guion in 1922
- Born: December 15, 1892; Ballinger, Texas, U.S.
- Died: October 17, 1981 (aged 88); Dallas, Texas, U.S.
- Era: 20th century

David W. Guion (December 15, 1892 – October 17, 1981) was an American composer, best known for his arrangements of cowboy tunes, African American spirituals, and original compositions often inspired by the soundscape of west Texas.

== Early life and education ==
Guion (some sources show him as David Wendel Fentress Guion) was born in Ballinger, Texas, on December 15, 1892, to John I. and Armour Fentress Guion. Guion began to play the piano at an early age. He was intrigued by the cowboys, former cattle drivers, who worked on his father's ranch, and also by the spirituals that he heard whenever a family servant brought him to the services of an African-American church.

As a young boy, he was sent by train each Saturday to San Angelo, where he took piano lessons with Charles Finger, who later became a prolific author and literary magazine editor. In the fall of 1907, he studied at the Whipple Academy in Jacksonville, Illinois, after which he continued his studies in Fort Worth at Polytechnic College (now Texas Wesleyan University) under Wilbur MacDonald. After MacDonald's death in 1912, Guion went to Vienna, where he studied at the Imperial Academy of Music with Leopold Godowsky until the spring of 1914. Returning to Texas, Guion taught piano at Daniel Baker College (now Howard Payne University) in Brownwood, and also turned his attention to composition. One of his first major successes, a virtuosic arrangement of "Turkey in the Straw", was performed by many famous pianists, most notably Percy Grainger.

== From pianist to cowboy-composer ==
After Guion's father died in 1920, the family left Ballinger and moved to Dallas. Guion's father, John Isaac Guion II, was the son of a Mississippi governor (John I. Guion), and served as President of the Board of Directors at A&M College (now Texas A&M University), where Guion Hall was built in his honor. In the following decade, David Guion taught at Southern Methodist University, various private music schools in Dallas, Chicago Musical College, and in summer programs at Estes Park, Colorado. He won first prize in rodeos at Estes Park and Cheyenne, Wyoming. Guion was married briefly to Marion Ayers, daughter of the owner of a Dallas department store.

== Fame on Broadway and on the radio ==
In 1930 at the Roxy Theater in New York City, Guion starred in the cowboy show Prairie Echoes, featuring several of his cowboy songs, including his own version of "Home on the Range". It was Guion's arrangement that transformed "Home on the Range" from a little-known cowboy tune to one of the most famous and popular of all western songs, proclaimed by President Franklin D. Roosevelt as his own favorite. Guion did two series of weekly radio shows featuring his own music exclusively: Hearing America with Guion (June–September 1931) and David Guion and Orchestra (January–March 1932). These programs, which were carried across the country in a coast-to-coast hookup, contributed to the vogue for singing cowboys that continued on radio and television through the 1940s and early 1950s. Guion's ballet Shingandi, originally written for two pianos but later orchestrated by Ferde Grofé and introduced by Paul Whiteman's orchestra in November 1931 both in a live concert and in a nationwide radio broadcast, is one of the most significant American dramatic works in the style of primitivism. Concluding his two-year stay in New York, Guion returned to Dallas in the summer of 1932. Theodore Kosloff choreographed Shingandi and gave the work its first performance as a ballet in 1933.

== Later career ==
Guion's "My Cowboy Love-Song" was the theme for the show Cavalcade of Texas, which ran for six months as part of the Texas Centennial Exposition in 1936. His mother died later that year, after which Guion largely retired from public life, moving to an estate that he called "Home on the Range" along Pohopoco Creek in the Pocono Mountains in Pennsylvania, where he lived until 1965, when his property was condemned for a dam to be constructed along the creek to create Beltzville Lake.

The first week of February 1950 was declared David Guion Week and was celebrated with numerous performances across Texas. Climaxing this celebration was a ceremony at Howard Payne University in which Guion received an honorary doctorate. That same year he received a commission from the Houston Symphony Orchestra to write the fourteen-movement Texas Suite, which contains several newly composed pieces along with orchestrations of some of his previous works.

Returning from Pennsylvania to Dallas, Guion lived the rest of his life in the same house that had belonged to his mother.

== Death ==
He died in Dallas, on October 17, 1981, and was buried in his hometown of Ballinger.

== Compositions ==
Among the approximately 200 works by David Guion (some of which are arrangements of folk songs and African-American spirituals) are:

=== Piano works ===
- "The Arkansas Traveler"
- "The Harmonica-Player"
- "Minuet"
- "Sheep and Goat"
- "Turkey in the Straw"
- "Valse Arabesque"
- "The Texas Fox Trot" (1915)

=== Songs for voice and piano ===
- "All Day on the Prairie" (1930)
- "At the Cry of the First Bird"
- "The Bold Vaquero"
- "Embers"
- "Home on the Range"
- "How Dy Do, Mis' Springtime"
- "I Talked to God Last Night"
- "Mary Alone"
- "My Cowboy Love-Song"
- "Nobody Knows de Trouble I Sees"
- "De Ol' ark's a-Moverin'"
- "Only Through Thee, Lord"
- "Prayer"
- "Some o' These Days"
- "They've Taken My Lord Away" (1974)
- "The Crucifixion"
- Two Songs of the South: "Little Pickaninny Kid" "Greatest Miracle of All" (G. Schirmer copyright 1919)

=== Ballets ===
- Mother Goose
- Shingandi

=== Orchestral works ===
- Prairie Suite
- Texas Suite
