= Will James (artist) =

Canadian-American artist and writer (1892–1942)

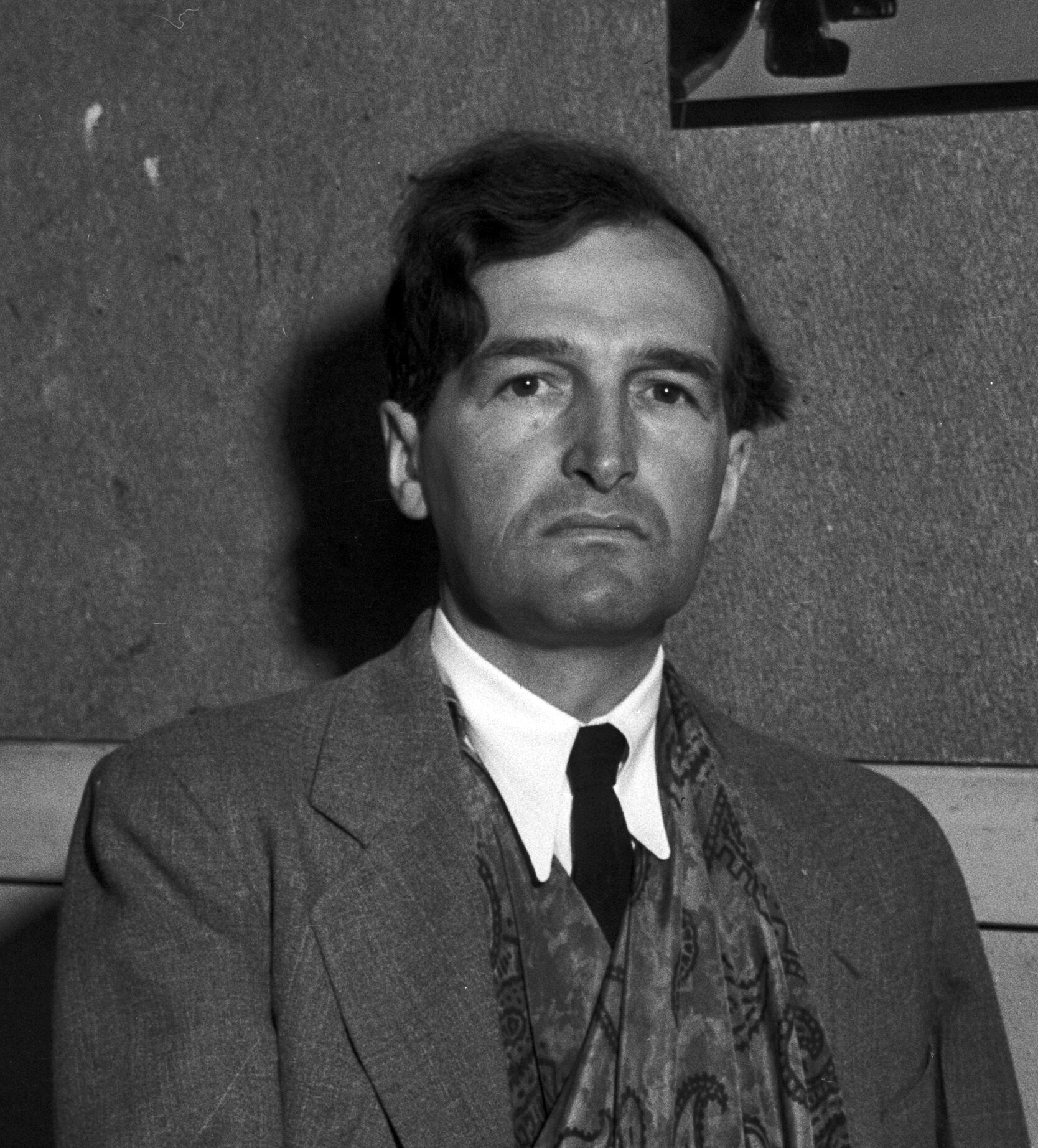
- James in 1933
- Born: Joseph Ernest Nephtali Dufault; June 6, 1892; Saint-Nazaire-d'Acton, Quebec, Canada
- Died: September 3, 1942 (aged 50); Hollywood, Los Angeles, California, U.S.
- Citizenship: American
- Occupations: Novelist; children's writer; artist
- Spouse: Alice Conradt
- Writing career
- Language: French, English
- Period: 1922–1942
- Genre: Western
- Notable works: Smoky the Cowhorse; Lone Cowboy: My Life Story
- Notable awards: Newbery Medal; 1927

William Roderick James (June 6, 1892 – September 3, 1942) was a Canadian-American artist and writer of the American West. He is known for writing Smoky the Cowhorse, for which he won the 1927 Newbery Medal, and numerous "cowboy" stories for adults and children. His artwork, which predominantly involved cowboy and rodeo scenes, followed "in the tradition of Charles Russell", and much of it was used to illustrate his books. In 1992, he was inducted into the Hall of Great Westerners of the National Cowboy & Western Heritage Museum.

== Early life ==
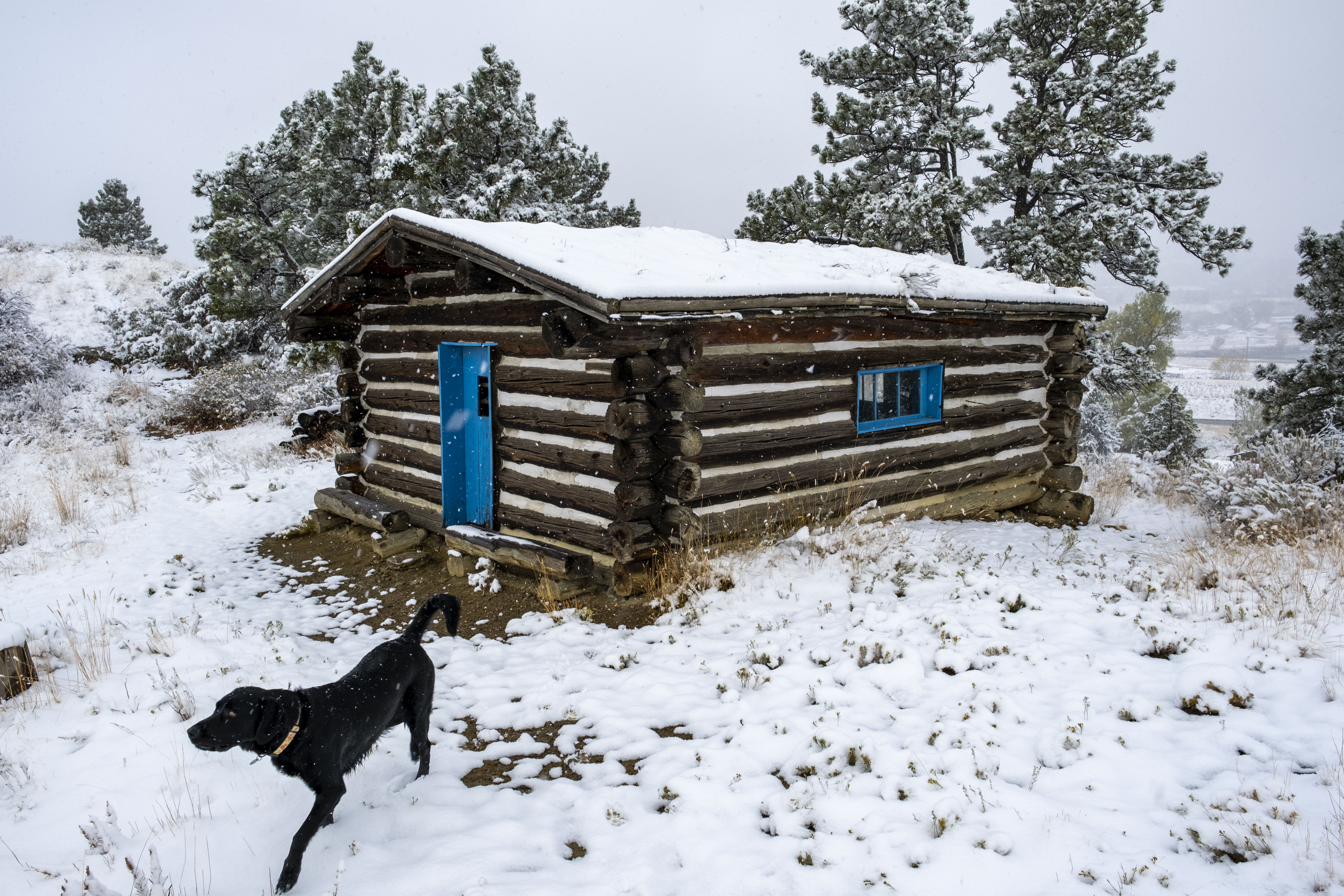
The "Will James Cabin" at Four Dances Natural Area near Billings, Montana.

James was born Joseph Ernest Nephtali Dufault, in 1892 in Saint-Nazaire-d'Acton, Quebec, Canada, although later, when he began mythologizing his life and in his autobiography, he claimed he was born in Montana. He accounted for his francophone accent by claiming that after his mother died when he was one (from influenza) and his father when he was four (having been gored by a steer), he was adopted by a fur trader ("old trapper Jean" Beaupré, whom he called "Bopy" since childhood) whose native language was French. Additionally, Beaupré was not fluent in English.

James settled near the new Franco-Saskatchewan settlement of Val Marie in 1910 and learned to be a western cowboy. He was taught wrangling by local cowboy Pierre Beaupre, and the two built separate homesteads along the Frenchman River in southwest Saskatchewan. James's property later became part of the Walt Larson ranch, which has been folded into the new Grasslands National Park.

James migrated to the United States, where he assumed the new name "William Roderick James". He came to Nevada from Montana in 1914. He was arrested there for cattle rustling and was sentenced to twelve to eighteen months in prison, which he served first in Ely, Nevada, and then at the Nevada State Penitentiary at Carson City. While in prison he concentrated on his drawing and produced pictures that the Ely Record commended with the recommendation that "with proper training he would soon be able to do first class work." At the state penitentiary he used his art in connection with his parole application, making a sketch entitled "A Turning Point", with the note: "Have had ample time for serious thought and it is my ambition to follow up on my art."

According to cowboy and folksinger Ian Tyson, James traveled to San Francisco to sell sketches and began working as a stuntman in western movies there. Soon he was in the U.S. Army, serving from 1918 to 1919. It was after his discharge that he began artwork in earnest. He returned to Nevada, arriving in Reno in July in time for the First Annual Nevada Round-Up in Reno, for which he illustrated the cover of the program and was paid $50. He also worked as a horse wrangler for the round-up.

In Reno, James soon teamed up with two men he knew before the war, Fred Conradt and Elmer Freel, to stage "broncobusting" exhibitions. During one of these events, James was thrown from a horse and sustained a severe concussion when he landed headfirst on a railroad track. He convalesced at the Conradt household.

== Art education and early career ==
James described his first interest in drawing as a pastime he took up (with stick in dirt or charcoal on the "rough boards of the bunk-house porch") to alleviate his boredom during the long stretches when his father was away working under a contract to break horses. His first extended period of concentrated drawing took place while he was in prison. While convalescing at the Conradt home he again took up drawing in earnest. It was there that he decided on a career in art. This decision was encouraged by Conradt's 15-year-old sister Alice.

In 1919 James decided to move to San Francisco to pursue an art career. He enrolled at the California School of Fine Arts in San Francisco where he took evening classes, while working as a theater ticket-taker by day. In San Francisco he met both Maynard Dixon and Harold Von Schmidt. The three occasionally rode horses together and spent time discussing art. At the end of the year, through Von Schmidt's connections, James was able to sell two series of sketches to Sunset, a West Coast periodical. They both formed a narrative and contained text written by James; they ran in the January and November issues.

James returned to Reno and married the 16-year-old Alice Conradt. The couple then travelled first to Kingman, Arizona, then to Santa Fe, New Mexico, near an artists' colony. Ranchers near the colony met James and introduced him to Burton Twitchell, dean of students at Yale University. As a result of the meeting, and with financial assistance by the same ranchers, James enrolled in Yale University the following fall. Alice soon followed but James was ill-suited for academics. The couple, with an introduction from Twitchell, travelled to New York City to sell his work. When Life Magazine declined his work, the couple returned to Reno. They soon moved to a cabin built by Alice's father in Washoe Valley. It was there that James first began writing for publication.

== Writing ==
In the fall of 1922 James began writing an article on horse bucking. It came to the attention of Max Perkins who believed the writing revealed "authentic American vernacular" and recommended the article for publication in Scribner's Magazine. Scribner's paid $300 for the work "Bucking Horses and Bucking-Horse Riders," together with its illustrations, James's first published story. Perkins asked James for more work, and over the years the Scribner's publishing house published twenty books of his over the following twenty years.

The sale of several short stories and books followed, enabling him and his wife to buy a small ranch in Washoe Valley, Nevada, where he wrote his most famous book, Smoky the Cowhorse. It was published in 1926 and won the Newbery Medal for children's literature in 1927. Several film adaptations were made of the book, with James narrating the 1933 film. His fictionalized autobiography, Lone Cowboy, was written in 1930 and was a bestselling Book-of-the-Month Club selection. He wrote his last book, The American Cowboy, in 1942, shortly before his death and the last line he wrote was "The cowboy will never die." In all, he wrote and illustrated 23 books, 5 of which were made into feature films.

His later years were spent on his ranch at Pryor Creek, Montana and at his Billings home on Smoky Lane. In the late 1930s he lived in the California high desert on the Godshall C Bar G Ranch. The ranch overlooked the Mojave River and is now within the boundaries of the town of Apple Valley, California. While on the ranch he wrote at least one book, Flint Spears. He died of alcoholism in Hollywood, California, in 1942.

The largest public collection of James' writings, artwork, and personal effects is preserved at the Yellowstone Art Museum in Billings, Montana.

In 1973, his story “The Boy and the Bronc Buster” was turned into a television movie. It aired on the The Wonderful World of Disney and starred Earl Holliman and Larry D. Mann.

In 1988, the Canadian National Film Board sponsored an 83-minute biography, Alias Will James, which commemorates the French Canadian's life and features his art and storycraft. Folk singer Ian Tyson wrote "The Man They Called Will James" for the score and it became a minor hit for Tyson.

James was inducted into the Nevada Writers Hall of Fame in 1991, and into the Hall of Great Westerners of the National Cowboy and Western Heritage Museum in 1992, on the hundredth anniversary of his birth.

== Select publications ==
- Cowboys North and South. New York: C. Scribner's. 1924. LCCN 24023378. (short stories, illustrated by the author)
- The Drifting Cowboy. New York: C. Scribner's Sons. 1925. LCCN 25021273. (short stories, illustrated by the author)
- Smoky the Cowhorse. New York: Scribner's. 1926. ISBN 9780684171456. LCCN 26016523. (Newberry Award-winning novel) (Describes the experiences of Smoky, the mouse-colored horse, from his birth on the range, his capture by humans, through his work in the rodeo and on the ranch, and his eventual old age.)
- Cow Country. New York: Scribner's. 1926. LCCN 27022183. (short stories, illustrated by the author)
- Sand. New York, London: C. Scribner's Sons. 1929. LCCN 29009921. (novel, illustrated by the author)
- Lone Cowboy. New York, London: C. Scribner's Sons. 1930. LCCN 30020657. (autobiography, illustrated by the author)
- Big-Enough. New York, London: C. Scribner's Sons. 1931. LCCN 31028123. (novel, illustrated by the author)
- Sun-Up: The Tales of the Cow Camps. New York, London: C. Scribner's Sons. 1931. LCCN 31026987. (reprints & 7 new short stories, illustrated by the author)
- Uncle Bill: A Tale of Two Kids and a Cowboy. New York, London: C. Scribner's Sons. 1932. (illustrated by the author)
- All in the Day's Riding. New York, London: C. Scribner's Sons. 1933. LCCN 33027058. (short stories, illustrated by the author)
- The Three Mustangers. New York, London: C. Scribner's Sons. 1933. LCCN 33030565. (novel, illustrated by the author)
- Home Ranch. New York, London: C. Scribner's Sons. 1933. LCCN 35027364. (illustrated by the author)
- Young Cowboy. New York, London: C. Scribner's Sons. 1936. LCCN 35027315. (arranged from Big Enough and Sun up, illustrated by the author)
- In the Saddle With Uncle Bill. New York: C. Scribner's Sons. 1935. LCCN 35004219. (illustrated by the author)
- Scorpion: A Good Bad Horse. New York: C. Scribner's Sons. 1936. LCCN 36023527. (illustrated by the author)
- Cowboy in the Making. New York, London: C. Scribner's Sons. 1937. (juvenile edition from first chapters of Lone Cowboy, illustrated by the author)
- Flint Spears, Cowboy Rodeo Contestant. New York: C. Scribner's Sons. 1938. LCCN 38032855. (illustrated with drawings by the author and photographs)
- Look-See With Uncle Bill. New York: C. Scribner's Sons. 1938. LCCN 38006762. (illustrated by the author)
- The Will James Cowboy Book. New York: Scribner. 1938. LCCN 38018107. (collection of juvenile stories, illustrated by the author)
- The Dark Horse. New York, London: C. Scribner's Sons. 1939. LCCN 39032121. (juvenile novel, illustrated by the author)
- Horses I've Known. New York: Scribner. 1940. LCCN 41001024. (juvenile, illustrated by the author)
- My First Horse. New York, London: C. Scribner's Sons. 1940. LCCN 40030566. (juvenile picture book, illustrated by the author)
- The American Cowboy. New York, London: C. Scribner's. 1942. LCCN 42007197. (historical novel, illustrated by the author)
- Will James Book of Cowboy Stories. New York: Scribner's. 1951. (posthumous collection of stories, illustrated by the author)

== Filmography ==
- Lone Cowboy (1933)
- Smoky (1933)
- Smoky (1946)
- Sand (1949)
- Smoky (1966)
- Shoot Out (1971)

== Family ==
James is an uncle to journalist Pierre Dufault and a grand uncle to singer Luce Dufault.

Awards
Preceded by Arthur Bowie Chrisman	Newbery Medal winner 1927	Succeeded by Dhan Gopal Mukerji
