= Charles Boardman Hawes =

American maritime writer (1989–1923)

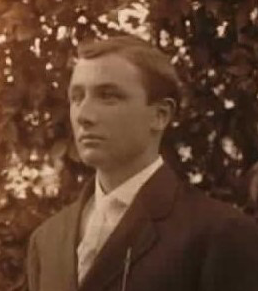
- Born: January 24, 1889; Clifton Springs, New York, U.S.
- Died: July 16, 1923 (aged 34); Springfield, Massachusetts
- Education: Bowdoin College
- Alma mater: Harvard
- Occupation: Writer
- Spouse: Dorothea Cable
- Relatives: Charles Taylor Hawes and Martha Tibbetts Boardman
- Writing career
- Genres: Fiction and nonfiction
- Subject: Sea stories
- Notable work: Three historical novels
- Notable awards: Newbery Medal

Charles Boardman Hawes (January 24, 1889 – July 16, 1923) was an American writer of fiction and nonfiction sea stories, best known for three historical novels. He died suddenly at age 34, after only two of his five books had been published. He was the first U.S.-born winner of the annual Newbery Medal, recognizing his third novel The Dark Frigate (1923) as the year's best American children's book. Reviewing the Hawes Memorial Prize Contest in 1925, The New York Times observed that "his adventure stories of the sea caused him to be compared with Stevenson, Dana and Melville".

== Life ==
Hawes was the elder son of Charles Taylor Hawes and Martha Tibbetts Boardman. Born in Clifton Springs, New York, he was raised in Bangor, Maine, and graduated from Bowdoin College in 1911 where he was "editor of The Quill and a devoted student of the classics". He was a graduate student at Harvard for one year, on the staff of The Youth's Companion to 1920, and associate editor of The Open Road to his death in 1923. On June 1, 1916, Hawes married Dorothea Cable of Northampton, Massachusetts, the youngest daughter of the novelist George Washington Cable and Louise Stewart Bartlett. At that time he lived in Cambridge and worked for The Youth's Companion.

Hawes' first book was an adventure novel published by Atlantic Monthly Press and Little, Brown and Company in 1920: The Mutineers: a tale of old days at sea and of adventures in the Far East as Benjamin Lathrop set it down some sixty years ago. His second book, The Great Quest: a romance of 1826 [...] was first runner-up for the inaugural Newbery Medal in 1922, the first American award for children's books. (Note: The Story of Mankind by Hendrik Willem van Loon and The Great Quest tallied 163 and 22 (or 77% and 10%) of the nominating votes by children's librarians, with 27 votes cast for thirteen other books. That was considered decisive without postal deliberation by the jury. Smith, pp. 40–42.)

Hawes died suddenly of pneumonic meningitis in Springfield, Massachusetts, on July 16, 1923, two days before the publication of Gloucester, by Land and Sea, a 226-page mainly historical book about his chosen home city of Gloucester, Massachusetts. He was survived by his wife and two sons.

He had recently delivered the completed manuscript of The Dark Frigate: wherein is told the story of Philip Marsham [...], a 17th-century adventure set in England and Barbados as well as at sea. It was published by Atlantic in October and was a Boston Globe fiction best-seller that fall. The children's librarians voted him "author of the most distinguished contribution to American literature for children", winner of the third annual Newbery Medal and the first for a writer born in the U.S. (Note: Van Loon and Hugh Lofting were immigrants from the Netherlands and England. After 1924 (Hawes), the nominating votes by children's librarians were formally relegated to mere nominations; the committee would deliberate regardless of the tally, in order to secure the high standard. The 1924 tally is unknown and no runner-up was named. Smith, pp. 40–42, 51–53, 124.)

Hawes dedicated The Dark Frigate to his father-in-law G. W. Cable and his widow received the Newbery Medal at the American Library Association conference next summer. The Atlanta Constitution remarked, "Mr. Hawes' great gift was the ability to write sea stories ... His literary skill in capturing the style and atmosphere of the eighteenth century gained him many adult admirers ... The loss of Mr. Hawes is irreparable. But it is to be hoped that this posthumous recognition may stimulate others to perpetuate the standard he has created." In 1962 The Dark Frigate was named to the Lewis Carroll Shelf Award list. (Note: Regarding the first 40 or so Newbery Medal winners, Irene Smith listed The Dark Frigate among twelve that children's librarians considered "lowest in popularity". In partial explanation she observed that five of those including The Dark Frigate were "more or less historic and distant in setting". Smith, p. 89.)

Two articles by Hawes were posthumously published in The Atlantic Monthly. His wife completed one more book, Whaling, published in 1924. One review of the 358-page history highlighted the remark by Hawes, "Time has given the business a glamour that would astound the luckless victims of its reality".

== Hawes Memorial Prize Contest ==
In September 1923, Atlantic Monthly Press opened a contest with $2000 prize, plus royalties, for "an adventure story of not less than 60,000 words, of the characters and excellence of the works of the late Charles Boardman Hawes" (quoting a newspaper) The winner was a novel by Clifford MacClellan Sublette, The Scarlet Cockerel (March 1925). His research before writing concerned "the French–Spanish difficulties in Florida". Sublette was "an agricultural field worker in the summer" who had toured the American West and written adventure short stories. The Press was so pleased with the submissions that it published two runners-up as well as the prize winner simultaneously. A joint review in The New York Times called them the Hawes Memorial Prize Contest books.

== Works ==
- The Mutineers: a tale of old days at sea and of adventures in the Far East as Benjamin Lathrop set it down some sixty years ago (Atlantic Monthly Press, 1920), illustrated by George Edmund Varian (Note: Library of Congress catalog) (Little, Brown, 1919 or 1920) (Note: various)
- The Great Quest; a romance of 1826, wherein are recorded the experiences of Josiah Woods of Topham, and of those others with whom he sailed for Cuba and the Gulf of Guinea (Atlantic Monthly Press, 1921) (Note: Library of Congress and Brown University catalogs) (Little, Brown, 1921) (Note: various)
- Gloucester, by Land and Sea; the story of a New England seacoast town (Little, Brown, July 1923), illustrated by Lester G. Hornby — published two days after his death
- The Dark Frigate; wherein is told the story of Philip Marsham who lived in the time of King Charles and was bred a sailor but came home to England after many hazards by sea and land and fought for the King at Newbury and lost a great inheritance and departed for Barbados in the same ship, by curious chance, in which he had long before adventured with the pirates (Atlantic Monthly Press, October 1923) (Note: Library of Congress and Brown University catalogs) (Little, Brown, 1923) (Note: various)
- "The Story of the Ship "Globe" of Nantucket", The Atlantic Monthly (December 1923): 769–79
- "A Boy Who Went Whaling", The Atlantic Monthly 133:6 (June 1924): 797–805
- Whaling (Doubleday, Page, 1924) — "Completed after the author's death by his wife."

== Notes ==
Awards
Preceded by Hugh Lofting	Newbery Medal winner 1924	Succeeded by Charles Finger
