= Shen of the Sea =

1925 collection of short stories by Arthur Bowie Chrisman

- First edition
- Author: Arthur Bowie Chrisman
- Illustrator: Else Hasselriis
- Genre: Children's short story collection
- Publisher: E. P. Dutton
- Publication date: 1925
- Publication place: United States
- Media type: Print
- Pages: 252
- OCLC: 299415
- LC Class: PZ7.C45 Sh

Shen of the Sea is a collection of short stories written by Arthur Bowie Chrisman. It was first published by Dutton in 1925, illustrated with more than 50 silhouettes by Else Hasselriis. Chrisman won the 1926 Newbery Medal for the work, recognizing the previous year's "most distinguished contribution to American literature for children".

The original title page shows subtitle A Book for Children and one early dustjacket shows Chinese Stories for Children. Both subtitles have been used for later editions.

Chrisman's 16 original stories are written in the style of humorous Chinese folk tales. The title story tells of a king who tries to match wits with the demons of the water in order to save his city from a flood. Other tales relate the origin of chopsticks, and an instance when mud pies are revealed to be the origin of fine China.

== Stories ==
- Ah Mee's Invention - about the invention of the printing press
- Shen of the Sea - a story about tricking demons to save a kingdom
- How Wise Were the Old Men - a story about prophecy and the twists life take
- Chop-Sticks - about the invention of chop sticks
- Buy a Father - a story about morality, primarily obedience
- Four Generals - a story about using cleverness to overcome
- The Rain King's Daughter - a story about a young woman who uses cleverness to avoid a war
- Many Wives - a story about a beautiful young maiden and a not so bright king
- That Lazy Ah Fun - about the invention of gunpowder
- The Moon Maiden - a love story
- Ah Tcha the Sleeper - a story about tea
- I Wish It Would Rain - a story about an over indulged queen
- High as Han Hsin - about the invention of the kite
- Contrary Chueh Chun - a funny story about a man who always does or believes the opposite
- Pies of the Princess - the invention of fine china
- As Hai Low Kept House - a funny story about following orders literally and a series of unfortunate circumstances

Awards
Preceded by Tales from Silver Lands	Newbery Medal recipient 1926	Succeeded by Smoky the Cowhorse
