= A Year of Prophesying =

1924 book by H. G. Wells

- First edition cover
- Author: H. G. Wells
- Language: English language
- Genre: Column (periodical)
- Publisher: T. Fisher Unwin
- Publication date: 1924
- Publication place: United Kingdom
- Media type: Print (Hardback)
- Pages: 352

A Year of Prophesying collects 55 newspaper columns written by H. G. Wells in 1923 and 1924.

After the extraordinary success of The Outline of History, Wells was in great demand for commentary on current events. He wrote regular columns first for The Westminster Gazette and later for The New York Times and the Daily Express. The articles in A Year of Prophesying were written for the McClure Syndicate.

== Pointed predictions ==
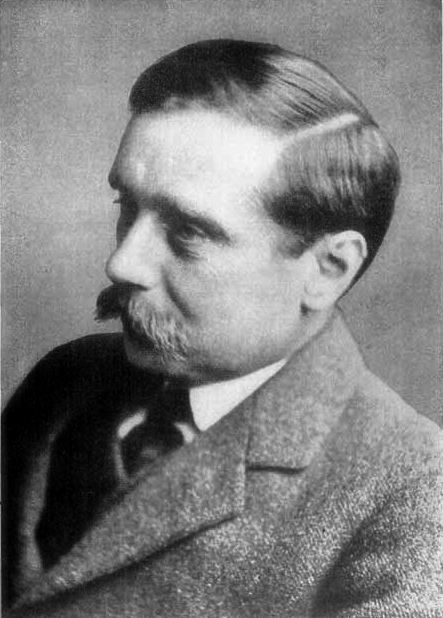
H.G Wells

Wells's most recent biographer has observed that "Considering their topical origin, the views they take have worn surprisingly well. Wells predicts an eventual war between the United States and Japan; he is disappointed by Labour's brief stint in power; he attacks the gold standard, Italian Fascism, the French occupation of the Ruhr and the lenient sentence handed out to Hitler after the Munich putsch; he advocates compulsory schooling to at least the age of sixteen, nursery provision for four-year-olds and global conservation policies to protect whales, gorillas and elephants."

== On Communism ==
On the future of Communism, Wells wrote on Aug. 9, 1924, that "there will probably be a big movement toward Communism in the industrial centres of India and China and Japan. But in Europe I think that the Communist drive has passed its maximum and that the popular mind is moving onward to a more constructive and hopeful type of Socialism. Just as art in a phase of extreme sterility escaped by going back behind Raphael and starting afresh from the Pre-Raphaelite phase, so I think Socialism will soon be getting behind the unfortunate misdirection of Marx and Engels to become once more Utopian and fruitful."
