= Christina Alberta's Father =

1925 novel by H. G. Wells

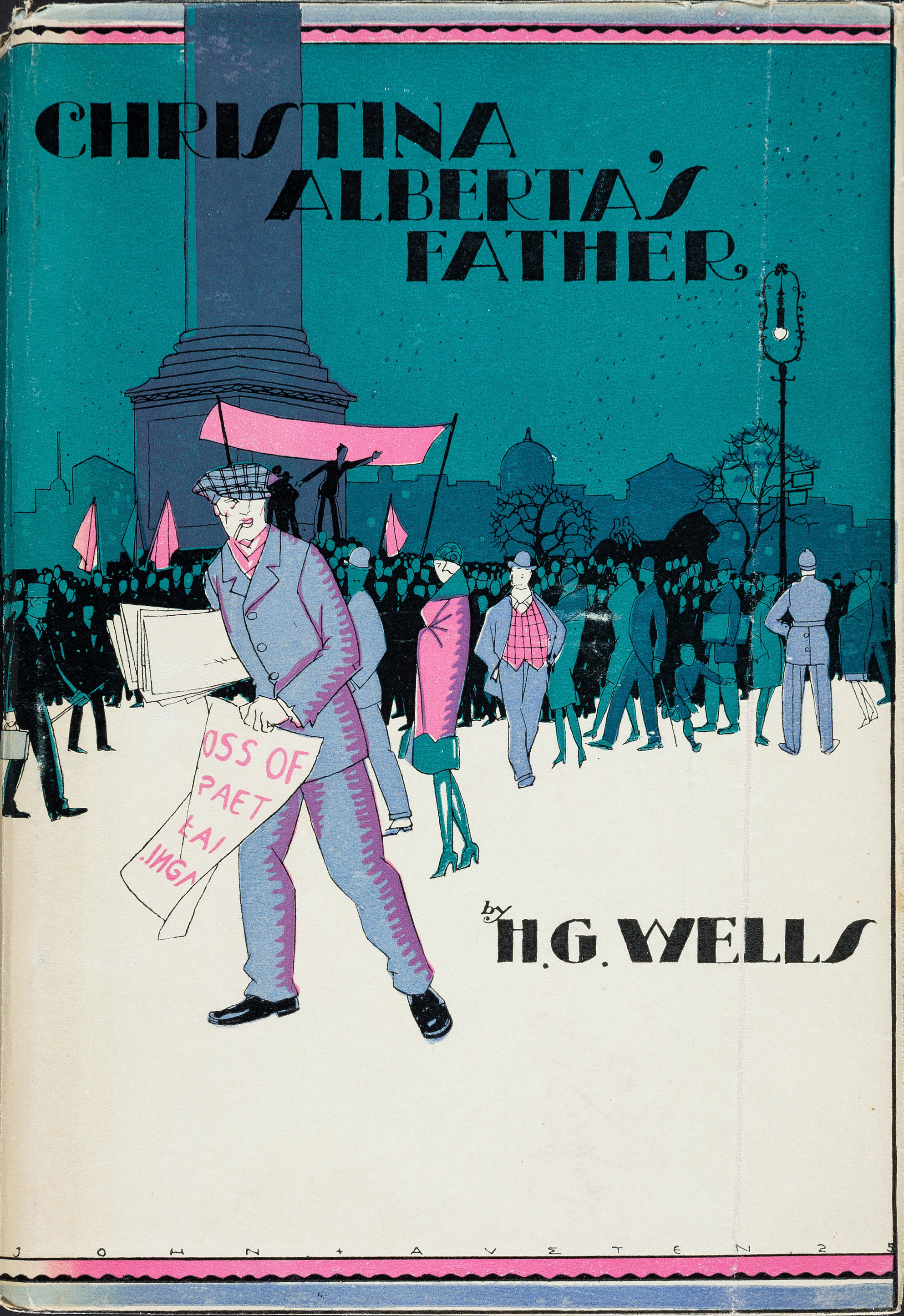
- First UK edition
- Author: H. G. Wells
- Language: English
- Publisher: Jonathan Cape (UK); Macmillan (US)
- Publication date: 1925
- Publication place: United Kingdom
- Media type: Print (hardback)
- Pages: 401 pp

Christina Alberta's Father (1925) is a novel by English writer H. G. Wells set in London and environs in 1920–1922 with two protagonists: Albert Edward Preemby and his daughter, Christina Alberta.

Starting off as a seemingly light-hearted novel of social realism, highlighting the class system of contemporary society, much like he did in Kipps, Wells soon lambasts the then-current state of mental health legislation and of lunatic asylums, before ending the novel with the characters discussing feminism and the conflict between individual independence and being a willing part of a greater society. With the title character of the father dying of pneumonia after rescue from a mental hospital, and his daughter Christina Alberta refusing to marry her love interest Bobby Roothers (after candidly admitting to him that she is no longer a virgin), the expected happy ending does not occur. Perhaps due to its descent into open didacticism, the novel was not one of Wells' most successful or popular.

== Characters ==
Mr. Preemby is a dreamy, unassertive man until he is persuaded, in the months following his wife's death, that he is the reincarnation of Sargon, the ancient king of Sumeria, returned to restore harmony in a disordered post-World War I world. He has long been attracted to esoterica and stories of ancient Atlantis, and is persuaded that he has a special destiny by a séance at a boarding house in Royal Tunbridge Wells. Committed to a lunatic asylum, Mr. Preemby escapes and recovers some of his sanity, but dies prematurely in the winter of 1921–1922.

Chris Hossett, his wife, before her demise runs the Limpid Stream Laundry with Mr. Preemby's assistance. Her only daughter, Christina Alberta, is not Mr. Preemby's natural daughter, being the fruit of a brief liaison in the summer of 1899 in the seaside resort of Sheringham. Christina is a strong personality determined to live independently. She later discovers, to their mutual surprise, her true father, Wilfred Devizes, a psychologist, during her search for Mr. Preemby. Devizes serves as a mouthpiece for many of H.G. Wells's social ideas in the latter half of the novel, such as the notion that "True education [is] self-subordination to a greater life, to the social self."

Christina Alberta's Father also features two other important characters: Paul Lambone, a successful writer who befriends Christina Alberta and is mostly treated in a comic vein, and Robert "Bobby" Roothing, an aspiring writer. Bobby finds "Sargon" appealing, in part because he is a veteran of military service in Mesopotamia during the First World War, and helps Mr. Preemby find a room during his "Sargon" phase, counseling him and then rescuing him from the asylum at Cummerdown Hill by taking him to lodgings in Dymchurch. Bobby falls in love with Christina Alberta, who reciprocates but refuses to marry him in order to maintain her independence.

Speaking in Vienna in 1928 the psychologist C.G.Jung stated, "My friend the great English writer H.G.Wells has drawn a wonderful picture of this state of affairs in a novel. The hero of his story 'Christina Alberta's Father' is a petty businessman, completely imprisoned in his prosaic surroundings and his business. But in his few leisure hours another ego gradually emerges from his subconscious. He fancies he is the re-embodiment of the Babylonian ruler Sargon I, the reincarnation of king of kings. Some kind of Sargon, in various disguises, is hiding in everyone of us. The fact that he cannot get out of the subconscious and is unable to develop himself is often the case of severe psychic disturbances."

== Self-reference ==
In Part 3, chapter 3, section 3, Wells references himself and his utopian science fiction: "Christina Alberta's thoughts and speech seemed to him to be moving about without a stitch on, like the people in some horrible Utopia by Wells."
