= The Great Quest =

Book by Charles Hawes

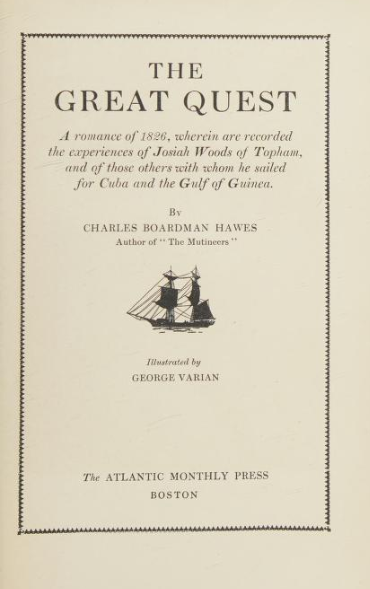
- Title page The Great Quest (1921)
- Author: Charles Boardman Hawes
- Illustrator: George Varian
- Language: English
- Genre: Adventure
- Publisher: Little, Brown and Company
- Publication date: December 1921
- Publication place: United States
- Pages: 359

The Great Quest (Full title: The Great Quest: A romance of 1826, wherein are recorded the experiences of Josiah Woods of Topham, and of those others with whom he sailed for Cuba and the Gulf of Guinea) by Charles Boardman Hawes is a children's adventure novel which was a Newbery Honor recipient in 1922. Illustrated by George Varian, it was published by The Atlantic Monthly Press in 1921.

== Plot ==
The story opens in fictional Topham, Massachusetts, in 1826. After the man Cornelius "Neal" Gleazen unexpectedly returns to town, he involves childhood friend Seth Woods and Seth's nephew, twenty-year-old protagonist Josiah "Joe" Woods, in a dangerous sea journey to retrieve a hidden treasure. Accompanying them are Seth's two store clerks, Arnold Lamont and Sim Muzzy, and farmer Abraham Guptil, on whose mortgage Neal forced Seth to foreclose to raise money to outfit the expedition.

When the travelers reach Cuba it is revealed that there is no hidden treasure, and that Neal's actual intent is to kidnap native Africans from Guinea to sell as slaves. However, it is not until they reach Africa that Joe, Seth, and the others find an opportunity to take control of the expedition from Neal. While in Africa, they rescue from danger a white missionary's daughter, who is accompanied by a native African slave or servant (his status is unclear) belonging to the Fantee nation. Both of these accompany them back to Massachusetts via South America. Arnold Lamont, however, stays behind in Valparaiso.

== Awards ==
The Great Quest received a special runner-up citation from the Newbery committee in 1922, the first year the Newbery was awarded. According to Barbara Elleman in The Newbery and Caldecott Awards, originally the award was based on votes by a selected jury of Children's Librarian Section officers. Hendrik van Loon's book The Story of Mankind won the award with 163 votes out of the 212 cast. The Great Quest came in second with twenty-two votes. All previous runner-up citations were converted to Honor Awards in 1971.
