= Arthur Bowie Chrisman =

American writer

- Born: July 16, 1889; Clarke County, Virginia
- Died: February 14, 1953 (aged 63); Shirley, Arkansas
- Occupation: Writer (novelist)
- Writing career
- Period: 20th century
- Genre: Juvenile fiction

Arthur Bowie Chrisman (July 16, 1889 – February 14, 1953) was an American author. He was born in Clarke County, Virginia. Chrisman was educated in a one-room school and attended Virginia Polytechnic Institute from 1906 to 1908 but left at the end of his sophomore year. His collection of sixteen short stories, Shen of the Sea: A Book for Children (1925), received the Newbery Medal in 1926. Chrisman's other works included The Wind That Wouldn't Blow: Stories of the Merry Middle Kingdom for Children, and Myself (1927), Clarke County, 1836–1936 (1936), and Treasures Long Hidden: Old Tales and New Tales of the East (1941).

Chrisman suffered from respiratory problems and moved to Arkansas in about 1943. In his later years he became reclusive and seldom left his one-room cabin in Shirley, Arkansas. Two local men discovered his body on February 21, 1953, after Chrisman missed one of his regular grocery-buying trips into Clinton. The Van Buren County coroner estimated that he had been dead for about a week.

Awards
Preceded by Charles Finger	Newbery Medal winner 1926	Succeeded by Will James
