= Smoky (1933 film) =

1933 film by Eugene Forde

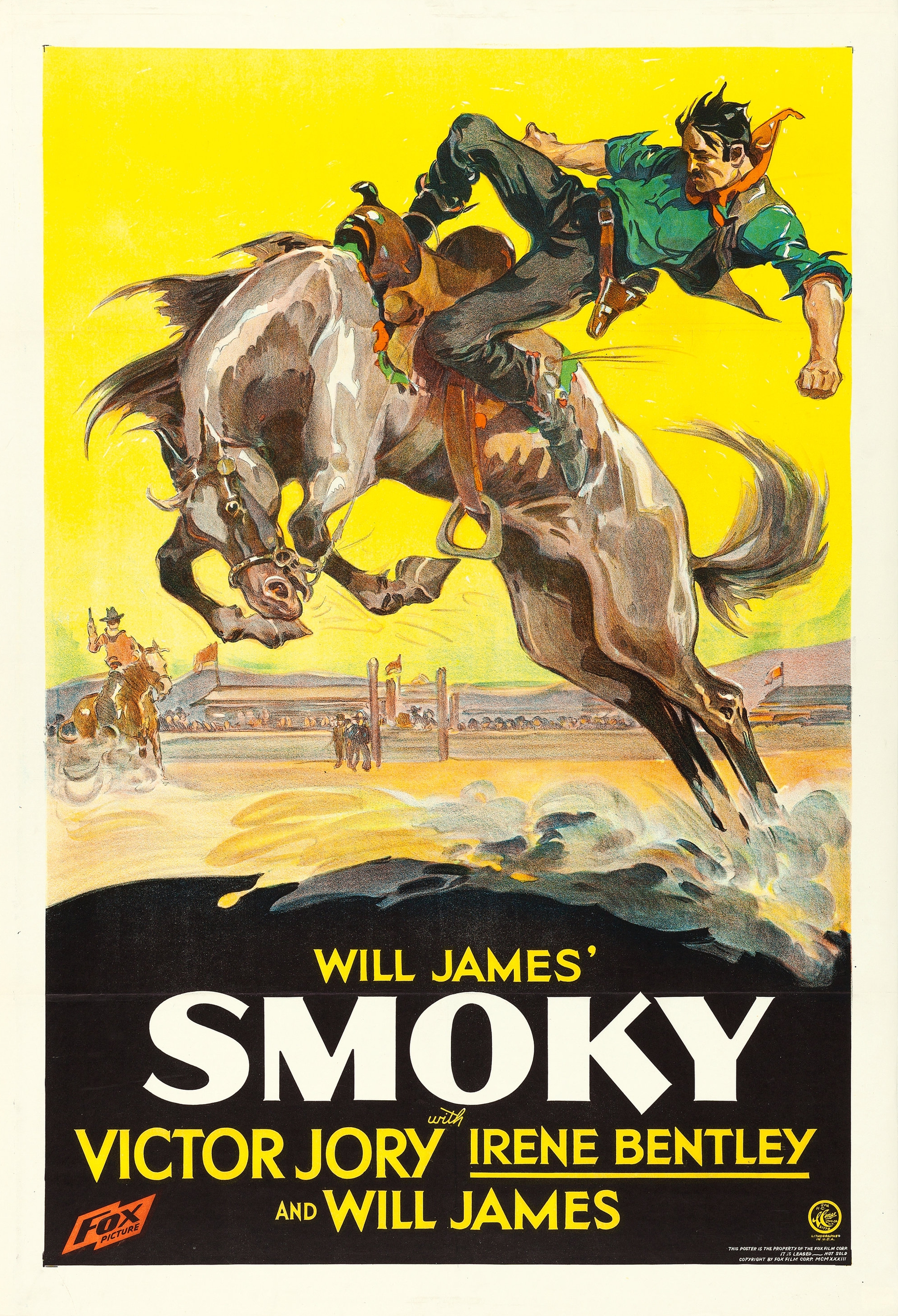
- Theatrical release poster
- Directed by: Eugene Forde
- Screenplay by: Stuart Anthony; Paul Perez
- Based on: Smoky the Cowhorse by Will James
- Starring: Victor Jory; Irene Bentley; Frank Campeau; Hank Mann; LeRoy Mason
- Narrated by: Will James
- Cinematography: Daniel B. Clark
- Music by: David Buttolph
- Production company: Fox Film Corporation
- Distributed by: Fox Film Corporation
- Release date: December 8, 1933
- Running time: 69 minutes
- Country: United States
- Language: English

Smoky is a 1933 American pre-Code Western film directed by Eugene Forde and written by Stuart Anthony and Paul Perez. The film stars Victor Jory, Irene Bentley, Frank Campeau, Hank Mann, and LeRoy Mason. It is the first of three film adaptations of the 1926 novel Smoky the Cowhorse by Will James, who serves as narrator..

The film was released on December 8, 1933, by Fox Film Corporation. It had an original copyright notice in 1933 that was renewed in 1961. Under the terms of Title 17 of the U.S. Code, the film will enter the public domain in 2029.

== Cast ==
- Victor Jory as Clint Peters
- Irene Bentley as Betty Jarvis
- Frank Campeau as 'Scrubby'
- Hank Mann as Buck
- LeRoy Mason as Lefty
