= Albertine disparue =

Sixth volume of In search of lost time

Albertine Gone
- First editions
- Author: Marcel Proust
- Original title: Albertine disparue
- Language: French
- Series: In Search of Lost Time
- Publication date: 1925
- Publication place: France

Albertine disparue (Albertine Gone) is the title of the sixth volume of Marcel Proust's seven part novel, À la recherche du temps perdu. It is also known as La Fugitive (in French) and The Sweet Cheat Gone (in English).

== Plot ==
In the sixth volume of the series, the Narrator's past actions meet an equivalent resolution. The captive is now the fugitive. As in previous volumes, envy and distrust eventually reveal unsuspected and unwanted revelations, such as Albertine's homosexuality, which lead the Narrator to reconcile himself with his melancholy. Unfortunately, happiness still eludes him, and the marriages of his former friends pit him against his own misery, which he tries to cover with indifference.

== Publication ==
The final three volumes of the novel were published posthumously and without Proust's final corrections and revisions. The first edition, based on Proust's manuscript, was published as Albertine disparue to prevent it from being confused with Rabindranath Tagore's La Fugitive (1921). The first definitive edition of the novel in French (1954), also based on Proust's manuscript, used the title La Fugitive. The second, even-more-definitive French edition (1987–89) uses the title Albertine disparue and is based on an unmarked typescript acquired in 1962 by the Bibliothèque Nationale.

== Mante-Proust typescript ==
After the death in 1986 of Proust's niece, Suzy Mante-Proust, her son-in-law discovered among her papers a typescript that had been corrected and annotated by Proust. The late changes Proust made include a small crucial detail and the deletion of approximately 150 pages. This version was published in French (Paris: Grasset, 1987) and translated as Albertine Gone by Terence Kilmartin (London: Chatto & Windus, 1989); the translation is now out of print.

Whether Proust's changes to the manuscript can be integrated into the text of modern editions of Lost Time, remains the subject of contentious debate. Current French editions adopt different approaches to the problem. The 1989 French Pléiade edition preserved the deleted material. However, Jean Milly's 2002 GF Flammarion edition follows Proust's typescript, and restores the sub-title "Sodom and Gomorrah III."

This disagreement reflects the dilemma created by the condition of Albertine disparue/La Fugitive. Proust's edited typescript shows his final intentions, but he did not have time to fully realize those intentions. Thus, the typescript leaves Albertine disparue inconsistent with Time Regained. Moreover, Proust's anticipated (but never realized) further volumes of Sodom and Gomorrah might ultimately have included the deleted material.

For the 2002 English translation of the volume, editor Christopher Prendergast charged Peter Collier with translating the 1989 Pléiade edition.
