= 1972 in literature =

This article contains information about the literary events and publications of 1972.

== Events ==
- May 22 – Cecil Day-Lewis, Poet Laureate of the United Kingdom, dies at Lemmons, the home of novelists Kingsley Amis and Elizabeth Jane Howard in North London, which he has shared with his wife and son – actors Jill Balcon and Daniel Day-Lewis – and at weekends with Kingsley's writer son Martin Amis and others.
- June 4 – The poet Joseph Brodsky is expelled from the Soviet Union.
- October – In Somalia, the government of President Siad Barre formally introduces the Somali Latin alphabet as the country's official writing script.
- October 6–7 – The new Staatstheater Darmstadt is opened.
- October 8 – The play Sizwe Bansi is Dead has its first performance at the Space Theatre (Cape Town), South Africa, before a multiracial audience. Playwright Athol Fugard directs, with co-writers John Kani and Winston Ntshona in lead roles.
- October 10 – Sir John Betjeman is declared Poet Laureate of the United Kingdom, the first knight ever to be so.
- "The three Marias", Maria Isabel Barreno, Maria Teresa Horta and Maria Velho da Costa, publish in Lisbon New Portuguese Letters (Novas Cartas Portuguesas), a collection challenging the Estado Novo dictatorship, to immediate success, but banned by censors as "pornographic and an offense to public morals". Its authors are imprisoned for "abuse of freedom of the press" and "outrage to public decency". Only after the 1974 "Carnation Revolution" does their trial end with the authors pardoned and the judge assigning "outstanding literary merit" to the book.

== New books ==
=== Fiction ===
- Dritëro Agolli – The Rise and Fall of Comrade Zylo (Shkëlqimi dhe Rënja e Shokut Zylo, published in the magazine Hosteni)
- Srikrishna Alanahalli – Kaadu
- Jorge Amado – Teresa Batista Cansada da Guerra (Tereza Batista: Home from the Wars)
- Eric Ambler – The Levanter
- Martin Amis – The Rachel Papers
- William Charles Anderson – Hurricane Hunters
- Evelyn Anthony – The Poellenberg Inheritance
- Isaac Asimov – The Gods Themselves
- Nina Bawden – Anna Apparent
- Pierre Boulle – Ears of the Jungle (Les Oreilles de jungle)
- Melvyn Bragg – Josh Lawton
- John Braine – The Queen of a Distant Country
- Gerald Butler – There Is a Death, Elizabeth
- Martin Caidin – Cyborg
- Taylor Caldwell – Captains and the Kings
- Italo Calvino – Invisible Cities (Le città invisibili)
- John Dickson Carr – The Hungry Goblin: A Victorian Detective Novel
- Angela Carter – The Infernal Desire Machines of Doctor Hoffman
- Agatha Christie – Elephants Can Remember
- Brian Cleeve – Tread Softly in this Place
- Robin Cook – Year of the Intern
- Michael Crichton – The Terminal Man
- Robertson Davies – The Manticore
- Margaret Thomson Davis – The Breadmakers
- L. Sprague de Camp and Catherine Crook de Camp, editors – 3000 Years of Fantasy and Science Fiction
- R. F. Delderfield – To Serve Them All My Days
- Margaret Drabble, B. S. Johnson and others – London Consequences
- Anne Edwards – Haunted Summer
- Howard Fast – The Hessian
- Frederick Forsyth – The Odessa File
- Brian Garfield – Death Wish
- Joe Gores – Dead Skip
- Günter Grass – Aus dem Tagebuch einer Schnecke (From the Diary of a Snail)
- Graham Greene – The Honorary Consul
- Peter Handke – A Sorrow Beyond Dreams (Wunschloses Unglück)
- James Herriot – All Creatures Great and Small
- Georgette Heyer – Lady of Quality
- George V. Higgins – The Friends of Eddie Coyle
- Isabelle Holland – The Man Without a Face
- Witi Ihimaera – Pounamu Pounamu (short story collection)
- Carl Jacobi – Disclosures in Scarlet
- John Jakes – Conquest of the Planet of the Apes (film novelization)
- P. D. James – An Unsuitable Job for a Woman
- Dan Jenkins – Semi-Tough
- Thomas Keneally – The Chant of Jimmie Blacksmith
- Dean Koontz
  - Chase (written as K. R. Dwyer)
  - Children of the Storm (written as Deanna Dwyer)
  - Dance with the Devil (written as Deanna Dwyer)
  - The Dark of Summer (written as Deanna Dwyer)
  - A Darkness in My Soul
  - The Flesh in the Furnace
  - Starblood
  - Time Thieves
  - Warlock
- Derek Lambert
  - Blackstone
  - The Red House
- Halldór Laxness – Guðsgjafaþula (Mantra of God's Gift)
- Fritz Leiber – You're All Alone
- Elmore Leonard – Forty Lashes Less One
- Ira Levin – The Stepford Wives
- Audrey Erskine Lindop – Journey Into Stone
- Frank Belknap Long – The Rim of the Unknown
- Peter Lovesey – Abracadaver
- Robert Ludlum – The Osterman Weekend
- John D. MacDonald – The Scarlet Ruse
- Ngaio Marsh – Tied Up in Tinsel
- Barry N. Malzberg – Beyond Apollo
- David McCullough – The Great Bridge
- Larry McMurtry – All My Friends Are Going to Be Strangers
- David Morrell – First Blood
- Vladimir Nabokov – Transparent Things
- Kenzaburō Ōe (大江 健三郎) – The Day He Himself Shall Wipe My Tears Away (みずから我が涙をぬぐいたまう日, Mizukara Waga Namida o Nugui Tamau Hi)
- Donald G. Payne (written as Ian Cameron) – The Mountains at the Bottom of the World
- Chaim Potok – My Name Is Asher Lev
- Thomas N. Scortia – Artery of Fire
- Margery Sharp – The Innocents
- Isaac Bashevis Singer – Enemies, A Love Story
- Josef Škvorecký – The Miracle Game (Mirákl)
- Richard Martin Stern – Stanfield Harvest
- David Storey – Pasmore
- Arkady and Boris Strugatsky – Roadside Picnic («Пикник на обочине», Piknik na obochine)
- Paul Theroux – Saint Jack
- Hunter S. Thompson – Fear and Loathing in Las Vegas
- Irving Wallace – The Word
- Donald E. Westlake
  - Bank Shot
  - Cops and Robbers
  - Don't Lie to Me (written as Tucker Coe)
  - Plunder Squad (written as Richard Stark)

=== Children and young people ===
- Chinua Achebe – How the Leopard Got His Claws
- Richard Adams – Watership Down
- Lloyd Alexander – The Four Donkeys
- E. M. Almedingen – Anna
- Rev. W. Awdry – Tramway Engines (twenty-sixth in The Railway Series of 42 books by him and his son Christopher Awdry)
- Betty Baker
  - The Big Push (illustrated by Bonnie Johnson)
  - A Stranger and Afraid
- Judy Blume – Otherwise Known as Sheila the Great
- Michael Bond – Paddington's Garden (tenth in the Paddington Bear series)
- Ray Bradbury (illustrated by Joe Mugnaini) – The Halloween Tree
- Betsy Byars – The House of Wings
- Ellen Conford – Why Can't I Be William?
- Roald Dahl – Charlie and the Great Glass Elevator
- Rumer Godden
  - The Diddakoi (also Gypsy Girl)
  - The Old Woman Who Lived in a Vinegar Bottle
- Marguerite Henry (illustrated by Robert Lougheed) – San Domingo, the Medicine Hat Stallion
- Russell Hoban (illustrated by Abrom Hoban) – The Sea-thing Child
- Robert E. Howard (with Alicia Austin) – Echoes from an Iron Harp
- Tove Jansson – The Summer Book
- Alexander Key – The Strange White Doves
- Michael de Larrabeiti – The Redwater Raid
- Arnold Lobel – Frog and Toad Together (second in the Frog and Toad series of four books)
- Ronald McCuaig – Gangles
- James Marshall – George and Martha (first in a series of seven eponymous books)
- Helen Nicoll (illustrated by Jan Pieńkowski) – Meg and Mog (first in series)
- Graham Oakley – The Church Mouse (first in the Church Mice series of twelve books)
- Bill Peet
  - The Ant and the Elephant
  - Countdown to Christmas
- John Peterson (illustrated by Roberta Carter Clark) – The Littles Give a Party (fifth in The Littles series)
- Ellen Raskin – Franklin Stein
- Mary Renault – The Persian Boy
- Barbara Robinson – The Best Christmas Pageant Ever
- Joan G. Robinson (illustrated by Shirley Hughes) – The House in the Square
- Thomas Rockwell (illustrated by Gail Rockwell) – Squawwwk!
- Mary Rodgers – Freaky Friday
- Dr. Seuss – Marvin K. Mooney Will You Please Go Now!
- Marjorie W. Sharmat – Nate the Great
- Margery Sharp – Miss Bianca and the Bridesmaid (seventh in The Rescuers series of nine books)
- Alfred Slote – The Biggest Victory
- Robert Kimmel Smith – Chocolate Fever
- Eve Titus – Why the Wind God Wept
- P. L. Travers – Friend Monkey
- Judith Viorst – Alexander and the Terrible, Horrible, No Good, Very Bad Day

=== Drama ===
- Alan Ayckbourn – Absurd Person Singular
- Samuel Beckett – Not I
- Bill Bryden – Willie Rough
- Caryl Churchill – Owners
- Hanay Geiogamah – Body Indian
- Eugène Ionesco – Macbett
- Vijay Tendulkar
  - Ghashiram Kotwal
  - Sakharam Binder

=== Non-fiction ===
- The American Museum of Natural History – An Introduction
- Jacob Bronowski – The Ascent of Man
- L. Sprague de Camp
  - Great Cities of the Ancient World
  - with Catherine Crook de Camp – Darwin and His Great Discovery'
- Carlos Castaneda – Journey to Ixtlan: The Lessons of Don Juan
- Winston Graham – The Spanish Armadas
- Bruce Joyce and Marsha Weil – Models of Teaching (first edition)
- Michael Kammen – People of Paradox: An Inquiry Concerning the Origins of American Civilization
- Richard Mabey – Food for Free
- Dennis Meadows et al. – The Limits to Growth
- Elaine Morgan – The Descent of Woman
- Robert Newton Peck – A Day No Pigs Would Die
- Frances Yates – The Rosicrucian Enlightenment
- John Howard Yoder – The Politics of Jesus

== Births ==
- January 1 – Maile Meloy, American novelist and short story writer
- February 11 – Noboru Yamaguchi (山口 登), Japanese light novelist and game scenario author (died 2013)
- March 29 - Ernest Cline, American science-fiction novelist and screenwriter
- May 22 – Max Brooks, American horror author and screenwriter
- May 27 – Maggie O'Farrell, Northern Ireland-born novelist
- July 21 – Josué Guébo, Ivorian writer and academic
- August 6 - Paolo Bacigalupi, American science-fiction and fantasy writer
- August 18 – Adda Djørup, Danish poet and fiction writer
- August 26 - Paula Hawkins, British novelist and journalist
- September 6 – China Miéville, English science fiction novelist
- September 19
  - Cheryl B (Cheryl Burke), American poet and spoken word artist
  - N. K. Jemisin, American science fiction and fantasy writer
- November 4 – Yiyun Li (李翊雲), Chinese American writer of fiction in English
- November 26 - James Dashner, American writer of speculative fiction
- December 20 – Gen Urobuchi, Japanese novelist and screenwriter
- unknown dates
  - Zinnie Harris, British dramatist
  - Rabee Jaber, Lebanese novelist
  - Charlotte Mendelson, English novelist
  - Marente de Moor, Dutch novelist and columnist
  - Ben Rice, English novelist
  - Fran Wilde, American science fiction novelist

== Deaths ==
- January 1 – Eberhard Wolfgang Möller, German playwright and poet (born 1906)
- January 7 – John Berryman, American poet (suicide; born 1914)
- January 8 – Kenneth Patchen, American poet and author (born 1911)
- January 17 – Betty Smith, American novelist (born 1896)
- February 2 – Natalie Clifford Barney, American writer and patron (born 1876)
- February 15 – Edgar Snow, American political writer (cancer, born 1905)
- March 4 – Richard Church, English poet and novelist (born 1893
- March 9 – Violet Trefusis, English writer (born 1894)
- March 11 – Fredric Brown, American genre novelist (born 1906
- March 14 – Giangiacomo Feltrinelli, Italian publisher (born 1926)
- April 10 – Laurence Manning, Canadian science fiction author (born 1899)
- April 16 – Yasunari Kawabata (川端 康成), Japanese fiction writer, Nobel laureate (born 1899)
- May 22 – Cecil Day-Lewis, Irish-born Poet Laureate of the United Kingdom and (as Nicholas Blake) novelist (born 1904)
- May 28 – Violette Leduc, French novelist and memoirist (born 1907)
- June 24 – R. F. Delderfield, English novelist and playwright (born 1912)
- August 2 – Helen Hoyt (Helen Lyman), American poet (born 1887)
- August 9 – Ernst von Salomon, German writer (born 1902)
- August 17 – Alexander Vampilov, Russian dramatist (drowned fishing, born 1937)
- August 22 – Ernestine Hill, Australian travel writer (born 1899)
- September 21 – Henry de Montherlant, French novelist, dramatist and essayist (suicide, born 1895)
- September 27 – S. R. Ranganathan, Indian mathematician and librarian (born 1892)
- October 5 – Ivan Yefremov, Soviet paleontologist and science fiction author (born 1908)
- November 1 – Ezra Pound, American poet (born 1885)
- November 12 – José Nucete Sardi, Venezuelan historian and diplomat (born 1897)
- November 29 – Victor Bridges (Victor George de Freyne), English genre novelist, playwright and poet (born 1878)
- December 10 – Mark Van Doren, American poet, writer and critic (born 1894)
- December 13 – L. P. Hartley, English novelist (born 1895)
- December 23 – Abraham Joshua Heschel, Polish-born American theologian and rabbi (born 1907)
- unknown dates
  - Wasif Jawhariyyeh, Palestinian Arab diarist, poet and composer (born 1897)
  - Donar Munteanu, Romanian poet and magistrate (born 1886)

== Awards ==
- Nobel Prize for Literature: Heinrich Böll

=== Canada ===
- See 1972 Governor General's Awards for a complete list of winners and finalists for those awards.

=== France ===
- Prix Goncourt: Jean Carrière, L'Epervier de Maheux
- Prix Médicis French: Maurice Clavel, Le Tiers des étoiles

=== United Kingdom ===
- Booker Prize: John Berger, G.
- Carnegie Medal for children's literature: Richard Adams, Watership Down
- Cholmondeley Award: Molly Holden, Tom Raworth, Patricia Whittaker
- Eric Gregory Award: Tony Curtis, Richard Berengarten, Brian Oxley, Andrew Greig, Robin Lee, Paul Muldoon
- James Tait Black Memorial Prize:
  - Fiction: John Berger, G
  - Biography: Quentin Bell, Virginia Woolf

=== United States ===
- American Academy of Arts and Letters Gold Medal for the novel, Eudora Welty
- Hugo Award:
  - Best Novel: Philip José Farmer, To Your Scattered Bodies Go
  - Best Novella: Poul Anderson, The Queen of Air and Darkness
- National Book Award: Flannery O'Connor, The Complete Stories
- Nebula Award: Isaac Asimov, The Gods Themselves
- Newbery Medal for children's literature: Robert C. O'Brien, Mrs. Frisby and the Rats of NIMH
- Pulitzer Prize:
  - Drama: Not awarded
  - Fiction: Wallace Stegner, Angle of Repose
  - Poetry: James Wright, Collected Poems

=== Elsewhere ===
- Friedenspreis des Deutschen Buchhandels: Janusz Korczak
- Miles Franklin Award: Thea Astley, The Acolyte
- Premio Nadal: José María Carrascal, Groovy
- Viareggio Prize: Romano Bilenchi, Il bottone di Stalingrado

== Notes ==
- Hahn, Daniel (2015). The Oxford Companion to Children's Literature (2nd ed.). Oxford. University Press. ISBN 9780198715542.
