= The Man Without a Face (disambiguation) =

The Man Without a Face is a 1993 movie.

It can also refer to:

- The Man Without a Face (1935 film)
- The Man Without a Face (1928 serial)
- The Man Without a Face: The Unlikely Rise of Vladimir Putin
- The Man Without a Face (novel)
- Markus Wolf, nicknamed "the man without a face"
