= Soup (novel) =

1974 children's novel by Robert Newton Peck

- First edition
- Author: Robert Newton Peck
- Language: English
- Publisher: Alfred A. Knopf
- Publication date: 1974
- LC Class: PZ7.P339 So

Soup is a 1974 children's novel by American author Robert Newton Peck. It is the first book in the series.

Its main characters are two boys, Robert (the narrator) and his close friend Luther, better known as "Soup". It takes place during the 1930s in a small town in Vermont, and deals with the daily lives of the main characters. Soup is a well-meaning, but mischievous schemer, constantly coming up with elaborate plans that invariably land him and Robert in trouble. Robert is more sensible but less wily, and frequently finds himself conned into doing Soup's dirty work. However, they are best friends and watch out for one another. Their frequent villains are school bully Janice Riker and Eddy Tacker. Robert is also shown to have a crush on classmate Norma Jean Bissel.

Typical moments include the boys losing their clothes and stealing more from a rummage sale that only has clothing for women, or Soup painting his name on a barn without permission and running the "p" over onto the corner, causing the farmer to yell "'Souf'! I'll get you 'Souf'!"

There are several sequels to this book, including Soup and Me, Soup for President, Soup on Fire, Soup's Hoop, and Soup 1776. Soup and Me and Soup For President were adapted into half-hour television episodes starring Christian Berrigan and Shane Sinutko for the series The ABC Weekend Special. The author, Robert Newton Peck, also wrote the popular book A Day No Pigs Would Die.

== Books in the Soup series ==
- Soup (Knopf, 1974)
- Soup and Me (Knopf, 1975)
- Soup for President (Knopf, 1978)
- Soup's Drum (Knopf, 1980)
- Soup on Wheels (Knopf, 1981)
- Soup in the Saddle (Knopf, 1983)
- Soup's Goat (Knopf, 1984)
- Soup on Ice (Knopf, 1985)
- Soup on Fire (Knopf, 1987)
- Soup's Uncle (Delacorte, 1988)
- Soup's Hoop (Delacorte, 1990)
- Soup in Love (Delacorte, 1992)
- Soup Ahoy (Delacorte, 1994)
- Soup 1776 (Knopf/Random House, 1995)

=== Little Soup series ===
A series for younger readers:

- Little Soup's Birthday (Dell, 1991)
- Little Soup's Turkey (Dell, 1992)
- Little Soup's Bunny (Dell, 1993)
