= The Wump World =

Book by Bill Peet

- The Wump World cover
- Author: Bill Peet
- Publisher: Houghton Mifflin
- Publication date: January 1, 1970
- ISBN: 978-0-395-19841-4

The Wump World (1970) is a children's book by American writer Bill Peet that takes place on an imaginary planet. It is about the near destruction of the only habitat of creatures known as Wumps. These Wumps look somewhat like a cross between a capybara (sometimes called a water hog) and a moose.

== Plot ==
The story about these Wumps takes place on their own planet, hence the name The Wump World. It is a small version of Earth, containing only a few rivers and lakes, along with several grasslands and forests. A race of blue humanoids named the Pollutians, who have left their old worn out planet to search for a new home, arrive and overrun the Wump World, causing the Wumps to flee to the safety of caves. The Pollutians build great cities and colonize, dirtying the air, water, and plowing down entire forests and grasslands, which the Wumps rely on for food and water. The Pollutians reach trouble when the air becomes too polluted, and their leaders send scouts to search for another planet. One scout returns, claiming that he has found a bigger and better world (presumably Earth); upon hearing this news, the entire Pollutian populace leaves the planet, leaving their thickly polluted cities behind. When the world above grows quiet, the Wumps emerge to find a changed world, a deserted "concrete jungle". The Pollutians, having used up almost every natural resource, have left. Fortunately for the Wumps, they find a part of the world still filled with living plant life (including trees and grass) and a river. As time goes by, the pollution begins to clear up and the cities slowly begin to age and fall apart. Though the book ends with a message of hope about nature's ability to recover and a small plant sprouting up between the cracks of a sidewalk, and says that in time the planet will heal, it notes that the Wump World would never be quite the same.

The book is similar to Peet's previous work Farewell to Shady Glade. Dr. Seuss's The Lorax, another similar book, was also published the year after.
