= Bump in the Night (novel) =

1988 suspense novel by Isabelle Holland

- First edition cover
- Author: Isabelle Holland
- Language: English
- Genre: Novel
- Publisher: Doubleday
- Publication date: October 1988
- Publication place: United States
- Media type: Print (Hardback)
- Pages: 185 pp
- ISBN: 0-385-23891-6
- OCLC: 17549157
- Dewey Decimal: 813/.54 19
- LC Class: PS3558.O3485 B84 1988

Bump in the Night is a 1988 suspense novel by Isabelle Holland. It describes the abduction of a little boy by a child molester working with a producer of child pornography movies.

== Plot summary ==
Divorcee Martha Tierney awakes to a phone call from the headmistress of her son's school telling her that Jonathan, her son, is not at school. Martha, an alcoholic, is disoriented.

Jonathan sneaks out early in the morning for a secret meeting with his father at a doughnut shop at 8 A.M. Jonathan leaves the house early and stops by a neighbor who tells him that the chosen doughnut shop is closed and he will have to meet his father in the street.

Jonathan is stalked by Lawrence Miller, a former professor who has lost his job over accusations of child molestation. When Patrick fails to show at the doughnut shop, Lawrence pretends to be a friend of Jonathan's father and lures him off to the zoo, then on to an apartment that doubles as a film studio for child pornography movies.

Patrick, Martha, the neighbors, and investigating detective Sergeant Mooney all work together to hunt for the little boy. Jonathan uses all his courage and resourcefulness to escape the sexual abuse that he knows is coming.

== Reception ==
Kirkus Reviews wrote that Bump in the Night was "swift-paced, convincing, and absorbing--a small gem of suspense."

== Adaptations ==
In 1991, Bump in the Night was adapted into a made-for-television film starring Christopher Reeve, Meredith Baxter-Birney, and Corey Carrier. Reception for the movie was mixed to positive, with the Pittsburgh Post-Gazette stating that the second half of the movie "takes away" from the kidnapping in the first part of the film, but "as made-for-TV movies go, Bump in the Night stumbles infrequently". The Los Angeles Times praised the casting and pacing.
