= Encore for Eleanor =

Book by Bill Peet

Front cover, designed by Bill Peet

Encore for Eleanor is a children's picture book written by Bill Peet. It is about a circus elephant who loves the spotlight even after retirement. It was originally published in 1981 by the Houghton Mifflin Co., Boston.

== Plot ==
Eleanor the elephant is the only circus elephant to ever had performed her act while walking on a tall pair of stilts. After a terrible fall, she is forced into retirement. As she rides away from the circus in a truck, she quakes from her trunk to her toes wondering where she is going. She ends up in a neat little red barn in the city zoo, under a shady sycamore tree. But Eleanor is not happy unless she can do something clever to earn her keep. One day she discovers she has a talent for drawing, and the amazed zoo director sets up a show for her so she can once again hear people calling out "Encore for Eleanor, once more Eleanor once more!".

== Errors ==
•The text says that Eleanor's mass is 7 tons, like that of the truck that brings her to the zoo. However, she is a female Asiatic elephant, which means that her mass is about 3 tons.

•In the third and fourth illustrations, Eleanor's stilts are too short. In the first illustration, they appear to be about 20 feet long, but they appear to be 16 feet long in the third illustration and only 10 feet long in the fourth illustration.
