= Shock Treatment (1995 film) =

Shock Treatment is a 1995 TV film directed by Michael Schultz. It received one nomination for best visual effects at the 1996 Gemini Awards.

== Cast ==
- Matthew Walker as The Shock
- Corey Carrier as Jake Grant
- David Eisner as Mr. Grant
- Mark Hildreth as Craig Grant
- Eric Murphy as Joe Garrison
- Benjamin Plener as Tommy Blizzard
- Caterina Scorsone as Robyn Belmore
- Gwynyth Walsh as Mrs. Grant
