= Kermit the Hermit =

1965 picture book by Bill Peet

- First edition
- Author: Bill Peet
- Illustrator: Bill Peet
- Language: English
- Genre: Picture book
- Publisher: Houghton Mifflin
- Publication date: 1965
- Media type: Print (Paperback)
- Pages: 45
- ISBN: 978-0-395-29607-3
- OCLC: 306248

Kermit the Hermit is a children's picture book written and illustrated by Bill Peet. It was first published in 1965. It tells the story of a greedy crab who collects and hoards all sorts of unnecessary things. Peet said he got the idea for the book from sketching crabs stacked on ice in the sea food display of a supermarket. It has been printed in six editions and is still in print as of 2008.

"The illustrations are touched with inspired lunacy (as is the rhyme) and the color is arresting. This is Peet's best since Chester, which was his best since Randy's Dandy Lions, which was his best since Ella, etc., etc., etc"

— Kirkus Reviews

== Plot summary ==
Kermit is a selfish Pacific rock crab who lives in a castle-shaped rock and hoards lots of junk; he does not like sharing his collection. One day, when Kermit attempts to gain another unnecessary thing, he is almost buried by an Irish setter, but is saved by an impoverished boy. Kermit is grateful and wants to repay the boy, but cannot think of a way to do so. He first tries to help him catch a fish and although a big fish manages to hook the line, it breaks and Kermit is dragged across the ocean while holding onto the line that's still in the fish's mouth. He lands near a sunken pirate ship and hides in a chest of gold to avoid a blue shark. As he stores the gold pieces in his cave while making multiple trips back and forth while avoiding other predators, e.g. groupers and barracuda, he slowly gives up one thing at a time, until he has all of the gold (approximately 182 coins) and no more possessions in his cave. With the help of a brown pelican, Kermit drops coins down the boy's chimney. The boy's family becomes rich (though the family have no idea who gave them the gold) and Kermit learns the value of sharing.
