= Corey Carrier =

American former child actor (born 1980)

- Born: Corey Thomas Carrier; August 20, 1980 (age 46); Middleborough, Massachusetts, United States
- Occupation: Actor
- Years active: 1987–2000
- Spouse: Laura Carrier

Corey Thomas Carrier (born August 20, 1980) is an American former child actor, also known as just "Core". He is best known as playing Indiana Jones, aged 8–10, in The Young Indiana Jones Chronicles.

Carrier was born in Middleborough, Massachusetts to Thomas and Carleen. He has a younger sister named Bethany. He attended an acting school at The Priscilla Beach Children's Theatre Workshop. When he was a child, his hobbies included baseball, gymnastics, wrestling, fencing, guitar, ice skating, and basketball.

He attended Clark University in Worcester, Massachusetts as an undergraduate.

== Filmography ==
=== Film ===
Year	Title	Role	Notes
1987	The Witches of Eastwick	Lenox School Band (cymbals)	
1990	Men Don't Leave	Winston Buckley	
1990	Crazy People	Uncredited	
1990	My Blue Heaven	Tommie	
1990	After Dark, My Sweet	Jack	
1991	Bump in the Night	Jonathan Tierney	
1994	Savage Land	Luke Morgan	
1995	Bushwhacked	Ralph	
1995	Nixon	Richard Nixon age 12	
1996	The Adventures of Pinocchio	Lampwick	
2000	When the Time Comes	Jess	Short Film

=== Television ===
Year(s)	Title	Role	Notes
1985	Young People's Specials	Martin	Episode: ''Nags''
1987	When the Time Comes	Jess	TV film
1987	The Equalizer	Mickey Robertson	Episode: "Christmas Presence"
1991	Bump in the Night	Jonathan Tierney	TV movie
1992-1993	The Young Indiana Jones Chronicles	Henry "Indiana" Jones, Jr. (age 8–10)	Episodes: "Young Indiana Jones and the Curse of the Jackal"; "British East Africa, September 1909"; "Vienna, November 1908"; "Paris, September 1908"; "Peking, March 1910"; "Benares, January 1910"; "Florence, May 1908" (shown in Europe, but not the USA)
1994	Treasure Island: The Adventure Begins	Robbie Wallace	TV movie
1995	Shock Treatment	Jake Grant	TV movie
1996	The Adventures of Young Indiana Jones: Travels with Father	Henry "Indiana" Jones, Jr. (age 10)	TV movie (related with series)
2000	The Adventures of Young Indiana Jones: My First Adventure	Henry "Indiana" Jones, Jr. (age 8)	Re-edited series episodes in one chapter (include an introduction narrated by Carrier): "Young Indiana Jones and the Curse of the Jackal" (first half only); "Tangiers, May 1908" (new segment)
2000	The Adventures of Young Indiana Jones: Journey of Radiance	Henry "Indiana" Jones, Jr. (age 10)	Re-edited series episodes in one chapter (include new bridging segments): "Benares, January 1910"; "Peking, March 1910"
2000	The Adventures of Young Indiana Jones: Passion for Life	Henry "Indiana" Jones, Jr. (age 9)	Re-edited series episodes in one chapter (include new bridging segments): "British East Africa, September 1909"; "Paris, September 1908"
2000	The Adventures of Young Indiana Jones: The Perils of Cupid	Henry "Indiana" Jones, Jr. (age 9)	Re-edited series episodes in one chapter (include new bridging segments): "Vienna, November 1908"; "Florence, May 1908"
2001	The Adventures of Young Indiana Jones: Travels with Father	Henry "Indiana" Jones, Jr. (age 10)	Re-edited TV film (include new bridging segments)
