= The Young Indiana Jones Chronicles =

American television series (1992–1996)

- Also known as: The Adventures of Young Indiana Jones
- Genre: Action; Adventure
- Created by: George Lucas
- Based on: Characters by: George Lucas; Philip Kaufman
- Developed by: George Lucas
- Starring: Sean Patrick Flanery; Corey Carrier; George Hall; Ronny Coutteure
- Narrated by: George Hall
- Theme music composer: Laurence Rosenthal
- Composers: Laurence Rosenthal; Joel McNeely
- Country of origin: United States
- Original language: English
- No. of seasons: 2
- No. of episodes: 28 (+ 4 TV films) (list of episodes)

Production
- Executive producer: George Lucas
- Producer: Rick McCallum
- Cinematography: David Tattersall
- Camera setup: Single-camera setup
- Running time: approx. 45 min. per episode
- Production companies: Amblin Television; Lucasfilm Ltd. Television; Paramount Television

Original release
- Network: ABC; The Family Channel
- Release: March 4, 1992 – June 16, 1996

Related
- Indiana Jones

The Young Indiana Jones Chronicles (sometimes referred to as Young Indy) is an American television series that aired on ABC from March 4, 1992 to June 16, 1996. Filming took place in various locations around the world, with "Old Indy" bookend segments filmed in Wilmington, North Carolina, and on the campus of the University of North Carolina at Wilmington. The series was a Lucasfilm Television production in association with Amblin Entertainment and Paramount Television.

The series explores the childhood, adolescence and early adulthood of the fictional character Indiana Jones and primarily stars Sean Patrick Flanery and Corey Carrier as the title character, with George Hall playing an elderly version of Jones for the bookends of most episodes; though Harrison Ford bookended one episode. The show was created and executive produced by George Lucas, who also created, co-wrote, and executive produced the Indiana Jones feature films.

Due to its large budget and low viewership ratings, the series was canceled in 1993. However, following the series' cancellation, four made-for-television films were produced from 1994 to 1996 in an attempt to continue the series. In 1999, the series was re-edited into 22 television films under the title The Adventures of Young Indiana Jones.

== Overview ==
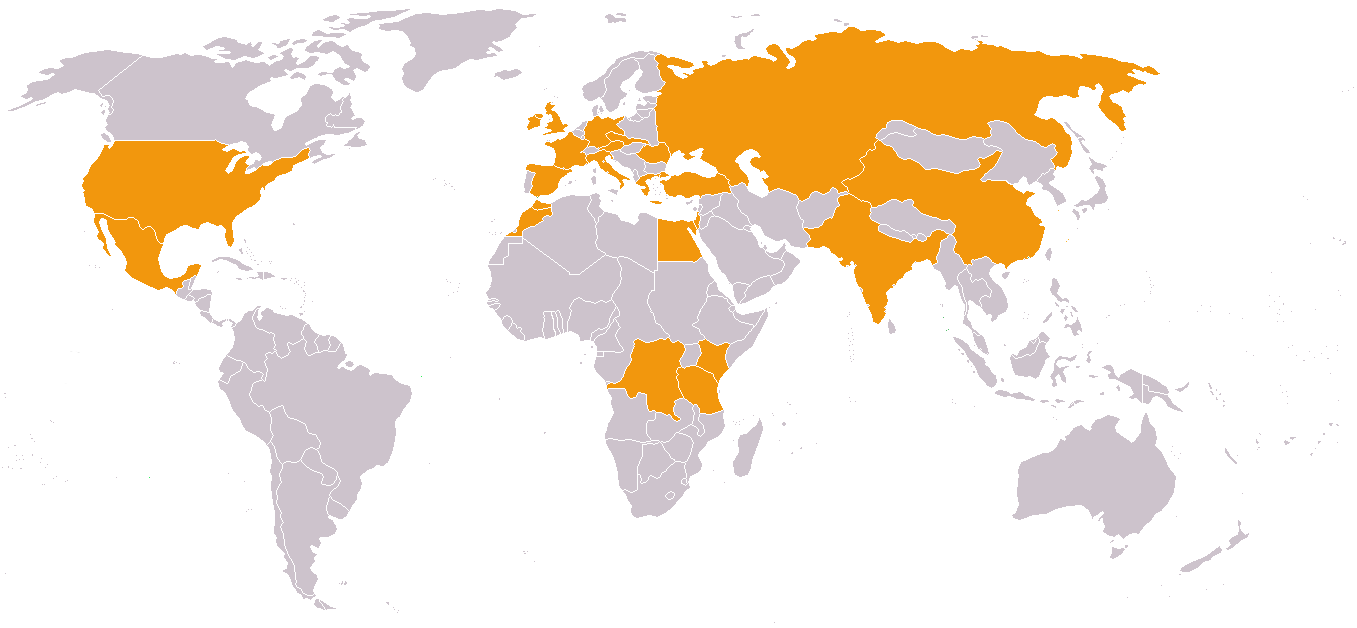
Map of countries Indiana Jones visits in the series

The series was designed as an educational program for children and teenagers, spotlighting historical figures and important events set during the Progressive Era of the 1900s, the 1910s, and the 1920s. Most episodes feature a standard formula of an elderly (93-year-old) Indiana Jones (played by George Hall) in present-day (1992) New York City encountering people who spur him to reminisce and tell stories about his past adventures. These stories would either involve him as a young boy (8 to 10, played by Corey Carrier) or as a teenager and young adult (16 to 21, played by Sean Patrick Flanery). The younger Indy would travel to different parts of the world with his parents and tutor. The older, teenage Indy rebels against his father by joining the Belgian army. Using a fake name, he fights both at Verdun and in Africa. He later becomes a spy. In one episode, a 50-year-old Indy (played by Harrison Ford) is seen reminiscing. Initially, the plan was for the series to alternate between the adventures of Indy as a child (Corey Carrier) and as a teenager/young adult (Sean Patrick Flanery), but eventually the episodes featuring Flanery's version of the character dominated the series. The series' bookends revealed that the elderly Jones has a daughter, grandchildren, and great-grandchildren. The 2008 film Kingdom of the Crystal Skull introduces Mutt Williams as his son with Marion Ravenwood, but the series makes no mention of a son; this is explained by the film Indiana Jones and the Dial of Destiny (2023), which establishes Mutt Williams to have been killed in the Vietnam War.

Many of the episodes involve Indiana meeting and working with famous historical figures. Historical figures featured on the show include Leo Tolstoy, Howard Carter, Charles de Gaulle, and John Ford, in such diverse locations as Egypt, Austria-Hungary, India, China, and the whole of Europe. For example, Curse of the Jackal prominently involves Indy in the adventures of T. E. Lawrence and Pancho Villa. Indy also encounters (in no particular order and not limited to) Edgar Degas, Giacomo Puccini, George Patton, Pablo Picasso (same episode as Degas), Eliot Ness, Charles Nungesser, Al Capone, Manfred von Richthofen, Anthony Fokker, Annie Besant, Charles Webster Leadbeater, Jiddu Krishnamurti, Paul von Lettow-Vorbeck, Paul Robeson, Norman Rockwell (same episode as Degas and Picasso), Louis Armstrong, George Gershwin, Seán O'Casey, Siegfried Sassoon, Patrick Pearse, Winston Churchill, a young Ho Chi Minh, Carl Jung, Sigmund Freud, and Carl Laemmle; at one point, he competes against a young Ernest Hemingway for the affections of a girl but they end up becoming friends, is nursed back to health by Albert Schweitzer, has a passionate tryst with Mata Hari, discusses philosophy with Nikos Kazantzakis, and goes on a safari with Theodore Roosevelt.

The show provided back story for the films. His relationship with his father, first introduced in Last Crusade, was depicted in episodes showing his travels with his father as a young boy and brief times as a young adult. His original hunt for the "Eye of the Peacock", a large diamond seen in Temple of Doom, was a recurring element in several stories. The show also chronicled his activities during World War I and his first solo adventures. Later, in the 2008 film Kingdom of the Crystal Skull, Indy describes his adventures with Pancho Villa (chronicled in the first episode) to Mutt Williams (at the time, his sidekick; later on revealed to be his son). He also mentions his mother Anna to Mutt.

== Cast ==
Clockwise from top left: Corey Carrier, Sean Patrick Flanery, George Hall, and Harrison Ford portrayed Dr. Henry 'Indiana' Jones Jr. in The Young Indiana Jones Chronicles.

Role	Actor	Season		TV movies			
Role	Actor	1	2	1	2	3	4
Henry "Indiana" Jones Jr.	Corey Carrier (age 8–10)	2	5				
Henry "Indiana" Jones Jr.	Sean Patrick Flanery (age 16–21)	5	17				
Henry "Indiana" Jones Jr.	Harrison Ford (age 50)		1				
Henry "Indiana" Jones Jr.	George Hall (age 93–94)	6	20				
Henry Jones Sr.	Lloyd Owen	2	6				
Anna Jones	Ruth de Sosa	2	5				
Miss Helen Seymour	Margaret Tyzack	3	5				
Remy Baudouin	Ronny Coutteure	5	4				
T. E. Lawrence	Joseph A. Bennett (young)	1					
T. E. Lawrence	Douglas Henshall		2				
Ernest Hemingway	Jay Underwood		3				

Role	Actor	Chapter																					
Role	Actor	The Early Years							The War Years								The Years of Change						
Role	Actor	1	2	3	4	5	6	7	8	9	10	11	12	13	14	15	16	17	18	19	20	21	22
Henry "Indiana" Jones Jr.	Corey Carrier (age 8–10)																						
Henry "Indiana" Jones Jr.	Sean Patrick Flanery (age 16–21)																						
Henry "Indiana" Jones Jr.	Harrison Ford (age 50)																						
Henry Jones Sr.	Lloyd Owen																						
Anna Jones	Ruth de Sosa																						
Miss Helen Seymour	Margaret Tyzack																						
Remy Baudouin	Ronny Coutteure																						
T. E. Lawrence	Joseph A. Bennett (young)																						
T. E. Lawrence	Douglas Henshall																						
Ernest Hemingway	Jay Underwood																						

=== Guest appearances ===
Most episodes of the series depicted famous and not-so-famous historical figures, including but not limited to Theodore Roosevelt, T. E. Lawrence, Mustafa Kemal Atatürk, Norman Rockwell, Charles de Gaulle, Leo Tolstoy, Winston Churchill, Ernest Hemingway, Manfred von Richthofen, Paul von Lettow-Vorbeck, George Patton, Al Capone, Pablo Picasso, Giacomo Puccini, Frederick Selous, Franz Ferdinand, Princess Sophie of Hohenberg, Edith Wharton, and Mata Hari.

Notable guest stars (playing either fictional or historical characters) include: Catherine Zeta-Jones, Daniel Craig, Christopher Lee, Clark Gregg, Tom Courtenay, Peter Firth, Vanessa Redgrave, Beata Pozniak, Jennifer Ehle, Elizabeth Hurley, Timothy Spall, Anne Heche, Paul Freeman, Jean-Pierre Castaldi, Jeffrey Wright, Jeroen Krabbé, Jason Flemyng, Michael Kitchen, Kevin McNally, Francisco Quinn, Ian McDiarmid, Max von Sydow, Douglas Henshall, Jon Pertwee, Sean Pertwee, Vincenzo Nicoli, Terry Jones, Keith David, Lukas Haas, Frank Vincent, Jay Underwood, Michael Gough, Maria Charles, Elsa Zylberstein, Isaach de Bankolé, Emil Abossolo-Mbo, Haluk Bilginer, Roshan Seth and Saginaw Grant.

== Production ==
=== Development ===
During the production of the Indiana Jones feature films, the cast and crew frequently questioned creator George Lucas about the Indiana Jones character's life growing up. During the concept stages of Indiana Jones and the Last Crusade, Lucas and director Steven Spielberg decided to reveal some of this backstory in the film's opening scenes. For these scenes, Lucas chose River Phoenix to portray the character, as Harrison Ford believed that Phoenix most resembled Ford as a young man. Phoenix had appeared as the son of Ford's character in The Mosquito Coast. This decision to reveal an adventure of a young Indiana led Lucas to the idea of creating the series. The total budget for the series was $27 million while each episode cost $1.7 million.

=== Writing ===
Lucas wrote an extensive timeline detailing the life of Indiana Jones, assembling the elements for about 70 episodes, starting in 1905 and leading all the way up to the feature films. Each outline included the place, date and the historical persons Indy would meet in that episode, and would then be turned over to one of the series writers. When the series came to an end about 31 of the 70 stories had been filmed. Had the series been renewed for a third season, Young Indy would have been introduced to younger versions of characters from Raiders of the Lost Ark: Abner Ravenwood ("Jerusalem, June 1909") and René Belloq ("Honduras, December 1920"). Other episodes would have filled in the blanks between existing ones ("Le Havre, June 1916", "Berlin, Late August, 1916"), and there would even have been some adventures starring a five-year-old Indy (including "Princeton, May 1905").

During production of the series, Lucas became interested in the crystal skulls. He originally called for an episode which would have been part of the third season involving Jones and his then friend Belloq searching for one of the skulls. The episode was never produced, and the idea ultimately evolved into the 2008 feature film Indiana Jones and the Kingdom of the Crystal Skull.

=== Casting ===
Phoenix and Ford were respectively approached by Lucas to reprise their roles as the younger and elder Indiana Jones respectively, but both turned the offer down as they had no desire to do television, the former not wishing to return to it after struggling hard to move on from sitcoms to film and the latter feeling back then that it didn't have anything to offer to his career. Ultimately, Corey Carrier was cast as a 10-year-old Indy while Sean Patrick Flanery was cast as a young adult Indy, with George Hall portraying a 90-year-old Indy in the bookend segments of most episodes.

A number of actors connected to the Indiana Jones films and/or George Lucas's Star Wars franchise made guest appearances. Harrison Ford appeared as a middle-aged Indy (age 50) in the episode "Young Indiana Jones and the Mystery of the Blues", which aired in March 1993. Paul Freeman, who played Rene Belloq in Raiders of the Lost Ark, portrayed Frederick Selous in a couple of episodes, while Roshan Seth, who played Chattar Lal in Indiana Jones and the Temple of Doom, played a North African sheikh in "Morocco, 1917" (later re-edited into "Tales of Innocence"). The late William Hootkins (Major Eaton from Raiders of the Lost Ark and Porkins from Star Wars) played Russian ballet producer Sergei Diaghilev and Wolf Kahler (Colonel Dietrich in Raiders of the Lost Ark) played a German diplomat in "Barcelona, May 1917". In the episode Attack of the Hawkmen, Star Wars veteran Anthony Daniels played François, a French Intelligence scientist (in the mode of James Bond's "Q") who gives Indy a special suitcase filled with gadgets for a special mission in Germany. Clint Eastwood was approached to play the elder brother of Indiana Jones, but he turned it down despite a $10 million offer.

=== Filming ===
A variety of filmmakers wrote or directed episodes of the series, including Frank Darabont, Nicolas Roeg, Mike Newell, Deepa Mehta, Joe Johnston, Jonathan Hensleigh, Terry Jones, Simon Wincer, Carrie Fisher, Dick Maas and Vic Armstrong. Lucas was given a "Story By" credit in many episodes as he was the creative overhead on the series pitching most of the storylines the writers would then flesh out under his supervision.

The series was unusual for its time in that it was shot on location around the world. Partly to offset the cost of this, the series was shot on 16mm film, rather than 35mm. The series was designed so that each pair of episodes could either be broadcast separately, or as a 2-hour film-length episode. The filming with Young Indy usually took around three weeks. The first production filming alternated between "Sean" and "Corey" episodes. The segments with old Indy were referred to as "bookends." Filming a pair of them typically took a day and most were shot at Carolco Studios in Wilmington, North Carolina and on location in Wilmington. The show also featured footage from other films spliced into several episodes. Additionally the series had an audio format of Dolby Stereo.

The series was shot in three stages. The first production occurred from 1991 to 1992, and consisted of sixteen episodes; five with younger Indy, ten with older Indy, and one with both. The second production occurred from 1992 to 1993 and consisted of twelve episodes; one with younger Indy and eleven with older Indy. The third and final production occurred from 1994 to 1995, and consisted of four made-for-television movies. In 1996, additional filming was done in order to re-edit the entire series into twenty-two feature films.

== Soundtrack ==
The series' main theme was composed by Laurence Rosenthal, who wrote much of the music for the series. Joel McNeely also wrote music for many episodes; he received an Emmy in 1993 for the Episode "Scandal of 1920". French composer Frédéric Talgorn composed some music for the episode set in World War I France ("The Somme, July 1916/Germany, August 1916"). Music for "Transylvania, September 1918" was composed by Curt Sobel.

== Broadcast history ==
=== Television ===
Season	Episodes	Originally released		
Season	Episodes	First released	Last released	Network
1	6	March 4, 1992	April 8, 1992	ABC
2	22	September 21, 1992	July 24, 1993	ABC
TV films	4	October 15, 1994	June 16, 1996	The Family Channel

The pilot episode was aired by ABC in the United States in March 1992. The pilot, the feature-length Young Indiana Jones and the Curse of the Jackal, was later re-edited as two separate episodes, "Egypt, May 1908" and "Mexico, March 1916." Eleven further hour-long episodes were aired in 1992 (seven in the first season, four were part of the second season) – during the second season, it was placed as the lead-in to Monday Night Football, just as fellow Paramount series MacGyver had done for the previous six years. Only 16 of the remaining 20 episodes were aired in 1993 when ABC canceled the show. The Family Channel later produced four two-hour TV movies that were broadcast from 1994 to 1996. Though Lucas intended to produce episodes leading up to a 24-year-old Jones, the series was cancelled with the character at age 21.

=== Home media ===
The revised and updated edition of the book George Lucas: The Creative Impulse, by Charles Champlin, explains how The Young Indiana Jones Chronicles series would be re-edited into the new structure of twenty-two Chapter TV films, for the 1999 VHS release. New footage was shot in 1996 to be incorporated with the newly re-edited and re-titled "chapters" to better help it chronologically and provide smooth transitions. The newly shot Tangiers, 1908 was joined with Egypt, 1908 from the Curse of the Jackal to form My First Adventure, and Morocco, 1917 was joined with Northern Italy, 1918 (now re-dated as 1917) to form Tales of Innocence. Also included in the home video release were four unaired episodes made for the ABC network: Florence, May 1908; Prague, 1917; Transylvania, 1918; and Palestine, 1917. The series itself was also re-titled as The Adventures of Young Indiana Jones.

The 93-year-old Indy bookends for the original series were removed, as well as Sean Patrick Flanery's bookend for "Travels with Father"; however, the Harrison Ford bookend, set in 1950, from "Mystery of the Blues" was not cut.

==== Laserdisc and VHS ====
The series received its first home video release on April 21, 1993, when a Laserdisc box set was released in Japan containing fifteen of the earlier episodes and a short documentary on the making of the series. The discs were formatted in NTSC and presented with English audio in Dolby surround with Japanese subtitles. In 1994, eight NTSC format VHS tapes with a total of fifteen episodes from the first two seasons were released in Japan.

On October 26, 1999, half of the series was released on VHS in the United States for $14.99 each, along with a box set of the feature films. The series was labeled as Chapters 1–22, while the feature films were labeled as Chapters 23–25. In an effort to promote the series, the episode "Treasure of the Peacock's Eye" was included with the purchase of the movie trilogy box set in the US. The episode was chosen for the fact that its plot continues into the opening of Indiana Jones and the Temple of Doom, which was labeled as the first film chronologically in the film trilogy.

In other countries different chapters were included, for example in the UK The Phantom Train of Doom was included. The twelve VHS releases were released worldwide over the course of 2000, including the UK, Netherlands, Hungary, Germany, Mexico, France and Japan. The UK, German, French, Hungarian and Netherlands tapes were in PAL format, while the tapes released in the rest of the countries were in NTSC format.

==== DVD ====
In 2002, series producer Rick McCallum confirmed in an interview with Variety that DVDs of the series were in development, but would not be released for "about three or four years". At the October 2005 press conference for the Star Wars: Episode III – Revenge of the Sith DVD, McCallum explained that he expected the release to consist of 22 DVDs, which would include around 100 documentaries which would explore the real-life historical aspects that are fictionalized in the show. For the DVDs, Lucasfilm upgraded the picture quality of the original 16 mm prints and remastered the soundtracks. This, along with efforts to get best quality masters and bonus materials on the sets, delayed the release. It was ultimately decided that the release would tie into the release of the fourth Indiana Jones feature film.

Two variations of Volume 1 were released by CBS DVD, one simply as "Volume One", and the other as "Volume One — The Early Years" in order to match the subtitle of Volume 2.

The History Channel acquired television rights to all 94 of the DVD historical documentaries. The airing of the documentaries was meant to bring in ratings for the History Channel and serve as marketing for the DVD release and the theatrical release of Indiana Jones and the Kingdom of the Crystal Skull. The History Channel and History International began airing the series every Saturday morning at 7AM/6C on The History Channel, and every Sunday morning at 8AM ET/PT on History International. A new division of History.com was created devoted to the show. As Paramount and Lucasfilm had already reserved IndianaJones.com solely for news and updates related to Indiana Jones and the Kingdom of the Crystal Skull, StarWars.com temporarily served as the official site for the DVDs—providing regular updates, insider looks and promotions related to them. However, Lucasfilm and Paramount soon set up an official website proper for the series—YoungIndy.com. Paramount released a press kit for the media promoting the DVDs, which consists of a .pdf file and several videos with interviews with Lucas and McCallum, and footage from the DVDs. A trailer for the DVDs was also published on YoungIndy.com, with a shorter version being shown on The History Channel and History International.

Lucas and McCallum hope that the DVDs will be helpful to schools, as they believe the series is a good way to aid in teaching history. Lucas explained that the series' DVD release will be shopped as "films for a modern day high school history class." He believes the series is a good way to teach high school students 20th-century history. The plan was always to tie the DVD release of the series to the theatrical release of the fourth Indiana Jones feature film, Indiana Jones and the Kingdom of the Crystal Skull, which was released on May 22, 2008.

==== Companion historical documentaries ====
Ninety-four historical documentaries were created over a nearly five-year period by Lucasfilm's documentary crew for the DVD release of the series. Each documentary covers a historical topic connected to the chapter to which it is associated. The television broadcast rights for these documentaries was secured by the History Channel. They were executive produced by Lucas and McCallum.

From Volume One, The Early Years

My First Adventure Special Features (Vol. 1 Disc 1)

- Archaeology – Unearthing Our Past
- Howard Carter and the Tomb of Tutankhamun
- Colonel Lawrence's War – T.E. Lawrence and Arabia
- From Slavery to Freedom

Passion for Life Special Features (Vol. 1 Disc 3)

- Theodore Roosevelt and The American Century
- Ecology – Pulse of the Planet
- American Dreams – Norman Rockwell and the Saturday Evening Post
- Art Rebellion – The Making of the Modern
- Edgar Degas – Reluctant Rebel
- Braque & Picasso – A Collaboration Cubed

The Perils of Cupid Special Features (Vol. 1 Disc 5)

- The Archduke's Last Journey – End of an Era. Meeting Sophie
- Carl Jung and the Journey to Self Discovery
- Giacomo Puccini – Music of the Heart
- Sigmund Freud – Exploring the Unconscious
- It's Opera!
- Powder Keg – Europe 1900 to 1914
- Psychology – Charting the Human Mind

Travels with Father Special Features (Vol. 1 Disc 6)

- Seeking Truth – The Life of Leo Tolstoy
- Unquiet Voices – Russian Writers and the State
- Aristotle – Creating Foundations
- Ancient Questions – Philosophy and Our Search for Meaning

Journey of Radiance Special Features (Vol. 1 Disc 7)

- Jiddu Krishnamurti – The Reluctant Messiah
- Annie Besant – An Unlikely Rebel
- Medicine in the Middle Kingdom
- Eastern Spirituality – The Road to Enlightenment

Spring Break Adventure Special Features (Vol. 1 Disc 9)

- Thomas Edison – Lighting Up the World
- Invention and Innovation – What's Behind a Good Idea?
- The Mystery of Edward Stratemeyer
- Wanted: Dead or Alive – Pancho Villa and the American Invasion of Mexico
- General John J. Pershing and His American Army
- George S. Patton – American Achilles

Love's Sweet Song Special Features (Vol 1. Disc 10)

- Easter Rising – The Poets' Rebellion
- The Passions of William Butler Yeats
- Sean O'Casey vs. Ireland
- Ireland – The Power of the Poets
- Winston Churchill – The Lion's Roar
- Demanding the Vote – The Pankhursts and British Suffrage
- Fighting for the Vote – Women's Suffrage in America

Interactive Bonus Disc (Vol 1. Disc 11)

- Interactive Timeline
- Historical Lecture: The Promise of Progress
- Revolution Interactive Game

From Volume Two, The War Years

Trenches of Hell Special Features (Vol 2. Disc 1)

- Siegfried Sassoon – A War Poet's Journey
- Robert Graves and the White Goddess
- I Am France – The Myth of Charles de Gaulle
- The Somme – A Storm of Steel

Demons of Deception Special Features (Vol 2. Disc 2)

- Marshal Pétain's Fall from Grace
- Flirting with Danger – The Fantasy of Mata Hari
- Into the Furnace – The Battle of Verdun
- Reading the Enemy's Mind – Espionage in World War I

Phantom Train of Doom Special Features (Vol 2. Disc 3)

- Chasing the Phantom – Paul von Lettow-Vorbeck
- Dreaming of Africa – The Life of Frederick Selous
- At Home and Abroad – The Two Faces of Jan Smuts

Oganga, The Giver and Taker of Life Special Features (Vol 2. Disc 4)

- Albert Schweitzer – Reverence for Life
- Waging Peace – The Rise of Pacifism
- Congo – A Curse of Riches

Attack of the Hawkmen Special Features (Vol 2. Disc 5)

- War in the Third Dimension – Aerial Warfare in World War I
- Blood Red – The Life and Death of Manfred von Richthofen
- Flying High for France – The Lafayette Escadrille
- Anthony Fokker – The Flying Dutchman

Adventures in the Secret Service Special Features (Vol 2. Disc 6)

- Karl – The Last Habsburg Emperor
- The Russian Revolution – All Power to the Soviets!
- V.I. Lenin – History Will Not Forgive Us

Espionage Escapades Special Features (Vol 2. Disc 7)

- Impresario – Sergei Diaghilev and the Ballets Russes
- Ballet – The Art of Dance
- Franz Kafka's Dark Truth

Daredevils of the Desert Special Features (Vol 2. Disc 8)

- Lines in the Sand – The Middle East and the Great War
- Col. Lawrence's War – T.E. Lawrence and Arabia (note: repeated from Vol 1. Disc 1)

From Volume Three, The Years of Change

Tales of Innocence (Vol. 3 Disc 1)

- Unhealed Wounds – The Life of Ernest Hemingway
- The Secret Life of Edith Wharton
- Lowell Thomas – American Storyteller
- The French Foreign Legion – The World's Most Legendary Fighting Force

Masks of Evil (Vol. 3 Disc 2)

- For the People, Despite the People – The Atatürk Revolution
- The Greedy Heart of Halide Edib
- Dracula – Fact and Fiction
- The Ottoman Empire – A World of Difference

Treasure of the Peacock's Eye (Vol. 3 Disc 3)

- Bronisław Malinowski – God Professor
- Anthropology – Looking at the Human Condition
- New Guinea – Paradise in Peril

Winds of Change (Vol. 3 Disc 5)

- Woodrow Wilson – American Idealist
- Gertrude Bell – Iraq's Uncrowned Queen
- Ho Chi Minh – The Price of Freedom
- Paul Robeson – Scandalize My Name
- Robert Goddard – Mr. Rocket Science
- The Best Intentions – The Paris Peace Conference and the Treaty of Versailles

Mystery of the Blues (Vol. 3 Disc 7)

- Al "Scarface" Capone – The Original Gangster
- Ben Hecht – Shakespeare of Hollywood
- On the Trail of Eliot Ness
- Louis Armstrong – Ambassador of Jazz
- Jazz – Rhythms of Freedom
- Prohibition – America on the Rocks
- Hellfighters – Harlem's Heroes of World War I

The Scandal of 1920 (Vol. 3 Disc 8)

- Tin Pan Alley – Soundtrack of America
- Broadway – America Center Stage
- Wonderful Nonsense – The Algonquin Round Table

Hollywood Follies (Vol. 3 Disc 9)

- Erich von Stroheim – The Profligate Genius
- The World of John Ford
- Irving Thalberg – Hollywood's Boy Wonder
- The Rise of the Moguls – The Men Who Built Hollywood

Historical overview lectures

- Vol. 1 – Historical Lecture: "The Promise of Progress"
- Vol. 2 – Historical Lecture: "War and Revolution"
- Vol. 3 – Historical Lecture: "New Gods for Old"

Content here was copied from which has a compatible CC-BY-SA-3.0 license: http://indianajones.wikia.com/wiki/List_of_The_Adventures_of_Young_Indiana_Jones_DVD_additional_features

DVD name	Region 1	Region 2
The Adventures of Young Indiana Jones: Volume One — The Early Years	October 23, 2007	February 25, 2008
The Adventures of Young Indiana Jones: Volume Two — The War Years	December 18, 2007	March 24, 2008
The Adventures of Young Indiana Jones: Volume Three — The Years of Change	April 29, 2008	April 28, 2008

Streaming

As of 2023, the series was available to stream on Disney+ for American subscribers only alongside the original four Indiana Jones feature films, to commemorate the release of Indiana Jones and the Dial of Destiny. The series was removed from Disney+ in the United States for unknown reasons in May 2024.

== Reception ==
The series was nominated for 18 Emmy Awards and won 6. In 1993, Corey Carrier was nominated for the Young Artist Award in the category of "Best Young Actor Starring in a Television Series". In 1994, David Tattersall was nominated for the ASC Award in the category of "Outstanding Achievement in Cinematography in Regular Series". At the 1994 Golden Globes, the series was nominated for "Best TV-Series — Drama".

Though the series won many awards, it also received some criticism. The New York Times called the pilot "clunky" for example. Ken Tucker, reviewing the pilot episode for Entertainment Weekly, wrote: "I think Chronicles is a beautifully produced show based on a faulty premise." Tucker added "Lucas has set out to make history so vivid and exciting that kids will be racing to their history books to find out more. Without prior knowledge of T.E. Lawrence, however, the character in Chronicles is a pretentious drag; similarly, without a context, Pancho Villa is just an anarchic vulgarian — Abbie Hoffman in a sombrero."

== Marketing ==
Four volumes of music from the series were released on CD. The show also spawned a series of adaptations and spin-off novels, a NES game The Young Indiana Jones Chronicles developed and published by Jaleco, a Sega Mega Drive/Genesis game Instruments of Chaos starring Young Indiana Jones, trading cards and other products.
