= Cyrus the Unsinkable Sea Serpent =

1975 children's book by Bill Peet

Cyrus the Unsinkable Sea Serpent is a children's book written by Bill Peet and published in 1975.

It is about a good-heart giant sea serpent who decides to assist a ship of immigrants who experience a dangerous voyage.

== Synopsis ==
Cyrus is a giant sea-serpent who only preys on sardines and is feeling bored at being alone at sea. When a shark suggests that he attack a ship and eat the humans on it, Cyrus refuses and is insulted as being a wimp by the shark for that. Stung by that abuse, Cyrus decides to find a port and attack the first ship that leaves it.

Cyrus finds such a port and soon a ship of immigrants, The Primrose, embarks despite dire warnings by an old man in port that they will never survive the voyage. With that spiteful outburst, Cyrus' aggressive mood is broken enough to allow his good nature to reassert and he is concerned about the ship and the people on it. As such, Cyrus follows the ship out of sight.

Sure enough, the ship faces a series of dire perils such as doldrums of worryingly indeterminate length, a violent storm that threatens to sink the ship and an attack by pirates that pursue and demast the ship by cannon fire prior to their threatened boarding. Throughout these dangers, Cyrus takes it upon himself to protect the ship without the humans' knowledge, until he is forced to openly attack and destroy the pirate ship to stop the brigands.

However, after Cyrus recovers from his concussion after ramming the pirate ship, he sees that the Primrose is crippled and decides to tow it to land. The crew and passengers panic at the sight of Cyrus, but the Captain realizes that the monster is genuinely trying to help them and calms everyone down. With the humans accepting this bizarre situation, Cyrus heads non-stop for land at all possible speed until he beaches the ship safely.

With that, Cyrus accepts the humans' gratitude as he departs and decides that he has had enough excitement for some time. With that, Cyrus finds a remote island and peacefully sleeps for a month.

== Adaptations ==
There is a 100-foot sculpture of a sea serpent, inspired by Cyrus, in San Francisco's Golden Gate Park.
