= The Caboose Who Got Loose =

Book by Bill Peet

- Author: Bill Peet
- Language: English
- Subject: Railroad trains—Fiction
- Genre: Children's book
- Publisher: Houghton Mifflin
- Publication date: 9 September 1971
- Publication place: United States
- Pages: 48
- ISBN: 9780395287156
- LC Class: PZ8.3.P2764 Cab 2008

The Caboose Who Got Loose is a children's picture book written and illustrated by Bill Peet, published in 1971 by Houghton Mifflin.

== Plot ==
The Caboose Who Got Loose tells the story of Katy Caboose, a caboose who is tired of being dragged around at the end of the train by the Engine. She dreams of being part of the beautiful sceneries she passes during her trips, but she cannot because she is always on the move. One day, when the engine is pulling the train up a steep mountain grade, the caboose is jolted loose from the train and flies back down the track towards a turn. Upon arriving at the turn, she has too much speed and she flies into the air off the track. Luckily she gets wedged between two trees, and she spends the rest of her days happy living in a beautiful place.

== In other media ==
A paperback edition was published on 22 January 1980 by Sandpiper (an imprint of Houghton Mifflin). A combination paperback and compact disc recording of several readings of the book was released on 18 March 2008 by Houghton Mifflin Harcourt. In a review for The Christian Science Monitor Guernsey Le Pelley wrote that "Bill Peet rides full throttle with a happy story and his beautiful, incredible crayon pictures."
