= The Ant and the Elephant =

Book by Bill Peet

- Front cover, designed by Bill Peet
- Author: Bill Peet
- Illustrator: Bill Peet
- Cover artist: Billiam Peet
- Language: English
- Series: None
- Subject: friendship, helping others
- Genre: children's literature, picture book
- Set in: Jungle
- Publisher: HMH Books for Young Readers
- Publication date: February 19, 1972
- Publication place: USA
- Pages: 48
- ISBN: 0-395-16963-1
- LC Class: 74-179918
- Based on the Aesop Fable: The Dove and the Ant

The Ant and the Elephant is a children's picture book written and illustrated by Bill Peet and was adapted into a family musical for the stage. Published by HMH Books for Young Readers in 1972, it is based on the Aesop Fable entitled The Dove and the Ant.

== Plot ==
An ant is stranded on an island; since he can't swim, the ant asks a turtle for help. The turtle selfishly refuses (because he's already had his swim for the day); shortly thereafter, he falls on his back and can't right himself. So he asks a hornbill for help; she selfishly refuses ("This will teach you not to be so clumsy," she says), and then her egg falls out of its nest. It's too heavy for her to carry, so she asks a giraffe for help, but the giraffe is too proud to assist her. Then the giraffe's legs get hopelessly ensnarled in some vines; he asks a lion for help, but the lion just laughs and strolls on. Then a boulder rolls onto the lion's tail, trapping him. He asks a rhino for help, but when he can't think of any way to return the favor, the rhino strolls on, until he gets his horn embedded in a stump. Then an elephant notices and helps each of the animals in turn, starting with the ant—the only one who bothers to thank the elephant. Shortly after the elephant has assisted everyone, he himself falls into a ravine. When he can't get out, the elephant resigns himself to his plight. Then a horde of ants—led by the one he assisted previously—carries him from the ravine. He, in turn, gives them a ride home on his back.

== Musical ==
The Ant and the Elephant was adapted into an on-stage family musical. The play was adapted by the creators of The Musical Adventures of Flat Stanley.

== Reception ==
Book

A review by Elephanteria Library Books About Elephants includes, "Good illustrations; look like pencil and/or pastel work. Lesson in helping and showing gratitude. Recommended for early readers and younger".

Musical

Texas A&M's MSC Opas said that the play has a catchy score by the Tony Award winning team of The Drowsy Chaperone.
