= Robert Newton Peck =

American author (1928–2020)

- Born: Robert Newton Peck; February 17, 1928; Ticonderoga, New York, U.S.
- Died: June 23, 2020 (aged 92); Longwood, Florida, U.S.
- Occupation: Writer
- Writing career
- Period: 20th century
- Genre: Young adult literature

Robert Newton Peck (February 17, 1928 – June 23, 2020) was an American author who specialized in children's and young adult literature. His works include A Day No Pigs Would Die, Millie's Boy, and the Soup series.

== Early life ==
Robert Newton Peck was reticent to discuss his early life, perhaps because the reality was in a number of respects different from statements he made and from the picture portrayed in his novels. Peck gave his birth date as February 17, 1928, but typically refused to specify where he was born. His place of birth was Ticonderoga, New York, as is recorded in state archives and published in the local newspaper. Peck's parents, Frank Haven Peck, a widower, and Lucile Dornburgh, both of Ticonderoga, were married in 1923 in Glens Falls, New York. At his birth, Peck was named for his two deceased grandfathers, Robert Dornburgh, a prominent attorney, and Newton Peck, who was trained as a medical doctor but later became a clothing merchant. At the time of Peck's birth, the family consisted of Peck, his parents, and two half sisters, Marian and Molly, who were several years older than Robert. (Two older half sisters had married before Robert was born.) By the fall of 1930, however, his mother had filed for a separation, though both parents continued to live in Ticonderoga; a divorce was granted in early 1933. From about the age of two, Peck and his mother lived in the home of her deceased parents, along with her sister, Caroline ("Carrie") Dornburgh. Lucile was the homemaker, and Carrie worked as a business secretary and stenographer. During the early years of the Great Depression, Lucile and Caroline attempted to sell the family home, not a "farm" but a town lot with two adjoining half lots (about a third of an acre). They were apparently unsuccessful, for the property was foreclosed upon by the Ticonderoga National Bank six years later, when Robert was nine, though the family continued on in the home as renters for about four more years. When Peck was about thirteen, he and his mother moved to Glens Falls, New York, for a couple years before returning to Ticonderoga.

Peck indicated that he was born and grew up in Vermont, as in his semi-autobiographical novels. Though Peck and his mother briefly lived in Bennington, Vermont, before he entered the military, the only verified family connection to Vermont comes through his paternal grandparents, who died before Peck was born. The grandfather, Newton Peck, was originally from Cornwall, Vermont, and had moved to Ticonderoga and married there shortly before the 1875 birth of Peck's father. Newton Peck's wife, Mary Haven, had family connections to Shoreham, Vermont, adjacent to Cornwall and directly across Lake Champlain from Ticonderoga. It was not only his grandparents that Peck did not know; he claimed later in life that he had never known his father, who died when Robert was twelve. In contrast to the narrative in the semi-autobiographical A Day No Pigs Would Die, Peck's father was not a pig farmer but had been proprietor of his father's clothing business and during Robert's childhood he was an insurance and real estate agent. Robert's father's home at that time had belonged to Newton Peck, the doctor and merchant, and had previously been the property of Newton Peck's father-in-law, who had been a cooper. As with Peck's mother's family home, his father's was also lost to a bank foreclosure during the Great Depression. Whether there was involvement in Shakerism in Peck's family, as indicated in A Day No Pigs Would Die, is unlikely. There were no Shaker communities in Vermont, nor in Ticonderoga, and Peck has been criticized for his inaccurate depiction of Shaker belief and practice (for example, in reality Shakers were unmarried, held their property communally, and did not keep pets). The obituaries of his parents and grandparents instead indicate family ties to Congregationalism and Methodism.

== Education, military service, and early career ==
Peck attended Weedville School (grades 1–4), and Central School (grades 5–7), both in Ticonderoga. He attended high school at Ticonderoga High School, also in Glens Falls, New York, and in Bennington, Vermont, where he graduated in June 1945. From Bennington, he was accepted for military induction at age 17 following his high school graduation. World War II was then still in progress, but the surrenders of Germany and Japan had both occurred by the time Peck was out of training. Fighting was still taking place, nevertheless, and he served as a private from 1945 to 1947 in the U.S. Army, including time in the 88th Infantry Division and as a machine-gunner in Italy defending the Morgan Line. After his term of duty was completed and he had returned home, Peck took on a variety of jobs. He worked in a saw mill, did farm work, worked in a lumber camp, in a paper pulp mill, and found jobs playing piano. Peck entered Goddard College in Plainfield, Vermont, in the fall of 1948. He spent a year there, including a period of work-study in Albany, New York. The following year, he transferred to Rollins College in Winter Park, Florida, after a football scout, apparently interested in Peck due to his size (6' 4"), urged him to apply for educational funding through the G.I. Bill. At Rollins, in addition to his academics, Peck kept busy with sports, drama, playing piano, and writing. He was known in school for his sense of humor in class and his love of horses. He graduated with a B.A. in English in 1953, and the next fall he entered Cornell Law School. He did not complete his studies, however, due to the lack of financial resources. Following his time at Cornell, Peck tried his hand at several creative endeavors (writing songs and jingles, comedy) until settling into the field of advertising in New York City in 1954. He worked in advertising with Parents Magazine in New York, with Curtis Publishing Company in Cleveland, Ohio, and with American Home Products in New York City, commuting from Darien, Connecticut. He had a record album of satirical music released in 1957, Moth in a Gray Flannel Suit. He left advertising in 1974, following the success of his first novels, and in 1977 Peck and his family moved to Florida where he devoted more time to writing.

== Writing ==
Peck was steered toward writing by one of his mentors at Rollins College, Edwin Granberry, after Granberry read some of Peck's written work. He published his first novel, A Day No Pigs Would Die, in 1972 at the age of 44. The book, which became a best seller, was written while Peck commuted on the train between his home in Connecticut and his job in New York City. He had published a much less well-known book, The Happy Sadist, ten years earlier, a satirical work which he called "a sort of unprofound autobiography". His body of work comprises nearly sixty children's and young adult titles, six nonfiction works, thirty-five songs, three television specials, and over one hundred poems. His Soup series, another semi-autobiographical work, was immensely popular and ran to nearly twenty separate titles and was adapted for television in 1978. In 2005 he published an atypical autobiography, Weeds in Bloom: Autobiography of an Ordinary Man, composed of a series of vignettes of various times, places, and people in his life. Peck also authored three books on the craft of writing as well as giving workshops and occasionally teaching writing both at Rollins and at Manhattanville College. He served as Director of Rollins College Writers Conference, 1977–1982. Peck's novels won numerous awards throughout his career, including the Mark Twain Readers Award in 1981 for Soup for President, and inclusion in the American Library Association's Best Books for Young Adults for A Day No Pigs Would Die in 1973. While A Day No Pigs Would Die is certainly Peck's most famous work, and has been published in over 40 countries, it has also been the target of censorship due to some of its graphic descriptions. Rights to the book, as well as his novel Millie's Boy, were purchased by Twentieth Century Fox for film adaptations, but were never produced.

== Personal life ==
In 1958 Peck married Dorothy Anne Houston, a Columbia University graduate and librarian, and they were the parents of two children: Christopher who was born in 1968, and Anne born in 1971. Christopher died July 31, 2011, at the age of 43. Fred Rogers, a classmate at Rollins College, was an usher at the Peck's wedding and, according to Peck, the godfather to his children. Robert and Dorothy divorced in 1994. His second marriage was to Sharon "Sam" Michael in 1995.

In 1984, Peck was sued by Mary Jo Wardlaw, an Erskine College student, for outrageous conduct causing severe emotional distress and slander, for comments he made during a convocation speech at the college. The day before the speech, Wardlaw had failed to pick up Peck from the airport. Upset at having been made to wait, Peck pointed to Wardlaw during his speech and referred to her as "Mary Jo Warthog" or "Warthog." As the court noted,

He likened her to a fictitious character in his books called "Janice," who he said was the "bully of his childhood." He described "Janice" as "built like a garbage truck" with "fists like cannonballs" and said she walked hunched over with her fists dangling before her so her left arm swung over her left leg and her right arm swung over her right leg. He said Mary Jo Wardlaw was late to the airport because she walked like "Janice." He then mimicked Wardlaw's supposed walk by walking across the stage in front of the convocation audience in an ape-like position.

A South Carolina appeals court upheld a $24,000 jury verdict against Peck on the theory that when Peck cast aspersions upon Wardlaw's chastity, his public remarks were slanderous per se.

In 1993, Peck was diagnosed with cancer of the larynx, but overcame the disease. Peck lived with his wife in Longwood, Florida, and died there in 2020.
