= Alfred Slote =

American writer (1926–2026)

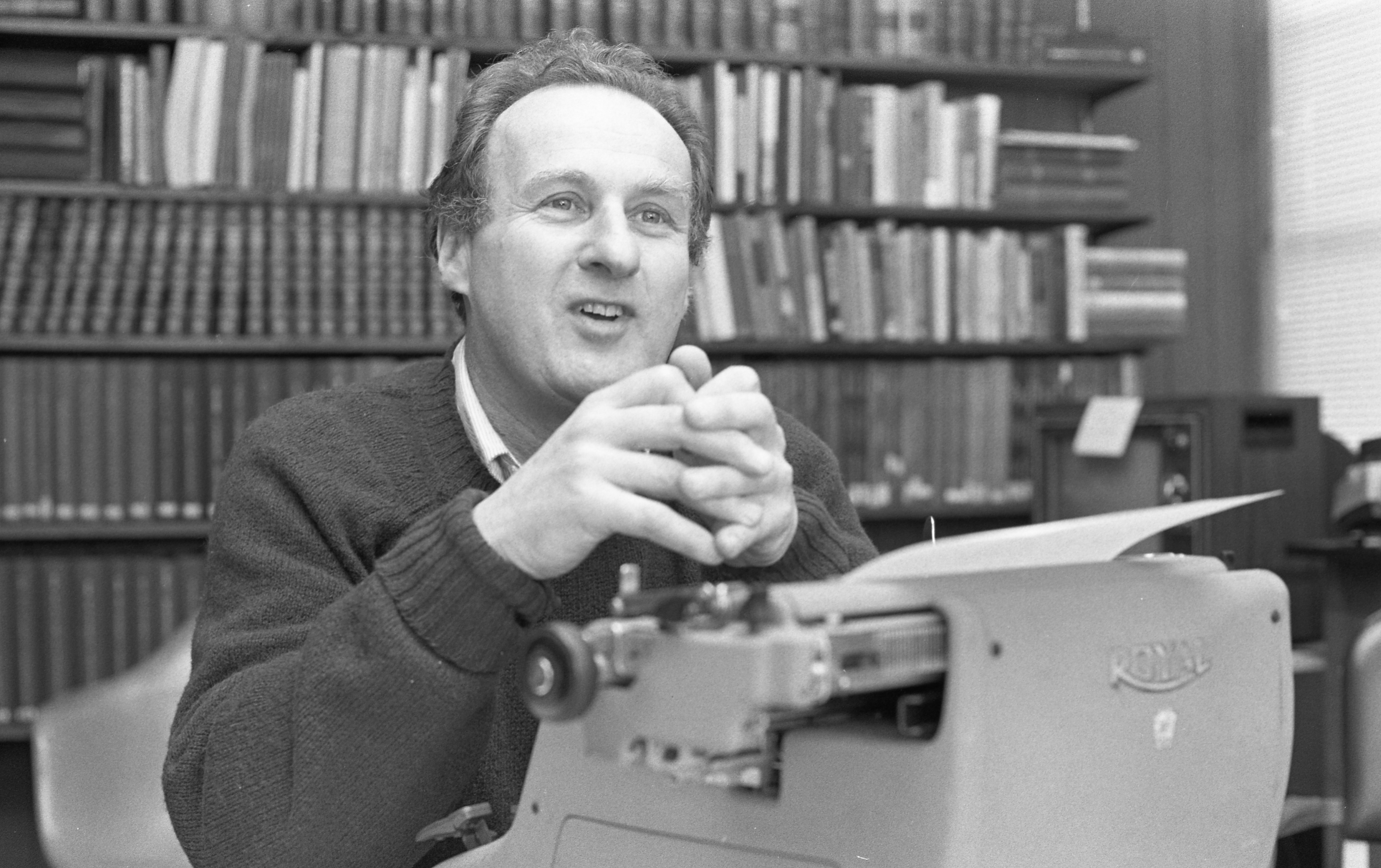
- Slote in 1979
- Born: September 11, 1926; New York City, U.S.
- Died: April 26, 2026 (aged 99)
- Writing career
- Period: 1953–?
- Genre: Children's literature

Alfred Slote (September 11, 1926 – April 26, 2026) was an American children's author known for his numerous sports and space novels. His writing has been described as "making space travel seem as ordinary as piling in the family wagon for a jaunt to McDonald's". Slote's 1991 novel Finding Buck McHenry was adapted into a 2000 television film.

== Life and career ==
Slote was born in Brooklyn, New York City on September 11, 1926. He later resided in Ann Arbor, Michigan. In 2012 Slote and his baseball book Jake were the subject of an ESPN 30 for 30 short documentary in which Slote describes his writing process and reads from the book, saying it is his best writing. Slote died on April 26, 2026, at the age of 99.

== Works ==
- Denham Proper (1953)
- Lazarus in Vienna (1956)
- The Princess Who Wouldn't Talk (1964)
- Strangers and Comrades (1964)
- The Moon in Fact and Fancy (1967)
- Air in Fact and Fancy (1968)
- Termination; the closing at Baker plant (1969)
- Stranger on the Ball Club (1970)
- Jake (1971)
- The Biggest Victory (1972)
- My Father, the Coach (1972)
- Hang Tough, Paul Mather (1973)
- Tony and Me (1974)
- Matt Gargan's Boy (1975)
- The Hotshot (1977)
- My Trip to Alpha I (1978)
- Love and Tenni (1979)
- The Devil Rides With Me and Other Fantastic Stories (1980)
- Clone Catcher (1982)
- Rabbit Ears (1982)
- A Friend Like That (1988)
- Moving In (1988)
- Make-Believe Ball Player (1989)
- The Trading Game (1990)
- Finding Buck McHenry (1991)

=== Robot Buddy series ===
- My Robot Buddy (1975)
- C.O.L.A.R. : a tale of outer space (1981)
- Omega Station (1983)
- The Trouble on Janus (1985)

Slote's four book series shows the life of Jack Jameson and his robot buddy Danny One as they have adventures in a future society that has developed androids that mimic human beings perfectly.
