= People of Paradox =

1972 history book by Michael Kammen

People of Paradox: An Inquiry Concerning the Origins of American Civilization
- Author: Michael Kammen
- Genre: History
- Publisher: Knopf
- Publication date: 1972
- Publication place: United States
- Pages: 736
- Awards: Pulitzer Prize for History
- ISBN: 9780394460772

People of Paradox: An Inquiry Concerning the Origins of American Civilization is a 1972 book by American cultural historian Michael Kammen, published by Knopf. It explores various contradictions in American society, such as puritanism vs. hedonism and idealism vs. materialism. People of Paradox was awarded the Pulitzer Prize for History in 1973.
