= Isabelle Holland =

American author of fiction for children and adults (1920-2022)

Isabelle Christian Holland (June 16, 1920 – February 9, 2002) was an American author of fiction for children and adults. She wrote gothic novels, adult mysteries, romantic thrillers and many books for children and young adults.

== Life and career ==
Holland was born in Basel, Switzerland. Her father was the American Consul in Liverpool, England, during World War II. Due to the war, she moved to the United States in 1940. She attended Tulane University and also was a member of Kappa Alpha Theta. As publicity director for Lippincott, she oversaw the publicity for To Kill a Mockingbird and became a friend of author Harper Lee. She wrote over 50 books and was still working at the time of her death at age 81 in New York City.

Holland's books for children and young adults tackled a variety of difficult and/or controversial topics—death, rape, incest, teen pregnancy, sexual abuse, and homosexuality. Reoccurring themes in her books for adults and children include the ravages of alcoholism on families, and the healing and redemptive power of animals.

Her literary archives are in the de Grummond Children's Literature Collection at the University of Southern Mississippi and the Kerlan Collection of Children's Literature at the University of Minnesota.

Two of her novels have been made into movies:

- Bump in the Night (1991)
- The Man Without a Face (1993)

These novels deal with issues or allegations of pedophilia.

== Works ==
- (1953) "The Fortune Hunter" (fiction). Collier's, Jan 24, pp. 32–39.
- (1967) Cecily (fiction)
- (1970) Amanda's Choice (fiction)
- (1972) The Man Without a Face (fiction)
- (1973) Heads You Win Tails I Lose (fiction)
- (1974) Trelawny (fiction)
- (1975) Of Love and Death and Other Journeys (fiction)
- (1975) Kilgaren (fiction)
- (1975) Moncrieff (fiction)
- (1976) Trelawny's Fell (fiction)
- (1976) Standish Place (fiction)
- (1977) Alan and the Animal Kingdom (fiction)
- (1977) Darcourt (fiction)
- (1977) Hitchhike (fiction)
- (1978) The DeMaury Papers (fiction)
- (1978) Dinah and the Green Fat Kingdom (fiction)
- (1978) Grenelle (fiction)
- (1978) Journey for Three (fiction)
- (1978) Ask No Questions (fiction)
- (1979) Tower Abbey (fiction)
- (1979) The Marchington Inheritance (fiction)
- (1980) Now Is Not Too Late (fiction)
- (1980) Counterpoint (fiction)
- (1981) Counterpart (fiction)
- (1981) Summer of My First Love (fiction)
- (1981) The Lost Madonna (fiction)
- (1982) Abbie's God Book (fiction)
- (1982) A Horse Named Peaceable (fiction)
- (1983) The Empty House (fiction)
- (1983) God, Mrs. Muskrat and Aunt Dot (fiction)
- (1983) Perdita (fiction)
- (1983) After the First Love (fiction)
- (1984) Kevin's Hat (fiction)
- (1984) A Death at St. Anselm's (mystery)
- (1984) Green Andrew Green (fiction)
- (1984) The Island (fiction)
- (1985) Jenny Kiss'd Me (fiction)
- (1986) Henry and Grudge (fiction)
- (1987) Toby the Splendid (fiction)
- (1987) The Christmas Cat (fiction)
- (1987) Love and the Genetic Factor (fiction)
- (1988) Love and Inheritance (fiction)
- (1988) Bump in the Night (fiction)
- (1989) The Easter Donkey (fiction)
- (1989) A Fatal Advent (mystery)
- (1989) The Unfrightened Dark (fiction)
- (1990) The Journey Home (fiction)
- (1990) Thief (fiction)
- (1991) Search (fiction)
- (1991) The House in the Woods (fiction)
- (1994) Behind the Lines (fiction)
- (1995) Family Trust (fiction)
- (1996) The Promised Land (fiction)
- (1999) Paperboy (fiction)
