= Michael Kammen =

American professor of American cultural history (1936–2013)

Michael Gedaliah Kammen (October 25, 1936 – November 29, 2013) was an American professor of American cultural history in the Department of History at Cornell University. At the time of his death, he held the title "Newton C. Farr professor emeritus of American history and culture".

== Education ==
Kammen was born in 1936 in Rochester, New York, grew up in the Washington, D.C., area, and was educated at the George Washington University and Harvard University, where he received his Ph.D. in 1964 after studying under Bernard Bailyn. He began teaching at Cornell upon completion of his graduate studies at Harvard and taught until retiring to emeritus status in 2008. Beginning as a scholar of the colonial period of American history, his interests eventually broadened to include American legal, cultural, and social issues of the 19th and 20th centuries.

== Research ==
One of his first major books, People of Paradox: An Inquiry Concerning the Origins of American Civilization, won the Pulitzer Prize for History in 1973. A later work, A Machine That Would Go of Itself: The Constitution in American Culture (1986), won the Francis Parkman Prize and the Henry Adams Prize. In this work, Kammen describes the American people's evolving conceptions of the U.S. Constitution and of constitutional governance, stressing both mechanical and organic conceptions of constitutional development over time.

Kammen was active in organizations advancing the study of history, and served as president of the Organization of American Historians for the 1995–96 year.

== Personal life ==
Kammen was the father of UC Berkeley professor Daniel Kammen and National University of Singapore professor Douglas Kammen.

== Major works ==
- People of Paradox: An Inquiry Concerning the Origins of American Civilization (1972) ISBN 978-0-394-46077-2
- Colonial New York: A History. Millwood, NJ: K+O Press, 1975. ISBN 0-19-510779-9
- A Season of Youth: The American Revolution and the Historical Imagination (1978) ISBN 978-0-394-49651-1
- The Origins of the American Constitution: A Documentary History. New York: Penguin Books, 1986. ISBN 0-14-008744-3 (edited by Kammen)
- A Machine That Would Go of Itself: The Constitution in American Culture (1986) ISBN 978-1-4128-2776-8
- Mystic Chords of Memory: The Transformation of Tradition in American Culture (1991) ISBN 978-0-394-57769-2
- Contested Values: Democracy and Diversity in American Culture (1995) ISBN 978-0-312-09085-2
- In The Past Lane: Historical Perspectives on American Culture (1997) ISBN 978-0-195-11111-8
- American Culture, American Tastes: Social Change and the 20th Century (1999) ISBN 978-0-679-42740-7
- A Time to Every Purpose: The Four Seasons in American Culture (2004) ISBN 978-0-8078-2836-6
- Digging Up the Dead: A History of Notable American Reburials (2010) ISBN 978-0-226-42329-6
