= Bill Peet =

American illustrator and animator (1915–2002)

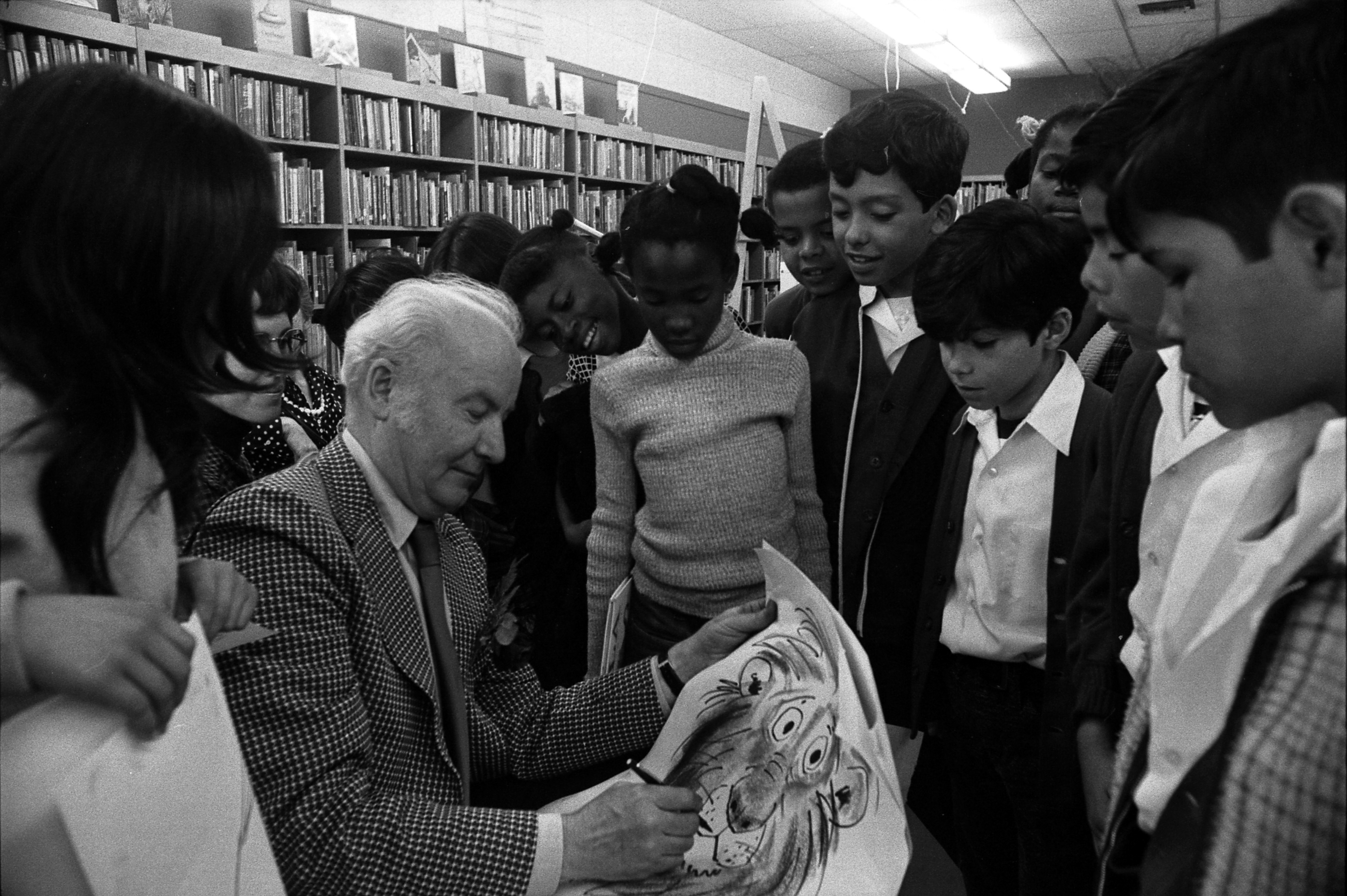
- Peet autographing a drawing of Hubert the Lion in 1974
- Born: William Bartlett Peet; January 29, 1915; Grandview, Indiana, U.S.
- Died: May 11, 2002 (aged 87); Studio City, California, U.S.
- Resting place: Forest Lawn Memorial Park, Hollywood Hills, California, U.S.
- Education: Herron School of Art and Design
- Occupations: Screenwriter; illustrator; artist; storyboard artist
- Years active: 1937–1990
- Employer: Walt Disney Productions (1937–1964)
- Spouse: Margaret Brunst (m. 1937)
- Children: 2

William Bartlett Peet (né Peed; January 29, 1915 – May 11, 2002) was an American children's book illustrator and a story writer and animator for Walt Disney Animation Studios.

Peet joined Disney in 1937 and worked first on Snow White and the Seven Dwarfs (1937) near the end of its production. Progressively, his involvement in the Disney studio's animated feature films and shorts increased, and he remained there until early in the development of The Jungle Book (1967). A row with Walt Disney over the direction of the project led to him resigning in 1964.

Peet's subsequent career was as a writer and illustrator of numerous children's books, including Capyboppy (1966), The Wump World (1970), The Whingdingdilly (1970), The Ant and the Elephant (1972), and Cyrus the Unsinkable Serpent (1975).

== Early life ==
Bill Peet was born in Grandview, Indiana, on January 29, 1915, the son of Orion Hopkins Peed (1888–1951) and EmmaGrayce Peed (née Thorpe, 1891–1969). He developed a love of drawing at an early age and filled tablets with sketches.

According to his autobiography, Peet's happiest childhood times were the years following World War I—years during which his father abandoned the family. During that period Peet lived with his mother and brothers on the outskirts of Indianapolis, in a household run by his maternal grandmother.

Animals were always a love of Peet's. He and his friends traipsed through the woods looking for frogs, tadpoles, and minnows. Most of his adventures as a boy to catch animals were in the hope that he could capture them and sketch them. These years laid the groundwork for two primary themes repeated in his books: unkindness in the animal kingdom and the grim costs of human progress. "It has always been difficult for me to accept nature's cruel ways of keeping a balance among the animals - all the savagery and suffering," he wrote about the frogs and snakes he chased in his local creek. "Yet nature's merciless ways were never more cruel than the slow, silent death caused by the poisonous waste spilling from pipes down into the creek... where dead fish floated belly up and a nauseating stench filled the air."

Often, instead of doing lessons, Peet drew in the margins of his textbooks, which were very popular for their added illustrations when he sold them back.

The young Peet also sneaked into greeting parties at the train station, just for the chance to see the train's mechanical workings close-up. As a teen, he tried to sketch the circus big top, but he was always in the way of the set-up crew. He memorized the scene and later reconstructed it from memory.

After ten years of absence, Peet's father returned to the household and, according to Peet, brought with him conflict and strife - demanding that Peet's mother provide money to underwrite a string of failed ventures as a traveling salesman. This chapter culminated in the death of Peet's grandmother, which Peet implied was in part caused by the stress and misery his father caused. The home where the family lived was sold, and Peet's blissful young years ended.

It was about this time Peet entered into Arsenal Technical High School. At first, he had little interest in pursuing a career as an artist. However, after failing all his classes but physical education, he followed the advice of a friend and took some art classes. Peet did extremely well and experimented with a broad range of media. He eventually received a scholarship to the John Herron Art Institute in Indianapolis, which he attended for three years. In the first class, Bill found himself very interested in a girl who sat in the front row. That girl, Margaret Brunst, became his wife in 1937.

Peet took quite a few painting classes that first year, and he admitted his paintings were always somewhat macabre. "I seemed to be attracted to the gloomy side of things, or the sordid," he wrote. "No vases of flowers or water lilies for me." His favorite subjects were grizzled old men, “perfected with age, like a gnarled oak tree.” Another favorite subject was the circus—but always the assembly of the tent cities, never the show itself.

== Disney ==
Following college, Peet sent off some of his cartoon action sketches after hearing that the Disney Studio was hiring artists for their animated films. He was subsequently asked to come to try-outs. He trekked across the country to Los Angeles and participated in a one-month audition process; only three of fifteen survived the tryouts, and they were rewarded with work as "in-betweeners" (making up the frames between the key drawings) on the Donald Duck shorts. He found the work somewhat tedious. It was at this time Disney was working on Snow White and the Seven Dwarfs, which Hollywood skeptics predicted would be a failure. After Snow White had become a triumphant success, Peet sent character sketches for Pinocchio to Disney's production team. Before the verdict on his designs had come back, Peet felt like he'd had enough, and he went screaming out of the studio, “No more ducks!” Fortuitously, he came back the next day to pick up his jacket and found an envelope, informing him he had been promoted to the story department, where he went on to contribute to films including Fantasia, The Three Caballeros, Song of the South, Cinderella, Alice in Wonderland, Peter Pan, Sleeping Beauty, and The Jungle Book.

Peet then officially began working as a sketch artist, putting the words of a story man into pictures on the film. Peet's first encounter with Walt Disney directly was at this time, when Disney reviewed the storyboards Peet had put together. Even though both his boards were eventually cut from the film, Peet continued to work on Pinocchio for another year and a half. After that period, Peet worked on Fantasia and Dumbo. When World War II broke out, Disney halted normal production and contributed to the war effort making propaganda films. Peet helped here as well but received his big break after the war was over. His work was so impressive to Walt that he made him a fully fledged story man who also handled the sketching end of character design. He was also the sole developer of the animated features One Hundred and One Dalmatians and The Sword in the Stone, the only artist to have created all of the storyboards for a Disney animated movie.

As Peet began to consider a backup profession in the 1950s, he decided to continue working at Disney where he developed a few short cartoons and worked on the feature films of the period. At this point, he was working very closely with Walt Disney; Peet respected Disney's creative genius but found him to be a sometimes difficult man. A large part of his autobiography is dedicated to his dealings with Disney over the years. Peet described the Disney studio as a "brutal" place, rife with rivalries and jealousy.

Although Walt Disney himself had not animated on his films since the earliest days of the studio, and by the 1950s was less present on a day-to-day basis when it came to the planning of the animated films, he still remained in charge of the major decisions on the artistic side. He reviewed all the work and gave it the final go-ahead. As they were both strong-willed and passionately creative men, Peet and Disney quarreled frequently about parts in the films such as the dancing/romance scene in Sleeping Beauty. Peet quit working with Disney and left the company on January 29, 1964, which was his 49th birthday, following an especially heated argument with Walt concerning the relative tone and direction of The Jungle Book which included Walt insulting Peet stating he should see Mary Poppins for "real entertainment". Peet would later admit in his autobiography that he was glad he didn't insult back at Disney over the film and left the studio when he did knowing that Disney would die over two years after he left.

== Children's books ==
While he was still working at Disney, Peet realized by 1950 that he wouldn't stay at the studio forever and began to consider a backup profession which included returning to painting as well as trying to make editorial cartoons for magazines. However, he abandoned both as he felt he had "lost touch with the brush" due to the ever-changing art landscape and his editorial cartoons were rejected by several publications. He then turned his attention to writing and illustrating children's books which he had considered doing as a career when he was a kid. Peet developed many of his ideas from bedtime stories he had told his children and he wrote and illustrated several books while still at Disney with his first book, Hubert’s Hair-Raising Adventure, being published in 1959, although some of his stories he had planned were turned into shorts at the studio. After leaving the studio in 1964, Peet turned his full attention to writing children's books. Much of the success Peet's stories have enjoyed is due to the memorable themes they contain: trying when there's not much obvious hope, not allowing taunting of others to prevent individual success, finding compromise in solutions and others. Unlike most other children's authors, Peet did not dumb down the vocabulary of his stories but included enough context to make the meaning of difficult words obvious. All of his books published by Houghton Mifflin Company remain actively in print.

== Death and legacy ==
Peet died on May 11, 2002, at the age of 87. His interment was at Forest Lawn Memorial Park (Hollywood Hills).

In 2015, Walt Disney Animation Studios produced a cartoon short for the 101 Dalmatians Diamond Edition Blu-ray release entitled The Further Adventures of Thunderbolt as a bonus feature, based on Peet's early drafts of the "Thunderbolt the Wonder Dog" sequence which follows the events after Thunderbolt and Dirty Dawson start fighting in the river.

Justin Marks, who wrote the screenplay for Disney's 2016 live-action Jungle Book film directed by Jon Favreau, had commented that he plans to incorporate elements from Peet's rejected screenplay of the original animated classic into the former film's upcoming sequel:

In the second film, the idea is to go further through the Kipling but also go into some of the Disney resources from the ’67 film that maybe didn’t get to see the light of day in the first film. If you look back to Bill Peet’s work on the original film, some of which was thrown out by Walt Disney, Jon [Favreau] and I really dove deep into the Disney archives to see some of the ideas. We were like, ‘Wait, that’s a great idea. We really need that in the film.’ So we’ve built it out like that.”

— Justin Marks

== Filmography ==
- Pinocchio (1940) (story adaptation) (uncredited)
- Fantasia (1940) (story development) (The Pastoral Symphony segment)
- Dumbo (1941) (story development)
- How to Play Football (1944) (story) (uncredited)
- The Three Caballeros (1944) (story) (as Bill Peed)
- Tiger Trouble (1945) (story) (as Bill Peed)
- African Diary (1945) (story) (as Bill Peed)
- Californy'er Bust (1945) (story) (as Bill Peed)
- A Knight for a Day (1946) (story) (as Bill Peed)
- Song of the South (1946) (cartoon story, animation planner) (as William Peed)
- So Dear to My Heart (1948) (cartoon story treatment) (as William Peed)
- Cinderella (1950) (story) (as William Peed)
- Wonder Dog (1950) (story) (as Bill Peed)
- Alice in Wonderland (1951) (story)
- Lambert the Sheepish Lion (1952) (story)
- Susie the Little Blue Coupe (1952) (original story, story adaptation)
- The Little House (1952) (story adaptation)
- Peter Pan (1953) (story)
- Ben and Me (1953) (story)
- The Wonderful World of Disney (1954–1970, fourteen episodes) (writer, story, cartoon story treatment)
- The Truth About Mother Goose (1957) (story, lyricist)
- Sleeping Beauty (1959) (additional story)
- Goliath II (1960) (story)
- One Hundred and One Dalmatians (1961) (story, character stylist)
- The Sword in the Stone (1963) (story, character design)
- The Jungle Book (1967) (early story treatment) (uncredited)

== Bibliography ==
- Peet, Bill (1989). Bill Peet: An Autobiography. Houghton Mifflin. ISBN 9780395509326. A Caldecott Honor Book and ALA Honor Book.

=== Fiction ===
- Hubert's Hair-Raising Adventure (1959)
- Goliath II (1959)
- Huge Harold (1961)
- Smokey (1962)
- The Pinkish, Purplish, Bluish Egg (1963)
- Ella (1964)
- Randy's Dandy Lions (1964)
- Chester the Worldly Pig (1965)
- Kermit the Hermit (1965)
- Capyboppy (1966)
- Farewell to Shady Glade (1966)
- Jennifer and Josephine (1967)
- Buford the Little Bighorn (1967)
- Fly Homer Fly (1969)
- The Wump World (1970)
- The Whingdingdilly (1970)
- How Droofus the Dragon Lost His Head (1971)
- The Caboose Who Got Loose (1971)
- The Ant and the Elephant (1972)
- Countdown to Christmas (1972)
- The Spooky Tail of Prewitt Peacock (1973)
- Merle the High Flying Squirrel (1974)
- Cyrus the Unsinkable Sea Serpent (1975)
- The Gnats of Knotty Pine (1975)
- Big Bad Bruce (1977)
- Eli (1978)
- Cowardly Clyde (1979)
- Encore for Eleanor (1981)
- The Luckiest One of All (1982)
- No Such Things (1983)
- Pamela Camel (1984)
- The Kweeks of Kookatumdee (1985)
- Zella, Zack, and Zodiac (1986)
- Jethro and Joel Were a Troll (1987)
- Cock-a-Doodle Dudley (1990)

=== Other work ===
- Rhymes of the Ozark Hills by Harry Lyons Riggle (illustrations only) (1944)
- So Dear to My Heart by Golden Books (illustrations only) (1948)
- Road Engines and Rails - articles written and illustrated for Walt Disney's Mickey Mouse Club Magazine (1957)
