= Models of Teaching =

1972 book

- Title page for Models of Teaching (1980, 2nd edition)
- Author: Bruce Joyce; Marsha Weil
- Language: English
- Subject: Pedagogy
- Genre: Non-fiction
- Publication date: 1972

Models of Teaching is a book by Bruce Joyce and Marsha Weil about the use of group learning, role playing, synectics and other teaching techniques. First published in 1972, the book is in its ninth edition as of 2018. Since the sixth edition in 2000, Emily Calhoun has also been listed as a contributing author.
