= The Man Without a Face =

1993 film starring and directed by Mel Gibson

- Theatrical release poster
- Directed by: Mel Gibson
- Screenplay by: Malcolm MacRury
- Based on: The Man Without a Face by Isabelle Holland
- Produced by: Bruce Davey
- Starring: Mel Gibson; Margaret Whitton; Fay Masterson; Gaby Hoffmann; Geoffrey Lewis; Richard Masur; Nick Stahl
- Cinematography: Donald McAlpine
- Edited by: Tony Gibbs
- Music by: James Horner
- Production company: Icon Productions
- Distributed by: Warner Bros.
- Release date: August 25, 1993
- Running time: 114 minutes
- Country: United States
- Language: English
- Budget: $20 million
- Box office: $37 million

The Man Without a Face is a 1993 American drama film starring and directed by Mel Gibson, in his feature film directorial debut. The film is based on Isabelle Holland's 1972 novel of the same name. The Man Without a Face was released by Warner Bros. on August 25, 1993. The film received positive reviews from most critics, with praise going to Gibson's direction, and grossed $37 million against a $20 million budget.

== Plot ==
In 1968, Justin McLeod has been living an isolated existence as a painter for seven years, after a car accident that disfigured his face.

Chuck Norstadt is a young boy who endures a contentious relationship with his academically brilliant sisters and their mother. One day, Chuck meets McLeod on a ferry when McLeod witnesses Chuck in an act of vandalism. Chuck needs a tutor to help him pass a military academy's entrance exam that he had failed earlier. Upon discovering that McLeod is a teacher, Chuck persuades him to become his tutor. While he is initially baffled by McLeod's unorthodox methods, the two eventually develop a close friendship.

Chuck keeps his daily meetings with McLeod a secret to avoid being scorned for associating with a disfigured man whose past is shrouded in mystery. Ultimately, Mrs. Norstadt learns that her son has been visiting McLeod. She and the rest of the town convince themselves that McLeod is sexually molesting Chuck, despite Chuck's denials. Chuck researches McLeod's car accident, which involved the death of another boy, thus causing McLeod's fear of another attachment.

Chuck confronts McLeod and learns that the youth who was killed in the car crash was his student. Consequently, McLeod was unjustly branded a pedophile, was convicted of involuntary manslaughter, and served three years in prison. Once his relationship with Chuck is openly known, McLeod is run out of town and ordered by the authorities not to have any contact with Chuck, who enters the military academy.

At mail call, he is given back the letters he had sent to McLeod, which were marked undeliverable. Chuck returns to McLeod's house only to find it empty except for a painting he had done of Chuck that summer and a letter explaining that McLeod has moved on. He wishes the best for Chuck in his academic goals, also thanking him for the gift of grace he'd been given. Afterwards, Chuck is shown graduating from the military academy as his family looks on. He sees a familiar figure in the distance and recognizes it as his "faceless" tutor. They silently greet each other.

== Cast ==
- Mel Gibson as Justin McLeod
- Nick Stahl as Charles E. "Chuck" Norstadt
- Robert DeDiemar Jr as Charles E. "Chuck" Norstadt (older)
- Margaret Whitton as Catherine Palin
- Fay Masterson as Gloria Norstadt
- Gaby Hoffmann as Megan Norstadt
- Geoffrey Lewis as Chief Wayne Stark
- Richard Masur as Prof. Carl Hartley
- Michael DeLuise as Douglas Hall, Gloria's boyfriend
- Ethan Phillips as Todd Lansing
- George Martin as Sam the Barber
- Zach Grenier as Dr. Lionel Talbot, Psychiatrist
- Jean De Baer as Mrs. Lansing
- Jack De Mave as Mr. Cooper
- Viva as Mrs. Cooper
- Justin Kanew as Rob Lansing

== Release ==
The Man Without a Face was released on August 25, 1993, in 865 theatres. It ranked fourth at the US box office, making $4.0 million in its opening weekend. In its second weekend, it opened in 1,065 theatres, grossed $5.4 million and ranked second. After five weeks in theatres, the film went on to gross $24.7 million. Internationally, it grossed $11.9 million for a worldwide total of $36.6 million.

== Reception ==
=== Critical response ===
The Man Without a Face holds a 68% rating on Rotten Tomatoes based on 25 reviews with an average rating of 5.9/10. On Metacritic, the film holds a weighted average score of 62 out of 100, based on 20 critics, indicating "generally favorable reviews". Audiences polled by CinemaScore gave the film an average grade of "A" on an A+ to F scale.

Critic Roger Ebert gave the film three out of four stars. He praised Gibson's performance, calling it "a reminder of his versatility; not many actors can fit comfortably in both Lethal Weapon and Hamlet (1990), and here he finds just the right note for McLeod: Not a caricature, not a softy, not pathetic, but fiercely sure of what is right and wrong". He also commended Nick Stahl on his portrayal of Chuck, writing "he doesn't believe that his face has to mirror every emotion; he takes a no-nonsense approach to the material that's fresh and interesting."

Marjorie Baumgarten of The Austin Chronicle was more critical, writing "Perhaps more accurately titled The Man with Half a Face, you can practically tell what kind of emotion each particular scene is going to convey solely by the angle from which Gibson's face is shot." She criticized the film's continuity gaps and said, "There's not all that much that keeps this story moving, and the set-ups are all obvious and predictable."

David Ansen of Newsweek wrote "The Man Without a Face is such a noble, well-intentioned little film... that one feels like an ogre picking on it. Alternately poky and melodramatic—and occasionally witty and insightful—Malcolm MacRury's uneven screenplay too often strains credibility."

== Treatment of sexuality ==
The film's treatment of sexuality between Justin McLeod and Chuck Norstadt differs from the book by Isabelle Holland. In the original novel, McLeod behaves in a way that could be interpreted as child grooming, taking Chuck swimming and behaving affectionately toward him. Chuck, meanwhile, seems to be attracted to McLeod as more than just a father figure. There is one scene where it is strongly implied that Chuck and McLeod have some kind of sexual experience in his bedroom. In the film, McLeod demonstrates no sexual interest in the boy at all, even though Chuck appears downstairs in his underwear when the police officer calls.

Gibson has expressed dislike for the book because of its implied sexual contact between McLeod and Chuck: "I read the script first and that's what I liked. The book is just – I'm sorry, but the guy did it. And you know, like, why? I just wanted to say something a lot more positive."

== Urban legend ==
Around the time of the release of Gibson's 2000 film The Patriot, and again around the time of the release of his 2004 film The Passion of the Christ, an Internet rumor falsely attributed to radio commentator Paul Harvey claimed this film was based on an actual incident that happened to Gibson as a young man. The rumor proved to be false.
