= A Day No Pigs Would Die =

1972 book by Robert Newton Peck

- Cover to paperback edition
- Author: Robert Newton Peck
- Language: English
- Publisher: Alfred A. Knopf
- Publication date: 1972
- Publication place: United States
- Media type: Print (hardback & paperback)
- ISBN: 0-394-48235-2
- OCLC: 328920

A Day No Pigs Would Die is a semi-autobiographical novel by Robert Newton Peck about Rob Peck, a boy coming of age in rural Vermont on an impoverished farm. Originally published in 1972, it is one of the first books to be categorized as young adult fiction, in addition to being Peck's first novel; the sequel, A Part of the Sky, was published in 1994.

== Background ==
Robert Newton Peck was born on February 17, 1928, in Ticonderoga, New York, to Frank Haven Peck and Lucile Dornburgh Peck, who may have had an interest in the tenets of Shakerism. He served as a machine-gunner in the 88th Infantry Division during World War II, and then upon returning home in 1947 enrolled in Rollins College. After graduating in 1953, Peck began taking courses at Cornell Law School, but never finished. He pursued multiple careers during his adult life, including working as a lumberjack, in a paper mill, and he even killed hogs. Eventually, Peck began working as an advertising scriptwriter for American Home Products.

Peck had long believed that "the brutal truths of farm life survival are quite beautiful", and had wanted to write about them since he was eleven. It took him thirty-three years to do so. Peck starting publishing young-adult novels at the age of forty-four, using the time he spent commuting to and from New York City – ten hours a week – to write; working this way, he produced the manuscripts for five young-adult novels in just three years. A Day No Pigs Would Die was written over the course of three weeks and became Peck's first published work.

== Plot summary ==
The story is set during the presidency of Calvin Coolidge, in the years leading up to the Great Depression. The Peck family, parents Haven and Lucy and son Robert Newton (Rob), whose sisters have grown up and married, own and run a small farm in rural Vermont. The family grows apples, hunt game, raise and slaughter animals, and sell what they can.

The story opens with Rob playing truant from school to wander the countryside. He comes across a neighbor’s cow, Apron, which is struggling to give birth to a calf. Rob throws himself into helping the animal, delivering the calf. He saves both Apron and her calf, but the cow reacts violently and Robert is left injured and exhausted.

The cow’s owner, Mr. Tanner, is grateful, and rewards Rob with a young piglet, which Rob names Pinky. Pinky is not just a farm animal, but a beloved, intelligent companion and pet. Rob dreams of Pinky becoming a brood sow so he can sell her piglets and raise his family from poverty.

Rob’s father, Haven Peck, is a hardworking Shaker farmer and butcher. He is stern, quiet and deeply religious, with little room for frivolity. Like all the adults in the family Haven is illiterate. He wants Rob to grow into a responsible man who can provide for his family and continue their way of life, but he also wants Rob to better himself, to "read and write and cipher."

As Pinky grows, she turns out to be infertile. This discovery is heartbreaking, because it means she is of no use to the family’s survival. That year is particularly difficult, with the apple crop failing.

Come Winter, the family is faced with such hardship Pinky is slaughtered. Rob is heartbroken, but understands his father is as well.

Haven dies in his sleep the following May. Rob himself digs the grave in the family plot in the orchard, and at the funeral his neighbors introduce themselves with their first names, recognizing that Rob, at thirteen years of age, is now head of the household. The novel closes with Robert having assumed responsibility for all the duties of the farm.

== Main characters ==
- Robert Peck (Rob): The sheltered twelve-year-old narrator who learns to be a man from his farmer father and his best friend, his pet pig Pinky.
- Haven Peck: Rob's faux-Shaker father; a poor, illiterate farmer who wants to provide for his family and teach his son how to grow up right.
- Pinky: A piglet given to Rob in thanks for his helping Mr. Tanner's cow through a difficult birth.
- Lucy Peck: Rob's caring, resilient mother who fears that her son is growing up too quickly.
- Aunt Carrie: Lucy's older sister who lives with the Pecks and serves as a second mother to Rob.
- Benjamin Tanner: A Baptist farmer who is a neighbor and friend to the Peck family.
- Martha "Matty" Plover: a family friend and retired English teacher

== Themes ==
A Day No Pigs Would Die, like many of Peck's books, draws from his childhood experiences, dealing with the increasing maturity of children growing up in country settings in the early part of the twentieth century. The Peck family and their neighbors all farm and engage in animal husbandry, including butchering and preparing their own meat, and Rob's life is strongly limited by the isolation of his environment. An unexpected trip to the city of Rutland and how different it is from the world that Rob is used to is the central focus of chapters ten and eleven of the novel.

The Peck family, living during Calvin Coolidge's presidency shortly before the beginning of the Great Depression, is poor, and it is their poverty that necessitates one of the tragedies of the book. Winter is unusually cold, the Pecks' apple orchard has produced a poor crop, and game is in short supply. Needing food and not having the money to care for a barren animal, Rob and Haven have to kill Pinky.

The adults in the Peck family are illiterate, and Haven tells Rob that this inability has kept him from voting. Rob does well in school, however, and his family is supportive of his education, allowing a relative to tutor him when his English grades are low. When Rob exclaims that he wants to be just like his father, Haven responds, "No boy, you won't. You'll have your schooling. You'll read and write and cipher."

Religion also plays a large part in this work. Rob and his family call themselves Shakers, although they appear to be only selectively following the tenets of this religion. Peck describes "Shakers who marry, live in nuclear families, read a Shaker 'bible,' and attend a Shaker church." Shakers, however, do not form into traditional family units, have a distinct scriptural text, or procreate. Rob also tells Pinky about the ability of his Shaker namesake to commit acts of violence, which diverges from the Shaker commitment to pacifism, and Haven Peck places importance on earning the wealth to buy his farm, while Shakers were not permitted to own personal property.

At first, Rob has a negative opinion of people who are not practicing Shakers, actually believing that being a Baptist would be worse than going to hell. He eventually questions and overcomes this prejudice as he learns that the Tanners, who are good neighbors and trusted friends to the Pecks, are actually Baptists.

A Day No Pigs Would Die has been noted for not withdrawing from the harsh realities of birth and death, despite being written for youth. From the first chapter, "readers begin to understand the value of life, the ever-present possibility of death, and the need for self-reliance". The book opens with Rob helping a cow through a bloody, difficult birth. He later has Pinky bred for the first time, in a graphic scene, and must then help his father butcher Pinky, after she proves to be barren and too costly for the family to keep if she cannot bear piglets for them to sell. And, in the closing chapters of the text, Haven Peck comes down with "an affection", sickens and dies, leaving Rob to arrange his funeral and then deal with the fact that, now thirteen, he must be considered a man for the sake of his family's continued welfare.

== Reception ==
A Day No Pigs Would Die grossed $300,000 in its first four months in stores, drawing the attention of Twentieth Century Fox, who approached Peck about creating a film adaptation of the novel.

It has received the Colorado Children's Book Award (1972) and has been named to several best books lists, including the ALA Best Books for Young Adults (1973), the Library of Congress Children's Books of the Year (1973), and the School Library Journal Best Books of the Year (1973). In 2005, it made the list of the top 1000 titles owned by Online Computer Library Center members, a list of "the intellectual works that have been judged to be worth owning by the 'purchase vote' of libraries around the globe".

In a nationwide survey of English teachers and librarians conducted in 1976, A Day No Pigs Would Die, was one of only four books (Cormier's The Chocolate War, Zindel's The Pigman, and Hinton's The Outsiders were the other three) that was recommended more than four times.

The Cleveland Plain Dealer said that A Day No Pigs Would Die is "a fantastic adventure, told simply and graphically, with echoes somehow of Mark Twain and of Stephen Vincent Benet". The New York Times claimed that "you'll find yourself caught up in the novel's emotion from the very opening scene which will grab you and not let you go...love suffuses every pages" and likened it stylistically to True Grit and Addie Pray. The Boston Globe deemed it "honest, moving, homely in the warm and simple sense of the word," and Jerry Weiss and James Alexander have agreed, calling it, respectively, "homespun culture at its finest" and "a bucolic gentle book". The School Library Journal said it shows "plenty of Yankee common sense and dry wit, and some pathos... [it is] for boys of this age and for the young of any age". And Newsweek declared that "reading this book is like sipping hot cider in front of a crackling potbellied stove. Every page is suffused with wit and charm and glowing with warmth."

A Day No Pigs Would Die is an early book in the development of the adolescent literature genre. It was written during the second generation of young adult literature, so it was able to avoid what young adult novelist Richard Peck (no relation to Robert) described as "an annoying pioneer period that coincided with the late 1960s in which a great many books were pretty cheap propaganda", that disappeared rapidly with the demise of the youth culture of the 1960s. Peck's novel is still being used in classrooms today, over fifty years after its initial publication, because it combines aspects of literary form considered suitable for adult consumption with a sophisticated subject matter, making it a high level book that is easily approachable for lower level readers.

== Censorship ==
A Day No Pigs Would Die has been a frequent target for censorship, coming in as 16th on the American Library Association's list of the books that were most often challenged in the 1990s.

It has largely been censored because it has content that has been seen as sexually explicit and graphically violent, with specific complaint given to a pig breeding scene, which has been likened to a rape. Pinky "resists the male's advances—at one point sinking her teeth into his ear in protest. 'All part of courting,' says the sow's owner. 'Samson just got his face slapped. That's all.' In the scene that follows, the boar violently overpowers the sow and after being bruised, battered, and bloodied, she can't stop whining." However, the graphic nature of this scene may be meaningful particularly because it is explicit. MIT lecturer in Comparative Media Studies Amy Carleton notes that it gave her a means by which to have a conversation about consent with her child.

Parents have objected to the book's "graphic and gory descriptions" of animals being bred, born, and dying, as well as to its including such "shocking content" as an unmarried couple cohabiting. Another complainant maintained that Peck was "trying to depict Shaker life but... really showing a perverted lifestyle as their norm." Others have protested that A Day No Pigs Would Die "appeals to the erotic and at times prurient mentality", and features "scenes of brutality". The book has also been targeted because it uses "objectionable" language, such as the words "damn" and "bitch".

There has also been some concern that A Day No Pigs Would Die would have a negative influence on adolescent male readers, conditioning boys to view "violence and killing as a part of their initiation into the adult world". A Day No Pigs Would Die has been seen as a particularly vicious example of the young-adult novel stereotype that boys become men only after committing an act of violence against an animal or another part of the natural world. Rob, after helping his father slaughter Pinky, is told that he now knows what it is to be a man, enforcing the idea that boys must pass into the "cult of the kill" in order to mature.

== Sequel ==
Peck published a sequel, A Part of the Sky, in 1994. It picks up where A Day No Pigs Would Die leaves off, following Rob's decision to leave school in order to find employment so that he can pay for the farm and care for his mother and aunt, despite being only thirteen.

A Part of the Sky was not as well received as its predecessor; the New York Times said that it "has the disconcerting effect of making us wonder whether we were wrong about the first book. Was it really so lugubrious and uplifting? Dare we go back? Don't worry. From the first page, A Day No Pigs Would Die pulls readers into its world and holds us fast with a combination of harsh realism, tenderness and laughter that sweeps to the heartbreaking ending."
