= The Flesh in the Furnace =

1972 novel by Dean Koontz

- First edition
- Author: Dean Koontz
- Cover artist: Fred Pfeiffer
- Language: English
- Genre: Horror novel
- Publisher: Bantam Books
- Publication date: 1972
- Publication place: United States
- Media type: Print (hardback & paperback)

The Flesh in the Furnace is a 1972 horror novel by Dean Koontz.

== Plot summary ==
A puppet master has his hands full when his puppets - living puppets - convince his half-witted assistant to kill him and set them free. When freed from the puppet master, who they had once thought of as cruel and thoughtless, they find themselves in what may be an even worse situation. The half-witted assistant now has their lives in his hands, and they are not so competent hands after all. They strive to free themselves once again, and find that their perfect life they'd thought they had created has turned against them.
