= The Man Without a Face (novel) =

1972 book

- Author: Isabelle Holland
- Language: English
- Publisher: J. B. Lippincott
- Publication date: 1972
- Publication place: United States

The Man Without a Face is a novel by Isabelle Holland, published in 1972 by J. B. Lippincott. It was adapted by Mel Gibson into a 1993 movie of the same name.
