= Go-Between =

A go-between is an intermediary.

(The) Go-Between may refer to:

- The Go-Between, a 1953 novel by L.P. Hartley
- The Go-Between (1971 film), the 1971 film adaptation of L.P. Harley's novel by Harold Pinter
- The Go-Between (2015 film), the 2015 BBC adaptation of L.P. Harley's novel
- The Go Between Bridge, a bridge in Brisbane, Australia
- The Go-Betweens, an indie rock band from Australia
