= Cotillion =

Type of social dance

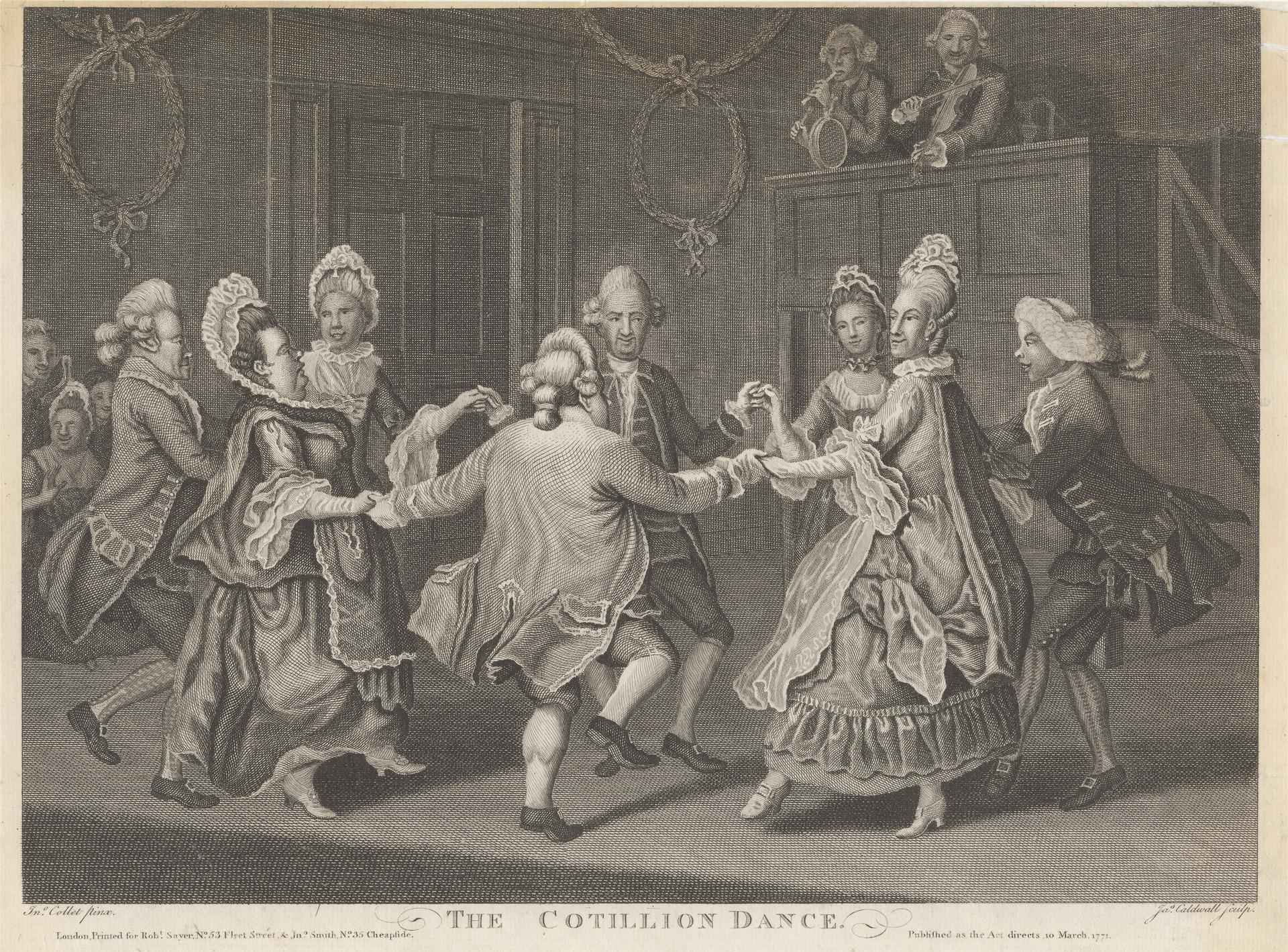
The Cotillion Dance by James Caldwall (1771)

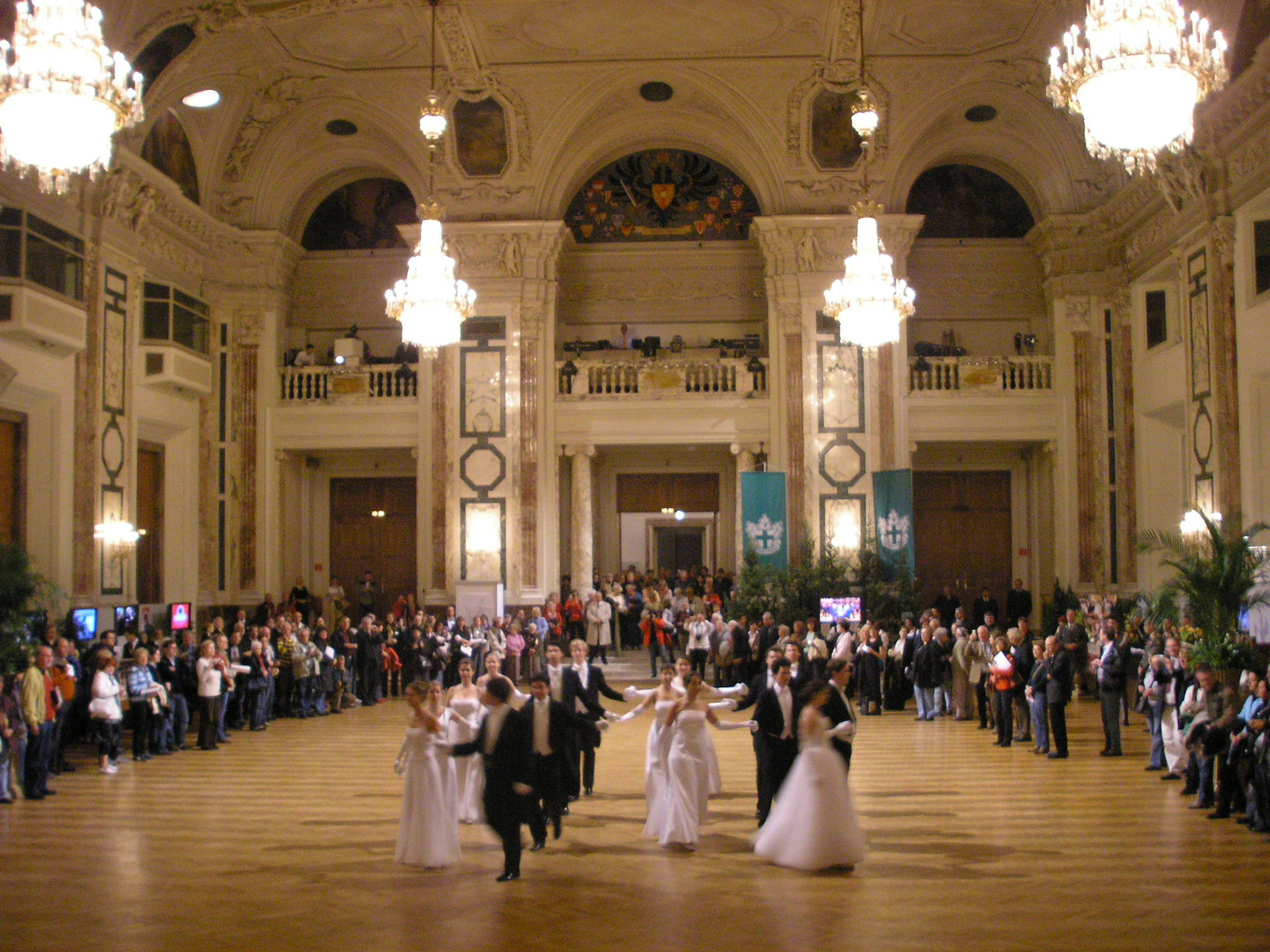
Cotillion figures demonstrated in the Festsaal, Hofburg, Vienna, in 2008

The cotillion (also cotillon or French country dance) is a social dance, popular in 18th-century Europe and North America. Originally for four couples in square formation, it was a courtly version of an English country dance, the forerunner of the quadrille and, in the United States, the square dance.

It was for some fifty years regarded as an ideal finale to a ball but was eclipsed in the early 19th century by the quadrille. It became so elaborate that it was sometimes presented as a concert dance performed by trained and rehearsed dancers. The later "German" cotillion included more couples as well as plays and games.

== Names ==
The English word cotillion is a variation of the French cotillon (which does not have i in the last syllable). In English, it is pronounced /kəˈtɪljən/ or /koʊˈtɪljən/; but in French, it is [kɔtijɔ̃].

The French word originally meant "petticoat (underskirt)" and is derived from Old French cote (‘cotte’) and the diminutive suffix -illon. There are two etymological theories as to how "underskirt" became a dance's name:

- The dance "revealed the underskirt".
- It is from the lyrics of a song that accompanied the dance: Ma commère, quand je danse, mon cotillon va-t-il bien ? (‘My friend, when I dance, does my petticoat show? [or: does my petticoat move well?]’).

In 18th-century French, the cotillon dance was also known as contredanse française, meaning "French country dance" or "French contradance".

== History ==
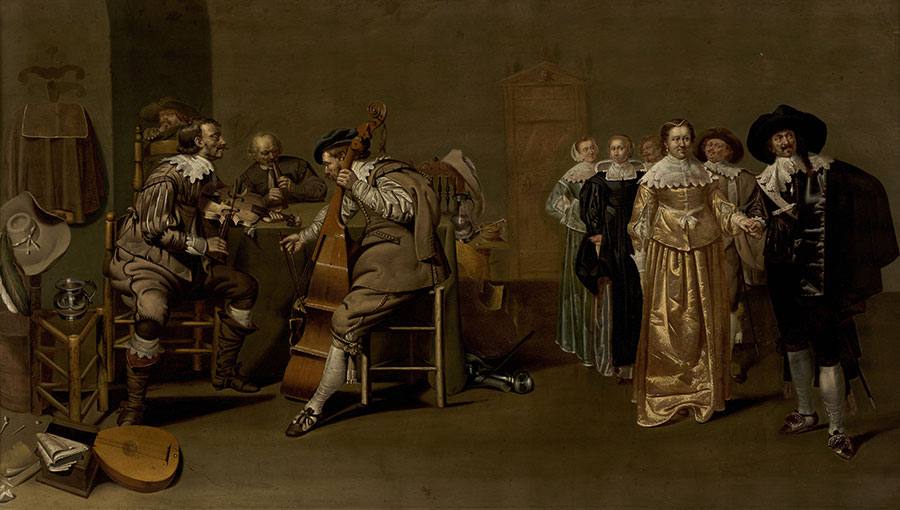
A mid-17th century painting by Jacob Duck, called The Cotillion, is the earliest possible reference to a dance with this name.

The name cotillion appears to have been in use as a dance-name at the beginning of the 18th century but, though it was only ever identified as a sort of country dance, it is impossible to say of what it consisted at that early date.

As we first encounter it, it consists of a main "figure" that varied from dance to dance and was interspersed with "changes" – a number of different figures that broke out of the square formation, often decided spontaneously by the leading couple or by a caller or "conductor". Each of these was designed to fit a tune of eight or occasionally sixteen measures of 2/4 time. Participants exchanged partners within the formation network of the dance. "Changes" included the "Great Ring", a simple circle dance with which the dance often began, as well as smaller Ladies' and Gentlemen's rings, top and bottom and sides rings, and chains. Other changes included the allemande, promenade and moulinet. A complete dance composed of a prescribed order of these was called a "set".

The cotillion was introduced into England by 1766 and to the United States in about 1772. In England from that time onwards there are a large number of references stressing its universal popularity in the best and highest circles of society, and many teaching manuals were published to help recall the vast number of changes that were invented. There is a reference in Robert Burns's 1790 poem Tam o' Shanter to the "cotillion brent-new frae France" (brand new from France).

Dancing masters differed as to the exact way of doing these dances: some, recognising the affair as an English country dance, taught that the steps and jumps of these were appropriate, while others insisted upon French elegance, recommending the basic step of the gavotte or the minuet. In reality many participants simply walked through the figure and changes, seeing these as the dance and the exact steps as dispensable. On the other hand, some figures required high skill at social dancing and many performances took place at which the majority preferred to watch rather than dance.

The quadrille gained fame a few years later as a variety of cotillion that could be danced by only two couples. In London in 1786 Longman & Broderip's 6th book of Twenty Four New Cotillions brings together for the first time the most characteristic dance-figures of the quadrille: Les Pantalons (‘trousers’), L'Été (‘summer’), La Belle Poule (‘the beautiful hen’) and La Pastorale. However, while the cotillion kept all the dancers in almost perpetual motion, the quadrille often allowed rest to half of the participants while the other half danced.

In the 1790s, the cotillion was falling from favour, but it re-emerged in a new style in the early years of the next century, with fewer and fewer changes, making it barely distinguishable from the newly-emerging quadrille, which was introduced into English high society by Lady Jersey in 1816 and by 1820 had eclipsed the cotillion, though it was recognisably a very similar dance, particularly as it also began to be danced by four couples. References to the English cotillion dances persist here and there until the 1840s, but these were more games than fashionable dances, and were often danced to the waltz or the mazurka.

L. P. Hartley's 1931 ghost story The Cotillon is centred around a masked cotillion at a country house.

=== United States ===
In the United States, however, the opposite was true: quadrilles were termed cotillions until the 1840s, when it was realised that all the distinctive figures of the earlier dance had been taken up into the newer. The German cotillion was introduced to New York society at a costume ball with a Louis XV theme given by William Colford Schermerhorn in the early winter of 1854. Here, too, waltzes, mazurkas, fun, games and boisterous behaviour at private parties took on a more important role, and only some figures of the earlier dances survived. Finally the term cotillion was used to refer to the ball itself and the cotillion and quadrille became the square dance.

== See also ==
- Debutante ball
- Philippine debut
