= I Still See You =

I Still See You may refer to:

- I Still See You (song), written by Michel Legrand and released in 1971 as a single by Scott Walker
- I Still See You (film), 2018 American thriller film, directed by Scott Speer
