= The Will and the Way =

The Will and the Way may refer to:

- The Will and the Way (module), a 1994 accessory for the Advanced Dungeons & Dragons role-playing game
- The Will and the Way (novel), a 1973 novel by L. P. Hartley

== See also ==
- A Will and a Way, a 1922 British silent comedy film
