= The Hireling =

1973 film directed by Alan Bridges

- original film poster
- Directed by: Alan Bridges
- Written by: Wolf Mankowitz
- Based on: The Hireling by L.P. Hartley
- Produced by: Ben Arbeid
- Starring: Robert Shaw; Sarah Miles
- Cinematography: Michael Reed
- Edited by: Peter Weatherley
- Music by: Marc Wilkinson
- Production company: World Film Services
- Distributed by: Columbia Pictures
- Release date: May 1973 (Cannes Film Festival): 10 June 1973 (New York City)
- Running time: 108 minutes
- Country: United Kingdom
- Language: English

The Hireling is a 1973 British drama film directed by Alan Bridges and starring Robert Shaw and Sarah Miles. It was written by Wolf Mankowitz based on the 1957 novel of the same title by L. P. Hartley, which tells the story of a chauffeur who falls in love with an aristocratic woman.

== Plot ==
Set in and around Bath, Somerset, immediately after the First World War, the story opens at an expensive mental clinic in the countryside where the young and recently widowed Lady Franklin is being discharged. The owner of a smart hire car, former sergeant-major Ledbetter, chauffeurs her to her unsympathetic mother in Bath. Hired to take her on outings, he becomes the only person she can talk to as she slowly lifts out of deep depression.

When he takes her to a boxing night at a boys' club that he helps to run, she meets another committee member, the young former officer Cantrip. Like Ledbetter, he is struggling to return to normalcy, in his case, politics, after his traumatic experiences in the war. Cantrip starts wooing the wealthy Lady Franklin while still sleeping with his lover Connie, who is likely a war widow.

Ledbetter's mental equilibrium becomes progressively more fragile. His business is failing, his casual relationship with the waitress Doreen brings no joy, his deepening affection for Lady Franklin is no longer returned, and his rage against his more successful rival is intensified by Cantrip's concealed involvement with Connie.

When he finally confronts Cantrip and Lady Franklin together, they tell him that he has no place in their lives because they have become engaged. Leaping into his Rolls-Royce and swigging frequently from a bottle of alcohol, he drives blindly back to his garage and proceeds to run amok in the little courtyard, driving heedlessly back and forth into the walls and reversing and on and on like an animal in a frenzy in a cage.

== Cast ==
- Robert Shaw as Steven Ledbetter
- Sarah Miles as Lady Franklin
- Peter Egan as Captain Hugh Cantrip
- Caroline Mortimer as Connie
- Elizabeth Sellars as Lady Franklin's mother
- Ian Hogg as Davis
- Christine Hargreaves as Doreen
- Lyndon Brook as Doctor
- Patricia Lawrence as Mrs. Hansen
- Petra Markham as Edith

== Reception ==
The Monthly Film Bulletin wrote: "Based on a book by L. P. Hartley, The Hireling appears to be more indebted to Joseph Losey than to the British novelist – an impression subtly (and perhaps unfairly) heightened by the casting of Sarah Miles as the target of the same backstairs machinations for which she was once a guileful agent in The Servant. But if the cross-fertilising of Losey's films (plus some uncomfortable echoes of Lady Chatterley's Lover) makes The Hireling an elegant compendium of the deja-vu whose several strands remain obstinately separate, the fault lies less with Alan Bridges' extremely smooth direction, or even with Wolf Mankowitz's dialogue (laboring its social significance with an explicitness which might make Pinter blush), than in the structure of the novel itself."

In Film Quarterly, William Johnson wrote: "The Hireling is less flashy and more gripping than the last adaptation of an L. P. Hartley novel – the Pinter-Losey Go-Between – and I suspect that most of the credit should go to the director, Alan Bridges. ... Writer Wolf Mankowitz, an expert in aggressive sentimentality (Expresso Bongo, A Kid for Two Farthings), itches to display Social Consciousness, and keeps trying to turn the film into a fearless attack on the English class system in the twenties. On the whole, Bridges manages to cool him down, losing out only in the 100% caddishness of the straw-figure politician and in the crude ending, when Shaw deliberately smashes up his Rolls while singing patriotic songs."

The Hollywood Reporter wrote: "It begins well – lucidly, tonally interesting, with an accurate sense of time and place. But, except for a delicately controlled and heartbreaking performance by Sarah Miles, who has never been so well used in a movie, the film goes from bad to worse to a horrendously awkward conclusion."

Variety wrote: "This heavily atmospheric painstakingly accoutred and splendidly acted pic of many qualities will need an adroit sell in most areas to prime the quality public as to its 'must-see' aspects. Outside this elite area (and eventual video exposure) it's not likely to be easy going. ... Item has quality written all over it, and patient viewers will savor its many plusses. Sarah Miles is splendid as the confused Lady, Robert Shaw fine as her momentarily blinded opposite, while a number of lesser roles are most capably filled as in most class efforts made in Blighty."

== Accolades ==
The film shared the Grand Prix du Festival International du Film (Palme d'Or) with Scarecrow at the 1973 Cannes Film Festival. Sarah Miles received a Special Jury Prize for her performance as Lady Franklin. Natasha Kroll won the 1974 BAFTA for art direction in 1974 for her work on the film.
