= The Shrimp and the Anemone =

1944 novel by L.P. Hartley

The Shrimp and the Anemone is a 1944 novel by L. P. Hartley. It is the first novel of the Eustace and Hilda Trilogy, the other two being The Sixth Heaven (1946) and Eustace and Hilda. The novel introduces the story of the siblings Eustace and Hilda.

== Plot introduction ==
According to Harry Blamires, "The swallowing of a shrimp by an anemone symbolises the central theme." Having lost their mother in childhood, Eustace sees Hilda as a "surrogate mother". The story recounts the story of the summer they spend together at the Norfolk coast.

In 1977, the novel was adapted into a miniseries directed by Desmond Davis.
