= The Betrayal (Hartley novel) =

Novel by Hartley

- First edition
- Author: L.P. Hartley
- Language: English
- Genre: Drama
- Publisher: Hamish Hamilton
- Publication date: 1966
- Media type: Print
- Preceded by: The Brickfield

The Betrayal is a 1966 novel by the British writer L.P. Hartley. It is a sequel to his 1964 work The Brickfield in which an elderly novelist recounts the experiences of his life for his memoirs.

== Bibliography ==
- Wright, Adrian. Foreign Country: The Life of L.P. Hartley. I. B. Tauris, 2001.
