= The Hireling (novel) =

1957 novel by L.P. Hartley

- First edition
- Author: L.P. Hartley
- Language: English
- Genre: Drama
- Publisher: Hamish Hamilton
- Publication date: 1957
- Media type: Print

The Hireling is a 1957 novel by the British writer L.P. Hartley. A widowed aristocrat bonds with the ex-soldier who drives his own car in a chauffeur service.

== Adaptation ==
In 1973 the novel was adapted into a British film of the same title directed by Alan Bridges and starring Robert Shaw and Sarah Miles.

== Bibliography ==
- Goble, Alan. The Complete Index to Literary Sources in Film. Walter de Gruyter, 1999.
- Wright, Adrian. Foreign Country: The Life of L.P. Hartley. I. B. Tauris, 2001.
