= L. P. Hartley =

English novelist and writer (1895–1972)

L. P. Hartley CBE
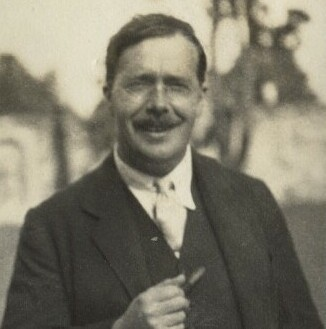
- Born: Leslie Poles Hartley; 30 December 1895; Whittlesey, Isle of Ely, England
- Died: 13 December 1972 (aged 76); London, England
- Education: Harrow School; Balliol College, Oxford
- Writing career
- Genres: Novel, short story
- Notable works: Eustace and Hilda (1947); The Go-Between (1953)
- Notable awards: James Tait Black Memorial Prize (1947); Heinemann Award (1953); Commander of the Order of the British Empire (1956); Companion of Literature by the Royal Society of Literature (1972)

Leslie Poles Hartley CBE (30 December 1895 – 13 December 1972) was an English novelist and short story writer. Although his first fiction was published in 1924, his best-known works are the Eustace and Hilda trilogy (1944–1947) and The Go-Between (1953). The latter was made into a film in 1971, as was his 1957 novel The Hireling in 1973.

Hartley began writing stories at the age of 11. He worked as an editor during his time at Oxford and spent many years afterwards writing book reviews. In his private life, Hartley spent much of his time rowing, swimming, and socializing, often traveling with friends. He made frequent visits to Venice for many years and enjoyed days out on the canals. His writing career began with short story collections, with his first novel, The Shrimp and the Anemone, published at age 49. He was known for writing about social codes, moral responsibility and family relationships, and many of his works portray passion as leading to disaster. Hartley died in December 1972 at the age of 76.

== Early life ==
Leslie Poles Hartley was born on 30 December 1895 in Whittlesey, now in Cambridgeshire. He was named after Leslie Stephen, the father of the writer Virginia Woolf. His father, Harry Bark Hartley, was a solicitor and justice of the peace near Peterborough but later ran a brickworks. His mother was Mary Elizabeth née Thompson, and he had two sisters, Enid and Annie Norah. Hartley was raised in the Methodist faith. He was known to be a hypochondriac, particularly afraid of tetanus and a painful death. Many believe this fear of sickness came from his mother, who was known to be overly concerned about his health.

While he was young, his family moved to Fletton Tower, near Peterborough. Hartley began his education at home and particularly enjoyed the work of Edgar Allan Poe. He wrote his first story, a fairy tale about a prince and dwarf, when he was 11 years old. In 1908 he attended Northdown Hill Preparatory School in Cliftonville and then briefly Clifton College. It was there he likely first met C. H. B. Kitchin, who became a lifelong friend. In 1910, Hartley finally settled at Harrow School, where he was a Leaf Scholar and earned prizes in reading and English literature. Highly regarded by his peers, they saw him as civilized and mature with a "singular outward calm". While there, Hartley converted to Anglicanism but was still greatly influenced by his earlier Methodism.

In 1915, during the First World War, he went to Balliol College, Oxford, to read Modern History. This period was a time when most of his contemporaries were volunteering for the armed services instead of pursuing university careers. In 1916, with the arrival of conscription, Hartley joined the army, and in February 1917, he was commissioned as an officer in the Norfolk Regiment; however, he never saw active duty because of a weak heart. He returned to Oxford in 1919, with the intention of becoming a writer. While there, Hartley made a number of literary friends, including Lord David Cecil and Aldous Huxley. He left Oxford in 1921 with second-class honours in modern history.

== Career ==
=== Editor and reviewer ===
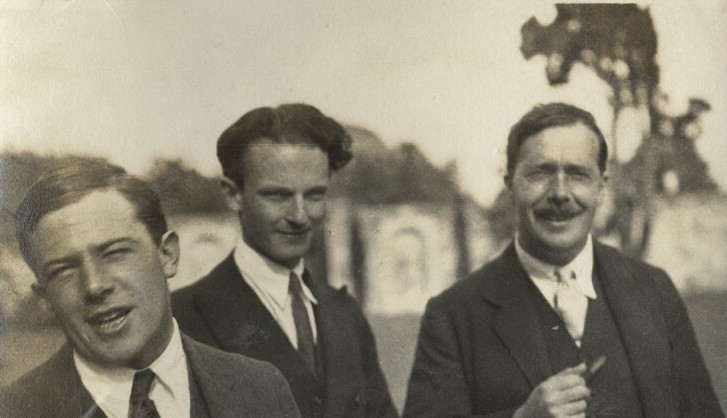
(left to right) Sir Maurice Bowra, Sylvester Govett Gates and Hartley by Lady Ottoline Morrell, 1920s

Oxford Poetry first published Hartley's work in 1920 and 1922. During this time, he edited Oxford Outlook with Gerald Howard and A. B. B. Valentine, publishing work by L. A. G. Strong, Edmund Blunden, John Strachey, and Maurice Bowra. His essays, short stories, and reviews were included in its pages.

In this early part of his career, Hartley spent most of his time broadening his social life. He was introduced by Huxley to Lady Ottoline Morrell, who welcomed him into her famed literary circle. Kitchin, with whom he had been reunited at Oxford, introduced him to Cynthia Asquith, who became a lifelong friend. He also met the writer and socialite Elizabeth Bibesco, whose support and status catapulted Hartley into aristocratic British circles. Although he enjoyed rapid social success, his career as a writer was slow to take off.

After his years at Oxford, Hartley worked as a book reviewer. He wrote articles for multiple publications, such as The Spectator, Saturday Review, The Nation and Athenaeum, and The Sketch. Hartley was praised extensively for his critical, steady, and wise reviews. However, the large number of books he had to read distracted him from his goal to write novels.

=== Short stories and novels ===
In 1924, he met Constant Huntington of G. P. Putnam, who published his first volume of short stories, Night Fears, in that year, as well as his novella Simonetta Perkins in 1925. Night Fears was relatively unsuccessful, earning him no money. Simonetta Perkins brought him only £12, though it was written about favourably. The Saturday Review called the young writer "one of the most hopeful talents", and The Calendar of Modern Letters said that Simonetta Perkins was a "distinguished first novel". Modern critics have called it his most dangerous novel, as Hartley explored infatuation and sexuality in a way considered less respectable at the time. In 1932, Hartley published The Killing Bottle, a collection of ghost stories. Cynthia Asquith included some of them in an anthology, which increased his popularity with the public.

Hartley did not publish The Shrimp and the Anemone, his first full-length novel, until the age of 49. He had started and stopped writing the novel many times and even submitted it to a writing contest under a different name, but it did not win. The main characters, Eustace and Hilda, were inspired by Hartley himself and his sister Enid. He continued the series with the novels The Sixth Heaven and Eustace and Hilda. The trilogy explores the ideas of childhood nostalgia and the reality of adulthood. By the time of the third book's publication, Hartley had become a well-known author. Critics reviewed the books favourably, often marvelling at the author's ability to create characters that were lovable despite their high-class status. Walter Allen in the New Statesman called the trilogy "one of the few masterpieces in contemporary fiction", and other critics agreed in similar reviews. Some, however, found the plentiful Italian dialogue pretentious. Despite the overwhelmingly good reviews, Hartley most valued the reactions of his friends and fellow writers. Both Edith Sitwell and C. H. B. Kitchin wrote him touching letters, expressing their awe and love of the novel.

After writing a few more novels with moderate success, Hartley wrote The Go-Between in just five months. Having left his previous publisher after disputes over compensation, he decided to publish this one with Hamish Hamilton. Critics' reviews were enthusiastic, and Knopf immediately wanted to publish the novel in the United States. There, it became extremely popular and even made The New York Times's bestseller list. The novel was translated into Italian, French, Danish, Norwegian, Swedish, Finnish and Japanese. Hartley gained favour with other writers as well. W. H. Auden read the book and told Hartley that he was his favourite novelist. Many of Hartley's friends drew parallels between him and the main character Leo; just like Hartley, Leo was stuck between his middle-class upbringing and his high-class social circle. Hartley had intended The Go-Between to be a commentary on the loss of innocence and morality; however, he was shocked when he found that many readers sympathized with the characters he thought should be hated. He was known to be a strict moralist, once describing compassion as doing away with moral worth and a substitute for justice.

== Personal life ==
While attending Oxford, Hartley proposed to Joan Mews; it is not known whether she accepted his proposal or not. In 1922, he suffered a nervous breakdown. In 1922, he made his first of many visits to Venice, Italy, and it became an escape for him from the pressures of life in England. He travelled there with his aristocratic circle, eventually buying a home next to the church of San Sebastiano. A statue of Saint Sebastian outside the church, with arrows piercing his body, had a great influence on Hartley, as he would soon come to see the saint as "a symbol of mankind". While there, he owned a gondola, employed his own personal gondolier, and was known to spend entire days on the canals. He also entertained many guests – including the painter Henry Lamb, the art critic Adrian Stokes, and the novelist Leo Myers – and often set his writing aside to focus on social events.

During the later part of his life, Hartley resided in London at Rutland Gate, enjoying rowing on the Avon River in his free time. He was known to have many servants, a number of whom became dear companions and appeared in his novels. Hartley became relatively reclusive during these years, no longer attending the social gatherings that had punctuated much of his earlier life. Hartley enjoyed reading a number of his contemporary authors, such as Elizabeth Bowen, Edith Wharton, and Henry Green.

During his trips to Venice, David Cecil joined him many times, leading many to believe that Hartley was homosexual. The first novel in which he included homosexual characters was My Fellow Devils – but instead of painting their sexuality in a favourable light, he portrays it as the reason for a friendship's ruin. He regarded his 1971 novel The Harness Room as his "homosexual novel" and feared the public reaction to it. Hartley died in London on 13 December 1972, aged 76, and was cremated at Golders Green Crematorium.

=== Conflicts with Virginia Woolf and Cynthia Asquith ===
Although Hartley joined the Chelsea literary group, the Bloomsbury group was also prominent in England at the time. The Bloomsbury circle was more popular, but Hartley had no interest in joining them. He expressed his distaste for Virginia Woolf after her novel The Waves was published, asking Raymond Mortimer of the Bloomsbury group: "What are the Wild Waves saying?" On another occasion Woolf asked Hartley "Have you written any more shabby books, Mr. Hartley?", particularly referring to "the one that might have been written by a man with one foot in England and the other in Venice". She advised him to change his writing style.

Cynthia Asquith was a support through much of Hartley's career, publishing some of his early writings in her anthologies and welcoming him into her social circles. However, feelings started to change after Hartley did not allow her to publish his novel The Go-Between. Asquith reminded him of this fact often, and Hartley came to believe that the only reason she continued to be friends with him was his increased popularity. At one point, Asquith convinced Hartley's cook to leave him and work for her. On another occasion, she gave him a drink of vinegar instead of alcohol.

== Major themes and influences ==
The major influences on Hartley's work were Nathaniel Hawthorne, Henry James, and Emily Brontë. His books often explore themes of social and personal morality—often depicting passion as a route to disaster, particularly outside of marriage. He wrote about characters on the brink between adolescence and adulthood, contrasting childhood innocence with eventual self-knowledge. Hartley's novels frequently comment on cultural traditions and moral values. He is known for using symbolism to express tension stemming from moral motivations. He is also praised for introducing fantasy, horror, and mysticism to comment on the mystery of existence. In columns Hartley wrote for The Daily Telegraph, he often expressed a distaste for the flaws of contemporary culture. Beginning in 1952, Hartley travelled in England, Germany, Italy, and Portugal to lecture about his critical ideas.

== Awards and legacy ==
Hartley was awarded the James Tait Black Memorial Prize for his 1947 novel Eustace and Hilda, and his 1953 novel The Go-Between was joint winner of the Heinemann Award. He was appointed a Commander of the Order of the British Empire in the 1956 New Year Honours. In 1972, he was named a Companion of Literature by the Royal Society of Literature. He was the head of the English section of P.E.N. and was also a member of the management council of the Society of Authors.

In 1971, the director Joseph Losey made a film based on Hartley's novel The Go-Between, starring Julie Christie and Alan Bates. In 1991, the filmmaker Clive Dunn directed a documentary about Hartley for Anglia Television, titled Bare Heaven.

== List of works ==
Works by Hartley include the following:

- Night Fears (1924):
  - "The Island", "Talent", "Night Fears", "The Telephone Call", "St. George and the Dragon", "Friends of the Bridegroom", "A Portrait", "A Sentimental Journey", "A Beautiful Character", "A Summons", "A Visit to the Dentist", "The New Prime Minister", "A Condition of Release", "A Tonic", "Witheling End", "Apples", "The Last Time"
- Simonetta Perkins (1925)
- The Killing Bottle (1932):
  - "A Visitor from Down Under", "The Killing Bottle", "Conrad and the Dragon", "A Change of Ownership", "The Cotillon", "Feet Foremost"
- The Shrimp and the Anemone (1944), Eustace and Hilda Trilogy I
- The Sixth Heaven (1946), Eustace and Hilda Trilogy II
- Eustace and Hilda (1947), Eustace and Hilda Trilogy III
- The Travelling Grave and Other Stories (1948):
  - "A Visitor from Down Under", "Podolo", "Three, or Four, for Dinner", "The Travelling Grave", "Feet Foremost", "The Cotillon", "A Change of Ownership", "The Thought", "Conrad and the Dragon", "The Island", "Night Fears", "The Killing Bottle"
- The Boat (1949)
- My Fellow Devils (1951)
- The Go-Between (1953)
- The White Wand and Other Stories (1954):
  - "The White Wand", "Apples", "A Tonic", "A Condition of Release", "Witheling End", "Mr Blandfoot's Picture", "A Rewarding Experience", "W.S.", "The Vaynes", "Monkshood Manor", "Up the Garden Path", "Hilda's Garden", "A Summons", "The Price of the Absolute"
- A Perfect Woman (1955)
- The Hireling (1957)
- Facial Justice (1960)
- Two for the River (1961):
  - "Two for the River", "Someone in the Lift", "The Face", "The Corner Cupboard", "The Waits", "The Pampas Clump", "Won by a Fall", "A Very Present Help", "A High Dive", "The Crossways", "Per Far L'Amore", "Interference", "Noughts and Crosses", "The Pylon"
- The Brickfield (1964)
- The Betrayal (1966)
- Essays by Divers Hands, Volume XXXIV (1966), editor
- The Novelist's Responsibility (1967), essays
- Poor Clare (1968)
- The Collected Short Stories of L. P. Hartley (1968)
- The Love-Adept: A Variation on a Theme (1969)
- My Sisters' Keeper (1970)
- Mrs. Carteret Receives (1971):
  - "Mrs Carteret Receives", "Paradise Paddock", "Pains and Pleasures", "Please Do Not Touch", "Roman Charity", "Home Sweet Home", "The Shadow on the Wall", "The Silver Clock", "Fall In at the Double"
- The Harness Room (1971)
- The Collections: A Novel (1972)
- The Will and the Way (1973)
- The Complete Short Stories of L. P. Hartley (1973)
- The Collected Macabre Stories (2001):
  - "From the Introduction to Lady Cynthia Asquith’s Third Ghost Book", "A Visitor from Down Under", "Podolo", "Three, or Four, for Dinner", "The Travelling Grave", "Feet Foremost", "The Cotillon", "A Change of Ownership", "The Thought", "Conrad and the Dragon", "The Island", "Night Fears", "The Killing Bottle", "A Summons", "W.S.", "The Two Vaynes", "Monkshood Manor", "Two for the River", "Someone in the Lift", "The Face", "The Corner Cupboard", "The Waits", "The Pampas Clump", "The Crossways", "Per Far L'Amore", "Interference", "The Pylon", "Mrs Carteret Receives", "Fall In at the Double", "Paradise Paddock", "Roman Charity", "Pains and Pleasures", "Please Do Not Touch", "Home Sweet Home", "The Shadow on the Wall", "The Sound of Voices", "Mrs G. G.", "The Stain on the Chair"

== Sources ==
- Bien, Peter (1963). L. P. Hartley. University Park, PA: The Pennsylvania State University Press.
- Bloomfield, Paul (1970). L. P. Hartley. Writers and Their Work 217. Harlow, Essex: Longman Group Ltd. pp. 5–33. ISBN 978-0582012165.
- D'Aquila, Ulysses (February 1997). "Reviews: Gay men's biography". Lamda Book Report. 5 (8): 24–25.
- Jones, Edward T. (1978). L. P. Hartley. G. K. Hall & Co. ISBN 0-8057-6703-7.
- Wright, Adrian (1996). Foreign Country: The Life of L. P. Hartley. London: Andre Deutsch Limited. ISBN 978-0233989761.
