= The Harness Room =

1971 novel by L.P. Hartley

- First edition
- Author: L.P. Hartley
- Language: English
- Genre: Drama
- Publisher: Hamish Hamilton
- Publication date: 1971
- Media type: Print

The Harness Room is a 1971 novel by the British writer L.P. Hartley. A retired colonel about to remarry decides that his seventeen-year-old son needs toughening up and while away on his honeymoon has his chauffeur, an ex-guardsman to instruct him in boxing and other sports in the harness room. The two men come to develop a bond.

Concerned about the reception of a book that was more explicitly homosexual in theme than his earlier works, Hartley insisted to his publisher that it was done "in a more discreet manner than it is in many modern novels". Hartley considered that "I actually took more trouble over The Harness Room than any of my novels".

== Bibliography ==
- Wright, Adrian. Foreign Country: The Life of L.P. Hartley. I. B. Tauris, 2001.
