= A Perfect Woman =

1955 British novel

- First edition
- Author: L. P. Hartley
- Language: English
- Genre: Drama
- Publisher: Hamish Hamilton
- Publication date: 1955
- Media type: Print

A Perfect Woman is a 1955 novel by the British writer L. P. Hartley.

== Plot ==
Harold Eastwood, an unimaginative accountant, meets Alec Goodrich, a well-known novelist, on a train, and agrees to take on his tax affairs. When Alec comes to visit, he is immediately smitten by Irma, an Austrian barmaid in a local pub, and Isabel Eastwood, Harold's wife, is immediately smitten by him. She believes it is her duty to procure Irma for Alec. Harold finds the idea initially rather shocking, but Isabel manages to persuade him that it will benefit both parties, providing a better life for Irma and improving Alec's novels, which have been criticised for being too full of unpleasant, bitter women.

So Harold agrees to ask Irma to dinner, and soon he starts an affair with her. Isabel, meanwhile, has a relationship with Alec, and spends increasing amounts of time with him in London. Initially the marriage rather benefits from this. Harold becomes a great deal more cheerful, even playful, and Isabel is grateful for this. But when Isabel gets hold of the manuscript of Alec's latest novel, things take a dramatic and alarming turn.

== Bibliography ==
- Dinah Birch & Margaret Drabble. The Oxford Companion to English Literature. OUP Oxford, 2009.
