= The Boat (novel) =

1949 novel by L. P. Hartley

- First US edition
- Author: L.P. Hartley
- Language: English
- Genre: Drama
- Publisher: Putnam (UK); Doubleday (US)
- Publication date: 1949
- Media type: Print

The Boat is a 1949 novel by British writer L.P. Hartley. An English writer returns home from Venice, and takes residence in a house by a river where he can indulge his passion in rowing.

== Bibliography ==
- Wright, Adrian. Foreign Country: The Life of L.P. Hartley. I. B. Tauris, 2001.
