= My Sisters' Keeper =

1970 novel by L.P. Hartley

- First edition
- Author: L.P. Hartley
- Language: English
- Genre: Drama
- Publisher: Hamish Hamilton
- Publication date: 26 March 1970
- Media type: Print

My Sisters' Keeper is a 1970 novel by the British writer L.P. Hartley.

== Bibliography ==
- Wright, Adrian. Foreign Country: The Life of L.P. Hartley. I. B. Tauris, 2001.
