= Poor Clare (novel) =

1968 novel by L.P. Hartley

- First edition
- Author: L.P. Hartley
- Language: English
- Genre: Drama
- Publisher: Hamish Hamilton
- Publication date: 1968
- Media type: Print

Poor Clare is a 1968 novel by the British writer L.P. Hartley. After inheriting some fine works of art from his aunt, a composer surprises everyone when he gives them away to his friends, leading all to wonder if there is some ulterior motive.

== Bibliography ==
- Wright, Adrian. Foreign Country: The Life of L.P. Hartley. I. B. Tauris, 2001.
