= The Brickfield =

1964 novel by L.P. Hartley

- First edition
- Author: L.P. Hartley
- Cover artist: Val Biro
- Language: English
- Genre: Drama
- Publisher: Hamish Hamilton
- Publication date: 1964
- Media type: Print
- Followed by: The Betrayal

The Brickfield is a 1964 novel by the British writer L.P. Hartley. An elderly author dictates his memoirs, recalling his youthful years. It was followed by a sequel The Betrayal in 1966.

== Bibliography ==
- Dinah Birch & Margaret Drabble. The Oxford Companion to English Literature. OUP Oxford, 2009.
