= Simonetta Perkins =

1925 novella by L.P. Hartley

- First edition
- Author: L.P. Hartley
- Language: English
- Genre: Drama
- Publisher: Putnam
- Publication date: 1925
- Media type: Print

Simonetta Perkins is a 1925 novella by the British writer L. P. Hartley. A young Bostonian woman visiting Venice with her overbearing mother quickly tires of her fellow American tourists and begins to fixate on a handsome gondolier.

== Bibliography ==
- Wright, Adrian. Foreign Country: The Life of L.P. Hartley. I. B. Tauris, 2001.
