= C. H. B. Kitchin =

British novelist (1895–1967)

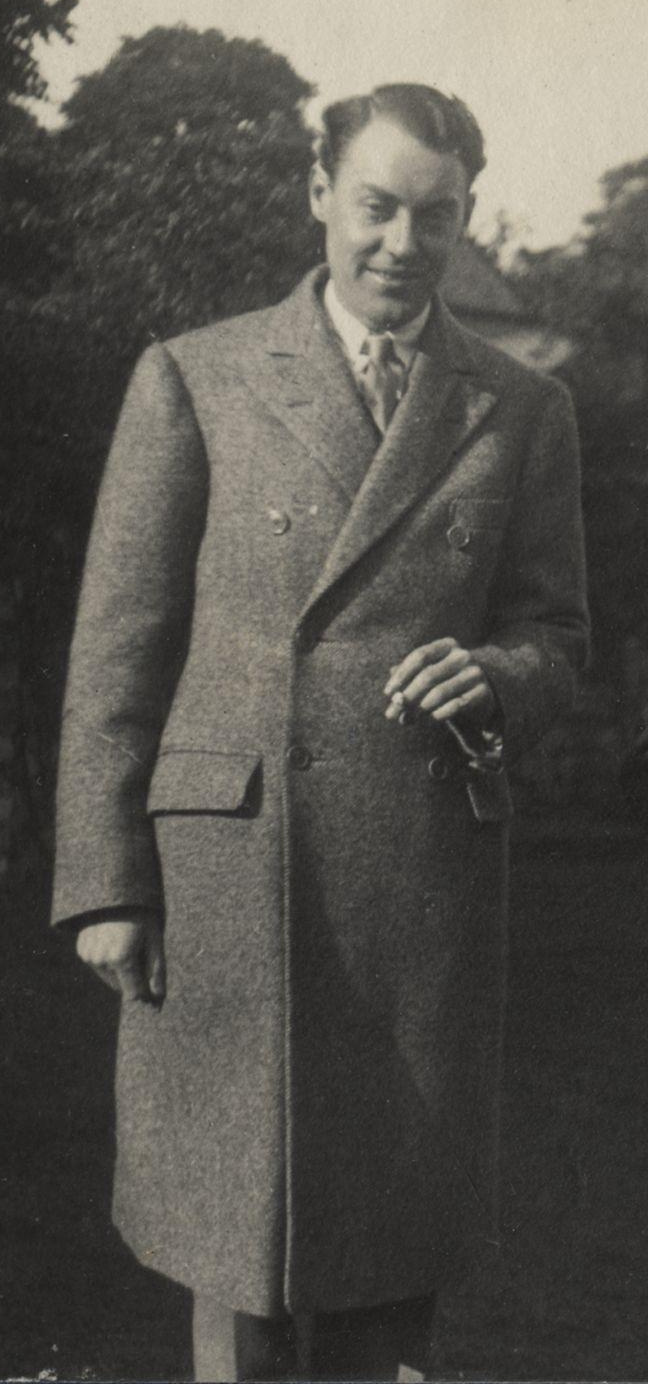
- A June 1924 photo of C. H. B. Kitchin by Lady Ottoline Morrell
- Born: Clifford Henry Benn Kitchin; 17 October 1895; Harrogate, Yorkshire, England
- Died: 4 April 1967 (aged 71); Brighton, United Kingdom
- Education: Exeter College, Oxford
- Occupations: Author; stockbroker
- Partner: Clive Bertram Preen

Clifford Henry Benn Kitchin (17 October 1895 – 4 April 1967) was a British novelist of the early twentieth century.

== Biography ==
Clifford Henry Benn Kitchin was born in Harrogate, Yorkshire, the elder son of Clifford Kitchin (1860–1913), a barrister. He attended Clifton College and read Classics at Exeter College, Oxford. Like his father before him, he became a barrister and a member of the London Stock Exchange.

After university he volunteered for the army and served in France from 1916 to 1918.

Kitchin was skilled at wide range of talents, with some examples being a classical scholar, avante garde poet, linguist, and botanist; he was also gifted at playing chess, bridge and piano. A large inheritance allowed him to devote his time to writing and other pastimes, including gambling at Monte Carlo and the breeding and racing of greyhounds, at both of which he was something of a success. He was also a collector of objets d’art, first editions and antiques including Georgian silver and Meissen teapots; he would visit sales, auctions and dealers in his blue Rolls Royce, which he loved and drove “enthusiastically”.

In the 1920s and 1930s Kitchin owned a house in Chiddingly, East Sussex.

During the Second World War Kitchin gave up writing to become a schoolmaster and landowner in Herefordshire.

In the late 1940s Kitchin lived in Cornwall in a house on the Helford river, where he kept a large motor yacht.

Kitchin’s friend and fellow writer L P Hartley included an essay about him in his 1967 collection “The Novelist’s Responsibilities” as well as a foreword to his final and posthumous novel.

Kitchin was gay and lived with his lover Clive Bertram Preen until Preen's death in 1944.

Kitchin’s first publications were poetry and in the early 1920s he was a contributor to Wheels, a literary periodical. He also wrote for “Oxford Poetry 1920” which he edited together with Alan Porter and Vera Brittain.

Kitchin’s first five novels were published by the Hogarth Press, owned and run by Leonard and Virginia Woolf who were admirers of his work. His first two novels were well reviewed but popular acclaim eluded him and he decided to write a detective story to reach a wider readership. “The Death Of My Aunt” appeared in 1929 and quickly became a bestseller.

This attempt to raise his profile proved too successful. The success of the book in the UK and US generated a demand for more crime fiction from Kitchin. (In later years he came to refer to it as “that wretched book”.) Kitchin went on to write three more crime novels featuring the stockbroker sleuth Malcolm Warren over the next twenty years.

Kitchin’s final novel, “A Short Walk In Williams Park” was published posthumously in 1971.

He is best known for his four detective stories featuring amateur sleuth Malcolm Warren, a stockbroker like Kitchin. However he also wrote and published eleven other novels in a career spanning forty years. These were critically acclaimed but never popular, and Kitchin was perennially disappointed by the sales of these more serious, literary works.

He was one of Francis King's two mentors, the other being J. R. Ackerley. Five of his novels with gay themes—The Sensitive One, Birthday Party, Ten Pollitt Place, The Book of Life, and A Short Walk in Williams Park—have been reprinted by Valancourt Books.

== Works ==
- Curtains. Oxford: B.H. Blackwell, 1919. (poetry)
- Winged Victory. Oxford: B.H. Blackwell, 1920. (poetry)
- Streamers Waving. London: Hogarth Press, 1925.
- Mr. Balcony. London: Hogarth Press, 1927.
- The Sensitive One. London: Hogarth Press, 1931.
- Olive E.. London: Constable & Co, 1937.
- The Birthday Party. London: Constable & Co, 1938.
- The Auction Sale. London: Secker & Warburg, 1949.
- Jumping Joan and other stories. London: Secker & Warburg, 1954.
- The Secret River. London: Secker & Warburg, 1956.
- Ten Pollitt Place. London: Secker & Warburg, 1957.
- The Book of Life. London: Peter Davies, 1960.
- A Short Walk in Williams Park. London: Chatto & Windus, 1971.

=== Malcolm Warren series ===
- Death of My Aunt. London: Hogarth Press, 1929.
- Crime at Christmas. London: Hogarth Press, 1934.
- Death of His Uncle. London: Constable & Co, 1939.
- The Cornish Fox. London: Secker & Warburg, 1949.
