= The Go-Between =

1953 novel by L. P. Hartley

- First edition
- Author: L. P. Hartley
- Cover artist: Val Biro
- Language: English
- Genre: Bildungsroman, novel
- Set in: Norfolk, 1900
- Publisher: Hamish Hamilton
- Publication date: 1953
- Publication place: England
- Media type: Hardcover
- OCLC: 33237584
- Dewey Decimal: 823.912
- LC Class: PR6015.A6723 G6

The Go-Between is a novel by L. P. Hartley published in 1953. His best-known work, it has been adapted several times for stage and screen. The book gives a critical view of society at the end of the Victorian era through the eyes of a naïve schoolboy outsider.

== Synopsis ==
In the book's prologue, Leo Colston chances upon a diary from 1900, the year of his thirteenth birthday, and gradually pieces together a memory that he has suppressed. Under its influence, and from the viewpoint of what he has become by the midpoint of "this hideous century", Leo relives the events of what had once seemed to him its hopeful beginning. The importance of his boarding school's social rules is another theme running through the book and complicates Leo's interaction with the adult world.

"Curses" of his devising had routed boys who were bullying Leo at school and had given him the reputation of a magician, something that he came to half-believe himself. As a result, he is invited as a guest to spend the summer at Brandham Hall, the country home of his school friend Marcus Maudsley, who comes from a wealthy family. The Maudsleys are renting Brandham Hall from the aristocratic Hugh, Viscount Trimingham, the descendant of the area's nobility; Mrs Maudsley intends her daughter Marian to marry Trimingham in order to consolidate the family's social position. The socially clumsy Leo, with his regional accent, is a middle-class boy among the wealthy upper class. Although he does not fit into this society, his hosts do their best to make him feel welcome, treating him with kindness and indulgence, especially Marian.

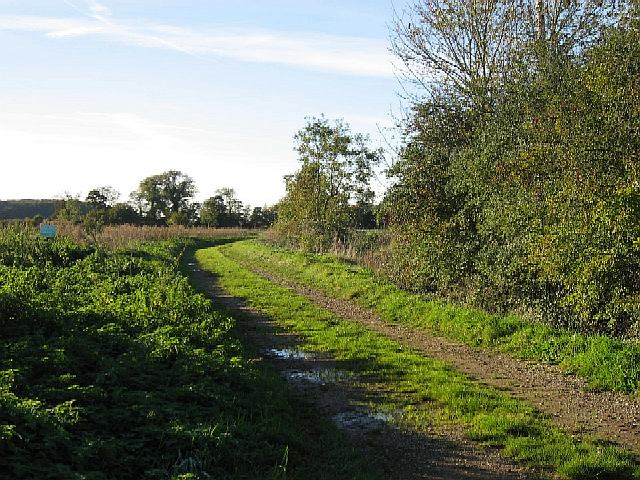
A footpath through marshy ground on the way to Bradenham, the possible Norfolk location of the novel

When Marcus falls ill, Leo is left largely to his own devices and becomes a secret "postman" for Marian and nearby tenant farmer Ted Burgess, with whom she is having a clandestine relationship. Leo is happy to help Marian because he has a crush on her and likes Ted. Besides, Leo is initially ignorant of the significance or content of the messages that he is asked to carry between them, and the well-meaning, innocent boy is easily manipulated by the lovers. Although Marian and Ted are fully aware of the social taboo that must make their relationship a matter of the utmost secrecy, Leo is too naïve to understand why they never can marry.

As he begins to comprehend that the relationship between Marian and Ted is not to do with "business" as they have claimed, Leo naively believes that Marian's engagement to Trimingham ought to bring the correspondence between her and Ted to an end. Feeling increasingly uncomfortable about the general atmosphere of deception and risk, Leo tries to end his role as go-between but comes under great psychological pressure, and he is forced to continue. Ultimately, his unwilling involvement has disastrous consequences when Marian's mother makes him accompany her as she tracks the lovers to their hiding place and discovers them having sex. The trauma that results leads directly to Ted's suicide and Leo's nervous collapse.

In the epilogue, the older Leo summarises how profoundly the experience has affected him. Forbidding himself to think about the scandal, he had shut down his emotions and imaginative nature, leaving room only for facts. As a result, he never has been able to establish intimate relationships. Now, looking back on the events through the eyes of a mature adult, he feels it is important to return to Brandham some 50 years later in order to tie up loose ends. There he meets Marian's grandson and finds Marian living in her former nanny's cottage. He also learns that Trimingham had married Marian and acknowledged Ted's son by her as his own. Trimingham had died in 1910; Marcus and his elder brother had died in World War I, and Marian's son died in World War II. In the end, the elderly Marian persuades Leo, the only other survivor from her past, to act once more as go-between and assure her estranged grandson that there was nothing to be ashamed of in her affair with Ted Burgess.

== Reception ==
The Go-Between was first published in Britain by Hamish Hamilton in 1953. In the United States, it was first published by Alfred A. Knopf in the summer of 1954, and the book was slow to sell at first. However, it was greeted with favourable reviews. The New York Times called it "a triumph of literary architecture", while two articles were devoted to it in the Los Angeles Times. Joseph Henry Jackson commented on its skilful presentation as "a many-leveled affair; perhaps only the author knows how much there is in it of symbol and reference." A month later Milton Merlin described it as "a superbly composed and an irresistibly haunting novel" characterised by "the author's beautiful and ingenious style, his whimsy, irony and humor, and, most of all, the powerful wallop of a deceptively simple, almost gentle story of a boy lost in a strange world of emotions."

There have been regular editions from Penguin Books and other sources since 1958. By 1954, translations were being prepared in Swedish, Danish, Norwegian, Finnish, Japanese, French and Italian. Others followed later in Spanish, Portuguese, Russian, Romanian and German. The novel has also been set as an exam text with a dedicated study guide and there have been interdisciplinary studies on the book’s psychological and philosophical themes.

== Interpretations ==
Later literary interpretations looked beyond the book's immediately noticeable themes. For Colm Tóibín in his introduction to a 2002 reprint, the book is not really "a drama about class or about England, or a lost world mourned by Hartley; instead it is a drama about Leo's deeply sensuous nature moving blindly, in a world of rich detail and beautiful sentences, toward a destruction that is impelled by his own intensity of feeling and, despite everything, his own innocence." Kevin Gardner cites the narrative technique among other complex treatments of time: "Hartley's haunting tale of lost innocence underscores the modern experience of broken time, a paradox in which humanity is alienated from the past, yet not free from it, a past that continues to exist in and to control the subconscious ... This doubling of consciousness and of narrative voice—the innocent twelve-year-old's emerging from beneath the self-protective sixty-five-year-old's—is one of Hartley's most effective techniques."

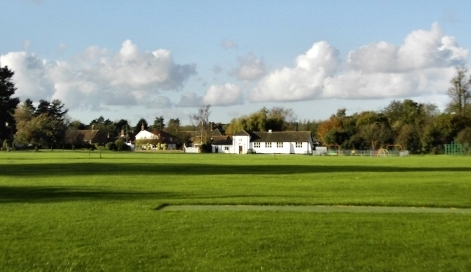
Bradenham Village Green, which is still used by the village cricket club

Another preoccupation in Tóibín's introduction was how far the story of The Go-Between is based on fact, in the wake of Adrian Wright's biographical study Foreign Country: The Life of L. P. Hartley. Although Leo is 12 at the time of the novel – the long, hot summer of 1900 – the five-year-old Hartley remembered that time afterwards as "a Golden Age". When he was about Leo's age in 1909, Hartley spent a summer with a school friend called Moxley at Bradenham Hall in Norfolk and took part in a cricket match. The names are sufficiently close to Maudsley and Brandham to give rise to such speculation. However, Tóibín counsels a cautious approach to the question, quoting Hartley's study of fiction-writing The Novelist's Responsibility. The novelist's world, he wrote "must, in some degree, be an extension of his own life", and while it is "unsafe to assume that a novelist's work is autobiographical in any direct sense," this idea does not prevent it from reflecting his experience.

Among other writers commenting on the book's contemporary context, Paul Binding has pointed out that its famous opening phrase "The past is a foreign country; they do things differently there" can be traced to one used by Hartley's friend Lord David Cecil in his inaugural lecture as Goldsmith's Professor of English Literature at Oxford in 1949. Ian McEwan has described his acclaimed novel Atonement (2001) as "an act of homage in some ways" to The Go-Between in an interview, recalling that while reading the novel for the first time at 14 he was "electrified" by "the way you can wrap a fictional story around real events and real things and give it a vivid quality it would not otherwise have". Ali Smith revisited the observed parallel drawn between the treatment of class and sexuality in The Go-Between and in Lady Chatterley's Lover (1928). D.H. Lawrence's novel was not allowed unexpurgated circulation in Britain until after The Go-Between's appearance, but perhaps, she speculated, Hartley's novel helped prepare the climate for the overturning of the British ban on Lawrence's work seven years later.

== Adaptations ==
=== Play ===
In 1960, an adaptation for stage by Louise F. Tanner was produced in Morgantown, West Virginia. Tanner travelled to the United Kingdom to consult Hartley in person about the work.

=== Film ===
Playwright Harold Pinter adapted the novel into a screenplay of a film of the same name (1971), directed by Joseph Losey.

=== Television ===
A television adaptation starring Jim Broadbent was broadcast on BBC One on 20 September 2015.

=== Radio ===
On 2 January 1961, a radio adaptation by Archie Campbell and narrated by Denys Blakelock was broadcast on BBC Home Service. The production was re-broadcast on 10 July 1961. The production was re-broadcast in July 2024 on Radio 4 Extra as part of the Hidden Treasures series.

On 25 May 2002, a new dramatisation by Laurie Graham for The Saturday Play, BBC Radio 4.

On 8 July 2012, an adaptation by Frances Byrnes and directed by Matt Thompson was broadcast on BBC Radio 3. The production was re-broadcast on BBC Radio 3 on 26 May 2013.

=== Opera ===
In 1991, South African composer David Earl adapted the novel as a two-act opera.

=== Musical theatre ===
In 2011, a musical theatre adaptation of the novel was presented by the West Yorkshire Playhouse in Leeds, West Yorkshire;at the Derby Live! Theatre in Derby, East Midlands; and at the Royal & Derngate in Northampton, East Midlands. The production won the Best Musical Award at the 2012 UK Theatre Awards. Adapted by David Wood with music by Richard Taylor and lyrics by Wood and Taylor, the same production was remounted and opened at London's Apollo Theatre on 27 May 2016 and played its full twenty-week engagement, closing on 15 October 2016.

== Bibliography ==
- Colm O Tóibín, introduction to The Go-Between, The New York Review of Books, 2002, v-xiii
- Adrian Wright, Foreign Country: The Life of L. P. Hartley, Tauris Parke 2001

== See also ==
- 1953 in literature
- Lists of books
