= Eustace and Hilda =

1947 novel by L.P. Hartley

- First edition
- Author: L.P. Hartley
- Language: English
- Genre: Drama
- Publisher: Putnam
- Publication date: 1947
- Media type: Print

Eustace and Hilda is a 1947 novel by the British writer L.P. Hartley. It was the third in a trilogy of novels, following The Shrimp and the Anemone (1944) and The Sixth Heaven (1946), which are collectively known as the Eustace and Hilda Trilogy.

The novel was widely acclaimed. John Betjeman described it as a social novel in the same class as those of the nineteenth-century writer George Meredith. It was awarded the James Tait Black Memorial Prize for fiction.

The trilogy was filmed as a three-part miniseries by the BBC in 1977, under the title Eustace and Hilda.

== Bibliography ==
- Wright, Adrian. Foreign Country: The Life of L.P. Hartley. I. B. Tauris, 2001.
