= The Will and the Way (novel) =

British novel by L.P. Hartley

- First edition
- Author: L.P. Hartley
- Language: English
- Genre: Drama
- Publisher: Hamish Hamilton
- Publication date: 1973
- Media type: Print

The Will and the Way is a 1973 novel by the British writer L.P. Hartley. It was his final novel, published posthumously following his death in 1972.

== Bibliography ==
- Wright, Adrian. Foreign Country: The Life of L.P. Hartley. I. B. Tauris, 2001.
