= I Still See You (song) =

Single by Scott Walker
- B-side: "My Way Home"
- Released: October 3, 1971
- Recorded: 1970
- Genre: Pop, baroque pop
- Length: 3:15
- Label: Philips Records
- Songwriter(s): Michel Legrand, Hal Sharper
- Producer(s): John Franz

Scott Walker singles chronology
"Lights of Cincinnati" (1968)	"I Still See You" (1971)	"The Me I Never Knew" (1973)

"I Still See You" is a song written by Michel Legrand with lyrics by Hal Sharper which was first a song for the American singer-songwriter Scott Walker in 1971. The song was Walker's fourth solo single in the UK. The song was produced by John Franz with Bob Cornford credited as musical director. The song was the love theme for the 1970 British romantic drama film The Go-Between, directed by Joseph Losey.

Walker's recording of "I Still See You" failed to chart, his first to miss the UK Singles Chart since the Walker Brothers' début "Pretty Girls Everywhere" in 1965.

The single is notable for including one of Walker's few non-album b-sides, "My Way Home". Scott Walker did not record another original composition for another seven years. The production and musical direction of the b-side was also credited to John Franz and Bob Cornford respectively.

== Track listing ==
Philips – 6006 168
No.	Title	Writer(s)	Length
1.	"I Still See You" (Love theme from the film The Go-Between)	Sharper, Legrand	3:15
2.	"My Way Home"	S. Engel, Ady Semel	3:28
