= The Travelling Grave and Other Stories =

- Dust-jacket illustration by Frank Utpatel for The Travelling Grave and Other Stories
- Author: L. P. Hartley
- Cover artist: Frank Utpatel
- Language: English
- Genre: fantasy, horror
- Publisher: Arkham House
- Publication date: 1948
- Publication place: United States
- Media type: Print (hardback)
- Pages: 235 pp

The Travelling Grave and Other Stories is a collection of horror and fantasy short stories by author L. P. Hartley. It was released in 1948 and was the author's first American collection of fantastic tales. It was published by Arkham House in an edition of 2,047 copies.

Most of the stories had originally appeared in two British collections: Night Fears and The Killing Bottle and Other Stories.

== Contents ==
The Travelling Grave and Other Stories contains the following tales:

1. "A Visitor from Down Under"
2. "Podolo"
3. "Three, or Four, for Dinner"
4. "The Travelling Grave"
5. "Feet Foremost"
6. "The Cotillon"
7. "A Change of Ownership"
8. "The Thought"
9. "Conrad and the Dragon"
10. "The Island"
11. "Night Fears"
12. "The Killing Bottle"

== Reprints ==
- London: James Barrie, 1951.
- London: Hamish Hamilton, 1957.
