= The Go-Between (1971 film) =

1971 British film directed by Joseph Losey

- Original British quad format poster
- Directed by: Joseph Losey
- Screenplay by: Harold Pinter
- Based on: The Go-Between (1953 novel) by L. P. Hartley
- Produced by: John Heyman; Norman Priggen
- Starring: Julie Christie; Alan Bates; Margaret Leighton; Edward Fox; Dominic Guard
- Cinematography: Gerry Fisher
- Edited by: Reginald Beck
- Music by: Michel Legrand
- Production company: EMI Films; World Film Services; Columbia Pictures; Associated British Pictures
- Distributed by: MGM-EMI Film Distributors
- Release dates: 25 May 1971 (Cannes); 23 September 1971 (London); 1 October 1971 (United Kingdom)
- Running time: 116 minutes
- Country: United Kingdom
- Language: English
- Budget: £532,841

The Go-Between is a 1971 British historical drama film directed by Joseph Losey, adapted by Harold Pinter from the 1953 novel by L. P. Hartley. It stars Julie Christie, Alan Bates, Margaret Leighton, Edward Fox, Dominic Guard, and Michael Redgrave. Mostly set around 1900, the film exposes the psychologically destructive effects of the rigid class conventions in Great Britain.

The film premiered at the 1971 Cannes Film Festival, where it won the Palme d'Or. At the 25th British Academy Film Awards, the film won in four categories (out of 12 total nominations, including Best Film), including Best Actor in a Supporting Role for Fox and Best Actress in a Supporting Role for Leighton. It also brought Leighton the only Oscar nomination of her career, for Best Supporting Actress.

In 1999, The Go-Between was included on the British Film Institute's list of its 100 best British films.

== Plot ==
In 1900, 12-year-old Leo Colston is invited to spend his summer holiday at Brandham Hall, the Norfolk country house of his wealthy school friend, Marcus Maudsley. Upon arriving at the house, the middle-class Leo finds himself out of place among the upper class; his hosts, particularly Marcus's older sister Marian, try to make him feel welcome. Leo soon develops a crush on the beautiful Marian, who dotes on the boy and buys him new clothes.

Marcus becomes ill with the measles and has to stay quarantined in his bedroom, leaving Leo to entertain himself. While exploring the estate grounds, Leo wanders to a nearby farm and injures himself playing in one of the haystacks. Tenant farmer Ted Burgess tends to Leo's injury, asking the boy if he can bring a letter to Marian for him in return. Leo agrees and after he gives Marian the letter, she begs him to take another letter back to Ted. Leo becomes the regular messenger between Marian and Ted, who are engaged in a clandestine affair. Leo remains innocent about the proceedings and believes he is merely carrying secret messages between friends.

Marian is not free to marry Ted; she is being courted by Hugh, Viscount Trimingham, the estate heir whom her parents want her to marry. One day, Leo sneaks a look at one of the letters Marian has entrusted him with. Leo is shocked and upset when he realizes it is a love note. Marian's engagement to Hugh is announced and Leo is relieved, thinking this means his messenger duties will no longer be needed. Marian and Ted continue their affair and proceed to rely on Leo as a go-between, much to the boy's worry and confusion. When Leo declines to carry a letter for Marian, she brutally scolds him, viciously reminding him of his inferior status. Leo writes to his mother asking if he can come home sooner than planned because he has overstayed his welcome; his mother responds that it would be rude to the Maudsleys if he left early.

The day of Leo's 13th birthday party is marked by a record heatwave. Tensions between Marian and Leo have subsided, and she asks the youth to deliver another letter to Ted for her. Leo refuses and the two playfully chase each other outside. Madeleine, Marian's mother, sees them and inquires what the fuss is about. She spots the letter, but Marian lies and says she is sending Leo to deliver a letter to her former nanny, which Leo goes along with. Madeleine, suspecting Marian's affair, goes to speak alone with Leo. She prods the boy to show her the letter, but he claims he has lost it.

During Leo's birthday dinner that evening, a thunderstorm breaks out. All of the Maudsley family members are at the dinner table to partake in the festivities, except for Marian. Though some family members insist on waiting for her, Madeleine loses her patience and goes to look for Marian herself, taking Leo along with her. She takes him to Ted's farm, where Marian and Ted are discovered having sex in the barn. The event has a long-lasting impact on Leo, as it is revealed that after he was caught with Marian, Ted shot and killed himself in his farmhouse kitchen.

50 years later, in 1950, Leo has returned to Brandham Hall a jaded, disillusioned man. In the years since, he has shut down his imaginative and emotional nature, making him unable to establish intimate relationships. He meets with the elderly Marian, now the Dowager Lady Trimingham, who is living in her former nanny's cottage. Leo learns that Marian went on to marry Hugh as planned but bore Ted's son. Hugh eventually acknowledged Ted's son as his own, before dying in 1910. Marian's son in turn died in the Second World War. Marian has become estranged from her grandson because of the scandal of his parentage, so she has once again sent for Leo as a go-between to help repair their relationship and inform her grandson that she did truly love Ted. Leo leaves to embark on his final errand for Marian.

== Cast ==
- Julie Christie as Marian Maudsley (later Lady Trimingham)
- Edward Fox as Viscount Trimingham
- Alan Bates as Ted Burgess
- Margaret Leighton as Mrs. Maudsley
- Dominic Guard as Leo Colston
  - Michael Redgrave as adult Leo
- Michael Gough as Mr. Maudsley
- Richard Gibson as Marcus Maudsley
- Simon Hume-Kendall as Denys
- Roger Lloyd-Pack as Charles
- Amaryllis Garnett as Kate

== Production ==
=== Development ===
The rights to the novel had been in the hands of many producers, including Anthony Asquith. Then Sir Alexander Korda purchased it in 1956. He envisioned Alec Guinness and Margaret Leighton in the leads and employed Nancy Mitford to write a script. Hartley later said Korda had no intention to make a film of the book; he kept the rights hoping to re-sell them at a profit. Hartley says "I was so annoyed when I heard of this that I put a curse on him and he died, almost the next morning."

Joseph Losey was interested in filming the novel. He tried to get financing for a version in 1963 after filming The Servant and said Pinter had written "two-thirds of a script, but could not find the money to make the film either then or at a second attempt in 1968.

"The company had cold feet about the story", said Losey. "It was too tame for the pornographic age. As one man put it, who would be interested in a bit of Edwardian nostalgia? That's idiotic. It is certainly not a romantic or sentimental piece. It has a surface and a coating of romantic melodrama, but it has a bitter core."

Losey said he was attracted to the novel because it was about "the terrible sense of shortness of any human life, the sense of totality of life."

Pinter's screenplay for the film was his final collaboration with Losey, following The Servant (1963), and Accident (1967). It is largely faithful to the novel, but it alludes to the novel's opening events in dialogue, in which Leo is admired by other boys at his school as they believe he used black magic to punish two bullies, and it moves events described in the novel's epilogue into the central narrative.

Losey later said he was glad he and Pinter did not make the film until after Accident because that film encouraged them to experiment with time in storytelling.

=== Financing ===
Eventually John Heyman managed to get financing from EMI Films, where Bryan Forbes agreed to pay £75,000 for the script. Nat Cohen at EMI also took credit for developing the film. Bernard Delfont claims "for some reason the treatment came to me initially and I passed it on to Bryan with a heartfelt recommendation to give it priority.

The film was a co-production by EMI and MGM. Losey budgeted the film for $2.4 million but had to make it for $1.2 million; he did this by cutting the shooting schedule by a month and working for a percentage of the profits instead of a fee.

In July 1970, MGM-EMI announced it would make the film as part of four co-productions; the others were Get Carter (1971), The Boy Friend (1971) and The Last Run (1971) directed by John Boorman.

=== Filming ===
Filming started in August 1970. The film was shot at Melton Constable Hall, the village of Heydon, and Norwich in Norfolk. The parish church, the churchyard, and the cottage where the older Marian lives are in Heydon, but the sports field used for the cricket match is in nearby Thornage. Filming was completed that November.

Pinter was on set during filming. Losey said the making of the film was one of the happier in his career. Dominic Guard struggled with a stammer that made his delivering his lines impossible at times and that caused him to develop nervous tics. Losey dealt with this problem by coaching Guard and telling him he had faith in him, but in "a rather brutal way" by telling him to stop whenever Guard was using a tic or stammer.

=== Music ===
“Michel Legrand’s driving music for The Go-Between is one of the all-time best film scores, as important in its way as Bernard Herrmann’s score for Hitchcock’s Vertigo (1958)—it adds emotion where it is sorely needed.”— Critic Dan Callahan in Senses of Cinema

Richard Rodney Bennett was announced as the composer. However Bennett's score was rejected and Michel Legrand ended up composing the score for the film. The main theme later was used as the title music for the French "true crime" documentary series Faites entrer l'accusé (in French Wikipedia). The score was also adapted and re-orchestrated by Marcelo Zarvos for Todd Haynes' film May December.

The love theme "I Still See You", written by Legrand with lyrics by Hal Sharper, was performed by Scott Walker and released as a single in late 1971.

== Release ==
The film was first shown in May 1971 at the Cannes Film Festival, and it won the Grand Prix International du Festival. A few days before, James Aubrey, head of MGM, disliked the final film and regarded it a flop.

The film was released in the UK on 24 September 1971, opening at ABC1 on Shaftesbury Avenue in London. A month later, on 29 October, Queen Elizabeth, the Queen Mother arrived at the ABC Cinema on Prince of Wales Road in Norwich to attend the local premiere, thus giving Norwich its first royal premiere.

EMI sold this movie and Tales of Beatrix Potter to China for release at $16,000 each. They were the first western films to be released in China for two decades.

=== 2019 restoration ===
The inaugural screening of a new restoration of the film released by StudioCanal UK took place at Cinema City, Norwich on 11 September 2019.

== Reception ==
=== Box office ===
By August 1971, Nat Cohen stated the film had already been "contracted" for $1 million. The film was one of the most popular movies of 1972 at the British box office. By September 1972, James Aubrey of MGM said the film lost Columbia $200,000, but he insisted that selling the film had been the right move. In 1973 Losey said the film was still not in profit.

According to a biography of Losey, after 18 months of release, the net takings in the UK were £232,249. At 1 July 1972, Columbia's territories had earned $2,198,382, including $1,581,972 in the U.S. and Canada. Ten years after its premiere. the film had earned £290,888 from UK cinemas and TV, £204,566 from overseas sales (excluding the U.S.), £96,599 from the British Film Fund, and Columbia's gross receipts in the U.S., Canada and France were £1,375,300. Losey's personal percentage of film's box office was £39,355. So in the end, the film was quite profitable.

The Go-Between was one of the most successful films from Bryan Forbes' time at EMI. In 1994, Forbes claimed the film had made a profit.

Delfont wrote "the film was sheer joy... not by any means a blockbuster but it was lavishly praised by the critics and warmly received by the sort of audiences who had almost given up their local cinema as a lost cause."

=== Initial critical response ===
In The New York Times, Vincent Canby described the film as "one of the loveliest, and one of the most perfectly formed, set and acted films we're likely to see this year". Roger Ebert awarded the film 3 1/2 stars out of 4, praising the production detail and Losey and Pinter's attention to the "small nuances of class". Ebert did criticize the film's use of flashforwards near the end, expressing that they prematurely give away the ending. In The Village Voice, Andrew Sarris praised the film's cast, period detail, and camera work. However, Sarris also found issue with the film's incorporation of flashforward scenes, which he said made for a jarring, unnecessarily convoluted narrative. He further expressed that some crucial details from Hartley's book are lost in the transition to the screen.

=== Retrospective appraisal ===
"It is fantastic the degree to which the English class structure influences practically every Englishman's life, either in rebellion against it, or acceptance of it, or simply through their being gotten at by it without realizing it, and sometimes whilst violently protesting that they're not.” - Joseph Losey in The Cinema of Joseph Losey.

In 1985, Joanne Klein wrote that she saw the filmscript "as a major stylistic and technical advance in Pinter's work for the screen", and in 1980, Foster Hirsch described it as "one of the world’s great films". In 2009, Emanuel Levy called the film "Losey's masterpiece".

In 1999, The Go-Between was included on the British Film Institute's list of its 100 best British films.

Robert Maras at the World Socialist Web Site called The Go-Between "[A] devastating critique of bourgeois morality and the British social order."

On review aggregate website Rotten Tomatoes, The Go-Between has an approval rating of 100% collected from 11 reviews, with an average score of 8.6/10.

Filmink argued the movie "seemed to inspire a lot of Australian period movies in the 1970s."

=== Accolades ===
Award	Date of ceremony	Category	Nominee(s)	Result	Ref.
Academy Awards	10 April 1972	Best Supporting Actress	Margaret Leighton	Nominated	
British Academy Film Awards	1972	Best Film		Nominated	
British Academy Film Awards	1972	Best Direction	Joseph Losey	Nominated	
British Academy Film Awards	1972	Best Actress in a Leading Role	Julie Christie	Nominated	
British Academy Film Awards	1972	Best Actor in a Supporting Role	Edward Fox	Won	
British Academy Film Awards	1972	Best Actor in a Supporting Role	Michael Gough	Nominated	
British Academy Film Awards	1972	Best Actress in a Supporting Role	Margaret Leighton	Won	
British Academy Film Awards	1972	Best Screenplay	Harold Pinter	Won	
British Academy Film Awards	1972	Best Art Direction	Carmen Dillon	Nominated	
British Academy Film Awards	1972	Best Cinematography	Gerry Fisher	Nominated	
British Academy Film Awards	1972	Best Costume Design	John Furniss	Nominated	
British Academy Film Awards	1972	Best Soundtrack	Garth Craven, Peter Handford, and Hugh Strain	Nominated	
British Academy Film Awards	1972	Most Promising Newcomer to Leading Film Roles	Dominic Guard	Won	
Cannes Film Festival	2 – 27 May 1971	Grand Prix International du Festival	Joseph Losey	Won	
Golden Globe Awards	6 February 1972	Best Foreign Film – English-Language	Joseph Losey	Nominated	
Kansas City Film Critics Circle	1971	Best Supporting Actress	Margaret Leighton	Won	
National Board of Review	3 January 1972	Top Ten Films		7th Place	
Writers' Guild of Great Britain	17 February 1972	Best British Screenplay	Harold Pinter	Won	

== See also ==
- BFI Top 100 British films
- 1971 in film
- List of British films of 1971
- Bibliography for Harold Pinter

== Works cited ==
- Billington, Michael (1997). The Life and Work of Harold Pinter (2nd ed.). London: Faber and Faber. ISBN 978-0-571-23476-9.
- Callahan, Dan (March 2003). "Losey, Joseph". Senses of Cinema. No. 25.
- Caute, David (1994). Joseph Losey. Oxford University Press. ISBN 978-0195064100.
- Forbes, Bryan (1993). A Divided Life – Memoirs. Mandarin Publishing. ISBN 978-0-749-30884-1.
- Gale, Steven H., ed. (2001). The Films of Harold Pinter. Albany, New York: State University of New York Press. ISBN 978-0-791-44931-8.
- Gale, Steven H. (2003). Sharp Cut – Harold Pinter's Screenplays and the Artistic Process. Lexington, Kentucky: University Press of Kentucky. ISBN 978-0-813-12244-1.
- Hartop, Christopher (2011). Norfolk Summer: Making The Go-Between. Cambridge: John Adamson. ISBN 978-1-898565-07-9.
- Hirsch, Foster (1980). Joseph Losey. Boston, Massachusetts: Twayne Publishers. ISBN 0-8057-9257-0.
- Maras, Robert (28 May 2012). "Dissecting class relations: The film collaborations of Joseph Losey and Harold Pinter". World Socialist Web Site.
- Palmer, James; Riley, Michael (1993). The Films of Joseph Losey. Cambridge, England: Cambridge University Press. ISBN 0-521-38386-2.
