= List of Brazilian films of the 1950s =

An incomplete list of films produced in Brazil in the 1950s. For an alphabetical list of films currently on Wikipedia see Category:Brazilian films

Title	Director	Cast	Genre	Notes
1950
Alameda da Saudade 113	Carlos Ortiz	Lídia Alencar, Dolores Alvarez, Conceição Andrade, Sonia Coelho, Maria de Lourdes Lebert	Drama	
Anjo do Lodo				
Aviso aos Navegantes				
Caraça, Porta do Céu	Theodor Luts			
Caiçara				
Morning Star	Osvaldo de Oliveira	Doris Duranti, Paulo Gracindo, Dulce Nunes	Drama	
Somos Dois				
Todos Por Um				
1951
Agüenta Firme, Isidoro				
Aí Vem o Barão				

Title	Director	Cast	Genre	Notes
1952
Amei um bicheiro				
Apassionata				
Areias Ardentes				
Areião				
João Gangorra				
Nadando em Dinheiro				
Quo Vadis				
Sai da frente				
Tico-Tico no Fubá				
Veneno				
Song of the Sea	Alberto Cavalcanti			Entered into the 1954 Cannes Film Festival
1953
Agulha no Palheiro				
O Cangaceiro	Lima Barreto			Entered into the 1953 Cannes Film Festival
O Craque				
A Dupla do Barulho				
A Família Lero-Lero				
O Homem Dos Papagaios				
The Landowner's Daughter	Tom Payne, Oswaldo Sampaio			Entered into the 4th Berlin International Film Festival
Stalag 17				
Uma Pulga na Balança				
O Saci	Rodolfo Nanni	Paulo Matozinho Olga Maria Aristéia Paula de Souza Lívio Nanni Maria Rosa Ribeiro Otávio Araújo Benedita Rodrigues Mário Meneguelli Yara Trexler Meninos de Ribeirão Bonito		
1954
Candinho				
Carnaval em Caxias				
Chamas no cafezal				
Floradas na Serra				
O Petróleo é Nosso				
A Sogra				
Feitiço do Amazonas	Zygmunt Sulistrowski			Entered into the 1954 Cannes Film Festival
1955
Almas em Conflito				
Ana				
Angu de Caroço				
Armas da Vingança				
Carnaval em Marte				
Carnaval em Lá Maior				
Colégio de Brotos				
Genival Trabalhou Bem				
Três Garimpeiros				
Rosas no Céu, Milagres na Terra				
1956
Depois Eu Conto				
Fuzileiro do Amor				
Sob o Céu da Bahia	Ernesto Remani			Entered into the 1956 Cannes Film Festival
1957
Absolutamente Certo				
Arara Vermelha				
Cara de Fogo	Galileu Garcia			Entered into the 1st Moscow International Film Festival
Com Jeito Vai				
De Vento em Popa				
Uma Certa Lucrécia				
Um Peão Para Todo Serviço				
1958
Alegria de Viver				
Agüenta o Rojão				
Além do Rios das Mortes				
Amor Para Três				
Anatomia do Progresso				
O Cantor e o Milionário				
O Camelô da Rua Larga				
O Grande Momento				
Sina de Aventureiro	José Mojica Marins	José Mojica Marins	Western	
Sentença de Deus	José Mojica Marins	José Mojica Marins	Western	
1959
Black Orpheus	Marcel Camus			Won the Palme d'Or at the 1959 Cannes Film Festival
Aí Vêm os Cadetes				
Maria 38				
Moral em Concordata				
Three Loves in Rio	Carlos Hugo Christensen			Entered into the 9th Berlin International Film Festival
