= 3rd Berlin International Film Festival =

1953 film festival in West Berlin, Germany

- Festival poster
- Location: West Berlin, Germany
- Founded: 1951
- Awards: Golden Bear: The Wages of Fear
- Festival date: 18–28 June 1953
- Website: Website

Berlin International Film Festival chronology
- 4th 2nd

The 3rd annual Berlin International Film Festival was held from 18 to 28 June 1953.

The Golden Bear was awarded to The Wages of Fear by the audience vote. Since 1952, the FIAPF had prohibit the festival from awarding any prizes by an official jury (which in the early 50's only Cannes and Venice were allowed to do so), instead the awards were given through audience voting until 1956.

During this edition the first replica of the Bär, created by sculptor Renée Sintenis, produced by the Noack Foundry, was presented and awarded.

The festival held a retrospective on silent films.

== Main Competition ==
The following films were in competition for the Golden Bear award:

English title	Original title	Director(s)	Country
The Boy Kumasenu		Sean Graham	Ghana
O Cangaceiro		Lima Barreto	Brazil
The City Stands Trial	Processo alla città	Luigi Zampa	Italy
Fight of the Tertia	Der Kampf der Tertia	Erik Ode	West Germany
Green Magic	Magia verde	Gian Gaspare Napolitano	Italy, Brazil
A Heart Plays False	Ein Herz spielt falsch	Rudolf Jugert	West Germany
Hell Raiders of the Deep	I sette dell'Orsa maggiore	Duilio Coletti	Italy
Man on a Tightrope		Elia Kazan	United States
In Olden Days	Altri tempi	Alessandro Blasetti	Italy
Sword for Hire	戦国無頼	Hiroshi Inagaki	Japan
Les Vacances de Monsieur Hulot		Jacques Tati	France
The Village	Sie fanden eine Heimat	Leopold Lindtberg	Switzerland, United Kingdom
The Wages of Fear	Le Salaire de la peur	Henri-Georges Clouzot	France, Italy
Where Chimneys Are Seen	煙突の見える場所	Heinosuke Gosho	Japan

== Official Awards ==
The following prizes were awarded by audience votes:

- Golden Bear: The Wages of Fear by Henri-Georges Clouzot
- Silver Bear: Green Magic by Gian Gaspare Napolitano
- Bronze Berlin Bear: The Village by Leopold Lindtberg
