= Lights Out (1953 film) =

1953 film directed by Carlos Thiré

- Directed by: Carlos Thiré
- Written by: Carlos Thiré
- Produced by: Dino Badessi
- Cinematography: Robert Huke
- Edited by: Landislau Babuska; Oswald Hafenrichter
- Music by: Enrico Simonetti
- Production company: Vera Cruz Studios
- Distributed by: Columbia Pictures do Brasil
- Release date: 1953
- Running time: 90 minutes
- Country: Brazil
- Language: Portuguese

Lights Out (Portuguese: Luz Apagada) is a 1953 Brazilian drama film directed by Carlos Thiré and starring Mário Sergio, Maria Fernanda and Fernando Pereira.

== Cast ==
- Mário Sergio
- Maria Fernanda as Glória
- Fernando Pereira
- Xandó Batista
- Erminio Spalla
- Sérgio Hingst
- Helena Barreto Leite
- Nelson Camargo
- Victor Merinow
- Luciano Pessoa
- Antônio Coelho
- David Novach
- Araújo Salles
- Lourenço Ferreira
- Sérgio Britto
- Léa Camargo
- Abigail Costa
- Ray Endsleigh
- Luiz Francunha
- Gilza Gabindo
- Leo Godoy
- Jorge Goulart
- Robert Huke
- Luiz Linhares (voice)
- Raul Luciano
- Pierino Massenzi
- Paulo Monte
- Geraldo Santos Pereira
- Olívia Pineschi
- João Ribas
- Renato Pacheco e Silva
- Carlos Thiré
- Sergio Warnovsky

== Bibliography ==
- Cláudio da Costa. Cinema brasileiro, anos 60-70: dissimetria, oscilação e simulacro. 7Letras, 2000.
