= Oswald Hafenrichter =

Austrian-British film editor

- Born: Oswald Eduard Hafenrichter; 10 April 1899; Oplotnica, Duchy of Styria, Austria-Hungary
- Died: 18 May 1973 (age 74); Hounslow, London, England
- Citizenship: United Kingdom
- Occupation: Film editor
- Years active: 1931–1973
- Spouse: Edith E. Burbeck (m. 1938)

Oswald Eduard Hafenrichter (10 April 1899 – 18 May 1973) was an Austrian-British film editor with more than seventy feature film credits. He was nominated for the Academy Award for Best Film Editing for The Third Man (1949). He has been called "one of the most important foreign editors to have worked in Britain."

== Biography ==
Hafenrichter was born to George and Friedericka Hafenrichter in Oplotniz, Duchy of Styria (today Oplotnica, Slovenia). In the first half of the 1920s, he studied medicine in Graz and Vienna then moved to Berlin, where he became an editor at UFA GmbH in 1926.

A member of the Communist Party of Germany (KPD), Hafenrichter fell under the radar of the Nazi Party in the 1930s, when he was arrested multiple times. He moved to Vienna, where he met the Italian director and producer Carmine Gallone. He worked on his film Al sole (1936) in Austria, and then followed him back to Italy. He edited ten of Gallone's films, remaining in Rome until 1940, when he fled first to France and then the United Kingdom. Allowed in as a communist refugee from the Nazis, he worked for the Ministry of Information editing propaganda films.

He joined Sir Alexander Korda's London Films after the war, when foreigners were again allowed to work in feature films, and also worked for Carol Reed. His post-war films included An Ideal Husband (1947), The Fallen Idol (1948), and The Third Man (1949), receiving a nomination for Academy Award for Best Film Editing for the latter at the 23rd Academy Awards.

In 1950, Hafenrichter edited the first of more than 20 Brazilian films, mostly for the Vera Cruz production company. He returned to England in 1957, and then alternated between Italy and England for the rest of his career, which ended with his death in 1973. He had been editing a series of Hammer horror films. He was fired from editing Blood from the Mummy's Tomb.

== Personal life ==
In 1948, he married Londoner Edith Ellen Burbeck (1918–2000). She shared several editing credits on Brazilian films with her husband, and she was the sole editor on several English films after their return to England. They had sons Conrad (1949), Stephen (1955), and Roland (1960). Oswald Hafenrichter died in Hounslow in May 1973 after a long illness.

== Selected filmography ==
Credited as the editor except as noted.

- Mädchen in Uniform (1931)
- Gitta Discovers Her Heart (1932)
- Viennese Waltz (1932)
- Love at First Sight (1932)
- The Hymn of Leuthen (1933)
- Financial Opportunists (1934)
- The Green Domino (1935)
- Punks Arrives from America (1935)
- Thank You, Madame (1936)
- Scipio Africanus: The Defeat of Hannibal (1937)
- Mother Song (1937)
- Giuseppe Verdi (1938)
- The Dream of Butterfly (1939)
- Marionette (1939)
- Beyond Love (1940)
- Love Me, Alfredo! (1940)
- An Ideal Husband (1947)
- The Fallen Idol (1948)
- The Third Man (1949)
- The Happiest Days of Your Life (1950)
- Caiçara (1950)
- Sai da frente (1952)
- O Cangaceiro (Montage, 1953)
- The Lero-Lero Family (1953)
- A Flea on the Scales (1953)
- Lights Out (1953)
- Floradas na Serra (1954)
- A Estrada (1956)
- The Smallest Show on Earth (1957)
- Faces in the Dark (1960)
- The Hands of Orlac (1960)
- The Guns of Navarone (Associate Editor, 1961).
- The Brain (1962)
- Traitor's Gate (1964)
- Danger Route (1967)
- Trog (1970)
- The Creeping Flesh (1973)
- The Vault of Horror (1973)
