= Sinhá Moça =

Sinhá Moça may refer to:

- Sinhá Moça (novel), a 1950 novel
- The Landowner's Daughter (Portuguese: Sinhá Moça), a 1953 Brazilian drama film and adaptation of the novel
- Sinhá Moça (1986 TV series), an adaptation of the novel
- Sinhá Moça (2006 TV series), an adaptation of the novel
