= Eliane Lage =

French-born Brazilian actress (born 1928)

- Born: Eliane Margaret Elizabeth Lage; 16 July 1928 (age 98); Paris, France
- Occupation: Actress
- Years active: 1950–1958
- Spouse: Tom Payne (m. 1951; div. 1966)
- Children: 3

Eliane Margaret Elizabeth Lage (born 16 July 1928) is a French-born Brazilian actress and writer, best known for playing the lead role in the 1953 film The Landowner's Daughter.

== Life and career ==
Lage was born on 16 July 1928, in Paris, France. Her father was Brazilian and her mother was English. She came to Brazil when she was six months old. From a young age, she began working with underprivileged children, mainly in Dona Marta Favela. Dissatisfied with her limitations, she went to study in England, and from there she went to Greece, where she helped in a concentration camp for Greek children during the civil war.

Back in Brazil in 1950, she was invited by Tom Payne to audition for the film Caiçara. After the success of Caiçara, Tom convinced her to film Ângela in Pelotas. It was the beginning of his brief, but very important film career. Soon came the consecration, in Sinhá Moça (1953), which earned Tom Payne a critic's prize at the 4th Berlin International Film Festival and international acclaim.

In 1957, she and Tom Payne did a short-lived weekly programme, A Vida com Eliane, on TV Tupi, an experience she found disappointing, and she never wanted to do television again.

== Personal life ==
After all the artistic career, Eliane married Tom Payne in 1951, they divorced in 1966. They had three children, two daughters and a son. Payne died in 1996. She used to live in Rio, São Paulo, Guarujá and Petrópolis. Since 2008 Eliane lives in Pirenópolis, Goiás. She wrote an autobiography, Ilhas, Veredas e Buritis, published in 2005 by Brasiliense.

== Filmography ==
- Caiçara (1950)
- Ângela (1951)
- Terra É Sempre Terra (1951)
- The Landowner's Daughter (1953)
- Ravina (1958)
