= O Pagador de Promessas =

1962 Brazilian film directed by Anselmo Duarte

- Original poster in Portuguese
- Directed by: Anselmo Duarte
- Written by: Anselmo Duarte
- Based on: O Pagador de Promessas by Dias Gomes
- Produced by: Oswaldo Massaini
- Starring: Leonardo Villar; Glória Menezes; Norma Bengell; Dionísio Azevedo
- Cinematography: H. E. Fowle
- Edited by: Carlos Coimbra
- Music by: Gabriel Migliori
- Production company: Cinedistri
- Distributed by: Cinedistri; Embrafilme
- Release date: August 6, 1962
- Running time: 91 minutes
- Country: Brazil
- Language: Portuguese

O Pagador de Promessas (Brazilian Portuguese pronunciation: [u paɡaˈdoʁ dʒi pɾoˈmɛsɐs]; Keeper of Promises) (Note: The title translates literally as The Payer of Promises, but the film has been known by several other names in the English-speaking world, such as Keeper of Promises, The Given Word and The Promise.) is a 1962 Brazilian drama film written and directed by Anselmo Duarte, based on the stage play of the same name by Dias Gomes. Shot in Salvador, Bahia, it stars Leonardo Villar and Glória Menezes.

The film won the Palme d'Or at the 1962 Cannes Film Festival, becoming the first and only Brazilian film to achieve that feat. A year later, it also became the first Brazilian and South American film to be nominated for Best Foreign Language Film at the 35th Academy Awards.

In 2015, the Brazilian Film Critics Association aka Abraccine voted Keeper of Promises the 9th greatest Brazilian film of all time, in its list of the 100 best Brazilian films.

== Plot ==
Zé do Burro (Leonardo Villar) is a landowner from Nordeste. His best friend is a donkey. When his donkey falls terminally ill, Zé promises to a Candomblé orisha, Iansan, that if his donkey recovers, he will give away his land to the poor and carry a cross all the way from his farm to the Saint Bárbara Church in Salvador, Bahia, where he will offer the cross to the local priest. Upon the recovery of his donkey, Zé leaves on his journey, covering a distance of 7 léguas (46 km; 29 miles). The movie begins as Zé, followed by his wife Rosa (Glória Menezes), arrives outside the church. The local priest (Dionísio Azevedo) refuses to accept the cross once he hears about Zé's "pagan" pledge and the reasons behind it. Everyone attempts to manipulate the innocent and naive Zé. The local Candomblé worshippers want to use him as a leader against the discrimination they suffer from the Roman Catholic Church. The sensationalist newspapers transform his promise to give away his land into a "communist" call for land reform (which remains a highly controversial issue in Brazil). When Zé is shot by the police to prevent his entry into the church, the Candomblé worshippers place his dead body on the cross and force their way into the church.

== Main cast ==
- Leonardo Villar as Zé do Burro (Donkey Jack)
- Glória Menezes as Rosa, Zé's wife
- Dionísio Azevedo as Olavo, the priest
- Geraldo Del Rey as Bonitão (Handsome), a pimp
- Norma Bengell as Marly, a prostitute
- Othon Bastos as the Reporter
- Antônio Pitanga as Coca, the capoeira player

== Awards and nominations ==
35th Academy Awards

- Best Foreign Language Film (nominated)

1962 Cannes Film Festival

- Palme d'Or – Anselmo Duarte (won)

Cartagena Film Festival

- Special Jury Prize – Anselmo Duarte (won)

San Francisco International Film Festival

- Golden Gate Award for Best Film – Anselmo Duarte (won)
- Golden Gate Award for Best Musical Score – Gabriel Migliori (won)

== See also ==
- List of submissions to the 35th Academy Awards for Best Foreign Language Film
- List of Brazilian submissions for the Academy Award for Best Foreign Language Film
