= Ricardo Campos =

Ricardo Campos may refer to:

- Ricardo Campos (footballer, born 1985), Mozambican association football goalkeeper
- Ricardo Campos da Costa (born 1976), Brazilian association football midfielder
- Ricardo Campos (actor), Brazilian film actor
- Ricardo Campos (field hockey), Cuban field hockey player
- Ricardo Campos (judoka), represented Brazil in judo at the 1975 Pan American Games
- Ricardo Campos, represented Brazil in the 1979 South American Youth Championships in Athletics
- Ricardo Campos, founded Wild Rags record label and store in California

== Similar name ==
- Ricardo Campo (born 1969), Spanish alpine skier
