= Mauro Alice =

Brazilian film editor (1925–2010)

- Born: 1925; Curitiba, Paraná, Brazil
- Died: November 23, 2010 (aged 84); São Paulo, Brazil
- Occupation: Film editor

Mauro Alice (1925 – 23 November 2010) was a prolific Brazilian film editor who between 1952 and 2005 edited nearly 60 films, including Kiss of the Spider Woman (1985), Corazón iluminado (1996) and Carandiru (2003). He was born in Curitiba, Paraná, Brazil and was studying chemistry in Santo André, São Paulo, when he began working in the projection room at the Vera Cruz film studio in São Bernardo do Campo. He worked with some of the most important Brazilian directors, including Amácio Mazzaropi, Watson Macedo, Walter Hugo Khouri, Héctor Babenco and Maurice Capovilla. He won the "Coruja de Ouro" award in 1974 for the editing of “Anjo da Noite”.

== Filmography ==
=== Self ===
- Tangled Web: Making 'Kiss of the Spider Woman' (2008). Documentary about the film's production. Available as an "extra" with DVD releases of the film.

=== Editor ===
- Vinho de Rosas (2005)
- Carandiru (2003)
- Zagati (2003)
- A Bela E os Passaros (2001)
- Até que a Vida nos Separe (1999)
- A Grande Noitada (1997)
- Corazón iluminado (1996)
- Desterro (1991)
- Doida Demais (1989)
- Fogo e Paixão (1988)
- Besame Mucho (1987)
- Kiss of the Spider Woman (1985)
- Made in Brazil (1985)
- Aventuras da Turma da Mônica, As (1982)
- Retrato Falado de uma Mulher Sem Pudor (1982)
- Filhos e Amantes (1981)
- Alucinada Pelo Desejo (1979)
- Jecão... Um Fofoqueiro no Céu (1977)
- Anjo da Noite, O (1974)
- Cangaceiras Eróticas, As (1974)
- Detetive Bolacha Contra o Gênio do Crime, O (1973)
- Um Caipira em Bariloche (1973)
- Noites de Iemanjá (1971)
- Pantanal de Sangue (1971)
- OSS 117 prend des vacances (1970)
- Em Cada Coração um Punhal (1970) (segment "Transplante de Mãe")
- Gatinhas, As (1970)
- Palace of Angels (1970)
- Maré Alta (1968)
- Corpo Ardente, O (1966)
- Grande Sertão, O (1965)
- Puritano da Rua Augusta, O (1965)
- Noite Vazia (1964)
- Imitando o Sol (1964)
- Vereda de Salvação (1964)
- Casinha Pequenina (1963)
- Roteiro dos Pampas (1963)
- Vencidos, Os (1963)
- Vendedor de Lingüiças, O (1962)
- Tristeza do Jeca (1961)
- A Primeira Missa (1961)
- Bruma Seca (1960)
- Jeca Tatu (1960)
- Na Garganta do Diabo (1960)
- Cantor e o Milionário, O (1958)
- Alegria de Viver (1958)
- A Grande Vedete (1958)
- No Mundo da Lua (1958)
- Ravina (1958)
- A Baronesa Transviada (1957)
- Gato de Madame, O (1957)
- Rico Ri à Toa (1957)
- Rio Fantasia (1957)
- Sobrado, O (1956)
- Floradas na Serra (1954)
- A Flea on the Scales (1953)
- Sai da Frente (1952)
