= The Obsessed of Catule =

1965 film

- Theatrical release poster
- Directed by: Anselmo Duarte
- Written by: Jorge Andrade; Anselmo Duarte
- Based on: Vereda da Salvação by Jorge Andrade
- Produced by: Anselmo Duarte
- Starring: Raul Cortez
- Cinematography: Ricardo Aronovich
- Edited by: Mauro Alice
- Music by: Diogo Pacheco
- Production company: Anselmo Duarte Produções
- Distributed by: Cinedistri
- Release date: 1965
- Running time: 100 minutes
- Country: Brazil
- Language: Portuguese

The Obsessed of Catule (Portuguese: Vereda da Salvação) is a 1965 Brazilian drama film directed by Anselmo Duarte. It was entered into the 15th Berlin International Film Festival.

== Cast ==
- Raul Cortez as Joaquim
- José Parisi as Manuel
- Esther Mellinger as Artuliana
- Lélia Abramo as Dolor
- Margarida Cardoso
- Maria Isabel de Lizandra as Ana
- José Pereira as Onofre
- Áurea Campos as Germana
