= Love Slaves of the Amazons =

1957 film by Curt Siodmak

- Film poster by Reynold Brown
- Directed by: Curt Siodmak
- Written by: Curt Siodmak
- Produced by: Curt Siodmak
- Starring: Don Taylor; Gianna Segale; Eduardo Ciannelli
- Cinematography: Mario Pagés
- Edited by: Oswald Hafenrichter; Terry O. Morse
- Color process: Eastmancolor
- Production company: Jewell Productions
- Distributed by: Universal Pictures
- Release date: December 1957
- Running time: 81 minutes
- Country: United States
- Language: English

Love Slaves of the Amazons is a 1957 American adventure film written, produced and directed by Curt Siodmak and starring Don Taylor, Gianna Segale and Eduardo Ciannelli. The film was released on December 6, 1957 on a double bill with The Monolith Monsters (1957).

== Plot ==
Archaeologist Dr. Peter Masters (Don Taylor) engages the old Dr. Crespi (Eduardo Ciannelli) who claims to know a path to a mysterious tribe of amazons in the jungle. After they start their expedition, their boat is attacked by river pirates. They manage to flee from the boat and enter the jungle. There they meet a tribe of female warriors, colored completely in green, wearing green clothing. Peter is brought into their village where he meets Gina, a girl who was lost in the jungle four years before. Four older amazon women now bring a bathing tub into the hut and bath Peter. The other amazons (without green paint) are excited, because they have not seen a young man for a long time.
Peter finds golden treasures from Spanish conquistadores and meets another man, Mario, who tells him that Peter now soon will take his place. Male children are killed at birth, so Mario only has daughters. The amazons used drugs to make him obey, but that also aged him. Minutes later, Mario is killed and the ladies are interested to get their grip on Peter. Peter refuses the drink that is offered, but he inhales smoke and feels comfortable with the circumstances, especially when they dance for him. Queen Conori now approaches Peter.
The pirates enter the jungle and Gina finds Peter unconscious and alone. They flee together and discover the pirates - all killed. Gina and Peter paint themselves green and escape from the jungle. Dr. Crespi finds them with a water plane, but neither Gina nor Peter tell about the amazons. In the last scene they kiss and a smiling green amazon girl is seen in a transition.

== Cast ==
- Don Taylor as Dr. Peter Masters
- Gianna Segale as Gina Vanni
- Eduardo Ciannelli as Dr. Crespi
- Harvey Chalk as Aldemar Silva
- John Herbert as Hotel Clerk
- Wilson Vianna as Fernando (as Wilson Viana)
- Eugenio Carlos as Carlos - Fernando's brother
- Ana Maria Nabuco as Queen Conori
- Tom Payne as Dr. Mario Dellamano
- Gilda Nery as Amazon Guard
- Louis Serrano as Rescue Pilot

== Production ==
The movie was filmed in Eastmancolor, in Brazil, in 1956, along with Curucu, Beast of the Amazon, and used some of the same cast. Curt Siodmak claimed to have made the film because he had 10,000 feet of color film left over from Curucu but could not export the unused film.

== Reception ==
According to an online New York Times review, "You knew what you were in for when you saw the title, so don't grouse."

== See also ==
- List of American films of 1957
