= A Banda das Velhas Virgens =

1979 film directed by Amácio Mazzaropi

- Theatrical Poster
- Directed by: Amácio Mazzaropi; Pio Zamuner
- Written by: Rajá de Aragão
- Screenplay by: Amácio Mazzaropi
- Story by: Amácio Mazzaropi
- Produced by: Amácio Mazzaropi
- Starring: Amácio Mazzaropi; Geny Prado; Renato Restier; André Luiz de Toledo; Cristina Neves
- Cinematography: Pio Zamuner
- Edited by: Walter Wanni
- Music by: Hector Lagna Fietta
- Distributed by: PAM Filmes
- Release date: 1979
- Running time: 100 minutes
- Country: Brazil
- Language: Portuguese

A Banda das Velhas Virgens is a 1979 Brazilian film by Amácio Mazzaropi.

== Plot ==
In this movie, the main character is called 'Gostoso'. He is responsible for a band formed by older women and religious women. Everything goes well until the farmer is expelled, along with his family, off their land. He restarts his life in the capital, collecting scrap, and becomes the main suspect of theft.
