= A Morte Comanda o Cangaço =

1960 film

- Film poster
- Directed by: Carlos Coimbra; Walter Guimarães Motta
- Written by: Carlos Coimbra; Walter Guimarães Motta; Francisco Pereira da Silva
- Produced by: Marcelo de Miranda Torres
- Starring: Alberto Ruschel; Aurora Duarte; Milton Ribeiro
- Cinematography: Tony Rabatoni
- Edited by: Carlos Coimbra
- Music by: Enrico Simonetti
- Production company: Aurora Duarte Produções Cinematográficas
- Distributed by: Cinedistri
- Release date: 28 December 1960
- Running time: 100 minutes
- Country: Brazil
- Language: Portuguese

A Morte Comanda o Cangaço is a 1960 Brazilian Western action film directed and co-written by Carlos Coimbra and Walter Guimarães Motta. Shot in Pernambuco, it stars Alberto Ruschel, Aurora Duarte, and Milton Ribeiro in a fiction about cangaço in the late 19th and early 20th centuries. It was entered into the 11th Berlin International Film Festival. The film was also selected as the Brazilian entry for the Best Foreign Language Film at the 33rd Academy Awards, but was not accepted as a nominee.

== Cast ==
- Alberto Ruschel as Raimundo Vieira
- Aurora Duarte as Florind
- Milton Ribeiro as Capitano Silvero
- Maria Augusta Costa Leite as Dona Cidinha
- Gilberto Marques as Coll. Nesinho
- Ruth de Souza
- Lyris Castellani
- Apolo Monteiro
- Edson França
- José Mercaldi
- Leo de Avelar
- Jean Lafront

== See also ==
- List of submissions to the 33rd Academy Awards for Best Foreign Language Film
- List of Brazilian submissions for the Academy Award for Best Foreign Language Film
