= Tom Toms of Mayumba =

1955 film

- Directed by: Gian Gaspare Napolitano; Folco Quilici
- Written by: Louis Chavance; Daniele D'Anza; Gian Gaspare Napolitano
- Starring: Pedro Armendáriz
- Cinematography: Tino Santoni
- Music by: Angelo Francesco Lavagnino
- Release date: 1955
- Running time: 95 minutes
- Country: Italy
- Language: Italian

Tom Toms of Mayumba (Italian: Tam tam mayumbe) is a 1955 Italian adventure film directed by Gian Gaspare Napolitano.

== Cast ==
- Pedro Armendáriz - Martinez
- Habib Benglia - Gomba
- Jacques Berthier - Clemens Van Waerten
- Kerima - Madalena
- Philippe Lemaire
- Marcello Mastroianni - Alessandrini
- Domenico Meccoli
- Paul Muller - Dr. Assar
- Francine Delore Rhiney - Louise
- Charles Vanel - Carlo Leonardi
