= Green Magic =

1953 film

- Directed by: Gian Gaspare Napolitano
- Written by: Mário Aldrá; Gian Gaspare Napolitano; Alfredo Palácios
- Produced by: Mário Aldrá; Leonardo Bonzi
- Narrated by: Carlos Montalbán; Bret Morrison
- Cinematography: Mario Craveri; Giovanni Raffaldi
- Edited by: José Cañizares; Mario Serandrei
- Distributed by: 20th Century Fox
- Release dates: April 1953 (Cannes Film Festival); 27 August 1953 (Italy)
- Running time: 85 minutes
- Countries: Italy; Brazil
- Language: Italian

Green Magic (Italian: Magia verde) is a 1953 Italian documentary film directed by Gian Gaspare Napolitano.

== Cast ==
- Carlos Montalbán as narrator, US version (voice)
- Bret Morrison as narrator, US version (voice)
- Leonardo Bonzi as himself (Expedition Member)
- Gian Gaspare Napolitano as himself (Expedition Member)
- Mario Craveri as himself (Expedition Member)
- Giovanni Raffaldi as himself (Expedition Member)
- Jose Docarmo as himself (Pilot)

== Awards ==
Won

- 3rd Berlin International Film Festival: Silver Bear

Nominated

- 1953 Cannes Film Festival: Palme d'Or
