= Betão Ronca Ferro =

1970 film

- Directed by: Geraldo Affonso Miranda; Pio Zamuner
- Written by: Kleber Afonso; Tito Di Míglio; Amácio Mazzaropi
- Produced by: Amácio Mazzaropi
- Starring: Amácio Mazzaropi; Geny Prado; Roberto Pirillo; Dina Lisboa
- Cinematography: Pio Zamuner
- Edited by: Glauco Mirko Laurelli
- Music by: Hector Lagna Fietta
- Release date: 1970
- Running time: 100 minutes
- Country: Brazil
- Language: Portuguese

Betão Ronca Ferro is a 1970 Brazilian comedy film directed by Mazzaropi and Geraldo Afonso Miranda.

== Cast ==
- Mazzaropi - Betão
- Dilma Lóes
- Roberto Pirillo
- Geny Prado
- Araken Saldanha
- Tony Vieira
- Diná Lisboa
- Cláudio Roberto Mecchi
- Gilmara Sanches
- Milton Pereira
- Yaratan Lauretta
- Carlos Garcia
- Henricão
- Judith Barbosa
- Rogério Câmara
