= Alberto Ruschel =

Brazilian actor

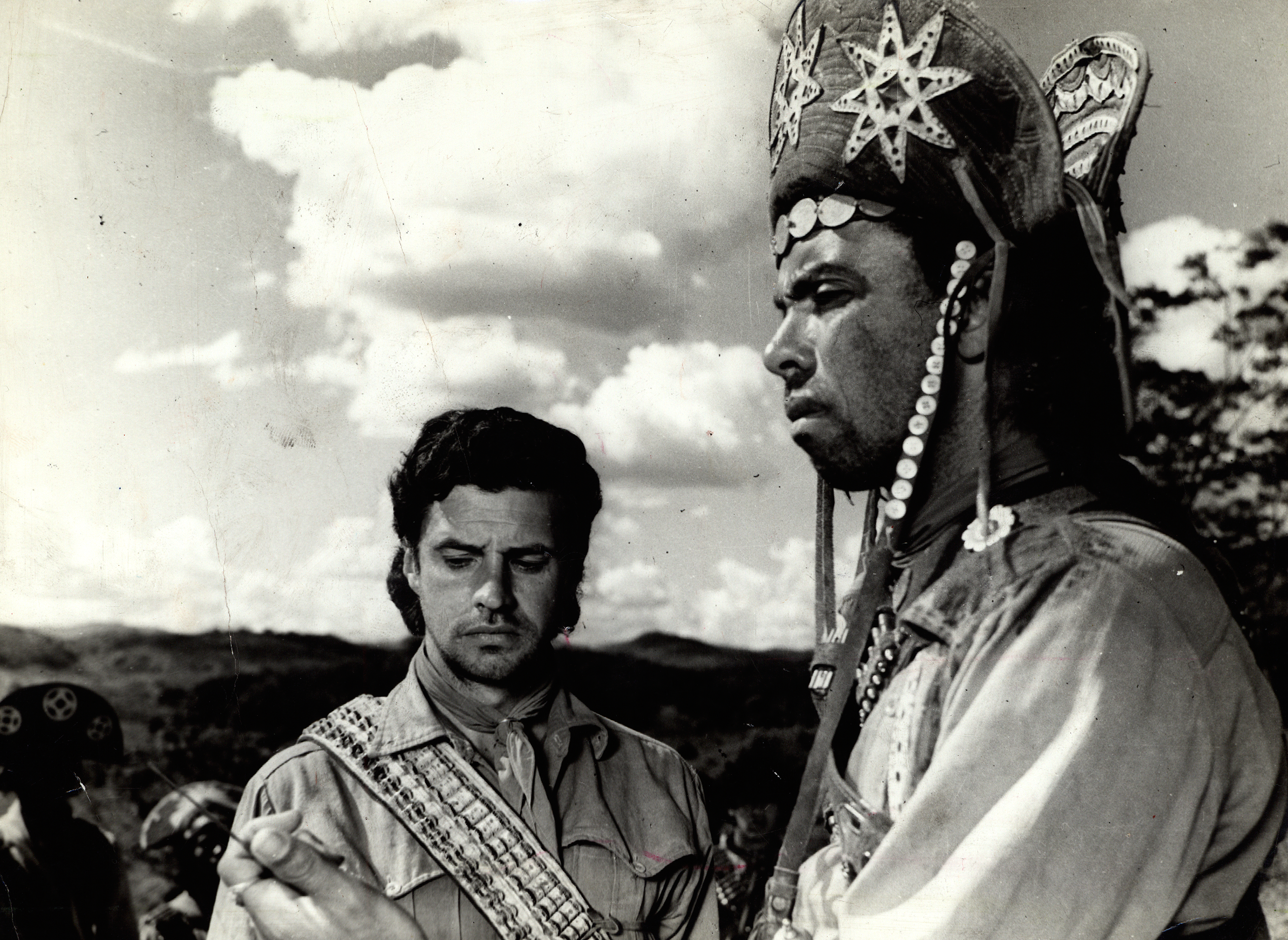
- Born: 21 February 1918; Estrela, Rio Grande do Sul, Brazil
- Died: 18 January 1996 (aged 77)
- Occupation: Actor
- Years active: 1947-1981

Alberto Ruschel (21 February 1918 – 18 January 1996) was a Brazilian actor, producer, and director. He appeared in more than 30 films between 1947 and 1981.

== Selected filmography ==
- O Cangaceiro (1953)
- Pride (1955)
- Cara de Fogo (1957)
- A Morte Comanda o Cangaço (1961)
- Aconcagua (1964)
- The Palace of Angels (1970)
