= Curucu, Beast of the Amazon =

1956 film by Curt Siodmak

- Film poster by Reynold Brown
- Directed by: Curt Siodmak
- Written by: Curt Siodmak
- Produced by: Richard Kay; Harry Rybnick
- Starring: John Bromfield; Beverly Garland; Tom Payne
- Cinematography: Rudolph Icey
- Edited by: Terry Morse
- Music by: Raoul Kraushaar
- Production company: Jewel Productions
- Distributed by: Universal International
- Release date: December 1, 1956
- Running time: 76 minutes
- Country: United States
- Language: English
- Budget: $155,000 (estimated)

Curucu, Beast of the Amazon is a 1956 American adventure/monster film, directed and written by Curt Siodmak and starring John Bromfield, Beverly Garland and Tom Payne. The title creature is pronounced "Koo-Ruh-SOO" (Portuguese: Curuçu). The film was distributed in the United States on December 1, 1956, as a double feature with The Mole People.

== Plot ==
Plantation owner Rock Dean (Bromfield) travels up the Amazon River to investigate why the workers have left in panic. Dean's guide, Tupanico (Payne) warns him of Curucu, a birdlike monster who is said to live up the river where no white man has ever been. Accompanying him is Dr. Andrea Romar (Garland), in search of a drug which (in this story) the natives use to shrink heads. She hopes this drug will be effective in reducing cancerous tissue.

Tupanico guides the couple through the jungle, where they see a strange shimmering form in the river which drives the bearers away. After Rock shoots an animal, Tupanico offers to clean his rifle for him. Rock reluctantly agrees.

Later, Curucu attacks. Rock shoots at it, with no effect. The monster is revealed to be Tupanico, who is trying to drive "his" people away from the plantations, where he can lead them in the old ways, before white men brought civilization and disease. Tupanico used the excuse of cleaning Rock's rifle to load it with blanks.

Before they can be killed, Rock and Andrea are rescued by natives friendly to the local missionary. After wandering lost in the jungle in the commotion, Andrea wakens to find herself and Rock at the mission. A grateful native, whom she treated earlier, gives her some gifts: the shrinking drug she was searching for, and the shrunken head of Tupanico.

== Cast ==
- John Bromfield as Rock Dean
- Beverly Garland as Dr. Andrea Romar
- Tom Payne as Tupanico
- Harvey Chalk as Father Flaviano
- Larri Thomas as Vivian, the Dancer
- Sergio de Oliveria as Captain of Police
- Wilson Viana as Tico
- Andrea Bayard
- Luz del Fuego

== Production ==
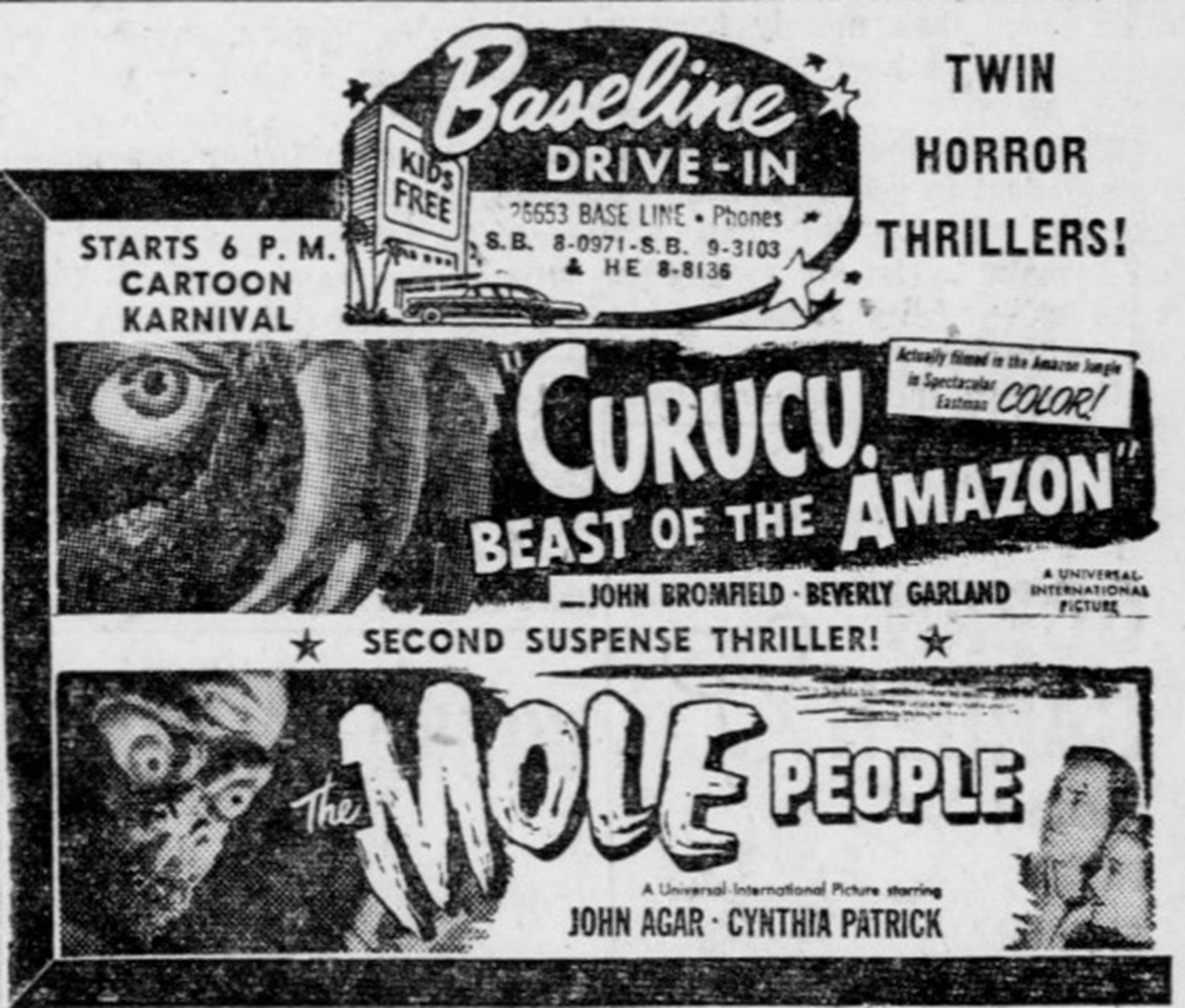
Drive-in advertisement from 1956 for Curucu, Beast of the Amazon and co-feature, The Mole People.

Curucu, Beast of the Amazon was shot in Eastmancolor, on location at the Amazon River in rural Brazil, with an estimated budget of $155,000.

Rudolph Icey handled cinematography, Raoul Kraushaar composed the score and Terry Morse served as editor.

After filming, Siodmak had 10,000 feet of color film left over that he could not export. Love Slaves of the Amazons was the result, and used some of the same cast members.

Reynold Brown, painter of numerous iconic Hollywood film posters, designed a poster for the film depicting a giant claw and a creature's glowering eye.

== Release ==
Curucu, Beast of the Amazon was released to theaters by Universal Studios on December 1, 1956, double-billed with The Mole People.

The film is now extremely rare, since it has never been officially released on either VHS or DVD.

On January 6, 2023, film restoration and distribution company Vinegar Syndrome announced they would be releasing a limited edition blu-ray of the film.

== Reception ==
Author and film critic Leonard Maltin awarded the film 1.5 out of 4 stars, calling it "one of the most infamous disappointments for monster-loving kids of the 1950s". On his website Fantastic Movie Musings and Ramblings, Dave Sindelar gave the film a negative review, criticizing the film for using too much talking and exploring scenes just to fill its running time. Sindelar also noted that the only thing the film had going for it was Garland's "tough girl" character, but also wrote, "Unfortunately, the movie decides to punish her for her toughness; the last 30 minutes of the movie seems designed solely to frighten this woman into realizing that it'’s arrogant of her to think of herself as being as tough as a man". TV Guide awarded the film 1 out of 5 stars, calling it "a moderately amusing jungle adventure".

== See also ==
- List of American films of 1956
