= The First Mass =

1961 film

- Theatrical release poster
- Directed by: Lima Barreto
- Written by: Lima Barreto; Nair Lacerda
- Based on: "Nhá Colaquinha Cheia de Graça" by Nair Lacerda
- Produced by: Ferdinando de Aguiar
- Starring: Roberto Alrean; Dionísio Azevedo
- Cinematography: H. E. Fowle
- Edited by: Mauro Alice
- Music by: Gabriel Migliori
- Production company: Campos Elísios Cinematográfica
- Distributed by: Condor Filmes; Fama Filmes
- Release date: 1 May 1961
- Running time: 90 minutes
- Country: Brazil
- Language: Portuguese

The First Mass (Portuguese: A Primeira Missa) is a 1961 Brazilian drama film directed by Lima Barreto, based on Nair Lacerda's short story "Nhá Colaquinha Cheia de Graça". It was entered into the 1961 Cannes Film Festival.

== Cast ==
- Roberto Alrean
- Dionísio Azevedo as Mestre Zuza
- Artur Barman
- Felipe Barreto
- Lima Barreto
- Martin Binder
- Francisco Brasileiro
- Ricardo Campos
- Margarida Cardoso
- Múcio Ferreira
- Galileu Garcia
- Vittorio Gobbis
- Jaime Gonçalves
- Luciano Gregory
- Henricão
- Nieta Junqueira
- Ferreira Leite
- Cavalheiro Lima
- José Mariano Filho
- Nelson Oliver
- Joel Penteado
- Jacyra Sampaio
