= Gian Gaspare Napolitano =

Italian journalist

- Born: 30 April 1907; Palermo, Sicily, Italy
- Died: 5 January 1966 (aged 58); Rome, Italy
- Occupations: Screenwriter; Film director
- Years active: 1935–1956

Gian Gaspare Napolitano (30 April 1907 – 5 January 1966) was an Italian journalist, screenwriter and film director.

During the 1920s, he wrote for the literary review "900", Cahiers d'Italie et d'Europe. He made ten films between 1935 and 1956. He was a member of the Venice Film Festival jury in 1951, 1953 and 1961. During the Second World War, he was a liaison officer with the Black Watch, and in 1945 he wrote the novel In guerra con gli scozzesi based on his experiences.

His film Magia verde won the Silver Bear at the Berlin Film Festival and was nominated for the Palme d'Or at Cannes.

== Filmography ==
- Red Passport (1935)
- Sentinels of Bronze (1937)
- I've Lost My Husband! (1937)
- I pirati del golfo (1940)
- L'uomo della legione (1940)
- The Cavalier from Kruja (1940)
- Giarabub (1942)
- Noi cannibali (1953)
- Magia verde (1953)
- Tam tam mayumbe (1955)
- War and Peace (1956)

== Notes ==
- Gian Gaspare Napolitano, "Il venditore di fumo", commedia teatrale, Edizioni Sabinae, Roma, 2008.
- Gian Gaspare Napolitano, "Una missione fra i Seris", Edizioni Sabinae, Roma, 2009.
