= Walter D'Ávila =

Brazilian actor and comedian

- The comedian, in an image from early in his career
- Born: November 29, 1911; Porto Alegre, Rio Grande do Sul, Brazil
- Died: April 19, 1996 (aged 84); Rio de Janeiro, Rio de Janeiro, Brazil
- Occupations: actor comedian
- Notable work: Baltazar da Rocha in Escolinha do Professor Raimundo
- Relatives: Ema D'Ávila (sister)

Walter D'Ávila (November 29, 1911 – April 19, 1996) was a Brazilian actor and comedian. He is known for his work as a cast member on TV Globo's comedy shows.

== Biography ==
Walter D'Ávila was born in Porto Alegre, the capital of Rio Grande do Sul. He began his career in 1935 at Rádio Sociedade Gaúcha in Porto Alegre. He moved to Rio de Janeiro to work on comedy radio shows and in revue theater productions. He started out at Rádio Nacional and later worked at Rádio Mayrink Veiga, where he made a name for himself on the show Aí Vem a Dona Isaura in 1958.

He made his film debut in the 1935 movie Noites Cariocas. He also appeared in films such as Berlin to the Samba Beat, Fogo na Canjica, The Lero-Lero Family, and Carnaval em lá maior. He made his television debut in 1958, also on TV Rio, appearing on the show Noite de Gala, and later appeared on other programs on the network, such as the Chico Anysio Show and Praça da Alegria.

He also appeared on TV Excelsior, TV Tupi, and TV Record, mostly on comedy shows. At TV Globo, he worked on several comedy productions, such as Planeta dos Homens, Chico Total, and Viva o Gordo, collaborating with comedians like Chico Anysio, Jô Soares, Grande Otelo, Pepita Rodríguez, and Luís Carlos Miele. He played the role of Baltazar da Rocha for six seasons on the show Escolinha do Professor Raimundo. In the 2015 remake directed by Bruno Mazzeo, his character was played by Otávio Muller. At the network, she also worked on the soap operas Feijão Maravilha and Espelho Mágico, and the TV series Aplauso.

=== Death ===
He died of heart failure at 10:50 a.m. on April 19, 1996, at the Sorocaba Clinic, located in the Botafogo neighborhood of Rio de Janeiro, where he had been hospitalized for cancer treatment. His body was buried the following day at the São João Batista Cemetery, also in Botafogo.

== Filmography ==
=== Television ===
Year	Titler	Character	Note(s)	Ref.
1968—1983	Balança mas Não Cai	Various		
1975—1979	Praça da Alegria	Various		
1977	Espelho Mágico			
1979	Feijão Maravilha	Scarface		
1981—1987	Viva o Gordo	Various		
1984	Humor Livre	Various	125 episodes	
1990—1996	Escolinha do Professor Raimundo	Baltazar da Rocha		

=== Cinema ===
Year	Title	Character	Ref.
1935	Noites Cariocas	Young	
1944	Berlim na Batucada		
1945	Pif-Paf	Bagaceira	
1946	O Ébrio	Primo Rego	
1946	Caídos do Céu	Claudionor	
1948	Fogo na Canjica		
1949	Pra Lá de Boa		
1950	Um Beijo Roubado	Apolo Silva	
1952	João Gangorra	João Gangorra	
1953	The Lero-Lero Family	Aquiles Taveira	
1955	Carnaval em Lá Maior	Moreira	
1957	Na Corda Bamba	Singer	
1958	É a Maior!	Evaristo	
1958	No Mundo da Lua	Matias/Zé	
1960	Pequeno por fora		
1961	3 Colegas de Batina		
1970	Motorista sem Limites	Detetive Leão	
1974	As Delícias da Vida		
1981	Professor Kranz tedesco di Germania	Fittipaldi	

== Personal life ==
He was the brother of actress and comedian Ema D'Ávila.
