= Anselmo Duarte =

Brazilian actor, film director and screenwriter (1920 – 2009)

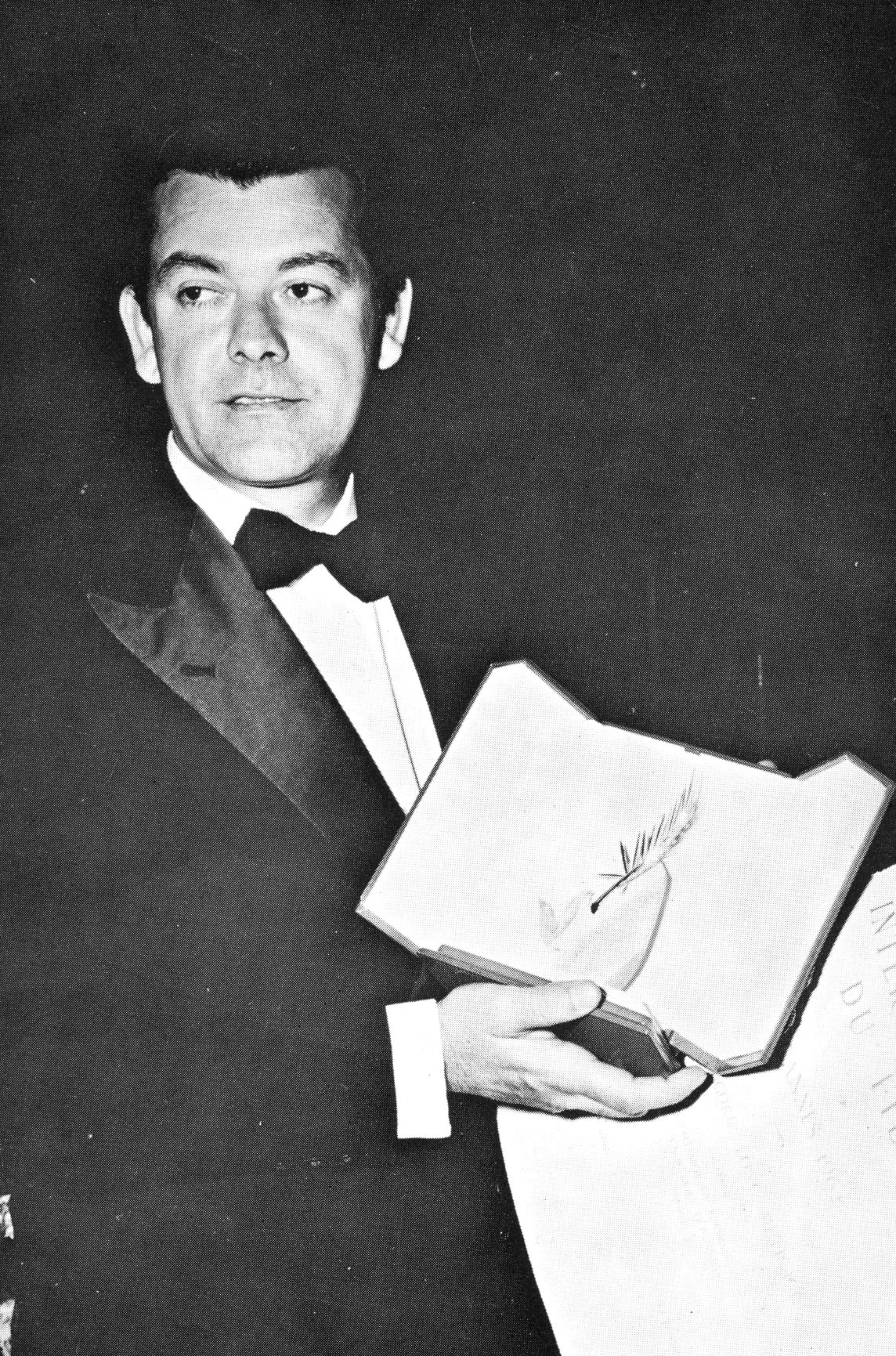
- Duarte with his Palm d'Or in 1962
- Born: April 21, 1920; Salto, São Paulo, Brazil
- Died: November 7, 2009 (aged 89); São Paulo, São Paulo, Brazil
- Occupations: Actor; film director; screen writer
- Years active: 1947–1987
- Spouse: Ilka Soares (m. 1952; div. 1956)
- Children: 4

Anselmo Duarte Bento (Portuguese pronunciation: [ɐ̃ˈsɛwmu duˈaʁtʃi]; 21 April 1920 – 7 November 2009) was a Brazilian actor, screenwriter and filmmaker.

He was most known for his drama film O Pagador de Promessas (1962), which won the Palme d'Or at the 1962 Cannes Film Festival. As of 2026, the only South-American film to do so.

== Early life ==
Duarte was born in Salto, São Paulo on 21 April 1920. He was raised by his mother, alongside his six siblings.

== Career ==
His 1962 film O Pagador de Promessas—Keeper of Promises—was awarded the Golden Palm at the 1962 Cannes Film Festival, becoming, to date, the only Brazilian feature film to be distinguished this way and the first winner from the Southern Hemisphere. The film was also nominated for the Academy Award for Best Foreign Language Film. Furthermore, O Pagador de Promessas won awards for Best Film and Best Musical Score at the San Francisco International Film Festival and for Best Film at the Acapulco Film Festival, the Cartagena Film Festival, the Karlovy Vary International Film Festival and the Edinburgh International Film Festival in 1962. His 1964 film Vereda da Salvação—The Obsessed of Catule—was nominated for the Golden Bear at the 15th Berlin International Film Festival.

The then President of Brazil, Luiz Inácio Lula da Silva, awarded Duarte the Order of Cultural Merit in 2008, Brazil's highest cultural civilian honor, and the Governor of São Paulo, José Serra, awarded him the Order of Ipiranga, which is the state's highest civilian honor. He was also declared an honorary citizen by numerous Brazilian municipalities, including Rio de Janeiro, São Paulo and Salto, his birthplace.

In 2008, Duarte together with his son, Ricardo, founded an organization, Instituto Anselmo Duarte, with the intention of restoring 26 of Anselmo's films and distributing them, free of charge, in 10,000 Brazilian cultural institutions. After Duarte's death, his son continued with their project.

Shortly before his death in 2009, the municipality of Salto inaugurated a multimillion-dollar cultural and educational center named "Centro Cultural e Educacional Anselmo Duarte", housing a 500 audience amphitheater for film and theatrical events. In addition, the center publicly displays the original Golden Palm awarded to Duarte at the Cannes Film Festival.

== Personal life ==
=== Marriage and family ===
Between 1952 and 1956, he was married to Ilka Soares, with whom he become one of Brazil's leading celebrity couples, and they had two children. In total, he had 4 children.

=== Political activity ===
He was also a freemason.

=== Illness and death ===
After being diagnosed with Alzheimer's disease five years prior to his death, Duarte spent the last years of his life under the care of his son, Ricardo.

Three months before his death, in August, he was hospitalized in São Paulo after suffering from a heart attack in addition to kidney failure and anemia caused by a urinary tract infection. Additionally, he was diagnosed with a bladder cancer and underwent surgery to remove the malignant tumor. Although both the bladder cancer and heart conditions had been successfully treated, he was again hospitalized in October after having a hemorrhagic stroke. Duarte died shortly after, on 7 November 2009, in São Paulo due to complications from the stroke.

== Selected filmography ==
The following is a list of selected feature films which Duarte wrote, directed or appeared in.

- Querida Suzana (1947)
- Não Me Digas Adeus (1947)
- Terra Violenta (1948)
- Inconfidência Mineira (1948)
- Pinguinho de Gente (1949)
- O Caçula do Barulho (1949)
- Carnaval no Fogo (1949)
- Aviso aos Navegantes (1950)
- A Sombra da Outra (1950)
- Maior Que o Ódio (1951)
- Tico-Tico no Fubá (1952)
- Apassionata (1952)
- Veneno (1952)
- Amei um Bicheiro (1952) (writer, uncredited)
- The Landowner's Daughter (1953)
- Carnaval em Marte (1955) (writer)
- Sinfonia Carioca (1955)
- Senhora (1955)
- Depois Eu Conto (1956) (writer)
- O Diamante (1956)
- Arara Vermelha (1957)
- Absolutamente Certo (1957) (director, writer)
- Fazendo Cinema (1957)
- O Cantor e o Milionário (1958)
- Un Rayo de Luz (1960)
- As Pupilas do Senhor Reitor (1961) (writer)
- O Pagador de Promessas (1962) (writer)
- Vereda da Salvação (1964) (director, writer)
- The Obsessed of Catule (1964) (director)
- Case of the Naves Brothers (1967)
- A Espiã Que Entrou em Fria (1967)
- Juventude e Ternura (1968)
- A Madona de Cedro (1968)
- Quelé do Pajeú (1969) (director, writer)
- O Impossível Acontece (1969) (director, writer)
- Um Certo Capitão Rodrigo (1971) (director, writer)
- Independência ou Morte (1972)
- O Descarte (1973) (director, writer)
- O Marginal (1974)
- A Noiva da Noite (1974)
- Assim Era a Atlântida (1974) (documentary)
- A Casa das Tentações (1975)
- Ninguém Segura Essas Mulheres (1976) (director, writer)
- Paranóia (1976)
- Já Não Se Faz Amor como Antigamente (1976) (director, writer)
- O Crime do Zé Bigorna (1977 (director, writer)
- Embalos Alucinantes (1978)
- Os Trombadinhas (1979) (director)
- O Caçador de Esmeraldas (1979) (writer)
- Tensão no Rio (1982)
- Brasa Adormecida (1987) (final film role)
