= The Mole People =

1956 film by Virgil W. Vogel

- Poster by Joseph Smith
- Directed by: Virgil Vogel
- Written by: László Görög
- Produced by: William Alland
- Starring: John Agar; Cynthia Patrick; Hugh Beaumont; Nestor Paiva; Alan Napier
- Cinematography: Ellis W. Carter
- Edited by: Irving Birnbaum
- Music by: Joseph Gershenson
- Distributed by: Universal Pictures
- Release date: December 1, 1956
- Running time: 77 minutes
- Country: United States
- Language: English
- Budget: $200,000

The Mole People is a 1956 American science fiction adventure horror film distributed by Universal International, which was produced by William Alland, directed by Virgil W. Vogel, and stars John Agar, Hugh Beaumont, and Cynthia Patrick. The story is written by László Görög. The film was released on December 1, 1956, on a double feature with their jungle adventure film Curucu, Beast of the Amazon. It has also been featured on episodes of Mystery Science Theater 3000 and Svengoolie.

The film is loosely based on theories about the Hollow Earth. It depicts an underground civilization created by Sumerian descendants, who worship Ishtar.

== Plot ==
A narration by Dr. Frank Baxter, an English professor at the University of Southern California, explains the premise of the film and its basis in reality. He briefly discusses the Hollow Earth theories of John Symmes and Cyrus Teed among others and says that the film is a fictionalized representation of these unorthodox theories.

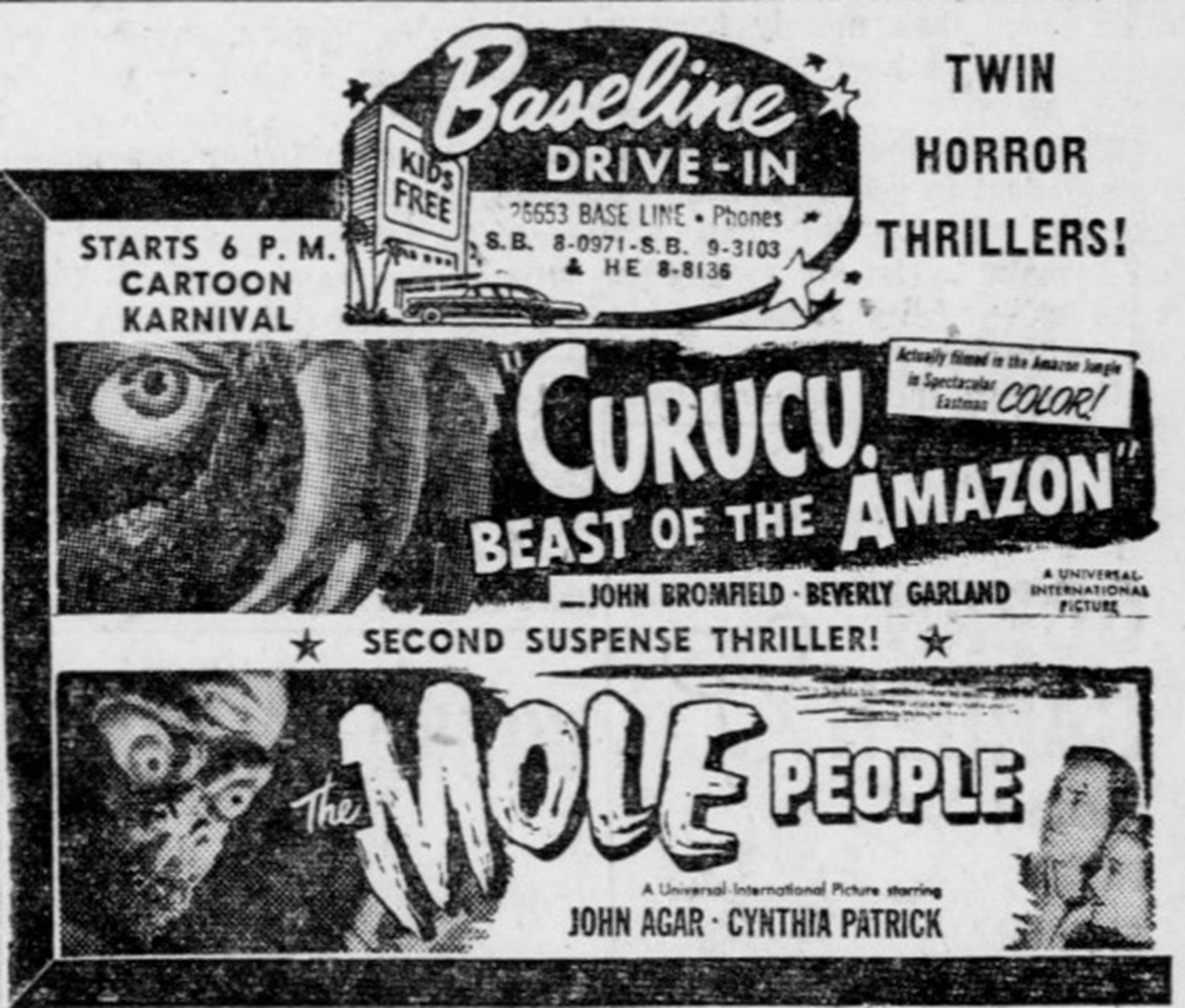
Drive-in advertisement from 1956 for The Mole People and co-feature, Curucu, Beast of the Amazon.

Archaeologists Dr. Roger Bentley and Dr. Jud Bellamin find a race of Sumerian albinos living deep under the Earth. They keep mutant humanoid mole men as their slaves to harvest mushrooms, which serve as their primary food source. The Sumerian albinos' ancestors relocated into the subterranean after cataclysmic floods in ancient Mesopotamia. They believe the men are messengers of Ishtar, their goddess. Whenever their population increases, they sacrifice young women to the Eye of Ishtar. These people have lived underground for so long that they are weakened by the light coming from the archaeologists' flashlight. However, there is one girl, named Adad, with natural white skin who is disdained by the others since she has the "mark of darkness."

When Professor Etienne Lafarge, one of the archaeologists, is killed by a mole person, Elinu, the High Priest, realizes they are not gods. He orders their capture and takes the flashlight to control the Mole People, not knowing it is depleted. The archaeologists are then sent to the Eye of Ishtar just as the Mole People rebel. Adad goes to the Eye only to realize it is really natural light coming from the surface and that the men had survived. They then climb to the surface. Unfortunately, as they are about to leave, an earthquake strikes. Adad suddenly decides to go back to her home but dies when a pillar falls on her.

== Cast ==
- John Agar as Dr. Roger Bentley
- Cynthia Patrick as Adad
- Hugh Beaumont as Dr. Jud Bellamin
- Alan Napier as Elinu
- Nestor Paiva as Prof. Etienne Lafarge
- Phil Chambers as Dr. Paul Stuart
- Rodd Redwing as Nazar
- Robin Hughes as First Officer
- Frank Baxter as Himself

== Reception ==
Critic Glenn Erickson wrote in DVD Talk that Virgil W. Vogel "directs as well as could be expected under the circumstances," that "there aren't too many unintentional laughs and we get enough key monster action to make kids happy," and that the film "is a mole-hill attempt at a Lost Civilization epic, but its engaged performances (minus the low-energy Hugh Beaumont, perhaps) and interesting story twists make up for some slow sequences." Writing in AllMovie, critic Hal Erickson described the film as "the weakest of the Universal-International horror films" and "so dull and plodding that stars John Agar and Hugh Beaumont seem like Mel Gibson and Arnold Schwarzenegger in comparison." A review in TV Guide reported that "scientific hullabaloo surrounds this terrible tale of a team of explorers," and that it includes "a hysterical (however unintentionally so) prologue from a University of Southern California professor" (Frank Baxter).

== Home media ==
Universal first released The Mole People on VHS on June 30, 1993. Later, in 2006, the film was released on DVD in a boxed set called The Classic Sci-Fi Ultimate Collection, which featured 4 other films (Tarantula, The Incredible Shrinking Man, The Monolith Monsters, and Monster on the Campus). Universal then re-released this film in 2015 as a stand-alone DVD as part of its Universal Vault Series. Shout Factory's 2019 Blu-ray release includes an audio commentary by Tom Weaver, David Schecter and Jan Alan Henderson, plus other extras. There is also a Region 2 DVD and Blu-ray release of this film from 101 Films.

== In other media ==
The film was featured on the eighth season of the television program Mystery Science Theater 3000. The characters respond to the abrupt and unsatisfying ending by bitterly declaring "And no one trusted a John Agar movie again."

A segment of the film was used in 1966's The Wild World of Batwoman, as creatures created by one of the film's villains, Rat Fink (Richard Banks). This use was itself parodied by Mystery Science Theater 3000, with Crow T. Robot (Trace Beaulieu) and Tom Servo (Kevin Murphy) mocking the classic slogan for Reese's Peanut Butter Cups ("you got your Batwoman in my Mole People!"). After the segment ends, Mike Nelson imitates Rat Fink, proclaiming "well, I've had enough of THAT film."

The film was shown on the MeTV show Svengoolie on April 22, 2023. The caged, decayed corpse of a Mole Person can be seen at the outskirts of the Darkmoor village at Dark Universe, the Epic Universe theme park land at Universal Studios in Florida.

== Mythology ==
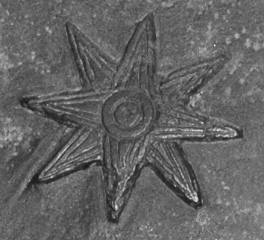
One version of the star symbol of Inanna / Ishtar.

The fictionalized Mesopotamian history presented by the movie is based largely on Panbabylonism, as both Sumerian and Judaic stories describe the same events of the movie. Dr. Roger Bentley (Agar) states, erroneously, that the Biblical flood is an established archaeological fact, and the stranding of the Sumerians atop the mountain is a reference to the tale of Noah's Ark.

Similarly to the protagonists of the movie, Ishtar descends to the underworld. There is a Panbabylonic connection between Ishtar's descent and the Old Testament story of Joseph. The descent to the underworld is a common story of world mythologies, as is the flood myth.

The movie erroneously associates Ishtar and the Sumerians. Ishtar was the Babylonian counterpart of the Sumerian goddess Inanna. The imagery associated with Ishtar in the movie is entirely fictional: Ishtar's symbol was an eight-pointed star representing Venus rather than the uneven chevron in the movie. All of the gods depicted on the temple walls are Egyptian, not Sumerian. Adad is an Akkadian (male) storm-god and counterpart to the Sumerian Ishkur.

== See also ==
- Mole Man (1961), character from the Marvel Universe
