= Ricardo Campos (actor) =

Brazilian actor

Ricardo Campos was a Brazilian actor active in the 1950s and 1960s. In the 1953 Governor of São Paulo Prizes for cinema, he won the best newcomer award for O Cangaceiro. He also appeared in The Landowner's Daughter (1953) and The First Mass (1961).
