= Gabriel Migliori =

Gabriel Migliori (November 1909 – January 1975) was a Brazilian composer, pianist, and conductor. Born in São Paulo, he had musical classes with Savino de Benedicts^{(pt)}, Armando Pugliesi, and Agostino Cantú^{(pt)}. He composed music orchestras and films as well.

Migliori's work on O Cangaceiro's music earned him a special mention at the 1953 Cannes Film Festival. Nine years later, his composition for O Pagador de Promessas won the Best Musical Score at the San Francisco International Film Festival.

== Selected filmography ==
- O Cangaceiro (1953)
- The Lero-Lero Family (1953)
- Who Killed Anabela? (1956)
- Cidade Ameaçada (1960)
- The First Mass (1961)
- O Pagador de Promessas (1962)
