= The Monolith Monsters =

1957 film by John Sherwood

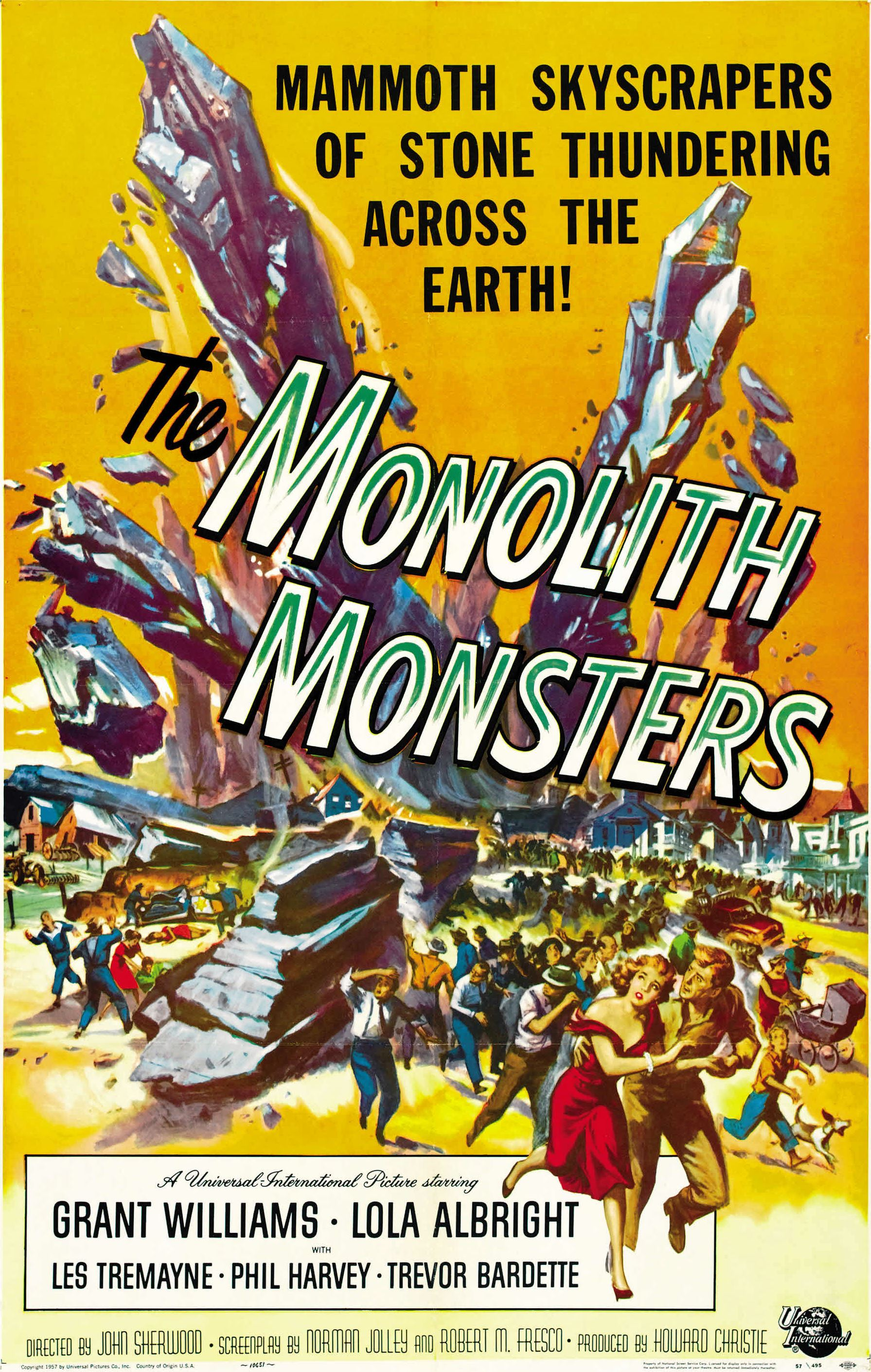
- Theatrical release poster by Reynold Brown
- Directed by: John Sherwood
- Screenplay by: Norman Jolley; Robert M. Fresco
- Story by: Jack Arnold; Robert M. Fresco
- Produced by: Howard Christie
- Starring: Grant Williams; Lola Albright; Les Tremayne; William Schallert
- Narrated by: Paul Frees (uncredited)
- Cinematography: Ellis W. Carter
- Edited by: Patrick McCormack
- Music by: Uncredited: Henry Mancini; Irving Getz; Herman Stein
- Production company: Universal-International
- Distributed by: Universal Pictures
- Release date: December 6, 1957
- Running time: 77 minutes
- Country: United States

The Monolith Monsters is a 1957 American science-fiction disaster film from Universal-International, produced by Howard Christie, directed by John Sherwood, and starring Grant Williams and Lola Albright. The film is based on a story by Jack Arnold and Robert M. Fresco, with a screenplay by Fresco and Norman Jolley. The film was released on December 6, 1957 on a double bill with Love Slaves of the Amazons (1957).

The Monolith Monsters tells the story of a large meteorite that crashes in a Southern California desert and explodes into hundreds of black fragments that have strange properties. When those fragments are exposed to water, they grow extremely large and tall. The fragments also begin to cause some of the inhabitants of a nearby small town to petrify. The unfolding story becomes one of human survival against an encroaching unnatural disaster that, if not stopped, could become an ecological nightmare, and pose a threat to all of humanity.

== Plot ==
In the desert outside of San Angelo, California, a meteorite crashes, scattering hundreds of black fragments. The next day, Federal geologist Ben Gilbert brings one of the fragments to his office. He and local newspaper publisher Martin Cochrane examine it. That night, a strong wind blows over a full water container onto the black rock, starting a chemical reaction.

Dave Miller, the head of San Angelo's district geological office, returns from a business trip and finds Ben's corpse in a rock-hard, petrified state and the office's lab damaged by rock fragments. Dave's girlfriend, teacher Cathy Barrett, takes her students on a desert field trip; young Ginny Simpson pockets a piece of the black meteorite rock, later washing it in a tub outside her family's farmhouse. In town Dr. E. J. Reynolds performs Ben's autopsy and cannot explain the body's condition; he sends the body to a specialist. Martin returns to the wrecked office with Dave, where he recognizes the fragments as the same type of black rock Ben had been examining.

Cathy joins them, also recognizing the fragments. They go to the Simpson farm, which they find in ruins under a pile of black rocks. Ginny's parents are dead, and Ginny is in a catatonic state. At Dr. Reynolds' request, they rush her to Dr. Steve Hendricks at the California Medical Research Institute in Los Angeles. He reports that Ginny is turning to stone. Dave brings a fragment to his old college professor, Arthur Flanders, who determines that it came from a meteorite. Back at the Simpson farm, both men notice a discoloration in the ground; tests show the black rock is draining silicon from everything it touches. Dr. Reynolds says research indicates that one possible function of silicon in the human body is to maintain tissue flexibility. They realize that absorption of silicon is the cause of Ben's death and Ginny's condition.

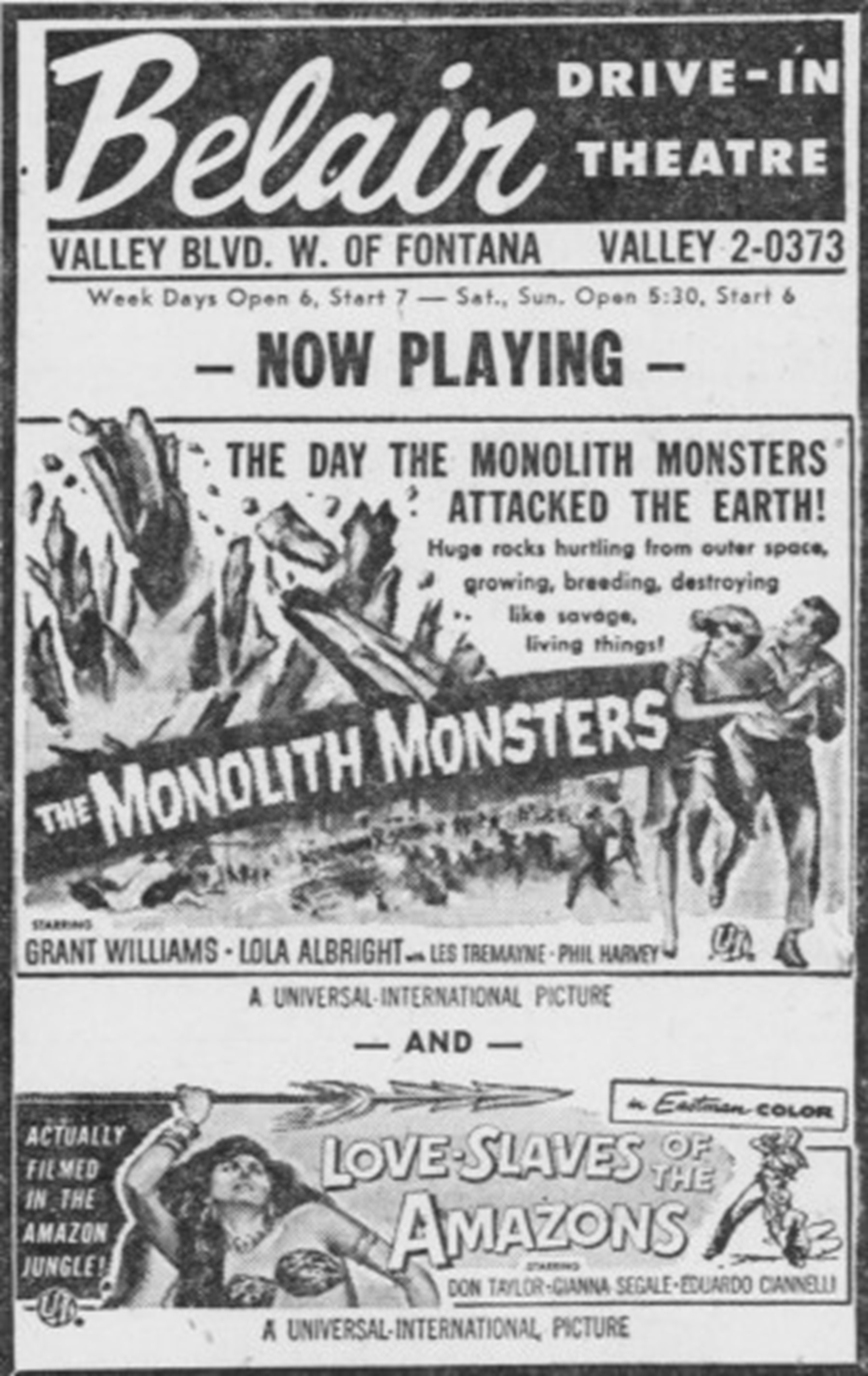
Drive-in advertisement featuring The Monolith Monsters with companion feature, Love Slaves of the Amazons.

Dave and Arthur trace the fragments to the crashed meteor. Arthur deduces that the meteorite's atomic structure has been radically altered by the intense heat of atmospheric friction. In the meantime, Dr. Hendricks administers a silicon injection to Ginny. Back in the lab, Dave and Arthur investigate why the black rocks seem to be multiplying. A piece of black rock falls into the sink and reacts when coffee is poured on it; the men then realize that water is the cause of its growth. With a rainstorm now in progress, they return to the desert and see the black fragments growing into stories-tall monoliths that collapse under their own weight, breaking into fragments, each fragment then repeating that cycle. Dave realizes that the monoliths' path will take them directly through San Angelo, and from there the monoliths could spread and possibly threaten all life on Earth.

They explain the threat to Police Chief Dan Corey, who makes plans to evacuate San Angelo. The governor is notified, and declares a state of emergency in the San Angelo area. At the hospital, Ginny revives, and Dave deduces that something in the silicon solution will check the fragments' growth. More locals are rushed to Dr. Reynolds' office in various stages of petrification. With little time left, and the telephone and electricity cut off, the monoliths continue to multiply and advance, soaking up water from the rain-soaked soil. Through lab experimentation, Dave and Arthur discover the monoliths can be stopped with a simple saline solution, a part of Steve's silicon formula.

Dave plans to dynamite the local dam and flood the nearby salt flats, creating a large supply of salt water. Because the dam is private property, Dan attempts to contact the governor for permission to blow up the dam. Knowing they must halt the monoliths at the canyon's edge, Dave acts without waiting for the governor's approval. A torrent of water flows over the salt deposits at the canyon's edge, reaching the monoliths; their growth is halted. Dan reports that he reached the governor who told him not to blow up the dam ... unless Dave was absolutely certain of success. Dave comments on Martin's earlier assertion that the region's salt flat was "Mother Nature's worst mistake," pointing out that this near-disaster has proved otherwise.

== Cast ==
- Grant Williams as Dave Miller
- Lola Albright as Cathy Barrett
- Les Tremayne as Martin Cochrane
- Trevor Bardette as Professor Arthur Flanders
- Phil Harvey as Ben Gilbert
- William Flaherty as Police Chief Dan Corey
- Harry Jackson as Dr. Steve Hendricks
- Richard H. Cutting as Dr. E. J. Reynolds
- Linda Scheley as Ginny Simpson
- Claudia Bryar as Mrs. Simpson
- Dean Cromer as Lead Highway Patrolman
- Steve Darrell as Rancher Joe Higgins
- William Schallert as Meteorologist
- Troy Donahue as Hank Jackson – Dynamite Expert
- Paul Petersen as Bobby – Newsboy
- Paul Frees as opening narrator (uncredited)

== Production ==
Many of the exteriors were filmed in the Alabama Hills in Lone Pine, California. The rugged landscape of the area has been used as a backdrop for many films, including Gunga Din, High Sierra, Maverick, How the West Was Won, The Charge of the Light Brigade, and Gladiator. Most of the exteriors of downtown San Angelo were shot on Universal's back lot, particularly Courthouse Square.

The fictional California Medical Research Institute also features prominently in Universal's The Incredible Shrinking Man, which stars Grant Williams as well, and was released eight months earlier.

=== Special effects ===
The film's special effects were created by Clifford Stine, whose career began in 1933 with King Kong. Alternate takes of effects created by Stine for Universal's It Came from Outer Space (1953) were used to depict the meteor crash in the film's opening sequence.

== Reception ==
In a contemporary review, the Monthly Film Bulletin described the feature as a "promising idea" but noted that it was not supported by either the acting or the script.

One review noted, "Give Hollywood a measured amount of credit for at least attempting to give us something unique and unusual, even if it comes up a little short".

CineOutsider observed, "Certainly it lacks the subtextual clout that distinguishes the best of these films, but its central concept, its pacing and its impressive production design and effects still put it on a par with its more widely seen contemporaries. The performances are all solid, but my favorite comes from an uncredited William Schallert as the wrapped-up-in-his-job weatherman. For fans of 50s science fiction cinema, enthusiastically recommended".

== Home media ==
Universal released The Monolith Monsters on DVD as part of a boxed set called The Classic Sci-Fi Ultimate Collection, which features four additional Universal feature films: The Incredible Shrinking Man, Monster on the Campus, The Mole People, and Tarantula. In June 2019, Shout Factory released the film on Blu-ray. The disc includes an audio commentary track by Tom Weaver (discussing the movie's production history) and David Schecter (analyzing the movie's music).

== References in other media ==
Scenes from The Monolith Monsters appear briefly in John Carpenter's 1988 science fiction action horror film They Live, and in Roland Emmerich's 1996 science fiction movie Independence Day.

The concept of the self-replicating mineral used in The Monolith Monsters became the basis for Tiberium in the Command and Conquer video game series.

== See also ==
- List of American films of 1957
- The Crystal Horde by John Taine
- The Crystal World by J. G. Ballard: the Earth element novel in Ballard's elemental apocalypse tetralogy, in which crystallizing jungles grow to transform the world.
