= Tom Payne (director) =

Brazilian film director

- Tom Payne in Curucu, Beast of the Amazon
- Born: Thomas Payne; 4 October 1914; Lomas de Zamora, Argentina
- Died: 15 September 1996 (aged 81); Alfenas, Minas Gerais, Brazil
- Occupations: Film director Screenwriter; Actor
- Years active: 1931–1963

Thomas Payne (4 October 1914 – 15 September 1996) was an Argentine film director, screenwriter and actor, known for The Landowner's Daughter (1955), Payne and Hilliard (1931) and Curucu, Beast of the Amazon (1956). His film Sinhá Moça was entered into the 4th Berlin International Film Festival.

== Early life and career ==
Payne was born in Argentina and started living in England, when he was 16 years old.

In 1937, he worked in English cinema as an extra and stuntman. He was invited by Alberto Cavalcanti to work in Vera Cruz's studio.

He married Eliane Lage, having met her in the studio and invited her to act in Caiçara, in 1951.

After leaving his cinematic career, Payne became an antique dealer, having settled in Guarujá.

== Filmography ==
As Director

- Caiçara (1950)
- Ângela (1951)
- Terra É Sempre Terra (1952)
- Sai da Frente (1952)
- Sinhá Moça (1953)
- Arara Vermelha (1957)

As Actor

- No Hiding Place (1963)(TV Series) 3 episodes
- Ghost Squad (1963) (TV Series)
- Z Cars (TV Series) Undetermined role
- Found Abandoned (1962) ... Undetermined role (uncredited)
- Soldier, Soldier (1961) (TV Movie)
- Sykes and A... (1961) (TV Series) - Sykes and a Movie Camera
- The Larkins (1958) (TV Series)
- Arara Vermelha (1957)
- Love Slaves of the Amazons (1957) Dr. Mario Dellamano
- Curucu, Beast of the Amazon (1956) Tupanico
- Call Back Yesterday (TV Movie) (1956) Stage doorkeeper
- The Landowner's Daughter (1955)
- Caiçara (uncredited) (1950)
- Sinfonia fatale (1946)
- We're Going to Be Rich (1938) Kinch
- The Show Goes On (1937) Professor Augustino
- Feather Your Nest (1937) Fortner
- Keep Your Seats, Please! (1936) Man from Child Welfare
- Queen of Hearts (1936) Doorkeeper (uncredited)
- Maria Marten, or The Murder in the Red Barn (1936) Jailer (uncredited)
- Payne and Hilliard (1931) (Short)

== Death ==
He died of respiratory failure on 15 September 1996 in Alfenas and was buried in Areado.
