= Fazenda Velha =

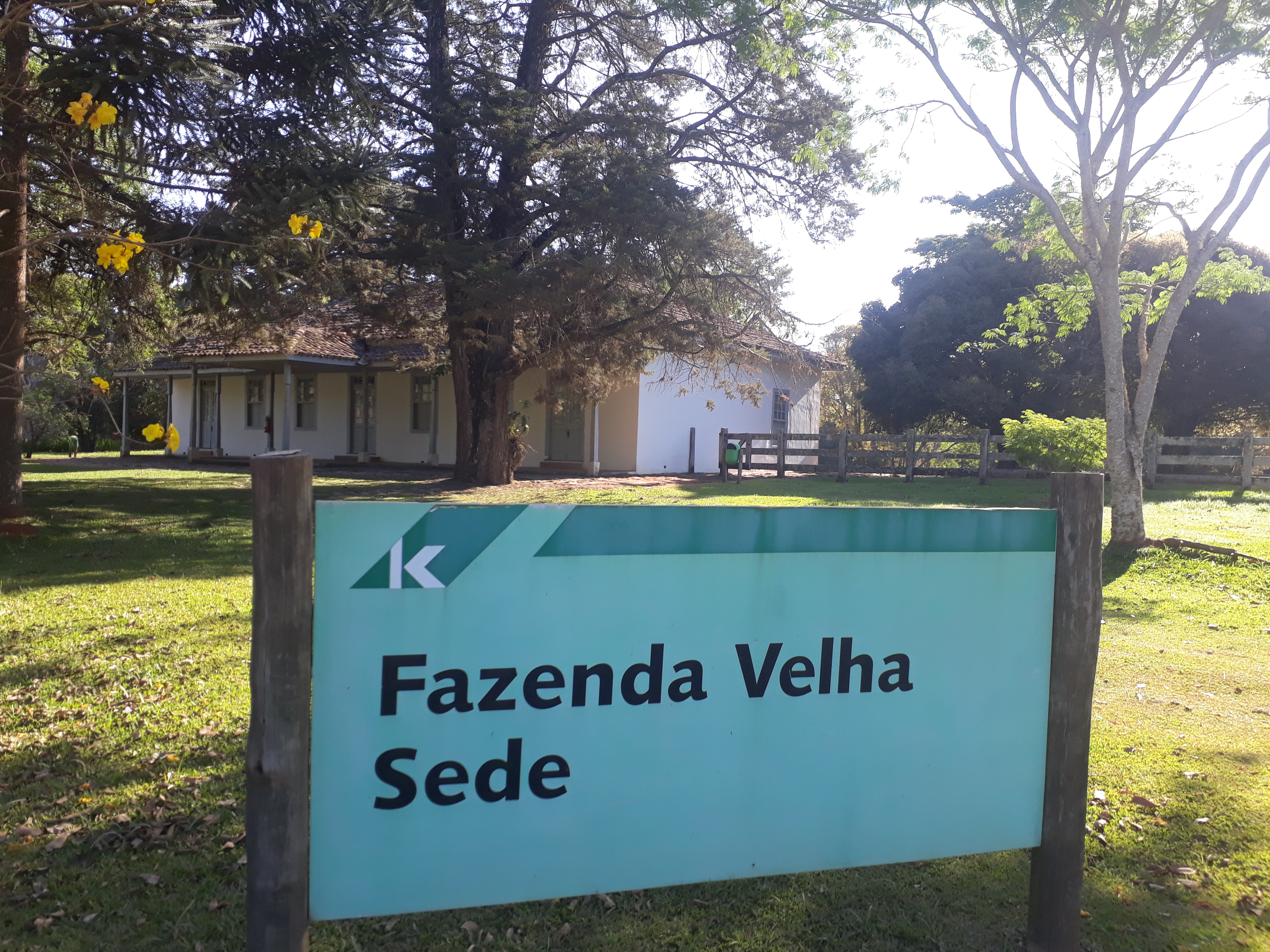
Colonial-style mansion at Fazenda Velha (2017)

Fazenda Velha is a Brazilian preserved site in the municipality of Telêmaco Borba, in Paraná, which houses a colonial-style mansion that served as the headquarters of the old Monte Alegre Farm (also called Fazenda do Alegre), along with other small buildings, such as the old water tank. This area is part of the so-called "Sertões do Tibagi" (Tibagi Hinterlands), in the Campos Gerais region, on the Second Parana Plateau, in the Central Eastern region of Paraná. All of this farm area and its structures currently belong to the Klabin Group, which operates in the region through the Monte Alegre Unit (a paper industry in Telêmaco Borba) and the Paraná Forestry Department (of Klabin S.A.). The farm was once owned by federalist military officer Bonifácio José Batista, known as the Baron of Monte Carmelo.

== Origins and background ==
The colonial farm is considered the first white settlement in the 'Campos do Alegre,' in the current area of Telêmaco Borba. Previously, these fields near the Alegre River were solely inhabited by Caingangue indigenous people, known as bugres or botocudos, who developed their culture under the pine forests. Some other indigenous groups in the region were also converted by Jesuit missions in Paraná in the 17th century, such as in the neighboring municipality of Ortigueira, with the Jesuit reduction of Nuestra Señora de la Encarnación, near the current locality of Natingui. In the 18th century, there was a massacre of these indigenous people, an episode known as the 'Tibagi Massacre'. José Félix da Silva, a major landowner in the region and owner of Fazenda Fortaleza in the municipality of Tibagi, in the Campos Gerais, aimed to expand his property and ordered the killing of the indigenous people, justifying it as revenge for the death of an associate. The location of the massacre was known until the 20th century as Mortandade. Félix da Silva then managed to control the lands north of Campos Gerais.

In the 19th century, the writer and federalist colonel Telêmaco Augusto Enéas Morosini Borba explored the region, also studying the remaining indigenous people of that particular ethnicity. In 1882, the colonel wrote the Small Vocabulary of the Portuguese and Kaingang or Coroado Languages, along with another Vocabulary of the Cayuga and Chavantes Languages, both published in the Catalog of Objects of the Paranaense Museum, works of significant value, which, by reports, remain unique in their genre to this day. He also wrote Current Indigenous Affairs, a compendium of indigenous information, in 1908. In 1883, he published in the Journal of the Geographical Society of Lisbon, the article Brief News about the Caingang Indians, which was reprinted in 1935 in Vienna, in the International Journal of Ethnology and Linguistics Anthropos. He expressed his thoughts in a small weekly called O Tibagy in 1904, for two years. His numerous studies in the region led him to become a member of the Brazilian Historical and Geographical Institute and the Historical, Geographic, and Ethnographic Institute of Paraná. Finally, Colonel Telêmaco Borba stood out so much that in politics, he became mayor of the territory belonging to Fazenda Velha, as well as a provincial deputy for several terms.

== Campos do Alegre ==
The lands of Campos do Alegre then became the property of Commander Manoel Ignácio do Canto e Silva, who was also a brigadier general, director of indigenous affairs, councilman in the municipality of Castro, provincial deputy, and candidate for the Federal Senate. Manoel Ignácio was the grandson of José Félix da Silva, and during his tenure of Fazenda do Alegre, he ordered the construction of the ‘'Casa Grande'’ (Great House), the mansion that became the farm's headquarters.

Later, the federalist military officer Bonifácio José Batista, known as the Baron of Monte Carmelo, son of the pioneer Tomás Dias Batista and a member of a prominent family from Paraná, inherited the farm in 1864, during the Empire of Brazil. The baron, a farmer, councilman in the municipality of Castro, provincial deputy, commander of the National Guard, and financial supporter of the Federalist Revolution, was married to Ana Luísa Novais do Canto e Silva, daughter of Commander Manoel Ignácio. The baron died in 1897, and all his properties in Paraná were passed down to his heirs.

In 1926, descendants of Bonifácio José Batista partnered with the Frenchman Edouard Fontaine de Laveleye to establish a venture, resulting in the foundation of the Monte Alegre Agricultural and Forestry Company and Railway, which aimed to exploit the farm's resources, such as minerals, timber, and agricultural development. The company obtained a loan from the Bank of the State of Paraná to ensure financial support for investments, with the entire farm being used as collateral. The company went bankrupt, and in 1932, Fazenda Monte Alegre became the property of the bank through an auction.

In 1934, the Klabin brothers acquired the farm, aiming at forestry production. Today, the old headquarters of Fazenda Velha is part of the current boundaries of Fazenda Monte Alegre, which also incorporated other localities. Thus, this entire territorial extension has belonged to the Klabin Group for more than 80 years and continues to be managed and administered by this company in the 21st century.

== The Great House ==
The mansion, the main historical building on the farm, is considered a historical heritage site of the municipality of Telêmaco Borba, being the only remaining colonial-style building in the municipality. The oldest part of the headquarters is made of rammed earth walls, a construction technique that uses moistened clay compacted between wooden forms to create continuous panels of structural walls. This technique was introduced in Brazil by the Portuguese and became widespread in São Paulo lands since the 16th century.

During the Franco-Brazilian enterprise period, modifications were allegedly made to the mansion, such as the construction of a front porch. In the 1930s, with the acquisition of the land by the Klabin family, the headquarters received additional housing for the people involved in the establishment of The New Paper mill. By the 1980s, the old farm headquarters underwent structural renovations, designed by architects Hugo Segawa and Murillo Marques in 1982, to revitalize the collection. Access to the mansion is via a dirt road from Lagoa (about 25 kilometers away), located within the Klabin forestry property, approximately 6 km from the Alegre River. Public visitation is permitted under supervision, and appointments for specific groups can be made by contacting the company directly.

== Bibliography ==
- Alessandro Cavassin Alves (2014). The Province of Paraná (1853–1889) and the Political Class. Kinship in Government. Federal University of Paraná – Doctoral Thesis in Sociology.
- Anacília Carneiro da Cunha (1982). The Paper Man – Historical Analysis of Workers in the Klabin Industries of Paraná S/A 1942–1980. Federal University of Paraná.
- André Miguel Sidor Coraiola (2003). Capital of Paper – The History of the Municipality of Telêmaco Borba.
- Characteristic Aspects of the Municipality of Tibagi. Tibagi Municipal Government. 2015.
- Carlos Heitor Cony, Sergio Lamarão, Rosa Maria Canha (2001). Wolff Klabin: The Trajectory of a Pioneer – The Largest Paper Factory in the Country. FGV Editora.
- David Carneiro (1941). The Drama of the Fortaleza Farm. Dicesar Plaisan.
- Hellê Vellozo Fernandes (1973). Monte Alegre City-Paper. Book. 1. 236 pages.
- History of Tibagi. Tibagi Municipal Government. 1934.
- History of Telêmaco Borba. Telêmaco Borba Municipal Government. 2017.
- Historians of Paraná. Historical, Geographical, and Ethnographic Institute of Paraná. 1982.
- José Carlos Veiga Lopes (2004). Farms and Sites of Castro and Carambeí. Torre de Papel.
- Karine Karoline Goltz (2012). Telêmaco Borba School Group of Tibagi/PR (1915). Unicamp.
- Márcia Zamariano (2006). Paranaense Toponymy from the Historical Period of 1648 to 1853. Free Books; UEL.
- Maria Nicolas (1984). 130 Years of Parliamentary Life in Paraná – Legislative Assemblies and Constituent Assemblies. 1854–1984. Official Press Department of the State – DIOE. Book. 2nd ed.
- Ricardo Costa de Oliveira (2001). The Silence of the Victors: Genealogy, Dominant Class, and State in Paraná. Moinho do Verbo Editora.
- Sandra C. Pacheco (15 July 2014). 160 Years Ago, the Legislative Assembly of Paraná Held Its Solemn Inaugural Session. Legislative Assembly of the State of Paraná.
- Telêmaco Borba – Ashes of the Past. Impact Magazine – Year XV, No. XXXIII. April 2013.
- Telma Barros Correia (1998). Industrial Core vs. Free City: Urban Projects of Klabin in Paraná. Pontifical Catholic University of Campinas – V *Seminar on the History of the City and Urbanism.
- Túlio Vargas (2001). The Maragato: The Legendary Life of Telêmaco Borba, Jurua Publisher.
