= The Lero-Lero Family =

1953 film directed by Alberto Pieralisi

- Directed by: Alberto Pieralisi
- Written by: Alinor Azevedo; Raymundo Magalhães Jr. (play); Gustavo Nonnenberg; Alberto Pieralisi
- Produced by: Vitorio Cusani; Henri de Zeppelin
- Cinematography: Edgar Eichhorn
- Edited by: Carla Civelli; Oswald Hafenrichter
- Music by: Gabriel Migliori
- Production company: Vera Cruz Studios
- Distributed by: Columbia Pictures
- Release date: 14 September 1953
- Running time: 80 minutes
- Country: Brazil
- Language: Portuguese

The Lero-Lero Family (Portuguese: A Família Lero-Lero) is a 1953 Brazilian comedy film directed by Alberto Pieralisi and starring Walter D'Ávila, Marina Freire and Luiz Linhares.

== Plot ==
Aquiles Taveira is a disgruntled civil servant who feels exploited by his wife and their three adult children, Teteco, Janjão, and Laurita. He is also disregarded by his neighbors and at work, where he spends months complaining about a hole in the floor without his requests for repairs being addressed. After his children fail in their attempts to pursue careers in the arts and sports, they continue to reject ordinary jobs with the support of their mother. Frustrated with his family situation, Aquiles allows himself to be blamed for a 50,000-cruzeiro embezzlement at his workplace and flees to Guarujá, where he stays at a casino hotel and tries his luck at roulette.

== Partial cast ==
- Walter D'Ávila as Aquiles Taveira
- Marina Freire as Isolina
- Luiz Linhares as Teteco
- Ricardo Bandeira as Janjão
- Helena Barreto Leite as Laurita
- Elísio de Albuquerque as Laranjeira
- Renato Consorte
- Marly Bueno

== Bibliography ==
- Shaw, Lisa & Dennison, Stephanie. Brazilian National Cinema. Routledge, 2014.
