= Cara de Fogo =

1958 film

- Directed by: Galileu Garcia
- Written by: Afonso Schmidt; Galileu Garcia
- Produced by: Alfredo Palácios
- Starring: Alberto Ruschel
- Cinematography: Rudolf Icsey
- Release date: 24 December 1958
- Running time: 87 minutes
- Country: Brazil
- Language: Portuguese

Cara de Fogo is a 1958 Brazilian adventure film directed by Galileu Garcia. It was entered into the 1st Moscow International Film Festival.

== Cast ==
- Alberto Ruschel as Luís
- Milton Ribeiro as Gadanho
- Lucy Reis as Mariana
- Ana Maria Nabuco as Rosalina
- Gilberto Chagas as Zé Pachola
- Eugenio Kusnet as Tonico
- Jose de Jesús as Pedrinho
