= Companhia Cinematográfica Vera Cruz =

Brazilian film company

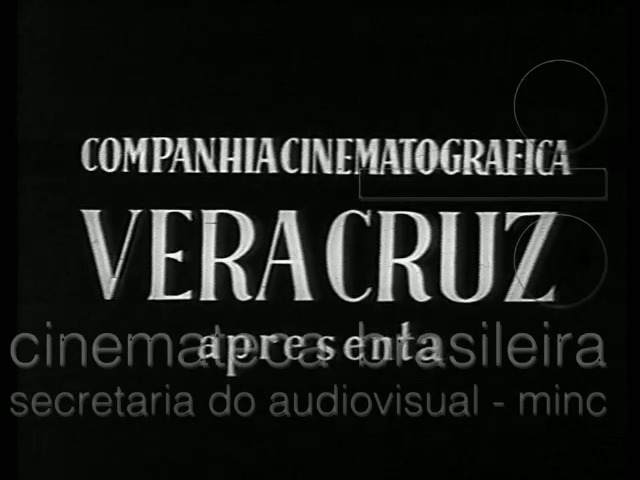
- Company type: Private
- Industry: Cinema
- Founded: 1949; 77 years ago
- Defunct: 1954; 72 years ago
- Headquarters: São Bernardo do Campo, SP, Brazil
- Area served: Brazil
- Key people: Franco Zampari and Francisco Matarazzo Sobrinho

Companhia Cinematográfica Vera Cruz was an important Brazilian film studio founded in 1949 and closed in 1954. Located in São Bernardo do Campo, it was created by the industrialists Franco Zampari and Francisco Matarazzo Sobrinho. The company produced and coproduced more than 40 feature films, including O Cangaceiro, one of the most successful movies in the Brazilian cinema's history.

== Films ==
- Painel - 1950 - short documentary directed por Lima Barreto
- Santuário - 1950 - short documentary directed by Lima Barreto
- Caiçara - 1950 - feature film directed by Adolfo Celi
- Ângela - 1951 - feature film directed by Abílio Pereira de Almeida and Tom Payne
- Terra é sempre terra - 1951 - feature film directed by Tom Payne
- Appassionata - 1952 - feature film directed by Fernando de Barros
- Veneno - 1952 - feature film directed by Gianni Pons
- Tico-Tico no Fubá - 1952 - feature film directed by Adolfo Celi
- Sai da frente - 1952 - feature film directed by Abílio Pereira de Almeida
- Nadando em dinheiro - 1952 - feature film directed by Abílio Pereira de Almeida and Carlos Thiré
- Sinhá Moça - 1953 - feature film directed by Tom Payne
- A Família Lero-Lero - 1953 - feature film directed by Alberto Pieralise and Gustavo Nonnemberg
- O Cangaceiro - 1953 - feature film directed by Luciano Salce
- Uma Pulga na Balança - 1953 - feature film directed by Luciano Salce
- Esquina da Ilusão- 1953 - feature film directed by Ruggero Jacobbi
- Luz apagada - 1953 - feature film directed by Carlos Thiré
- Obras Novas - 1953 - short documentary about new installations in the Vera Cruz's studios
- É Proibido Beijar - 1954 - feature film directed by Ugo Lombardi
- Na Senda do Crime - 1954 - feature film directed by Flaminio Bollini Cerri
- Candinho - 1954 - feature film directed by Abílio Pereira de Almeida
- Floradas na Serra - 1954 - feature film directed by Luciano Salce
- São Paulo em festa - 1954 - full-length documentary directed by Lima Barreto
