= Carlos Arthur Thiré =

Brazilian set designer, filmmaker, costume designer, and artist

- Born: 9 October 1917; Rio de Janeiro
- Died: 11 March 1963 (aged 45); Rio de Janeiro
- Occupation: Comics artist, illustrator, painter
- Spouse(s): Tônia Carrero
- Children: Cecil Thiré
- Awards: Troféu Angelo Agostini for Master of National Comics (1998)

Carlos Arthur Thiré (Rio de Janeiro, October 9, 1917 – Rio de Janeiro, March 11, 1963) was a Brazilian set designer, filmmaker, costume designer, painter and comics artist. His father is actor Cecil Thiré. He began his career as an illustrator in the 1930s at the newspaper A Noite, having been nominated to this work by Júlio César de Mello e Souza, a family friend. Thiré created the comics strip Raffles, whose comic books were published by Adolfo Aizen at Grande Consórcio de Suplementos Nacionais publishing house. He also created comics for the magazine O Tico-Tico, but, around the 1940s, he left comics to focus on his work as an actor and, later, in 1949, as a set designer, screenwriter and director at Companhia Cinematográfica Vera Cruz. In 1998, he was posthumously awarded with the Prêmio Angelo Agostini for Master of National Comics, an award that aims to honor artists who have dedicated themselves to Brazilian comics for at least 25 years.
