= A Flea on the Scales =

1953 film directed by Luciano Salce

- Film poster
- Directed by: Luciano Salce
- Written by: Fabio Carpi; Carlos Vergueiro
- Produced by: Vitorio Cusani
- Cinematography: Ugo Lombardi
- Edited by: Mauro Alice; Oswald Hafenrichter
- Music by: Enrico Simonetti
- Production company: Vera Cruz Studios
- Release date: 15 April 1953
- Running time: 90 minutes
- Country: Brazil
- Language: Portuguese

A Flea on the Scales (Portuguese: Uma Pulga na Balança) is a 1953 Brazilian comedy film directed by Luciano Salce and starring Waldemar Wey, Gilda Nery and Geraldo José de Almeida.

== Cast ==
- Waldemar Wey as Dorival
- Gilda Nery as Dora
- Geraldo José de Almeida
- Vicente Leporace
- José Rubens
- Ruy Afonso
- Geraldo Ambrosi
- Francisco Arisa
- Paulo Autran as Antenor
- Tito Livio Baccarin
- Jaime Barcellos
- Maurício Barroso
- Xandó Batista
- Célia Biar
- Lola Brah as Bibi
- Luiz Calderaro as Carlos
- Dan Camara
- Nelson Camargo
- Benjamin Cattan
- Benedito Corsi
- Maria Augusta Costa Leite
- João Costa
- Armando Couto
- Antônio Dourado
- Kleber Menezes Dória
- Marcelo Fiori
- Antônio Fragoso
- João Franco
- Felício Fuchs
- Galileu Garcia
- João Batista Giotti
- Wanda Hamel
- John Herbert as Alberto
- Artur Herculano
- Roberto Lombardi
- Edith Lorena
- Labiby Madi
- Cavagnole Neto
- Lima Neto
- Antonio Olinto
- Geraldo Santos Pereira
- João Rosa
- Pilade Rossi
- Jesuíno Santos
- Mário Senna
- Erminio Spalla
- Vicente Spalla
- Maria Luiza Splendore
- Michael Stoll
- Mário Sergio as Juvenal
- Francisco Tamura
- Francisco Taricano
- Eva Wilma
- Fausto Zip

== Bibliography ==
- Moliterno, Gino. The A to Z of Italian Cinema. Scarecrow Press, 2009.
