= 1953 Cannes Film Festival =

- Official poster of the 6th Cannes Film Festival, an original illustration by Jean-Luc.
- Opening film: Endless Horizons
- Location: Cannes, France
- Founded: 1946
- Awards: Grand Prize of the Festival: The Wages of Fear
- No. of films: 35 (In Competition)
- Festival date: 15 April 1953 – 29 April 1953
- Website: festival-cannes.com/en

Cannes Film Festival
- 1954 1952

The 6th Cannes Film Festival took place from 15 to 29 April 1953. French writer and filmmaker Jean Cocteau served as jury president for the main competition.

The Grand Prize of the Festival was awarded, as the highest prize, to The Wages of Fear by Henri-Georges Clouzot.

During the opening ceremony, Walt Disney was awarded the "Legion of Honour" from the hands of Monsieur Hugues, Minister of Information of France.

The festival opened with Endless Horizons by Jean Dréville.

== Juries ==
=== Main Competition ===
- Jean Cocteau, French writer and filmmaker - Jury President
- Louis Chauvet, French writer and journalist
- Titina De Filippo, Italian actress and writer
- Guy Desson, French MP official
- Philippe Erlanger, French
- Renée Faure, French actress
- Jacques-Pierre Frogerais, French
- Abel Gance, French filmmaker
- André Lang, French
- Georges Raguis, French union official
- Edward G. Robinson, American actor
- Charles Spaak, Belgian screenwriter
- Georges Van Parys, French composer

=== Short Films Competition ===
- Bert Haanstra, Dutch filmmaker
- Roger Leenhardt, French writer and filmmaker
- René Lucot, French
- Jean Queval, French journalist
- Jacques Schiltz, French
- Jean Vivie, French journalist

== Official Selection ==
=== Main Competition ===
The following feature films competed for the Grand Prix:

English title	Original title	Director(s)	Production country
1. April 2000		Wolfgang Liebeneiner	Austria
Awaara	Awāra	Raj Kapoor	India
The Bandit of Brazil	O Cangaceiro	Lima Barreto	Brazil
Barabbas		Alf Sjöberg	Sweden
Bongolo	Bongolo et la princesse noire	André Cauvin	Belgium
Call Me Madam		Walter Lang	United States
Children of Hiroshima	原爆の子	Kaneto Shindo	Japan
Come Back, Little Sheba		Daniel Mann	United States
Dedication of the Great Buddha	大仏開眼	Teinosuke Kinugasa	Japan
Doña Francisquita		Ladislao Vajda	Spain
Él		Luis Buñuel	Mexico
Emergency Ward	Sala de guardia	Tulio Demicheli	Argentina
Endless Horizons (opening film)	Horizons sans fin	Jean Dréville	France
Flamenco	Duende y misterio del flamenco	Edgar Neville	Spain
For the Sake of My Intemperate Youth	För min heta ungdoms skull	Arne Mattsson	Sweden
Gendai-jin	現代人	Minoru Shibuya	Japan
Green Magic	Magia verde	Gian Gaspare Napolitano	Italy, Brazil
The Heart of the Matter		George More O'Ferrall	United Kingdom
I Confess		Alfred Hitchcock	United States
Intimate Relations		Charles Frank	United Kingdom
Light in the High Plains	Luz en el páramo	Víctor Urruchúa	Venezuela
Lili		Charles Walters	United States
Monsieur Hulot's Holiday	Les Vacances de Monsieur Hulot	Jacques Tati	France
Perfidy	Nevjera	Vladimir Pogačić	Yugoslavia
Peter Pan		Hamilton Luske, Clyde Geronimi and Wilfred Jackson	United States
Rossana	La red	Emilio Fernández	Mexico
The Sun Shines Bright		John Ford	United States
Terminal Station	Stazione Termini	Vittorio De Sica	Italy, United States
The Three Perfect Wives	Las Tres perfectas casadas	Roberto Gavaldón	Mexico
La vie passionnée de Clémenceau		Gilbert Prouteau	France
The Village	Sie fanden eine Heimat	Leopold Lindtberg	Switzerland, United Kingdom
The Wages of Fear	Le Salaire de la peur	Henri-Georges Clouzot	France, Italy
The Wayward Wife	La provinciale	Mario Soldati	Italy
Welcome Mr. Marshall!	¡Bienvenido, Mister Marshall!	Luis García Berlanga	Spain
The White Reindeer	Valkoinen peura	Erik Blomberg	Finland

=== Short Films Competition ===
The following short films competed for the Short Film Grand Prix:

- ...And Now Miguel by Joseph Krumgold
- Castilla, soldado de la ley by Enrico Gras
- Doderhultarn by Olle Hellbom
- Doh pyi daung su by Jules Bucher
- Dubrovnik by Milan Katic
- Gazouly, petit oiseau by Wladyslaw Starewicz, L. Starewitcz
- Houen zo! by Herman van der Horst
- I cristalli by Lando Colombo
- Immagini e colore by Vittorio Sala
- Joy of Living by Jean Oser
- Kujira by Noburô Ôhfuji
- Kumaon Hills by Mohan Dayaram Bhavnani
- La montagna di genere by Giovanni Paolucci
- La pintura mural Mexicana by Francisco del Villar
- Land Of The Long Day by Douglas Wilkinson
- Le Luxembourg et son industrie by Philippe Schneider
- Le voyage d'Abdallah by Georges Régnier
- Machu-Picchu by Enrico Gras
- Marionnettes de Toon by Jean Cleinge
- Meister der Gegenwart by Karl von Zieglmayer
- Momoyama bidsutsu by Sôya Mizuki
- Naskara by José Miguel De Mora
- New Lands for Old by Krishna Gopal
- Pescatori di laguna by Antonio Petrucci
- Peter Breughel L'Ancien by Arcady
- Présentation de la beauce à Notre Dame de Chartres by Jacques Berthier
- Pylone 138 by Adolphe Forter
- Remnants of a Stone-Age People by Louis Knobel
- Reverón by Margot Benacerraf
- Royal Heritage by Diana Pine
- Salut Casa! by Jean Vidal
- Schatten Uner Sternen by Ernest Bingen
- So ist das Saarland by Ernest Bingen
- The Figurehead by John Halas
- The Great Experiment by V.R. Sarma
- The Romance of Transportation in Canada by Colin Low
- The Settler by Bernard Devlin
- The Stranger Left No Card by Wendy Toye
- Varen by Gösta Werner
- Victoire sur L'Annapurna by Marcel Ichac
- Vincent Van Gogh by Jan Hulsker
- Water Birds by Ben Sharpsteen
- White Mane (Crin Blanc, Cheval Sauvage) by Albert Lamorisse

== Official Awards ==
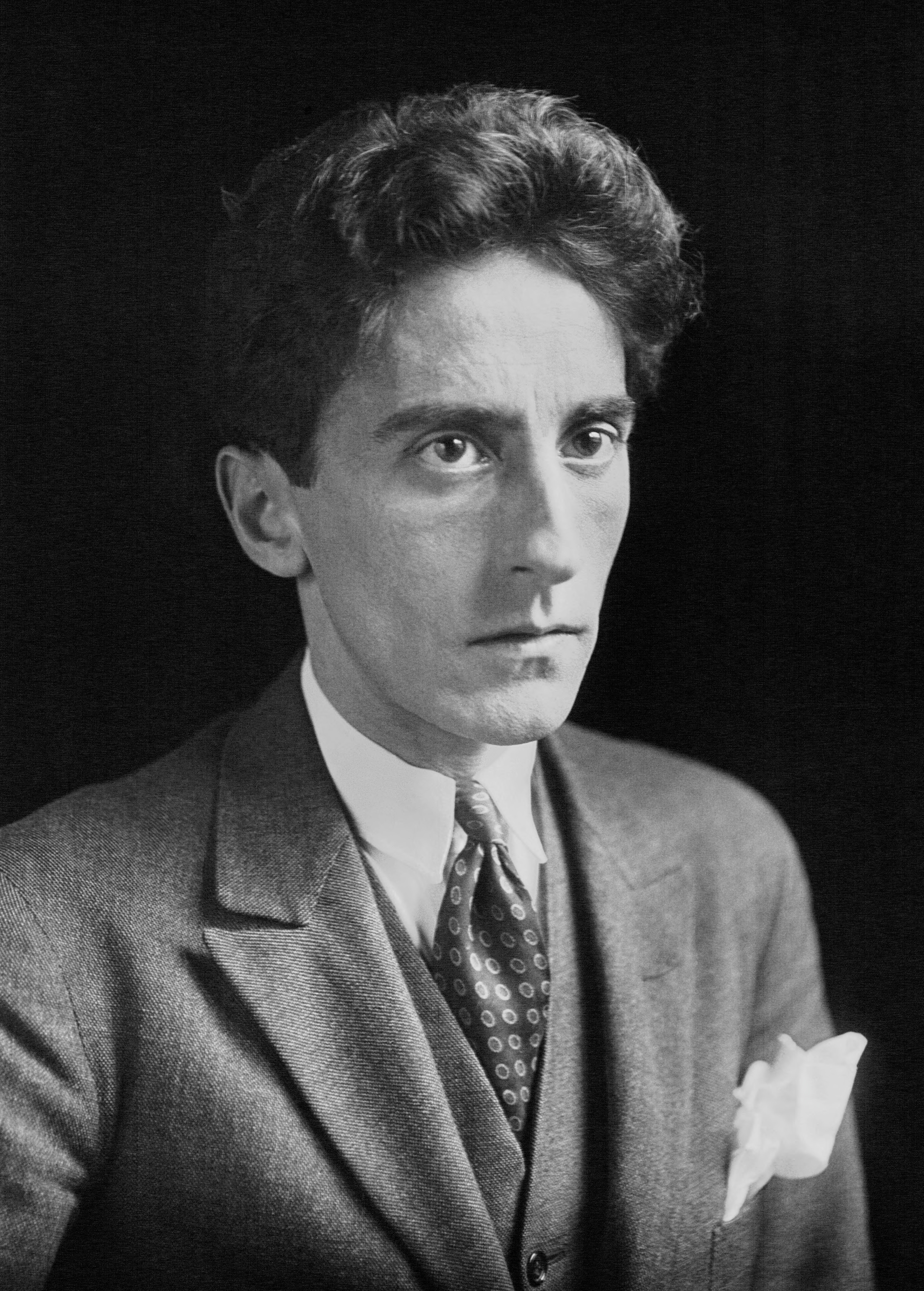
Jean Cocteau, Jury President

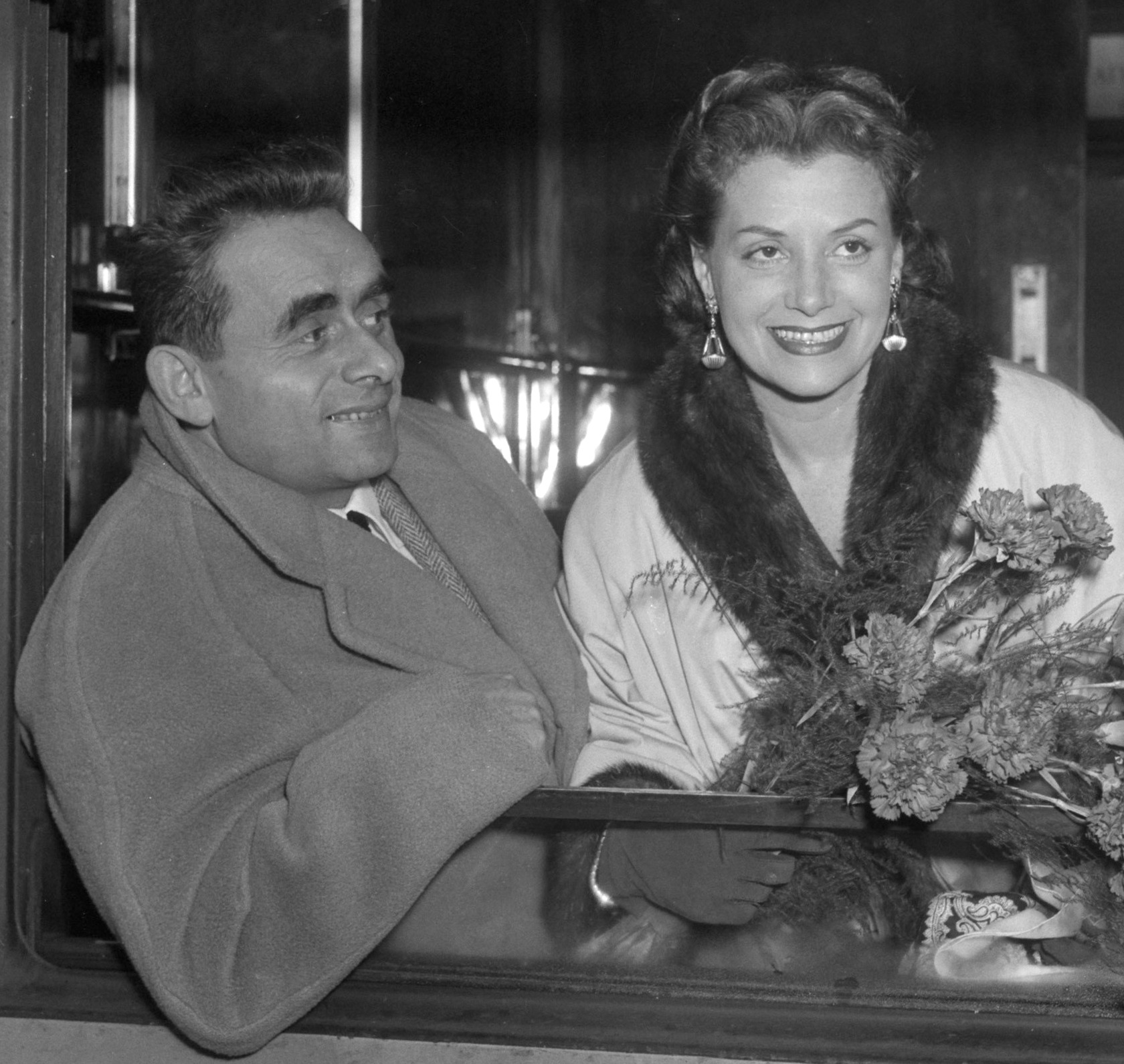
Henri-Georges (& Vera) Clouzot, Grand Prix winner

=== Main Competition ===
- Grand Prix: The Wages of Fear by Henri-Georges Clouzot
- International Awards:
  - Award of Visual Narration: Rosanna by Emilio Fernández
  - Award of Exploration Film: Green Magic by Gian Gaspare Napolitano
  - Award of Fairy Tale Film: The White Reindeer by Erik Blomberg
  - Award of Entertainment Film: Lili by Charles Walters
  - Award of Good Humour: Welcome Mr. Marshall! by Luis García Berlanga
  - Award of Adventure Film: O Cangaceiro by Lima Barreto
  - Award of Dramatic Film: Come Back, Little Sheba by Daniel Mann
- Special Mention:
  - Shirley Booth for Come Back, Little Sheba
  - Charles Vanel for The Wages of Fear
  - Juan Antonio Bardem, Luis García Berlanga and Miguel Mihura for the screenplay of Welcome Mr. Marshall!
  - Gabriel Migliori for the score of O Cangaceiro
  - For the charming acting in Lili
  - For the use of colour in Green Magic
- Jury Special Prize - Legion of Honour: Walt Disney
- Homage: Flamenco by Edgar Neville

=== Short Films Competition ===
- Short Film Grand Prix: White Mane by Albert Lamorisse
- Best Fictional Film: The Stranger Left No Card by Wendy Toye
- Best Documentary Film: Houen zo! by Herman van der Horst
- Best Film on Art: Doderhultarn by Olle Hellbom
- Best Animation: The Romance of Transportation in Canada by Colin Low

== Independent Awards ==
=== FIPRESCI Prize ===
- Monsieur Hulot's Holiday by Jacques Tati

=== OCIC Award ===
- Endless Horizons by Jean Dréville

== Media ==
- Institut National de l'Audiovisuel: Opening of the 1953 festival (commentary in French)
