= Enrico Simonetti =

Italian composer

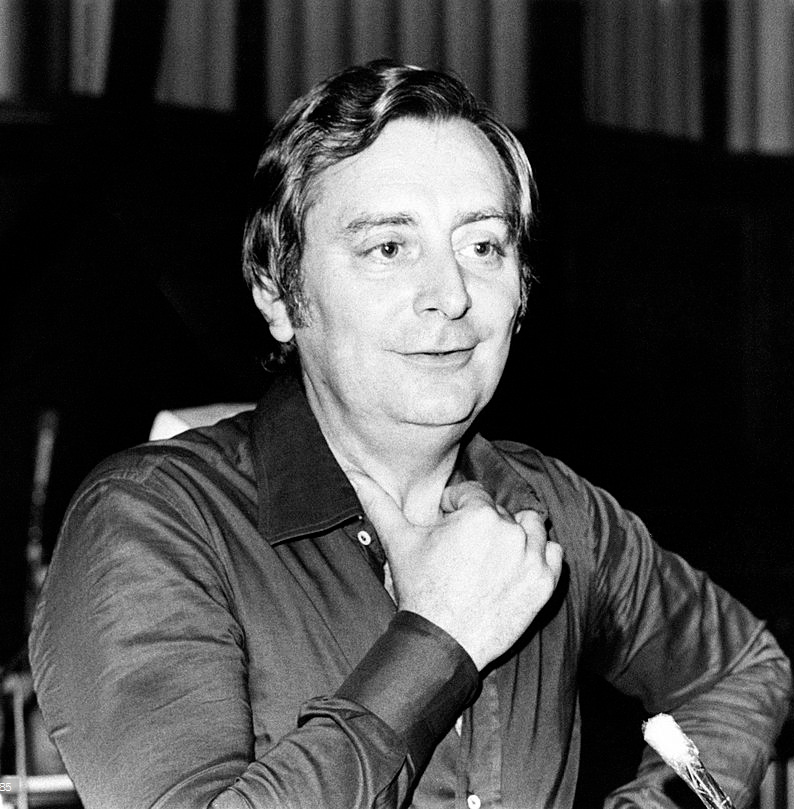
- Born: 29 January 1924; Alassio
- Died: 28 May 1978 (aged 54); Rome

Enrico Simonetti (29 January 1924 – 28 May 1978) was an Italian pianist, composer, conductor, and television and radio presenter.

== Life and career ==
Born in Alassio, a Province of Savona, Simonetti studied piano at the Santa Cecilia Conservatory in Rome. A lover of jazz, in the early 1950s he founded a jazz band with Piero Piccioni and Bruno Martino, with whom he performed in the most important nightclubs of the time. In 1953 he moved, with his family, to Brazil, where he found immediate success as musician, composer and entertainer, hosting a long running television program, Simonetti Show, which lasted for 147 episodes; thanks to his popularity he was made an honorary citizen of Brazil and was introduced into the "Candido Randon da Silva" order. In 1964 he came back to Italy, where he joined RAI television, making his debut in the show Chitarra, amore mio. He was active as a television and radio host (often paired with Isabella Biagini), as a film composer, and even an occasional actor. Simonetti died at age 54 from complications following a major surgical operation to remove a tumor in his throat.

He was the father of composer and musician Claudio Simonetti.

== Selected filmography ==
- Lights Out (1953)
- A Flea on the Scales (1953)
- Leonora of the Seven Seas (1955)
- Macumba Love (1960)
- I Kiss the Hand (1973)
- Special Killers (1973)
- Il magnate (1973)
- Don't Hurt Me, My Love (1974)
- Lover Boy (1975)
- Per amore di Cesarina (1976)
- Scandalo in famiglia (1976)
