= Amácio Mazzaropi =

Brazilian actor and filmmaker (1912–1981)

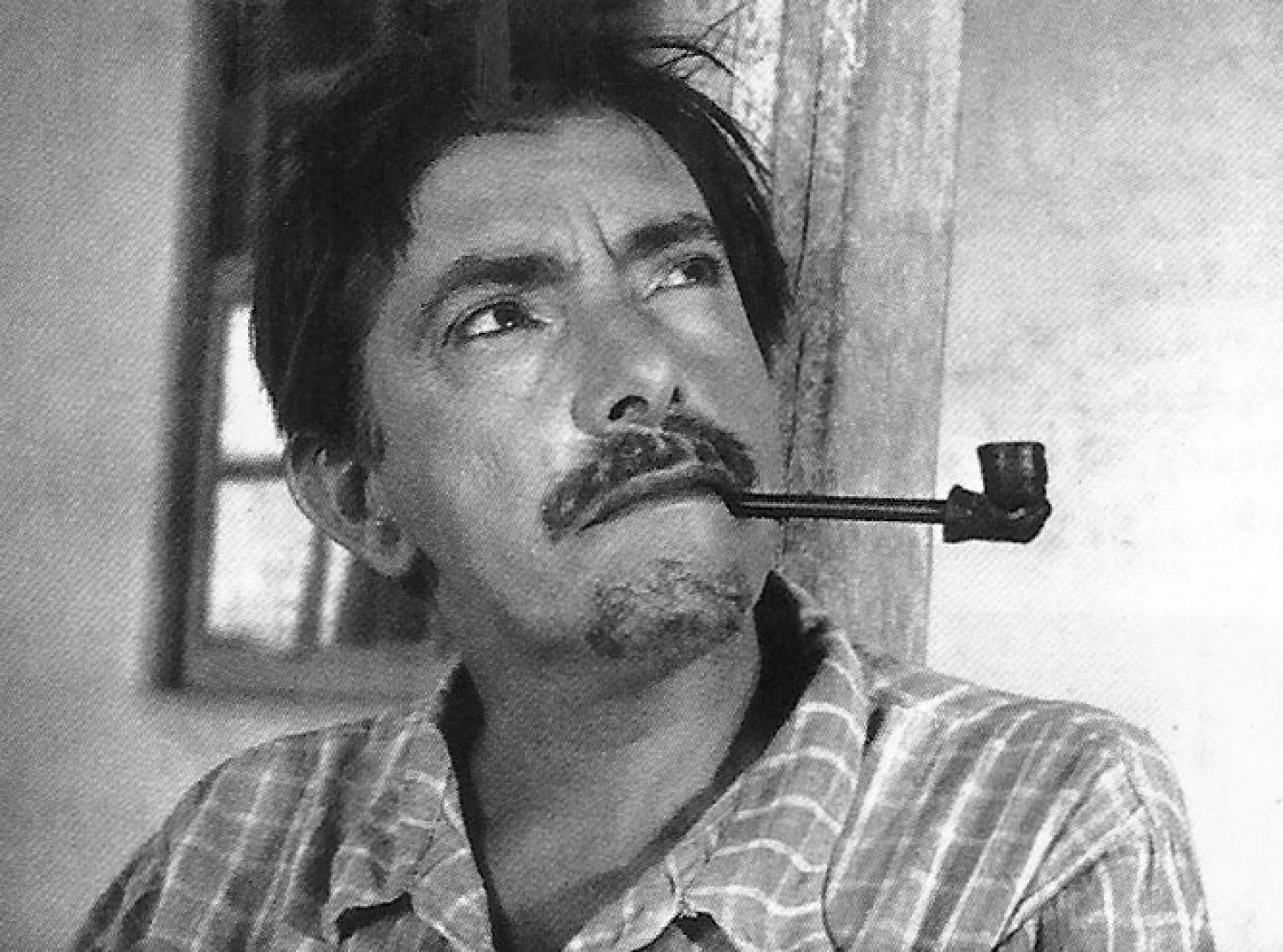
- Mazzaropi, in a scene of Tristeza do Jeca (1961)
- Born: April 9, 1912; São Paulo, Brazil
- Died: June 13, 1981 (aged 69); São Paulo, Brazil
- Occupations: Actor, Film director, Singer
- Parent(s): Bernardo Mazzaroppi, Clara Ferreira

Amácio Mazzaropi (April 9, 1912 – June 13, 1981) was a Brazilian actor and filmmaker.

== Biography ==
A comic performer from a circus background, he became popular in Brazil with his character Jeca Tatu, a portrayal of the Caipira of the 20th century, originally created by the writer Monteiro Lobato. Mazzaropi debuted in cinema in 1951, with Sai da Frente. In 1958 he established his own film studio, PAM Filmes, producing and distributing his own movies.

He died in São Paulo on June 13, 1981, of bone marrow cancer.

== Tribute ==
On April 9, 2021, Google celebrated his 109th birthday with a Google Doodle.

== Filmography ==
- Sai da frente (1952) as Isidoro Colepicola
- Nadando em dinheiro (1952) as Isidoro Colepícula
- Candinho (1954) as Candinho
- A Carrocinha (1955) as Jacinto
- Fuzileiro do Amor (1956) as José Ambrósio / Ambrósio José
- Chico Fumaça (1956) as Chico Fumaça
- O Gato de Madame (1957) as Arlindo Pinto
- O Noivo da Girafa (1958) as Aparício
- Chofer de Praça (1959) as Zacarias
- Zé do Periquito (1960) as Zenó, o Zé do Periquito
- Jeca Tatu (1960) as Jeca
- As Aventuras de Pedro Malasartes (1960) as Pedro Malazartes
- Tristeza do Jeca (1961) as Jeca
- O Vendedor de Linguiça (1962) as Gustavo
- Casinha Pequenina (1963) as Chico
- O Lamparina (1964) as Bernardino Jabá
- O puritano da rua Augusta (1965) as Punduroso
- Meu Japão Brasileiro (1965) as Fofuca
- O corintiano (1967) as Manoel (Seu Mané)
- O Jeca e a freira (1968) as Sigismundo, o Jeca
- Uma pistola para Djeca (1969) as Gumercindo
- No paraíso das solteironas (1969) as Joaquim Kabrito / J.K.
- Betão Ronca Ferro (1971) as Betão
- O grande xerife (1972) as Inácio Pororoca
- Um caipira em Bariloche (1973) as Polidoro
- Portugal, minha saudade (1974) as Sabino
- O Cineasta das Platéias (1975)
- O jeca macumbeiro (1975) as Pirola
- Jeca contra o Capeta (1976) as Poluído
- Jecão...um fofoqueiro no céu (1977) as Jecão
- O Jeca e seu filho preto (1978) as Zé
- A Banda das Velhas Virgens (1979) as Gostoso
- O Jeca e a égua milagrosa (1980) as Raimundo
- Maria Tomba Homem - (not finished)
