= O Cangaceiro =

1953 Brazilian adventure western film

- Film poster
- Directed by: Lima Barreto
- Written by: Lima Barreto; Rachel de Queiroz
- Produced by: Cid Leite da Silva; Alberto Cavalcanti
- Starring: Alberto Ruschel
- Cinematography: H.E. Fowle
- Edited by: Giuseppe Baldacconi; Oswald Hafenrichter (montage)
- Music by: Gabriel Migliori
- Production company: Vera Cruz
- Distributed by: Columbia Pictures
- Release date: January 20, 1953
- Running time: 105 minutes
- Country: Brazil
- Language: Portuguese
- Box office: ₢$30 million (US$1.5 million)

O Cangaceiro (lit. "The Cangaceiro"; also known as The Bandit and The Bandits) is a 1953 Brazilian adventure Western film directed by Lima Barreto. After some reluctance by its studio Vera Cruz, Barreto shot it in 1952. After its release it was a national and international success, and won several awards, including the Adventure Film Award at the 1953 Cannes Film Festival. It was poorly received in retrospect despite being praised by the time of its release and started a subgenre in Brazilian cinema.

== Cast ==
- Alberto Ruschel as Teodoro
- Marisa Prado as Olívia
- Milton Ribeiro as Galdino
- Vanja Orico as Maria Clódia
- Adoniran Barbosa as Mané Mole

== Production ==
In 1950, Lima Barreto joined the film studio Companhia Cinematográfica Vera Cruz invited by its then president Alberto Cavalcanti. After releasing two documentaries successfully for the studio, Painel and Santuário, Barreto get the chance to direct a feature film. With the idea to shoot a film about Lampião since the early 1940s, he only commenced to shoot it in 1952 after some reluctance by Franco Zampari, Vera Cruz's founder. Although he went to Bahia and did some research there, it was shot in Vargem Grande do Sul, São Paulo, with a production that lasted nine months due to internal conflicts.

== Reception ==
O Cangaceiro was released on January 20, 1953, and was a public success; it grossed ₢$30 million (about US$1.5 million) in the 24 Brazilian theaters in which it spent six weeks. After its national success, it was distributed to over 80 countries, becoming one of the most internationally successful Brazilian films—a feat uncommon in that time. It led it to be considered Vera Cruz's "high point" and its "most important production" by Georges Sadoul, author of Dictionary of Films, and by O Estado de S. Paulo's Luiz Zanin, respectively.

After winning several Brazilian awards, the film was entered into the 1953 Cannes Film Festival, where it was "much liked for its original and truly national flavour." O Cangaceiro won the Best Adventure Film Award, making it the first Brazilian film to win a prize at Cannes, and received a special mention to Gabriel Migliori's musical composition. At the Edinburgh International Film Festival it was awarded the Best Film.

It received mixed commentaries since its release. It was once voted the best Brazilian film in 1968 by National Film Institute's magazine Revista Film Cultura. Sadoul declared, "Lima Barreto well conveys a sense of poetry of the open desert space of the Sertão and makes this story lively and suspenseful". After praising its cast performances and its "thrilling" musical score, Bosley Crowther of The New York Times said, "This [O] Cangaceiro is a picture that will cause the Western fans to rub their eyes." However, Cinema Novo representants—mainly Glauber Rocha—would criticize it for borrowing too much the style of American films. Critics also went on to comment on its "sociological inaccuracies."

== Legacy ==
It is the first film to mix cangaço with Western, starting a genre called "Nordestern" —an amalgam of the words "Nordeste" (Northeast) and "Western". It would be followed by successful films such as Carlos Coimbra's A Morte Comanda o Cangaço (1960), Lampião, o Rei do Cangaço (1964) and Corisco, o Diabo Louro (1969), and Aurélio Teixeira's Os Três Cabras de Lampião. It also established cangaço as a subgenre in Brazilian cinema; subsequently, cangaço would be featured as a theme from comedy—such as Os Três Cangaceiro and O Lamparina—to pornochanchada films—As Cangaceiras Eróticas and A Ilha das Cangaceiras Virgens. Also, Ruschel and Ribeiro would reprise the role of "good cangaceiro" and "bad cangaceiro" in other films.
