= Caiçara (film) =

1950 film

- Theatrical release poster
- Directed by: Adolfo Celi; Tom Payne; John Waterhouse
- Written by: Alberto Cavalcanti; Adolfo Celi; Ruggero Jacobbi
- Produced by: Alberto Cavalcanti
- Starring: Eliane Lage; Abílio Pereira de Almeida; Carlos Vergueiro; Mário Sérgio
- Cinematography: H. E. Fowle
- Edited by: Oswald Hafenrichter
- Music by: Francisco Mignone
- Production company: Vera Cruz
- Distributed by: Universal Filmes; Marte Filmes
- Release date: 1 November 1950
- Running time: 92 minutes
- Country: Brazil
- Language: Portuguese

Caiçara is a 1950 Brazilian drama film co-directed by Adolfo Celi, Tom Payne, and John Waterhouse. It was nominated for the Grand Prize of the Festival at the 1951 Cannes Film Festival.

== Plot ==
Trapped in an unhappy marriage, Marina (Eliane Lage) finds herself the object of desire for her husband's business partner, Manuel (Carlos Vergueiro). While the two men fight to the death over her, Marina finds love with a passing sailor, Alberto (Mário Sérgio).

== Cast ==
- Eliane Lage as Marina
- Abilio Pereira de Almeida as José Amaro
- Carlos Vergueiro as Manuel
- Mário Sérgio as Alberto
- Maria Joaquina da Rocha as Felicidade
- Adolfo Celi as Genovês
- Vera Sampaio
- Célia Biar
- Renato Consorte
- Luiz Calderaro
- José Mauro de Vasconcelos
- Zilda Barbosa as Diretora do orfanato

== Production ==
It was shot between March and September 1950 in Ilhabela, São Paulo.
