= The Landowner's Daughter =

1953 film

- Directed by: Tom Payne; Oswaldo Sampaio
- Written by: Maria Camila Dezonne Pacheco Fernandes
- Produced by: Edgard Baptista Pereira
- Starring: Anselmo Duarte
- Cinematography: Ray Sturgess
- Edited by: Edith Hafenrichter
- Release date: 1953
- Running time: 120 minutes
- Country: Brazil
- Language: Portuguese

The Landowner's Daughter (Portuguese: Sinhá Moça) is a 1953 Brazilian drama film directed by Tom Payne and Oswaldo Sampaio. It was entered into the 4th Berlin International Film Festival. It is based on the novel by Brazilian author Maria Camila Dezonne Pacheco Fernandes.

== Cast ==
- Anselmo Duarte as Rodrigo
- Eliane Lage as Sinhá Moça
- Ruth de Souza as Sabina
- Ricardo Campos as Benedito
