= Carlos Coimbra =

Brazilian film editor

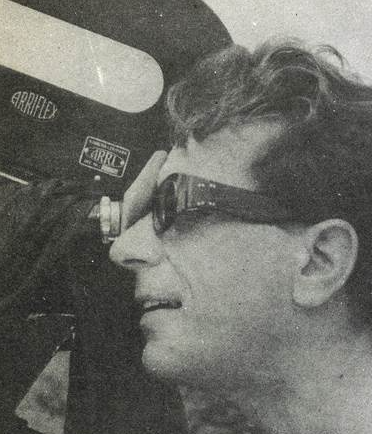
- Born: 1925; São Paulo, Brazil
- Died: 14 February 2007 (aged 81–82); São Paulo, Brazil
- Occupations: Film editor Film director Screenwriter
- Years active: 1955–1982

Carlos Coimbra (1925 – 14 February 2007) was a Brazilian film editor, director and screenwriter. His film A Morte Comanda o Cangaço was entered into the 11th Berlin International Film Festival.

== Selected filmography ==
- A Morte Comanda o Cangaço (1961)
