= Lima Barreto (director) =

Brazilian film director

- Born: 23 June 1906; São Paulo, Brazil
- Died: 23 November 1982 (aged 76); São Paulo, Brazil
- Occupations: Film director; screenwriter
- Years active: 1940–1982

Lima Barreto (23 June 1906 – 23 November 1982) was a Brazilian film director and screenwriter. He directed six films between 1940 and 1961. His film O Cangaceiro was entered into the 1953 Cannes Film Festival, where it was "much liked for its original and truly national flavour."

== Filmography ==
- Fazenda Velha (1940)
- Painel (1951)
- Santuário (1952)
- O Cangaceiro (1953)
- São Paulo em Festa (1954)
- A Primeira Missa (1961)
