= 4th Berlin International Film Festival =

1954 film festival in West Berlin, Germany

- Festival poster
- Location: West Berlin, Germany
- Founded: 1951
- Awards: Golden Bear: Hobson's Choice
- Festival date: 18–29 June 1954
- Website: www.berlinale.de

Berlin International Film Festival chronology
- 5th 3rd

The 4th annual Berlin International Film Festival was held from 18 to 29 June 1954. This year's festival did not give any official jury prizes, instead awards were given by audience voting. This continued until the FIAPF granted Berlin "A-Status" in 1956.

David Lean won the Golden Bear by the audience voting for his film Hobson's Choice.

== Main Competition ==
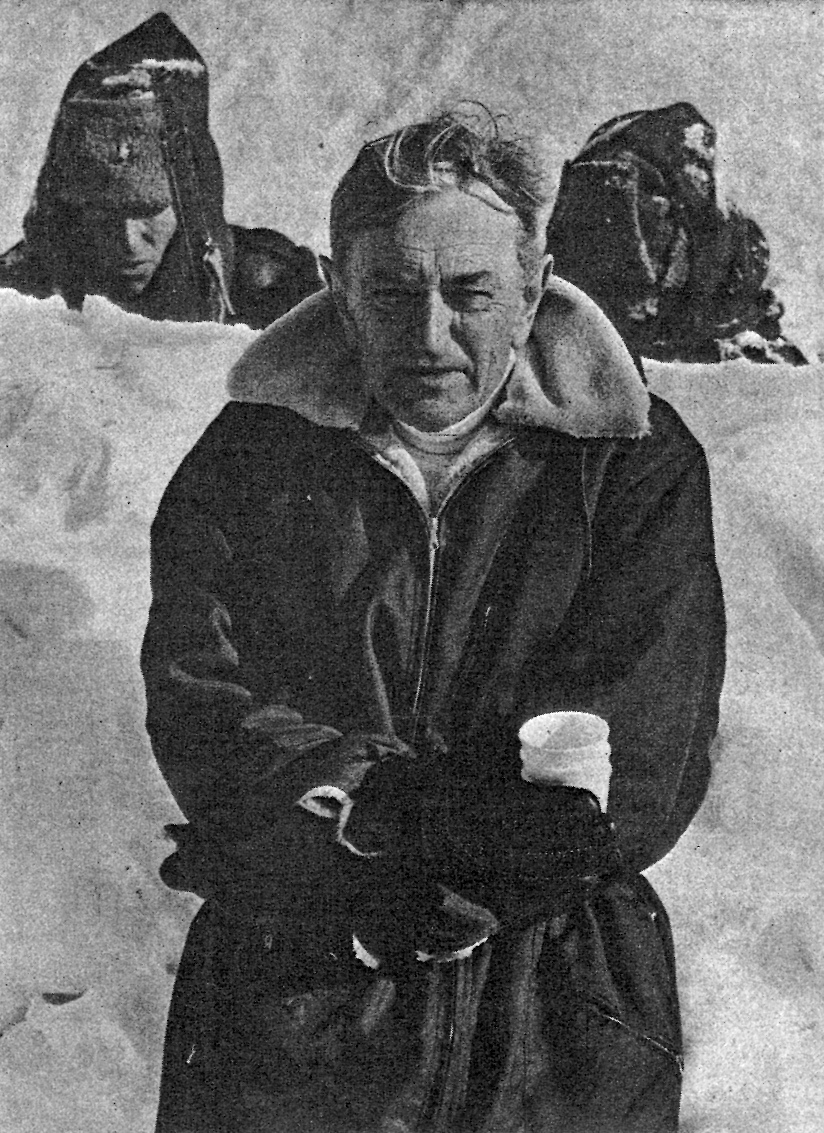
David Lean, winner of the Golden Bear at the event.

The following films were in competition for the Golden Bear award:

English title	Original title	Director(s)	Country
20,000 Leagues Under the Sea		Richard Fleischer	United States
Bread, Love and Dreams	Pane, amore e fantasia	Luigi Comencini	Italy
Circus of Love	Rummelplatz der Liebe	Kurt Neumann	West Germany, United States
Gate of Hell	地獄門	Teinosuke Kinugasa	Japan
The Golden Age of Flemish Painting	Een gouden eeuw-de kunst der Vlaamse primitieven	Paul Haesaerts	Belgium
The Great Adventure	Det stora äventyret	Arne Sucksdorff	Sweden
Hobson's Choice		David Lean	United Kingdom
Ikiru	生きる	Akira Kurosawa	Japan
The Landowner's Daughter	Sinhá Moça	Tom Payne and Oswaldo Sampaio	Brazil
The Living Desert		James Algar	United States
Magnificent Obsession		Douglas Sirk	United States
No Way Back	Weg ohne Umkehr	Victor Vicas	West Germany
Submarine Attack	La grande speranza	Duilio Coletti	Italy
The Unfrocked One	Le Défroqué	Léo Joannon	France

== Official Awards ==
=== Main Competition ===
The following prizes were awarded by audience votes:

- Golden Bear: Hobson's Choice by David Lean
- Silver Bear: Bread, Love and Dreams by Luigi Comencini
- Bronze Berlin Bear: The Unfrocked One by Léo Joannon
- Big Gold Medal (Documentaries and Culture Films): The Living Desert by James Algar
- Big Silver Medal (Documentaries and Culture Films): The Great Adventure by Arne Sucksdorff
- Big Bronze Medal (Documentaries and Culture Films): The Golden Age of Flemish Painting by Paul Haesaerts
