= Sai da frente =

1952 film directed by Abílio Pereira de Almeida

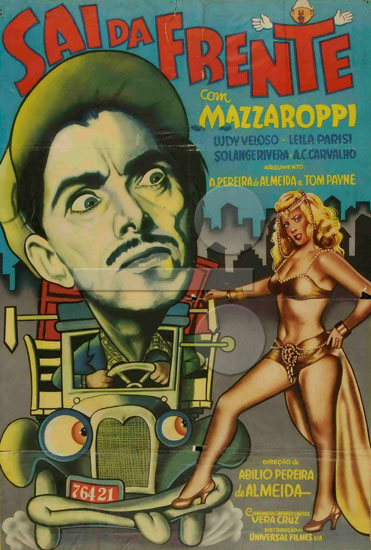
Poster

Sai da Frente is a Brazilian film, from 1952, which marks the debut of Mazzaropi in cinemas, hitherto artist of success in the circus, radio and television.

== Cast ==
- Amácio Mazzaropi .... Isidoro Colepicola
- Ludy Veloso .... Maria
- Leila Parisi
- A. C. Carvalho .... Eufrásio
- Nieta Junqueira .... Dona Gata
- Solange Rivera
- Luiz Calderaro
- Vicente Leporace
- Luiz Linhares
- Francisco Arisa
- Xandó Batista
- Bruno Barabani
- Danilo de Oliveira
- Renato Consorte
- Príncipes da Melodia
- José Renato
- Francisco Sá
- Príncipes da Melodia
- Danilo de Oliveira
- Bruno Barabani
- Joe Kantor
- Milton Ribeiro
- Jordano Martinelli
- Izabel Santos
- Maria Augusta Costa Leite
- Carlo Guglielmi
- Labiby Madi
- Jaime Pernambuco
- Galileu Garcia
- José Renato Pécora
- Tony Rabatoni
- Ayres Campos
- Dalmo de Melo Bordezan
- José Scatena
- Vitório Gobbis
- Olívio Melo
- Martins Melo
- Rosa Parisi
- Carmem Muller
- Annie Berrier
- Nôemia Soares
- Antônio Dourado
- Cão Duque (Coronel)
