= William H. Brown Jr. =

American television director

- Born: William Herbert Brown Jr. June 23, 1917; Portland, Maine, U.S.
- Died: June 8, 1982; aged 64; Portland, Maine, U.S.
- Other names: Bill Brown, B. A. Brown
- Education: Bowdoin College
- Occupations: television director and producer, radio dramatist, composer
- Years active: 1941–1961
- Spouse(s): Janet Pierce Johnson; 1941–?
- Children: 3

William Herbert Brown Jr. (June 23, 1917 – June 8, 1982) was an American television director and producer, a radio dramatist, and a composer, perhaps best known for his work on the 1950s CBS anthology series Climax! and Studio One.

== Early life and career ==
Born in Portland, Maine on June 23, 1917 (Note: In the 1920 U.S. census entries for the extended family of William A. Harrington (i.e. Brown's maternal grandfather, in whose home Brown's parents, William Sr. and Florence Brown—née Harrington—were then residing), Brown's age is given as 2 years, 6 months (or, as entered, 2 and 6/12). That, in conjunction with January 13, 1920 (that page's enumeration date), yields possible birth dates ranging from June 14 through July 13, 1917. Brown's parents' veracity—and command of basic math—would later be vindicated by the United States Social Security Death Index, which gives Brown's birth date as 23 Jun 1917.) Brown was the son of William Herbert Brown Sr. and Florence Harrington. He attended Deering High School and Bowdoin College, earning a Bachelor of Arts degree in music in 1939. It was while a sophomore at Bowdoin, prompted by the arrival of Professor Frederic Tillotson, that Brown first began to pursue music seriously, becoming—according to Evening Express TV writer Joe D. King—the first student in the history of Bowdoin College to elect music as a major, a milestone Brown promptly underlined by writing and staging one musical comedy in each of his final three years in college.

Following his graduation, Brown worked as music critic at the Portland Press Herald. In July 1941, his musical radio play Eight to the Bar, a tribute to boogie woogie and its pioneer, Pinetop Smith, aired over the NBC Red Network, starring Eddie Green and narrated by Canada Lee. The following March, Brown's satirical sketch "A Child's History of Hot Music" was heard on Columbia Workshop.

Brown made his TV directing debut on April 23, 1949, on NBC's The Hank Ladd Show (known prior to that date as The Arrow Show, restaffed and retitled accordingly), with prior host Phil Silvers and sidekick Jack Gilford replaced, respectively, by Hank Ladd and the pre-Life of Riley Jackie Gleason. Brown's next assignment came in August of that year, on composer Meredith Willson's self-titled, six-week series, which served as the summer replacement for NBC's The Aldrich Family. That fall, Brown became director of Paul Whiteman's Goodyear Revue,

In the fall of 1951, Brown—together with Frank Telford and Joseph Scibetta—became one of three alternating directors on Schlitz Playhouse of Stars, The following year, in episodes airing February 1 and May 16, respectively, he produced and directed the TV debuts of screen star Ann Sothern—in "Lady With a Will" (based on the like-named Ward Morehouse-Peggy Wood play)—and singer Polly Bergen.

In January 1954, Brown signed with CBS, succeeding John Claar as director of the sitcom Life With Father, based on the like-named Broadway play and its 1947 film adaptation. In October of that year, Brown helmed the series premiere of Climax!, "The Long Goodbye," based on Raymond Chandler's like-named novel. Guiding a cast led by Dick Powell, Teresa Wright, and Cesar Romero, Brown's direction was dubbed "imaginative and vigorous" by Hollywood Reporter critic Milton Luban, who described the work itself as "beautifully acted and directed, and loaded with suspense," and deemed the episode clearly superior to any of the previously released big screen Chandler adaptations.

In February 1955, Brown was moved from Climax! to Studio One. His first project there was "Donovan's Brain", an adaptation of Curt Siodmak's like-named novel, written by William Templeton and starring Wendell Corey and E. G. Marshall. Brown then directed Inger Stevens, Skip Homeier, and George Macready in the episode, "The Conviction of Peter Shea". In November 1956, Lee Remick starred as "The Landlady's Daughter," in an episode co-starring Richard Kiley, George Mathews, Fred Gwynne, Peg Hillias, and Crahan Denton, with Variety commending Gwynne's performance in particular and noting Brown's "nice sense for movement and atmosphere."

Beginning in 1960, Brown served as executive producer of Shirley Temple's Storybook.

== Personal life and death ==
On June 9, 1941, Brown married Janet Pierce Johnson at Boston's Trinity Church. Their union produced three children, all sons.

On June 8, 1982, 15 days before his 65th birthday, Brown died in a hospital in Portland. He was survived by his mother and three sons. His remains are interred at Evergreen Cemetery.
