= Donovan's Brain (Studio One) =

- Studio One episode
- Episode no.: Season 7 Episode 24
- Directed by: William H. Brown Jr.
- Written by: WilliamTempleton
- Based on: Donovan's Brain by Curt Siodmak
- Original air date: February 28, 1955

Episode chronology
← Previous "The Eddie Chapman Story"	Next → "Millions of Georges"

"Donovan's Brain " is an episode of the CBS television anthology series Studio One consisting of an hour-long adaptation of Curt Siodmak's 1942 science fiction novel of the same name. The episode was first broadcast February 28, 1955. Produced by Felix Jackson and directed by William H. Brown Jr., the episode starred Wendell Corey, E. G. Marshall, and June Dayton.

== Cast ==
Credits derived from February 26, 1955 issue of TV Guide's Chicago Edition.

- Dr. Cory – Wendell Corey
- Dr. Shratt - E. G. Marshall
- Janice - June Dayton
- Yocum – Don Hanmer
- Fuller – Lawrence Fletcher
- Hinds – John Reese
- Sara – Patsy Bruder
- Bank Manager – Charles Penman
- Nurse – Stanja Lowe

== Premise ==
A doctor living with his wife in the Arizona desert experiments with keeping newly expired monkeys' brains alive. When a nearby plane crash results in the doctor performing this procedure on a mortally injured millionaire, unforeseen and sinister complications ensue.

== Production ==
Unbeknownst to the then 69-year-old American composer Wallingford Riegger, passages from his Symphony No. 3—as recorded the previous year for Columbia Records by Howard Hanson, conducting the Eastman-Rochester Orchestra—comprised the episode's uncredited score.

== Critical reception ==
The Toronto Star's Gordon Sinclair praised the episode for commanding viewer interest despite its patently outlandish premise, an achievement he credits primarily to the performances of Wendell Corey, E. G. Marshall, and—as "an oily type of blackmailer in Peter Lorre makeup"—Don Hanmer, and to producer Felix Jackson for giving the show "a tense action, a meatily packed production from the camera angle, and a constancy of movement that kept us wondering."

16 days after the broadcast, Evening Express TV editor Joe D. King, in his extended profile of the episode's director, William H. Brown Jr., dubbed the Studio One presentation "one of the best suspense plays we have yet seen on TV."

Reporting for the International News Service, Jack O'Brian called the episode "an expert chiller," but one whose "TV impact" would likely be lessened by the fact that the old Von Stroheim-Vera Hruba version had been "dunking in the channels for TV generations," a point echoed by Kansas City Star TV editor R. J. Hoyland.

Cincinnati Enquirer TV editor James Devane cited the episode as a prime example of the growing tendency of TV anthology dramas to minimize or dispense altogether with opening intros in the interests of grabbing the attention of viewers who might otherwise be tempted to change stations in search of more familiar fare.

== See also ==
- The Lady and the Monster, 1944 theatrical film based on the same novel
- Donovan's Brain, 1953 theatrical film based on the same novel
- The Brain, 1962 theatrical film based on the same novel
