= The Brain That Wouldn't Die =

1962 film by Joseph Green

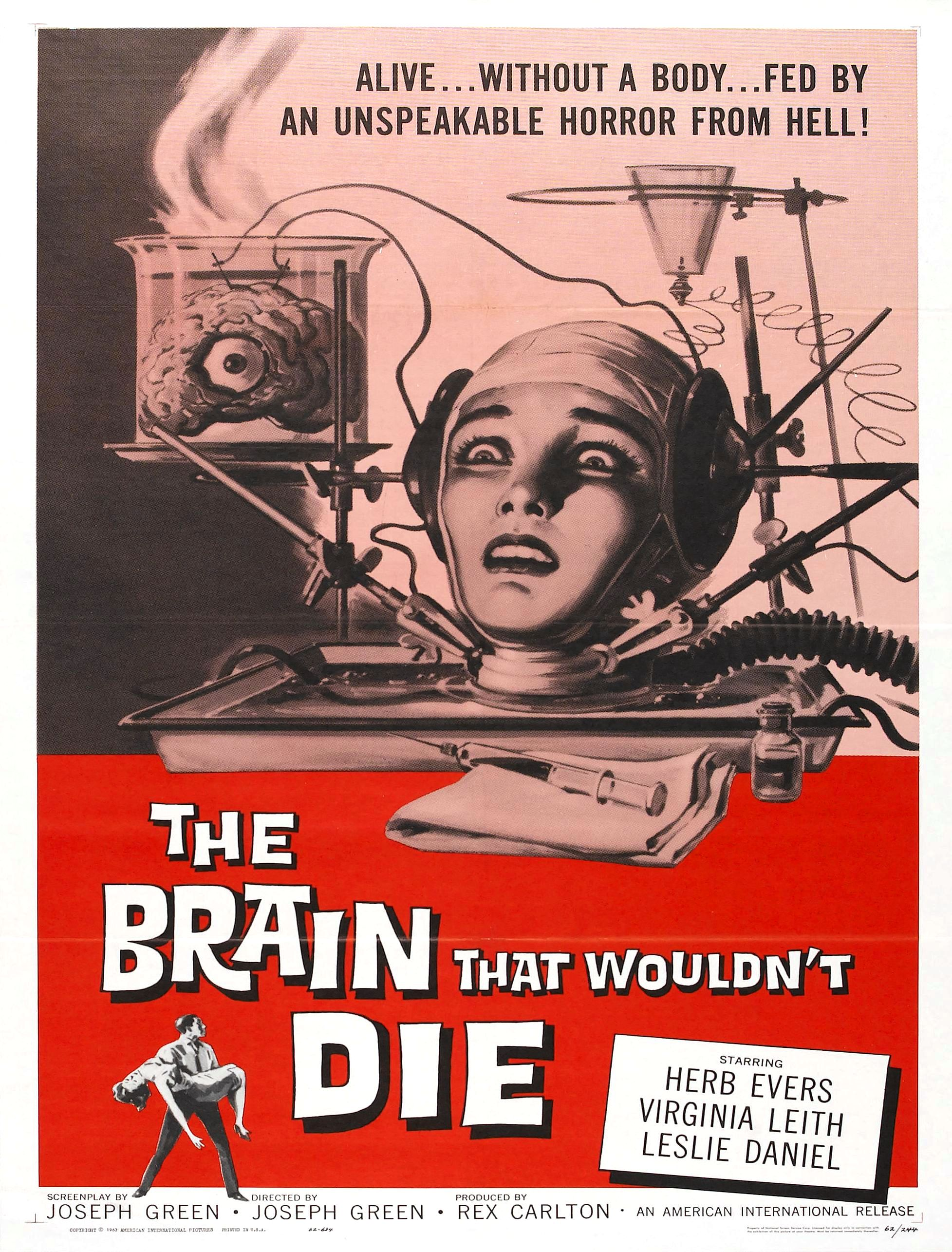
- Theatrical release poster by Reynold Brown
- Directed by: Joseph Green
- Written by: Rex Carlton; Joseph Green
- Produced by: Rex Carlton; Mort Landberg
- Starring: Jason Evers; Virginia Leith; Bruce Brighton; Adele Lamont; Eddie Carmel
- Cinematography: Stephen Hajnal
- Edited by: Leonard Anderson; Marc Anderson
- Music by: Abe Baker; Tony Restaino
- Production company: Rex Carlton Productions
- Distributed by: American International Pictures
- Release date: May 3, 1962
- Running time: 71 minutes (theatrical); 83 minutes (uncut)
- Country: United States
- Language: English
- Budget: $62,000 (estimated)

The Brain That Wouldn't Die (also known as The Head That Wouldn't Die) is a 1962 American science fiction horror film directed by Joseph Green and starring Jason Evers and Virginia Leith. It was written by Green and Rex Carlton. The film was completed in 1959 under the working title The Black Door but was not theatrically released until May 3, 1962, as a double feature with Invasion of the Star Creatures.

The film focuses upon a mad doctor who develops a means of keeping human body parts alive. He keeps his fiancée's severed head alive for days, along with a lumbering, malformed brute (one of his earlier failed experiments) imprisoned in a closet.

The specific plot device of a mad doctor who discovers a way to keep a human head alive had been used in fiction earlier (such as Professor Dowell's Head from 1925), as well as other variants on this theme. It shares several key plot devices with the West German horror film The Head (1959).

The film was in the public domain in the United States from the day of its release due to a flawed copyright notice.

== Plot ==
The entire film

Dr. Bill Cortner saves a patient who had been pronounced dead, but the senior surgeon, Bill's father, condemns his son's unorthodox methods and theories of transplanting.

While driving to his family's country house, Bill and his beautiful fiancée Jan Compton become involved in a car accident that decapitates her. Bill recovers her severed head and rushes to his country house basement laboratory. He and his disabled assistant Kurt revive the head in a liquid-filled tray. But Jan's new existence is agony, and she begs Bill to let her die. He ignores her pleas, and she grows to resent him.

Bill decides to commit murder to obtain a body for Jan. He hunts for a suitable specimen at a burlesque nightclub, on the streets, and at a beauty contest. Jan begins communicating telepathically with a hideous mutant, an experiment gone wrong, locked in a laboratory cell. When Kurt leaves a hatch in the cell door unlocked, the monster grabs and tears off Kurt's arm. Kurt dies from his injuries.

Bill lures an old girlfriend, figure model Doris Powell, to his house, promising to study her scarred face for plastic surgery. He drugs her and carries her to the laboratory. Jan protests Bill's plan to transplant her head onto Doris's body. He tapes Jan's mouth shut.

When Bill goes to quiet the monster, it grabs Bill through the hatch and breaks the door from its hinges. Their struggles set the laboratory ablaze. The monster, a seven-foot giant with a horribly deformed head, bites a chunk from Bill's right cheek. Bill dies, and the monster carries the unconscious Doris to safety. As the lab goes up in flames, Jan says "I told you to let me die". The screen goes black, followed by Jan's maniacal cackle, welcoming her long-awaited death.

== Cast ==
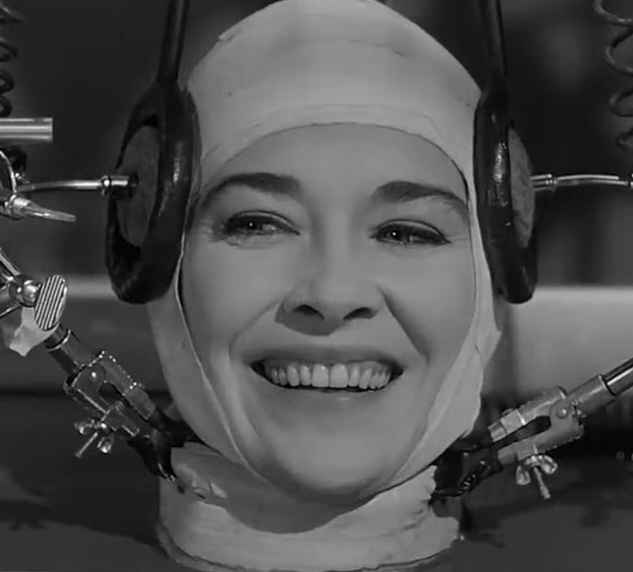
Virginia Leith as Jan Compton

- Jason Evers as Dr. Bill Cortner
- Virginia Leith as Jan Compton
- Bruce Brighton as Dr. Cortner senior (Bill's father)
- Anthony La Penna as Kurt (Cortner's assistant) (credited as Leslie Daniel)
- Adele Lamont as Doris Powell
- Bonnie Sharie as blonde stripper
- Paula Maurice as brunette stripper
- Marilyn Hanold as Peggy Howard
- Arny Freeman as photographer
- Fred Martin as medical assistant
- Lola Mason as Donna Williams
- Doris Brent as nurse
- Bruce Kerr as beaut contest M.C.
- Audrey Devereau as Jeannie Reynolds
- Eddie Carmel as monster
- Sammy Petrillo as Art (uncredited)

== Production ==
The film was shot independently around Tarrytown, New York, in 1959 under the working title The Black Door. Producer Rex Carlton suggested calling the film I Was a Teenage Brain Surgeon in the style of the similar titles of the time. The title was later changed to The Head That Wouldn't Die. Some prints of the film use both the opening title The Brain That Wouldn't Die and the closing title The Head That Wouldn't Die.

The monster in the closet was played, in his first cinematic role, by Eddie Carmel, a well-known Mandatory Palestine-born circus performer, who worked under the name "The Jewish Giant". He was the subject of a photograph by Diane Arbus, titled "The Jewish Giant at Home with His Parents in the Bronx, N.Y., 1970".

The main theme, titled "The Web", was composed by Abe Baker and Tony Restaino and was noted for creating a sinister mood.

== Release ==
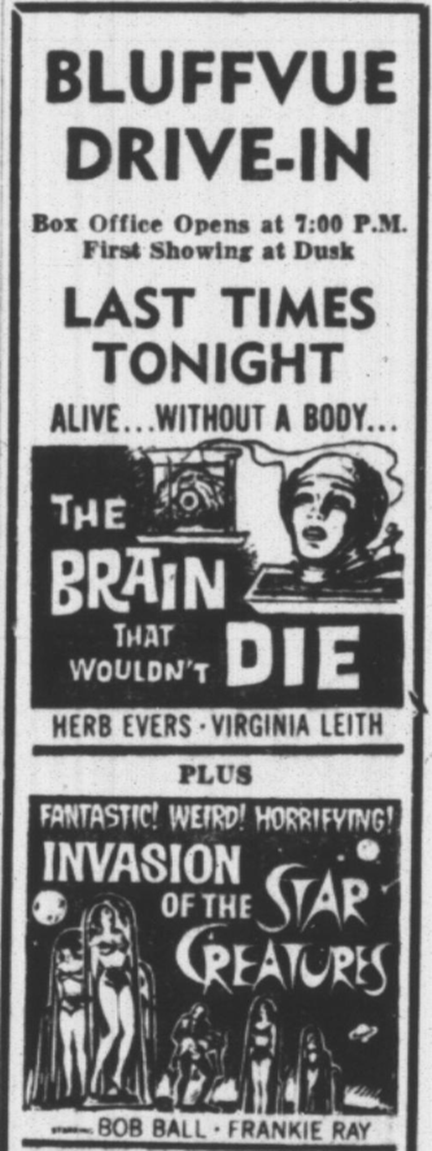
Advertisement from 1962 for The Brain That Wouldn't Die and co-feature, Invasion of the Star Creatures

The movie was picked up for release by AIP and released in 1962 on a double bill with Invasion of the Star Creatures. AIP cut it to 71 minutes for theatrical release.

=== Home media ===
An uncut, 35 mm print was used in the Special Edition release by Synapse Films in 2002. Running 85 minutes, this version features more of the stripper catfight, as well as some extra gore.

In December 2015, Shout! Factory released a Blu-ray edition of the uncut film, with a high-definition transfer taken from the negative.

=== Mystery Science Theater 3000 episode ===
The film was featured in episode 513 of Mystery Science Theater 3000, first airing on Comedy Central on October 30, 1993.

This film was the first movie watched by Mike Nelson (Michael J. Nelson) in Mystery Science Theater 3000, after he replaced Joel Robinson (Joel Hodgson) on the series. The theme song was altered for this change, and the "doorway sequence" into the theater was also updated.

In a poll of Bring Back MST3K Kickstarter backers, which raised money for an eleventh season of the show, The Brain that Wouldn't Die was ranked #23. Writer Jim Vorel ranked the episode considerably lower, at #131 (Note: Ranking based on 197 episodes as of 2018.) in his ranking of MST3K episodes from the first twelve seasons, saying, "It’s a dark, fairly ugly movie with extremely cheap sets, but Mike’s presence puts the crew into an upbeat, energetic state that contrasts nicely with it."

The MST3K episode was released on VHS by Rhino Home Video in 1996 and as a single-disc DVD in April 2000; the uncut version of the original movie was also included as a bonus feature. Shout! Factory released the episode on DVD as part of the box set Mystery Science Theater 3000: The 25th Anniversary Edition on December 10, 2013. The Brain That Wouldn't Die shared a disc with Mitchell (episode #512); the disc also included an interview with actress Marilyn (Hanold) Neilson. Other episodes included in the collection are Moon Zero Two (episode #111), The Day the Earth Froze (episode #422), The Leech Woman (episode #802), and Gorgo (episode #909).

== Reception and legacy ==
Boxoffice wrote: "Unrelievedly concerned with the by-now familiar characterization of the mad scientist bent on preserving his fantastic schemes for the ostensible good of future mankind, this Rex Carlton production is on a par with predecessor attractions, director Joseph Green's screenplay providing little unanticipated developments from fade-in to fade-out."

On Rotten Tomatoes, the film holds an approval rating of 38% based on 13 reviews, with a weighted average rating of 4.63/10.

Author and film critic Leonard Maltin awarded the film 1.5 out of four stars, calling it "poorly produced".

On his website Fantastic Movie Musings and Ramblings, Dave Sindelar gave the film a mostly negative review, noting that, although it managed to work up a certain amount of tension and featured some good gore effects, it was ruined by its lack of likable and intelligent characters and its "inability to decide just how it wants to be taken".

TV Guide awarded the film two out of four stars, calling it "one of the most genuinely bizarre 'brain' movies".

=== Adaptations ===
The movie also inspired the musical stage production The Brain That Wouldn't Die! In 3D!!! by Tom Sivak and Elizabeth Gelman, that premiered at the New York Musical Theatre Festival in October 2011.

In 2015, Pug Bujeaud's musical theatrical production The HEAD! That Wouldn't Die was mounted in Olympia, Washington by Theater Artists Olympia. Lyrics and music were written by the ensemble cast and the TAO collective.

Soon thereafter, Hollywood screenwriter Bruce Bernhard adapted the script as a staged musical comedy, creating a completely new score for it with songwriter Chris Cassone. The official world premiere for The Brain That Wouldn’t Die!…the Musical was at the Footlight Players Theatre in Charleston, South Carolina on October 13, 2016.

A satirical feature film adaptation of the same title was filmed on location in Portland, Oregon. The film premiered on June 21, 2020, as part of the Portland Horror Film Festival.

== In popular culture ==
- The film was featured on the nationally syndicated television show Cinema Insomnia, hosted by Mr. Lobo.

== See also ==
- Isolated brain
- The Lady and the Monster, a 1944 film about a living brain kept inside a jar.
- The Head (1959 film) a similarly-themed German horror film from 1959
- Eyes Without a Face, a 1960 horror film about organ transplantation.
- The Brain, another film released in 1962 featuring an isolated brain.
- Donovan's Brain, a 1953 black-and-white science fiction horror film featuring Nancy Davis (later Nancy Reagan).
- The Man with Two Brains, 1983 film
- Re-Animator (1985 film), another take on the subject, loosely based on a Lovecraft novelette, spawning two sequels and a cult status.
- Frankenhooker (1990 film), also about a mad scientist bringing his decapitated Fiancée back to life with stolen body parts.
- Professor Dowell's Head, a 1925 science fiction and horror story (and later novel) by Russian author Alexander Belyaev.
