= Robert Sidney =

Robert Sidney may refer to:

- Robert Sidney, 1st Earl of Leicester (1563–1626), English nobleman and statesman
- Robert Sidney, 2nd Earl of Leicester (1595–1677), son of the above
- Robert Sidney, 4th Earl of Leicester (1649–1702)
- Robert Sidney (choreographer) (1909–2008), American choreographer

== See also ==
- Dennis Danvers for Robert Sydney, science fiction author
