= Tom Adair =

American songwriter and screenwriter (1913–1988)

Background information
- Born: Thomas Montgomery Adair; June 15, 1913; Newton, Kansas, United States
- Died: May 24, 1988 (aged 74) Honolulu, Hawaii, United States
- Occupations: Songwriter, composer, and screenwriter

Thomas Montgomery Adair (June 15, 1913 – May 24, 1988) was an American songwriter, composer, and screenwriter.

== Biography ==
Adair was born on 15 June 1913, in Newton, Kansas, where his father owned a clothing store; he was the only child of William Adair and Madge Cochran.

Around 1923, the family moved to Los Angeles, where Tom Adair attended Los Angeles Junior College. In his early career he worked as a complaints clerk at the local power company, while writing poetry and song lyrics in his spare time.

In 1941, Adair met Matt Dennis in a club and the duo began writing songs together. Adair's songwriting career took him to New York during the 1940s where he penned several Broadway hits, and worked with Tommy Dorsey and Frank Sinatra. He later returned to Los Angeles and worked with writer James B. Allardice on scripts for sitcoms.

In 1949, Adair married Frances Adelle Jeffords; in later life, they worked together on songs and teleplays for Disney. They had four children.

== Career ==
After meeting Matt Dennis in 1940, Adair started working with him, moving to New York when the duo were hired by Tommy Dorsey. Adair and Dennis wrote numerous songs for Dorsey, Bing Crosby, and Dinah Shore, and penned Frank Sinatra's hit "Let's Get Away from It All." In 1942, Matt Dennis joined the Army Air Corps. Adair moved on to work with Dick Uhl and hit song "In the Blue of the Evening" with Alfonso d'Artega. About the collaboration among Adair, Dennis, and Sinatra, Vanity Fair magazine said "Sinatra's first recording away from Dorsey took place at RCA’s Los Angeles studios on the afternoon of Monday, January 19, 1942. He had chosen the song for his attempt as a soloist, a ballad, naturally, all dripping with romance: it was 'The Night We Called It a Day', by these new kids Matt Dennis and Tom Adair, who’d written 'Let’s Get Away from It All' and 'Violets for Your Furs.' "

From June 1944, Adair worked with composer Gordon Jenkins in writing a complete score every week for the Auto-Lite radio show, which featured singer Dick Haymes.

He wrote many hit songs, including "Let's Get Away From It All", "Everything Happens to Me", "In the Blue of the Evening", "Will You Still Be Mine?", "Violets for Your Furs", "The Night We Called It a Day", "The Skyscraper Blues", "A Home-Sweet-Home in the Army", "How Will I Know My Love?", "Sing a Smiling Song", "Paul Bunyan", "There's No You", and "Weep No More".

In 1949, Adair wrote the lyrics for the Broadway production of Along Fifth Avenue. It ran for 180 performances at the Broadhurst Theatre, with the original cast including Carol Bruce, Jackie Gleason, George S. Irving, Hank Ladd, Donald Richards and Nancy Walker.

After the show closed, Adair returned to Los Angeles, working for Disney in the 1950s. Penning songs and skits for both the 1950s and 1970s Mickey Mouse Club. As well as helped shaped the Disneyland amusement park brand with his contributions to The Country Bear Jamboree, Miss Teddi Beara, and The Golden Horseshoe Review.

In 1958, Adair first met James B. Allardice while working on The Ann Sothern Show (1958); he wrote the music while Allardice was a writer on the show. Adair went on to have a successful partnership working on the sitcom, Hazel (1961); however, they also collaborated in the writing on two episodes of Hazel: "A Replacement for Phoebe" (which aired on 1961-10-02) and "Harold's Good Fortune" (which aired on 1961-11-30). Later the two collaborated on many other shows, including My Three Sons, F Troop, Hogan's Heroes, I Dream of Jeannie, and Gomer Pyle – USMC. The partnership lasted until Allardice's death in 1966.

A late triumph was the lyrics for an NBC cartoon special, "Babar Comes to America" (1971) with John Scott Trotter.

=== Music in films ===
- The Ides of March. George Clooney, Ryan Gosling (2011)
- Melinda and Melinda. Jonny Lee Miller (2004)
- Keeping the Faith. Eli Wallach (2000)
- The End of the Affair. Ralph Fiennes (1999)
- Playing by Heart. Sean Connery (1998)
- Julie. Doris Day (1956)

=== Music in television ===
- We Were the Mulvaneys (2002)

== Death ==
The Adairs retired to Honolulu, Hawaii, in 1984. On 24 May 1988, Tom died at the age of 74.

== Award nominations ==
Year	Award	Result	Category	Film
1957	Academy Award	Nominated	Outstanding Individual Achievement in Music	Julie (Shared with Leith Stevens)
1969	Emmy Award	Nominated	Outstanding Individual Achievement in Music	The Story of Babar, the Little Elephant (Shared with John Scott Trotter)
2010	41st Annual Songwriters Hall of Fame	Awarded and inducted	Songwriting team of Tom Adair & Matt Dennis, contributions to the worldwide landscape of music through an extraordinary expression of lyrics and composition.	
