= Hauser's Memory =

1970 science fiction television movie by Boris Sagal

Hauser's Memory is a 1970 science fiction television movie directed by Boris Sagal that starred David McCallum, Susan Strasberg, Lilli Palmer, Robert Webber and Leslie Nielsen. The screenplay by Adrian Spies was based on a 1968 novel of the same name by Curt Siodmak, which reworked the central idea of his novel Donovan's Brain (1943).

== Plot ==
The dying scientist Hauser knows of missile secrets. To preserve this information, Hillel Mondoro (McCallum) injects himself with the cerebrospinal fluid extracted from Hauser. Hauser's memories take control of him, and he finds himself traveling to Europe to the locations where Hauser lived. Hauser's wife Anna (Palmer) turns out to be pro-Nazi, and the memory of this woman also becomes imprinted on Mondoro's mind. Mondoro begins to suffer from Hauser's alcoholism. By the end of the film he is driven mad by the memories and ends up dying.

== Reception ==
This film was a nominee for the 1971 Hugo Award for Best Dramatic Presentation.

== Cast ==
- David McCallum – Hillel Mondoro
- Susan Strasberg – Karen Mondoro
- Helmut Käutner – Dr. Kramer
- Lilli Palmer – Anna Hauser
- Leslie Nielsen – Joseph Slaughter
- Robert Webber – Dorsey
- Herbert Fleischmann – Werner Renner
- Peter Capell – Dr. Shepilov
- Barbara Lass – Angelika
- Peter Ehrlich – Kucera
- Günter Meisner – Korowiew
- Arthur Brauss – Bak
- Jochen Busse – Dieter's Impersonator

== Filming locations ==
- Palace Hotel, Copenhagen
