= Lola Montes (dancer) =

Spanish dancer

- Montes in a late 40s/early 50s publicity photo.
- Born: Gertrude Tashma; February 5, 1918; New York, New York, USA
- Died: May 16, 2008 (aged 90); Laguna Woods, California, USA
- Other name: Chita Equizabal
- Occupation: Dancer
- Years active: 1933–2000
- Spouse(s): Antonio Triana (194?–195?); Luis Equizabal (195?–1980)

Lola Montes (1918–2008) was the stage name used by Chita Equizabal (born Gertrude Tashma), a Spanish dancer who performed throughout the United States for nearly 70 years.

== Early life ==
Equizabal, the daughter of poor Russian immigrants, grew up in New York City with a passion for dance. She attended ballet school in the city and received training in Spanish dance. At age 15, she began dancing professionally when she was hired at a Greenwich Village nightclub. With her father's help, she had her name legally changed to Chita Tashma.

As her talent grew, she became the first American to work with Carmen Amaya, a renowned gypsy flamenco dancer. Touring with Amaya's company, she met her first husband (and dance partner), Antonio Triana. After arriving in California during the 1940s, the couple appeared in a number of Spanish-themed films (including The Gay Senorita, The Lady and the Monster and The Bridge of San Luis Rey). The couple divorced in the 1950s. She later went on to marry a Spanish nobleman, Luis Equizabal, who had left Spain during its civil war. They remained married until his death in Los Angeles in 1980.

== Career ==
In 1955, Lola Montes founded her own dance company, "Lola Montes and Her Spanish Dancers". The company toured throughout the United States and Canada for over two decades. In 1974, the Lola Montes Foundation for Dances of Spain and the Americas was established. The foundation was focused around the preservation of Spanish dance through community and educational outreach. Throughout this entire period from 1955 until her last performance in 2000, Lola acted as tour manager, choreographer, teacher and wardrobe supervisor for her dancers.

During her career, Ms. Montes received numerous civic awards. She was an active member of her community, as a long-time member of the National Endowment for the Arts and the California Arts Council, serving as a member of the 1984 Los Angeles Olympics organizing committee and acting as president of the Los Angeles Area Dance Alliance in 1985. Her legacy is carried on by her many students, most notably Oscar Nieto an award-winning flamenco dancer in Canada, who is producing a documentary on the life and career of Equizabal.

Carolina Lugo made her professional debut with Lola's company at age 14 and toured with her for eight seasons. While with her company she performed with the Los Angeles Opera at the Los Angeles Greek Amphitheater and with the Los Angeles Philharmonic Symphony at the Dorothy Chandler Pavilion. Carolina formed her own dance company, Carolina Lugo's y Carolé Acuna's Ballet Flamenco in San Francisco in 1995. Carolé is Carolina's daughter. Lola donated many of her costumes that she had made for her company in Spain to Carolina. These costumes are still used in many of Carolina's productions of Spanish dance with symphonies and opera companies nationally and internationally as an homage to Ms. Montes and to continue preserving the totality of the dances, songs and music from Spain that Lola started in 1955.
