= Kathryn Meisle =

American opera singer

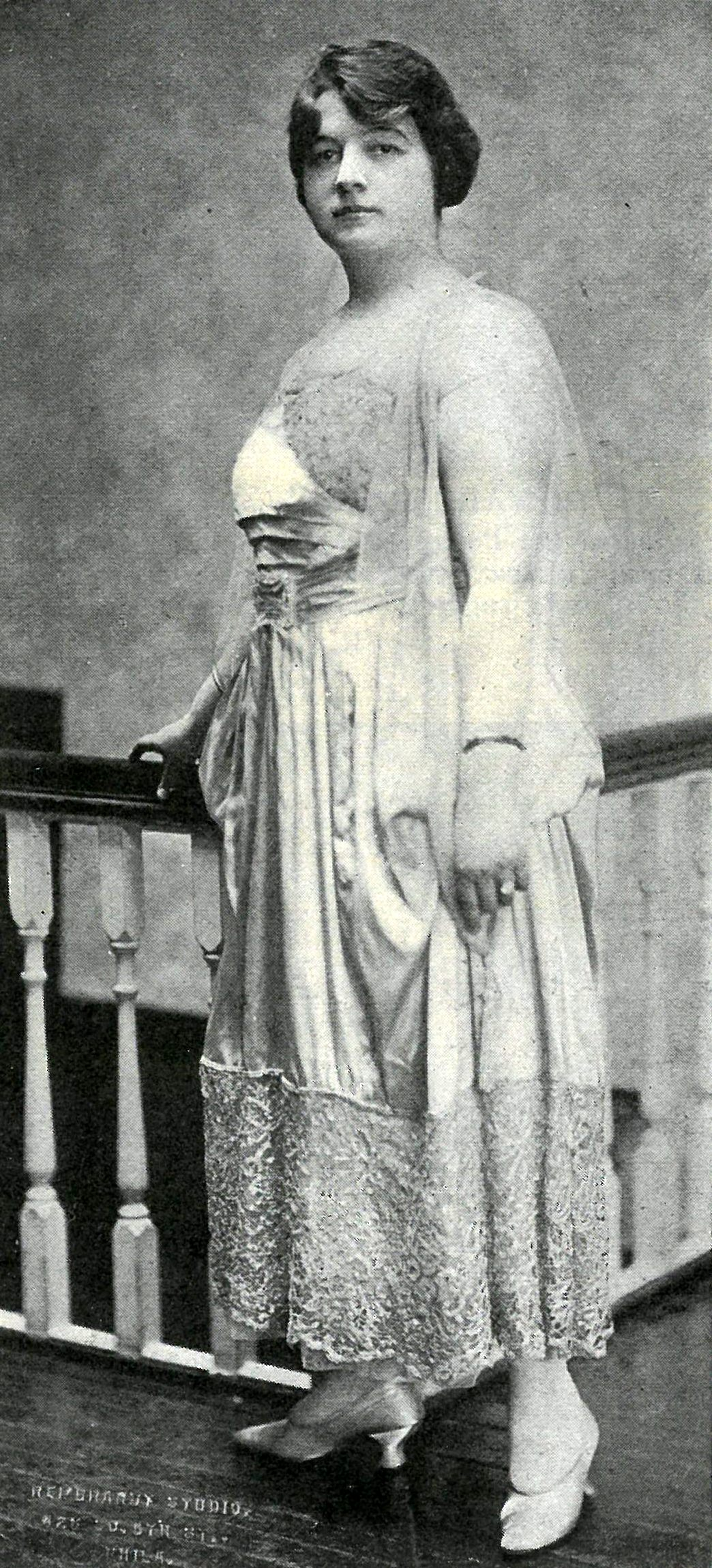
- Meisle in 1919

Background information
- Also known as: Kathryn Franklin
- Born: October 14, 1899; Philadelphia, Pennsylvania, US
- Died: January 17, 1970 (aged 70) New York City, US
- Occupation: contralto
- Years active: 1923-1946

Kathryn Meisle (October 14, 1899—January 17, 1970) was an American operatic contralto.

Kathryn Meisle was born in Philadelphia. Her grandfather, Matthew Müssle, originally from Baden-Baden, Germany, settled in Philadelphia in 1848. After naturalization in 1856 he changed his surname to Meisle.

As a child, her father urged her to take piano lessons, sometimes taking multiple lessons a week. When she was fifteen, she was heard by a choir director who offered her a position. Thereafter she commenced vocal study. One of her vocal teachers was Enrica Clay Dillon.

In 1917 she married Calvin M. Franklin (born 1887), an agent who became her manager.

She made her professional debut as a soloist with the Minneapolis Symphony Orchestra conducted by Emil Oberhoffer in 1918. She made her operatic debut as Erda in the opera Siegfried by Richard Wagner on November 18, 1923, at the Chicago Civic Opera.

Among the radio shows on which Meisle appeared was the Atwater Kent Radio Hour, which was heard Sunday nights. Meisle earliest appearances on the show appear to date from 1927. Meisle sang at the inauguration of Franklin Delano Roosevelt in 1937.

Meisle made her San Francisco Opera debut as Amneris in Aida on October 1, 1926. She sang with the company in the years 1926-1927, 1929, 1932-1933, 1935-36, performing the roles of Azucena in Il trovatore, Brangäne in Tristan und Isolde, The Witch in Hansel und Gretel, Ortrud in Lohengrin, Erda in Das Rheingold and Siegfried, Fricka in Die Walküre and Waltraute in Götterdämmerung. In 1927 she sang with the Los Angeles Grand Opera, appearing as Amneris as well as Giovanna in Rigoletto and Suzuki in Madama Butterfly.

Amneris was again her debut role on June 25, 1929, for the Cologne Opera.

She made her Metropolitan Opera debut as Amneris in Aida on February 28, 1935. Her Met career was brief, with a total of eleven performances from 1935 to 1938 in the roles of Azucena, Fricka, Erda and Waltraute.

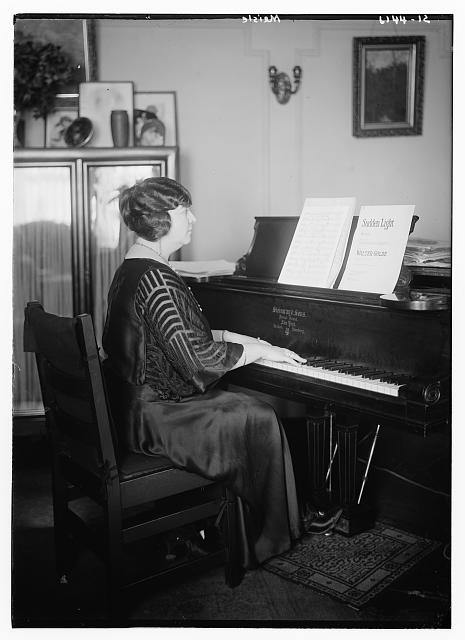
Kathryn Meisle

From her earliest years as a professional singer through 1940, Meisle gave numerous recitals across the country.

In 1940, her husband Calvin Monroe Franklin was involved in a car accident. He never recovered and died on July 23, 1941, in Philadelphia. At the time of his death he was secretary of Columbia Concerts Corporation and vice-president of the Arthur Judson concerts service.

Meisle appeared in the 1946 Decca recording of Jerome Kern's Roberta.

Her New York Times obituary stated that she had taught voice "in recent years." Meisle died in New York City on January 17, 1970.
