= The Brain That Wouldn't Die (2020 film) =

- Directed by: Derek Carl
- Screenplay by: Hank Huffman
- Based on: The Brain That Wouldn't Die by: Joseph Green; Rex Carlton
- Produced by: Derek Carl; Hank Huffman; Molly Preston
- Starring: Rachael Perrell Fosket; Patrick D. Green; David Withers; Jason Reynolds; Robert Blanche; Mia Allen; Julia Bray; Gaelle Lola Beauvais; Alex Tiefenthaler; Kristen Mortensen; Kelsey Norene; Bethany Jacobs; Devon Rawlings
- Cinematography: Kevin Forrest
- Edited by: Derek Carl
- Production companies: Flagship Features; Hyperbole Productions
- Release date: June 21, 2020 (Portland Horror Film Festival)
- Country: United States
- Language: English

The Brain That Wouldn't Die is a 2020 satirical remake of the 1962 American science fiction horror film of the same name. It was directed by Derek Carl and premiered at the Portland Horror Film Festival. Per Starburst magazine, the film is nearly a shot-by-shot remake of the original.

== Synopsis ==
Dr. Bill Cortner is a brilliant doctor that has gone mad after decapitating his fiancée Jan in a car accident. He steals her head and succeeds in reanimating it, much to Jan's horror. Cortner is not content with merely bringing her head back to life—he wants to give her an all new body, but must resort to unsavory and deadly measures to obtain one.

== Cast ==
- Rachael Perrell Fosket as Jan Compton
- Patrick D. Green as Dr. Bill Cortner
- David Withers as William Cortner
- Jason Reynolds as Kurt
- Robert Blanche as Detective Mancini
- Mia Allen as Doris Powell
- Julia Bray as Roxanne
- Gaelle Lola Beauvais as Lady Marmalade
- Alex Tiefenthaler as The Thing
- Kristen Mortensen as Donna Williams
- Kelsey Norene as Jeanie Reynolds
- Bethany Jacobs as Bonnie
- Devon Rawlings as Paula

== Production ==
Funding for The Brain That Wouldn't Die was partially obtained through a successful Kickstarter campaign. Filming took place in Portland, Oregon during 2016 and actors Rachael Perrell Fosket, Patrick Green, Jason Reynolds, Mia Allen, and Robert Blanche were brought on to portray the film's central characters. Inspiration for The Brain That Wouldn't Die was taken from the original movie, as well as from films such as Re-Animator and The Man With Two Brains.

== Release ==
The Brain That Wouldn't Die premiered at the Hollywood Theatre as part of the Portland Horror Film Festival on June 21, 2020.

== Reception ==
Critical reception has been mixed to positive and the film holds a rating of 67% on Rotten Tomatoes, based on 6 reviews. Rue Morgue and Dread Central both wrote favorable reviews for the movie and Dread Central wrote that "It’s far from perfect in a technical sense, but we’re talking about art, not bricks. Technicalities be damned, I had fun watching this movie." Starburst was more critical, questioning "what’s the thinking behind doing an almost shot-for-shot version of a 1962 cult favorite rather than attempt to better it?"
