= Deertrees Theatre =

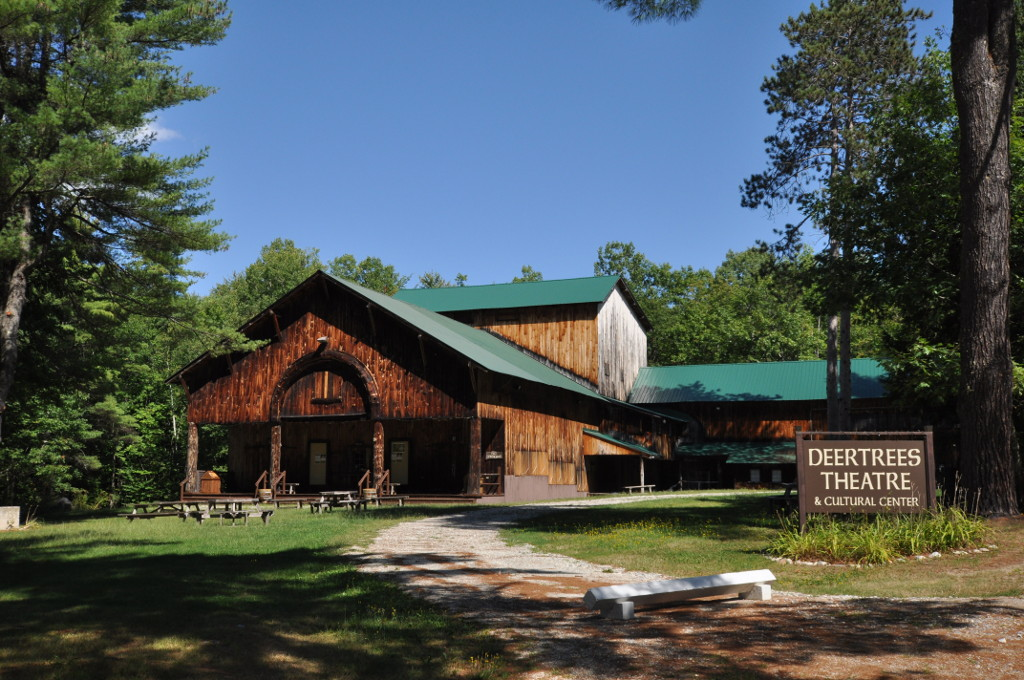
- Interactive map of Deertrees Theatre
- Address: Deertrees Road; Harrison, Maine; United States
- Coordinates: 44°7′3″N 70°39′54″W
- Owner: Deertrees Foundation
- Capacity: 299
- Type: Summer Theatre
- Designation: National Register of Historic Places

Construction
- Built: 1935
- Opened: August 15, 1936
- Architect: Harrison G. Wiseman
- Builder: George Locke

Website
- www.deertrees-theatre.org
- Deertrees Theatre
- U.S. National Register of Historic Places
- Architectural style: Late 19th And Early 20th Century American Movements, Rustic
- NRHP reference No.: 88003002
- Added to NRHP: January 5, 1989

Deertrees Theatre is a performing arts center located in Harrison, Maine, United States. The theatre was founded by the distinguished opera director and singing coach Enrica Clay Dillon in 1936 and is now owned and operated by the non-profit Deertrees Foundation. As home to the Deertrees Theatre Festival, the Sebago-Long Lake Music Festival, the BackStage Gallery, and the Salt Lick Cafe, Deertrees is one of the most active summer theatres in the Northeast. Listed on the National Register of Historic Places and the Maine Register of Historic Places, it is sanctioned by the Actors' Equity Association as "a small professional house."

== The Theatre ==
Designed in the Adirondack style by Harrison G. Wiseman and built by George Locke of Bridgton, the theatre was constructed of rose hemlock harvested on the property. The proscenium arch was made from whole tree trunks and the beams, doors, trim, and light fixtures were all hand-carved. The building was designed so the entire auditorium with its pitched floor could be detached from the stage end and moved forward allowing an extra section with more seating inserted. It boasted a thirty-member orchestra pit, stage dimensions identical to the Metropolitan Opera House, and the best technical equipment of any theatre outside of New York. Two large barn doors located behind the stage could be opened for an authentic forest backdrop. Whether by chance or design, the theatre also had near-perfect acoustics. More than sixty years after the theatre first opened, Christopher Hyde, classical music critic for the Maine Sunday Telegram, theorized that the tight sheathing of rough hemlock and pre-stressed posts and beams created the effect of a large stringed instrument able to transmit vibrations efficiently without echoes or reverberation.

== History ==
The theatre's gala opening on August 15, 1936, featured a reading from Cyrano de Bergerac by the classical actor, Walter Hampden. Only two more productions were presented that summer but the following season Deertrees became a fixture on the straw hat circuit by presenting four different plays and a musical comedy with a cast of professional actors in repertory under the direction of Ms. Dillon. However, in 1938 the theatre failed to open and when Deertrees reopened in the summer of 1939 it was under the auspices of the noted Broadway producer Bela Blau

Advertising "A New Play - A New Broadway A Star Every Week." Blau imported an entire Broadway cast from New York City every week including such stars as Ethel Barrymore, Tallulah Bankhead, Edward Everett Horton, Dame May Whitty, and Rudy Vallée. A young David Merrick was a jack-of-all-trades apprentice and credited on several playbills as being the associate producer and the then unpublished Helene Hanff worked in the box office. Local talent augmented smaller roles as the need arose. In addition to the theatre, Blau operated a school for theatrical designers headed by Raoul Pene Du Bois.

Following the death of Bela Blau in the autumn of 1940, Ms. Dillon returned to her first love, opera. She inaugurated The Deertrees Opera Company with the young Edwin McArthur (later replaced by Karl Kritz) as musical director and George Wells as scenic and lighting designer. The company consisted of some 12 to 15 young singers including Astrid Varnay, Phila Tharpe, and Elizabeth Caron and was a forerunner to the great opera-training programs to come to America some fifty years later. The Deertrees Opera Company continued into the summer of 1942 but with the United States in the war, after a Red Cross/U.S.O Benefit concert on August 31, the theatre went dark. In 1946, Ms. Dillon announced the re-opening of Deertrees Theatre for a "Summer Festival of Opera and Drama;" however, by mid-summer, Ms. Dillon's health had deteriorated to the extent that she was unable to continue working and, on October 9, 1946, her brilliant career ended and the theatre closed.

In 1949, New York attorney A. L. Sainer assumed responsibility for Deertrees and reopened the theatre under the management of his brother-in-law, actor/director Robert Harris. Mr. Harris ran Deertrees as an Equity repertory company, assembling casts from Broadway and Hollywood that included Peggy Allenby, Helene Reynolds, Margot Stevenson, Ferdi Hoffman, and William Tregoe. The internationally recognized designer Richardson Harrison Senie was appointed Scenic Artist and Cy Roossin, the Production Manager. The company presented mostly light comedies and farces such as For Love or Money and Petticoat Fever but the schedule also included dramatic productions of The Heiress, The Glass Menagerie, and Payment Deferred. In 1951, Harris returned to Hollywood and, once again, the theatre went dark.

In August 1953, The Boothbay Playhouse Corporation, headed by Sherwood Keith, purchased the theater. As a step toward stimulating local theatres and decentralizing the American Theater from New York, Keith introduced a policy of utilizing community theatre groups. For two years, Mr. Keith presented outstanding repertory companies from throughout New England but the second season, after a gala opening night starring Mr. Keith and his wife in The Four-Poster, did not meet with great success and in 1956 he sold the theatre to Mrs. Aya Sholley.

Mrs. Sholley appointed Emily Perry Bishop as resident director and brought in a small resident stock company to present a diverse program of dramas and matinees for children. However, by 1959, falling attendance and increased expenses had taken their toll, and in 1960 and 1961, the theatre failed to open.

In 1962, Deertrees Theatre once again took a premiere place on the Summer Theater circuit. Under new management, the theatre pursued a policy of resident players, as well as guest stars, most of whom were drawn from television. Ann B. "Schultzy" Davis opened the season in Everybody Loves Opal while Shirley Knight, rock idol Fabian, Allen Case, and John Saxon were some of the other performers making appearances. However, the enthusiasm did not last, the theatre closed at the end of that year, and it did not re-open for two years.

In 1965, Mrs. Sholley presented her alma mater, Boston's Emerson College, with the deed to Deertrees. Under the direction of Dr. Michael E. Rutenberg the theatre was operated as part of the Emerson College Center for the Performing Arts, a division of the college set up for the purpose of allowing students the opportunity to operate a summer theatre as well as take the usual academic courses. Among the students associated with Deertrees during these years were Paul Kreppel, Andrea Martin, and Ron McClartney. Emerson continued the project through 1969 when it sold the property to a former student, David Maturi.

Maturi and his Coventry Theatrical Community continued to use Emerson students for cast and technical crew and produced programs of comedies and musical comedies, including The Odd Couple, Mame, Cabaret, and Sweet Charity; at least the last three of which featured Cecilia Hart, then billed as Ceci Hart, in the roles of Agnes Gooch, Sally Bowles, and Charity Hope Valentine, respectively. However, once again failing attendance and increased expenses caused the theatre to close in 1971.

After three years of being closed, a former student of Enrica Clay Dillon, Judith Ritter purchased the theatre. The 1975 season opened with a resident opera company performing Mozart's Così fan tutte - not coincidentally, the last opera Enrica Clay Dillon produced before her death - and for the next three years, the theatre rotated between theatrical and operatic programs with "Twilight Pop Concerts" held on Sundays. In 1977, the Maine Opera Association made Deertrees its official home.

In 1979, Frank Best leased the theatre from the Ritters and formed the Deertrees Performing Arts Festival as a non-profit corporation. However, his plans for three productions by the Maine Opera Guild, a professional theatre company, and a series of concerts ranging from bluegrass to ragtime failed to materialize and the theatre closed.

By the mid-1980s, the theatre had been abandoned and considered a relic from a bygone era. The town of Harrison foreclosed on the property and there was a consideration of burning the building as an exercise for the local fire department. Fortunately, a group of concerned citizens led by Dr. Al Mills and Sally MacAuslan undertook the rescue of the theatre and formed the Deertrees Foundation to restore the building and grounds. In 1990, the theatre once again opened.

== Mission and current operations ==
The mission of Deertrees Theatre is to offer a diverse range of cultural events and professional entertainment at affordable prices while maintaining the theatre's historical tradition.

Deertrees Theatre is currently open each year from late June until early September and presents a mix of legitimate theatre, opera, music of all genres, comedy, and children's programs.

== See also ==
- National Register of Historic Places listings in Cumberland County, Maine
