= Eddie Carmel =

American entertainer (1936–1972)

- עודד הכרמלי
- Carmel with his parents in the Bronx, 1970. Photograph by Diane Arbus.
- Born: Oded Ha-Carmeili; March 16, 1936; Jaffa, Mandatory Palestine
- Died: July 30, 1972 (aged 36); Montefiore Medical Center, The Bronx, New York City, U.S.
- Other names: The Jewish Giant; The Happy Giant; The World's Biggest Cowboy
- Occupations: Sideshow performer; Actor; Comedian; Singer
- Years active: 1958–1969
- Known for: Performing as "The Jewish Giant"

Eddie Carmel (born Oded Ha-Carmeili, Hebrew: עודד הכרמלי; March 16, 1936 – August 14, 1972) was an American entertainer, born in Mandatory Palestine with gigantism and subsequent acromegaly resulting from a pituitary adenoma. He was popularly known as "The Jewish Giant", "The Happy Giant," and "The World's Biggest Cowboy."

Carmel was listed by the Guinness Book of World Records as 9 ft 0 in (2.74 m) tall, and billed at the heights of 8 ft 9 in (2.67 m) and 9 ft 0.625 in (2.76 m) tall, though he may have more realistically been around 7 ft 3 in (2.21 m) tall. He was variously a mutual funds salesman, carnival sideshow act, film actor, rock and roll band singer, and stand-up comedian. He was made famous by photographer Diane Arbus' picture Jewish Giant, taken at home with his parents in the Bronx, N.Y. in 1970, a print of which sold at auction for $421,000 in 2007 ($654,000 in current dollar terms). At the time of his death at age 36, he had shrunk several inches, due to kyphoscoliosis.

== Early life ==
Eddie Carmel was born Oded Ha-Carmeili on March 16, 1936, in Jaffa, Mandatory Palestine, to Orthodox Jewish immigrants Isaac (Itzhak) Ha-Carmeili, an insurance salesman born in Poland, and Miriam (née Pines), who was born in the United States and later worked as a secretary at the Jewish Theological Seminary of America. An only child, Carmel moved with his parents to the Bronx, New York, at age two after his mother returned to the United States to care for an ailing relative. The family later settled on Elgar Place in Co-op City, the Bronx. Carmel's parents were both 5 feet 6 inches (168 cm) tall, although his maternal grandfather in Poland was reputedly the tallest rabbi in the world at 7 feet 5 inches (226 cm).

In 1954, at age 18, Carmel graduated from Taft High School. He then attended City College of New York for two years, where he majored in business, joined the Dramatic Club, and was elected vice president of his class before later attending Baruch College. "Eddie" had been his nickname since childhood, and Carmel later adopted it as his stage name.

== Medical condition ==
Carmel had gigantism and later developed acromegaly, both caused by a pituitary adenoma. He weighed 16 pounds (7.3 kg) at birth. By age 10, he stood 6 feet 1 inch (185 cm) tall. At age 15, he had grown to 6 feet 6 inches (198 cm) and was diagnosed with gigantism and acromegaly. He continued to grow through his teenage years and stood 7 feet (213 cm) tall when he graduated from Taft High School in 1954 at age 18.

Although Carmel was listed by the Guinness Book of World Records as 9 ft 0 in (2.74 m) tall and was billed at heights ranging from 8 ft 9 in (2.67 m) to 9 ft 0.625 in (2.76 m), later sources have suggested that his actual height was closer to 7 ft 3 in (2.21 m). He wore a size 24 shoe.

By 1969, at age 33, arthritis had made walking difficult, and Carmel required two canes. He later used a wheelchair and eventually became bedridden. Before his death at age 36, he developed kyphoscoliosis, a combination of kyphosis and scoliosis, and had lost several inches of height.

== Career ==
In 1958, Carmel sold mutual funds at an office near Times Square in Manhattan, New York City.

Due to his condition, Carmel's primary work was in carnival sideshows, including appearances at Hubert's Dime Museum and Flea Circus on West 42nd Street in Times Square, Milt Levine's World of Mirth show, and in the 1960s in the Ringling Bros. and Barnum & Bailey Circus (which billed him as being 9 feet and 5/8 of an inch tall, and 500 pounds). He also acted in a few films, such as the science fiction horror film The Brain That Wouldn't Die (1962) and 50,000 B.C. (Before Clothing) (1963).

He formed and played with a rock and roll band, Frankenstein and the Brain Surgeons. Carmel also recorded two novelty 45 records, "The Happy Giant" and "The Good Monster," and the single "The Happy Monster's Song".

For a time Carmel, with his best friend, Irwin Sherman, worked together as stand-up comedians in New York. He stopped working in 1969, as his physical condition and arthritis made movement difficult, and he required two canes when he walked, later a wheelchair, and ultimately he was unable to get out of bed.

== Media ==
At age 34, in 1970, Carmel was photographed by Diane Arbus for Jewish Giant, Taken at Home with His Parents in the Bronx, N.Y. The photograph, taken in his parents' apartment two years before his death, became one of Arbus's best-known works. As Arbus prepared to take the photograph, Carmel joked, "Isn't it awful to have midget parents?"

Arbus remarked on her photo, "You know how every mother has nightmares when she’s pregnant that her baby will be born a monster? … I think I got that in the mother’s face…"

Twenty-seven years after Carmel's death, in 1999, his cousin produced an audio documentary about his life for Sound Portraits Productions, the predecessor to StoryCorps. The documentary was inspired by Arbus's photograph.

Interest in Carmel's image continued after his death. A print of Arbus's photograph sold at auction for $421,000 in 2007 (equivalent to $654000 in 2025). Ten years later, another print sold for $583,500 at Christie's in 2017 (equivalent to $766000 in 2025).

== Death ==
Carmel died of glandular disease, on August 14, 1972, age of 36, in Montefiore Hospital in the Bronx, New York. At the time of his funeral, he had shrunk several inches, due to kyphoscoliosis (curvature of the spine, a mixture of scoliosis and kyphosis).

== See also ==
- List of tallest people
