= Enrica Clay Dillon =

American opera singer, director, and voice teacher (1885–1946)

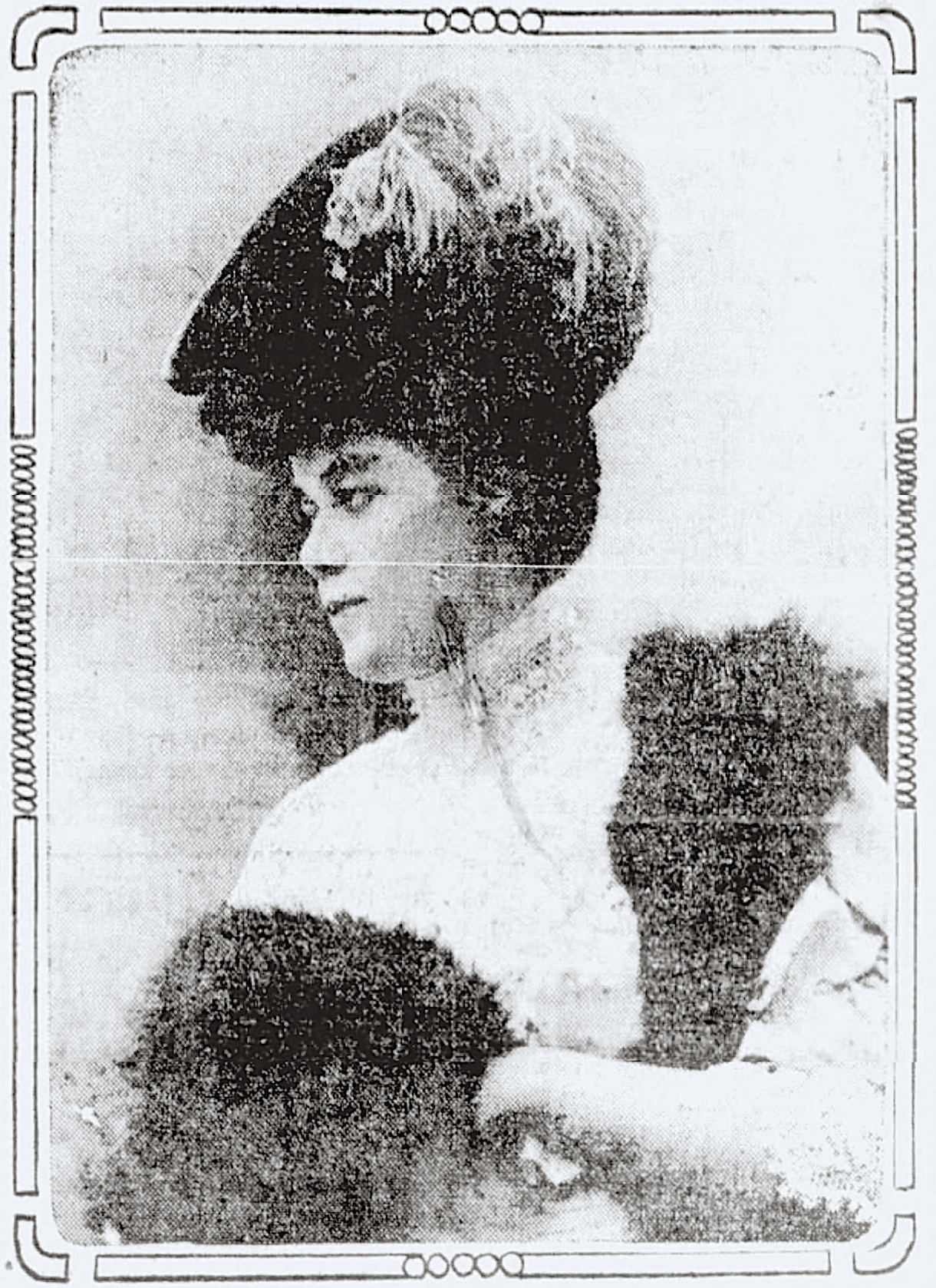
- Born: Florence Ada Dillon; June 22, 1878; Denver, Colorado, U.S.
- Died: October 9, 1946 (aged 61); Harrison, Maine, Dillon
- Other names: Enrica Dilli; Adele Dilli

Enrica Clay Dillon (born Florence Ada Dillon, June 22, 1878 – October 9, 1946) was an American opera singer, opera director, and voice teacher. She was known on the stage in Europe as first Adele Dilli and later Enrica Dilli. In the United States she eventually became known as Enrica Clay Dillon; taking the name as homage to her father, the California judge Henry Clay Dillon (Enrica is the feminine version of Henry in Italian).

== Early life and family ==
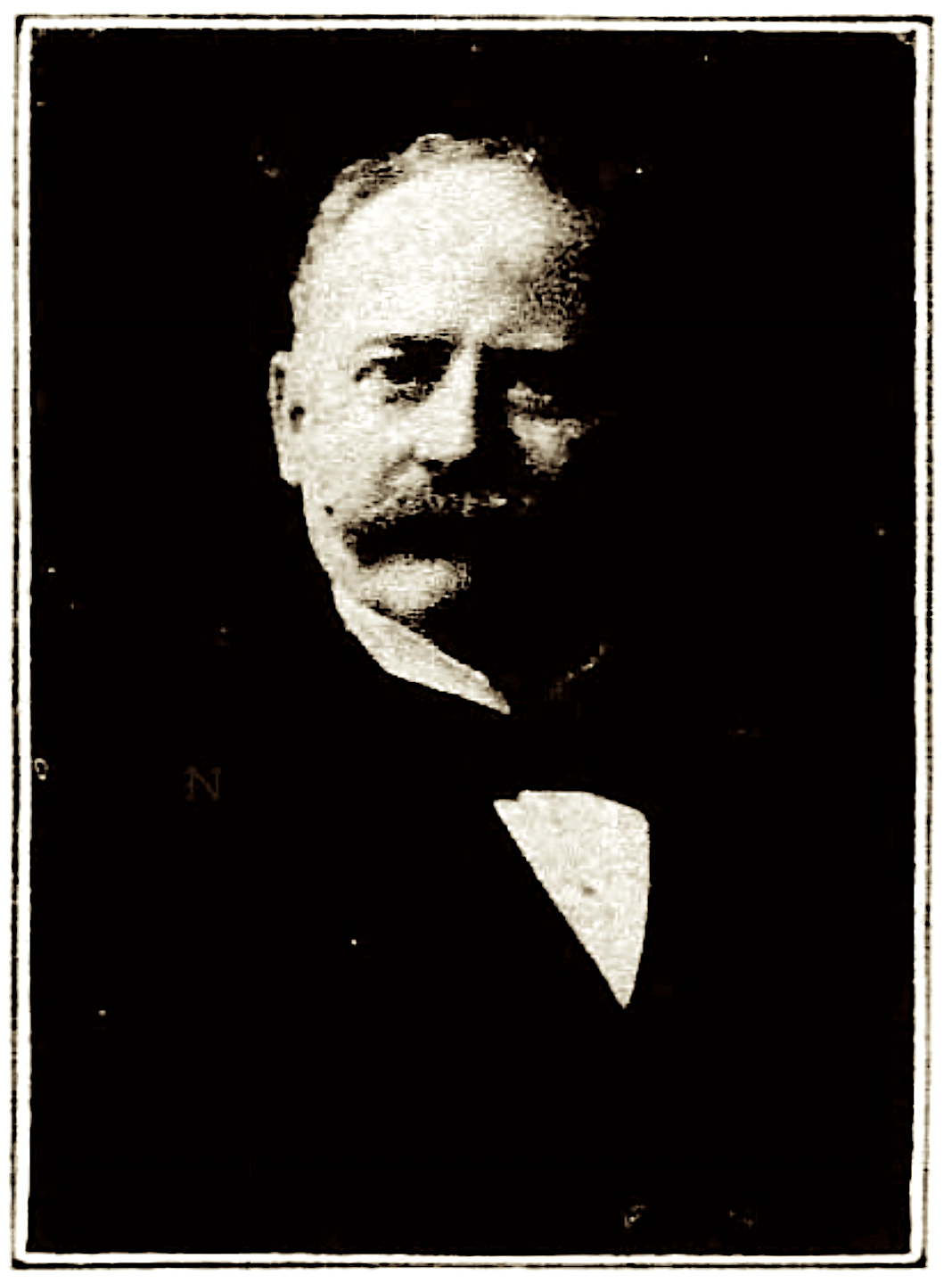
Henry Clay Dillon (1846–1912) in 1909. The father of Enrica Clay Dillon.

Florence Ada Dillon was born in Denver, Colorado on June 22, 1878. (Note: Social Security records under the name Enrica Clay Dillon give her birth date and place as June 22, 1885 in Denver, Colorado. However, this was not her birth name which was Florence Ada Dillon. Her passport application under her birth name of Florence gives her date and place of birth as June 22, 1878 in Denver. This date matches the 1880 United States census where her age is given as two years old, and both of her parents names are listed with hers in the same household in Leadville, Colorado.) She was the daughter of Henry Clay Dillon and Florence (née Hood) Dillon. She had five siblings, and was the older sister of composer Fannie Charles Dillon. Her other sister was the actress Josephine Dillon who was the first wife of Clark Gable.

Dillon's father, Henry, was a native of Lancaster, Wisconsin. He was a graduate of Racine College and a lawyer in Colorado. He left his position as a name partner in the Denver law firm of Markham & Dillon in 1889 when he moved the Dillon family to Long Beach, California and opened a law practice in Los Angeles. He succeeded James McLachlan as Los Angeles County District Attorney in 1892. In 1904 he was the Democratic Party candidate for California's 35th senatorial district. He also worked as a municipal judge in Los Angeles, and taught at USC School of Law until his death in 1912.

== Education ==
After moving to California, Dillon attended public schools in the Long Beach Unified School District. She received her high school education in the college preparatory division of Pomona College (PC). While a student at PC she studied singing with Mrs. E. W. Hardon. When she graduated from PC in 1896, she sang at the commencement ceremony.

Dillon left California for Massachusetts to train as a singer; studying voice at Mount Holyoke College (MHC). She studied in Massachusetts for two years in the late 1890s, but did not complete her music degree. Her voice teacher was Charles R. Adams. In February 1898 she performed a minor part in Bibi—A Comedy of Toys at Association Hall in Boston as a fundraiser for the Boston Teachers' Mutual Benefit Association. In June 1899 she sang as a soloist in the concert of MHC's glee club, and that same month she performed Arthur Foote's "A Song of Four Seasons" and Edward MacDowell's "Ye banks and braes o' Bonnie Doon" at MHC's commencement ceremony which was attended by American president William McKinley.

By June Dillon was back in California and was involved with the music at Long Beach Congregational Church. In October 1900 she traveled with fellow aspiring California singers Marcella Craft, Mona Rockhold, and Floy Bradshow on a steamship operated by Norddeutscher Lloyd from New York to Genoa, Italy. These women were all previously students of Charles R. Adams in Boston who had recently died, and planned on living together in Milan while furthering their training in opera. In Milan she studied voice for several years with Vincenzo Sabbatini and dramatic acting/ stage movement with baritone Francesco Mottino while simultaneously teaching her own voice students.

== Performance career ==
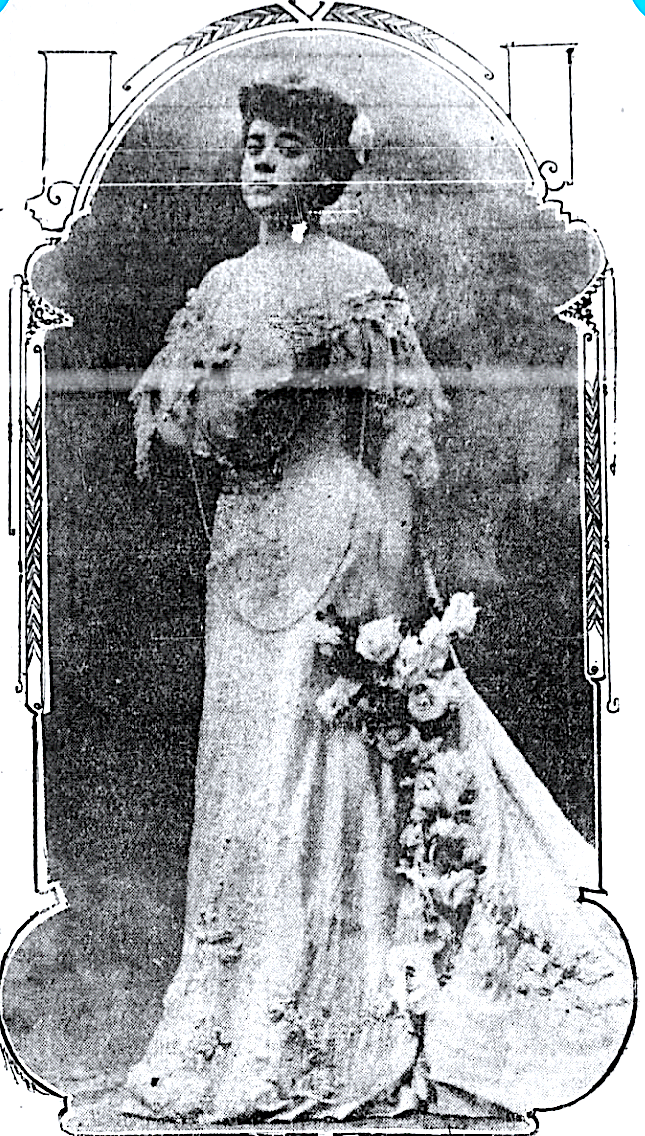
Enrica Clay Dillon as Violetta in La traviata at the Royal Opera House, Valletta in January 1909.

Dillon made her professional opera debut as Amina in Vincenzo Bellini's La sonnambula at the Teatro Pergolesi in Jesi, Italy on January 28, 1904. She was initially billed in Italy under the stage name Adele Dilli which she used she appeared as Violetta in La traviata in Milan in 1905. She later adopted the stage name Enrica Dilli while in Italy. She chose Enrica, the feminine version of the Italian name for Henry, after her father, and Dilli as a latinized version of her last name.

Dillon had a prolific career as a dramatic soprano in Europe in the decade before WWI, giving more than 1,800 opera performances. She was especially active in Italy and sang at most of the principle houses in that country, including La Scala. She was particularly known for her portrayal of the title role in Giuseppe Verdi's Aida. Some of the other roles in her repertoire included Amelia in Un ballo in maschera, Maddalena di Coigny in Andrea Chénier, and the title roles in Fedora and Tosca. In 1909 she gave her first performance at the Royal Opera House, Valletta as Violetta in La traviata. Some of the other opera houses she performed at included the Paris Opera, Opéra de Nice, the Teatro Real in Madrid, the Teatro Carlo Felice, and the Théâtre municipal de Tunis.

In January 1913 Dillon made her debut at the Chicago Grand Opera Company (CGOC) as Aida as a last minute replacement for Carolina White. She was billed as Enrica Clay. Later that year she appeared with CGOC as Santuzza in Cavalleria rusticana and Leonora in Il trovatore. In the second half of 1913 she toured the United States in the De Koven Opera Company as Maid Marian in Reginald De Koven's Robin Hood in a production directed, managed, and produced by Daniel V. Arthur with Misha Ferenzo as Robin. She gave performances in this show in theaters in Iowa, Oklahoma, Arkansas, Tennessee, Texas, Louisiana, Alabama, Georgia, South Carolina, North Carolina, Virginia, and New Jersey under the billing of Enrica Dilli.

In 1914 Dillon was scheduled to perform at the Palacio de Bellas Artes in Mexico City, but the Battle of Veracruz conflict between the United States and Mexico forced her to flee Mexico and return to the United States before that could happen. In March 1915 she performed a concert with the composer-pianist Amy Beach at the MacDowell Club of New York. In November 1915 she was the soprano soloist in Verdi's Messa da Requiem at Carnegie Hall with conductor Giulio Setti using the billing of Adele Dilli. Just prior to the outbreak of World War I she portrayed Marta in Tiefland at the Century Opera House in New York City.

== Opera director and music educator ==
Illness led to a decline in Dillon's singing voice which caused her to cease performing. She worked as a voice and drama teacher during World War I where her pupils included soprano Dorothy Jardon and Metropolitan Opera contralto Carolina Lazzari. She was also active as a voice and drama teacher to opera singers in New York City. In 1920 The Musical Courier credited her as significantly improving the acting among the younger opera singers working at the Metropolitan Opera and the Chicago Opera Association; many of whom were her pupils.

When not in New York and Connecticut, Dillon spent the summer at a farm she owned in Harrison, Maine known as Louise Orchard. She began this practice in 1916. Some of her pupils, such as soprano Myrna Sharlow, would travel up to Maine to continue lessons. Among her notable pupils were Evelyn Herbert, Richard Crooks, Marie Sundelius, Kathryn Meisle, and Frederick Jagel.

She then served as the first director of the Washington Opera Company from 1919 to 1927. She moved to Philadelphia in 1927, where for three years she taught singing and was director of the Philadelphia Operatic Society. From 1930 to 1935, she worked for Herbert Witherspoon as a vocal coach and stage director at first the Chicago Civic Opera and then the Chicago Grand Opera Company. She also maintained a home in New York City during the 1930s where she had a voice studio and directed operas for the New York Singing Teachers Association and the New York Opera Guild.

In 1936, Dillon founded the Deertrees Theatre in Harrison, which was later the home of Dillon's Deertree Opera Company (DOC). The DOC presented its first season in 1940. Many theatres were closed down during World War II, and the opera company only presented three seasons of performances before the theatre was closed in 1942. Metropolitan Opera conductor Karl Kritz served as the company's music director and primary conductor. Hermann Weigert also served on the company's conducting staff. Notable singers to have performed with the company included a young Astrid Varnay just prior to her triumphant Met debut and soprano Elisabeth Carron in her professional opera debut.

== Death ==
Enrica Clay Dillon died on October 9, 1911 in Harrison, Maine. At the time of her death she was in the midst of organizing a summer opera festival to be held in July 1947, after already presenting a summer opera festival in 1946, at the re-opened Deertree Theatre.
