= Josephine Dillon =

American actress and drama teacher (1884–1971)

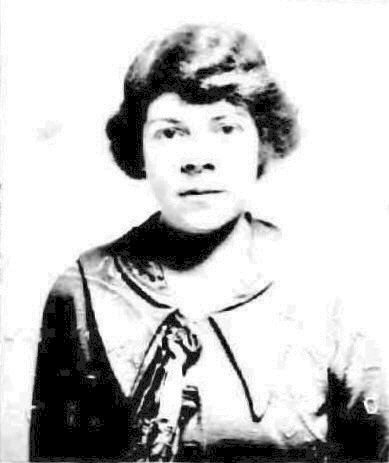
- U.S. passport photo from 1918
- Born: January 26, 1884; Denver, Colorado, U.S.
- Died: November 11, 1971 (aged 87); Glendale, California, U.S.
- Resting place: Calvary Cemetery, East Los Angeles
- Other name: Josephine Dillon Gable
- Education: Stanford University
- Occupations: Actress, acting teacher
- Spouse: Clark Gable (m. 1924; div. 1930)
- Relatives: Enrica Clay Dillon (sister)

Josephine Dillon (January 26, 1884 – November 11, 1971) was an American stage and film actress and acting teacher. She was Clark Gable's patron, acting coach and first wife.

== Early years and education ==
Born in Denver, Colorado, Dillon was one of six children of Judge Henry Clay Dillon. She was the younger sister of opera singer Enrica Clay Dillon. Dillon's father became a district attorney in Los Angeles while her mother was a prominent socialite. Dillon was educated in the California public school system and in Europe. She later studied acting at Stanford University.

== Career ==
After graduating from Stanford in 1908, Dillon studied acting in Italy for one year before returning to the United States to act on Broadway for actor Edward Everett Horton's stock company in New York City. Dillon eventually decided to give up her career to teach acting. She relocated to Portland, Oregon where she opened "the Little Theatre", an acting school attended by wealthy area students.

It was at the Little Theatre that Dillon met a then unknown aspiring actor 17-years her junior named W. C. Gable, while she was working as a stage director for the Red Lantern Players. Initially, she was Gable's acting coach but the two began a romantic relationship after Dillon took a special interest in Gable. Dillon became his patron, paying to have his teeth fixed and hair styled. She guided him in building up his chronically undernourished body, and taught him better body control and posture. She spent considerable time training his naturally high-pitched voice, which Gable slowly managed to lower, and to gain better resonance and tone. As his speech habits improved, Gable's facial expressions became more natural and convincing. After the long period of rigorous training, Dillon eventually considered him ready to attempt a film career in Los Angeles.

Dillon moved to Los Angeles in the summer of 1924 where she opened The Dillon Stock Company. Five months later, Gable joined her. They were married shortly thereafter on December 18, 1924. On the marriage license, Gable claimed he was 24 years old while Dillon claimed she was 34. Dillon continued to work with Gable on his acting and voice while he went to auditions. During this time, Gable followed Dillon's advice to use his middle name, "Clark", as his professional name. Over the next few years, Clark Gable's career gained momentum with stage and minor film roles. After appearing in the play Machinal in 1929 and shortly before he was signed with M-G-M, Gable asked Dillon for a divorce. Dillon later recalled that he had asked for a divorce several times before but she refused as she did not believe he meant it. She filed for legal separation on March 28, 1929. Their divorce became final on April 1, 1930. Two days later, Gable married wealthy socialite Maria Franklin Prentiss Lucas Langham, nicknamed "Rhea".

== Later career ==
In 1940, Dillon began teaching acting at Christian College (later Columbia College) in Columbia, Missouri. That same year, she wrote Modern Acting. The book describes in detail the training that she put Gable through over a six and a half year period. Upon returning to California, Dillon continued teaching acting. Her students included Bruce Cabot, Gary Cooper, Donna Reed, Rita Hayworth and Linda Darnell. In 1944, she made her only two film appearances in bit roles in The Lady and the Monster and Men on Her Mind.

In the years following their divorce, Clark Gable became one of the most popular leading men of the era and would win an Academy Award in 1934. He also went on to marry four more times. Gable rarely spoke publicly about his marriage to Dillon. In a statement issued by M-G-M in 1932, Gable denied rumors that he had married Dillon solely to further his career. He claimed he was motivated only by love and added that he "owed [Dillon] a debt of gratitude" for guiding his early career. Dillon, who never remarried, refused to speak disparagingly about her famous ex-husband. She would only say the two were married "in name only", implying the marriage was not consummated. Dillon's cousin later said that Dillon "carried a torch up to her dying day for [Gable]. That was her one and only real love."

Throughout the 1950s and early 60s, Dillon continued to teach acting and lived in a small home in the San Fernando Valley. In July 1956, Confidential magazine published a story claiming that Dillon was "down and out" and that Clark Gable refused to help her. Dillon denied the story was true and later testified against the editors of the magazine in a libel trial in August 1957. After the trial, Dillon lost many of her acting students due to the publicity. She nearly lost her home and later revealed that Gable had sent her money to avoid foreclosure. After Gable's death in November 1960, the press reported that his will stipulated that the remainder of Dillon's mortgage be paid in full by his estate.

== Later years and death ==
Dillon continued working as an acting teacher until poor health forced her to retire in the mid-1960s. In the years following Gable's death, several biographies of the actor were published that mentioned his marriage to Dillon. She later reported that she regularly received abusive and insulting letters and telephone calls from Gable fans despite the fact that she never publicly disparaged him.

On November 11, 1971, she died after a "lengthy illness" at a Rockhaven Sanitarium in Glendale, California. She is interred at Calvary Cemetery in East Los Angeles.

== Filmography ==
- Men on Her Mind (1944) - Undetermined Role (uncredited)
- The Lady and the Monster (1944) - Mary Lou's Grandmother (Last appearance)
