= Francesco Mottino =

Italian opera singer

- Born: Francesco Mottino c. 1833; Cuorgnè, Piedmont, Italy
- Died: 11 February 1919; Milan, Italy
- Occupation(s): opera singer, acting teacher, writer
- Spouse: Adele Cesarini

Francesco Mottino (c. 1833 – 11 February 1919) was an Italian opera singer, acting teacher and writer. He had an operatic career, mostly in Italy in the 1850s and 1860s, and mostly in England in the 1870s. After retiring from the stage, he worked actively as a writer and teacher in his native country.

== Early life and singing career ==
Mottino was born in Cuorgnè, Piedmont. He began his career writing for magazines and also performing in Italy in plays by Shakespeare. He studied singing at the Milan Conservatory from 1855. While there, he began his opera career in Italy playing smaller baritone roles. During the 1860s, he appeared at various Italian opera houses and abroad. He performed the title role in Verdi's I due Foscari at several houses.

He performed in England and Ireland during the 1870s. He appeared in London concerts, including at The Crystal Palace and Surrey Gardens Music Hall, among other venues. He was engaged for a season of opera in 1872 at St. George's Hall in London, playing the title role in The Barber of Seville, Belcore in L'elisir d'amore and Guglielmo in Cosi fan tutte. The following year, in Dublin, he repeated his Figaro and played Count di Luna in Il trovatore and Valentine in Faust. He was the first leading baritone of the Carl Rosa Opera Company in 1875, touring with that company in England. Rosa hired Mottino largely because of his mastery of the English language, which enabled him to sing Italian operas in English with excellent pronunciation and diction. With that company, he reprised his Luna and Valentine and sang the title role in Don Giovanni. In 1876–1877, he toured with the Imperial Opera Company, with whom he reprised his Luna, Valentine and Don Giovanni and also sang the roles of Count Almaviva in The Marriage of Figaro, Germont in La Traviata and the title role in Rigoletto. In 1877 he also sang the title role in the world premiere of Rossi's Bjorn in London.

== Writing, editing and teaching ==
Mottino returned to Milan with his wife, soprano Adele Cesarini (born 1829), and continued to perform briefly in Italy. In 1880, he retired from the stage, and that year he founded a literary magazine, L'Utopista, and ran it until 1887, both editing and contributing articles and poetry. He also wrote the librettos for Giovanni Consolini's Il conte di Salto (1894) and Cesare Rossi's I fuggitivi (1896), among others, as well as plays, poetry and novels. He was, for several decades, a teacher of elocution and acting in Milan. Among his pupils were sopranos Enrica Clay Dillon and Marcella Craft.

Mottino died in 1919 at his home in Milan at the age of 85.
