= The Gay Senorita =

1945 film directed by Arthur Dreifuss

- Theatrical poster for the film
- Directed by: Arthur Dreifuss
- Screenplay by: Edward Eliscu
- Story by: J. Robert Bren
- Produced by: Jay Gorney
- Starring: Jinx Falkenburg; Jim Bannon; Steve Cochran
- Cinematography: Burnett Guffey
- Edited by: Al Clark
- Production company: Columbia Pictures
- Release date: August 9, 1945 (US)
- Running time: 69 minutes
- Country: United States
- Language: English

The Gay Senorita is a 1945 American comedy-drama film directed by Arthur Dreifuss, which stars Jinx Falkenburg, Jim Bannon, and Steve Cochran.

== Plot ==
In Los Angeles, when Dona Maria Sandoval wants to build a street which will highlight Latin American culture, naming it Sandoval Lane, she learns that businessman J.J. Frentiss has other plans for the location, a large warehouse. Despite pleas from Dona Maria and her two nieces, Elena and Loreta, J.J. refuses to change his plans. J.J. asks his nephew, Phil, to intercede with the women and convince them to sell their property.

Through subterfuge, Phil is introduced to the Sandoval family. He becomes romantically interested in Elena, who thinks his name is Phil Dolan, a singer in a local Latin society orchestra. Phil, an architect, becomes interested in the Sandoval's project, and agrees to become the official architect of the project. In making the agreement, the Sandovals turn over the deed to their property to Phil as security.

Meanwhile, J.J. has traveled to New York City on business. While there, he is approached by members of the Mexican Consulate, who thank him for his support of the Sandoval project in promoting Latin American culture. J.J. is furious and immediately flies back home to Los Angeles. He confronts his nephew, exposing his lies to the Sandoval family, and lets them know that he is still going through with his plan for the warehouse, which has been made easier now with Phil's obtaining the property lease.

Elena and the rest of the Sandoval family feel betrayed by Phil, but he asks them to give him a little time to make things right. Phil's attempted plan goes awry, but in the end J.J. is swayed to allow the Sandoval project to go through, and agrees to move the location of his warehouse.

== Cast ==
- Jinx Falkenburg as Elena Sandoval
- Jim Bannon as Phil Frentiss, also known as Phil Dolan
- Steve Cochran as Tomas Obrion, also known as Tim O'Brien
- Corinna Mura as Corinna Mura
- Isabelita as Chiquita
- Thurston Hall as J. J. Frentiss
- Isabel Withers as Kitty
- Marguerita Sylva as Dona Maria Sandoval
- Luisita Triana as Loreto
- Lola Montes as Lola Montez
- Tommy Cook as Paco
- Nina Bara as Lupita
- Leander de Cordova as Padre Anselmo
- Eddie Fields as Pablo
- Antonio Triana as Anastasio

== Production ==
The working title of the film was Fiesta Town. Sam White was originally scheduled to produce the film but was replaced by Jay Garney in October 1944. In April 1945 it was reported that the former opera star, Marguerite Sylva had been signed to play the role of Dona Maria.

== Reception ==
The Film Daily gave the film a positive review, particularly pointing out the unique backdrop of the film. They praised the direction and cinematography, and gave good notices to the performances of Corinna Mura, Isabelita, and Luisita Triana.
