= The Arrow Show =

American TV variety series (1948–1949)

- Also known as: The Phil Silvers Arrow Show; Arrow Comedy Theatre
- Genre: Variety
- Directed by: Wes McKee; William H. Brown Jr.
- Presented by: Phil Silvers; Hank Ladd
- Starring: Jack Gilford; Joey Faye; Jack Diamond; Danny Dayton; Connie Sawyer; Jerry Hausner; Jack Clifford
- Announcer: Dan Seymour
- Music by: Ray Bloch
- Country of origin: United States
- Original language: English

Original release
- Network: NBC
- Release: November 24, 1948 – May 19, 1949

The Arrow Show is an American television variety series that was broadcast on NBC November 24, 1948 - May 19, 1949. It was also known as The Phil Silvers Arrow Show and Arrow Comedy Theatre. The sponsor was Arrow Shirts.

== Overview ==
Phil Silvers was the host from the premiere through March 1949; Hank Ladd succeeded him for the duration of the series. In addition to weekly guest stars, the show had "a rotating stable of 'regulars'", with Jack Gilford being the only regular who was there for the program's full run. Other regulars included Joey Faye, Jack Diamond, Danny Dayton, and the Harry Mack Triplets. Ray Bloch's orchestra provided music, and Dan Seymour was the announcer. Guest stars on the program included Georgia Gibbs, Peter Lorre, and Rudy Vallee

== Production ==
The show's producers were David Levy and Rod Erickson; Wes McKee and William H. Brown Jr. directed. The program originated from WNBT. Competition included American Minstrels of 1949 on ABC, Operation Success on DuMont, and Kobbs Korner on CBS. Hooperatings of regularly scheduled sponsored TV programs in New York had The Arrow Show in the top 10 in January 1949 (eighth with a rating of 35.6) and February 1949 (ninth, 32.1).

== Critical response ==
A review of the premiere episode in the trade publication Billboard called the show "the first good comedy show of its kind in video", and added that it avoided routines that many comedians had transferred from vaudeville to TV. The review complimented Silvers's sketches.

A subsequent Billboard review after Silvers's departure commented, "... the strong personality of Silvers was missed as an integrating force." The review suggested that Gilford's performance might merit expanding his role, and it complimented the singing of Janet Blair. It noted, "This show still is in the molding stage" and suggested that addition of blackouts and sketches might be beneficial.
