= Donovan's Brain =

1942 science fiction novel by Curt Siodmak

- First edition cover (publ. Knopf; Cover art by W. Deffaa
- Author: Curt Siodmak
- Genre: Science fiction
- Publisher: American Mercury
- Publication date: 1942
- ISBN: 978-1-584-45078-8

Donovan's Brain is a 1942 science fiction novel by American writer Curt Siodmak.

The novel was an instant success and has been adapted to film three times. Since then the book has become something of a cult classic, with fans including Stephen King, who discussed the novel in his 1981 book Danse Macabre and mentions it in his novel/miniseries It. Siodmak later wrote a sequel in 1968 titled Hauser's Memory and wrote a final sequel in 1991 titled Gabriel's Body.

== Plot ==
The novel is written in the form of diary entries by Dr. Patrick Cory, a middle-aged physician whose experiments at keeping a brain alive are subsidized by Cory's wealthy wife. Under investigation for tax evasion and criminal financial activities, millionaire megalomaniac W.H. Donovan crashes his private plane in the desert near the home of Dr. Cory. The physician is unable to save Donovan's life, but removes his brain on the chance that it might survive, placing the gray matter in an electrically charged, oxygenated saline solution within a glass tank. The brainwaves indicate that thought – and life – continue. Cory makes several futile attempts to communicate with it. Finally, one night Cory receives unconscious commands, jotting down a list of names in a handwriting not his own – it is Donovan's. Cory successfully attempts telepathic contact with Donovan's brain, much to the concern of Cory's occasional assistant, Dr. Schratt, an elderly alcoholic.

Gradually, the malignant intelligence takes over Cory's personality, leaving him in an amnesiac fugue state when he awakes. The brain uses Cory to do his bidding, signing checks in Donovan's name, and continuing the magnate's illicit financial schemes. Cory becomes increasingly like the paranoid Donovan, his physique and manner morphing into the limping image of the departed criminal. Donovan's bidding culminates in an attempt to have Cory kill a young girl who stands in the way of his plans. Realizing he will soon have no control over his own body and mind, his assistant, Schratt, devises a plan to destroy the brain during its quiescent period. Schratt resists the brain's hypnotic power by repeating the rhyme, "Amidst the mists and coldest frosts he thrusts his fists against the posts and still insists he sees the ghosts." Schratt destroys the housing tank with an axe and leaves the brain of Donovan to die, thus ending his reign of madness. During the encounter, however, the brain, attempting to defend itself, orders Schratt's heart to stop beating. Schratt dies, but bearing a look of fulfillment.

== Publication history ==
The novel was initially published as a three-part serial in the September–November 1942 issues of the pulp magazine Black Mask. The first complete edition was published by Alfred A. Knopf in 1943, and it was provided to U.S. military personnel as an Armed Services Edition during World War II. The work has since been translated into French, German, Portuguese, Italian, Japanese, and Dutch.

== Adaptations ==
Radio adaptations starring, respectively, Orson Welles and John McIntire aired in 1944 and 1948 as part of the anthology series Suspense. In 1982, the LP album release of the 1944 version won the Grammy Award for Best Spoken Word Album.

The novel has been adapted for the screen three times – in 1944 as The Lady and the Monster (later re-issued as Tiger Man), in 1953 under its original title, and in 1962 as Vengeance (later reissued as The Brain). There was also a television adaptation, which aired in 1955—also under the original title—as part of the anthology series Studio One; it starred Wendell Corey and E. G. Marshall.

== See also ==
- Hauser's Memory
