= Along Fifth Avenue =

American musical revue

- Sheet music
- Music: Gordon Jenkins
- Lyrics: Tom Adair
- Book: Charles Sherman and Nat Hiken

Along Fifth Avenue is a revue in two acts with sketches by Charles Sherman and Nat Hiken; music by Gordon Jenkins, Richard Stutz, Milton Pascal and Hiken; and lyrics by Tom Adair, Stutz, Pascal and Hiken. It was produced on Broadway in 1949.

== Production ==
After a try-out in Boston, the Philadelphia try-out of Along Fifth Avenue was supposed to open at the Forrest Theatre for two weeks beginning Monday, November 29, 1948, but the opening was postponed one day to Tuesday, November 30, 1948, to get the production installed. One of the stars, Willie Howard, withdrew during the try-out because of illness, was replaced by Jackie Gleason, and the show was held over in Philadelphia for another week.

Along Fifth Avenue premiered on Broadway at Broadhurst Theatre on January 13, 1949, moved to the Imperial Theatre in February, and closed on June 18, 1949, after 180 performances. The opening night cast starred Nancy Walker, Carol Bruce, Jackie Gleason, Louise Kirtland, and Hank Ladd. The show was produced by Arthur Lesser. The musical staging was by Robert Sidney, with additional direction by Charles Friedman. The scenic design was by Oliver Smith, with costume design by David Ffolkes and lighting design by Peggy Clark. Willie Howard died on January 14, 1949, the day after the show opened in New York, at the age of 62.

== Synopsis ==
The revue's theme was the city of New York. The sketches and songs were set mostly in recognizable city backdrops like a restaurant, a hospital, chic shops on Fifth Avenue, an upper East Side mansion, a midtown skyscraper, outside on Fifth Avenue and at iconic New York landmarks like Rockefeller Center, Washington Square Park, and Harlem.

== Songs ==
Act I

- “Fifth Avenue”
- "The Best Time of Day"
- “A Window on the Avenue”
- “If This Is Glamour”
- "Skyscraper Blues"
- “I Love Love in New York”
- “The Fugitive from Fifth Avenue”
- "Santo Dinero"

Act II

- "In the Lobby"
- “Weep No More”
- “Chant D’Amour”
- "Vacation in the Store"
- “Call It Applefritters”
- “A Trip Doesn’t Care at All”
- "Fifth Avenue" (reprise)

== Reception ==
Dan Dietz, in The Complete Book of 1940s Broadway Musicals, wrote: "William Hawkins of New York World Telegram felt Nancy Walker's material came off best, otherwise, Jackie Gleason made 'more of his comic material than anyone could expect' and Donald Richards sang 'a pretty dull' number 'as if he really cared'."

== Sources ==
- Chapman, John (ed.) The Burns Mantle Best Plays of 1948–1949, Dodd, Mead and Company, New York, 1949.
- Dietz, Dan, The Complete Book of 1940s Broadway Musicals, Rowman & Littlefield, New York, 2015.
