= Robert Sidney (choreographer) =

American choreographer

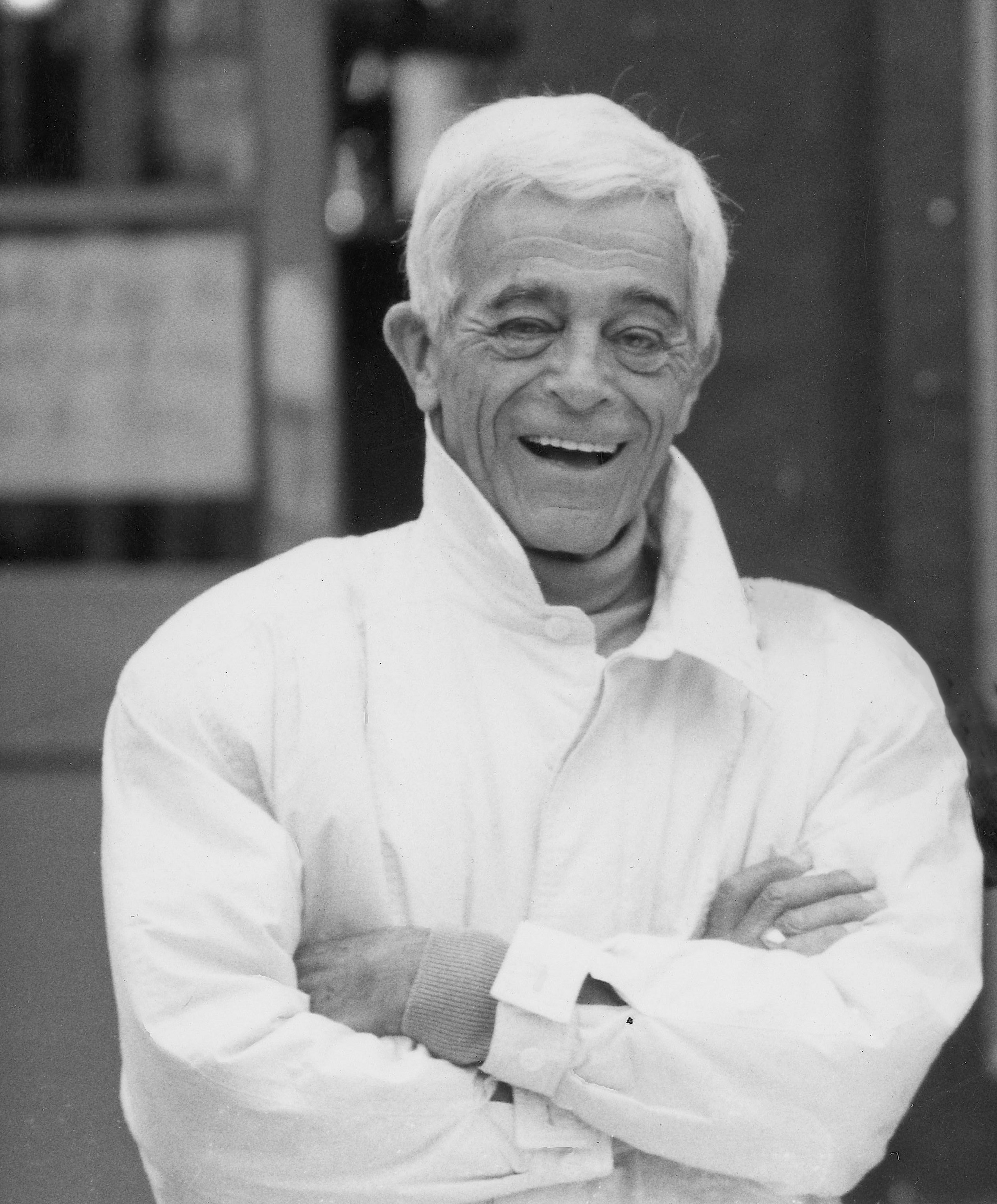
- Sidney in 1987
- Born: October 9, 1909; New York City, U.S.
- Died: March 26, 2008 (aged 98); Los Angeles, U.S.
- Occupation(s): Choreographer, dancer
- Years active: 1936-1999

Signature
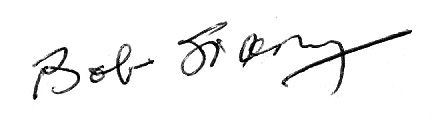

Robert Sidney (October 9, 1909 – March 26, 2008) was an American choreographer who was responsible for many film, television and stage dance productions between the 1940s and 1970s.

== Life and career ==
Born in New York City, Sidney studied at New York University, where he took part in a drama group. Self-taught as a dancer, he made his Broadway debut in 1936 in On Your Toes, toured with I Married an Angel in 1938, and in 1940 appeared in Keep Off the Grass, directed by ballet dancer George Balanchine. He also worked with Eddie Cantor in Banjo Eyes, and became an assistant to Broadway director Hassard Short.

In World War II, he was assigned to the Special Services Division. He was principal choreographer in the racially-integrated stage show This Is The Army, written by Irving Berlin, which featured on Broadway in 1942 and then toured military bases in Europe, North Africa and the Pacific, and was also involved in the film version, starring Ronald Reagan.

After the war he choreographed several Broadway shows, including those by Bing Crosby, before moving to Hollywood and being placed under contract to Columbia Pictures, where he worked with Rita Hayworth on The Loves of Carmen. He did the "musical staging" for the 1949 Broadway revue, Along Fifth Avenue, which ran for 180 performances, starring Nancy Walker and Jackie Gleason. He later worked for other companies including Fox, MGM, RKO, and Paramount, and choreographed actresses including Cyd Charisse, Debbie Reynolds, and Mitzi Gaynor. Among the movies on which he worked were Party Girl, Where the Boys Are, The Silencers, The Singing Nun, and Valley of the Dolls.

Sidney also worked extensively in television, including The Dean Martin Show, and several televised versions of stage musicals. He choreographed four Academy Awards shows, and worked on the nightclub and Las Vegas shows of Mitzi Gaynor, Cyd Charisse, Debbie Reynolds, Betty Hutton and others.

He founded the Professional Dancers Society, a charitable organisation, and in 2003 published an autobiography, With Malice Towards Some: Tales From A Life Dancing With Stars.

He died in Los Angeles in 2008, from pneumonia, aged 98.
