= Donovan's Brain (film) =

1953 film by Felix E. Feist

- Theatrical release poster
- Directed by: Felix Feist
- Screenplay by: Felix Feist
- Based on: adapted by Hugh Brooke from the novel "Donovan's Brain" by Curt Siodmak
- Produced by: Tom Gries
- Starring: Lew Ayres; Gene Evans; Nancy Davis; Steve Brodie; Tom Powers; Lisa Howard
- Cinematography: Joseph Biroc A.S.C.
- Edited by: Herbert L. Strock
- Music by: Eddie Dunstedter
- Production companies: Allan Dowling Presents; Dowling Productions, Inc.
- Distributed by: United Artists
- Release date: September 30, 1953
- Running time: 83 minutes (US); 78 minutes (UK)
- Country: United States
- Language: English

Donovan's Brain is an independently made 1953 American black-and-white science fiction horror film, produced by Tom Gries for Allan Dowling Productions, directed by Felix Feist, that stars Lew Ayres, Gene Evans, Nancy Davis and Steve Brodie. The film was distributed by United Artists and is based on the 1942 horror novel Donovan's Brain by Curt Siodmak.

The story involves an attempt to keep alive the brain of millionaire megalomaniac W.H. Donovan after an otherwise fatal plane crash. The brain develops strange powers and begins to possess people.

== Plot ==
Original trailer

Dr. Patrick Cory and his wife Janice live in a mountain retreat where Cory attempts to keep a monkey's brain alive after having it removed from the monkey's skull.

The private plane of businessman Warren Donovan crashes near Cory's cabin, and rescuers request Cory's help. Donovan is seriously injured and is taken to Cory's cabin. There, his heart stops, so Cory takes the businessman's brain for experimentation. Cory manages to keep the brain alive in an electrified saline solution. After writing messages in Donovan's handwriting while he is sleeping, Cory believes Donovan's consciousness still survives and he attempts to communicate with the brain.

Gradually, Cory begins to exhibit Donovan's personality traits such as smoking cigars, using ruthless personal manipulation, and walking with a limp. Janice and Frank Schratt, Cory's friend and assistant, suspect that Donovan's consciousness is using telepathic mind control to overpower Cory's free will. In the meantime, news photographer Yocum discovers that Cory has illegally stolen Donovan's brain and demands money to keep the secret.

Donovan's brain grows increasingly powerful, using Cory to collect a financial fortune and taking control of Yocum's mind and forcing him into a fatal car crash. After realizing that Donovan can control only one person at a time, Janice and Frank plot to destroy the brain. However, Frank's plan goes wrong when Donovan forces Frank to shoot himself. Ultimately, lightning strikes the Cory home and a fire breaks out, burning Donovan's brain and bringing an end to the horror. Frank survives, and Cory willingly goes to accept the consequences for his actions, while Janice reminds the authorities that it was Patrick's idea, in a moment of freedom from Donovan's brain, to connect the ranch's lightning rod to the power supply, which resulted in the fire.

== Cast ==
- Lew Ayres as Dr. Patrick Cory
- Gene Evans as Dr. Frank Schratt
- Nancy Davis as Janice Cory
- Steve Brodie as Yocum, investigative news photographer
- Tom Powers as Donovan's Washington advisor
- Lisa K. Howard as Chloe, Donovan's daughter
- Kyle James as Chief Ranger Tuttle who accuses Dr. Schratt of drunkenness
- Victor Sutherland as Nathaniel Fuller, Donovan's lawyer
- Michael Colgan as Tom, Donovan's son
- Peter Adams as Mr. Webster
- Harlan Warde as Treasury agent Brooke who, along with Agent Smith, investigates Dr. Cory's withdrawal of $27,000
- Shimen Ruskin as Tailor from whom Dr. Cory orders Donovan's expensive suits

Uncredited (in order of appearance)
John Hamilton	Mr. MacNish, bank manager who gives Dr. Cory $27,000
Don Brodie	mustachioed detective who follows Dr. Cory from hotel
Charles Sullivan	passenger in car at scene of Dr. Cory's accident
Max Wagner	station agent

== See also ==
- The Lady and the Monster (1944), an earlier film adaptation of the novel
- The Brain (1962), a later film adaptation of the novel
- The Brain That Wouldn't Die (1962)
- The Man with Two Brains (1983). Dr. Hfuhruhurr, played by Steve Martin, mentions Donovan's Brain is his favorite movie.
