= The Lady and the Monster =

1944 film by George Sherman

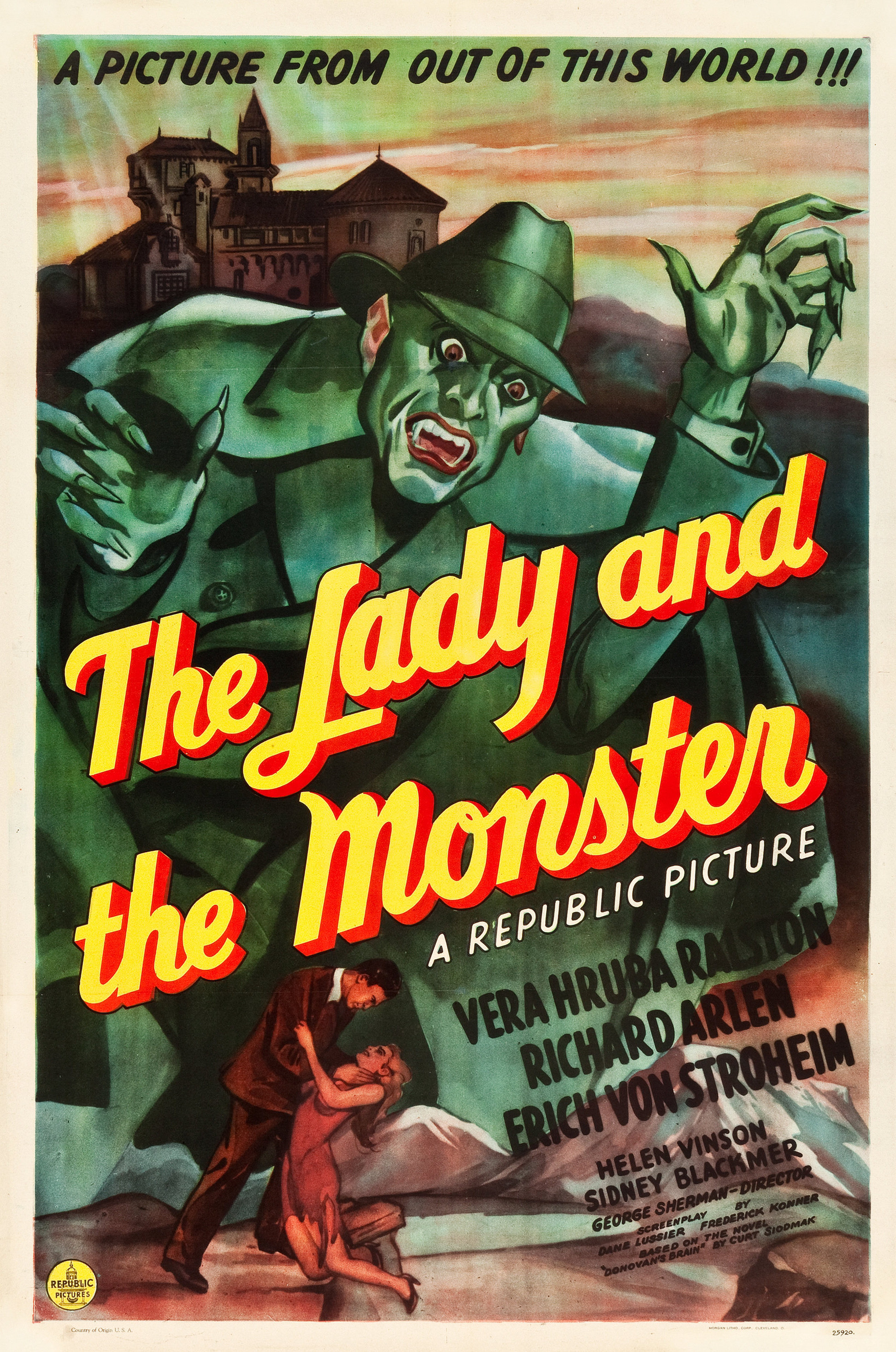
- Film poster
- Directed by: George Sherman
- Screenplay by: Dane Lussier; Frederick Kohner
- Based on: Donovan's Brain by Curt Siodmak
- Starring: Vera Ralston; Richard Arlen; Erich von Stroheim; Helen Vinson
- Cinematography: John Alton
- Edited by: Arthur Roberts
- Music by: Walter Scharf
- Production company: Republic Pictures Corp.
- Distributed by: Republic Pictures Corp.
- Release date: 30 March 1944 (Los Angeles)
- Running time: 86 minutes
- Country: United States

The Lady and the Monster is a 1944 American science fiction horror film directed by George Sherman, and starring Vera Ralston, Richard Arlen, and Erich von Stroheim. It is the first of three film adaptations of the 1942 novel Donovan's Brain by Curt Siodmak. The film is about the attempts to keep alive the brain of a multimillionaire after his death, only to create a telepathic monster. The man then takes over the medical assistant's mind, and the "lady" of the title has to fight it. The film's copyright was renewed in 1971, so it will enter the American public domain in 2040.

== Plot ==
Professor Franz Mueller is the proud owner of his self-built advanced scientific laboratory set in an old castle in the middle of the Arizona desert. Mueller specializes in research on the human brain and obsessively conducts experiments on brain tissue, believing that a human brain can be maintained even after the body dies. He also believes that the knowledge contained in a deceased person's brain can be transferred to another person. Mueller is assisted in his attempts to prove his theory by another scientist, Patrick Cory, and his young Czechoslovak-American ward, Janice Farrell.

Mueller is painfully aware of the fact that his assistants are attracted to each other, but since Mueller himself is in love with Janice he does everything in his power, including abusing his position as a boss, to assign Cory to additional late night work and use the fact that the young man is far too devoted to his work, to keep the two love-birds apart and improve his own chances.

When a plane crashes in the desert close to the laboratory one night, Mueller is asked by the rangers investigating the cause of the crash to take care of the only surviving man until a physician arrives. The man dies before the doctor gets there and is declared dead. The physician, Dr. Martin, reassures Mueller that someone will come to take care of the body the next day, but while waiting for that person, Mueller decides to test his theory about brain maintenance. With the help of his instruments Mueller is able to detect that the man's brain is still alive enough to use. Before the body is reclaimed he and Cory remove the brain. They are also able to determine, from searching through the dead man's clothes, that the body belongs to an infamous investment banker named William H. Donovan.

In the morning the wife of the late banker, Mrs. Chloe Donovan, arrives with the family lawyer, Eugene Fulton, to transport the remains from the castle. Upon arrival the lawyer inquires of Mueller about the late Donovan's last words and Mueller tells him that there were none, since the man died without regaining consciousness after the crash. Not believing that Mueller is entirely truthful, Fulton remains in the nearby area to further investigate the last hours of Donovan's life before he was declared dead. Despite Janice's pleading Cory insists on staying at the castle to finish the experiment with the brain. Through spying on the castle Fulton finds out that Donovan's brain is still intact in a container, but he doesn't act to retrieve it from the scientists, rather allowing them to continue the experiment, well aware that Donovan didn't leave a penny for his wife in his will. Fulton has his own interest in the matter, since he is Mrs. Donovan's lover, and he secretly hopes that the scientist succeeds in making the brain work, so he can extract information about where Mr. Donovan has hidden away his fortune. When Mueller and Cory treat the brain with plasma, it gains the ability to communicate with the world through telepathy. The brain tells Cory that he must go to the Los Angeles Federal Prison. The plasma stimulation continues with higher and higher doses, even though Janice tries to interrupt the treatment, and soon Cory's brain is hijacked by the late Donovan's brain entirely. Completely under the influence of the brain, Cory leaves for Los Angeles Federal Prison and manages to withdraw cash from one of Donovan's hidden accounts. He also manages to convince the police to re-open the investigation against a convicted murderer by the name of Roger Collins. Still under the influence of Donovan, Cory visits Roger Collins in the prison.

Donovan's brain continues to keep complete hold over Cory. Through Cory it tries to force Fulton to help release Collins from prison, but Fulton refuses, claiming that the evidence against him is too overwhelming. A teenager named Mary Lou has witnessed the crime and as long as she sticks to her story the case is too strong. In an attempt to free Cory from the influence of Donovan's brain, Janice finds out from an investigator named Grimes, hired by Mrs. Donovan and Fulton, that Cory is trying to bribe the witnesses to withdraw their statements. Grimes has knowledge of Donovan's dirty business and believes that there might be a connection between Collins and Donovan's earlier attempts to get rid of reluctant business counterparts. He also suspects that Donovan will try to get rid of Mary Lou in the same way, using Cory's body. It turns out he is right in his suspicion, as Cory forces Janice to go with him in the car when he tries to run Mary Lou over. When she stops him he tries to kill her instead. In a sting of jealousy, Mueller's housekeeper and mistress-wannabe feeds sedatives to the brain and it loses its control over Cory, who regains his consciousness. The awakened Cory tells Janice that Collins in fact is Donovan's unknown son, and that Donovan was the one who committed the murder that Collins was convicted for. Having returned to the castle in Arizona Cory tries to abort the experiment, but is hindered by Mueller. They struggle, Mueller is shot by the housekeeper, and the brain is smashed to the floor. Cory goes on to help free Collins, and Janice waits for him to complete a short prison sentence for his involvement in the brain experiment.

== Cast ==
- Vera Ralston as Janice Farrell
- Richard Arlen as Dr. Patrick Cory
- Erich von Stroheim as Prof. Franz Mueller
- Helen Vinson as Chloe Donovan
- Mary Nash as Mrs. Fame, the housekeeper
- Sidney Blackmer as Eugene Fulton
- Janet Martin as the café singer
- William Henry as Roger Collins
- Charles Cane as Mr. Grimes
- Juanita Quigley as Mary Lou
- Josephine Dillon as Mary Lou's grandmother
- Antonio Triana as himself
- Lola Montes as herself

== Production ==
The film went under several working titles, including Donovan's Brain, The Monster's Castle, The Monster and The Brute. It was based on Curt Siodmak's novel Donovan's Brain released in 1942. Among the cast was Josephine Dillon, in her first role in a film for more than a decade, and former ice skater Vera Hruba Ralston in her first dramatic performance in film.

The film began shooting in October 18, and finished shooting in early November 1943.

== Release ==
The Lady and the Monster was distributed theatrically by the Republic Pictures Corp. It was first shown in Los Angeles March 30, 1944, and New York on April 7, 1944. It received a wider release on April 17, 1944. On its release in Britain, the film was titled The Lady and the Doctor. In 1949, the film was re-edited and re-released as The Tiger Man.

== Reception ==
A contemporary reviewer in The New York Times found that the film had "lost an intriguing title and a large portion of plausibility and pace" from the original novel, and that the film was " a mite too lethargic. In this case, Donovan's brain probably could stand a shot of adrenaline.

From retrospective reviews, it received a two-and-a-half star rating from Leonard Maltin's Movie Guide, calling it "[a] Pretty good chiller". James Robert Parish and Michael R. Pitts declared the film in their book The Great Science Fiction Films as "lightweight entertainment" with Erich Von Stroheim providing 'some scene-chewing moment in his intense characterization of Professor Franz Mueller".

== See also ==
- Isolated brain
- Donovan's Brain, a 1953 film adaptation of the novel
- The Brain, a 1962 film adaptation of the novel
- The Brain That Wouldn't Die
- The Incredible 2-Headed Transplant
- List of American films of 1944
