= The Brain (1962 film) =

1962 British-German film by Freddie Francis

- Movie poster
- Directed by: Freddie Francis
- Written by: Robert Banks Stewart; Philip Mackie
- Based on: Donovan's Brain by Curt Siodmak
- Produced by: Artur Brauner; Raymond Stross
- Starring: Anne Heywood; Peter van Eyck; Cecil Parker; Bernard Lee
- Cinematography: Robert Huke
- Edited by: Oswald Hafenrichter
- Music by: Kenneth V. Jones
- Production companies: Central Cinema Company; Raymond Stross Productions
- Distributed by: British Lion/Columbia (UK); Europa-Filmverleih AG (West Germany); Governor Films (US, 1964)
- Release dates: October 9, 1962 (Germany); December 9, 1963 (United Kingdom); 1964 (U.S.)
- Running time: 84 minutes (UK/Germany); 83 minutes (US)
- Countries: United Kingdom; West Germany
- Languages: English; German

The Brain, also known as Vengeance and Ein Toter sucht seinen Mörder, is a 1962 UK-West German co-production science fiction thriller film directed by Freddie Francis and starring Anne Heywood and Peter van Eyck. It was written by Robert Banks Stewart and Philip Mackie adapted from the 1942 Curt Siodmak novel Donovan's Brain. In this film, differing from earlier adaptations, the dead man Max Holt seeks his murderer through hypnotic contact with the doctor Peter Corrie keeping his brain alive. It was one in a series of films produced by Raymond Stross, starring his wife Heywood.

Freddie Francis later called it "a film I should have left early on."

== Plot ==
Dr Peter Corrie and his colleague Dr. Frank Shears remove the brain from the corpse of tycoon Max Holt, who was injured in an air-crash but subsequently died. Corrie attempts to keep the removed brain alive in a chemical bath. The brain hypnotically controls him, and Corrie suspects Holt was murdered. Corrie is framed for the murder of Holt's chauffeur Thomas Gabler, and under the brain's control, Corrie almost commits murder himself. Shears disconnects the brain's support system, and Corrie tracks down Holt's murderer.

== Cast ==
- Anne Heywood as Anna Holt
- Peter van Eyck as Dr. Peter Corrie
- Cecil Parker as Stevenson
- Bernard Lee as Dr. Frank Shears
- Jeremy Spenser as Martin Holt
- Maxine Audley as Marion Fane
- Ellen Schwiers as Ella
- Siegfried Lowitz as Mr. Walters
- Hans Nielsen as Immerman
- Jack MacGowran as Furber
- Miles Malleson as Dr. Miller
- George A. Cooper as Thomas Gabler
- Victor Brooks as farmer at crash site (uncredited)
- Allan Cuthbertson as Da Silva (uncredited)
- John Junkin as Frederick (uncredited)
- Bryan Pringle as dance hall MC (uncredited)
- Patsy Rowlands as young woman at dance hall (uncredited)
- Alister Williamson as Inspector Pike (uncredited)

== Production ==
The film had two producers, Artur Brauner and Raymond Stross. Stross' involvement was conditional upon Anne Heywood starring in the movie. Francis recalled Stross "had told Artur Brauner that Anne Heywood was the biggest female name in Britain. This is one of the things that happens in this business. Somebody who is really so bright can still be fooled."

The movie's original title was Over My Dead Body.

According to Francis, a week before filming Brauner told Stross he wanted a German actor to play the killer rather than Stross's choice. So two versions of the film were made, one with Heywood as the killer, another with a different actor as the killer. Francis had the continuity person, Pamela Davis, rewrite the script accordingly. Francis also says Peter Van Eyck disliked Heywood and refused to come on set at the same time as her.

== Critical reception ==
Monthly Film Bulletin wrote: "This preposterous mixture of crime, horror and science fiction, with a dash or two of neurosis, art and medical ethics stirred in, comes off unexpectedly well. With some notable photography credits to his record, director Freddie Francis not surprisingly has an eye for the startling or sinister image: the shadowy airport, the wild-eyed portrait of the telepathic tycoon, the brain dying in a swirl of chemicals. Once past the turgid dialogue of the opening scenes in the laboratory, direction, script and editing keep things roaring along with piled-on complications confusing the trails, and a neat pay-off. A strong cast gives momentary credibility to the hocus-pocus, with Jeremy Spenser enjoyable as a repulsive father-hater. But pointless miplausibilities in the story – brain-baths apart – will jar on the observant spectator. And it's a bit much having apparently two alcoholics in one picture."

The Radio Times Guide to Films gave the film 3/5 stars, writing: "Hammer Horror veteran Freddie Francis does a decent job directing this version of Curt Siodmak's Donovan's Brain. Peter Van Eyck is the scientist controlled by the power-crazed organ of a sadistic tycoon kept alive after a plane crash. More of a mystery than an all-stops-out horror, the moody tale has some eerie moments and is efficiently involving. A competent cast injects new life into a familiar story."

Leslie Halliwell said: "Twisty remake of Donovan's Brain [1953], not too badly done."

== See also ==
- The Lady and the Monster, a 1944 film adaptation of the novel
- Donovan's Brain, a 1953 film adaptation of the novel

== Notes ==
- Dixon, Wheeler W. (1991). The films of Freddie Francis. Scarecrow Press.
