= Curt Siodmak =

German-American novelist (1902–2000)

- Born: Kurt Siodmak; August 10, 1902; Dresden, Germany
- Died: September 2, 2000 (aged 98); Three Rivers, California, US
- Occupations: Novelist and filmmaker
- Relatives: Robert Siodmak (brother)
- Writing career
- Period: 1929–2000
- Genres: Short stories, novels and screenplays

Curt Siodmak (August 10, 1902 – September 2, 2000) was a German-American novelist, screenwriter and director. He is known for his work in the horror and science fiction film genres, with such films as The Wolf Man and Donovan's Brain (the latter adapted from his novel of the same name). He was the younger brother of noir director Robert Siodmak.

== Early life and education ==
Siodmak was born Kurt Siodmak in Dresden, Germany, the son of Rosa Philippine (née Blum) and Ignatz Siodmak. His parents were both from Jewish families in Leipzig. Siodmak acquired a degree in mathematics before beginning to write novels.

== Career ==
He invested early royalties earned by his first books in the 1929 movie Menschen am Sonntag, a documentary-style chronicle of the lives of four Berliners on one Sunday, based on their own lives. The movie was co-directed by Curt Siodmak's brother Robert and Edgar G. Ulmer, with a script by Billy Wilder in collaboration with Fred Zinnemann and cameraman Eugen Schüfftan. Siodmak was the nephew of film producer Seymour Nebenzal, who funded Menschen am Sonntag with funds borrowed from his father, Heinrich Nebenzahl.

In the following years Siodmak wrote many novels, screenplays, and short stories, including the novel F.P.1 antwortet nicht (F.P.1 Doesn't Answer) (1932) which was adapted into a film featuring Hans Albers and Peter Lorre.

Siodmak decided to emigrate after hearing an anti-Semitic tirade by the Nazi propaganda minister Joseph Goebbels, and departed for England where he made a living as a screenwriter before moving to the United States in 1937. His big break in Hollywood came with the screenplay for The Wolf Man (1941), starring Lon Chaney Jr., which established the titular fictional creature as the most popular movie monster after Dracula and Frankenstein's monster. In the film, Siodmak created several werewolf "legends" — being marked by a pentagram; being practically immortal apart from being struck/shot by silver implements/bullets; and the famous verse:

Even a man who is pure of heart,
And says his prayers by night
May become a wolf when the wolfsbane blooms
And the autumn moon is bright

(The last line was changed in the sequels to "And the moon is full and bright".)

Siodmak's science-fiction novel Donovan's Brain (1942) was a bestseller that was translated into many languages and was adapted for the cinema several times, beginning in 1943 with The Lady and the Monster, then 1953's Donovan's Brain and 1962's The Brain. Other films he wrote the screenplays for include Earth vs. the Flying Saucers, I Walked with a Zombie and The Beast with Five Fingers. An extensive interview with Siodmak about his career in both Germany and Hollywood is found in Eric Leif Davin's Pioneers of Wonder. In the plots of his work, Siodmak utilised the latest scientific findings, combining those with pseudo-scientific motifs like the Jekyll and Hyde complex, the Nazi trauma and the East–West dichotomy.

In 1998, he won the Berlinale Camera at the 48th Berlin International Film Festival.

== Death ==
Siodmak died in his sleep on September 2, 2000, at his home in Three Rivers, California.

== Bibliography ==
=== Novels ===
- F.P.1 Doesn't Answer (1933)
- Black Friday (1939)
- Donovan's Brain (1942)
- The Beast with Five Fingers (1945)
- Whomsoever I Shall Kiss (1952)
- Riders to the Stars (1954) (novelisation of the film Riders to the Stars)
- Skyport (1959)
- For Kings Only (1964)
- Hauser's Memory (1968)
- The Third Ear (1971)
- City in the Sky (1974)
- Frankenstein Meets Wolfman (1981) (novelization of the film Frankenstein Meets the Wolf Man)
- Gabriel's Body (1991)

=== Short stories ===
- The Eggs from Lake Tanganyika (1926)
- Variation of a Theme (1972)
- The P Factor (1976)
- Experiment with Evil (1985)

=== Non-fiction ===
- Even a Man Who Is Pure in Heart: The Life of a Writer, Not Always to His Liking (1997)
- Wolf Man's Maker (2001) (Posthumous autobiography)

== Filmography ==
Title	Year	Credited as				Notes	Ref(s)
Title	Year	Director	Screenwriter	Screen story writer	Other	Notes	Ref(s)
Mascots	1929		Yes			Notes	
Escape to the Foreign Legion	1929		Yes				
People on Sunday	1930				Yes	Based on reportage by Siodmak	
The Shot in the Sound Film Studio	1930		Yes	Yes			
Der Kampf mit dem Drachen oder: Die Tragödie des Untermieters	1930		Yes				
The Man in Search of His Murderer	1931		Yes				
Der Ball	1931		Yes				
Le Bal	1931		Yes				
The Invisible Front	1932		Yes				
F.P. 1 antwortet nicht	1932		Yes				
I.F. 1 ne répond plus	1932		Yes				
F.P.1	1933		Yes				
Marion, That's Not Nice	1933		Yes				
Model Wanted	1933		Yes				
Girls Will Be Boys	1934		Yes				
The Crisis is Over	1934			Yes			
It's a Bet	1935		Yes				
Abdul the Damned	1935		Yes				
The Crouching Beast	1935				Yes	Treatment	
I Give My Heart	1935				Yes	Treatment	
The Tunnel	1935		Yes				
Non-Stop New York	1937		Yes				
Her Jungle Love	1938		Yes				
The Invisible Man Returns	1940		Yes				
Black Friday	1940		Yes				
The Ape	1940		Yes	Yes			
The Invisible Woman	1940			Yes			
Aloma of the South Seas	1941			Yes			
Pacific Blackout	1941			Yes			
The Wolf Man	1941		Yes				
Invisible Agent	1942		Yes				
London Blackout Murders	1943		Yes				
Frankenstein Meets the Wolf Man	1943		Yes				
The Mantrap	1943		Yes				
False Faces	1943		Yes				
I Walked with a Zombie	1943		Yes				
The Purple V	1943		Yes				
Son of Dracula	1943			Yes			
The Climax	1944		Yes				
House of Frankenstein	1945			Yes			
Frisco Sal	1945		Yes				
Shady Lady	1945		Yes				
The Return of Monte Cristo	1945			Yes			
The Beast with Five Fingers	1946		Yes				
Berlin Express	1946			Yes			
Tarzan's Magic Fountain	1949		Yes				
Bride of the Gorilla	1951	Yes	Yes				
The Magnetic Monster	1953	Yes	Yes				
Riders to the Stars	1954		Yes				
Creature with the Atom Brain	1955		Yes	Yes			
Curucu, Beast of the Amazon	1956	Yes	Yes				
Earth vs. the Flying Saucers	1956			Yes			
Love Slaves of the Amazons	1957	Yes	Yes		Yes	Producer	
The Devil's Messenger	1962		Yes				
The Brain	1962			Yes		Based on "Donovan's Brain"	
Sherlock Holmes and the Deadly Necklace	1962		Yes				
The Lightship	1963		Yes				
Ski Fever	1966	Yes	Yes				
Ritual	2002		Yes			Based on I Walked With a Zombie	
The Wolfman	2010		Yes			Based on The Wolf Man (1941)	

== Film adaptations ==
- The Shot in the Sound Film Studio, directed by Alfred Zeisler (1930, based on the novel Schuß im Tonfilmatelier)
- F.P.1 antwortet nicht, directed by Karl Hartl (1932, based on the novel F.P.1 antwortet nicht)
  - I.F.1 ne répond plus, directed by Karl Hartl (1933, based on the novel F.P.1 antwortet nicht)
  - F.P.1, directed by Karl Hartl (1933, based on the novel F.P.1 antwortet nicht)
- Girls Will Be Boys, directed by Marcel Varnel (1934, based on the play The Last Lord)
- The Lady and the Monster, directed by George Sherman (1944, based on the novel Donovan's Brain)
- Donovan's Brain, directed by Felix E. Feist (1953, based on the novel Donovan's Brain)
- Studio One: Donovan's Brain (1955, TV series episode, based on the novel Donovan's Brain)
- The Brain, directed by Freddie Francis (1962, based on the novel Donovan's Brain)
- Hauser's Memory, directed by Boris Sagal (1970, TV film, based on the novel Hauser's Memory)
- Der Heiligenschein, directed by Heinz Schirk (1977, TV film, based on the story Variation of a Theme)
