= E. G. Marshall =

American actor (1914–1998)

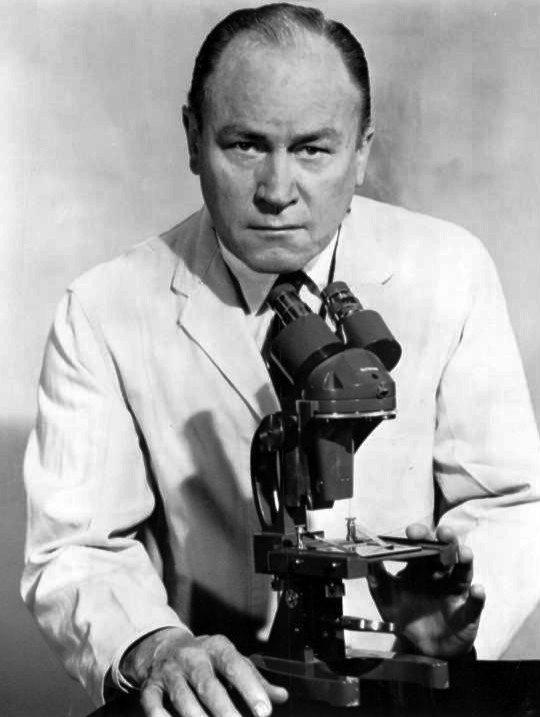
- Marshall in 1970, as Doctor David Craig in The Bold Ones
- Born: Everett Eugene Grunz; June 18, 1914; Owatonna, Minnesota, U.S.
- Died: August 24, 1998 (aged 84); Bedford, New York, U.S.
- Occupation: Actor
- Years active: 1945–1998
- Spouses: Helen Wolf (m. 1931; div. 1953) Judith Coy (m. 1958)
- Children: 5

Everett Eugene Grunz (June 18, 1914 – August 24, 1998), known professionally as E. G. Marshall, was an American actor. One of the first group of actors selected for the new Actors Studio, Marshall, by 1948, had performed in major plays on Broadway.

Among his film roles, Marshall is perhaps best known as the unflappable and analytical Juror 4 in Sidney Lumet's courtroom drama 12 Angry Men (1957). He starred in the CBS legal drama The Defenders, played the President of the United States in Superman II (1980), and Nazi collaborator Henri Denault on the CBS prime-time drama Falcon Crest in 1982. Marshall was also known as the host of the radio drama series CBS Radio Mystery Theater (1974–1982).

== Early life ==
Marshall was born Everett Eugene Grunz in Owatonna, Minnesota, the son of Hazel Irene (née Cobb) and Charles G. Grunz. During his life, he chose not to reveal what "E. G." stood for, saying that it stood for "Everybody's Guess." The U.S. Social Security Claims Index states that he was listed with the Social Security Administration in June 1937 as Everett Eugene Grunz, and in December 1975 as E.G. Marshall.

Marshall claimed in interviews in later life to have attended both Carleton College and the University of Minnesota, but there is no evidence that he ever attended either institution, or had attended college at all.

== Career ==
He took the surname "Marshall" for his acting career. Although most familiar for his later television and movie roles, which gained wide audiences, Marshall also had a distinguished Broadway career. In 1948, having already performed in the original New York productions of The Skin of Our Teeth and The Iceman Cometh, Marshall joined Marlon Brando, Montgomery Clift, Julie Harris, Kim Stanley, and 45 others to make up the first group of actors granted membership in the newly formed Actors Studio. In subsequent years, he landed the leading roles in The Crucible and Waiting for Godot.

Marshall achieved perhaps his highest profile as top-billed star of the CBS-TV legal drama The Defenders (1961-1965). Marshall portrayed Manhattan defense attorney Lawrence Preston, for which he won two Emmys. He later played Dr. David Craig in the television series The Bold Ones: The New Doctors (1969–1973), and Nazi collaborator Henri Denault on the CBS prime-time drama Falcon Crest in 1982.

In 1973, Marshall returned to the live stage to play the title role in a well-received production of Macbeth at the Virginia Museum Theatre in Richmond, Virginia, under the direction of Keith Fowler. The production was highly praised by the New York Times. From January 1974 until February 1982, Marshall was an occasional participant and the original host of the popular nightly radio drama, The CBS Radio Mystery Theater.

In film, Marshall was known for playing Juror 4 in 12 Angry Men (1957), District Attorney Harold Horn in Compulsion (1959), Colonel Jerome Pakenham in Town Without Pity (1961), Colonel Rufus S. Bratton in Tora! Tora! Tora! (1970), Arthur in Interiors (1978), the President of the United States in Superman II (1980), Arthur "Art" Smith (Ellen's father) in National Lampoon's Christmas Vacation (1989), John N. Mitchell in Nixon (1995), and Walter Sullivan in Absolute Power (1997). His final performance was a reprisal of his role as Lawrence Preston in two TV Movies based on The Defenders.

Marshall was selected as a Fellow of the American Bar Association and an officer of the American Judicature Society, a national organization of judges, lawyers, and lay persons devoted to promoting the effective administration of justice.

== Personal life ==
Marshall was married twice. He married Helen Wolf in 1931. They had two daughters—Jill and Degen. Their marriage ended in divorce in 1953. He married Judith Coy in 1958. They had two sons and a daughter — Sam, Jud, and Sarah. They remained married until his death.

As a member of the Committee for National Health Insurance, Marshall was a long-time advocate of government-provided health care in the United States. During the 1968 United States presidential campaign, he filmed and narrated a political advertisement endorsing Democratic candidate Hubert Humphrey.

== Death ==
Marshall died of lung cancer at his home in Bedford, New York, on August 24, 1998, at age 84.

== Filmography ==
=== Film ===
- 1945 The House on 92nd Street as Attendant At Morgue (uncredited)
- 1946 13 Rue Madeleine as Emile (uncredited)
- 1947 Untamed Fury as Pompano, the dance caller
- 1948 Call Northside 777 as Rayska (uncredited)
- 1952 Anything Can Happen as Immigration Officer (scenes deleted)
- 1954 The Caine Mutiny as Lieutenant Commander Challee
- 1954 Broken Lance as Governor Horace
- 1954 Pushover as Police Lieutenant Carl Eckstrom
- 1954 The Bamboo Prison as Father Francis Dolan
- 1954 The Silver Chalice as Ignatius
- 1955 The Left Hand of God as Dr. David Sigman
- 1956 The Scarlet Hour as Lieutenant Jennings
- 1956 The Mountain as Solange
- 1957 The Bachelor Party as Walter
- 1957 12 Angry Men as Juror #4
- 1957 Man on Fire as Sam Dunstock
- 1958 The Buccaneer as Governor William C. C. Claiborne
- 1959 The Journey as Harold Rhinelander
- 1959 Compulsion as District Attorney Harold Horn
- 1960 Cash McCall as Winston Conway
- 1961 Town Without Pity as Colonel Jerome Pakenham
- 1966 The Chase as Val Rogers
- 1966 Is Paris Burning? as Intelligence Officer Powell (uncredited)
- 1969 The Bridge at Remagen as Brigadier General Shinner
- 1969 The Learning Tree (uncredited)
- 1970 Tora! Tora! Tora! as Colonel Rufus S. Bratton
- 1971 The Pursuit of Happiness as Daniel Lawrence
- 1975 The Incredible Machine as Narrator (documentary)
- 1977 Billy Jack Goes to Washington as Senator Joseph Paine
- 1978 Interiors as Arthur
- 1980 Superman II as The President of the United States
- 1981 Gangster Wars as The Narrator (voice)
- 1982 Creepshow as Upson Pratt (segment "They're Creeping Up On You")
- 1986 My Chauffeur as Witherspoon
- 1986 Power as Senator Sam Hastings, Ohio
- 1986 La Gran Fiesta as Judge Cooper
- 1989 National Lampoon's Christmas Vacation as Art Smith
- 1990 Two Evil Eyes as Steven Pike (segment "The Facts in the Case of Mr. Valdemar")
- 1992 Consenting Adults as George Gordon
- 1992 Russian Holiday as Joe Meadows
- 1993 Tornadoes!! The Entity as The Narrator (documentary)
- 1995 Nixon as John N. Mitchell
- 1997 Absolute Power as Walter Sullivan
- 2006 Superman II: The Richard Donner Cut as The President of the United States

=== Television ===
E. G. Marshall television credits
| Year | Title | Role | Notes |
|---|---|---|---|
| 1949–1958 | Studio One | (various) | 6 episodes |
| 1954 | Middle of the Night | Jerry | Live TV broadcast. The Philco-Goodyear Television Playhouse |
| 1955 | Studio One | Dr. Shratt | Episode "Donovans' Brain" (S7.E24) |
| 1957 | Alfred Hitchcock Presents | Ronald Grimes | Episode: "Mail Order Prophet" |
| 1957 | Suspicion | Paul Steppe | Episode: "Four O'Clock" |
| 1960 | The Islanders | Curt Cober | Episode: "Forbidden Cargo" (ABC) |
| 1961 | Rawhide | Ben Foley | Episode: "Incident of the Broken Word" (S3.E11) (CBS) |
| 1961–1965 | The Defenders | Lawrence Preston | 132 episodes (CBS) |
| 1966 | The Poppy Is Also a Flower | Coley Jones | TV movie |
| 1969 | The Littlest Angel | God | TV movie |
| 1969–1973 | The Bold Ones: The New Doctors | Dr. David Craig | 45 episodes (NBC) |
| 1970 | The Brady Bunch | J.P. Randolph | 1 episode |
| 1971 | Ellery Queen: Don't Look Behind You | Dr. Edward Cazalis | TV movie |
| 1971 | Night Gallery | Jared Soames, The Funeral Director | 1 episode |
| 1972 | Ironside | Dr. David Craig | 1 episode |
| 1972 | Pursuit | James Wright | ABC Movie of the Week |
| 1976 | Collision Course: Truman vs. MacArthur | President Harry S. Truman | TV movie |
| 1977 | Equal Justice Under Law | Himself | TV miniseries |
| 1979 | Vampire | Harry Kilcoyne | TV movie |
| 1982–1983 | Falcon Crest | Henri Denault | 3 episodes |
| 1983 | Kennedy | Joseph P. Kennedy | TV miniseries |
| 1986 | Tales from the Darkside | Grandfather | Episode: "Seasons of Belief" |
| 1987 | At Mother's Request | Franklin Bradshaw | TV miniseries |
| 1988 | The Equalizer | Senator Virgil Thomas Blake | Episode: "The Last Campaign" |
| 1989 | ‘’Murder, She Wrote (1989 TV series)’’ | Prof. Leon Walker | Episode: “Alma Murder season 5#ep15” |
| 1988–1989 | War and Remembrance | Dwight D. Eisenhower | TV miniseries |
| 1993 | The Tommyknockers | Ev Hillman | TV miniseries |
| 1994–1995 | Chicago Hope | Dr. Arthur Thurmond | 8 episodes |
| 1997 | Miss Evers' Boys | The Senate Chairman | TV movie |
| 1997 | The Defenders: Payback | Lawrence Preston | TV movie |
| 1998 | The Defenders: Choice of Evils | Lawrence Preston | TV movie |

== Discography ==
- 1956 Waiting for Godot with Bert Lahr
- 1960 Ulysses: Soliloquies Of Molly And Leopold Bloom as read by Siobhan McKenna, E.G. Marshall.
- 1978 The Great Debates: Hamilton And Jefferson with Shepperd Strudwick
- 1981 Justice Holmes' Decisions (nominated for Grammy Award for Best Spoken Word, Documentary or Drama Recording in 1982)
- 1985 Runaway Jonah And Other Biblical Adventures by Jan Wahl
