= Hank Ladd =

American actor and writer (1908–1982)

Henry Ladd (December 12, 1908 – June 9, 1982) was an American actor and writer of radio, film and stage.

== Life and career ==
Ladd was born on December 12, 1908, in Chicago, Illinois. He was an actor and writer, known for Las Vegas Nights (1941), The Colgate Comedy Hour (1950), and The Jackie Gleason Show (1966). He was a comedian and monologist on radio, nightclubs, TV, stage and film, known for his dry, sardonic delivery. He performed in vaudeville, nightclubs and commercials, and wrote books and TV scripts (The Judy Canova Show). Ladd appeared in USO tours and appeared in the musical revue Along Fifth Avenue in 1949. He appeared on Jackie Gleason's show Jackie Gleason and His American Scene Magazine and also served as a writer on the show.

On Broadway, he appeared in Angel in the Wings (1947) as a monologist and master of ceremonies and he also wrote some of the sketches for the show. Brooks Atkinson of The New York Times writing about the show said, "To tell the truth, there isn't much else in it except Hank Ladd, a saturnine-looking wag who can make a mildly spoken story sound hilarious and does."

Ladd was married to Francetta Malloy, an actress, who died on July 17, 1978. He died in Los Angeles on June 9, 1982.

== Radio and television programs ==
He was one of three comedians to play Beetle the ghost on The Phil Baker Show for the CBS and NBC Radio Networks from 1931 to 1939 in Chicago. His other radio shows included Columbia Workshop (#149), a radio play by William Saroyan, which aired August 10, 1939; he was a member of a comedy team with Bert Wheeler of Wheeler and Woolsey fame that was featured on The New Old Gold Show for NBC-BLUE (1941-1942); Command Performance (#30), starring Bing Crosby, James Cagney, and Larry Adler, which aired August 30, 1942; and The Judy Canova Show episode "A Quiet Christmas Party", which aired December 21, 1946. He was the host of The Arrow Show on NBC-TV (1949) and appeared in Waiting for The Break on NBC-TV (1950).

== Film ==
- Las Vegas Nights (1941)
- Laffing Time (1959)
- The Errand Boy (1961)

== Stage appearances ==
In the 1940s, he appeared in the following Broadway musicals:

- New Priorities of 1943 (September 15 – October 11, 1942).
- Angel in the Wings (December 11, 1947 – September 4, 1948)
- Along Fifth Avenue (January 13 – June 18, 1949).
