= List of French films of 1953 =

French films released in 1953

A list of films produced in France in 1953.

== A–Z ==
| Title | Director | Cast | Genre | Notes |
|---|---|---|---|---|
| Act of Love | Anatole Litvak | Kirk Douglas, Dany Robin, Barbara Laage | Romance | Co-production with US |
| The Adventurer of Chad | Willy Rozier | Madeleine Lebeau, Jean Danet, Tania Fédor | Adventure | |
| A Girl in the Sun | Maurice Cam | Myriam Bru, Henri Génès | Comedy | |
| Alarm in Morocco | Jean-Devaivre | Jean-Claude Pascal, Gianna Maria Canale, Erich von Stroheim | Adventure | Co-production with Italy |
| Arlette Conquers Paris | Viktor Tourjansky | Johanna Matz, Karlheinz Böhm, Paul Dahlke | Comedy | Co-production with West Germany |
| A Bachelor's Life | Jean Boyer | Roger Pierre, Geneviève Kervine, Jean-Marc Thibault, | Comedy | |
| The Baker of Valorgue | Henri Verneuil | Fernandel, Georges Chamarat, Leda Gloria | Comedy | Co-production with Italy |
| The Beauty of Cadiz | Raymond Bernard, Eusebio Fernández Ardavín | Luis Mariano, Carmen Sevilla, Jean Tissier | Musical | Co-production with Spain |
| The Blonde Gypsy | Jacqueline Audry | Tilda Thamar, Roger Pigaut | Drama | |
| Boum sur Paris | Maurice de Canonge | Jacques Pills, Armand Bernard | Comedy | |
| The Call of Destiny | Georges Lacombe | Jean Marais, Jacqueline Porel, Édouard Delmont | Comedy drama | |
| A Caprice of Darling Caroline | Jean Devaivre | Martine Carol, Jacques Dacqmine, Marthe Mercadier | Historical | |
| Carnival | Henri Verneuil | Fernandel, Jacqueline Pagnol, Pauline Carton | Comedy | |
| Children of Love | Léonide Moguy | Etchika Choureau, Joëlle Bernard, Lise Bourdin | Drama | |
| Companions of the Night | Ralph Habib | Françoise Arnoul, Raymond Pellegrin, Nicole Maurey, Noël Roquevert, Marthe Mercadier, Pierre Cressoy | Drama | |
| The Cucuroux Family | Émile Couzinet | Georges Rollin, Nathalie Nattier | Comedy | |
| Dortoir des grandes | Henri Decoin | Jean Marais, Françoise Arnoul, Denise Grey, Jeanne Moreau, Noël Roquevert | Crime | |
| Double or Quits | Robert Vernay | Zappy Max, Suzanne Dehelly, Danielle Godet | Comedy | |
| The Drunkard | Georges Combret | Pierre Brasseur, Monique Mélinand, François Patrice | Drama | |
| The Earrings of Madame de... | Max Ophüls | Danielle Darrieux, Charles Boyer | Drama | Nominated for 1 Oscar |
| Endless Horizons | Jean Dréville | Gisèle Pascal, Jean Chevrier | Drama | Entered into the 1953 Cannes Film Festival |
| The Eye Behind the Scenes | André Berthomieu | Henri Génès, Jeannette Batti, Nicole Maurey, Jean-Marc Thibault | Comedy | |
| The Father of the Girl | Marcel L'Herbier | Arletty, Suzy Carrier | Comedy | |
| The Fighting Drummer | Georges Combret | André Gabriello, Sophie Leclair | Comedy | |
| Finishing School | Bernard Vorhaus | Susan Stephen, Anna Maria Ferrero | Comedy | Co-production with Italy |
| Follow That Man | Georges Lampin | Bernard Blier, Suzy Prim | Crime | |
| Francoise Steps Out | Jacques Becker | Daniel Gélin, Louis Jourdan, Anne Vernon | Comedy drama | |
| Good Lord Without Confession | Claude Autant-Lara | Danielle Darrieux, Henri Vilbert, Claude Laydu | Drama | |
| The Healer | Yves Ciampi | Jean Marais, Danièle Delorme | Drama | |
| His Father's Portrait | André Berthomieu | Jean Richard, Michèle Philippe, Brigitte Bardot | Comedy | |
| A Hundred Francs a Second | Jean Boyer | Henri Génès, Philippe Lemaire | Comedy | |
| I Am an Informant | René Chanas | Madeleine Robinson, Paul Meurisse | Crime | |
| Julietta | Marc Allégret | Dany Robin, Jean Marais, Jeanne Moreau | Comedy | |
| The Knight of the Night | Robert Darène | Renée Saint-Cyr, Jean-Claude Pascal | Horror | |
| L'art de Michael | Charles Gerdes | Frank Stuart | Drama | |
| The Lady of the Camellias | Raymond Bernard | Micheline Presle, Gino Cervi, Roland Alexandre | Historical | Co-production with Italy |
| The Lady Without Camelias | Michelangelo Antonioni | Lucia Bosè, Gino Cervi | Drama | Co-production with Italy |
| The Last Robin Hood | André Berthomieu | Roger Nicolas, Nicole Maurey, Lucien Nat | Comedy | |
| Little Jacques | Robert Bibal | Jean-Pierre Kérien, Blanchette Brunoy | Drama | |
| The Long Teeth | Daniel Gélin | Danièle Delorme, Jean Chevrier, Olivier Hussenot | Comedy drama | |
| The Lottery of Happiness | Jean Gehret | Yves Deniaud, Suzanne Dehelly | Comedy | |
| The Love of a Woman | Jean Grémillon | Micheline Presle, Massimo Girotti, Gaby Morlay | Drama | Co-production with Italy |
| The Lovers of Marianne | Jean Stelli | Gaby Morlay, André Luguet | Comedy | |
| The Lovers of Midnight | Roger Richebé | Dany Robin, Jean Marais | Drama | |
| Lovers of Toledo | Henri Decoin, Fernando Palacios | Alida Valli, Pedro Armendáriz | Historical | Co-production with Italy and Spain |
| Lucrèce Borgia | Christian-Jacque | Martine Carol, Pedro Armendáriz | Historical | Co-production with Italy |
| The Merchant of Venice | Pierre Billon | Michel Simon, Massimo Serato | Drama | Co-production with Italy |
| The Midnight Witness | Dimitri Kirsanoff | Henri Guisol, Claude May, Catherine Erard, Raymond Pellegrin | Crime | |
| Minuit... Quai de Bercy | Christian Stengel | Madeleine Robinson, Erich von Stroheim | Crime | |
| Monsieur Hulot's Holiday | Jacques Tati | Jacques Tati | Comedy | Nominated for Oscar, +1 win, +1 nomination |
| Monsieur Scrupule, Gangster | Jacques Daroy | Tilda Thamar, Yves Vincent | Crime | |
| The Most Wanted Man | Henri Verneuil | Fernandel, Zsa Zsa Gabor, Louis Seigner | Comedy | |
| My Brother from Senegal | Guy Lacourt | Raymond Bussières, Annette Poivre | Comedy | |
| My Childish Father | Léon Mathot | Maurice Teynac, Jean Tissier, Arlette Poirier | Drama | |
| My Husband Is Marvelous | André Hunebelle | Fernand Gravey, Sophie Desmarets, Elina Labourdette | Comedy | |
| Naked in the Wind | Henri Lepage | Félix Oudart, Lili Bontemps, Armand Bernard | Comedy | |
| Napoleon Road | Jean Delannoy | Pierre Fresnay, Henri Vilbert | Comedy | |
| The Night Is Ours | Jean Stelli | Simone Renant, Jean Danet | Drama | |
| One Night in Megève | Raoul André | Jeannette Batti, Raymond Bussières, Paul Cambo | Comedy | |
| Open Letter | Alex Joffé | Robert Lamoureux, Geneviève Page, Jean-Marc Thibault | Comedy | |
| Operation Magali | László V. Kish | Raymond Souplex, Nicole Maurey, Germaine Montero | Thriller | |
| The Other Side of Paradise | Edmond T. Gréville | Erich von Stroheim, Denise Vernac | Drama | |
| Poison Ivy | Bernard Borderie | Eddie Constantine, Dominique Wilms, Howard Vernon | Crime | |
| The Porter from Maxim's | Henri Diamant-Berger | Yves Deniaud, Pierre Larquey | Comedy | |
| The Proud and the Beautiful | Yves Allégret | Michèle Morgan, Gérard Philipe | Drama | Co-production with Mexico |
| Puccini | Carmine Gallone | Gabriele Ferzetti, Märta Torén | Drama | Co-production with Italy |
| Quintuplets in the Boarding School | René Jayet | Valentine Tessier, Armand Bernard, Maurice Escande | Comedy | |
| The Return of Don Camillo | Julien Duvivier | Fernandel, Gino Cervi | Comedy | Co-production with Italy |
| Rhine Virgin | Gilles Grangier | Jean Gabin, Elina Labourdette, Andrée Clément | Crime | |
| Sins of Paris | Henri Lepage | André Claveau, Lysiane Rey, Georges Lannes | Comedy crime | |
| The Slave | Yves Ciampi | Daniel Gélin, Eleonora Rossi Drago | Crime, Drama | Co-production with Italy |
| The Sparrows of Paris | Maurice Cloche | Jean-Pierre Aumont, Virginia Keiley | Comedy | |
| Storms | Guido Brignone | Jean Gabin, Silvana Pampanini, Carla Del Poggio | Drama | Co-production with Italy |
| Their Last Night | Georges Lacombe | Jean Gabin, Madeleine Robinson, Robert Dalban | Crime | |
| Thérèse Raquin | Marcel Carné | Simone Signoret, Raf Vallone | Drama | Co-production with Italy |
| This Man Is Dangerous | Jean Sacha | Eddie Constantine, Colette Deréal, Grégoire Aslan | Crime, Thriller | |
| The Three Musketeers | André Hunebelle | Georges Marchal, Jean Martinelli, Gino Cervi | Adventure | Co-production with Italy |
| Too Young for Love | Lionello De Felice | Aldo Fabrizi, Marina Vlady | Comedy drama | Co-production with Italy |
| The Tour of the Grand Dukes | André Pellenc | Raymond Bussières, Denise Grey | Musical comedy | |
| The Treasure of Bengal | Gianni Vernuccio | Sabu, Luisella Boni | Adventure | Co-production with Italy |
| A Very Long Day. | Albert Stemler | Peter Hiller | Drama | |
| Virgile | Carlo Rim | Robert Lamoureux, Yves Robert | Comedy | |
| The Virtuous Scoundrel | Sacha Guitry | Michel Simon, Marguerite Pierry | Comedy | |
| Voice of Silence | Georg Wilhelm Pabst | Aldo Fabrizi, Jean Marais | Drama | Co-production with Italy |
| The Wages of Fear | Henri-Georges Clouzot | Yves Montand, Charles Vanel | Thriller / Adventure | Won BAFTA Award, +5 wins |
| When Do You Commit Suicide? | Émile Couzinet | Jean Tissier, Frédéric Duvallès | Comedy | |
| When You Read This Letter | Jean-Pierre Melville | Philippe Lemaire, Juliette Gréco, Yvonne Sanson | Drama | Co-production with Italy |
| White Mane | Albert Lamorisse | Alain Emery | Drama Short | Won Palme d'Or, +1 win, +1 nomination |
| A Woman's Treasure | Jean Stelli | François Périer, Marie Daëms, Jacques Morel | Comedy | |
| Women of Paris | Jean Boyer | Michel Simon, Brigitte Auber | Drama | |
| Wonderful Mentality | André Berthomieu | Jean Richard, Michèle Philippe | Comedy | |
| The World Condemns Them | Gianni Franciolini | Alida Valli, Amedeo Nazzari | Drama | Co-production with Italy |

== See also ==
- 1953 in France
