= List of Italian films of 1953 =

A list of films produced in Italy in 1953 (see 1953 in film):

== A-C ==
Title	Director	Cast	Genre	Notes
Addio, figlio mio!	Giuseppe Guarino	Marco Vicario, Rossana Podestà	Drama	
Aida	Clemente Fracassi	Sophia Loren, Lois Maxwell, Luciano Della Marra	Opera	Adaptation of Giuseppe Verdi's Aida. 1st starring role for Sophia Loren. All actors are dubbed by Opera singers.
Alarm in Morocco	Jean-Devaivre	Jean-Claude Pascal, Gianna Maria Canale, Erich von Stroheim	Adventure	Co-production with France
Anna perdonami	Amerigo Anton	Maria Frau, Aldo Fiorelli		
At the Edge of the City	Carlo Lizzani	Massimo Girotti, Marina Berti, Giulietta Masina	Crime drama	
Attanasio cavallo Vanesio	Camillo Mastrocinque	Kiki Urbani, Renato Rascel		
Il Bacio dell'Aurora				
The Baker of Valorgue	Henri Verneuil	Fernandel, Georges Chamarat, Leda Gloria	Comedy	Co-production with France
Balocchi e profumi	Natale Montillo; F.M. De Bernardi	Diana D'orsini, Cesare Danova		
Beat the Devil	John Huston	Humphrey Bogart, Jennifer Jones, Gina Lollobrigida	Adventure	Co-production with the UK
Le Boulanger de Valorgue	Henri Verneuil	Fernandel	Comedy drama	
Bread, Love and Dreams	Luigi Comencini	Gina Lollobrigida, Vittorio De Sica, Marisa Merlini	Pink neorrealism	Huge success. There are two sequels.
C'era una volta Angelo Musco	Giorgio Walter Chili	Rossano Brazzi, Angelo Musco	Biopic	
Canto per te	Marino Girolami	Giuseppe Di Stefano, Hélène Rémy	Comedy	
Canzoni a due voci	Gianni Vernuccio	Tito Gobbi, Isa Barzizza	Musical comedy	
Captain Phantom	Primo Zeglio	Maxwell Reed, Frank Latimore, Anna Maria Sandri	Adventure	
Condemned to Hang	Ladislao Vajda	Rossano Brazzi, Fosco Giachetti, Emma Penella	Historical	Co-production with Spain
La Carovana del peccato	Pino Mercanti	Franca Marzi, Luisa Poselli		
Carmen	Giuseppe Maria Scotese	Ana Esmeralda, Mariella Lotti	Drama	Co-production with Spain
Cavalcade of Song	Domenico Paolella	Alberto Sordi, Silvana Pampanini	Musical	
Il Cavaliere di Maison Rouge	Vittorio Cottafavi	Armando Francioli, Franca Marzi	Historical adventure	
Cavallina storna	Giulio Morelli	Carlo Danova, Carlo Ninchi	Drama	
Christ Among the Primitives			Short film	
Ci troviamo in galleria	Mauro Bolognini	Carlo Dapporto, Nilla Pizzi		
Cinema d'altri tempi	Steno	Lea Padovani, Walter Chiari		
Condannata senza colpa		Piero Lulli	Drama	
Condannatelo!	Luigi Capuano	Virgilio Riento, Nerio Bernardi, Paola Borboni	Drama	
Core furastiero	Armando Fizzarotti	Piero Lulli, Aldo Nicodemi		
Crepuscolo di un mondo				
Cristo è passato sull'aia			Drama	
Cuore di spia			Drama	

== D-G ==
Title	Director	Cast	Genre	Notes
The Daughter of the Regiment	Géza von Bolváry, Goffredo Alessandrini, Tullio Covaz	Antonella Lualdi, Theo Lingen, Isa Barzizza	Comedy	Co-production with France and Germany. Separate Austrian film released the same year
Di qua di là del piave	Sergio Grieco, Guido Leoni	Piero Lulli, Pietro Tordi		
Dieci canzoni d'amore da salvare	Flavio Calzavara	Jacques Sernas		
Disonorata senza colpa	Giorgio Walter Chili	Franco Pesce, Milly Vitale	Drama	
Eager to Live	Claudio Gora	Massimo Serato, Marina Berti, Marcello Mastroianni	Drama	
The Earrings of Madame de...	Max Ophüls	Charles Boyer, Danielle Darrieux, Vittorio De Sica	Drama	Co-production with France
Easy Years	Luigi Zampa	Nino Taranto, Clelia Matania, Giovanna Ralli	Drama	
Fatal Desire	Carmine Gallone	May Britt, Anthony Quinn, Ettore Manni	Comedy	
Finalmente libero!	Mario Amendola, Ruggero Maccari	Carlo Dapporto, Nadia Gray, Fulvia Franco	Comedy	
Francis the Smuggler	Gianfranco Parolini	Roberto Mauri, Doris Duranti	Drama	
El Frayle	Ermanno Olmi		Short film	
Empty Eyes	Antonio Pietrangeli	Gabriele Ferzetti, Irène Galter	Drama	
The Enchanting Enemy	Claudio Gora	Robert Lamoureux, Silvana Pampanini	Comedy	Co-production with Frasnce
L' Ennemi public no 1	Henri Verneuil	Fernandel, Zsa Zsa Gabor	Crime comedy	
L' Esclave	Yves Ciampi			Co-production with France
Too Young for Love	Lionello De Felice	Marina Vlady, Fernand Gravey		
Eva nera (1953 film)				
Femmina senza cuore	Renato Borraccetti	Renato Chiantoni, Maria Grazia Francia	Drama	
Fermi tutti arrivo io!	Sergio Grieco	Carlo Delle Piane, Carlo Romano		
La Figlia del forzato	Gaetano Amata	Arnoldo Foà, Luisa Rossi	Opera	
Finishing School	Bernard Vorhaus	Susan Stephen, Anna Maria Ferrero, Jacques Sernas	Comedy	Co-production with France
For You I Have Sinned	Mario Costa	Pierre Cressoy, Milly Vitale	Drama	
Frine, Courtesan of Orient	Mario Bonnard	Pierre Cressoy, Tamara Lees	Adventure	
Funniest Show on Earth	Mario Mattoli	May Britt, Totò	Comedy	
Gioconda				
Gioventù alla sbarra	Ferruccio Cerio	Giorgio Albertazzi, Isa Barzizza		
Giuseppe Verdi	Raffaello Matarazzo	Pierre Cressoy, Gaby André	Biographical musical melodrama	
Good Folk's Sunday	Anton Giulio Majano	Maria Fiore, Sophia Loren	Comedy	
Gran comora	Antonio Nediani			

== H-N ==
Title	Director	Cast	Genre	Notes
A Husband for Anna	Giuseppe De Santis	Silvana Pampanini, Amedeo Nazzari, Massimo Girotti	Drama	
I Always Loved You	Mario Costa	Amedeo Nazzari, Myriam Bru, Jacques Sernas	Drama	
I Chose Love	Mario Zampi	Renato Rascel, Tina Lattanzi, Marisa Pavan	Comedy	Co-production with France
Ieri, oggi, domani	Silvio Laurenti Rosa	Mario Carotenuto, Aldo Ronconi	Drama	
If You Won a Hundred Million	Carlo Campogalliani	Tino Scotti, Nerio Bernardi	Comedy	
Infame accusa	Giuseppe Vari	Piero Lulli, Folco Lulli, Marisa Merlini	Melodrama	
L' Italia e il mondo				
It Happened in the Park	Vittorio De Sica, Gianni Franciolini	Micheline Presle, Anna Maria Ferrero	Drama	
It's Never Too Late	Filippo Walter Ratti	Paolo Stoppa, Isa Barzizza	Comedy	
It Was She Who Wanted It!	Marino Girolami	Walter Chiari, Lucia Bosè, Carlo Campanini	Comedy	
Ivan, Son of the White Devil	Guido Brignone	Paul Campbell, Nadia Gray	Adventure	
Jealousy	Pietro Germi	Erno Crisa, Marisa Belli	Drama	
Jeunes Mariés	Gilles Grangier	Anne Vernon, François Périer		
Jolanda, the Daughter of the Black Corsair	Mario Soldati	May Britt, Marc Lawrence		
Koenigsmark	Solange Térac	Jean-Pierre Aumont, Silvana Pampanini	Drama	
The Lady of the Camellias	Raymond Bernard	Micheline Presle, Gino Cervi, Roland Alexandre	Historical	Co-production with France
The Lady Without Camelias	Michelangelo Antonioni	Lucia Bosé, Gino Cervi, Andrea Checchi	Drama	Co-production with France
Il Lago dei poeti				
Lasciateci in pace	Marino Girolami	Nando Bruno, Virgilio Riento	Comedy	
Legione straniera	Basilio Franchina	Emma Baron, Giulio Cali	Adventure	
Lettere di condannati a morte della resistenza				
Love in the City	Federico Fellini, Michelangelo Antonioni, Alberto Lattuada, Carlo Lizzani, Francesco Maselli, Dino Risi, Cesare Zavattini	Ugo Tognazzi, Marco Ferreri	Drama	Six episodes, close to Italian neorealism
The Love of a Woman	Jean Grémillon	Micheline Presle, Massimo Girotti, Gaby Morlay	Drama	Co-production with France
Lovers of Toledo	Henri Decoin, Fernando Palacios	Alida Valli, Pedro Armendáriz	Historical	Co-production with France and Spain
Loving You Is My Sin	Sergio Grieco	Jacques Sernas, Luisa Rossi	Drama	
Lucrèce Borgia	Christian-Jaque	Martine Carol, Pedro Armendáriz	Historical	Co-production with France
Lulu	Fernando Cerchio	Valentina Cortese, Jacques Sernas	Drama	
La Lupa	Alberto Lattuada	Kerima, Ettore Manni	Drama	
Una Madre ritorna	Roberto Bianchi Montero	Gianni Rizzo, Linda Sini	Drama	
Man, Beast and Virtue	Steno	Totò, Orson Welles	Comedy	
The Man from Cairo	Ray Enright	George Raft, Gianna Maria Canale	Thriller	Co-production with the UK
Martin Toccaferro	Leonardo De Mitri	Peppino De Filippo, Titina De Filippo	Comedy	
Matrimonial Agency	Giorgio Pastina	Delia Scala, Aroldo Tieri	Comedy	
The Merchant of Venice	Pierre Billon	Michel Simon, Andrée Debar	Drama	Co-production with France
Musoduro	Giuseppe Bennati	Fausto Tozzi, Marina Vlady	Drama	Co-production with France
My Life Is Yours	Giuseppe Masini	Armando Francioli, Patricia Roc	Drama	
Naples Sings	Armando Grottini	Giacomo Rondinella, Virna Lisi	Musical	
Neapolitans in Milan	Eduardo De Filippo	Eduardo De Filippo, Anna Maria Ferrero	Comedy	
Neapolitan Turk	Mario Mattoli	Totò, Isa Barzizza	Comedy	
Nero and the Burning of Rome	Primo Zeglio	Gino Cervi, Paola Barbara, Yvonne Sanson	Historical	
Noi cannibali	Antonio Leonviola	Silvana Pampanini, Folco Lulli	Comedy	
Noi peccatori	Guido Brignone	Yvonne Sanson, Steve Barclay	Drama	
Non vogliamo morire	Oreste Palella, Ocen Tworkow	John Kitzmiller, Umberto Spadaro	Drama	

== P-Z ==
Title	Director	Cast	Genre	Notes
Il Paese dei campanelli	Jean Boyer	Sophia Loren, Alda Mangini	Musical comedy	
Il Peccato di Anna	Camillo Mastrocinque	Anna Vita, Ben Johnson	Drama	
One of Those	Aldo Fabrizi	Lea Padovani, Peppino De Filippo, Totò	Comedy drama	
Passionate Song	Giorgio Simonelli	Nilla Pizzi, Gérard Landry	Musical	
Passione				
Past Lovers	Adelchi Bianchi	Lia Amanda, Vittorio Sanipoli	Romance	
La pattuglia dell'Amba Alagi	Flavio Calzavara	Carla Calò, Dante Maggio	Drama	
Perdonami!	Mario Costa	Raf Vallone, Antonella Lualdi	Melodrama	
La Piccola fiammiferaia	Romano Scarpa		Sort film	
I Piombi di Venezia	Gian Maria Callegari	Armando Francioli, Giorgio Albertazzi	Historical	
Piovuto dal cielo				
Le Porte del Duomo di Milano				
Il Prezzo dell'onore	Ferdinando Baldi	Maria Frau, Mario Vitale, Vincenzo Musolino	Melodrama	
La Prigioniera di Amalfi				
Prima di sera	Piero Tellini	Gaby Andre, Gianni Cavalieri		
Prisoner in the Tower of Fire	Giorgio W. Chili	Elisa Cegani, Milly Vitale	Historical	
La Provinciale	Mario Soldati	Gina Lollobrigida, Gabriele Ferzetti		
Puccini	Carmine Gallone	Gabriele Ferzetti, Märta Torén, Nadia Gray	Historical	
Quand tu liras cette lettre	Jean-Pierre Melville	Robert Dalban, Yvonne de Bray	Drama	
The Return of Don Camillo	Julien Duvivier	Fernandel, Gino Cervi	Comedy	Co-production with France
Riscatto	Marino Girolami	Folco Lulli, Franca Marzi	Drama	
Rivalry	Giuliano Biagetti	Marco Vicario, Franca Marzi	Drama	
The Sack of Rome	Ferruccio Cerio	Pierre Cressoy, Hélène Remy	Historical	
Saluti e baci	Maurice Labro; Giorgio Simonelli	Georges Guetary, Luis Mariano	Musical	
Scampolo 53	Giorgio Bianchi	Maria Fiore, Henri Vidal	Drama	
I sette dell'Orsa maggiore	Duilio Coletti	Paul Cressoy, Tino Carraro	War	
The Ship of Condemned Women	Raffaello Matarazzo	Kerima, May Britt, Ettore Manni, Tania Weber	Historical	
Siamo ricchi e poveri			Romantic comedy	
Siamo tutti inquilini	Mario Mattoli	Aldo Fabrizi, Anna Maria Ferrero	Comedy	
Siamo tutti Milanesi	Mario Landi	Carlo Campanini, Liliana Bonfatti		
Il Sogno de Giovanni Bassain	Tomás Gutiérrez Alea		Short film	
Soli per le strade	Silvio Siano	Marco Vicario, Rita Livesi	Melodrama	
Spartaco	Riccardo Freda	Massimo Girotti, Ludmilla Tchérina	Historical	
The Steel Rope	Carlo Borghesio	Brigitte Fossey, Virna Lisi	Drama	
Storms	Guido Brignone	Jean Gabin, Silvana Pampanini, Carla Del Poggio	Drama	Co-production with France
Sua altezza ha detto no!	Mario Basaglia	Luigi Pavese, Elena Giusti	Musical comedy	
La Sultana Safiyè			Adventure	
Tam tam nell'oltre Giuba			Adventure	
Tarantella napoletana	Camillo Mastrocinque	Clara Bindi, Clara Crispo	Musical comedy	
Terminal Station	Vittorio De Sica	Jennifer Jones, Montgomery Clift		Italian neorealism produced by David O. Selznick. The Italian version is longer than the American cut.
Terra straniera	Sergio Corbucci	John Kitzmiller, Mario Vitale	Drama	
Thérèse Raquin	Marcel Carné	Simone Signoret, Raf Vallone	Drama	Co-production with France
Too Young for Love	Lionello De Felice	Aldo Fabrizi, Marina Vlady	Comedy drama	Co-production with France
Tormento d'anime				
Torna!	Raffaello Matarazzo	Amedeo Nazzari, Yvonne Sanson	Melodrama	
Traviata '53	Vittorio Cottafavi	Barbara Laage, Armando Francioli	Drama	
The Treasure of Bengal	Gianni Vernuccio	Sabu, Luisella Boni	Adventure	Co-production with France
Two Nights with Cleopatra	Mario Mattoli	Sophia Loren, Alberto Sordi	Historical comedy	
The Unfaithfuls	Mario Monicelli, Steno	Gina Lollobrigida, May Britt	Comedy	
Gli uomini, che mascalzoni!	Glauco Pellegrini	Antonella Lualdi, Walter Chiari	Comedy	
La Valigia dei sogni	Luigi Comencini	Umberto Melnati, Maria Pia Casilia	Comedy	
Vestire gli ignudi	Marcello Pagliero	Gabriele Ferzetti, Eleonora Rossi Drago	Drama	
La Via del sud				
Viaggio in oriente				
Il Viale della speranza	Dino Risi	Silvio Bagolini, Nerio Bernardi	Drama	
I Vinti	Michelangelo Antonioni	Franco Interlenghi, Anna Maria Ferrero	Drama	Co-production with France
I vitelloni	Federico Fellini	Franco Interlenghi, Alberto Sordi, Franco Fabrizi, Leopoldo Trieste, Riccardo Fellini	Drama	3 Nastro d'Argento. Venice Award. Academy Award nominee best script
Viva la rivista!	Enzo Trapani	Piero Lulli, Gisella Sofio	Musical	
Voice of Silence	G.W. Pabst	Aldo Fabrizi, Cosetta Greco		Co-production with France and UK
Vortice	Raffaello Matarazzo	Massimo Girotti, Silvana Pampanini	Drama	
Voto di marinaio	Ernesto de Rosa	Roberto Bruni, Ugo D'Alessio	Drama	
The Wages of Fear	Henri-Georges Clouzot	Yves Montand, Charles Vanel	Thriller	Co-production with France
The Walk	Renato Rascel	Renato Rascel, Valentina Cortese	Comedy drama	
The Wayward Wife	Mario Soldati	Gina Lollobrigida, Franco Interlenghi, Gabriele Ferzetti	Drama	Entered into the 1953 Cannes Film Festival
We, the Women	Luchino Visconti, Roberto Rossellini, Gianni Franciolini, Luigi Zampa, Alfredo Guarini	Ingrid Bergman, Anna Magnani, Isa Miranda, Alida Valli		Film with 5 episodes. One episode is about a casting in Cinecittà
What Scoundrels Men Are!	Glauco Pellegrini	Walter Chiari, Antonella Lualdi	Comedy	
When You Read This Letter	Jean-Pierre Melville	Philippe Lemaire, Juliette Gréco, Yvonne Sanson	Drama	Co-production with France
Woman of the Red Sea	Giovanni Roccardi	Sophia Loren, Steve Barclay, Umberto Melnati	Comedy	
The World Condemns Them	Gianni Franciolini	Alida Valli, Amedeo Nazzari	Drama	Co-production with France

== Documentaries ==
Title	Director	Cast	Genre	Notes
Dieci anni della nostra vita	Romolo Marcellini		Documentary	
La Diga sul ghiaccio	Ermanno Olmi		Documentary, short film	
Gli Eroi dell'Artide	Luciano Emmer		Documentary	
Festa dei morti in Sicilia	Francesco Maselli		Documentary	
Green Magic	Gian Gaspare Napolitano		Documentary	Entered into the Cannes and Berlin film festivals
Piccole case di grandi uomini	Lino Lionello Ghirardini		Documentary	
Uno Spettacolo di pupi	Francesco Maselli		Documentary	
