= List of British films of 1953 =

British films released in 1953

A list of films produced in the United Kingdom in 1953 (see 1953 in film):

== 1953 ==
Title	Director	Cast	Genre	Notes
1953
36 Hours	Montgomery Tully	Dan Duryea, Elsie Albiin, Eric Pohlmann	Crime	
Albert R.N.	Lewis Gilbert	Anthony Steel, Jack Warner, Robert Beatty	War	
Alf's Baby	Maclean Rogers	Jerry Desmonde, Pauline Stroud, Sandra Dorne	Comedy	
Always a Bride	Ralph Smart	Peggy Cummins, Terence Morgan, Ronald Squire	Comedy	
Appointment in London	Philip Leacock	Dirk Bogarde, Ian Hunter, Dinah Sheridan	War	
Background	Daniel Birt	Valerie Hobson, Philip Friend, Norman Woodland	Drama	
Beat the Devil	John Huston	Humphrey Bogart, Jennifer Jones, Gina Lollobrigida	Comedy thriller	Co-production with Italy
The Beggar's Opera	Peter Brook	Laurence Olivier, Dorothy Tutin, Hugh Griffith	Musical	
Behind the Headlines	Maclean Rogers	Gilbert Harding, Vi Kaley, Jack May	Crime	
Black 13	Ken Hughes	Peter Reynolds, Rona Anderson, Lana Morris	Crime	
Black Orchid	Charles Saunders	Ronald Howard, Olga Edwardes, John Bentley	Crime	
Blood Orange	Terence Fisher	Tom Conway, Mila Parély, Naomi Chance	Crime	
The Blue Parrot	John Harlow	Dermot Walsh, Jacqueline Hill, Ballard Berkeley	Crime	
The Broken Horseshoe	Martyn C. Webster	Robert Beatty, Elizabeth Sellars, Peter Coke	Crime	
The Captain's Paradise	Anthony Kimmins	Alec Guinness, Celia Johnson, Yvonne De Carlo	Romantic comedy	
Cosh Boy	Lewis Gilbert	Joan Collins, Betty Ann Davies, Hermione Baddeley	Crime drama	
Counterspy	Vernon Sewell	Dermot Walsh, Hazel Court, Hermione Baddeley	Thriller	
The Cruel Sea	Charles Frend	Jack Hawkins, Donald Sinden, Virginia McKenna	War	
A Day to Remember	Ralph Thomas	Stanley Holloway, Donald Sinden, Odile Versois	Comedy drama	
Deadly Nightshade	John Gilling	Emrys Jones, Zena Marshall, John Horsley	Crime	
Death Goes to School	Stephen Clarkson	Barbara Murray, Gordon Jackson, Beatrice Varley	Mystery	
Decameron Nights	Hugo Fregonese	Joan Fontaine, Louis Jourdan, Joan Collins	Drama	
Desperate Moment	Compton Bennett	Dirk Bogarde, Mai Zetterling, Albert Lieven	Thriller	
The Dog and the Diamonds	Ralph Thomas	Kathleen Harrison, George Coulouris, Geoffrey Sumner	Family	
Escape by Night	John Gilling	Sid James, Bonar Colleano, Simone Silva	Crime	
The Fake	Godfrey Grayson	Dennis O'Keefe, Coleen Gray, Hugh Williams	Crime	
The Final Test	Anthony Asquith	Jack Warner, Robert Morley, Adrianne Allen	Sports	
The Flanagan Boy	Reginald LeBorg	Barbara Payton, Frederick Valk, Tony Wright	Drama	
Flannelfoot	Maclean Rogers	Ronald Howard, Mary Germaine, Jack Watling	Crime	
Forces' Sweetheart	Maclean Rogers	Hy Hazell, Harry Secombe, Freddie Frinton	Comedy	
Four Sided Triangle	Terence Fisher	Barbara Payton, Stephen Murray, James Hayter	Sci-fi	
The Gambler and the Lady	Patrick Jenkins	Dane Clark, Kathleen Byron, Naomi Chance	Crime	
Genevieve	Henry Cornelius	Dinah Sheridan, John Gregson, Kay Kendall	Comedy	Number 86 in the list of BFI Top 100 British films
The Girl on the Pier	Lance Comfort	Veronica Hurst, Ron Randell, Charles Victor	Crime	
Glad Tidings	Wolf Rilla	Barbara Kelly, Raymond Huntley, Ronald Howard	Comedy drama	
The Good Beginning	Gilbert Gunn	John Fraser, Eileen Moore, Peter Reynolds	Drama	
Grand National Night	Bob McNaught	Nigel Patrick, Moira Lister, Beatrice Campbell	Thriller	
The Great Game	Maurice Elvey	James Hayter, Thora Hird, Diana Dors	Sports	
The Heart of the Matter	George More O'Ferrall	Trevor Howard, Elizabeth Allan, Maria Schell	Drama	
The House of the Arrow	Michael Anderson	Oskar Homolka, Yvonne Furneaux, Robert Urquhart	Mystery	
House of Blackmail	Maurice Elvey	Mary Germaine, William Sylvester, Alexander Gauge	Drama	
Innocents in Paris	Gordon Parry	Alastair Sim, Jimmy Edwards, Claire Bloom	Comedy	
Intimate Relations	Charles Frank	Harold Warrender, William Russell, Elsie Albiin	Drama	Entered into the 1953 Cannes Film Festival
The Intruder	Guy Hamilton	Jack Hawkins, Michael Medwin, George Cole	Drama	
Is Your Honeymoon Really Necessary?	Maurice Elvey	Diana Dors, Bonar Colleano, David Tomlinson	Comedy	
Isn't Life Wonderful!	Harold French	Cecil Parker, Eileen Herlie, Donald Wolfit	Comedy	
It's a Grand Life	John E. Blakeley	Frank Randle, Diana Dors, Jennifer Jayne	Comedy	
Johnny on the Run	Lewis Gilbert	Sydney Tafler, Michael Balfour, Jean Anderson	Drama	
The Kidnappers	Philip Leacock	Duncan Macrae, Theodore Bikel, Adrienne Corri	Drama	
The Large Rope	Wolf Rilla	Donald Houston, Susan Shaw, Vanda Godsell	Crime	
Laughing Anne	Herbert Wilcox	Wendell Corey, Margaret Lockwood, Forrest Tucker	Adventure	
Laxdale Hall	John Eldridge	Kathleen Ryan, Raymond Huntley, Ronald Squire	Comedy	
The Limping Man	Cy Endfield	Lloyd Bridges, Moira Lister, Alan Wheatley	Thriller	
The Long Memory	Robert Hamer	John Mills, John McCallum, Elizabeth Sellars	Drama	
Love in Pawn	Charles Saunders	Bernard Braden, Barbara Kelly, Jeannie Carson	Comedy	
Malta Story	Brian Desmond Hurst	Alec Guinness, Jack Hawkins, Muriel Pavlow	War	
The Man Between	Carol Reed	James Mason, Claire Bloom, Hildegard Knef	Thriller	
The Man from Cairo	Ray Enright	George Raft, Gianna Maria Canale, Irene Papas	Crime	Co-production with Italy
Mantrap	Terence Fisher	Paul Henreid, Lois Maxwell, Kieron Moore	Crime	
Marilyn	Wolf Rilla	Sandra Dorne, Maxwell Reed, Leslie Dwyer	Crime	
The Master of Ballantrae	William Keighley	Errol Flynn, Anthony Steel, Beatrice Campbell	Adventure	
Meet Mr Lucifer	Anthony Pelissier	Stanley Holloway, Peggy Cummins, Barbara Murray	Comedy	
Melba	Lewis Milestone	Patrice Munsel, Robert Morley, John McCallum	Biopic	
Murder at 3am	Francis Searle	Dennis Price, Peggy Evans, Arnold Bell	Crime	
Murder at Scotland Yard	Victor M. Gover	Tod Slaughter, Patrick Barr, Tucker McGuire	Thriller	
The Net	Anthony Asquith	James Donald, Phyllis Calvert, Herbert Lom	Thriller	
Never Let Me Go	Delmer Daves	Clark Gable, Gene Tierney, Bernard Miles	Adventure	
Noose for a Lady	Wolf Rilla	Dennis Price, Rona Anderson, Ronald Howard	Crime	
Operation Diplomat	John Guillermin	Guy Rolfe, Lisa Daniely, Patricia Dainton	Drama	
The Oracle	C. M. Pennington-Richards	Robert Beatty, Michael Medwin, Virginia McKenna	Comedy	
Our Girl Friday	Noel Langley	Joan Collins, Kenneth More George Cole	Comedy	
Park Plaza 605	Bernard Knowles	Tom Conway, Eva Bartok, Joy Shelton	Crime	
Personal Affair	Anthony Pelissier	Gene Tierney, Leo Genn, Glynis Johns	Drama	
Recoil	John Gilling	Kieron Moore, Elizabeth Sellars, Edward Underdown	Crime	
The Red Beret	Terence Young	Alan Ladd, Leo Genn, Susan Stephen	War	
Rob Roy: The Highland Rogue	Harold French	Richard Todd, Glynis Johns, James Robertson Justice	Historical adventure	
Rough Shoot	Robert Parrish	Joel McCrea, Evelyn Keyes, Herbert Lom	Thriller	
Sailor of the King	Roy Boulting	Jeffrey Hunter, Michael Rennie, Wendy Hiller	War	
The Saint's Return	Seymour Friedman	Louis Hayward, Naomi Chance, Sydney Tafler	Thriller	
Sea Devils	Raoul Walsh	Yvonne De Carlo, Rock Hudson, Maxwell Reed	Adventure	Co-production with the United States
Small Town Story	Montgomery Tully	Donald Houston, Susan Shaw, Alan Wheatley	Thriller	
South of Algiers	Jack Lee	Van Heflin, Eric Portman, Wanda Hendrix	Adventure	
Spaceways	Terence Fisher	Howard Duff, Eva Bartok, Alan Wheatley	Sci-fi	
The Square Ring	Basil Dearden	Sid James, Jack Warner, Joan Collins	Drama	
The Steel Key	Robert S. Baker	Terence Morgan, Joan Rice, Raymond Lovell	Thriller	
The Story of Gilbert and Sullivan	Sidney Gilliat	Robert Morley, Maurice Evans, Eileen Herlie	Musical	
Strange Stories	Don Chaffey, John Guillermin	Peter Bull, Naomi Chance, Valentine Dyall	Drama	
The Straw Man	Donald Taylor	Dermot Walsh, Lana Morris, Clifford Evans	Crime	
Street Corner	Muriel Box	Peggy Cummins, Terence Morgan, Anne Crawford	Drama	
Street of Shadows	Richard Vernon	Cesar Romero, Kay Kendall, Simone Silva	Crime	
Stryker of the Yard	Arthur Crabtree	Clifford Evans, Susan Stephen, Jack Watling	Crime	
The Sword and the Rose	Ken Annakin	Glynis Johns, Richard Todd, James Robertson Justice	Adventure	Co-production with the United States
Take a Powder	Lionel Tomlinson	Julian Vedey, Max Bacon, Maudie Edwards	Comedy	
There Was a Young Lady	Lawrence Huntington	Michael Denison, Dulcie Gray, Sydney Tafler	Comedy	
Those People Next Door	John Harlow	Jack Warner, Charles Victor, Garry Marsh	Comedy	
Three Steps in the Dark	Daniel Birt	Greta Gynt, Hugh Sinclair, Sarah Lawson	Crime	
Three Steps to the Gallows	John Gilling	Scott Brady, Mary Castle, Gabrielle Brune	Crime	
Time Bomb	Ted Tetzlaff	Glenn Ford, Anne Vernon, Maurice Denham	Thriller	
The Titfield Thunderbolt	Charles Crichton	Stanley Holloway, Naunton Wayne, John Gregson	Comedy	
Top of the Form	John Paddy Carstairs	Ronald Shiner, Harry Fowler, Jacqueline Pierreux	Comedy	
Trouble in Store	John Paddy Carstairs	Norman Wisdom, Moira Lister, Lana Morris	Comedy	
Turn the Key Softly	Jack Lee	Yvonne Mitchell, Joan Collins, Kathleen Harrison	Drama	
Twice Upon a Time	Emeric Pressburger	Hugh Williams, Elizabeth Allan, Jack Hawkins	Comedy	
Valley of Song	Gilbert Gunn	Mervyn Johns, Clifford Evans, Maureen Swanson	Comedy	
The Wedding of Lilli Marlene	Arthur Crabtree	Lisa Daniely, Hugh McDermott, Sid James	Drama	
Wheel of Fate	Francis Searle	Patric Doonan, Sandra Dorne, Bryan Forbes	Drama	
Will Any Gentleman...?	Michael Anderson	George Cole, Veronica Hurst, Heather Thatcher	Comedy	
The Yellow Balloon	J. Lee Thompson	Andrew Ray, Kathleen Ryan, Kenneth More	Drama	

== Documentaries ==
Title	Director	Cast	Genre	Notes
The Conquest of Everest	George Lowe	Meredith Edwards (narrator)	Documentary	
Man of Africa	Cyril Frankel	Frederick Bijuerenda, Gordon Heath		Entered into the 1954 Cannes Film Festival
O Dreamland	Lindsay Anderson		Documentary short subject	
A Queen Is Crowned		Narrated by Laurence Olivier	Documentary	

== See also ==
- 1953 in British music
- 1953 in British television
- 1953 in the United Kingdom
