= Katutu, the Blind =

1953 film

- Directed by: Piet Verstegen
- Screenplay by: Piet Verstegen
- Produced by: Africa-Films
- Cinematography: Roger de Vloo
- Release date: 1953
- Running time: 75 minutes
- Country: Belgium

Katutu, the Blind is a 1953 film.

== Synopsis ==
A young African girl devoted to the inhabitants of her village is seriously injured and taken to the white man's hospital. As she lies on her deathbed, she insists on seeing Katutu, an elderly blind man and a professed pagan. She then states her last wishes; she wants Katutu to convert to Catholicism.
