= 1953 in the United Kingdom =

Events from the year 1953 in the United Kingdom. This is the year of the coronation of Queen Elizabeth II and the North Sea flood.

== Incumbents ==
- Monarch – Elizabeth II
- Prime Minister – Winston Churchill (Conservative)

== Events ==
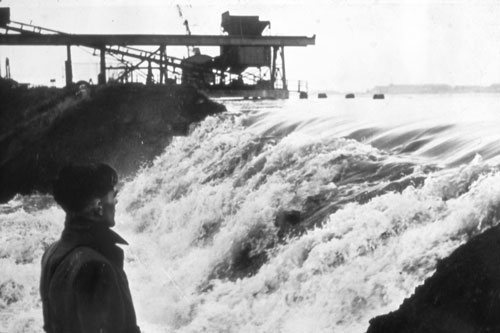
A breach at Erith after the North Sea flood

- 28 January – Nineteen-year old Derek Bentley is hanged at Wandsworth Prison in London for his part in the murder of PC Sidney Miles.
- 31 January – Car ferry MV Princess Victoria, sailing from Stranraer, Scotland, to Larne, Northern Ireland, sinks in the Irish Sea killing 133 people on board. Among the dead are: Northern Ireland Finance Minister and Deputy Prime Minister Major Maynard Sinclair, and Sir Walter Smiles, the Ulster Unionist MP for North Down.
- 31 January–1 February – The North Sea flood of 1953 kills 307 people on the east coast of Britain, with more at sea. A corvette and a submarine sink at their moorings in HM Dockyard Sheerness.
- 1 February – Pool petrol, introduced during World War II, is replaced by individual brands.
- 3 February – Contralto Kathleen Ferrier premieres a critically acclaimed production of Gluck's Orfeo at the Royal Opera House, Covent Garden, but a repeat 3 days later will be her last public performance as terminal cancer (not made public) cuts her career short at age 40.
- 5 February – Rationing of sweets, introduced during World War II, ends.
- 23 February – Coronation amnesty for wartime deserters from the forces announced by the Prime Minister.

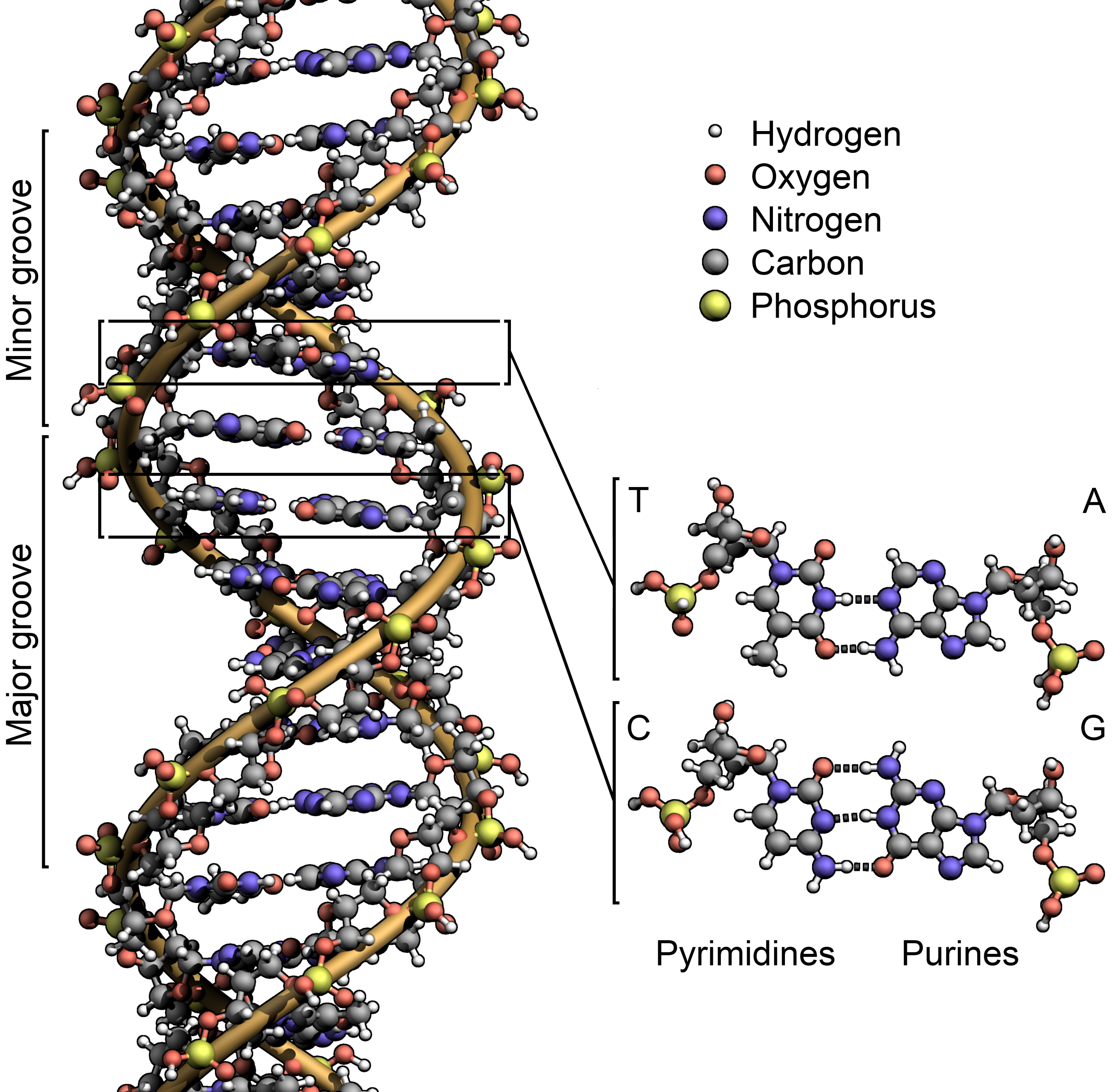
DNA double helix

- 28 February – James D. Watson and Francis Crick announce that they have discovered the structure of the DNA molecule.
- 4 March – Tommy Taylor, 21-year-old centre forward, becomes Britain's most expensive footballer in a £29,999 transfer from Barnsley to Manchester United.
- 16 March – Josip Tito, the leader of Yugoslavia visits the UK, the first Communist leader to do so.
- 24 March
  - Queen Mary, consort of the late King George V, dies in her sleep at Marlborough House in London.
  - The 10 Rillington Place murders are uncovered in London.
- 31 March – The funeral of Queen Mary takes place at St George's Chapel, Windsor Castle.
- 1 April – First record by any UK act to reach number one in the UK Singles Chart, The Stargazers' recording of "Broken Wings".
- 13 April – Ian Fleming publishes his first James Bond novel, Casino Royale.
- 15 April – Britain awards the George Medal to 22-year-old American airman Reis Leming who rescued 27 people in last winter's floods in East Anglia.
- 16 April – The Queen launches the Royal Yacht Britannia at John Brown & Company shipbuilders on the Clyde.
- 18 April – Liverpudlian singer Lita Roza becomes the first British female artist to reach No. 1 in the UK singles chart, with her recording of "(How Much Is) That Doggie in the Window?".
- 24 April – Prime Minister Winston Churchill receives a knighthood from the Queen.
- 25 April – Francis Crick and James D. Watson publish their description of the double helix structure of DNA in the paper "Molecular structure of Nucleic Acids".
- 2 May – Blackpool F.C. win the FA Cup final with a 4–3 victory over Bolton Wanderers, who have been 3–1 ahead until the final quarter of the game. Stan Mortensen scores a hat-trick, but the 38-year-old winger Stanley Matthews is instrumental in winning the game for Blackpool, who have never won a major trophy before.
- 25 May – Whitsun bank holiday; many businesses postpone the holiday for a week.

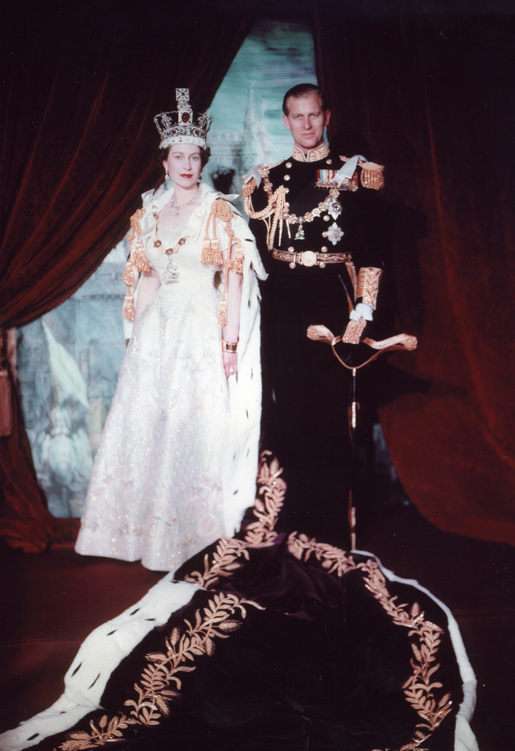
Coronation portrait of Elizabeth II and The Duke of Edinburgh, June

- 2 June
  - The coronation of Queen Elizabeth II takes place at Westminster Abbey, celebrated as a public holiday.
  - The Times exclusively carries James Morris's scoop of the conquest of Mount Everest by a British expedition on 29 May.
- 6 June
  - The Prevention of Crime Act comes into effect, making the carrying of an offensive weapon in a public place a criminal offence.
  - The Epsom Derby is won by Pinza, the only Derby victory for Gordon Richards at his 28th attempt, days after becoming the only jockey to be made a knight. The Queen's horse, Aureole, finishes second.
- 23 June – Prime Minister Winston Churchill, 78, suffers a stroke at a dinner for the Italian Prime Minister Alcide De Gasperi. On 27 June the public are told that he is suffering from fatigue.
- 25 June – John Christie, a 54-year-old Londoner, is sentenced to death for the murder of his wife Ethel Christie. A total of eight bodies have been found at Christie's home, 10 Rillington Place in Notting Hill, including those of the wife and daughter of Timothy Evans who had been hanged in 1950 for his daughter's murder.
- 26 June – Eskdalemuir enters the UK Weather Records for the highest rainfall in a 30-minute period with 80mm, a record that will remain for at least sixty years.
- 30 June – First roll-on/roll-off ferry crossing of the English Channel, Dover–Boulogne.
- 15 July – John Christie is hanged at Pentonville Prison, where a crowd of some two hundred people stand to wait for the notice of execution to be posted.
- 18 July – The Quatermass Experiment, first of the Quatermass science-fiction serials by Nigel Kneale, begins its run on BBC Television.
- 20 July – The Good Old Days, filmed at the Leeds City Varieties, begins its 30-year run on BBC Television.
- 19 August
  - The England cricket team under Len Hutton defeat Australia to win The Ashes for the first time in nineteen years.
  - Iranian coup d'état ("Operation Boot"): Overthrow of the democratically elected Prime Minister of Iran by Iranian military in favour of strengthening the rule of Shah Mohammad Reza Pahlavi with the support of the United States and UK.
- Autumn – Myxomatosis reaches the UK, first being illegally introduced onto an estate in West Sussex.
- 19 September – Sir Hubert Parry's 1916 setting of William Blake's "Jerusalem" first appears as a permanent feature of the Last Night of the Proms (televised).
- 26 September – End of post-war sugar rationing.
- 6 October – The government sends troops to the colony of British Guiana, blaming Communists for causing unrest.
- 10 October – RAF officers Monty Burton with Don Gannon win the speed section of the 1953 London to Christchurch air race in an English Electric Canberra, with under 23 hours flying time.
- 27 October – Arbroath life-boat Robert Lindsay capsizes on service: six crew killed.
- November – The first production Blue Danube atomic bomb, the first British-developed and -built nuclear weapon, is delivered to the Bomber Command stockpile at RAF Wittering, concluding the High Explosive Research project to develop it.
- 2 November – The Samaritans telephone counselling service for the suicidal is started by Rev. Chad Varah in London.
- 11 November – Current affairs series Panorama first airs on BBC Television, it will still be running more than seventy years later.
- 17 November – Italian cargo steamer Vittoria Claudia sinks after collision with French motor vessel Perou in the English Channel, killing twenty Italian sailors.
- 20 November – The Piltdown Man skull, which was discovered in 1912 and thought to be the fossilised remains of a hitherto unknown form of early human, is exposed as a hoax.
- 25 November – Match of the Century: England v Hungary football match at Wembley Stadium results in a 6–3 defeat suffered by the England national football team against Hungary, ending a 90-year unbeaten home run against sides from outside the British Isles.
- 26 November – The House of Lords votes in favour of the government's proposals for commercial television.
- 30 November – Kabaka crisis: Edward Mutesa II, the kabaka (king) of Buganda, is deposed and exiled to London by Sir Andrew Benjamin Cohen, Governor of Uganda.
- c. December – Matchbox toy vehicles are introduced by Lesney Products of London.
- 10 December
  - Winston Churchill wins the Nobel Prize in Literature "for his mastery of historical and biographical description as well as for brilliant oratory in defending exalted human values".
  - Hans Adolf Krebs wins the Nobel Prize in Physiology or Medicine "for his discovery of the citric acid cycle".
  - Pilkington Brothers take out their first patent for the float glass process developed by Alastair Pilkington.

=== Undated ===
- Women teachers are granted equal pay with men.
- Michael Ventris deciphers the Minoan script Linear B.
- First Italian espresso coffee bar opens in the UK, The Moka in Frith Street, Soho, London.
- Jazz musician John Dankworth sets up his big band, the Johnny Dankworth Orchestra.
- Laura Ashley sells her first printed fabrics.
- J. C. Bamford of Rocester introduce the backhoe loader.
- E. Gomme introduce the popular G-Plan furniture range.
- House of Fraser take over the Sunderland-based Binns group of department stores.
- Some 25% of British households now own a television set, seventeen years after the first sets became available. Many families buy a set this year to watch the Coronation of Elizabeth II.
- Artist L. S. Lowry paints his football match picture Going to the Match and exhibits it at the Lefevre Gallery.

== Publications ==
- Agatha Christie's novels After the Funeral (Hercule Poirot) and A Pocket Full of Rye (Miss Marple).
- Gerald Durrell's first book, The Overloaded Ark.
- Lawrence Durrell's book Reflections on a Marine Venus.
- Islwyn Ffowc Elis's Welsh novel Cysgod y Cryman
- Ian Fleming's first James Bond novel, Casino Royale.
- L. P. Hartley's novel The Go-Between.
- C. S. Lewis' novel The Silver Chair.
- Evelyn Waugh's novel Love Among the Ruins. A Romance of the Near Future.
- Geoffrey Willans and Ronald Searle's Molesworth book Down With Skool.
- John Wyndham's novel The Kraken Wakes.

== Births ==
- 1 January – Maureen Beattie, Irish-born Scottish actress
- 4 January
  - Jackie Ballard, journalist and politician
  - Richard Boden, director and producer
  - Vicki Bruce, psychologist and academic
- 6 January – Malcolm Young, Scottish-born Australian guitarist (died 2017)
- 11 January – John Sessions, actor (died 2020)
- 19 January – Linda Hayden, actress
- 20 January – John Robertson, footballer (died 2025)
- 29 January
  - Ronnie Moore, footballer and manager
  - Richard Younger-Ross, politician
- 17 February – Norman Pace, actor and comedian
- 18 February – Ian Jenkins, archaeologist and curator (died 2020)
- 22 February – Geoffrey Perkins, comedy producer, writer and performer (died 2008)
- 27 February – Gavin Esler, journalist and television presenter
- 3 March – Robyn Hitchcock, alternative rock singer-songwriter
- 19 March – Ian Blair, police officer (died 2025)
- 26 March – Christopher Fowler, thriller writer (died 2023)
- 4 April – Sammy Wilson, Northern Irish politician
- 9 April
  - Howard Bernstein, civil servant (died 2024)
  - John Howard, glam-pop singer-songwriter
- 11 April – Andrew Wiles, mathematician known for proving Fermat's Last Theorem
- 13 April – Stephen Byers, politician
- 18 April – Steven Pimlott, theatre director (died 2007)
- 20 April – Sebastian Faulks, novelist
- 24 April – Tim Woodward, screen actor (died 2023)
- 26 April – David Reddaway, Canadian-English diplomat, British High Commissioner to Canada
- 6 May
  - Tony Blair, Prime Minister (1997–2007)
  - Graeme Souness, Scottish footballer and manager
- 7 May – Ian McKay, soldier, recipient of VC posthumously (killed 1982)
- 10 May – John Diamond, journalist (died 2001)
- 15 May
  - Athene Donald, physicist
  - Mike Oldfield, musician
- 19 May – Victoria Wood, comic performer (died 2016)
- 21 May – Jim Devine, politician
- 24 May – Alfred Molina, actor
- 26 May – Michael Portillo, politician
- 31 May – Linda Riordan, politician
- 2 June – Dave Boy Green, boxer and businessman
- 3 June – John Moulder-Brown, actor
- 7 June – Johnny Clegg, mbaqanga and Afro-pop musician and musical anthropologist (died 2019)
- 8 June – Billy Hayes, trade union leader
- 18 June – Peter Donohoe, pianist
- 19 June – Hilary Jones, physician, television host and media personality
- 23 June – John Stahl, Scottish actor (died 2022)
- 26 June – Neil Record, businessman, author and economist
- 1 July – Alan Sunderland, footballer
- 4 July – Francis Maude, politician
- 7 July – Robert McCrum, writer and editor
- 15 July – John Denham, politician
- 21 July – David Ervine, leader of the Progressive Unionist Party (died 2007)
- 24 July – Julian Brazier, politician
- 29 July – Willie Donald, Scottish cricket player and administrator (died 2022)
- 2 August – Anthony Seldon, educator and historian
- 8 August – Nigel Mansell, racing driver
- 9 August – Roberta Tovey, actress
- 15 August – Carol Thatcher, journalist, and Mark Thatcher, businessman
- 16 August – David Spiegelhalter, statistician
- 18 August – Patrick Cowdell, English boxer
- 23 August – Bobby G (Robert Gubby), singer (Bucks Fizz)
- 2 September
  - Keith Allen, actor
  - Patsy Rodenburg, voice coach
- 12 September – Fiona Mactaggart, educator and politician
- 23 September – Nicholas Witchell, broadcaster and journalist
- 27 September – Diane Abbott, politician
- 10 October – Janet Bloomfield, disarmament campaigner (died 2007)
- 12 October – Les Dennis, television presenter, actor and comedian
- 13 October – John Simpson, lexicographer and scholar
- 16 October – Brinsley Forde, actor and reggae musician
- 21 October – Peter Mandelson, politician
- 24 October
  - John Barton, English footballer and manager
  - Andrew Turner, academic and politician
  - David Wright, composer and music producer
- 26 October – Roger Allam, actor
- 27 October
  - Paul Alcock, football referee (died 2018)
  - Peter Firth, actor
- 28 October – Phil Dwyer, Welsh footballer (died 2021)
- 3 November – Claire van Kampen, English theatre director (died 2025)
- 4 November – Peter Lord, British film producer and director
- 7 November – Lucinda Green, equestrian
- 11 November – Andy Partridge, rock singer-songwriter
- 13 November – Andrew Ranken, drummer (died 2026)
- 16 November – Griff Rhys Jones, comedian, actor and writer
- 18 November
  - Alan Moore, writer and magician
  - Alan Murphy, guitarist (died 1989)
- 21 November – Tina Brown, journalist and editor
- 26 November – Hilary Benn, politician
- 28 November – Alistair Darling, politician, Chancellor of the Exchequer (died 2023)
- 29 November – Rose West, serial killer
- 2 December – David Anderson, English miner and politician
- 6 December – Geoff Hoon, politician
- 13 December – Jim Davidson, comedian

== Deaths ==
- 13 January – Sir Edward Marsh, polymath and civil servant (born 1872)
- 28 January – Derek Bentley, criminal (born 1933) (hanged)
- 29 January
  - Sir Norman MacEwen, RAF commander (born 1881)
  - Sir Reginald Wingate, general and colonial administrator (born 1861)
- 1 February – William Sydney Marchant, colonial official (born 1894)
- 9 February – Cecil Hepworth, film director (born 1874)
- 23 February – Sir Cecil Hunter-Rodwell, colonial administrator (born 1874)
- 24 March – Queen Mary, consort of King George V, grandmother of Queen Elizabeth II (born 1867)
- 6 April – Idris Davies, Welsh poet (born 1905) (cancer)
- 9 April – C. E. M. Joad, philosopher and broadcaster (born 1891) (cancer)
- 3 May – John Erskine, Lord Erskine, soldier and politician (born 1895)
- 15 May – Mabel Love, dancer and actress (born 1874)
- 25 May – Edmund Dulac, French-born illustrator and designer (Wilding series) (born 1882)
- 1 June – Alex James, Scottish footballer (born 1901) (cancer)
- 16 June – Margaret Bondfield, politician and trade unionist (born 1873)
- 9 July – Annie Kenney, suffragette (born 1879)
- 15 July – John Christie, serial killer (born 1899) (hanged)
- 16 July – Hilaire Belloc, writer (born 1870)
- 18 July – Lucy Booth, Salvationist, fifth daughter of William and Catherine Booth (born 1868)
- 29 July – Rosa May Billinghurst, suffragette (born 1875)
- 30 September
  - Robert Mawdesley, stage and radio actor (born c. 1900)
  - Lewis Fry Richardson, mathematical physicist (born 1881)
- 3 October – Sir Arnold Bax, composer (born 1883)
- 8 October
  - Nigel Bruce, character actor (born 1895)
  - Kathleen Ferrier, contralto (born 1912) (cancer)
- 14 October – Arthur Wimperis, illustrator and playwright (born 1874)
- 20 October – Sir Robert Brooke-Popham, air chief marshal (born 1878)
- 21 October – Sir Muirhead Bone, etcher (born 1876)
- 27 October – Thomas Wass, cricketer (born 1873)
- 9 November – Dylan Thomas, Welsh poet and author (born 1914) (pneumonia)
- 27 November – T. F. Powys, novelist (born 1875)
- 29 November – Ernest Barnes, mathematician, scientist, theologian and Bishop of Birmingham (born 1874)
- 25 December – William Haselden, cartoonist (born 1872)

== See also ==
- 1953 in British music
- 1953 in British television
- List of British films of 1953
