= 1953 in British television =

This is a list of British television related events from 1953.

== Events ==
=== March ===
- 17 March
  - Patrick Troughton becomes television's first Robin Hood, playing the eponymous folk hero in the first of six half-hour episodes of Robin Hood, shown weekly until 21 April on the BBC Television Service.
  - The BBC shows a 30-minute programme of the final of the World Snooker Championship.

=== May ===
- 1 May – The BBC brings into service television transmitters at Pontop Pike (County Durham) and Glencairn (Belfast) to improve coverage prior to the Coronation broadcast.
- 31 May – This week's special 'Coronation Number' of the BBC's Radio Times sells a record 9,012,358 copies.

=== June ===
- 2 June – The Coronation of Queen Elizabeth II is televised in the UK on the BBC Television Service. Sales of TV sets rise sharply in the weeks leading up to the event. It is also one of the earliest broadcasts to be deliberately recorded for posterity and continues to exist in its entirety.

=== July ===
- 18 July – The Quatermass Experiment, first of the famous Quatermass science-fiction serials by Nigel Kneale, begins its run on the BBC.
- 20 July – The Good Old Days begins on the BBC Television Service.

=== October ===
- 2 October – A photograph of a wanted person issued by the police is shown on British television for the first time, that of William Pettit, wanted in connection with the murder of a married woman at Chislehurst a fortnight earlier, shown on the BBC with a Scotland Yard appeal voiced by John Snagge. Pettit's body is found in the City of London 3 weeks later.

=== November ===
- 11 November – The current affairs series Panorama launches on the BBC Television Service. Continuing into its 70th year, it becomes the longest-running programme in British television history and the world's longest-running television news magazine programme.
- 26 November – The House of Lords backs Government plans for the introduction of commercial television in the UK.

=== December ===
- 2 December – The BBC broadcasts its 'Television Symbol' for the first time, the first animated television presentation symbol in the world. Known as the 'bat's wings' by logo enthusiasts, it will remain until 1960.
- 31 December – The BBC begins a long series of New Year's Eve broadcasts from Scotland with Hogmanay Party.
- Peter Scott presents the first BBC television natural history broadcast, from his home at Slimbridge.

=== Date unknown ===
- Probable year – The BBC Film Unit's fast motion short London to Brighton in Four Minutes is first screened, on BBC Television's Children's Newsreel.

== Debuts ==
- 17 January – Face the Music (1953–1955)
- 8 February – Our Marie (1953)
- 10 February – Worzel Gummidge Turns Detective (1953)
- 11 March – The Pattern of Marriage (1953)
- 14 March – Epitaph for a Spy (1953)
- 17 March – Robin Hood (1953)
- April – Watch with Mother (1953–1975)
- 25 April – Strictly Personal (1953)
- 28 April – Seven Little Australians (1953)
- 6 May – Reggie Little at Large (1953)
- 4 July – The Great Detective (1953)
- 14 July – The Treasure Seekers (1953)
- 18 July – The Quatermass Experiment (18 July–22 August)
- 20 July – The Good Old Days (1953–1983)
- 25 August – Thames Tug (1953)
- 10 September – Rag, Tag and Bobtail (1953–1965)
- 23 September – Garrison Theatre (1953–1955)
- 26 September – A Place of Execution (1953)
- 6 October – Heidi (1953)
- 7 November – Johnny, You're Wanted (1953)
- 11 November
  - The Rose and the Ring (1953)
  - Panorama (1953–present)
- 6 December – Wuthering Heights (1953)
- 18 December – Asian Club (1953–1961)
- 26 December – The Teckman Biography (1953–1954)
- Unknown – Before Your Very Eyes (1953–1956; ITV 1956–1958)

== Continuing television shows ==
=== 1920s ===
- BBC Wimbledon (1927–1939, 1946–2019, 2021–present)

=== 1930s ===
- Trooping the Colour (1937–1939, 1946–2019, 2023–present)
- The Boat Race (1938–1939, 1946–2019, 2021–present)
- BBC Cricket (1939, 1946–1999, 2020–2024)

=== 1940s ===
- Muffin the Mule (1946–1955, 2005–2006)
- Television Newsreel (1948–1954)
- The Ed Sullivan Show (1948–1971)
- Come Dancing (1949–1998)

=== 1950s ===
- Andy Pandy (1950–1970, 2002–2005)
- Flower Pot Men (1952–1958, 2001–2002)
- Watch with Mother (1952–1975)
- The Appleyards (1952–1957)
- All Your Own (1952–1961)

== Ending this year ==
- Kaleidoscope (1946–1953)
- Café Continental (1947–1953)
- How Do You View? (1949–1953)
- Robin Hood (1953)
- The Quatermass Experiment (1953)

== Births ==
- 11 January – John Sessions, actor (d. 2020)
- 24 January – Bruce Jones, actor
- 9 February – Ciarán Hinds, Irish actor
- 17 February – Norman Pace, actor and comedian
- 27 February – Gavin Esler, author and television presenter
- 24 April – Tim Woodward, actor
- 1 May – Rob Spendlove, actor
- 16 May – Pierce Brosnan, Irish-born actor
- 19 May – Victoria Wood, comic performer (died 2016)
- 22 May – Peter Bazalgette, English television executive
- 24 May – Alfred Molina, English actor
- 26 May – Michael Portillo, English politician, journalist and broadcaster
- 19 June – Hilary Jones, physician, television host and media personality
- 7 August – Lesley Nicol, actress
- 23 September – Nicholas Witchell, journalist
- 4 October – Christopher Fairbank, English actor
- 12 October – Les Dennis, game show host, actor
- 27 October – Peter Firth, actor
- 30 October – Nigel McCrery, television screenwriter (died 2025)
- 13 November – Diana Weston, actress
- 16 November – Griff Rhys Jones, comedian, actor and writer
- 13 December – Jim Davidson, comedian

== Deaths ==
- 6 May – Harold Warrender, actor (born 1903)

== See also ==
- 1953 in British music
- 1953 in the United Kingdom
- List of British films of 1953
