= 1953 in British music =

This is a summary of 1953 in music in the United Kingdom, including the official charts from that year.

== Events ==
- 14 January – Ralph Vaughan Williams's Sinfonia antartica is given its first performance in Manchester.
- 3 February – Contralto Kathleen Ferrier, suffering from terminal cancer (unknown to the public), gives a critically acclaimed performance on the first night of a new English-language production of Gluck's Orfeo ed Euridice at the Royal Opera House, Covent Garden.
- 6 February – During the second performance of Orfeo, Kathleen Ferrier's left femur gives way; she completes the performance before going to hospital for treatment. This will be her last public performance.
- 1 April – First record by any UK act to reach number one in the UK Singles Chart, The Stargazers' recording of "Broken Wings".
- 26 May – In the 1953 Coronation Honours, Herbert Howells receives a CBE and Benjamin Britten is appointed a Companion of Honour.
- 2 June
  - The Coronation of Elizabeth II, William McKie, who had been in charge of music at the royal wedding in 1947, is organist. In addition to traditional music, such as Handel's "Zadok the Priest", Hubert Parry's "I was glad" and Samuel Sebastian Wesley's "Thou wilt keep him in perfect peace", specially commissioned works performed at the ceremony include Ralph Vaughan Williams's "O Taste and See", William Walton's "Orb and Sceptre", Arthur Bliss's "Processional", Arnold Bax's "Coronation March", and the Canadian composer Healy Willan's anthem "O Lord our Governor".
  - On the evening of the coronation, Sadler's Wells Ballet stages the first performance of Malcolm Arnold's official coronation ballet Homage to the Queen, with choreography by Frederick Ashton and Robert Irving conducting.
- 9 June – Kathleen Ferrier writes to the secretary of the Royal Philharmonic Society, thanking them for the award of the gold medal; it is thought to be the last letter she ever signed in person.
- 29 August – Michael Tippett's Fantasia Concertante on a Theme of Corelli is first performed in Edinburgh.
- October – Sir Arthur Bliss replaces Sir Arnold Bax as Master of the Queen's Music.
- 19 September – Sir Hubert Parry's 1916 setting of William Blake's "Jerusalem" first appears as a permanent feature of the Last Night of the Proms (televised).
- 19 October – Opening of the Covent Garden opera season, with a production of Wagner's Die Walküre.
- Allegri Quartet formed.

== Chart summary ==
See List of UK top-ten singles in 1953

== Number Ones ==
=== Number-one singles ===
Issue date	Song	Artist
4 January	"Here in My Heart"	Al Martino
11 January	"You Belong to Me"	Jo Stafford
18 January	"Comes A-Long A-Love"	Kay Starr
25 January	"Outside of Heaven"	Eddie Fisher
1 February	"Don't Let the Stars Get in Your Eyes"	Perry Como and the Ramblers
8 February	"Don't Let the Stars Get in Your Eyes"	Perry Como and the Ramblers
15 February	"Don't Let the Stars Get in Your Eyes"	Perry Como and the Ramblers
22 February	"Don't Let the Stars Get in Your Eyes"	Perry Como and the Ramblers
1 March	"Don't Let the Stars Get in Your Eyes"	Perry Como and the Ramblers
8 March	"She Wears Red Feathers"	Guy Mitchell
15 March	"She Wears Red Feathers"	Guy Mitchell
22 March	"She Wears Red Feathers"	Guy Mitchell
29 March	"She Wears Red Feathers"	Guy Mitchell
5 April	"Broken Wings"	Stargazers
12 April	"(How Much Is) That Doggie in the Window?"	Lita Roza
19 April	"I Believe"	Frankie Laine
26 April	"I Believe"	Frankie Laine
3 May	"I Believe"	Frankie Laine
10 May	"I Believe"	Frankie Laine
17 May	"I Believe"	Frankie Laine
24 May	"I Believe"	Frankie Laine
31 May	"I Believe"	Frankie Laine
7 June	"I Believe"	Frankie Laine
14 June	"I Believe"	Frankie Laine
21 June	"I'm Walking Behind You"	Eddie Fisher
28 June	"I Believe"	Frankie Laine
5 July	"I Believe"	Frankie Laine
12 July	"I Believe"	Frankie Laine
19 July	"I Believe"	Frankie Laine
26 July	"I Believe"	Frankie Laine
2 August	"I Believe"	Frankie Laine
9 August	"The Song from the Moulin Rouge"	Mantovani
16 August	"I Believe"	Frankie Laine
23 August	"I Believe"	Frankie Laine
30 August	"I Believe"	Frankie Laine
6 September	"Look at That Girl"	Guy Mitchell
13 September	"Look at That Girl"	Guy Mitchell
20 September	"Look at That Girl"	Guy Mitchell
27 September	"Look at That Girl"	Guy Mitchell
4 October	"Look at That Girl"	Guy Mitchell
11 October	"Look at That Girl"	Guy Mitchell
18 October	"Hey Joe"	Frankie Laine
25 October	"Hey Joe"	Frankie Laine
1 November	"Answer Me"	David Whitfield
8 November	"Answer Me"	Frankie Laine
15 November	"Answer Me"	Frankie Laine
22 November	"Answer Me"	Frankie Laine
29 November	"Answer Me"	Frankie Laine
6 December	"Answer Me"	Frankie Laine
13 December	"Answer Me"	Frankie Laine
20 December	"Answer Me"	Frankie Laine
27 December	"Answer Me"	Frankie Laine

== Classical music ==
- Malcolm Arnold – Symphony No. 2
- Michael Tippett Variations on an Elizabethan Theme

== Opera ==
- Benjamin Britten – Gloriana

== Film and Incidental music ==
- Stanley Black – Escape by Night, starring Sid James.
- Alan Rawsthorne – The Cruel Sea, starring Jack Hawkins, Donald Sinden and Denholm Elliott.

== Musical films ==
- The Beggar's Opera, directed by Peter Brook and starring Laurence Olivier, Dorothy Tutin, and Stanley Holloway.
- The Story of Gilbert and Sullivan, directed by Sidney Gilliat and starring Robert Morley, Maurice Evans and Owen Brannigan

== Births ==
- 28 January – Chris Carter, English DJ and producer
- 22 February – Graham Lewis, bass player
- 3 March – Robyn Hitchcock, singer-songwriter
- 9 April – John Howard, singer-songwriter
- 15 May – Mike Oldfield, composer
- 19 June – Simon Wright, English drummer (AC/DC, Dio, and UFO)
- 13 July – Malcolm Singer, composer and educationalist
- 22 July
  - Nigel Hess, composer
  - Brian Howe, singer-songwriter (Bad Company)
- 27 July – Eibhlis Farrell, composer
- 2 August – Donnie Munro, Scottish singer and guitarist (Runrig)
- 3 August – Ian Bairnson, multi-instrumentalist (Alan Parsons Project)
- 10 August – Gillian Elisa, actress, singer, and comedian
- 23 August – Bobby G, singer (Bucks Fizz)
- 10 October - Midge Ure, singer-songwriter and record producer
- 16 October – Brinsley Forde, singer (Aswad)
- 21 October – Eric Faulkner, guitarist, songwriter, and singer (Bay City Rollers)
- 12 November – Calum Macdonald, percussionist with Runrig

== Deaths ==
- 18 January – Arthur Wood, conductor and composer, 78
- 30 April – Lily Brayton, musical theatre star, 76
- 15 May – Mabel Love, dancer, 78
- 19 May – Frank Mullings, operatic tenor, 72
- 21 September – Roger Quilter, composer, 75
- 3 October – Sir Arnold Bax, composer, Master of the King's (and later Queen's) Musick, 69
- 8 October – Kathleen Ferrier, contralto, 41 (cancer)
- 26 November – Sir Ivor Atkins, organist and choirmaster, 83
- 11 December – Albert Coates, conductor and composer, 71
- date unknown – John Reynders, film score composer

== See also ==
- 1953 in British television
- 1953 in the United Kingdom
- List of British films of 1953
