= Voyage for Three =

1950 film

- Directed by: Jean-Paul Paulin
- Written by: Jean de Letraz
- Based on: Voyage for Three by Jean de Letraz
- Produced by: Pascal Paulin; Jean-Paul Paulin
- Starring: Jeannette Batti; Pierre-Louis; Jacques Morel
- Cinematography: Jacques Mercanton
- Edited by: Renée Guérin
- Music by: Georges Van Parys
- Production company: Francinalp
- Release date: 12 May 1950
- Running time: 82 minutes
- Country: France
- Language: French

Voyage for Three (French: Voyage à trois) is a 1950 French comedy drama film directed by Jean-Paul Paulin and starring Jeannette Batti, Pierre-Louis and Jacques Morel. It was adapted by Jean de Letraz from his own 1949 play of the same title which had appeared at the Théâtre du Palais-Royal in Paris.

== Synopsis ==
Gilbert and Maurice are best friends, but Gilbert is secretly the lover of Maurice's wife Huguette. After going on a cruise together, the three are shipwrecked and stranded on a desert island and complications ensue, particularly when they encounter an attractive native girl Zaïna.

== Cast ==
- Jeannette Batti as Huguette
- Pierre-Louis as Gilbert
- Jacques Morel as Maurice
- María Riquelme as Zaïna
- Nicolas Amato as Le commandant
- Robert Lussac as Poulot
- Jean Gosselin

== Bibliography ==
- Krawc, Alfred. International Directory of Cinematographers, Set- and Costume Designers in Film: France (from the beginnings to 1980). Saur, 1983.
- Rège, Philippe. Encyclopedia of French Film Directors, Volume 1. Scarecrow Press, 2009.
