= Nero and the Burning of Rome =

1953 film by Primo Zeglio

- Directed by: Primo Zeglio
- Screenplay by: Paolo Levi; Riccardo Testa; Primo Zeglio
- Story by: Eric Klaus
- Based on: Nerone e Messalina by David Bluhmen
- Starring: Gino Cervi; Paola Barbara; Yvonne Sanson; Milly Vitale
- Cinematography: Mario Albertelli; Tonino Delli Colli
- Edited by: Giancarlo Cappelli
- Production company: Spettacolo Film
- Distributed by: Variety Distribution
- Release date: 28 August 1953 (Italy)
- Running time: 106 minutes
- Country: Italy

Nero and the Burning of Rome (Italian: Nerone e Messalina) is a 1953 Italian epic historical drama film directed by Primo Zeglio and loosely based on real life events of Roman emperor Nero. It was based on the novel Nerone e Messalina (c.1949) by Harry Bluhmen.

== Plot ==
Although Valeria Messalina makes a brief appearance in the film, the Messalina of the film's Italian title is Nero's third wife, Statilia Messalina, who appears towards the end. The dissolute Nero has come to the imperial throne through the machinations of his mother Julia Agrippina, whom he later murders. Among his other prominent victims are his tutor Seneca the Younger and his first two wives, Claudia Octavia and Poppea Sabina. One of his mistresses, the slave girl Claudia Acte, is portrayed in the film as a Christian who introduces the emperor to their teachings and flees on learning her lover's identity. During this upheaval, Nero overturns a lamp, which leads to the burning of Rome. This he blames on the Christians and orders a general persecution, in which Acte dies. When the populace eventually rises against him, Nero takes refuge with one of his freedmen and is killed by a slave.

== Cast ==
- Gino Cervi as Nero
- Paola Barbara as Agrippina
- Yvonne Sanson as Stabilia Messalina
- Milly Vitale as Atte
- Jole Fierro as Poppaea Sabina
- Steve Barclay as charioteer
- Ludmilla Dudarova as Valeria Messalina
- Carlo Giustini as Britannicus
- Lamberto Picasso as Seneca
- Renzo Ricci as Petronius
- Carlo Tamberlani as Tigellinus (credited as Renzo Tamberlani)
- Silvana Jachino
- Memmo Carotenuto
- Elsa Vazzoler
- Cesare Bettarini

== Release ==
Nero and the Burning of Rome was released in Italy on 28 August 1953.

== See also ==
- List of Italian films of 1953
