= List of Japanese films of 1953 =

A list of films released in Japan in 1953 (see 1953 in film).

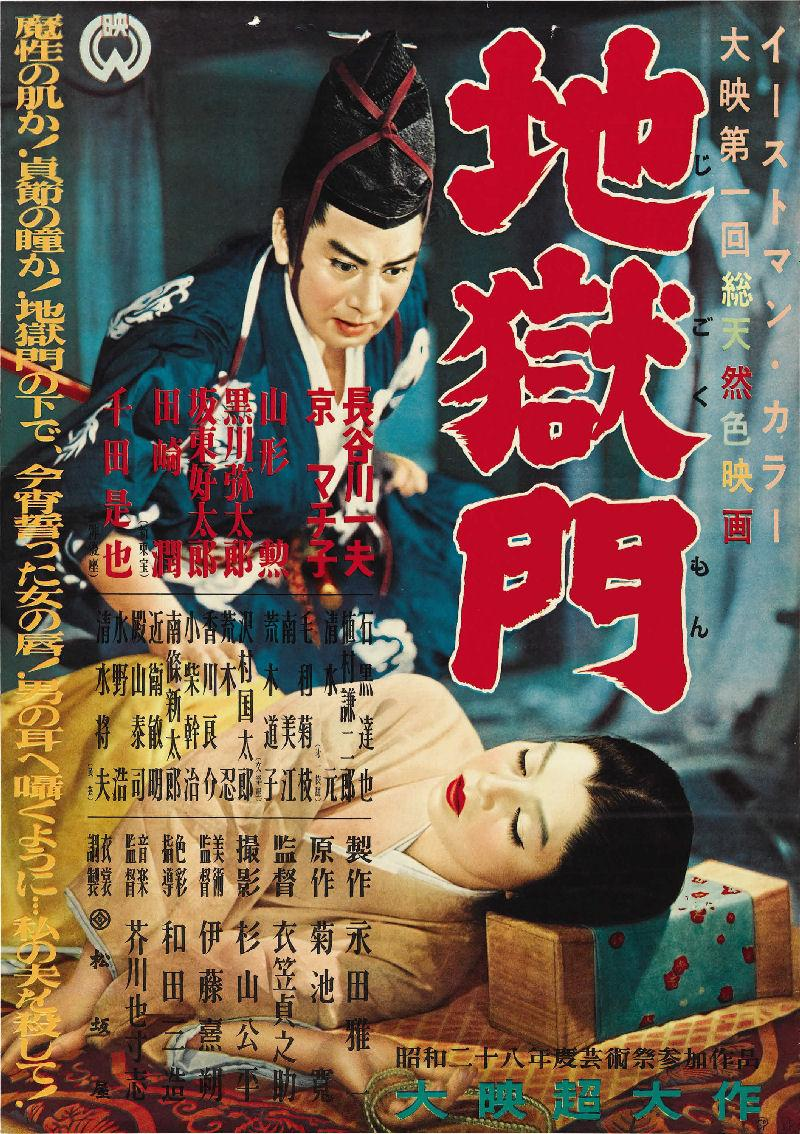
Gate of Hell

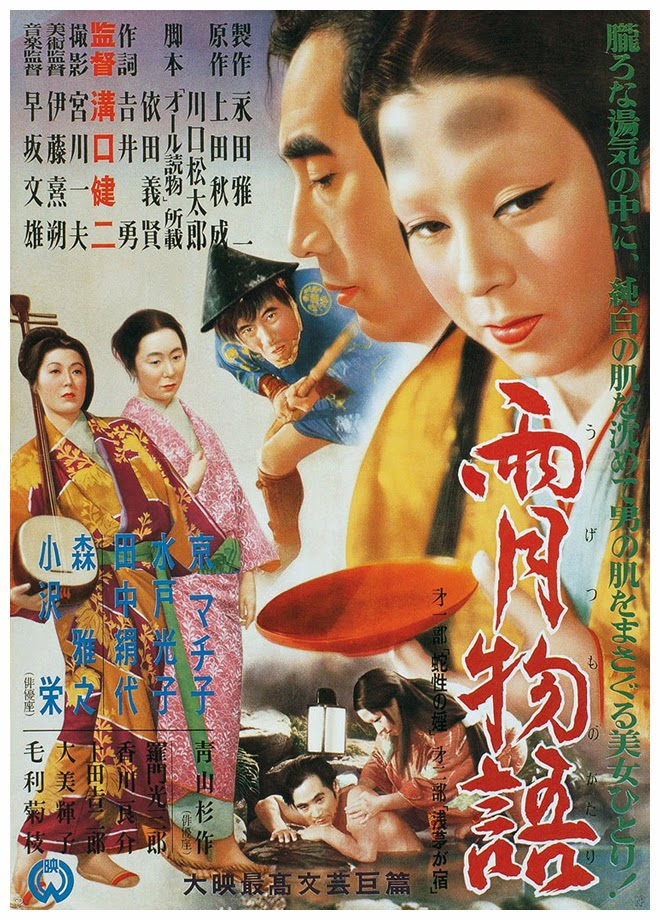
Ugetsu

== List ==
Title	Director	Cast	Genre	Notes
1953
Anatahan	Josef von Sternberg	Akemi Negishi, Tadashi Suganuma	War drama	
The Eagle of the Pacific	Ishirō Honda	Denjiro Okochi, Toshiro Mifune	War	
Entotsu no mieru basho	Heinosuke Gosho	Ken Uehara, Kinuyo Tanaka	Drama	Entered into the 3rd Berlin International Film Festival
Gate of Hell	Teinosuke Kinugasa	Kazuo Hasegawa, Machiko Kyō, Isao Yamagata	Drama	
A Geisha	Kenji Mizoguchi	Michiyo Kogure, Ayako Wakao	Drama	
Himeyuri Lily Tower	Tadashi Imai	Kyōko Kagawa, Susumu Fujita	War drama	
Husband and Wife	Mikio Naruse	Ken Uehara, Yoko Sugi	Romance	
An Inlet of Muddy Water	Tadashi Imai	Ken Mitsuda, Yoshiko Kuga	Drama	
The Last Embrace	Masahiro Makino	Yoshiko Yamaguchi, Toshirō Mifune	Romance	
Love Letter	Kinuyo Tanaka	Masayuki Mori, Yoshiko Kuga	Drama	Entered into the 1954 Cannes Film Festival
My Wonderful Yellow Car	Senkichi Taniguchi	Toshiro Mifune		
Kimi no Na wa	Hideo Ōba	Keiji Sada, Keiko Kishi	Romance	
Older Brother, Younger Sister	Mikio Naruse	Machiko Kyō, Masayuki Mori	Drama	
Tokyo Story	Yasujirō Ozu	Chishū Ryū, Chieko Higashiyama, So Yamamura	Drama	
Ugetsu	Kenji Mizoguchi	Machiko Kyō, Masayuki Mori, Eitaro Ozawa	Fantasy	
Wife	Mikio Naruse	Mieko Takamine, Ken Uehara	Drama	

== See also ==
- 1953 in Japan
