= María Riquelme =

Spanish actress

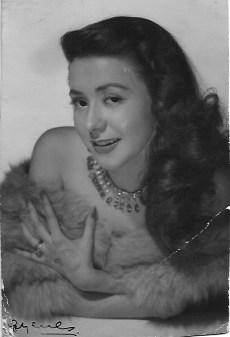
- Born: 16 February 1930; Valencia, Spain
- Died: 16 November 2019 (aged 89); Asnières-sur-Seine, France
- Occupation: Actress
- Years active: 1949–1981 (film & TV)

María Riquelme (1930–2019) was a Spanish film and television actress. She settled and worked in France. She was married to the actor Philippe Clay.

== Biography ==
The daughter of Spanish general José Riquelme y López Bago, Maria Riquelme's career took place in France, where she arrived in 1939 with her family, fleeing the Franco dictatorship in Spain.

She learned French in Marseille and studied in Vichy, then Avignon. Her family moved to Paris in 1944.

Her meeting with Danielle Darrieux in Vichy in 1941 inspired her to pursue a career in cinema. Her Spanish accent was a hindrance, so she decided to take lessons from actress Solange Sicard, where Jacques Becker spotted her. This marked the beginning of her film career. She also played numerous roles in theater, both in Spain (such as Poker de dames, which she staged and performed in Madrid in 1952) and in France (alongside Micheline Dax and Suzanne Gabriello at the cabaret “Chez Gilles”), as well as performing alongside her husband or Michel Roux (actor)(Le cargo maudit).

Wife of singer and actor Philippe Clay, she had a son, Philippe, who died in 1991.

She is buried in the family vault at Père Lachaise Cemetery in Paris (section 97).

== Selected filmography ==
- Rendezvous in July (1949)
- Voyage for Three (1950)
- The Most Beautiful Girl in the World (1951)
- Imperial Violets (1952)
- The Case Against X (1952)
- Midnight Witness (1953)
- Touchez pas aux blondes (1960)
- Dans l'eau... qui fait des bulles!... (1961)

== Bibliography ==
- Biggs, Melissa E. French films, 1945-1993: a critical filmography of the 400 most important releases. McFarland & Company, 1996.
- Goble, Alan. The Complete Index to Literary Sources in Film. Walter de Gruyter, 1999.
