= Patrick Jenkins =

Canadian animator and filmmaker

- Born: Brantford, Ontario, Canada
- Known for: paint-on-glass animator, Flip book artist, Documentary filmmaker
- Website: Patrick Jenkins Animation Page

Patrick Jenkins is a Canadian artist, animator and documentary filmmaker living in Toronto, Ontario, Canada, who specializes in paint-on-glass animation, a form of stop motion animation.

== Career ==
Patrick Jenkins studied Visual Art at York University in Toronto, earning a Master of Fine Arts (M.F.A) in Drawing and Filmmaking. After graduating, he made experimental films and exhibited his drawings in galleries in Toronto. He started making independent animated films in the 1985 and created and published his own flipbooks. He was approached by Kids Can Press to write and illustrate an instructional book to show children how to make flipbooks. The resulting book Flipbook Animation and Other Ways to Make Cartoons Move was published in 1991. The Addison Wesley Publishing Company also published this book in the U.S. with the title Animation. Portuguese and French language editions were also released.

In 2008 he created Labyrinth, a short animated, surrealistic detective movie. In 2012 he followed it up with Sorceress, a mythological adventure story. Both films were done using paint-on-glass animation.

An independent filmmaker, he scripts, directs and animates his own films. His animated films have been shown at film festivals around the world including The Ottawa International Animation Festival, the London International Animation Festival and the Melbourne International Animation Festival. His documentaries on artists have been shown on Bravo! Television Canada and CBC Television.

== Recent activity ==
His recent film Tara’s Dream won both Second Prize and Best Animation Prize at the 2010 Toronto Urban Film Festival. His film Amoeba won first prize at the 2010 Toronto Animated Image Society Showcase. His film Inner View (2009), an animated homage to the art of Canadian artist Kazuo Nakamura was an Official Selection of Animafest Zagreb, Croatia in 2010. His film Labyrinth (2008), a surreal detective story, won 1st place in the Independent, 6 to 30 Minutes Category, at the 2009 Kalamazoo Animation Festival International (KAFI) and 3rd Prize for animation at the 2010 Be Film Festival in New York City and was included in the DVD the Best of the London International Animation Festival 2009. His documentaries, Of Lines And Men: The Animation Of Jonathan Amitay and Death Is In Trouble Now: The Sculptures Of Mark Adair premiered on Bravo! Television in October 2007. His film The Skateboarder premiered at the 2005 Montreal World Film Festival and was shown at the 2005 Ottawa International Animation Festival and the prestigious 2006 Annecy International Animation Film Festival (Festival International du Film d'Animation d'Annecy) in Annecy, France. His documentary film RALPH: Coffee, Jazz and Poetry, The Poetry of Ralph Alfonso premiered at the 2001 Montreal World Film Festival and was broadcast on CBC Television's Canadian Reflections and Bravo! Television.

== Films and videotapes ==
- 2012-Sorceress, 35mm, colour, sound
- 2011-Tower Babel (sketch), DVD loop projection
- 2010-Amoeba, HDcam
- 2010-Tara’s Dream, HDcam
- 2009-Inner View, 35mm, colour, sound
- 2009-Towers Rising, DVD loop projection
- 2008-Labyrinth, 35mm, colour, sound
- 2007-Death Is In Trouble Now; The Sculptures of Mark Adair, Beta Sp, colour, sound
- 2007-Of Lines and Men; The Animation of Jonathan Amitay, Beta Sp, colour, sound
- 2005-The Skateboarder, Beta Sp, colour, sound
- 2004-Man Versus Geometry, Beta Sp, colour, sound
- 2003-Dancing Street, Beta Sp, colour, sound
- 2001-Ralph: Coffee, Jazz and Poetry; The Poetry of Ralph Alfonso, Beta Sp, colour, sound
- 2001-Crawling Around In A Fountain, Beta Sp, colour, sound
- 2000-This Is My Corner Of The World, Beta Sp, colour, sound
- 2000-Can You Pretend?, Beta Sp, colour, sound
- 1999-The Goatee Club, Beta Sp, colour, sound
- 1997-Venus In Violets, Beta Sp, colour, sound
- 1996-Animal Tales, T.V. Series, Beta Sp, colour, sound
- 1994-Animation For Kids, Beta Sp, colour, sound
- 1990-The Flipbook Movie, 16mm, colour, sound
- 1990-O.K. But I've Got To Get To Work..., 16mm, colour, sound
- 1986-Four Short Animated Films, 16mm, colour, sound
- 1982-Sign Language, 16mm, colour, sound
- 1981-Shadowplay, 16mm, colour, sound
- 1980-Ruse, 16mm, colour, sound
- 1980-A Sense of Spatial Organization, 16mm, colour, sound
- 1978-Fluster, 16mm, colour, sound
- 1976-Wedding Before Me, 16mm, colour, sound

== Awards ==
- Tara’s Dream, Second Prize and Best Animation Prize, 2010 Toronto Urban Film Festival*Amoeba first prize, 2010 Toronto Animated Image Society Showcase
- Labyrinth, 1st place (the Independent, 6 to 30 Minutes Category), 2009 KAFI Festival in Kalamazoo, U.S.
- Labyrinth, 3rd Prize for animation, 2010 Be Film Festival in New York City
- Labyrinth, selected for the DVD the Best of the London International Animation Festival 2009.
- Award between 1979 and 1996

== Bibliography ==
- 2010 Feature article on film Labyrinth, Animation Reporter Magazine (April), Mumbai, India

== Curator ==
- 2007 Death Is In Trouble Now: The Sculptures Of Mark Adair, Retrospective museum exhibition, Rodman Hall Art Centre, St. Catharines, Ontario
- 2006 John Straiton Retrospective, Ottawa International Animation Festival
- 2006 Beyond Cartoons, Animating the Personal, Cineworks, Vancouver, B.C.
- 2002 Jonathan Amitay Retrospective, Ottawa International Animation Festival
- 2002 Curatorial Essay for the exhibition "Of Lines And Men: The Cinema Of Jonathan Amitay", retrospective screening at the 2002 Ottawa International Animation Festival, National Arts Centre, Ottawa, October 2002

== Books ==
- 1993 Out of This World, a flip book
- 1993 The Magic Wand, a flip book
- 1991 Flipbook Animation and Other Ways To Make Cartoons Move
- 1991 Skateboarding, a flip book
- 1991 Slap Shot!, a flip book
- 1988/1993 A Fishy Tale, a flip book
- 1988 Play Ball, a flip book
- 1987 In The Wink Of An Eye,
- 1987/1993 The Magician's Hat, a flip book
- 1987 Making Faces, a flip book
