= A Hundred Francs a Second =

1953 film by Jean Boyer

- Directed by: Jean Boyer
- Written by: Jean Boyer; Serge Veber; Jean-Jacques Vital
- Produced by: Jean Boyer; Jean-Jacques Vital
- Starring: Henri Génès; Philippe Lemaire; Jeannette Batti
- Cinematography: Charles Suin
- Edited by: Fanchette Mazin
- Music by: Henri Betti
- Production companies: P.A.C. Société Générale de Cinématographie; Société Nouvelle Pathé Cinéma; Titanus
- Distributed by: Pathé
- Release date: 2 January 1953
- Running time: 88 minutes
- Country: France
- Language: French

A Hundred Francs a Second (French: Cent francs par seconde) is a 1953 French comedy film directed by Jean Boyer and starring Henri Génès, Philippe Lemaire and Jeannette Batti. It is a spin-off from the French radio game show of the same name.

The film's sets were designed by the art director Robert Giordani.

== Main cast ==
- Henri Génès as Fernand
- Philippe Lemaire as Philippe
- Jeannette Batti as Louloute
- Jean-Jacques Vital as L'animateur
- Geneviève Kervine as Jacqueline Bourdinet
- Jacques Eyser as Le fakir
- Gaston Orbal as Le secrétaire
- Fred Pasquali as Bourdinet
- Bourvil as himself
- Mons. Champagne as himself
- André Gillois as himself
- Charles Rigoulot as himself
- Ray Ventura as himself

== Bibliography ==
- Alfred Krautz. International directory of cinematographers, set- and costume designers in film, Volume 4. Saur, 1984.
