= 1953 in film =

The year 1953 in film involved some significant events, most notably the release of the first film released in CinemaScope, The Robe. Other releases in the United States included the hit films Peter Pan and From Here to Eternity.

== Top-grossing films (U.S.) ==
The top ten 1953 released films by box office gross in North America are as follows:

Highest-grossing films of 1953
Rank	Title	Distributor	Domestic rentals
1	The Robe	20th Century Fox	$17,500,000
2	From Here to Eternity	Columbia	$12,200,000
3	Shane	Paramount	$8,000,000
4	How to Marry a Millionaire	20th Century Fox	$7,300,000
5	Peter Pan	RKO/Walt Disney	$6,000,000
6	House of Wax	Warner Bros.	$5,500,000
7	Gentlemen Prefer Blondes	20th Century Fox	$5,100,000
8	Salome	Columbia	$4,750,000
9	Mogambo	MGM	$4,576,000
10	Knights of the Round Table	MGM	$4,518,000

== Events ==
- January 16 – A new Warner Bros. Pictures Inc. is incorporated following a Consent Judgment to divest their Warner Bros. Theatres. Stanley Warner Theatres is incorporated the following January 30 to take on the theatre chain now independent of Warner Bros.
- February 5 – Walt Disney's production of J.M. Barrie's Peter Pan, starring Bobby Driscoll and Kathryn Beaumont, premieres to astounding acclaim from critics and audiences and quickly becomes one of the most beloved Disney films. This is the last Disney animated movie released in partnership with RKO Pictures, becoming the last ever smash hit movie of the later company before it bankrupted in 1959.
- February 25 – Jacques Tati's film Les Vacances de M. Hulot is released in France, introducing the gauche character of Monsieur Hulot.
- July 1 – Stalag 17, directed by Billy Wilder and starring William Holden, premieres and is considered by the critics and audiences to be one of the greatest WWII Prisoner of War films ever made. Holden wins the Academy Award for Best Actor for his performance in the film.
- August 5 – Fred Zinnemann's romantic and war masterpiece From Here to Eternity, starring Burt Lancaster, Montgomery Clift, Deborah Kerr, Frank Sinatra, and Donna Reed, premieres.
- August 27 – William Wyler's romantic comedy Roman Holiday, starring Gregory Peck and Audrey Hepburn, is premièred and propels Hepburn to super stardom.
- September 16 – Religious epic The Robe, starring Richard Burton and Jean Simmons, debuts as the first widescreen anamorphic film in cinema history, filmed in CinemaScope grossing a record $36,000 for a single theatre in its first day. It went on to gross a record (for a single theater) $264,428 in its first week.
- November 21 – Monogram Pictures, which had stopped releasing pictures under that banner from the start of the year, changes its name to Allied Artists Pictures Corporation.

== Awards ==
Category/Organization	11th Golden Globe Awards January 22, 1954		26th Academy Awards March 25, 1954
Category/Organization	Drama	Comedy or Musical	26th Academy Awards March 25, 1954
Best Film	The Robe		From Here to Eternity
Best Director	Fred Zinnemann; From Here to Eternity		
Best Actor	Spencer Tracy; The Actress	David Niven; The Moon Is Blue	William Holden; Stalag 17
Best Actress	Audrey Hepburn; Roman Holiday	Ethel Merman; Call Me Madam	Audrey Hepburn; Roman Holiday
Best Supporting Actor	Frank Sinatra; From Here to Eternity		
Best Supporting Actress	Grace Kelly; Mogambo		Donna Reed; From Here to Eternity
Best Screenplay, Adapted	Helen Deutsch; Lili		Daniel Taradash; From Here to Eternity
Best Screenplay, Original	Helen Deutsch; Lili		Charles Brackett, Walter Reisch and Richard L. Breen; Titanic

== Notable films released in 1953 ==
United States unless stated

=== # ===
- 99 River Street, starring John Payne and Evelyn Keyes
- The 5,000 Fingers of Dr. T., starring Tommy Rettig, screenplay by Dr. Seuss

=== A ===
- Abbott and Costello Go to Mars
- Abbott and Costello Meet Dr. Jekyll and Mr. Hyde
- Act of Love (Un acte d'amour), starring Kirk Douglas – (US/France)
- The Actress, starring Spencer Tracy and Jean Simmons
- Albert R.N., directed by Lewis Gilbert, starring Anthony Steel, Jack Warner, Robert Beatty, William Sylvester – (GB)
- The All-American, starring Tony Curtis
- All I Desire, starring Barbara Stanwyck
- All the Brothers Were Valiant, starring Ann Blyth
- Anarkali – (India)
- Appointment in Honduras, directed by Jacques Tourneur, starring Ann Sheridan and Glenn Ford
- Arrowhead, starring Charlton Heston and Jack Palance

=== B ===
- Baaz, directed by and starring Guru Dutt – (India)
- The Band Wagon, starring Fred Astaire, Cyd Charisse, Jack Buchanan, Nanette Fabray, Oscar Levant
- The Bandit of Brazil (O Cangaceiro) – (Brazil)
- Barabbas, directed by Alf Sjöberg – (Sweden)
- The Beast from 20,000 Fathoms, starring Paula Raymond and Cecil Kellaway
- Beat the Devil, directed by John Huston, starring Humphrey Bogart, Jennifer Jones, Gina Lollobrigida – (Italy/GB/US)
- The Beggar's Opera, starring Laurence Olivier and Dorothy Tutin – (GB)
- Belinsky – (U.S.S.R.)
- Ben and Me, featuring the voices of Sterling Holloway and Charles Ruggles
- Beneath the 12-Mile Reef, starring Robert Wagner
- Bienvenido Mr. Marshall, directed by Luis García Berlanga, starring Fernando Rey – (Spain)
- The Big Heat, directed by Fritz Lang, starring Glenn Ford, Gloria Grahame, Lee Marvin
- Big Leaguer, starring Edward G. Robinson
- The Bigamist, directed by and starring Ida Lupino, with Joan Fontaine, Edmond O'Brien
- Black Ermine – (Argentina)
- Blowing Wild, starring Gary Cooper and Barbara Stanwyck
- The Blue Gardenia, starring Anne Baxter and Raymond Burr
- A Blueprint for Murder, starring Joseph Cotten and Jean Peters
- Bread, Love and Dreams (Pane, amore e fantasia), starring Vittorio De Sica and Gina Lollobrigida – (Italy)
- Bright Road, the first feature-film appearance of Harry Belafonte (US)
- The Brute (El Bruto), directed by Luis Buñuel, starring Pedro Armendáriz and Katy Jurado – (Mexico)
- By the Light of the Silvery Moon, starring Doris Day and Gordon MacRae

=== C ===
- The Caddy, starring Dean Martin and Jerry Lewis
- Calamity Jane, starring Doris Day
- Call Me Madam, starring Ethel Merman
- The Captain's Paradise, starring Alec Guinness – (GB)
- Cease Fire
- The Charge at Feather River, starring Guy Madison
- City Beneath the Sea, starring Robert Ryan, Anthony Quinn, Mala Powers
- City That Never Sleeps, starring Gig Young, William Talman, Paula Raymond, Mala Powers
- The Clown, starring Red Skelton
- Confidentially Connie, starring Van Johnson and Janet Leigh
- The Conquest of Everest – (documentary) – (GB)
- The Cruel Sea, starring Jack Hawkins and Denholm Elliott – (GB)
- Cry of the Hunted, starring Vittorio Gassman, Barry Sullivan, Polly Bergen

=== D ===
- Dangerous Crossing, starring Jeanne Crain and Michael Rennie
- Dangerous When Wet, starring Esther Williams
- Decameron Nights, starring Joan Fontaine and Louis Jourdan
- The Desert Rats, starring Richard Burton and James Mason
- Desperate Moment, starring Dirk Bogarde and Mai Zetterling – (GB)
- Devdas – (India)
- Do Bigha Zamin (Two Acres of Land), directed by Bimal Roy – (India)
- Donovan's Brain, starring Lew Ayres and Nancy Davis
- Down Among the Sheltering Palms, starring Mitzi Gaynor, Gloria DeHaven, Jane Greer
- Dream Wife, starring Cary Grant and Deborah Kerr

=== E ===
- The Earrings of Madame de..., directed by Max Ophüls, starring Charles Boyer – (France/Italy)
- East of Sumatra, starring Anthony Quinn and Jeff Chandler
- Easy to Love, starring Esther Williams
- Easy Years (Anni facili), directed by Luigi Zampa – (Italy)
- The Eddie Cantor Story, starring Keefe Brasselle
- Él (Him), directed by Luis Buñuel, starring Arturo de Córdova – (Mexico)
- Entotsu no mieru basho (The Four Chimneys) – (Japan)
- Esa pareja feliz (That Happy Couple), directed by Juan Antonio Bardem and Luis García Berlanga – (Spain)
- Escape By Night, starring Bonar Colleano and Sid James – (GB)
- Escape from Fort Bravo, directed by John Sturges, starring William Holden, Eleanor Parker, John Forsythe

=== F ===
- Fair Wind to Java, starring Fred MacMurray and Vera Ralston
- The Farmer Takes a Wife, starring Betty Grable
- Fast Company, starring Howard Keel and Polly Bergen
- Fear and Desire, directed by Stanley Kubrick
- The Final Test, directed by Anthony Asquith, starring Jack Warner (GB)
- Folly to Be Wise, directed by Frank Launder, starring Alastair Sim – (GB)
- Footpath, starring Dilip Kumar – (India)
- From Here to Eternity, directed by Fred Zinnemann, starring Burt Lancaster, Montgomery Clift, Deborah Kerr, Frank Sinatra, Donna Reed – winner of 8 Oscars

=== G ===
- Gate of Hell (Jigokumon) – (Japan)
- A Geisha (Gion Bayashi), directed by Kenji Mizoguchi – (Japan)
- Genevieve, starring Dinah Sheridan, John Gregson, Kay Kendall – (GB)
- Gentlemen Prefer Blondes, directed by Howard Hawks, starring Jane Russell and Marilyn Monroe
- The Girl Next Door, starring June Haver and Dan Dailey
- The Girl Who Had Everything, starring Elizabeth Taylor, William Powell, Fernando Lamas, Gig Young
- Give a Girl a Break, directed by Stanley Donen, starring Debbie Reynolds, Marge Champion, Gower Champion
- The Glass Wall, starring Vittorio Gassman and Gloria Grahame
- The Golden Blade, starring Rock Hudson and Piper Laurie
- The Great Adventure (Det stora äventyret), directed by Arne Sucksdorff – (Sweden)
- The Great Sioux Uprising, starring Jeff Chandler
- Gun Fury, starring Rock Hudson and Donna Reed

=== H ===
- The Heart of the Matter, starring Trevor Howard – (GB)
- The Hitch-Hiker, directed by Ida Lupino, starring Edmond O'Brien and William Talman
- Hondo, starring John Wayne and Geraldine Page in her film debut
- Houdini, starring (husband and wife) Tony Curtis and Janet Leigh
- House of Wax, starring Vincent Price
- How to Marry a Millionaire, starring Marilyn Monroe, Betty Grable, Lauren Bacall (Grable, Fox's top star of the 1940s, with Monroe, Fox's top star of the 1950s)

=== I ===
- I Confess, directed by Alfred Hitchcock, starring Montgomery Clift and Anne Baxter
- The I Don't Care Girl, starring Mitzi Gaynor
- I, the Jury, starring Biff Elliot and Peggie Castle
- Inferno, starring Robert Ryan
- Interim, directed by Stan Brakhage, short film (25 ½ minutes); music by James Tenney)
- The Intruder, starring Jack Hawkins – (GB)
- Is Your Honeymoon Really Necessary?, starring Bonar Colleano and Diana Dors – (GB)
- Island in the Sky, starring John Wayne
- It Came from Outer Space, directed by Jack Arnold, starring Richard Carlson
- Invaders from Mars, directed by William Cameron Menzies

=== J ===
- Jennifer, starring Ida Lupino and Howard Duff
- Jeopardy, starring Barbara Stanwyck, Barry Sullivan, Ralph Meeker
- Julius Caesar, directed by Joseph L. Mankiewicz, starring Marlon Brando, James Mason, John Gielgud, Louis Calhern, Greer Garson, Deborah Kerr

=== K ===
- The Kidnappers, starring Jon Whiteley – (GB)
- King of the Khyber Rifles, starring Tyrone Power
- Kiss Me Kate, starring Kathryn Grayson, Howard Keel, Ann Miller, released in 2-D and 3-D

=== L ===
- The Lady Without Camelias (La signora senza camelie), directed by Michelangelo Antonioni – (Italy)
- The Landowner's Daughter (Sinhá Moça), starring Anselmo Duarte – (Brazil)
- Lagu Kenangan (L. Inata), starring Titien Sumarni and AN Alcaff (Indonesia)
- Latin Lovers, starring Lana Turner
- Law and Order, a western starring Ronald Reagan
- The Lawless Breed, starring Rock Hudson
- Lili, starring Leslie Caron
- The Limping Man, starring Lloyd Bridges – (GB)
- A Lion Is in the Streets, starring James Cagney, Barbara Hale, Anne Francis
- Little Boy Lost, starring Bing Crosby
- Little Fugitive
- The Living Desert, winner of Academy Award for Best Documentary Feature
- Love in the City (L'Amore in Città), an anthology film directed by Michelangelo Antonioni, Dino Risi, Federico Fellini and others – (Italy)
- Love Letter (Koibumi) – (Japan)

=== M ===
- Malta Story, directed by Brian Desmond Hurst, starring Alec Guinness, Jack Hawkins, Anthony Steel, Muriel Pavlow – (GB)
- Man in the Attic, starring Jack Palance and Constance Smith
- The Man Between, starring James Mason and Claire Bloom – (GB)
- Man in the Dark, starring Edmond O'Brien and Audrey Totter
- Man on a Tightrope, starring Fredric March and Gloria Grahame
- Martin Luther – (US/West Germany)
- The Master of Ballantrae, directed by William Keighley, starring Errol Flynn, Roger Livesey, Anthony Steel, Beatrice Campbell – (U.K.)
- Meet Me at the Fair, starring Dan Dailey and Diana Lynn
- Miss Sadie Thompson, starring Rita Hayworth
- The Mississippi Gambler, starring Tyrone Power and Piper Laurie
- Mogambo, starring Clark Gable, Ava Gardner, Grace Kelly (remake of 1932's Red Dust which starred Gable with Jean Harlow)
- Money from Home, starring Dean Martin and Jerry Lewis
- Monsieur Hulot's Holiday (Les Vacances de Monsieur Hulot), directed by and starring Jacques Tati – (France)
- La montaña sin ley
- The Moon Is Blue, first U.S. movie to use the words "pregnant" and "virgin", directed by Otto Preminger, starring William Holden, David Niven, Maggie McNamara
- The Moonlighter, starring Barbara Stanwyck and Fred MacMurray

=== N ===
- The Naked Spur, starring James Stewart, Robert Ryan and Janet Leigh
- The Net, directed by Anthony Asquith – (GB)
- Niagara, starring Marilyn Monroe and Joseph Cotten
- No Way Back (Weg Ohne Umkehr) – (West Germany)

=== P ===
- Patita, starring Dev Anand and Usha Kiran – (India)
- Peter Pan, a Walt Disney animation featuring the voice of Bobby Driscoll
- The Phantom Stockman, starring Chips Rafferty – (Australia)
- Pickup on South Street, directed by Sam Fuller, starring Richard Widmark, Jean Peters, Thelma Ritter
- Plunder of the Sun, starring Glenn Ford
- Pony Express, starring Charlton Heston (as Buffalo Bill)
- The President's Lady (Charlton Heston's first turn at Andrew Jackson before The Buccaneer)

=== R ===
- Remains to Be Seen, starring June Allyson and Van Johnson
- Report News (Reportaje), starring Arturo de Córdova and Dolores del Río – (Mexico)
- Return to Paradise, starring Gary Cooper
- Ride, Vaquero!, starring Robert Taylor and Ava Gardner
- The Robe, the first movie filmed in CinemaScope, starring Richard Burton and Jean Simmons
- Rogue's March, starring Peter Lawford, Janice Rule
- Roman Holiday, directed by William Wyler, starring Gregory Peck and Audrey Hepburn in her Oscar-winning first leading role
- Rosanna (La Red) – (Mexico)

=== S ===
- Salome, starring Rita Hayworth
- Sawdust and Tinsel (Gycklarnas afton), directed by Ingmar Bergman – (Sweden)
- Scared Stiff, starring Dean Martin, Jerry Lewis, Lizabeth Scott and Carmen Miranda
- Sea Devils, starring Rock Hudson and Yvonne De Carlo – (GB/US)
- Seminole, starring Rock Hudson and Anthony Quinn
- Shane, directed by George Stevens, starring Alan Ladd, Jean Arthur (in her final film role), Brandon deWilde, Ben Johnson, Jack Palance
- Siamo Donne (We, the Women), starring Alida Valli and Ingrid Bergman – (Italy)
- Small Town Girl, starring Jane Powell and Ann Miller
- So Big, directed by Robert Wise, starring Jane Wyman, Sterling Hayden, Steve Forrest
- So This Is Love, starring Kathryn Grayson and Merv Griffin
- South Sea Woman, starring Burt Lancaster and Virginia Mayo
- Split Second, starring Alexis Smith and Jan Sterling
- Stalag 17, directed by Billy Wilder, starring William Holden (in his Oscar-winning role), Don Taylor, Harvey Lembeck, Robert Strauss, Otto Preminger, Peter Graves
- Stars of the Russian Ballet (Mastera russkogo baleta), starring Galina Ulanova – (USSR)
- The State Department Store (Állami Áruház) – (Hungary)
- The Steel Lady, starring Rod Cameron and Tab Hunter
- The Story of Gilbert and Sullivan, starring Robert Morley and Maurice Evans – (GB)
- The Story of Little Muck (Die Geschichte vom kleinen Muck) – (East Germany)
- The Story of Three Loves, trilogy starring James Mason, Leslie Caron, Kirk Douglas
- Summer with Monika (Sommaren med Monika), directed by Ingmar Bergman, starring Harriet Andersson – (Sweden)
- The Sun Shines Bright, directed by John Ford, starring Charles Winninger

=== T ===
- Take Me to Town, directed by Douglas Sirk, starring Ann Sheridan and Sterling Hayden
- Take the High Ground!, starring Richard Widmark and Karl Malden
- Thérèse Raquin, directed by Marcel Carné, starring Simone Signoret – (France)
- Three Perfect Wives (Las Tres perfectas casadas), starring Arturo de Córdova – (Mexico)
- Thunder Over the Plains, starring Randolph Scott
- Titanic, starring Barbara Stanwyck, Clifton Webb, Thelma Ritter, Brian Aherne, Robert Wagner
- The Titfield Thunderbolt, directed by Charles Crichton, starring Stanley Holloway – (GB)
- Tokyo Story (Tōkyō Monogatari), directed by Yasujirō Ozu – (Japan)
- Toot, Whistle, Plunk and Boom
- Torch Song, starring Joan Crawford
- Treasure of the Golden Condor, directed by Delmer Daves, starring Cornel Wilde
- Tropic Zone, starring Ronald Reagan
- Trouble Along the Way, starring John Wayne
- Trouble in Store, starring Norman Wisdom – (GB)
- Tumbleweed, starring Audie Murphy
- Twice Upon a Time, directed by Emeric Pressburger – (GB)

=== U ===
- Ugetsu Monogatari, directed by Kenji Mizoguchi – (Japan)

=== V ===
- The Vanquished (I Vinti), directed by Michelangelo Antonioni – (Italy)
- I Vitelloni, directed by Federico Fellini – (France/Italy)

=== W ===
- The Wages of Fear (Le Salaire de la Peur), directed by Henri-Georges Clouzot, starring Yves Montand – winner of Golden Bear and Palme d'Or awards – (France)
- Walking My Baby Back Home, starring Janet Leigh and Donald O'Connor
- War Arrow, starring Maureen O'Hara and Jeff Chandler
- The War of the Worlds, starring Gene Barry
- White Lightning, starring Stanley Clements and Steve Brodie
- White Mane (Crin Blanc, Cheval Sauvage) – (France)
- White Witch Doctor, starring Robert Mitchum and Susan Hayward
- The Wild One, starring Marlon Brando

=== Y ===
- Young Bess, starring Jean Simmons, Deborah Kerr, Charles Laughton

== Serials ==
- Canadian Mounties vs Atomic Invaders, starring Bill Henry
- The Great Adventures of Captain Kidd, starring Richard Crane
- Jungle Drums of Africa, starring Clayton Moore and Phyllis Coates
- The Lost Planet, starring Judd Holdren

== Short film series ==
- Mickey Mouse (1928)-(1953)
- Looney Tunes (1930–1969)
- Terrytoons (1930–1964)
- Merrie Melodies (1931–1969)
- Popeye (1933–1957)
- Donald Duck (1934)-(1956)
- The Three Stooges (1934–1959)
- Goofy (1939)-(1953)
- Tom and Jerry (1940–1958)
- Bugs Bunny (1940)-(1964)
- Chip and Dale (1943–1956)
- Droopy (1943–1958)
- Sylvester the Cat (1944–1966)
- Yosemite Sam (1945–1963)
- Speedy Gonzales (1953–1968)

== Births ==
- January 1:
  - Paul Antony-Barber, English actor
  - Brian Pettifer, South African actor
  - Mary Sweeney, American director, writer, editor and producer
- January 4: Richard Frank, American actor (died 1995)
- January 7: John Dugan, American actor
- January 8:
  - Damián Alcázar, Mexican actor
  - Tonita Castro, Mexican-born American actress (died 2016)
- January 11: John Sessions, British actor and comedian (died 2020)
- January 12: Phil Reeves, American actor and screenwriter
- January 27:
  - Richard Bremmer, English actor
  - Joe Bob Briggs, American film critic, writer and actor
- January 28: Susan Buckner, American actress (died 2024)
- January 30: Steven Zaillian, director
- February 8: Mary Steenburgen, American actress
- February 9:
  - Vito Antuofermo, Italian-American actor
  - Ciarán Hinds, British-Irish actor
- February 11: Philip Anglim, actor
- February 12:
  - Peter Andersson, Swedish actor
  - Joanna Kerns, American actress and director
- February 14: Brian O'Connor, American actor and comedian
- February 15: Lynn Whitfield, American actress
- February 16: Serge Houde, Canadian actor
- February 17:
  - Becky Ann Baker, American actress
  - Evan C. Kim, American actor
- February 18: Rocco Sisto, Italian-American actor
- February 19: Massimo Troisi, actor (died 1994)
- February 21:
  - Christine Ebersole, American actress and singer
  - William Petersen, American actor
- March 2: Ezra Swerdlow, film producer (died 2018)
- March 4:
  - Scott Hicks, director
  - Kay Lenz, American actress
  - Agustí Villaronga, Spanish director (died 2023)
- March 6: Jacklyn Zeman, American actress (died 2023)
- March 10: Paul Haggis, Canadian screenwriter, producer and director
- March 15: Frances Conroy, American actress
- March 16: Isabelle Huppert, French actress
- March 24: Louie Anderson, American stand-up comedian and actor (died 2022)
- April 1: Barry Sonnenfeld, American filmmaker and television director
- April 2: Debralee Scott, American actress (died 2005)
- April 6: Patrick Doyle, Scottish film composer
- April 13:
  - Esther Scott, American actress (died 2020)
  - Harry Waters Jr., American actor and singer
- April 16:
  - Jay O. Sanders, actor
  - Marshall Teague, American actor
- April 18: Rick Moranis, Canadian actor & comedian
- April 19: Ruby Wax, American-British actress, comedian, writer and television personality
- April 23: James Russo, American actor
- April 24: Eric Bogosian, American actor
- April 25: Ron Clements, American animator, director, screenwriter and producer
- April 26: Nancy Lenehan, American actress
- May 4:
  - Anang Desai, Indian actor
  - David Thornton, American actor
- May 9:
  - Dennie Gordon, American director
  - Amy Hill, American stand-up comedian, actress and voice actress
- May 16: Pierce Brosnan, Irish actor
- May 21: Nora Aunor, Filipino actress
- May 24: Alfred Molina, English actor
- May 29: Danny Elfman, American composer
- May 30: Colm Meaney, Irish actor
- June 1: Tim Bentinck, Australian-born British actor and writer
- June 3: Erland Van Lidth De Jeude, Dutch-American actor (d. 1987)
- June 5: Kathleen Kennedy, American producer
- June 7:
  - Colleen Camp, American character actress and producer
  - Robert Trebor, American character actor (d. 2025)
- June 9: Ron White, Canadian actor (d. 2018)
- June 12: David Thornton, American actor
- June 13: Tim Allen, American actor
- June 16: Valerie Mahaffey, American character actress and producer (d. 2025)
- June 19: Ken Davitian, American character actor and comedian
- June 21: Michael Bowen, American actor
- June 22: Cyndi Lauper, American singer, songwriter, actress and activist
- June 26: Peng Xiaolian, director (died 2019)
- June 29: Deirdre O'Connell, American character actress
- July 1: David Gulpilil, Indigenous-Australian actor (died 2021)
- July 5: Harish Patel, Indian actor
- July 6: Stanley DeSantis, American actor (died 2005)
- July 10: Marco Rodríguez, American actor
- July 11:
  - Angélica Aragón, Mexican actress and singer
  - Mindy Sterling, American actress
- July 13: Gil Birmingham, American actor
- July 20: Lee Garlington, American actress
- July 26: Lesli Linka Glatter, American director
- July 30: Phil Davis, English actor, writer and director
- August 6: Valerie Wildman, American actress
- August 7: Lesley Nicol, English actress
- August 8: Don Most, American actor and singer
- August 9: Alf Humphreys, Canadian actor (died 2018)
- August 11: Hulk Hogan, American professional wrestler and occasional actor (died 2025)
- August 12: Selina Cadell, English actress
- August 13: Victor Colicchio, American actor, screenwriter, musician and songwriter
- August 14: James Horner, American composer (died 2015)
- August 16: Vincent Curatola, American actor
- August 18: Sergio Castellitto, Italian actor, director and screenwriter
- August 27: Peter Stormare, Swedish actor
- August 28: Dee Dee Rescher, American actress
- August 30: Robin Harris, American comedian and actor (died 1990)
- September 2: Keith Allen, British actor
- September 3: Jean-Pierre Jeunet, French director and screenwriter
- September 6:
  - Anne Lockhart, American actress
  - Patti Yasutake, American actress (died 2024)
- September 10: Amy Irving, American actress
- September 14: Robert Wisdom, American actor
- September 16:
  - Lenny Clarke, American comedian and actor
  - Kurt Fuller, American character actor
- September 18: Anna Thomson, American actress
- September 25: Jayne Houdyshell, American actress
- October 4:
  - Christopher Fairbank, English actor
  - Tchéky Karyo, Turkish-born French actor and musician (died 2025)
  - Kerry Sherman, American actress
- October 9:
  - Barbara March, Canadian actress (died 2019)
  - Tony Shalhoub, American actor
- October 11:
  - David Morse, American actor, singer, director and writer
  - Bill Randolph, American actor
- October 12: David Threlfall, English actor and director
- October 15: Larry Miller, American comedian, actor, news podcaster and columnist
- October 20: Bill Nunn, American actor (died 2016)
- October 26:
  - Roger Allam, British actor
  - Maureen Teefy, actress
- October 27:
  - Peter Firth, English actor
  - Robert Picardo, American actor
- October 30: Charles Martin Smith, American actor, writer and director
- October 31: Michael J. Anderson, actor
- November 3:
  - Kate Capshaw, American actress
  - Dennis Miller, American comedian and television host
- November 6: Ron Underwood, American director
- November 8: John Musker, American animator, director, screenwriter and producer
- November 13: Tom Villard, American actor (died 1993)
- November 18:
  - Kevin Nealon, American stand-up comedian and actor
  - Kath Soucie, American voice actress
- November 19: Robert Beltran, American actor
- November 20: Bembol Roco, Filipino actor
- November 23: George DelHoyo, Uruguayan-born American actor
- November 24: Glenn Withrow, American actor, director, producer and writer
- November 27:
  - Curtis Armstrong, American actor and singer
  - Mohammad Bakri, Palestinian actor and director (died 2025)
- November 28: Pamela Hayden, American actress and voice actress
- December 6:
  - Gina Hecht, American actress
  - Tom Hulce, American actor
  - Wil Shriner, American actor, comedian, director and screenwriter
- December 8:
  - Kim Basinger, American actress
  - Sam Kinison, American stand-up comedian (died 1992)
- December 9: John Malkovich, American actor
- December 11: Richard Carter, Australian actor and voice-over artist (died 2019)
- December 14: Vijay Amritraj, Indian sports commentator and actor
- December 17:
  - Barry Livingston, American actor
  - Sally Menke, American editor (died 2010)
  - Bill Pullman, American actor
- December 18:
  - Melanie Kinnaman, American dancer and actress
  - Jeff Kober, American actor
- December 22:
  - Jay Brazeau, Canadian actor
  - Gregor Fisher, Scottish comedian and actor
- December 23: John Callahan, actor (died 2020)
- December 24: Timothy Carhart, American actor
- December 28: James Foley, American director (died 2025)
- December 29: Charlayne Woodard, American playwright and actress
- December 31: James Remar, American actor

== Deaths ==
- January 19: Arthur Hoyt, 78, American actor, Her Private Affair, Goldie Gets Along
- February 2: Alan Curtis, 43, American actor, High Sierra, Buck Privates
- February 27: Jessie Coles Grayson, 66, African-American contralto and actress, Cass Timberlane
- March 5: Herman J. Mankiewicz, 55, American screenwriter, Citizen Kane, The Pride of the Yankees, Dinner at Eight, Man of the World
- March 19: Irene Bordoni, 68, Corsican-American actress and singer, Paris, Louisiana Purchase
- April 26: Rian James, 53, American screenwriter, 42nd Street, The Housekeeper's Daughter
- May 30: Dooley Wilson, 67, American actor, Casablanca, Stormy Weather
- June 5: Roland Young, 65, British actor, Topper, Ruggles of Red Gap, The Philadelphia Story, And Then There Were None
- June 27: Chris-Pin Martin, 59, American actor, The Gay Caballero, Ride on Vaquero, Robin Hood of Monterey, King of the Bandits
- June 30: Vsevolod Pudovkin, Soviet film director (born 1893)
- July 3: Irving Reis, 47, American director, The Big Street, All My Sons
- August 6
  - John Reinhardt, Austrian director, Sofia, Chicago Calling
  - Houseley Stevenson, American actor, Dark Passage, Kidnapped
- August 9: Henri Étiévant, French actor, director (born 1870)
- August 13: Paul Kemp, German actor (born 1896), Charley's Aunt
- August 17: Albert Austin, British actor and director (born 1882), Suds, A Prince of a King
- September 12: Lewis Stone, American actor (born 1879), Andy Hardy film series, The Prisoner of Zenda, Grand Hotel
- October 6: Porter Hall, American actor (born 1888), Double Indemnity, Mr. Smith Goes to Washington, Going My Way, Miracle on 34th Street
- October 8: Nigel Bruce, British actor (born 1895), Sherlock Holmes film series, Suspicion, Rebecca, The Rains Came, Treasure Island
- October 13: Millard Mitchell, American character actor (born 1903), Singin' in the Rain, Winchester '73, The Gunfighter, The Naked Spur, Twelve O'Clock High
- November 29: Sam De Grasse, Canadian actor (born 1875), Robin Hood, Blind Husbands
- December 29: Violet MacMillan, American actress (born 1887), The Magic Cloak of Oz, Violet's Dreams

== Debuts ==
- Claude Akins – From Here to Eternity
- Harry Andrews – The Red Beret
- Carroll Baker – Easy to Love
- Henry Beckman – Niagara
- Fanny Carby – Meet Mr. Lucifer
- Jeanne Cooper – The Redhead from Wyoming
- Kathryn Crosby – So This Is Love
- Richard Deacon – Invaders from Mars
- Carl Duering – Appointment in London
- Shirley Eaton – Personal Affair
- Anita Ekberg – The Mississippi Gambler
- Biff Elliot – I, the Jury
- Götz George – When the White Lilacs Bloom Again
- Leo Gordon – China Venture
- Lou Jacobi – Is Your Honeymoon Really Necessary?
- David Kossoff – The Good Beginning
- Stanley Kubrick (director) – Fear and Desire
- Jan Malmsjö – Marianne
- Paul Mazursky – Fear and Desire
- Alec McCowen – The Cruel Sea
- Steve McQueen – Girl on the Run
- Jill Melford – Will Any Gentleman...?
- Nanette Newman – Personal Affair
- Geraldine Page – Hondo
- Lee Patterson – Malta Story
- Anthony Perkins – The Actress
- Marion Ross – Forever Female
- Bing Russell – Big Leaguer
- Romy Schneider – When the White Lilacs Bloom Again
- Harry Shearer – Abbott and Costello Go to Mars
- Joan Sims – Will Any Gentleman...?
- Mel Welles – Appointment in Honduras
- Billie Whitelaw – The Fake
