= Jeannette Batti =

French actress (1921–2011)

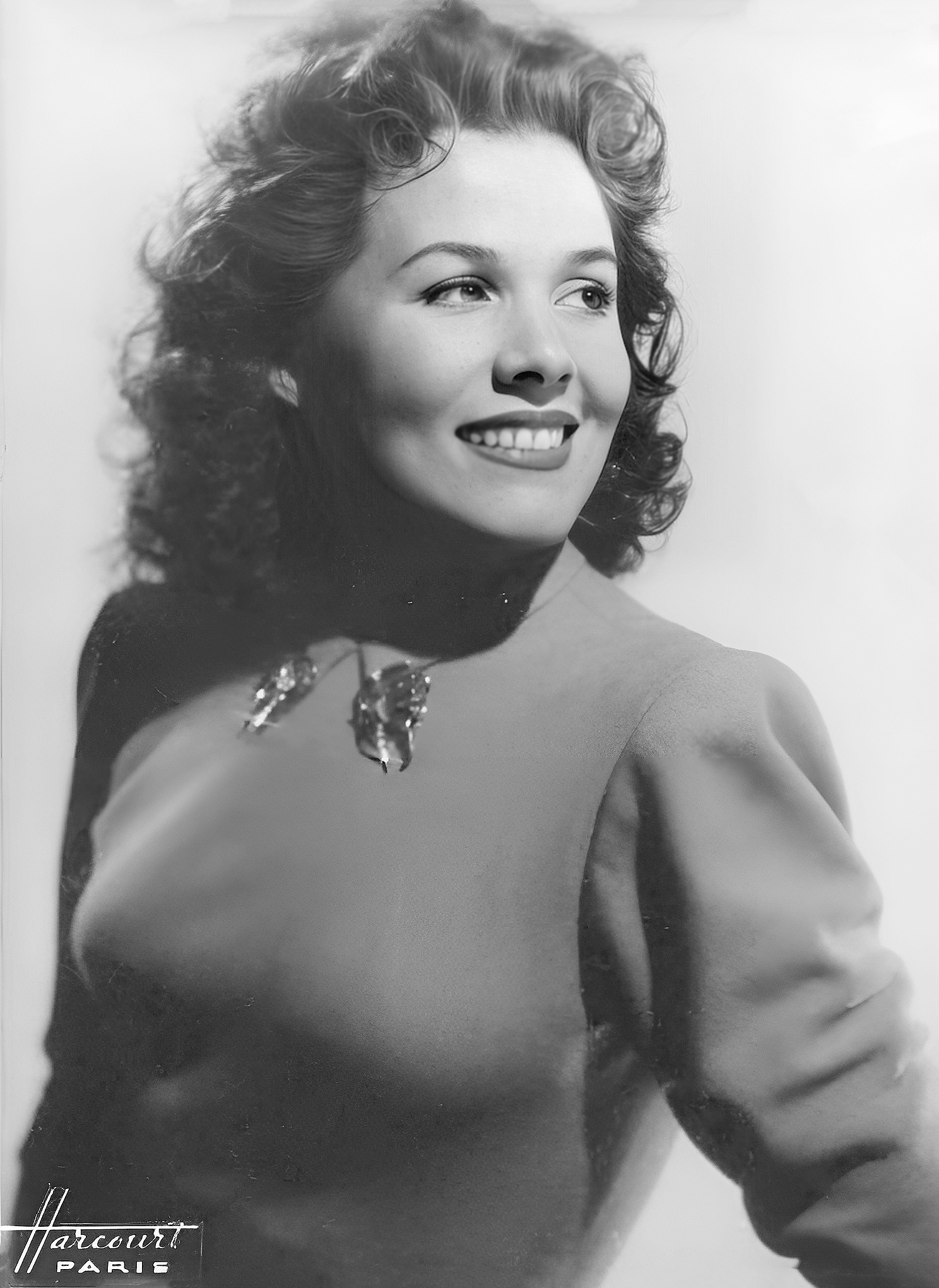
- Jeannette Batti in 1950
- Born: 1921
- Died: 2011 (aged 89–90)
- Occupation: Actress

Jeannette Batti (1921–2011) was a French film actress.

== Partial filmography ==
- Shop Girls of Paris (1943) - Une vendeuse (uncredited)
- Le Roi des resquilleurs (1945) - Lulu
- Back Streets of Paris (1946) - Mona
- One Night at the Tabarin (1947) - Jeannette
- Mademoiselle Has Fun (1948) - Fifi
- Eternal Conflict (1948) - Janette
- To the Eyes of Memory (1948) - Ketty
- Jean de la Lune (1949) - Mlle Rolande
- The Chocolate Girl (1949) - Rosette
- Amédée (1950) - Jacqueline
- Voyage for Three (1950) - Huguette
- Moumou (1951) - Claudine
- Paris Is Always Paris (1951) - Claudia
- Nous irons à Monte-Carlo (1951) - Marinette
- Henriette (1952) - Gisèle
- A Hundred Francs a Second (1953) - Louloute
- L'étrange amazone (1953) - Olga
- Une nuit à Megève (1953) - Georgette
- Les détectives du dimanche (1953) - Isabelle
- L'oeil en coulisses (1953) - Martine Cairolle
- Soirs de Paris (1954) - Roxy
- J'y suis... j'y reste (1954) - Lucie
- Trois de la Canebière (1956) - Margot
- Coup dur chez les mous (1956) - Gigi
- Les carottes sont cuites (1956)
- La Traversée de Paris (1956) - Mariette Martin
- L'auberge en folie (1957) - Gloria Royal
- Three Sailors (1957) - Angèle
- The Pirates of the Mississippi (1963) - Mrs. Bridleford
- Queste pazze pazze donne (1964) - Marisa - the Commendatore's wife ('La garçonnière') (uncredited)
- Jealous as a Tiger (1964) - Dame Toilette
- Les gros malins (1969) - La comtesse
- Le clair de terre (1970)
- Les joyeux lurons (1972) - La patronne de boîte
- Sacrés gendarmes (1980) - L'épiciére
- La nuit de la mort! (1980) - Marie-Madeleine
- Touch' pas à mon biniou (1980) - La femme d'Henri
- Santa Claus Is a Stinker (1982)
