= Robert Mawdesley =

English actor

Robert Mawdesley (c. 1900 – 30 September 1953) was an English actor, best remembered as the first voice of Walter Gabriel in the long-running radio programme The Archers, which has been running as a daily serial on BBC Radio since 1 January 1951.

Mawdesley was educated at Gresham's School, Holt, Norfolk, where he was a keen actor in school plays. Although he had a part in Basil Dean's movie Loyalties (1933), almost all of his work was on stage until he joined The Archers in 1951. Mawdesley's character in the programme, Walter Gabriel, was an Ambridge smallholder who provided most of the comic relief with the catch-phrase "My old pal, my old beauty" and other comments.

== Selected filmography ==
- Loyalties (1933)
