= The Treasure of Bengal =

- Directed by: Gianni Vernuccio
- Written by: Gian Paolo Callegari; Piero De Bernardi
- Story by: Omar Salgari
- Produced by: Giorgio Venturini
- Starring: Sabu; Luisella Boni
- Cinematography: Renato Del Frate
- Music by: Italo Delle Case
- Production companies: Produzione Venturini; Synimex
- Distributed by: Venturini Film (Italy); CCF (France)
- Release date: 18 December 1953
- Language: Italian

The Treasure of Bengal (Italian: Il tesoro del Bengala, French: Le trésor du Bengale) is a 1953 Italian-French adventure film directed by Gianni Vernuccio and starring Sabu. It is based on a novel by Emilio Salgari.

== Cast ==
- Sabu as Ainur
- Luisella Boni as Karma
- Luigi Tosi as Don Fernando
- Georges Poujouly as Tomby
- Carla Calò as Surama
- Anand Kumar as Uzake
- Manuel Serrano as Burka
- Pamela Palma as The Dancer
- Nino Marchetti
