= The Man from Cairo =

1953 film by Ray Enright

- Directed by: Ray H. Enright
- Screenplay by: Eugene Ling; Phillip Stevens; Janice Stevens
- Based on: From a story by Ladislas Fodor
- Produced by: Bernard Luber
- Starring: George Raft; Gianna Maria Canale; Massimo Serato; Guido Celano
- Cinematography: Mario Albertelli A.I.C.
- Edited by: Mario Serandrei
- Music by: Renzo Rossellini
- Production company: Michael David Productions Inc.
- Distributed by: Eros Films (UK); Lippert Pictures Inc.
- Release date: 27 November 1953
- Countries: United Kingdom; Italy; United States
- Language: English
- Budget: $235,000

The Man from Cairo is a 1953 British/Italian/American international coproduction film noir starring George Raft. Released in Italy as Italian: Dramma nella Kasbah/Avventura ad Algeri, it also went under the alternative English titles Cairo Incident, Adventure in Algiers and Secrets of the Casbah.

== Plot ==
The French government is investigating the location of bullion stolen during World War 2, the gold reserves of the Free French transported to Algeria in 1940. One consignment worth $100 million, had been ambushed, the only survivor being General Dumont, who escaped before he could be tried. Five agents who attempt to find the hoard are later murdered. Therefore an American agent, Charles Stark, is called in and, while passing through Cairo in order to establish his cover story, runs into his friend Mike Canelli, an ex-serviceman who had served in Algeria for three months in 1942.

Canelli continues on to Algiers and is drugged while visiting the room of a night club dancer. Nearly arrested for her subsequent murder, he is only released when the singer's friend, Lorraine Beloyan, fails to identify him as the visitor. Afterwards the two fall in love and arouse the suspicion of the gang of thieves while trying to solve the crime themselves. The climax comes when Lorraine is kidnapped and taken on board a freight train, from which Canelli rescues her while the police, led by the disguised Dumont, intercept the train, arrest the criminals and retrieve the stolen money.

As Charles Stark arrives at the airport in Algiers to complete his assignment, Canelli is departing with Lorraine and hands his friend a newspaper with the headline reporting that an American tourist has already solved the mystery.

== Cast ==
- George Raft as Mike Canelli
- Gianna Maria Canale as Lorraine Belogne
- Massimo Serato as Basil Constantine
- Guido Celano as Sgt. Emile Touchard
- Irene Papas as Yvonne Le Beaux
- Alfredo Varelli as General Dumont, also known as Professor Crespi
- Leon Lenoir as Capt. Akhim Bey
- Mino Doro as Major Le Blanc, assumed name of Emile Moreau
- Angelo Dessy as Pockmark
- Leslie Daniels as Colonel Fournier
- Richard Mc Namara as Charles Stark
- Franco Silva as Armeno
- Henry Vidon
- Charles Fernley Fawcett as police prefect Pierre de Montfort (uncredited)

== Production ==
The film was produced by Bernard Luber, who had just made Loan Shark with Raft. It was shot on location in Algeria and Italy and was made for $155,000, with $80,000 in deferrals. Leading lady Gianna Maria Canale, a previous runner-up in the 1947 Miss Italy competition, had the distinction of the largest age gap between Raft and one of his leading ladies.

== Reception ==
In a contemporary review for The New York Times, Howard Thompson found the film to be formulaic though having "a sleazy, authentic-looking backdrop." In his view it was "lethargically directed by Ray H. Enright, [where] the action soon levels off to a dull, unsurprising trot." As for the acting, "Mr. Raft is…still the same competent, brisk and unimaginative performer [and] the rest go through their assigned motions. It takes all of them a long time." A later critic concurs that the plot is dull and Raft comes over as "a tired, bored and boring hero".
