= 2008 in Brazil =

Events from the year 2008 in Brazil.

== Incumbents ==
=== Federal government ===
- President: Luiz Inácio Lula da Silva
- Vice President: José Alencar Gomes da Silva

=== Governors ===
- Acre: Binho Marques
- Alagoas: Teotônio Vilela Filho
- Amapa: Waldez Góes
- Amazonas: Eduardo Braga
- Bahia: Jaques Wagner
- Ceará: Cid Gomes
- Espírito Santo: Paulo Hartung
- Goiás: Alcides Rodrigues
- Maranhão: Jackson Lago
- Mato Grosso: Blairo Maggi
- Mato Grosso do Sul: André Puccinelli
- Minas Gerais: Aécio Neves
- Pará: Ana Júlia Carepa
- Paraíba: Cássio Cunha Lima
- Parana: Roberto Requião de Mello e Silva
- Pernambuco: Eduardo Campos
- Piauí: Wellington Dias
- Rio de Janeiro: Sérgio Cabral Filho
- Rio Grande do Norte: Wilma Maria de Faria
- Rio Grande do Sul: Yeda Rorato Crusius
- Rondônia: Ivo Narciso Cassol
- Roraima: José de Anchieta Júnior
- Santa Catarina: Luiz Henrique da Silveira
- São Paulo: José Serra
- Sergipe: Marcelo Déda
- Tocantins: Marcelo Miranda

=== Vice governors ===
- Acre: Carlos César Correia de Messias
- Alagoas: José Wanderley Neto
- Amapá: Pedro Paulo Dias de Carvalho
- Amazonas: Omar José Abdel Aziz
- Bahia: Edmundo Pereira Santos
- Ceará: Francisco José Pinheiro
- Espírito Santo: Ricardo de Rezende Ferraço
- Goiás: Ademir de Oliveira Meneses
- Maranhão: Luís Carlos Porto
- Mato Grosso: Silval da Cunha Barbosa
- Mato Grosso do Sul: Murilo Zauith
- Minas Gerais: Antonio Augusto Junho Anastasia
- Pará: Odair Santos Corrêa
- Paraíba: José Lacerda Neto
- Paraná: Orlando Pessuti
- Pernambuco: João Soares Lyra Neto
- Piauí: Wilson Martins
- Rio de Janeiro: Luiz Fernando Pezão
- Rio Grande do Norte: Iberê Ferreira
- Rio Grande do Sul: Paulo Afonso Girardi Feijó
- Rondônia: João Aparecido Cahulla
- Roraima: Vacant
- Santa Catarina: Leonel Pavan
- São Paulo: Alberto Goldman
- Sergipe: Belivaldo Chagas Silva
- Tocantins: Paulo Sidnei Antunes

== Events ==
=== January ===
- January 8: The paintings Portrait of Suzanne Bloch by Pablo Picasso and O Lavrador de Café by Cândido Portinari are recovered, after being stolen from the São Paulo Museum of Art.
- January 22: Enoteca Saint VinSaint, the first natural wine bar in Brazil and Latin America, is founded in São Paulo.

=== March ===
- March 29: Five-year old Isabella Nardoni dies from severe injuries after being thrown out of the sixth floor of a building in São Paulo. This would be one of the most infamous infanticide cases in Brazil.

=== April ===
- April 1: Colombian mega-trafficker Juan Carlos Ramírez Abadía is sentenced to 30 years and five months in prison by the Brazilian Federal Court.
- April 4: Killing of Rachel Genofre in Curitiba, Paraná. It would be more than 11 years before authorities would fin Carlos Eduardo dos Santos responsible for the 9-year-old's murder.
- April 20: Priest Adelir Antônio de Carli disappears after taking off in a chair attached to a thousand helium balloons, in Paranaguá, Paraná. The priest's remains were found two months later in the Atlantic Ocean, about 62 mi from Macaé, on the coast of Rio de Janeiro, by a tugboat that provided services to Petrobras.
- April 22: An earthquake of a 5.2 magnitude on the Richter scale, with an epicenter in the ocean, is felt in the city of São Paulo and four other Brazilian states.

=== June ===
- June 12: Art works by Lasar Segall, Di Cavalcanti, and Pablo Picasso are stolen from the Pinacoteca art museum in São Paulo by three armed men.

=== October ===
- October 13 - 17: A 15-year-old girl named Eloá Cristina Pimentel is kidnapped, held hostage, and later murdered by her ex-boyfriend. This would be the longest hostage crisis in the state of São Paulo's history. The São Paulo police are heavily criticized for their handling of the crisis.

=== November ===
- November 2: Lewis Hamilton finishes 5th at the Brazilian Grand Prix to win the 2008 Formula One Drivers' Championship, beating Felipe Massa who won the race by 1 point. Scuderia Ferrari however secured the Constructors' Championship.
- November 3: Banks Itaú and Unibanco merge into Itaú Unibanco.

== Deaths ==
=== January ===
- January 9: Carmine Furletti president of Cruzeiro (b. 1926)
- January 21: Luiz Carlos Tourinho, actor (b. 1964)
- January 22: Dora Bria, windsurfing champion (b. 1958)

=== February ===
- February 1:
  - Hélio Quaglia Barbosa, member of the Superior Court of Justice (b. 1941)
  - Beto Carrero, theme park owner and entertainer (b. 1937)
- February 22:
  - Rubens de Falco, telenovela actor (b. 1931)
  - Oswaldo Louzada, actor (b. 1912)

=== March ===
- March 1: Haroldo de Andrade, radio presenter (b. 1934)
- March 29: Isabella Nardoni, murder victim (b. 2002)

=== April ===
- April 21: Carmen Silva, actress (b. 1916)

=== May ===
- May 17: Zélia Gattai, writer and wife of Jorge Amado (b. 1916)

=== June ===
- June 14: Jamelão, samba singer (b. 1913)
- June 24: Ruth Cardoso, anthropologist, educator and public figure (b. 1930)

=== July ===
- July 11: Breno Mello, footballer and actor (b. 1931)
- July 19: Dercy Gonçalves, comedian (b. 1907)

=== August ===
- August 16: Dorival Caymmi, singer and songwriter (b. 1914)

=== September ===
- September 4:
  - Waldick Soriano, singer and songwriter (b. 1933)
  - Fernando Torres, actor and voice-over artist (b. 1927)

=== October ===
- October 19: Arthur Sendas, business magnate (b. 1935)

=== November ===
- November 3: Lhofei Shiozawa, judoka (b. 1941)

=== December ===
- December 25: Olívio Aurélio Fazza, Roman Catholic prelate and bishop of the Diocese of Foz do Iguaçu (b. 1925)

== See also ==
- 2008 in Brazilian football
- 2008 in Brazilian television
- List of Brazilian films of 2008
