= 1853 =

1853 in various calendars
- Gregorian calendar: 1853; MDCCCLIII
- Ab urbe condita: 2606
- Armenian calendar: 1302; ԹՎ ՌՅԲ
- Assyrian calendar: 6603
- Baháʼí calendar: 9–10
- Balinese saka calendar: 1774–1775
- Bengali calendar: 1259–1260
- Berber calendar: 2803
- British Regnal year: 16 Vict. 1 – 17 Vict. 1
- Buddhist calendar: 2397
- Burmese calendar: 1215
- Byzantine calendar: 7361–7362
- Chinese calendar: 壬子年 (Water Rat); 4550 or 4343 — to — 癸丑年 (Water Ox); 4551 or 4344
- Coptic calendar: 1569–1570
- Discordian calendar: 3019
- Ethiopian calendar: 1845–1846
- Hebrew calendar: 5613–5614
- Hindu calendars
- Vikram Samvat: 1909–1910
- Shaka Samvat: 1774–1775
- Kali Yuga: 4953–4954
- Holocene calendar: 11853
- Igbo calendar: 853–854
- Iranian calendar: 1231–1232
- Islamic calendar: 1269–1270
- Japanese calendar: Kaei 6 (嘉永６年)
- Javanese calendar: 1781–1782
- Julian calendar: Gregorian minus 12 days
- Korean calendar: 4186
- Minguo calendar: 59 before ROC 民前59年
- Nanakshahi calendar: 385
- Thai solar calendar: 2395–2396
- Tibetan calendar: ཆུ་ཕོ་བྱི་བ་ལོ་ (male Water-Rat); 1979 or 1598 or 826 — to — ཆུ་མོ་གླང་ལོ་ (female Water-Ox); 1980 or 1599 or 827

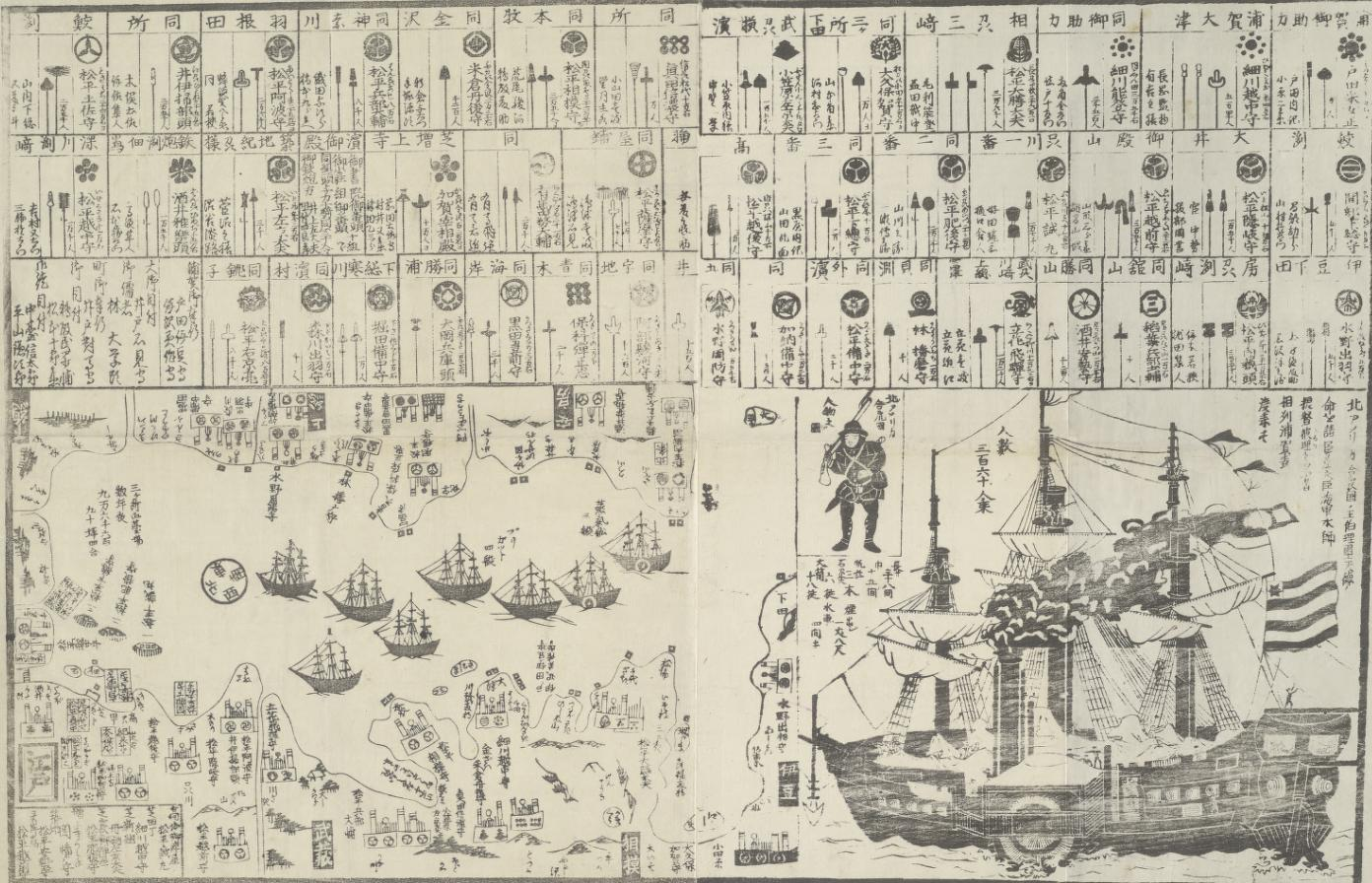
July 14: Japan welcomes the first U.S. envoys from the Perry Expedition, begins to end isolation.

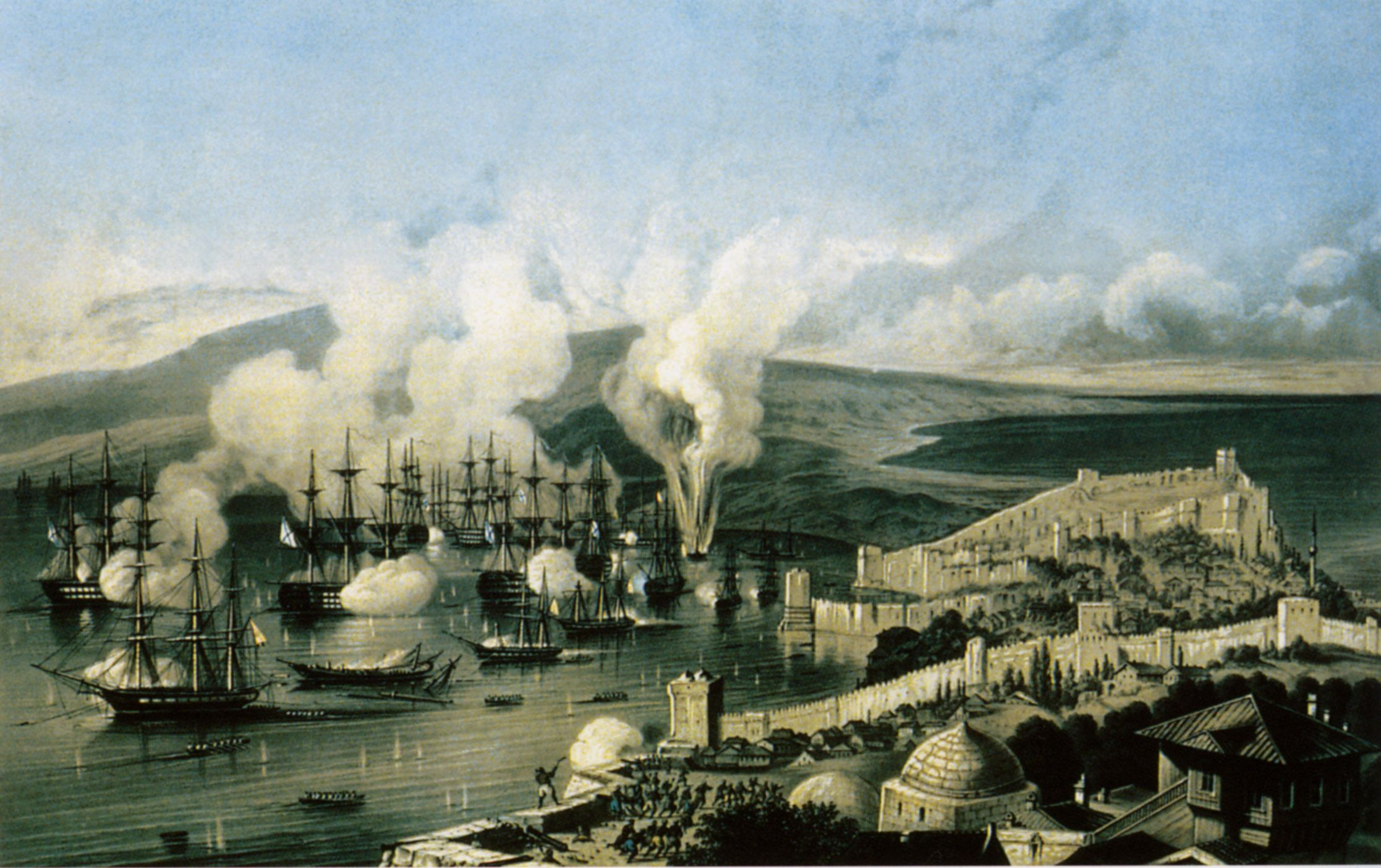
November 30 (November 18 O.S.): The Battle of Sinop is fought in the Crimean War as the Russian Empire destroys the Ottoman Turkish fleet in the last major naval battle involving sailing warships.

1853 (MDCCCLIII) was a common year starting on Saturday of the Gregorian calendar and a common year starting on Thursday of the Julian calendar, the 1853rd year of the Common Era (CE) and Anno Domini (AD) designations, the 853rd year of the 2nd millennium, the 53rd year of the 19th century, and the 4th year of the 1850s decade. As of the start of 1853, the Gregorian calendar was 12 days ahead of the Julian calendar, which remained in localized use until 1923.

== Events ==
=== January–March ===
- January 6
  - Florida Governor Thomas Brown signs legislation that provides public support for the new East Florida Seminary, leading to the establishment of the University of Florida.
  - U.S. President-elect Franklin Pierce's only living child, Benjamin "Benny" Pierce, is killed in a train accident.
- January 8 – Taiping Rebellion: Zeng Guofan is ordered to assist the governor of Hunan in organizing a militia force to search for local bandits.
- January 12 – Taiping Rebellion: The Taiping army occupies Wuchang.
- January 19 – Giuseppe Verdi's opera Il Trovatore premieres at Teatro Apollo in Rome.
- January 20 – The United Kingdom proclaims its annexation of Lower Burma, ending the Second Anglo-Burmese War.
- February 10 – Taiping Rebellion: Taiping forces assemble at Hanyang, Hankou and Wuchang for the march on Nanjing.
- February 12 – The city of Puerto Montt is founded in the Reloncaví Sound, Chile.
- February 22 – Washington University in St. Louis is founded as Eliot Seminary.
- March 5 – Saint Paul Fire and Marine, as predecessor of The Travelers Companies, a worldwide insurance service, founded in Minnesota, United States.
- March 6 – Giuseppe Verdi's opera La traviata premieres at La Fenice in Venice, but is poorly received at this time.
- March 20 – Taiping Rebellion: A rebel army of around 750,000 seizes Nanjing, killing 30,000 Imperial troops.
- March 29 – Manchester is granted city status in the United Kingdom.
- March – The clothing company Levi Strauss & Co. is founded in San Francisco (US).

=== April–June ===
- April 7 – Prince Leopold, the youngest son and the eighth child of Queen Victoria and Prince Albert, is born in Buckingham Palace; he has inherited haemophilia. During the labour, Victoria chooses to use chloroform, thereby encouraging the use of anesthesia in childbirth.
- April 16 – Indian Railways: The first passenger railway in India opens from Bombay to Thana, Maharashtra, 22 miles (35 km).
- May 5 – Perpetual Maritime Truce comes into force between the United Kingdom and the rulers of the Sheikhdoms of the Lower Gulf, later known as the Trucial States.
- May 12–October 31 – The Great Industrial Exhibition is held in Dublin, Ireland.
- May 23 – The first plat for Seattle, Washington, is laid out.
- May
  - The world's first public aquarium opens, as a feature of the London Zoo.
  - An outbreak of yellow fever kills 7,790 people in New Orleans.
  - Isambard Kingdom Brunel accepts John Scott Russell's tender for construction of the SS Great Eastern passenger steamer.
- June 22 – Guimarães is elevated to city status by Queen Maria II of Portugal.
- June 27 – Taiping Rebellion: The Northern Expeditionary Force crosses the Yellow River.
- June 30 – Georges-Eugène Haussmann is selected as préfect of the Seine (department) to begin the re-planning of Paris.

=== July–September ===
- July 1 – The Swiss watch company Tissot is founded.
- July 8 – U.S. Commodore Matthew C. Perry arrives in Edo Bay, Japan, with a request for a trade treaty.
- July 14 – Japan allows Commodore Perry to come ashore and begin negotiations.
- July 25 – Outlaw and bandit Joaquin Murrieta is killed in California.
- July 27 – Iesada succeeds his father Ieyoshi as Japanese shōgun. The Late Tokugawa shogunate (the last part of the Edo period in Japan) begins.
- August 12 – New Zealand acquires self-government.
- August 23 – The first true International Meteorological Organization is established in Brussels, Belgium.
- August 24
  - Potato chips are first prepared, by George Crum at Saratoga Springs, New York, according to popular accounts.
  - The Royal Norwegian Navy Museum is founded at Karljohansvern in Horten, perhaps the world's first naval museum.
- September 19 – English missionary Hudson Taylor first leaves for China.
- September 20 – Otis Elevator, as predecessor of Otis Worldwide, is founded in the United States.

=== October–December ===
- October 1 – C. Bechstein's piano factory is founded, one of three established in a "golden year" in the history of the piano (Julius Blüthner and Steinway & Sons being the others).
- October 4–5 – Crimean War: The Ottoman Empire begins war with Russia.
- October 4 – On the east coast of the United States, Donald McKay launches the Great Republic, the world's biggest sailing ship, which at 4,500 tons is too large to be successful.
- October 25 – In Munich, the art museum Neue Pinakothek opens.
- October 28 – Crimean War: The Ottoman army crosses the Danube into Vidin/Calafat, Wallachia.
- October 30 – Taiping Rebellion: The Taiping Northern Expeditionary Force comes within 3 miles (4.8 km) of Tianjin.
- November 3 – Troops of William Walker capture La Paz in Baja California Territory and declare the (short-lived) Republic of Sonora.
- November 4 – Crimean War: Battle of Oltenitza – Turkish forces defeat the Russians.
- November 15 – Maria II of Portugal is succeeded by her son Pedro V as King of Portugal.
- November 30 (November 18 O.S.) – Crimean War: Battle of Sinop – The Russian fleet destroys the Turkish fleet.
- December 6 – Taiping Rebellion: French minister de Bourboulon arrives at the Heavenly Capital, aboard the Cassini.
- December 14 – Compagnie Générale des Eaux, predecessor of Vivendi and Veolia, a global media conglomerate, is founded in Paris, France.
- December 30 – Gadsden Purchase: The United States buys approximately 77,000 square kilometres (30,000 sq mi) of land from Mexico to facilitate railroad building in the Southwest.

=== Date unknown ===
- French diplomat Arthur de Gobineau begins publication of his An Essay on the Inequality of the Human Races (Essai sur l'inégalité des races humaines), an early example of scientific racism.
- Charles Pravaz and Alexander Wood independently invent a practical hypodermic syringe.
- Wheaton Academy is founded as an evangelical high school in West Chicago, Illinois.
- The Chartered Bank of India, Australia and China is incorporated in London by Scotsman James Wilson, under a Royal Charter from Queen Victoria.
- Melbourne Cricket Ground, the largest sports stadium in the Southern Hemisphere, officially opens.
- 1853–1873 – More than 130,000 Chinese laborers come to Cuba.

== Births ==
=== January–March ===
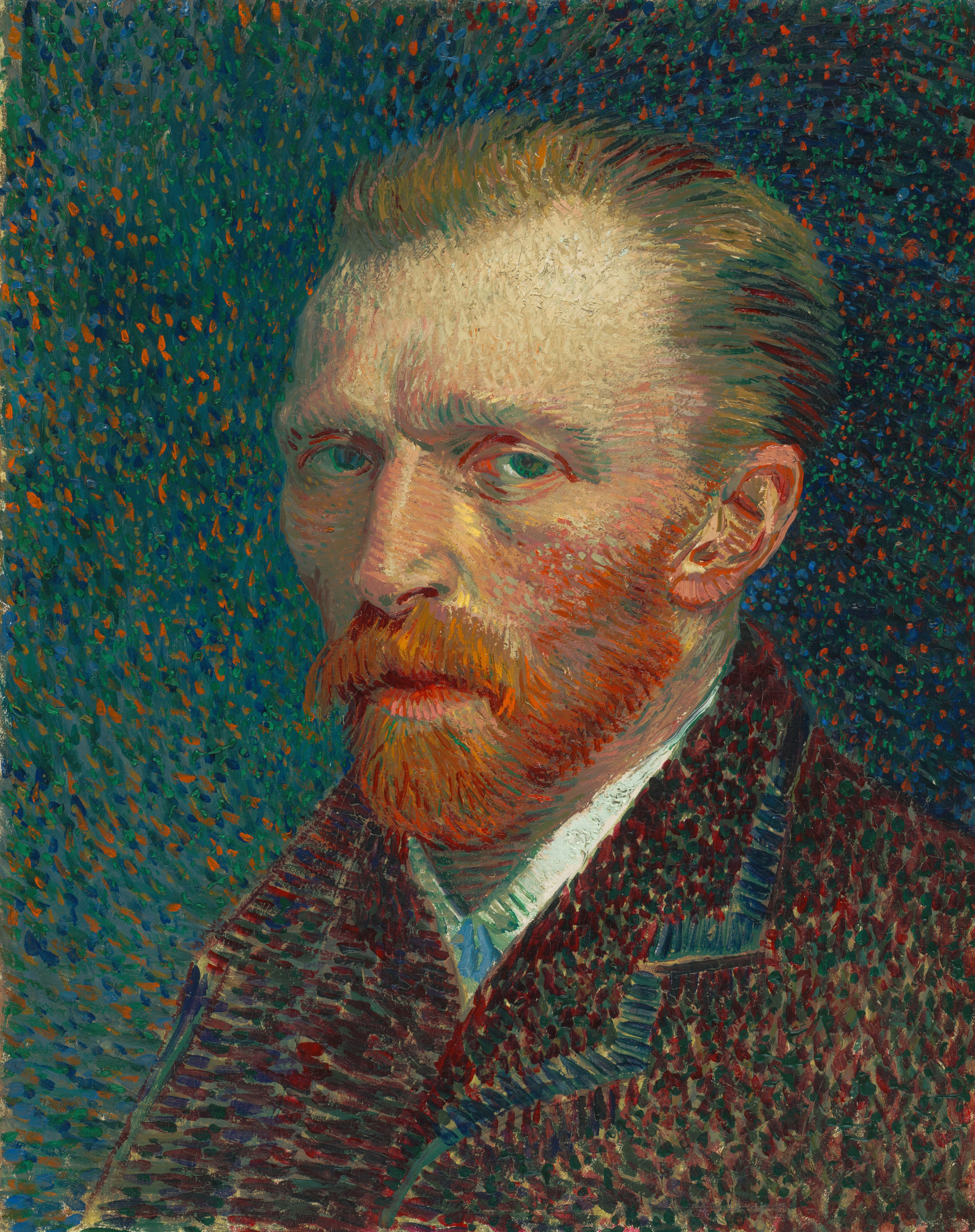
Vincent van Gogh

- January 1 – Karl von Einem, German general (d. 1934)
- January 9 – Henning von Holtzendorff, German admiral (d. 1919)
- January 16
  - Johnston Forbes-Robertson, English actor (d. 1937)
  - Sir Ian Hamilton, British general (d. 1947)
- January 18 – Eusebio Hernández Pérez, Cuban eugenicist, obstetrician and guerrilla (d. 1933)
- January 23 – John Marks Moore, American politician (d. 1902)
- January 28
  - José Martí, Cuban revolutionary (d. 1895)
  - Vladimir Solovyov, Russian philosopher (d. 1900)
- c. February – William O'Malley, Irish politician (d. 1939)
- January 29 – Kitasato Shibasaburō, Japanese physician, bacteriologist (d. 1931)
- February 4 – Kaneko Kentarō, Japanese politician, diplomat (d. 1942)
- February 18 – Ernest Fenollosa, Catalan-American philosopher (d. 1908)
- February 22 – Annie Le Porte Diggs, Canadian-born state librarian of Kansas (d. 1916)
- March 2 – Ella Loraine Dorsey, American author, journalist and translator (d. 1935)
- March 5 – Howard Pyle, American artist, fiction writer (d. 1911)
- March 10 – Thomas Mackenzie, 18th Prime Minister of New Zealand (d. 1930)
- March 13 – Robert William Felkin, British writer (d. 1926)
- March 14 – Ferdinand Hodler, Swiss painter (d. 1918)
- March 25 – Mozaffar ad-Din Shah Qajar, 5th Qajarid Shah of Persia (d. 1907)
- March 27 – Yakov Zhilinsky, Russian general (d. 1918)
- March 29 – Elihu Thomson, English-American engineer, inventor, co-founder of General Electric (d. 1937)
- March 30 – Vincent van Gogh, Dutch painter (d. 1890)

=== April–June ===
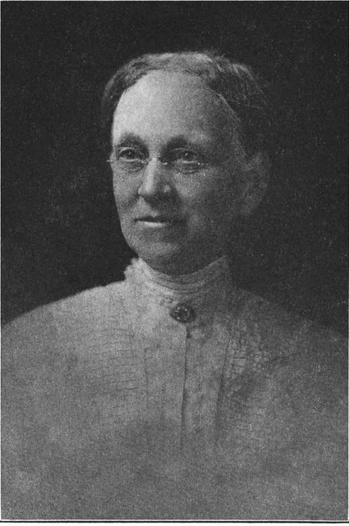
Ella Eaton Kellogg

- April 6 – Emil Jellinek, German automobile entrepreneur (d. 1918)
- April 7
  - Ella Eaton Kellogg, American pioneer in dietetics (d. 1920)
  - Prince Leopold, Duke of Albany, member of the British royal family (d. 1884)
- April 22 – Alphonse Bertillon, French police officer, forensic scientist (d. 1914)
- April 30 – Alexey Abaza, Russian admiral and politician (d. 1917)
- May 4 – Marie Robinson Wright, American travel writer (d. 1914)
- May 20
  - Ella Hoag Brockway Avann, American educator (d. 1899)
  - Vladimir Viktorovich Sakharov, Russian general (d. 1920)
- May 26 - Placido Moreira Dias, Brazilian military commander (d. ?)
- May 28 – Carl Larsson, Swedish painter (d. 1919)
- June 3 – William Flinders Petrie, English Egyptologist (d. 1942)
- June 12 – Chester Adgate Congdon, American mining magnate (d. 1916)

=== July–September ===
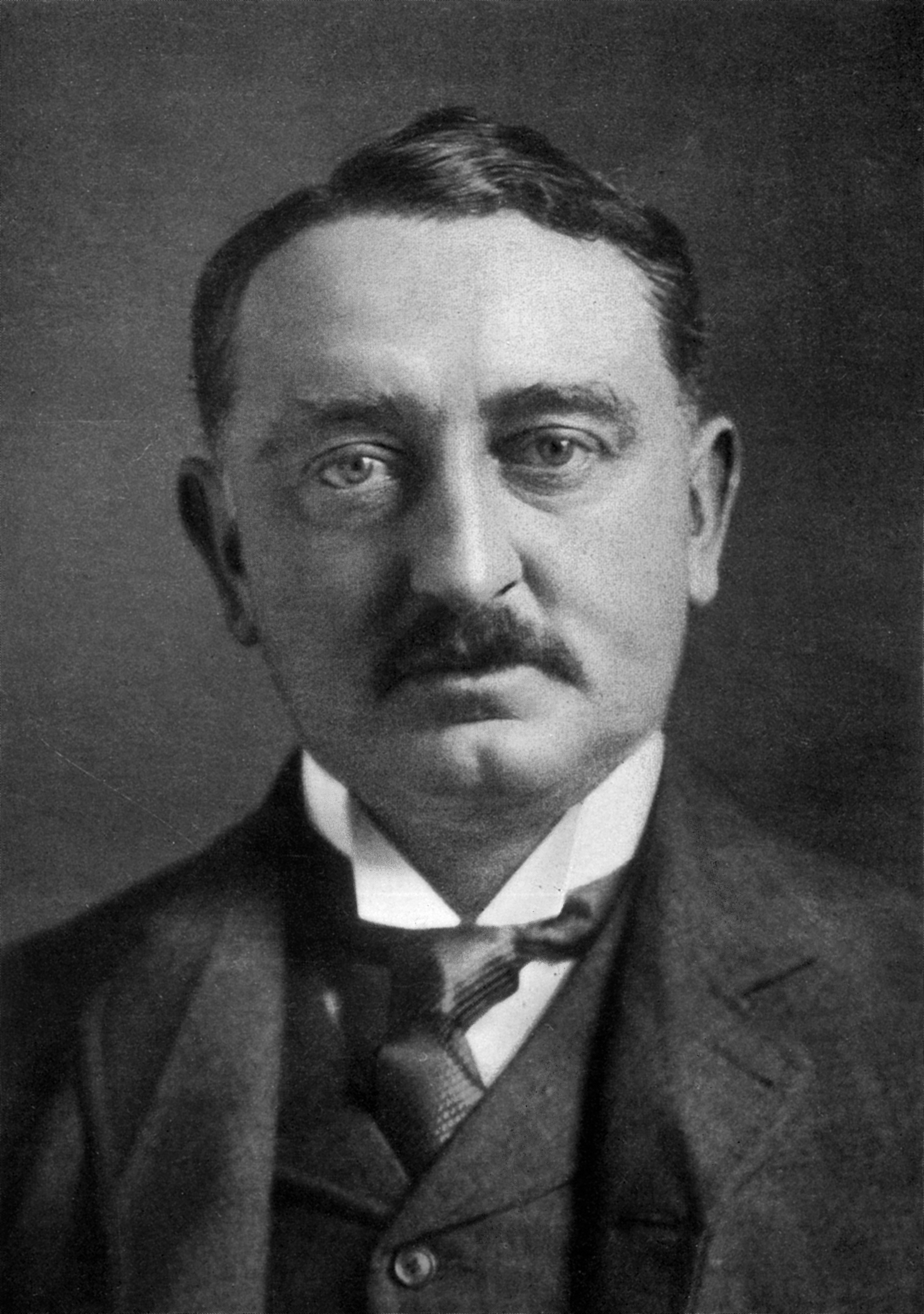
Cecil Rhodes

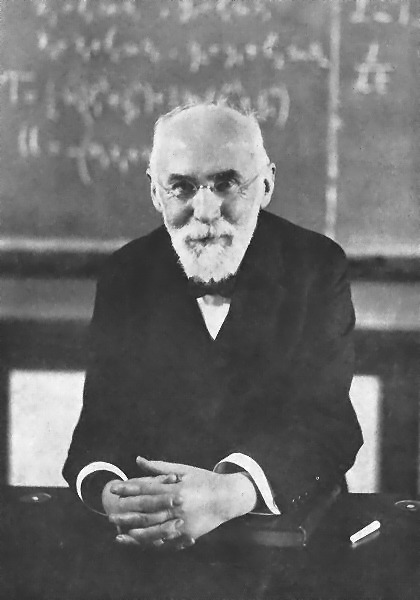
Hendrik Lorentz

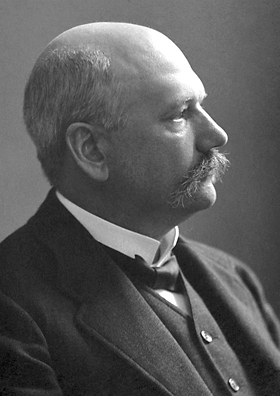
Albrecht Kossel

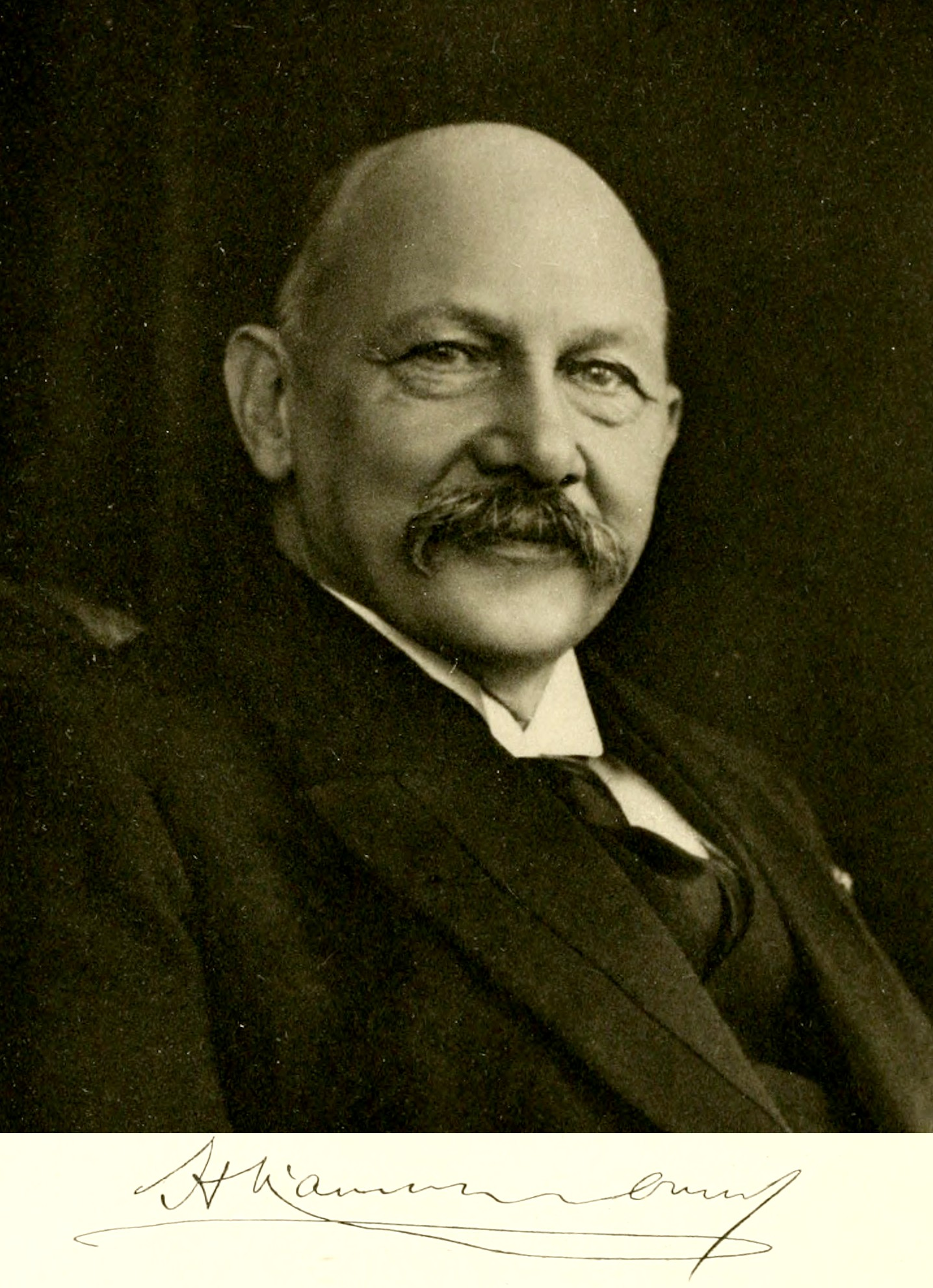
Heike Kamerlingh Onnes

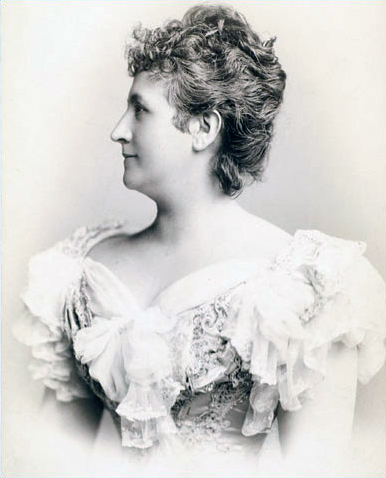
Teresa Carreño

- July 4 – Ernst Otto Beckmann, German chemist (d. 1923)
- July 5 – Cecil Rhodes, English businessman (d. 1902)
- July 10 – Percy Scott, British admiral (d. 1924)
- July 18 – Hendrik Lorentz, Dutch physicist, Nobel Prize laureate (d. 1928)
- July 24 – William Gillette, American actor, playwright and stage-manager (d. 1937)
- July 26 – Philip Cowen, American Jewish publisher and author (d. 1943)
- July 29 – Ioan Culcer, Romanian general and politician (d. 1928)
- August 23
  - João Marques de Oliveira, Portuguese painter (d. 1927)
  - John Thomson, Australian politician (d. 1917)
- August 28
  - Vladimir Shukhov, Russian engineer, polymath, scientist and architect (d. 1939)
  - Franz I, Prince of Liechtenstein (d. 1938)
- September 1 – Aleksei Brusilov, Russian general (d. 1926)
- September 2 – Wilhelm Ostwald, German chemist, Nobel Prize laureate (d. 1932)
- September 6 – Katherine Eleanor Conway, American journalist, editor, poet and Laetare Medalist (d. 1927)
- September 16 – Albrecht Kossel, German physician, recipient of the Nobel Prize in Physiology or Medicine (d. 1927)
- September 20 – Chulalongkorn, Rama V, King of Siam (d. 1910)
- September 21 – Heike Kamerlingh Onnes, Dutch physicist, Nobel Prize laureate (d. 1926)
- September 23 – Fritz von Below, German general (d. 1918)

=== October–December ===
- October 4 – Jane Maria Read, American poet and teacher (unknown year of death)
- October 13 – Lillie Langtry, Jersey-born stage actress and royal mistress (d. 1929)
- October 14 – John William Kendrick, American railroad executive (d. 1924)
- October 16 – Thadeus von Sivers, Baltic German-born Russian general (death date unknown)
- October 17 – Grand Duchess Maria Alexandrovna of Russia, wife of Prince Alfred, Duke of Edinburgh (d. 1920)
- October 26 – Tokugawa Akitake, Japanese daimyō, the last lord of Mito Domain, younger brother of the last shōgun Tokugawa Yoshinobu (d. 1910)
- October 30 – Louise Abbéma, French painter, sculptor and designer of the Belle Époque (d. 1927)
- November 9 – Stanford White, American architect (d. 1906)
- November 13 – John Drew, Jr., American stage actor (d. 1927)
- November 18 – Leopold Poetsch, Austrian history teacher, high school teacher of Adolf Hitler and Adolf Eichmann (d. 1942)
- November 20 – Oskar Potiorek, Austro-Hungarian general (d. 1933)
- November 29 – Panagiotis Danglis, Greek general, politician (d. 1924)
- December 6 – Hara Prasad Shastri, Indian academic, Sanskrit scholar, archivist and historian of Bengali literature (d. 1931)
- December 14 – Errico Malatesta, Italian anarchist (d. 1932)
- December 17 – Émile Roux, French physician, bacteriologist and immunologist (d. 1933)
- December 21 – Noda Utarō, Japanese entrepreneur and politician (d. 1927)
- December 22
  - Teresa Carreño, Venezuelan pianist, singer, composer and conductor (d. 1917)
  - Sarada Devi, Indian mystic and saint (d. 1920)
- December 23 – William Henry Moody, 35th United States Secretary of the Navy, 45th United States Attorney General and Associate Justice of the Supreme Court of the United States (d. 1917)
- December 31 – Tasker H. Bliss, American general (d. 1930)

== Deaths ==
=== January–June ===
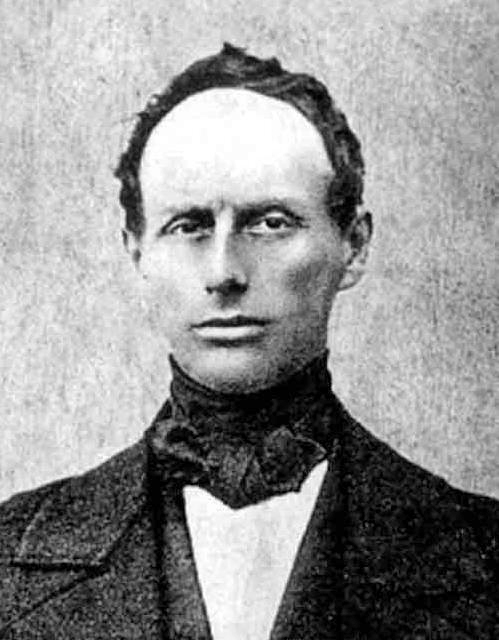
Christian Doppler

- January 8 – Mihály Bertalanits, Slovene (Prekmurje Slovene) poet in the Kingdom of Hungary (b. 1788)
- January 16
  - Matteo Carcassi, Italian composer (b. 1792)
  - Archduke Rainer Joseph of Austria, Archduke of Austria, Prince Royal of Hungary and Bohemia (b. 1783)
  - Robert Lucas, governor of Ohio, United States (b. 1781)
- January 19 – Karl Faber, German historian (b. 1773)
- January 22 – Méry von Bruiningk, Estonian democrat (b. 1818)
- February 4 – Princess Maria Amélia of Brazil, daughter of Emperor Pedro I of Brazil (b. 1831)
- February 6 – Anastasio Bustamante, 4th President of Mexico (b. 1780)
- February 15 – August, Prince of Hohenlohe-Öhringen (b. 1784)
- March 17 – Christian Doppler, Austrian mathematician (b. 1803)
- March 30 – Abigail Fillmore, First Lady of the United States (b. 1798)
- April 18 – William R. King, 13th Vice President of the United States (b. 1786)
- April 28 – Ludwig Tieck, German writer (b. 1773)
- May 18 – Lionel Kieseritzky, Baltic-German chess player (b. 1806)
- June 2
  - Lucas Alamán, Mexican statesman, historian (b. 1792)
  - Henry Trevor, 21st Baron Dacre, British peer, soldier (b. 1777)
- June 7 – Giuseppina Ronzi de Begnis, Italian opera singer (b. 1800)
- June 8 – Howard Vyse, English soldier and Egyptologist (b. 1784)
- June 27 – Lewis Brian Adams, English painter (b. 1809)

=== July–December ===
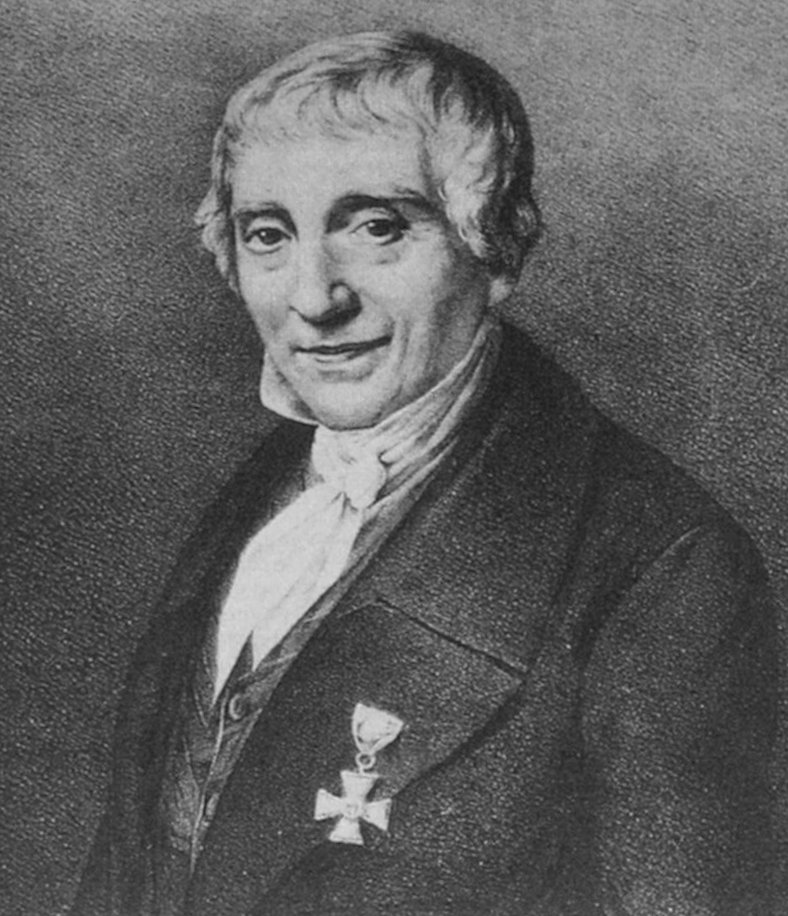
Georg Friedrich Grotefend

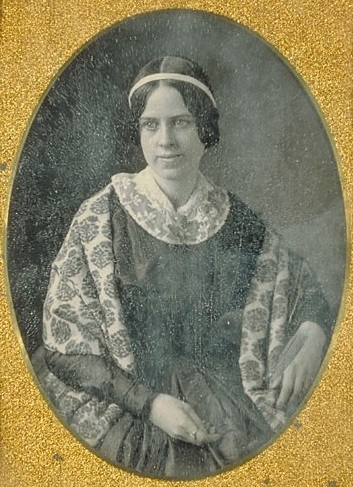
Maria White Lowell

- July 27 – Tokugawa Ieyoshi, 12th shōgun of the Tokugawa shogunate of Japan (b. 1793)
- August 9 – Józef Maria Hoene-Wroński, Polish philosopher (b. 1776)
- August 19 – George Cockburn, British naval commander (b. 1772)
- August 21 – Maria Quitéria, Brazilian national heroine (b. 1792)
- August 23 – Alexander Calder, first mayor of Beaumont, Texas (b. 1806)
- August 29 – Charles James Napier, British army general and colonial administrator (b. 1782)
- September 3 – Augustin Saint-Hilaire, French botanist, traveller (b. 1799)
- September 6 – George Bradshaw, English timetable publisher (b. 1800)
- October 2 – François Arago, French Catalan mathematician, physicist, astronomer and politician (b. 1786)
- October 3 – George Onslow, French composer (b. 1784)
- October 5 – Mahlon Dickerson, American judge, politician (b. 1770)
- October 13 – Jan Cock Blomhoff, Dutch director of Dejima, Japan (b. 1779)
- October 22 – Juan Antonio Lavalleja, Uruguayan military, political figure (b. 1784)
- October 27 – Maria White Lowell, American abolitionist (b. 1821)
- November 15 – Maria II of Portugal, queen regnant (b. 1819)
- December 15 – Georg Friedrich Grotefend, German epigraphist, philologist (b. 1775)
- December 23 – Juliette Bussière Laforest-Courtois, Haitian journalist (b. 1789)

=== Date unknown ===
- Barnard E. Bee, Sr., American attorney and Texan anti-annexation politician (b. 1787)
- Meta Forkel-Liebeskind, German writer and scholar (b. 1765)
- Qiu Ersao, Chinese rebel and military commander, died in action (b. 1822)
- Ferdinando Quaglia, Italian painter of portrait miniatures (b. 1780)
