= List of Brazilian films of 1941 =

A list of films produced in Brazil in 1941:

Title	Director	Cast	Genre	Notes
24 Horas de Sonho	Chianca de Garcia	Dulcina de Moraes, Odilon Azevedo, Conchita de Moraes	Comedy	
A Sedução do Garimpo	Luiz de Barros	Maria Abbate, Carlos Barbosa, Nuripé Bittencourt	Drama	
Entra na Farra	Luiz de Barros	Arnaldo Amaral, Carlos Barbosa, Dircinha Batista	Comedy	
O Dia é Nosso	Milton Rodrigues	Genésio Arruda, Paulo Gracindo, Roberto Acácio	Comedy	
Vamos Cantar	Leo Marten	Ataulfo Alves, Gilberto Alves, Carlos Barbosa	Musical comedy	

== See also ==
- 1941 in Brazil
