= List of Brazilian films of 1950 =

A list of films produced in Brazil in 1950:

Title	Director	Cast	Genre	Notes
A Inconveniência de Ser Esposa	Samuel Markenzon	Álvaro Aguiar, Flávio Cordeiro, Luís Delfino	Comedy	
A Serra da Aventura	Miguel Marracini	Alexandre Alencastro, Celso Camargo, Milton Carvalho	Adventure	
A Sombra da Outra	Watson Macedo	Eliana, Anselmo Duarte, Cecy Medina	Drama	
Alameda da Saudade 113	Carlos Ortiz	Lídia Alencar, Dolores Alvarez, Conceição Andrade	Drama	
Aviso aos Navegantes	Watson Macedo	Oscarito, Grande Otelo, Eliana	Musical comedy	
Caiçara	Adolfo Celi, Tom Payne	Eliane Lage, Abilio Pereira de Almeida, Carlos Vergueiro	Drama	
Caraça, Porta do Céu	Theodor Luts	Alvaro, Sebastião Balbino, Flávio Bernini	Drama	
Cascalho	Leo Marten	Sadi Cabral, Sérgio de Oliveira, Jackson De Souza	Drama	
Écharpe de Seda	Gino Talamo	Rodolfo Arena, Antonio Cursati, Sérgio de Oliveira	Crime	
Estrela da Manhã	Jonald	Paulo Gracindo, Dulce Bressane, Nelson Vaz	Drama	
Garota Mineira	Hans Somborn, Leopold Somporn	Jonas Aguiar, Fernando Amaral, Luiz Coelho	Comedy	
Katucha	Paulo Machado, Edmond F. Bernoudy	Ilka Soares, Milton Carneiro, José Lewgoy	Drama	
Lampião, o Rei do Cangaço	Fouad Anderaos	Adamastor Azevedo, Júlio Vasques Garcia, Carmen Gilberty	Drama	
Não É Nada Disso	José Carlos Burle, Watson Macedo	Humberto Catalano, Modesto De Souza, Marion	Musical comedy	
O Noivo de Minha Mulher	Ferruccio Cerio	Orlando Villar, Dulce Bressane, Humberto Catalano	Comedy	
O Pecado de Nina	Euripides Ramos	Fada Santoro, Cyl Farney, Renato Restier	Drama	
Quando a Noite Acaba	Fernando De Barros	Tônia Carrero, Roberto Acácio, Orlando Villar	Drama	
Somos Dois	Milton Rodrigues	Marina Cunha, Dick Farney, Norma Tamar	Romance	
Todos Por Um	José Cajado Filho	Colé Santana, Celeste Aída, Áurea Paiva	Musical comedy	
Um Beijo Roubado	Leo Marten	Marlene, Walter D'Ávila, Vera Nunes	Musical comedy	

== See also ==
- 1950 in Brazil
