= Quaglia =

Quaglia is an Italian surname. Notable people with the surname include:

- Colleen Quaglia (active 21st century), National level swimmer
- Alberto Quaglia (active early 20th century), Italian soccer coach
- Fernando Quaglia (active early 19th century), Italian painter of portrait miniatures
- Franca Quaglia, Italian women's downhill skier
- Gerolamo Quaglia (1902–1985), Italian wrestler and Olympic medalist in Greco-Roman wrestling
- Giovanni Quaglia (born 1947), politician in Piedmont, Italy
- Giovanni Quaglia, founder of the Italian company SO.RI.MA. (Society for Maritime Recovery)
- Hélio Quaglia Barbosa (1941–2008), Brazilian judge
- Léonhard Quaglia, French ice hockey player at the 1920 and 1928 Winter Olympics
- Marco Quaglia, Italian actor (Gasoline, The Best Day of My Life)
- Martín Quaglia, husband of Colombian television actress Ana María Orozco
- Massimo Quaglia, Italian film editor (The Star Maker, Malèna, La sconosciuta)
- Roberto Quaglia (born 1962), Italian science fiction writer

== See also ==
- Madonna of the Quail (Italian: Madonna della Quaglia), a Gothic painting generally attributed to Pisanello
