= 1941 São Paulo FC season =

São Paulo
1941 season
- Chairman: João Tomás Monteiro da Silva; Décio Pacheco Pedroso
- Manager: Vicente Feola
- Campeonato Paulista: Runners-up

The 1941 football season was São Paulo's 12th season since the club's founding in 1930.

== Overall ==
Games played	39 (20 Campeonato Paulista, 19 Friendly match)
Games won	20 (13 Campeonato Paulista, 7 Friendly match)
Games drawn	10 (5 Campeonato Paulista, 5 Friendly match)
Games lost	9 (2 Campeonato Paulista, 7 Friendly match)
Goals scored	91
Goals conceded	67
Goal difference	+24
Best result	6–1 (A) v São Caetano - Friendly match - 1941.12.14
Worst result	3–7 (H) v Fluminense - Friendly match - 1941.12.21
Most appearances	
Top scorer	

Source: São Paulo FC

== Friendlies ==
February 2 Taça Min. Relações Exteriores	São Paulo (Brazil)	5–2	(Argentina) Gimnasia y Esgrima	São Paulo
	Goal		Goal	Stadium: Estádio Paulo Machado de Carvalho (Pacaembu)

February 19 Taça C. Operário	São Paulo	3–1	Ypiranga	São Paulo
	Goal		Goal	Stadium: Estádio Paulo Machado de Carvalho (Pacaembu)

March 4 National	São Paulo	3–0	Portuguesa	São Paulo
	Goal			Stadium: Estádio Paulo Machado de Carvalho (Pacaembu)

March 16 National	Cruzeiro	1–0	São Paulo	Porto Alegre
	Goal			Stadium: Colina Melancólica

March 19 National	Internacional	3–2	São Paulo	Porto Alegre
	Goal		Goal	Stadium: Estádio Ildo Meneghetti (dos Eucaliptos)

March 30 National	São Caetano EC	3–1	São Paulo	São Caetano do Sul
	Goal		Goal

April 8 National	São Paulo	1–0	Flamengo	São Paulo
	Goal			Stadium: Estádio Paulo Machado de Carvalho (Pacaembu)

April 30 National	São Paulo	0–1	Ypiranga	São Paulo
			Goal	Stadium: Estádio Paulo Machado de Carvalho (Pacaembu)

June 23 National	Inter de Bebedouro	1–3	São Paulo	Bebedouro
	Goal		Goal

July 31 National	São Paulo	2–2	Comercial (SP)	São Paulo
	Goal		Goal	Stadium: Estádio Paulo Machado de Carvalho (Pacaembu)

September 16 National	São Paulo	2–1	Canto do Rio	São Paulo
	Goal		Goal	Stadium: Estádio Paulo Machado de Carvalho (Pacaembu)

October 18 Taça Corinthians	Corinthians	2–0	São Paulo	São Paulo
	Goal			Stadium: Estádio Paulo Machado de Carvalho (Pacaembu)

October 25 National	São Paulo Railway	3–1	São Paulo	São Paulo
	Goal		Goal	Stadium: Estádio Paulo Machado de Carvalho (Pacaembu)

November 18 National	São Paulo	1–1	Vasco da Gama	São Paulo
	Goal		Goal	Stadium: Estádio Paulo Machado de Carvalho (Pacaembu)

November 20 National	São Paulo	2–2	Vasco da Gama	São Paulo
	Goal		Goal	Stadium: Estádio Paulo Machado de Carvalho (Pacaembu)

December 14 National	São Caetano EC	1–6	São Paulo	São Caetano do Sul
	Goal		Goal	Stadium: Francisco Matarazzo

December 21 National	São Paulo	3–7	Fluminense	São Paulo
	Goal		Goal	Stadium: Estádio Paulo Machado de Carvalho (Pacaembu)

December 23 National	São Paulo	2–2	Flamengo	São Paulo
	Goal		Goal	Stadium: Estádio Paulo Machado de Carvalho (Pacaembu)

December 30 National	America-RJ	1–1	São Paulo	São Paulo
	Goal		Goal	Stadium: Estádio Paulo Machado de Carvalho (Pacaembu)

== Official Competitions ==
=== Campeonato Paulista ===
March 9	São Paulo	6–3	São Paulo Railway	São Paulo
	Goal		Goal	Stadium: Estádio Paulo Machado de Carvalho (Pacaembu)

March 23	São Paulo	1–0	Portuguesa	São Paulo
	Goal			Stadium: Estádio Paulo Machado de Carvalho (Pacaembu)

April 6	Corinthians	2–1	São Paulo	São Paulo
	Goal		Goal	Stadium: Estádio Alfredo Schürig (Parque São Jorge)

April 13	São Paulo	4–1	Ypiranga	São Paulo
	Goal		Goal	Stadium: Estádio Paulo Machado de Carvalho (Pacaembu)

May 11	São Paulo	1–0	Juventus	São Paulo
	Goal			Stadium: Estádio Paulo Machado de Carvalho (Pacaembu)

May 18	São Paulo	4–2	Santos	São Paulo
	Goal		Goal	Stadium: Estádio Paulo Machado de Carvalho (Pacaembu)

June 1	Portuguesa Santista	4–4	São Paulo	Santos
	Goal		Goal	Stadium: Estádio Ulrico Mursa

June 15	São Paulo	0–0	Palestra Itália	São Paulo
				Stadium: Estádio Paulo Machado de Carvalho (Pacaembu)

June 29	São Paulo	2–1	Comercial (SP)	São Paulo
	Goal		Goal	Stadium: Estádio Paulo Machado de Carvalho (Pacaembu)

July 6	São Paulo	4–2	Espanha	São Paulo
	Goal		Goal	Stadium: Estádio Paulo Machado de Carvalho (Pacaembu)

July 20	São Paulo	2–2	São Paulo Railway	São Paulo
	Goal		Goal	Stadium: Estádio Paulo Machado de Carvalho (Pacaembu)

July 27	São Paulo	1–1	Portuguesa	São Paulo
	Goal		Goal	Stadium: Estádio Paulo Machado de Carvalho (Pacaembu)

August 10	São Paulo	0–3	Corinthians	São Paulo
			Goal	Stadium: Estádio Paulo Machado de Carvalho (Pacaembu)

August 17	Ypiranga	2–5	São Paulo	São Paulo
	Goal		Goal	Stadium: Rua dos Sorocabanos

August 31	Juventus	1–2	São Paulo	São Paulo
	Goal		Goal	Stadium: Estádio Conde Rodolfo Crespi (Rua Javari)

September 6	São Paulo	5–2	Espanha	São Paulo
	Goal		Goal	Stadium: Estádio Paulo Machado de Carvalho (Pacaembu)

September 14	Santos	3–3	São Paulo	Santos
	Goal		Goal	Stadium: Estádio Urbano Caldeira (Vila Belmiro)

September 21	São Paulo	4–0	Comercial (SP)	São Paulo
	Goal			Stadium: Estádio Paulo Machado de Carvalho (Pacaembu)

September 28	São Paulo	4–2	Portuguesa Santista	São Paulo
	Goal		Goal	Stadium: Estádio Paulo Machado de Carvalho (Pacaembu)

October 4	Palestra Itália	1–2	São Paulo	São Paulo
	Goal		Goal	Stadium: Estádio Palestra Itália (Parque Antarctica)

==== Record ====
Final Position	Points	Matches	Wins	Draws	Losses	Goals For	Goals Away	Win%
2nd	31	20	13	5	2	55	32	77%
