= Lewis Adams =

Lewis Adams may refer to:

- Lewis Adams (activist) (1842–1905), African-American former slave, worked to found the school which became Tuskegee University
- Lewis Greenleaf Adams (1897–1977), American architect
- Lewis Brian Adams (1809–1853), English painter
- Lew Adams (Lewis Drummond Adams, born 1939), British trade unionist
