= 1950 in Brazil =

Events in the year 1950 in Brazil.

== Incumbents ==
=== Federal government ===
- President: Marshal Eurico Gaspar Dutra
- Vice President: Nereu Ramos

=== Governors ===
- Alagoas: Silvestre Pericles
- Amazonas: Leopoldo da Silva Amorim Neves
- Bahia: Otávio Mangabeira
- Ceará: Faustino de Albuquerque
- Espírito Santo: Carlos Fernando Monteiro Lindenberg
- Goiás:
  - Jerônimo Coimbra Bueno (until 30 June)
  - Hosanah Guimarães (from 30 June)
- Maranhão: Sebastian Archer
- Mato Grosso:
  - Arnaldo Estêvão de Figueiredo (until 1 July)
  - Jari Gomes (from 1 July)
- Minas Gerais: Milton Soares Campos
- Pará:
  - Luís de Moura Carvalho (until 30 June)
  - Alberto Engelhard (from 30 June)
- Paraíba: Osvaldo Trigueiro
- Paraná: Moisés Lupion
- Pernambuco: Alexandre Barbosa Lima Sobrinho
- Piauí: José da Rocha Furtado
- Rio de Janeiro: Macedo Soares
- Rio Grande do Norte: José Augusto Varela
- Rio Grande do Sul: Walter Só Jobim
- Santa Catarina: Aderbal Ramos da Silva
- São Paulo: Ademar de Barros
- Sergipe: Jose Rollemberg

=== Vice governors ===
- Ceará: Francisco de Menezes Pimentel
- Espírito Santo: José Rodrigues Sette
- Goiás:
  - Hosanah de Campos Guimarães (until 30 June)
  - Vacant thereafter (from 30 June)
- Maranhão: Saturnino Bello
- Minas Gerais: José Ribeiro Pena
- Paraíba: José Targino Pereira da Costa
- Piauí: Osvaldo da Costa e Silva
- Rio Grande do Norte: Tomaz Salustino
- São Paulo: Luís Gonzaga Novelli Júnior

== Events ==
- date unknown - After being grounded because of a shortage of equipment, the airline Transportes Aéreos Bandeirantes is sold to Lóide Aéreo Nacional.

=== April ===
- 6 April: At Tanguá on the Leopoldina Railway, heavy rain causes flooding in the Rio Tanguá and a bridge to collapse under a train going from Rio de Janeiro to Vitória. The locomotive and several cars fall into the river; 90 people swim to safety, but 110 are killed and over 300 injured.

=== June ===
- 24 June: The 1950 World Cup begins in Brazil.

=== July ===
- 16 July: The 1950 World Cup ends, with the 2-1 defeat of the Brazilian national team by Uruguay at the Maracanã.
- 28 July: A Constellation plane crashes into Morro do Chapéu, near Porto Alegre airport, killing 50 people.

=== September ===
- 18 September: The first television channel in Brazil, TV Tupi opens in São Paulo, by businessman Assis Chateaubriand.

=== October ===
- 3 October: The Brazilian general election is won by the Social Democratic Party, who remain the largest party in both the Chamber of Deputies and the Senate, although they lose their majority in the former. The presidential election is won by former President Getúlio Vargas of the Brazilian Labour Party.

== Arts and culture ==
=== Books ===
- Ulrich Becher - Brasilianischer Romanzero (published in Vienna)

=== Films ===
- Alameda da Saudade 113, directed by Carlos Ortiz.
- Caiçara, co-directed by Adolfo Celi, Tom Payne, and John Waterhouse, starring Celi and José Mauro de Vasconcelos.
- Caraça, Porta do Céu, directed by Theodor Luts, starring José Álvaro Morais.
- Quando a Noite Acaba, starring Tônia Carrero.

== Births ==
=== January ===
- 2 January: Débora Duarte, actress
- 14 January: Nelson Bornier, lawyer and politician (died 2021)
- 15 January: Bebeto de Freitas, volleyball coach and president of Botafogo FR (died 2018)
- 20 January: Daniel Benzali, actor

=== February ===
- 12 February: João W. Nery, writer and LGBT activist (died 2018)
- 23 February: Marcel Telles, businessman

=== March ===
- 15 March: Cláudio Duarte, footballer and coach

=== April ===
- 7 April: Marisa Letícia Lula da Silva, former First Lady of Brazil (died 2017)

=== May ===
- 2 May: Fausto Silva, television presenter

=== June ===
- 8 June: Sonia Braga, actress

=== July ===
- 21 July: Galvão Bueno, play by play announcer

=== August ===
- 1 August: José Dumont, actor

=== September ===
- 7 September: Mário Sérgio, footballer (died 2016)

== Deaths ==
=== May ===
- 8 May: Vital Brazil, physician and immunologist (born 1865)

=== October ===
- 2 October: J. Carlos, illustrator and designer (born 1884)

== See also ==
- 1950 in Brazilian football
- List of Brazilian films of 1950
