= Corvetto =

Corvetto may refer to:

- Corvetto (fairy tale), Italian fairy tale by Giambattista Basile
- Corvetto (Milan Metro), Milan Metro stations

== People ==
- Nicolás Corvetto (born 1986), Chilean footballer
- Louis-Emmanuel Corvetto (1756–1821) Genoese-French lawyer and politician
