= 24 Horas de Sonho =

1941 film directed by Chianca de Garcia

- Directed by: Chianca de Garcia
- Written by: Joracy Camargo
- Produced by: Adhemar Gonzaga
- Starring: Dulcina de Moraes; Laura Suarez; Odilon Azevedo; Sarah Nobre
- Cinematography: George Fanto
- Production company: Cinédia
- Release date: 25 September 1941 (Brazil)
- Country: Brazil
- Language: Portuguese

24 Horas de Sonho is a 1941 Brazilian comedy film directed by Chianca de Garcia, starring Dulcina de Moraes and Odilon Azevedo.

== Cast ==
Actor/actress	Role
Dulcina de Moraes	Clarice, Baroness of the High Towers
Odilon Azevedo	Roberto Rei
Laura Suarez	Princess Merly de Aubignon
Beatriz Segall	Glória Seydoux Gayet
Átila de Moraes	Conde Guilherme Stanley
Sarah Nobre	Madame Flora
Conchita de Moraes	Room maid
Paulo Gracindo	Radio director
Sadi Cabral	Hotel manager
Aristóteles Pena	Cícero
