= Felipe Bornier =

Brazilian politician (born 1978)

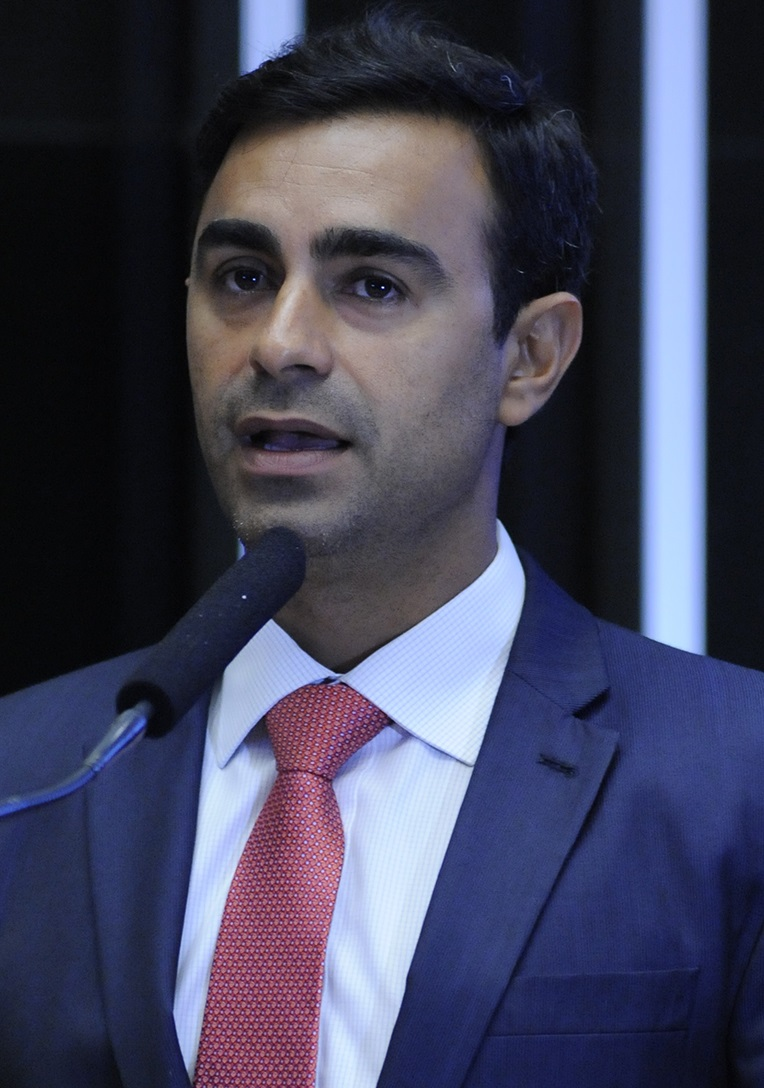
- Bornier in 2016

Member of the Chamber of Deputies
- In office 1 February 2007 – 2 January 2019
- Constituency: Rio de Janeiro

Personal details
- Born: 26 December 1978 (age 47)
- Party: Solidarity (since 2023)
- Parent: Nelson Bornier (father)

Felipe Leone Bornier de Oliveira (born 26 December 1978) is a Brazilian politician. From 2007 to 2019, he was a member of the Chamber of Deputies. He is the son of Nelson Bornier.
