= 1865 in Brazil =

Events in the year 1865 in Brazil.

== Incumbents ==
- Monarch: Pedro II
- Prime Minister:
  - Francisco José Furtado (until 12 May)
  - Marquis of Olinda (starting 12 May)

== Events ==
- 10 June - Battle of São Borja

== Births ==
- April 28 - Vital Brazil, biomedical scientist and immunologist (died 1950)
- May 5 - Cândido Rondon, military officer (died 1958)
