= Enoteca Saint VinSaint =

Wine bar in São Paulo, Brazil

- Interactive map of Enoteca Saint VinSaint

Restaurant information
- Established: January 22, 2008
- Closed: November 2025
- Previous owners: Lis Cereja; Ramatis Russo
- Head chef: Lis Cereja
- Food type: Enoteca organic
- Location: São Paulo, São Paulo, Brazil
- Website: saintvinsaint.com.br

Enoteca Saint VinSaint was a enoteca located in Vila Nova Conceição, in the city of São Paulo, founded in 2008. It was a pioneer in bringing natural wine to the Brazilian market.

== History ==
Enoteca Saint VinSaint was founded on January 22, 2008, by Lis Cereja and Ramatis Russo, who pioneered the sale of natural wines in São Paulo. Named in honor of Vincent of Saragossa, the bar, founded in Vila Nova Conceição, became a pioneer in introducing natural and artisanal wines to São Paulo's nightlife.

Starting in 2010, the wine list consisted entirely of natural, organic, and biodynamic wines. At one point, the winery offered 400 different wine labels, all organic, artisanal, and produced by the couple themselves on a small rural property in the Mantiqueira Mountains. The venue also featured a bistro and a selection of craft beers. In addition, it also held workshops and organic wine tastings, which initially took place inside the restaurant but later had to be expanded. Due to the impacts of the COVID-19 pandemic and social distancing measures, the restaurant has started offering delivery service for its bottles of wine.

=== Closure ===
In November 2025, it was announced that the wine bar would be closing. According to the statement, the company never fully recovered from the challenges that arose in the wake of the COVID-19 pandemic, in addition to changes in beverage consumption in the post-pandemic era, and reflected on the lack of collaboration within the organic production sector and whether customers truly care about sustainability in the kitchen.

== Reception ==
In 2018, it was included in the list of the 10 best wine lists in São Paulo published by Paladar, by the newspaper O Estado de S. Paulo.
