= Louis-Emmanuel Corvetto =

Genoese lawyer

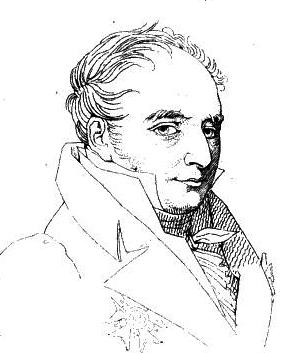
- Engraving by J.M.N. Frémy after a painting by Fernando Quaglia
- Born: Luigi Emanuele Corvetto; 12 July 1756; Genoa, Republic of Genoa
- Died: 21 May 1821 (aged 64); Genoa, Kingdom of Sardinia
- Occupations: Lawyer, politician
- Known for: Minister of Finance

Louis-Emmanuel Corvetto (12 July 1756 – 21 May 1821) was a Genoese lawyer who supported the French Revolution, became a leading politician under the First French Empire and was a successful Minister of Finance at the start of the Bourbon Restoration.

== Early years ==
Luigi Emanuele Corvetto was born in Genoa, Republic of Genoa, on 12 July 1756. His family originated in Nervi, 10 kilometres (6.2 mi) east of Genoa. He was the oldest son of Luigi Corvetto and Maddalena Turpia. His father was a professor of civil architecture in Genoa and his mother was from a family of merchants doing business in Amsterdam. At the age of eleven he entered the church school at Genoa, where he did well in classical studies and showing a strong taste for literature. He then studied law, specializing in commercial and maritime law. He spoke excellent French. In 1788 Corvetto married Anna Schiaffino in Geneo, from a well-known trading family. Of their children, two daughters survived and married.

== Political career ==
Corvetto supported the French Revolution, and in 1797 was appointed Chairman of the Executive Board of the Ligurian Republic. He became a member of the State Council in 1806. In 1814 he was naturalized as a French citizen. Under the Bourbon Restoration Corvetto was appointed Minister of Finance, holding office from 26 September 1815 to 7 December 1818. He was able to restore financial stability and reestablish the credit of the state.

Corvetto died in Genoa on 21 May 1821, aged 64.
