= 1941 in Brazil =

Events in the year 1941 in Brazil.

== Incumbents ==
=== Federal government ===
- President: Getúlio Vargas

=== Governors ===
- Alagoas: José Maria Correia das Neves (till 19 February); Ismar de Góis Monteiro (from 19 February)
- Amazonas: Álvaro Botelho Maia
- Bahia: Landulfo Alves
- Ceará: Francisco de Meneses Pimentel
- Espírito Santo: João Punaro Bley
- Goiás: Pedro Ludovico Teixeira
- Maranhão:
- Mato Grosso: Júlio Strübing Müller
- Minas Gerais: Benedito Valadares Ribeiro
- Pará: José Carneiro da Gama Malcher
- Paraíba: Rui Carneiro
- Paraná: Manuel Ribas
- Pernambuco: Agamenon Magalhães
- Piauí: Leônidas Melo
- Rio Grande do Norte: Rafael Fernandes Gurjão
- Rio Grande do Sul: Osvaldo Cordeiro de Farias
- Santa Catarina: Nereu Ramos
- São Paulo: Ademar de Barros (till 4 June); Fernando de Sousa Costa (from 4 June)
- Sergipe: Erônides de Carvalho (till 30 June); Milton Pereira de Azevedo (from 30 June)

=== Vice governors ===
- Rio Grande do Norte: no vice governor
- São Paulo: no vice governor

== Events ==
- 22 March – The Brazilian ship Taubaté is attacked by a German warplane in the Mediterranean Sea.
- 21 September – The Estádio Presidente Vargas is opened at Fortaleza.
- date unknown
  - The pulp and paper company Celulose Irani is founded in the State of Rio Grande do Sul.
  - Oscar Lorenzo Fernández's nationalist-themed opera, Malazarte, to a libretto by José Pereira Graça Aranha, receives its première at the Teatro Municipal, Rio de Janeiro, eight years after it was completed.

== Arts and culture ==
=== Films ===
- Barulho na Universidade
- 24 Horas de Sonho

== Births ==
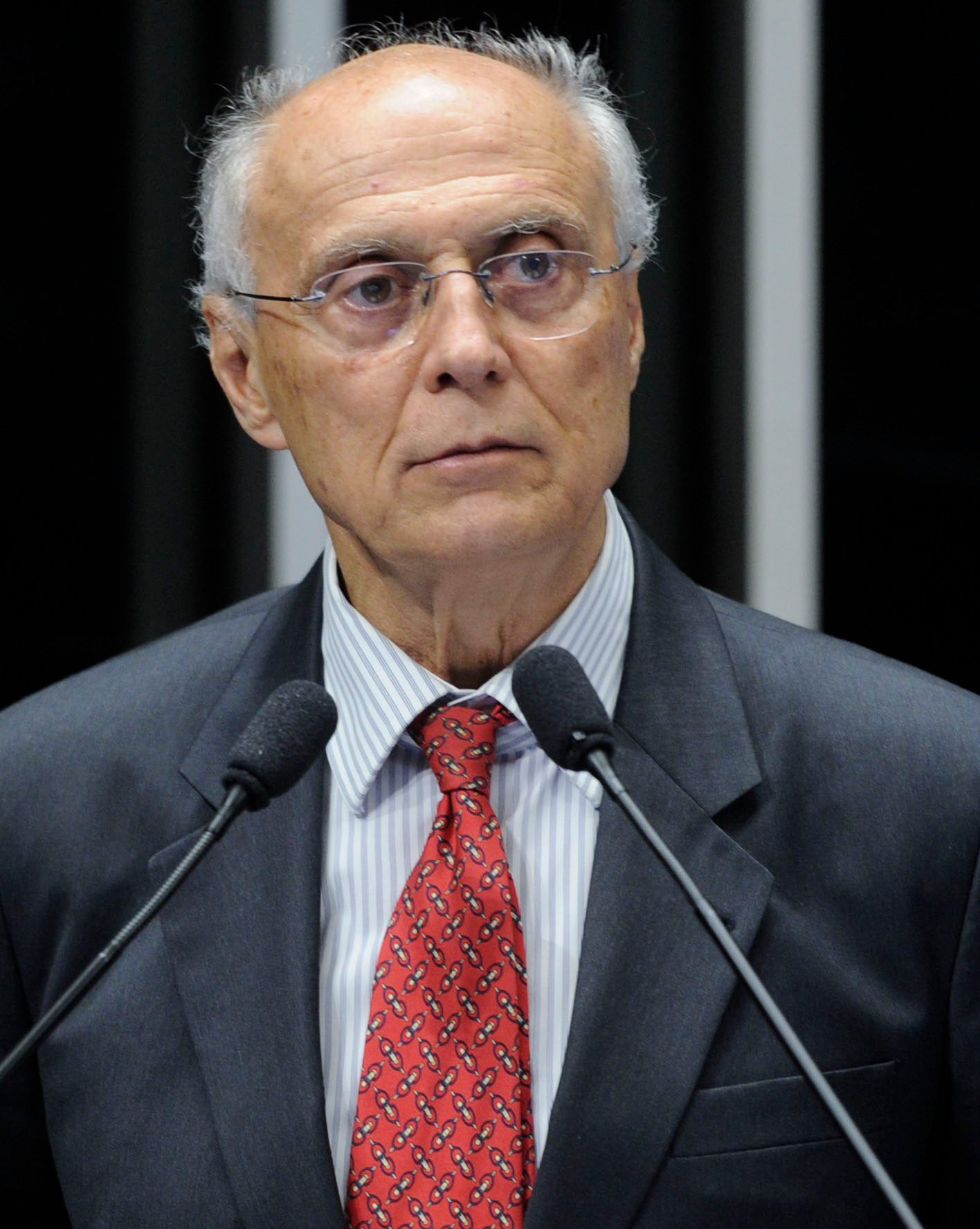
Eduardo Suplicy

=== February ===
- 11 February – Sérgio Mendes, musician
- 12 February – Dominguinhos, composer, accordionist and singer (died 2013)
- 15 February – Florinda Bolkan, actress

=== March ===
- 8 March – Neusa Borges, actress and singer
- 26 March – José Edison Mandarino, tennis player

=== April ===
- 19 April – Roberto Carlos, singer
- 22 April – José Guilherme Merquior, diplomat, academic, writer, literary critic and philosopher (died 1991)
- 29 April – Nana Caymmi, singer, daughter of Dorival Caymmi
- 21 June – Eduardo Suplicy, left-wing politician, economist and professor
- 7 August – Celso Lafer, jurist, philosopher and politician
- 30 August – Nelson Xavier, actor (died 2017)

== Deaths ==
- 9 March – Nestor Gomez, politician (born 1875)

== See also ==
- 1941 in Brazilian football
- List of Brazilian films of 1941
