= Jules Chauvet =

French chemist

Jules Chauvet (1907–1989) was a wine négociant. He worked from La Chapelle-de-Guinchay in the Beaujolais.

Jules Chauvet was a winemaker and a taster. He also possessed the skills of a chemist, which he obtained at the school of chemistry at Lyon, then with Otto Warburg, with whom he maintained a long correspondence. He worked particularly on yeast, malolactic fermentation and carbonic maceration.

He also was a teacher in winemaking. As such he later inspired the movement of natural wines. He leaves books of quality, including The aroma of fine wine, the text of a lecture he delivered at the wine fair of Mâcon in 1950.

== Own books ==
- L'Esthétique du vin, Jean-Paul Rocher publisher, Paris, 104 p., ISBN 978-2-917411-14-8
- Études scientifiques et autres communications (1949-1988), Jean-Paul Rocher publisher, Paris, 193 p., ISBN 978-2-911361-93-7
- L'Arôme des vins fins, in Le Vin en question, an interview with Hans Ulrich Kesselring, Jean-Paul Rocher publisher, Paris, 1998, 108 p., ISBN 978-2-911361-08-1
- Vins à la carte, tome 1, Jean-Paul Rocher publisher, Paris, 1998, ISBN 978-2-911361-07-4
- La dégustation des vins, son mécanisme et ses lois in Évelyne Léard-Viboux & Lucien Chauvet, Jules Chauvet, naturellement..., Jean-Paul Rocher publisher, Paris, 2006, 113 p., ISBN 978-2-911361-81-4

== Bibliography ==
- Sébastien Lapaque, Chez Marcel Lapierre, Stock, collection Écrivins, Paris, 2004, ISBN 2-234-05674-8
- J.-Camille Goy, Jules Chauvet. L'homme du vin perdu, Jean-Paul Rocher publisher, coll. « Magenta », Paris, 2002, 110 p., ISBN 978-2-911361-41-8
- Jacques Néauport, Jules Chauvet ou le talent du vin, Jean-Paul Rocher publisher, Paris, 1997, 332 p., ISBN 978-2-911361-04-3

== See also ==
- List of wine personalities
