= Dulce Nunes =

Brazilian singer-songwriter (1929–2020)

- Born: Dulce Pinto Bressane; June 11, 1929; Rio de Janeiro, Rio de Janeiro, Brazil
- Died: June 4, 2020 (aged 90) Rio de Janeiro, Rio de Janeiro, Brazil
- Genres: MPB
- Instrument: Vocals
- Years active: 1964–1968
- Labels: CBS Records International, Forma

Dulce Pinto Bressane (11 June 1929 – 4 June 2020), known professionally as Dulce Nunes or Dulce Bressane, was a Brazilian actress and singer-songwriter of the genre MPB.

== Career ==
As a singer-songwriter, Nunes released three studio albums between 1964 and 1968, one of them alongside Carlos Lyra. She also collaborated as special guest in several albums by her then husband Egberto Gismonti.

Outside her musical career, Nunes also ventured into cinema, acting in four Feature films between 1949 and 1967.

Nunes was also an architect and owned Bressane Arquitetura & Interiores, an architecture firm in Rio de Janeiro.

== Personal life and death ==
Nunes was married two times. First to pianist Bené Nunes, which union ended in 1965. Later, she wed fellow musician Egberto Gismonti between 1968 and 1976.

On 4 June 2020, Nunes died from complications of COVID-19 in Rio de Janeiro, at age 90, during the COVID-19 pandemic in Brazil.

== Discography ==
=== Studio albums ===
Year	Album	Album details
1964	Pobre Menina Rica (With Carlos Lyra)	Label: CBS Records International; Format: Vinyl
1966	Dulce	Label: Forma; Format: Vinyl
1968	Samba do Escritor	Label: Forma; Format: Vinyl

== Filmography ==
=== Cinema ===
Year	Title	Notes
1949	A Mulher de Longe	
1950	Morning Star	
1950	O noivo de Minha Mulher	
1967	The ABC of Love	Segment O Pacto
