= Juliette Bussière Laforest-Courtois =

Haitian teacher and journalist (1789–1853)

Juliette Bussière Laforest-Courtois (Cap-Français, Saint-Domingue (later Haiti) 1789 – 24 December 1853), was a Haitian teacher and journalist. She co-founded and managed the first school in Haiti opened to girls (1818–1828) and co-managed the paper La Feuille du Commerce. where she was active as a journalist (1828–1853). She was the first journalist of her gender in Haiti.

== Life ==
She was a member of the affranchi. Shortly after birth, she followed her father to Paris, where she received an education.

She settled in Haiti after her marriage to Joseph Courtois in 1816. From 1818 to 1828 the couple managed their own co-educational school, La Maison d'Education. She tutored in music and literature at this school. It was at the time the only school open to girls; while President Alexandre Pétion did establish a girls school under the management of Madame Drury in 1816, it had been only a temporary experiment, which made the Courtois school a pioneer school for girls. When it was closed, there were no formal education for girls in Haiti until the Imperial girls schools Pensionnat national de demoiselles and the Collège Olive in 1850.

She also managed the paper La Feuille du Commerce jointly with her husband. No other woman would work as a journalist in Haiti until Anna Augustin's founding of "Fémina" in 1923. The paper voiced the opposition against president Jean-Pierre Boyer and later emperor Faustin Soulouque. Her husband was sentenced to jail during both regimes, during which she managed the paper by herself. Laforest-Courtois would subsequently assume complete leadership of the daily after her husband's passing and manage it for a decade until her death in 1853.
