= Leopold Poetsch =

Austrian history teacher (1853 – 1942)

Leopold Poetsch (or Pötsch) (18 November 1853 – 16 October 1942) was an Austrian history teacher. He was a school teacher of Adolf Hitler at the Linz high school. He influenced the future leader's later views, specifically German nationalism.

Hitler wrote about Poetsch in Mein Kampf:

In my teacher, Dr. Leopold Poetsch of the high school in Linz, this requirement was fulfilled in a truly ideal manner. An old gentleman, kind but at the same time firm, he was able not only to hold our attention by his dazzling eloquence but to carry us away with him. Even today I think back with genuine emotion on this gray-haired man who, by the fire of his words, sometimes made us forget the present; who as if by magic, transported us into times past and, out of the millennium mists of time, transformed dry historical facts into vivid reality. There we sat, often aflame with enthusiasm sometimes even moved to tears... He used our budding national fanaticism as a means of educating us, frequently appealing to our sense of national honor. This teacher made history my favorite subject. And indeed, though he had no such intention, it was then that I became a young revolutionary.

While touring Austria after the annexation of 1938, Hitler stopped at Klagenfurt to visit Poetsch. Poetsch revealed that he was a member of the underground Austrian SS which had been outlawed during Austria's independence. During this reunion, Hitler and Poetsch conversed in private for over an hour. Hitler would later confide to his traveling companions that, "You cannot imagine how much I owe to that old man."

He also took some distance from his former pupil, among other things since considering Hitler had become an enemy of Austria.

== Bibliography ==
- Shirer, William L. Rise and Fall of the Third Reich: A History of Nazi Germany. Simon & Schuster, 1990. ISBN 0-671-72868-7
- Pool, James Hitler and his secret partners: Contributions, Loot and Rewards, 1933–1945. Pocket Books, 1997. ISBN 0-671-76082-3
- Hamann, Brigitte Hitler's Vienna: A Dictator's Apprenticeship. Oxford University Press, 1999. ISBN 0-19-514053-2
- Hitler, Adolf Mein Kampf. Indialog Publications Pvt. Ltd., 2002. ISBN 81-87981-29-6
- Mein Kampf, page 15-18
- M. Kerrigan. HITLER: El Hombre detrás del Monstruo. ISBN 978-84-9794-380-2
- Kuzibek, August "The Young Hitler I knew." Boston, 1955.
