= Nelson Bornier =

Brazilian lawyer and politician (1950–2021)

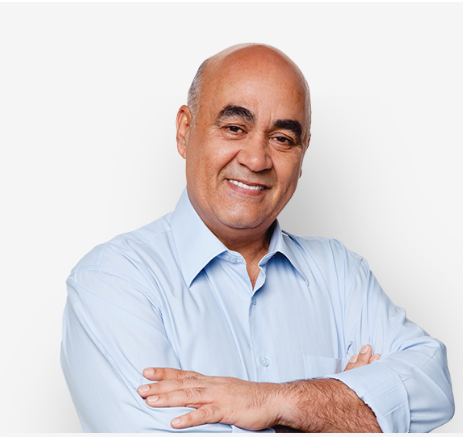

Mayor of Nova Iguaçu
- In office January 1, 2013 – January 1, 2017
- Preceded by: Sheila Gama
- Succeeded by: Rogério Lisboa
- In office January 1, 1997 – April 5, 2002
- Preceded by: Altamir Gomes Moreira
- Succeeded by: Mário Pereira Marques Filho

Member of the Chamber of Deputies for Rio de Janeiro
- In office February 1, 1991 – April 5, 1996
- In office February 1, 2003 – April 5, 2012

Personal details
- Born: January 14, 1950 Nova Iguaçu, Rio de Janeiro, Brazil
- Died: April 11, 2021 (aged 71) Rio de Janeiro, Brazil
- Party: MDB (2007–2021)
- Other political affiliations: PL (1991–1994); PSDB (1994–2002); PL (2002–2007)
- Children: 2, including Felipe
- Profession: Lawyer and politician

Nelson Bornier (January 14, 1950 – April 11, 2021) was a Brazilian lawyer and politician. He served as a federal deputy for the Rio de Janeiro for five terms and was the only mayor elected three times in Nova Iguaçu. In 2016 Bornier was a candidate for re-election to the mayor for the A Mudança Vai Continue coalition, which brought together eighteen parties.

== Early life ==
Born on January 14, 1950, in Nova Iguaçu, State of Rio de Janeiro, Bornier was the son of seresteiro Nelson Nunes and Dalva Bornier.

Bornier grew up in the K11 neighborhood of Nova Iguaçu, with his sisters Rosa Maria, Maria Luiza and their parents. At the age of 12, he began working as a clerk in the Rene Granado Office. Before graduating in Law in 1977, he opened an accounting office with his sister Rosa, providing services to the main companies in the city, such as Compactor and Grande Rio. He received a degree in Law from the Faculty of Valença in Rio de Janeiro.

== Political career ==
=== Congressman ===
Nelson Bornier was elected, on five occasions, to the post of federal deputy for the state of Rio de Janeiro. In the first, in 1990, he was elected by the PL for the period from 1991 to 1995.

In the second, in 1994, he was elected by the PSDB for the term from 1995 to 1999, being the fourth most voted candidate in Rio de Janeiro, with more than 100,000 votes. In 1996, Bornier resigned as a federal deputy to take over the city of Nova Iguaçu for the first time.

In 2002, Bornier was elected by the PL for his third term, from 2003 to 2007, being the tenth most voted candidate in Rio de Janeiro, with about 130,000 votes. For the fourth time, he was elected by the PMDB for the term from 2007 to 2011, being the sixth most voted candidate in Rio de Janeiro, with about 130,000 votes.

In 2010, he received just over 70,000 votes and was not elected to office. However, as a substitute, as of February 18, 2011, he assumed the position of federal deputy in the period from 2011 to 2015, after the dismissal of deputy Pedro Paulo.

In 2012, Bornier resigned, once again, as federal deputy to run for mayor of Nova Iguaçu.

=== Mayor of Nova Iguaçu ===
Bornier was elected mayor of Nova Iguaçu in 1996 in the first round, by the PSDB, with 56% of the valid votes (amounting to about 180,000). During his first term in office, Nelson Bornier reviewed the Nova Iguaçu Master Plan, through municipal law 006, of December 12, 1997, which, among other determinations, determined the delimitation of the territory used until 2008. During this period, Nova Iguaçu benefited from the completion, by the state government, of the construction of Via Light, on August 15, 1998, which radically changed the city center. Also in this period there was the emancipation of the municipality of Mesquita, through state law number 3253, of September 25, 1999.

In 2000, Bornier was reelected, in the first round, with about 204,000 votes, for the period from 2001 to 2005. In 2002, he resigned from the mayor's office to run again as federal deputy, on behalf of his deputy, Mário Marques.

In 2008, Bornier again ran for the municipal elections, for the PMDB, having as an opponent the then mayor, Lindberg Farias whom won the elections in the first round, with Bornier in the second, counting more than 130,000 votes. Bornier suffered, at that time, his first political defeat in the city where his electoral base is located.

In 2012, again for the PMDB, Bornier ran in elections with the main mayor, Sheila Gama, as the main opponent. Bornier won the first round with about 150,000 votes. Following a court decision, Bornier's ballot underwent a change three days before the elections: the replacement of Vice Nicolasina Acarisi by her daughter, Dr. Dani Nicolasina. Nelson Bornier was elected, in the second round, mayor of Nova Iguaçu for the period from 2013 to 2017, with about 207,000 votes.

In 2013, Bornier granted a 102% increase to his salary, his deputy and his secretaries. The Court of Accounts of Rio de Janeiro considered the measure illegitimate and therefore Bornier decided to transfer this amount to the Hospital da Posse sheet.

In 2016, Bornier could not be re-elected, being defeated by his main opponent, Rogério Lisboa.

== Personal life ==
With his wife Lucir he had two children, Flávia and Felipe Bornier; the latter followed his father's career, becoming a federal deputy for PROS. In addition, Bornier had two grandchildren: João Felipe and Maria Clara.

He was a devotee of Santo Antônio and a fan of Flamengo.

In January 2016, his father died after a diagnosis of pneumonia.

== Death ==
Bornier died on April 11, 2021, at the Badim Hospital in Rio de Janeiro, at the age of 71, from COVID-19.

== Awards ==
In 2016, Bornier won the ninth edition of the Sebrae Award for the Greatest Entrepreneur in the category of Municipalities Members of the G100.
