= Murder of Rachel Genofre =

2008 killing of a girl in Paraná, Brazil

- Location: Curitiba, Paraná, Brazil
- Date: 3 November 2008
- Attack type: Rape; child murder by asphyxiation
- Weapon: Plastic bags
- Deaths: 1
- Victim: Rachel Genofre
- Perpetrator: Carlos Eduardo dos Santos

Rachel Genofre was a 9-year-old girl found dead in a suitcase at the Curitiba bus station in the early hours of November 5, 2008. The crime remained unsolved for 11 years until the police identified Carlos Eduardo dos Santos through DNA tests. At the time, he was already in prison for several other crimes, including the rape of a young boy, but he was also sentenced in May 2021 to 50 years in prison for the rape and murder of Rachel.

The crime had and still has great repercussions in the press and even in 2021 it was called "sad" on the portal of the magazine Aventuras na História. In 2022, in an interview with the specialized Operation Police channel on YouTube, delegate Vanessa Alice called the case "shocking". "To commit this type of crime, to leave this child's body as it was, you have to be a psychopath", said the police chief.

The case runs in camera.

== The crime ==
Rachel Genofre disappeared at the end of November 3, 2008, after leaving school, Instituto de Educação, where she was considered an active and intelligent student. She was last seen around 5:30 pm, at a point near Praça Rui Barbosa, on Rua Voluntários da Pátria, in the center of Curitiba, by two colleagues who had accompanied her to this point. Hours later, after the daughter did not return home, her parents approached the police and a search began to locate her.

Two days after her disappearance, on November 5, the girl's body was found by two indigenous people inside a suitcase that had been left under a ladder on the Curitiba Railway Station. The police were immediately called and the identity was confirmed after examinations at the Instituto Médico Legal, where the body was recognized by her father.

When found, the victim was naked from the waist down and the body was in a fetal position, wrapped in a blood-stained sheet, with signs of physical aggression (bites, bruises, signs of bindings on the arms, among others), strangulation and sexual violence. According to delegate Vanessa, the coroners pointed out that she had suffered anal penetration, which caused rupture from the anus to the vagina, despite the hymen being intact.

Experts estimate that she was assaulted and raped for about 20 hours and that death must have happened on the 4th in the afternoon.

== Investigations ==
The surveillance cameras at the railroad station were not working on the day the suitcase was placed there, which made it difficult to identify the criminal. In addition, according to the testimony of delegates Vanessa and Camilla Chies to the Police Operation, there was no other clue as to who could be the author of the crime. So, to try to solve the case, for almost 11 years more than 200 DNA tests were carried out and several men were arrested, but no suspicion was confirmed.

The case came to an end in 2019 when a scan was carried out through the National Bank of Genetic Profiles, after determination by the STF to improve this system, and a sample of genetic material ( sperm ) that had been collected in 2008 in the victim's anal canal "matched" with that of a criminal who was imprisoned in São Paulo. "It was a great relief to come to this murderer through indisputable evidence", said the police chief Camilla to the Police Operation.

== The criminal ==
The author of the crime, Carlos Eduardo dos Santos, had been imprisoned in Sorocaba, São Paulo, since 2016, serving time in a special prison for people who commit sexual crimes. He was serving 22 years for a case of rape against a boy, in 1985, in São Vicente, São Paulo. He was also involved in other cases of rape of a minor, theft, embezzlement, use of false documents, attempted registration of a child and qualified damage.

In a statement to delegate Vanessa, he initially denied the crime, but when confronted with the DNA test, he confessed, but said that he had committed the rape after the girl's death, in which he was again confronted with the evidence (photographs), since that the victim had bled. According to the delegate, he knew that if he were convicted of "a corpse the penalty would be less".

He also detailed that to attract the girl, he presented himself as a producer of the children's television program Patati Patatá, saying that she could be hired, as long as she accompanied him to sign the papers. Arriving at the place, Rachel would have been surprised when he had closed the door and the two had been left alone. The girl then would have started screaming and to shut her up he would have put plastic bags over her head.

For the crimes committed against Rachel, in May 2021 Carlos was sentenced to 40 years in prison for triple-qualified homicide (cruel means, asphyxiation and concealment of the body) and 10 years for indecent assault. After the conviction, Maria Cristina Lobo, the girl's mother, said that now there was "one less monster in our circulation".

"To commit this type of crime, to leave this child's body as it was, you have to be a psychopath", said police chief Vanessa to the Police Operation.
