= Morning Star (1950 film) =

1950 film

- Directed by: Osvaldo de Oliveira
- Written by: Osvaldo de Oliveira; Jorge Amado; Ruy Santos
- Produced by: Afonso Campiglia
- Starring: Doris Duranti; Paulo Gracindo; Dulce Nunes
- Cinematography: Ruy Santos
- Music by: Radamés Gnatalli
- Production companies: Filmoteca Cultural; Pró Arte Filmes
- Release date: 1950
- Country: Brazil
- Language: Portuguese

Morning Star (Portuguese: Estrela da Manhã) is a 1950 Brazilian drama film directed by Osvaldo de Oliveira and starring Doris Duranti, Paulo Gracindo and Dulce Nunes. The film's sets were designed by the art director Lazlo Meitner. It was one of two postwar films Italian star Duranti made in South America alongside the Argentine Alguien se acerca in 1948. Duranti did not appear on screen in her native Italy for several years due to her controversial former relationship with Fascist politician Alessandro Pavolini.

== Cast ==
- Doris Duranti
- Paulo Gracindo
- Dulce Nunes
- Nelson Vaz
- Dorival Caymmi
- José Bia
- Nelly Brasil
- Walyta Brasil
- Fregolente
- Sônia Kaliner
- Ferreira Leite
- Waldir Maia
- João Péricles

== Bibliography ==
- Borghini, Fabrizio, Guidi, Umberto and Sacchetti, Chiara. Livorno al cinema. Informazione, 1997.
- Gundle, Stephen. Mussolini's Dream Factory: Film Stardom in Fascist Italy. Berghahn Books, 2013.
- Moreno, Antônio. Cinema brasileiro: história e relações com o estado. EDUFF, 1994.
