= Haroldo de Andrade =

Brazilian radio presenter

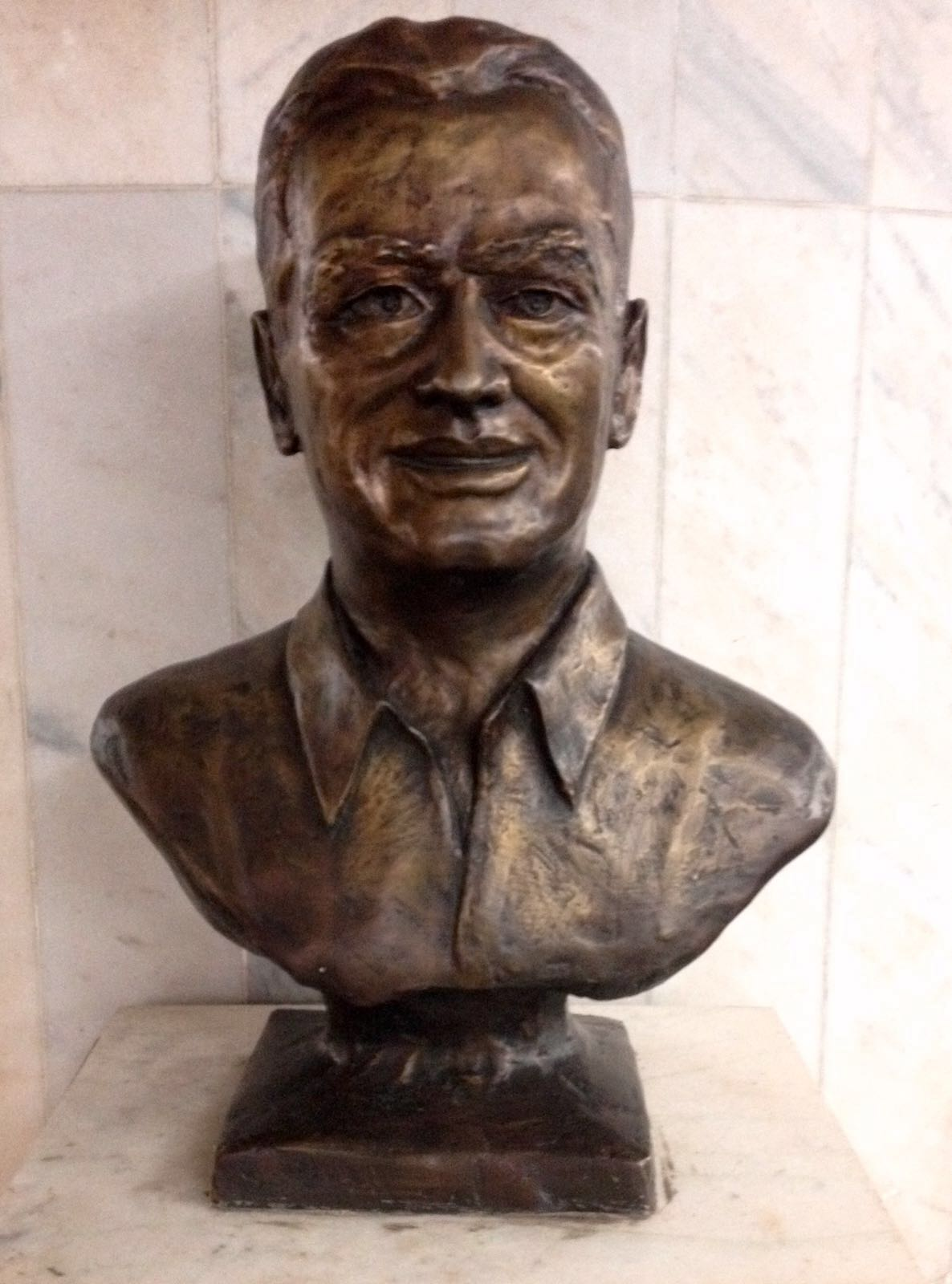
- Portrait of Andrade
- Born: May 1, 1934; Curitiba, Brazil
- Died: March 1, 2008 (aged 73); Rio de Janeiro

Haroldo de Andrade (May 1, 1934 – March 1, 2008) was a Brazilian radio presenter and businessperson. He was best known for his career at Rádio Globo. Andrade died of multiple organ dysfunction syndrome on March 1, 2008, in Rio de Janeiro.
