= John William Kendrick =

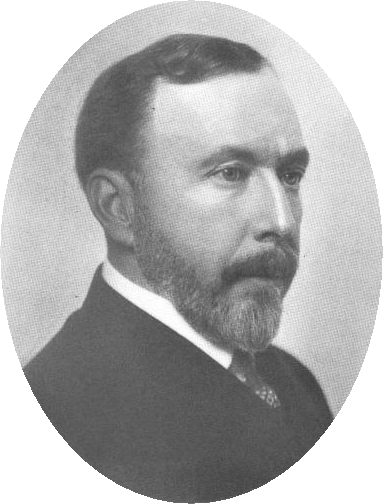
- Born: October 14, 1853; Worcester, Massachusetts
- Died: February 16, 1924 (aged 70)
- Education: Worcester Polytechnic Institute (1873)
- Occupations: Civil engineer, railroad official
- Employer(s): Northern Pacific Railway; Atchison, Topeka and Santa Fe Railway
- Known for: Civil engineering
- Title: Chief engineer, general manager, vice-president, vice-chairman

John William Kendrick (October 14, 1853 – February 16, 1924) was chief engineer, general manager and vice-president of the Northern Pacific Railway and later vice-chairman of the board of the Atchison, Topeka and Santa Fe Railway.

== Biography ==
He was born on October 14, 1853. He entered railway service in 1879 as levelman construction party in Yellowstone River Valley for the Northern Pacific Railroad, since which he has been consecutively 1879 to 1880, location work; 1880 to 1883, in charge of construction of 160 miles of Missouri and Yellowstone divisions; 1883 to 1888, chief engineer, St. Paul and Northern Pacific Railroad, in charge of main line and terminals between Brainerd, Minnesota and St. Paul, Minnesota; 1888 to July, 1893, chief engineer, Northern Pacific Railroad and leased lines; July, 1893, to February 1, 1899, general manager for receivers, same road and reorganized road, the Northern Pacific Railway; February 1, 1899 to date [1901], second vice-president.

From June 5, 1901, to October 4, 1905, Kendrick was third vice-president Atchison, Topeka and Santa Fe Railway, in charge of operation. From October 4, 1905, to June, 1911, he vice-president in charge of operation. From 1911 onwards he was a consulting railway expert.

John William Kendrick was later vice-chairman of the Atchison, Topeka and Santa Fe Railway. In the 1890s he formulated the engineering plans the reconstruction of the Northern Pacific Railway after its construction era, a period during which the Northern Pacific endured two receiverships and corporate reorganizations. At the dawn of the Twentieth Century he joined the Santa Fe, helping usher in an era of scientific management on that road. John William Kendrick played a vital and active role in the construction and formulation of business policies at two of the largest corporations in the American West.

He died on February 16, 1924.
