= Dora Bria =

Brazilian windsurfer (1958–2008)

- Born: 19 July 1958; Rio de Janeiro, Brazil
- Died: 22 January 2008 (aged 49); São Gonçalo do Abaeté, Minas Gerais, Brazil
- Occupation: Windsurfing

Dora Bria (19 July 1958 – 22 January 2008) was a Brazilian six-time windsurfing champion.

Bria was known as a pioneer in Brazilian windsurfing. She won the national championship six times between 1990 and 1995. At the time of her death she held three South American championship titles.

== Biography ==
She was born in Rio de Janeiro to a Brazilian mother and Romanian father.

== Death ==
On 22 January 2008, Bria crashed her pick-up truck, on a rainy Tuesday evening, in Minas Gerais (southeastern Brazil), on her way to her native Rio de Janeiro.
