= Dulcina de Moraes =

Brazilian stage actress and director

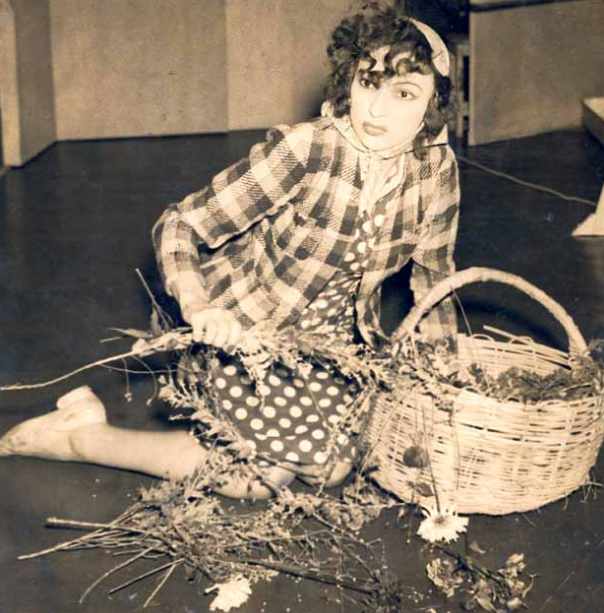
- Dulcina de Moraes (1943)
- Born: February 3, 1908; Valença
- Died: August 28, 1996 (aged 88); Brasília
- Occupation: Actress
- Known for: "First lady" of Brazilian theater

Dulcina de Moraes (February 3, 1908 in Valença — August 28, 1996 in Brasília) was a Brazilian stage actress and director. Founder of the Fundação Brasileira de Teatro, it was later renamed the Faculty of Arts Dulcina de Moraes, in Brasília. She married Odilon Azevedo in 1931. As producer she took part in only one act, Ninotchka (1951).

== Life and career ==
Dulcina de Moraes was the daughter of two great actors of the time, Átila and Conchita de Moraes. Her name was a tribute to her maternal grandmother Dulcina Los Rios Vallina, who was an actress as well. At the age of only one month, Dulcina was already on a scene occupying a cradle instead of a doll. At the age of 15 she debuted at Teatro Trianon in the show Travessuras de Berta, through Companhia Brasileira de Comédia.

In 1925, Dulcina was invited by Leopoldo Fróes, owner of one of the most important theatrical companies of the time, taking the leading role (Jeannine) of stage act Lua Cheia, directed by André Birabeau. Five years later, on July 4, 1930, she married actor and writer Odilon Azevedo. In 1934, together with her husband, she founded Cia. Dulcina-Odilon, responsible for memorable hits on the national theatrical scene. Her company was the first to present to the Brazilian public authors such as García Lorca (Bodas de Sangue), D’Annunzio (A Filha de Iório), Bernard Shaw (César e Cleópatra, Santa Joana, Pigmaleão) and Jean Giraudoux (Anfitrião 38).

She received the Medal of Merit as best actress of the year for lifetime achievement in 1949 from Associação Brasileira de Críticos Teatrais (ABCT). In the movies, she had only one role in the film 24 Horas de Sonho (1941).

In 1955, Dulcina founded the Fundação Brasileira de Teatro, devoting herself entirely to her foundation, first in the building where today the theater that bears her name is located, downtown Rio de Janeiro, and later, in 1972, in Brasília, forming hundreds of actors. That same year she transferred her foundation to Brasília, finally moving to the capital in 1981. On April 21 of that year, she opened the Teatro Dulcina, in Brasília, and on September 18, 1980, the art college Faculdade de Artes Dulcina de Moraes.

Dulcina de Moraes died on August 28, 1996, in Brasília.

== Legacy ==
Brazilian authors also had their turn in the repertoire of Dulcina de Moraes, as Viriato Correia (A Marquesa de Santos), Raimundo Magalhães Júnior (O Imperador Galante) e Maria Jacintha (Convite à Vida, Conflito, Já é Manhã no Mar), among many others .

== Theatre work ==
=== Actress ===
Year	Title	Year	Title	Year	Title
1923	O Discípulo Amado	1923	Zuzu	1923	Travessuras de Berta
1923	Fogo de Vista	1923	Viúva dos 500	1924	As Libélulas do Amor
1925	As Mulheres Não Querem Alma	1925	Partida para Citera	1925	Lua Cheia
1925	O Pulo do Gato	1925	A Melhor Aventura	1926	A Musa do Tango
1926	A Mulher de César	1926	O Homem das Cinco e Meia	1927	Vida e Morte de Santa; Teresinha do Menino Jesus
1929	Chauffeur	1930	Com Amor não se Brinca	1930	O Rei dos Piratas
1930	A Descoberta da América	1930	O Hotel dos Amores	1930	O Homem de Fraque Preto
1930	Amor... Que Praga!	1930	Felicidade	1930	Coitado do Xavier
1931	A Vida É Um Sonho	1931	Um Tostãozinho de Gente	1931	Sorrisos de Mulher
1931	Manhãs de Sol	1931	Casamento a Yankee	1933	As Solteironas dos Chapéus Verdes
1933	Amor	1934	Ela e Eu	1934	Canção da Felicidade
1934	O Último Lord	1934	A Bela e a Fera	1934	Fredaine Vai Casar
1934	Matei!	1934	Bebezinho de Paris	1935	O Pássaro que Foge
1935	No Mundo da Lua	1935	Lê Bonheur	1935	Esta Noite ou Nunca
1935	Mascote	1935	Alegria de Amar	1935	Pancada de Amor
1935	O Nono Mandamento	1936	Mas, Que Pequena!	1936	Noites de Carnaval
1937	Certa Noite em Nova York	1937	Fontes Luminosas	1938	A Mentirosa
1938	O Oficial da Guarda	1938	A Marquesa de Santos	1938	Alegria de Amor
1939	Secretário de Madame	1939	Senhorita Minha Mãe	1939	Grã-Fina
1939	Cara ou Coroa	1939	Zazá	1939	Uma Mulher Livre
1939	Experiência de Amor	1939	A Voz Humana	1939	Conflito
1940	Sinhá Moça Chorou	1941	Os Homens Preferem as Viúvas	1941	As Loucuras de Madame Vidal
1941	Sinfonia Inacabada	1941	Nunca Me Deixarás	1941	A Comédia do Coração
1941	Alvorada	1942	Pigmalião	1942	A Mulher Inatingível
1942	Do Mundo Nada Se Leva	1943	Delírio	1943	Uma Mulher do Outro Mundo
1943	Os Maridos de Vitória	1944	César e Cleopatra	1944	Santa Joana
1944	Bodas de Sangue	1944	Anfitrião 38	1944	Convite à Vida
1944	Deslumbramento	1945	Rainha Vitória	1945	O Pirata
1945	Chuva	1945	Sereia Louca	1946	Avatar
1946	Ana Christie	1947	A Filha de Iório	1948	Já É Manhã no Mar
1948	Águia de Duas Cabeças	1948	A Família e a Festa na Roça	1948	Dona do Mundo
1948	Mulheres	1949	Nossa Querida Gilda	1949	Sorriso de Gioconda
1949	O Bar do Crepúsculo	1949	As Solteironas dos Chapéus Verdes	1949	Anita Garibaldi
1950	Loucuras de Madame Vidal	1950	Chuva	1951	A Doce Inimiga
1952	Vivendo em Pecado	1953	O Imperador Galante	1954	O Homem da Minha Vida
1954	Helena de Tróia	1954	Figueira do Inferno	1955	Leonora (Porto Alegre - RS)
1959	Tia Mame	1963	Tchin-Tchin	1963	Os Sábios se Divertem
1963	Oito Mulheres	1965	Vamos Brincar de Amor em Cabo Frio	1965	O Noviço (Curitiba PR)
1967	O Inspetor Geral	1967	A Ópera dos Três Vinténs	1969	Catarina... da Russia
1970	Como É Que Eu Posso Ouvir Você; Com a Torneira Aberta?	1971	Um Vizinho em Nossas Vidas	1972	Tia Mame (Curitiba PR)
1981	O Melhor dos Pecados	—	—	—	—

=== Director ===
Year	Title	Year	Title	Year	Title
1923	O Discípulo Amado	1923	Viúva dos 500	1924	As Libélulas do Amor
1925	As Mulheres Não Querem Alma	1925	O Pulo do Gato	1925	A Melhor Aventura
1926	A Musa do Tango	1929	Chauffeur	1930	Amor... Que Praga!
1930	Coitado do Xavier	1931	Manhãs de Sol	1933	As Solteironas dos Chapéus Verdes
1935	Lê Bonheur	1935	Mascote	1935	Alegria de Amar
1935	Pancada de Amor	1935	O Nono Mandamento	1936	Mas, Que Pequena!
1936	Noites de Carnaval	1937	Certa Noite em Nova York	1937	Fontes Luminosas
1938	A Mentirosa	1938	O Oficial da Guarda	1938	A Marquesa de Santos
1938	Alegria de Amor	1939	Secretário de Madame	1939	Senhorita Minha Mãe
1939	Grã-Fina	1939	Cara ou Coroa	1939	Zazá
1939	Uma Mulher Livre	1939	Experiência de Amor	1939	A Voz Humana
1939	Conflito	1940	Sinhá Moça Chorou	1941	Os Homens Preferem as Viúvas
1941	As Loucuras de Madame Vidal	1941	Sinfonia Inacabada	1941	Nunca Me Deixarás
1941	A Comédia do Coração	1941	Alvorada	1942	Pigmalião
1942	A Mulher Inatingível	1942	Do Mundo Nada Se Leva	1943	Delírio
1943	Uma Mulher do Outro Mundo	1943	Os Maridos de Vitória	1944	Santa Joana
1944	Anfitrião 38	1944	Convite à Vida	1944	Deslumbramento
1945	Rainha Vitória	1945	O Pirata	1945	Chuva
1945	Sereia Louca	1946	Avatar	1946	Ana Christie
1947	A Filha de Iório	1948	Já É Manhã no Mar	1948	Chuva
1948	Águia de Duas Cabeças	1948	A Família e a Festa na Roça	1948	Dona do Mundo
1948	Mulheres	1949	Nossa Querida Gilda	1949	Sorriso de Gioconda
1949	O Bar do Crepúsculo	1949	As Solteironas dos Chapéus Verdes	1949	Anita Garibaldi
1950	As Árvores Morrem em Pé	1950	oucuras de Madame Vidal	1951	A Doce Inimiga
1951	Ninotchka	1951	Irene	1953	O Imperador Galante
1954	Os Inocentes	1954	O Homem da Minha Vida	1954	Helena de Tróia
1954	Figueira do Inferno	1955	Porto Alegre RS - Leonora	1958	O Processo de Jesus
1959	Tia Mame	1960	Auto da Compadecida	1960	A Compadecida
1962	Tia Mame	1962	Chuva	1964	Tia Mame (Curitiba PR)
1964	Você Pode Ser um Assassino	1965	O Noviço (Curitiba PR)	1966	Senhora da Boca do Lixo
1966	Senhora na Boca do Lixo	1970	O Comprador de Fazendas	1971	Um Vizinho em Nossas Vidas
1972	Tia Mame (Brasília - DF)	—	—	—	—

== See also ==
- List of people on stamps of Brazil
