= Lewis Brian Adams =

English painter

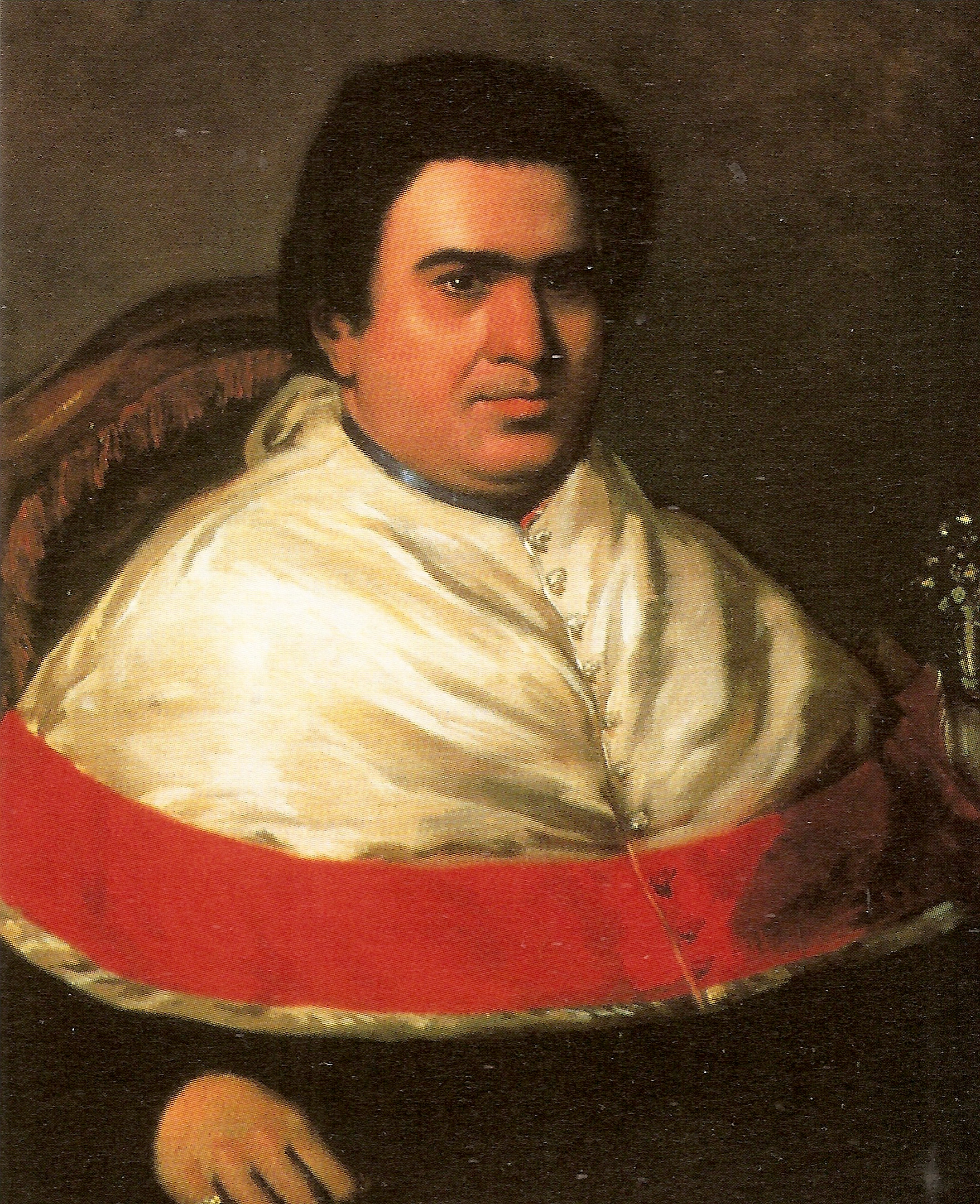
Bishop Juan H. Bosset Castillo. 1844 Oil / canvas. National Art Gallery Collection, Caracas - Venezuela

Lewis Brian Adams (1809 – 27 June 1853) was an English painter who spent most of his career in Venezuela. He studied at the Royal Academy of Arts in London and exhibited there for a number of years. Why he went to Caracas is unknown, but it seems likely that it was to paint in a market where he would find less competition. He introduced a number of trends from English portraiture to the world of Venezuelan art.

Adams became acquainted with the Prussian painter Ferdinand Bellermann during the latter's time in Venezuela.
