= Hélio Quaglia Barbosa =

Helio Quaglia Barbosa
- Born: 25 November 1941
- Died: 1 February 2008 (aged 66)

Hélio Quaglia Barbosa (25 November 1941 – 1 February 2008) was a Brazilian who served on the country's Superior Court of Justice, Brazil's highest appellate court for non-constitutional issues. Barbosa died in Sao Paulo, Brazil, at the age of 66, of multiple organ failure on 1 February 2008.
