= Paulo Gracindo =

Brazilian actor (1911–1995)

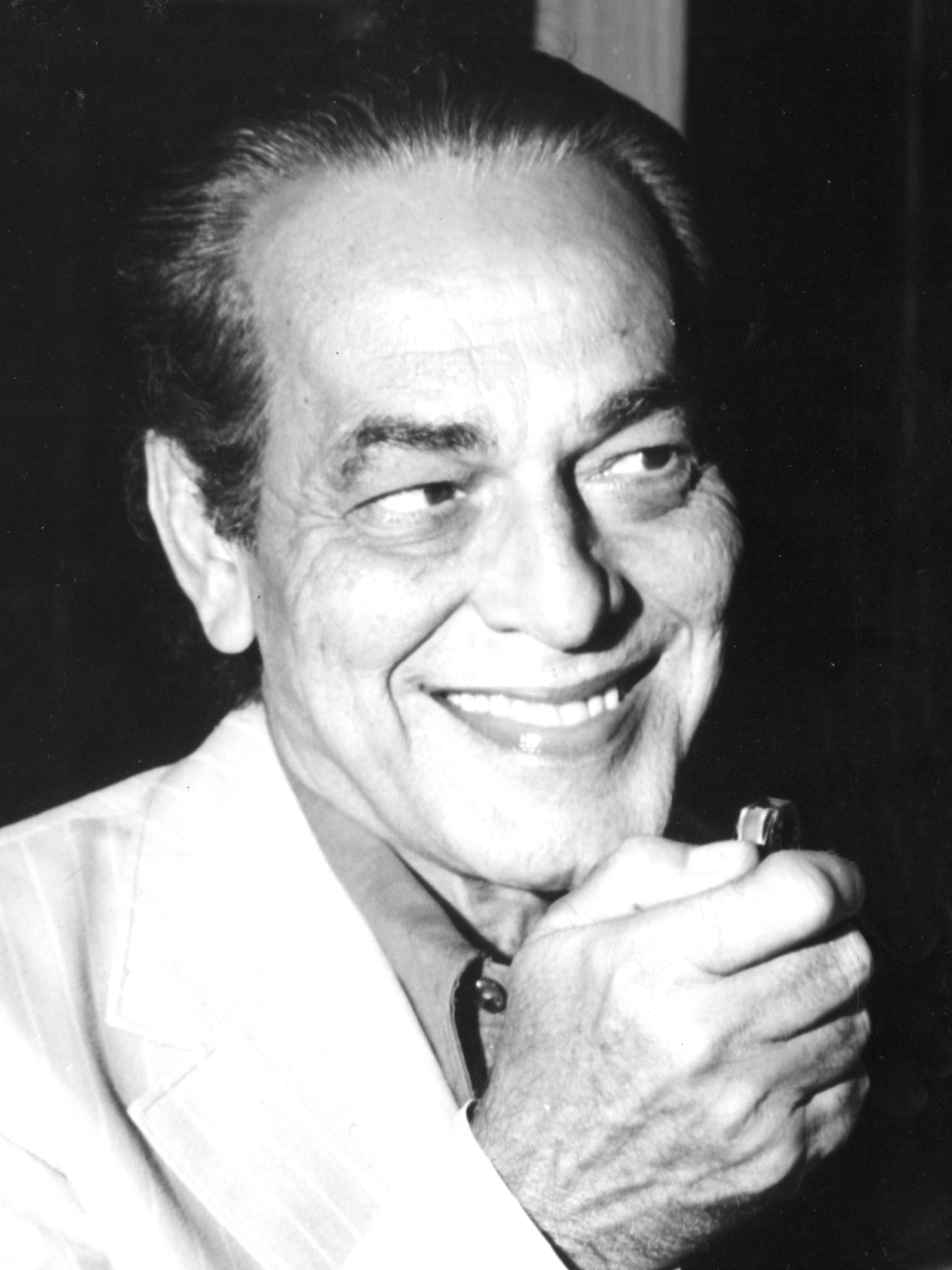
- Paulo Gracindo in 1972
- Born: 16 June 1911; Rio de Janeiro, Brazil
- Died: 4 September 1995 (aged 84)
- Occupation: Actor
- Years active: 1937–1993
- Children: 4, including Gracindo Júnior

Pelópidas Guimarães Brandão Gracindo (16 June 1911 – 4 September 1995), known as Paulo Gracindo, was a Brazilian actor.

== Partial filmography ==
- João Ninguém (1936)
- Tererê Não Resolve (1938)
- Está Tudo Aí (1939) - Batista
- Onde Estás Felicidade? (1939) - André
- Anastácio (1939) - Azevedo
- 24 Horas de Sonho (1941)
- O Dia é Nosso (1941) - Campos
- Morning Star (1950)
- Balança Mas Não Cai (1953)
- De Pernas Pro Ar (1956)
- Copacabana Palace (1962) - (uncredited)
- A Falecida (1965) - João Guimarães Pimentel
- Tarzan and the Great River (1967) - Professor
- Terra em Transe (1967) - Don Julio Fuentes
- Na Mira do Assassino (1967) - Promoter
- Cara a Cara (1967) - Hugo Castro
- O Bravo Guerreiro (1968) - Pericles
- Copacabana Me Engana (1968) - Alfeu
- Antes, o Verão (1968) - Father-in-Law
- Salário Mínimo (1970) - Roberto
- O Bem Amado (1973) - Odorico Paraguaçu
- Tudo Bem (1978) - Juarez Ramos Barata
- Amor Bandido (1978) - Galvão
- Exu-Piá, Coração de Macunaíma (1986)
- Rainha da Sucata (1990) - Betinho Figueroa
- Deus Nos Acuda (1992) - Ambassador Harold Cross
- Mulheres de Areia (1993) - Father
- O Besouro e a Rosa (1993) - Costa (final appearance)
