= 1941 in Brazilian football =

Football in Brazil
- Season: 1941

The following article presents a summary of the 1941 football (soccer) season in Brazil, which was the 40th season of competitive football in the country.

== Campeonato Paulista ==
Final Standings

Position	Team	Points	Played	Won	Drawn	Lost	For	Against	Difference
1	Corinthians	35	20	16	3	1	61	17	44
2	São Paulo	31	20	13	5	2	55	32	23
3	Palestra Itália-SP	30	20	12	6	2	44	19	25
4	Portuguesa	20	20	7	6	7	43	46	-3
5	Santos	20	20	8	4	8	59	60	-1
6	São Paulo Railway	18	20	7	4	9	48	53	-5
7	Hespanha	18	20	8	2	10	48	57	-9
8	Portuguesa Santista	15	20	4	7	9	41	43	-2
9	Ypiranga-SP	14	20	5	4	11	49	52	-3
10	Juventus	14	20	5	4	11	32	49	-17
11	Comercial-SP	5	20	1	3	16	27	76	-52

Corinthians declared as the Campeonato Paulista champions.

== State championship champions ==
State	Champion	State	Champion
Acre	-	Paraíba	Treze
Alagoas	CSA	Paraná	Coritiba
Amapá	-	Pernambuco	Sport Recife
Amazonas	Nacional	Piauí	Botafogo-PI
Bahia	Galícia	Rio de Janeiro	Icaraí
Ceará	Ceará	Rio de Janeiro (DF)	Fluminense
Espírito Santo	Rio Branco-ES	Rio Grande do Norte	ABC
Goiás	-	Rio Grande do Sul	Internacional
Maranhão	Maranhão	Rondônia	-
Mato Grosso	-	Santa Catarina	Figueirense
Minas Gerais	Atlético Mineiro	São Paulo	Corinthians
Pará	Tuna Luso	Sergipe	Riachuelo

== Other competition champions ==
Competition	Champion
Campeonato Brasileiro de Seleções Estaduais	São Paulo

== Brazil national team ==
The Brazil national football team did not play any matches in 1941.
