= Natural wine =

Production of wine using simple or traditional methods

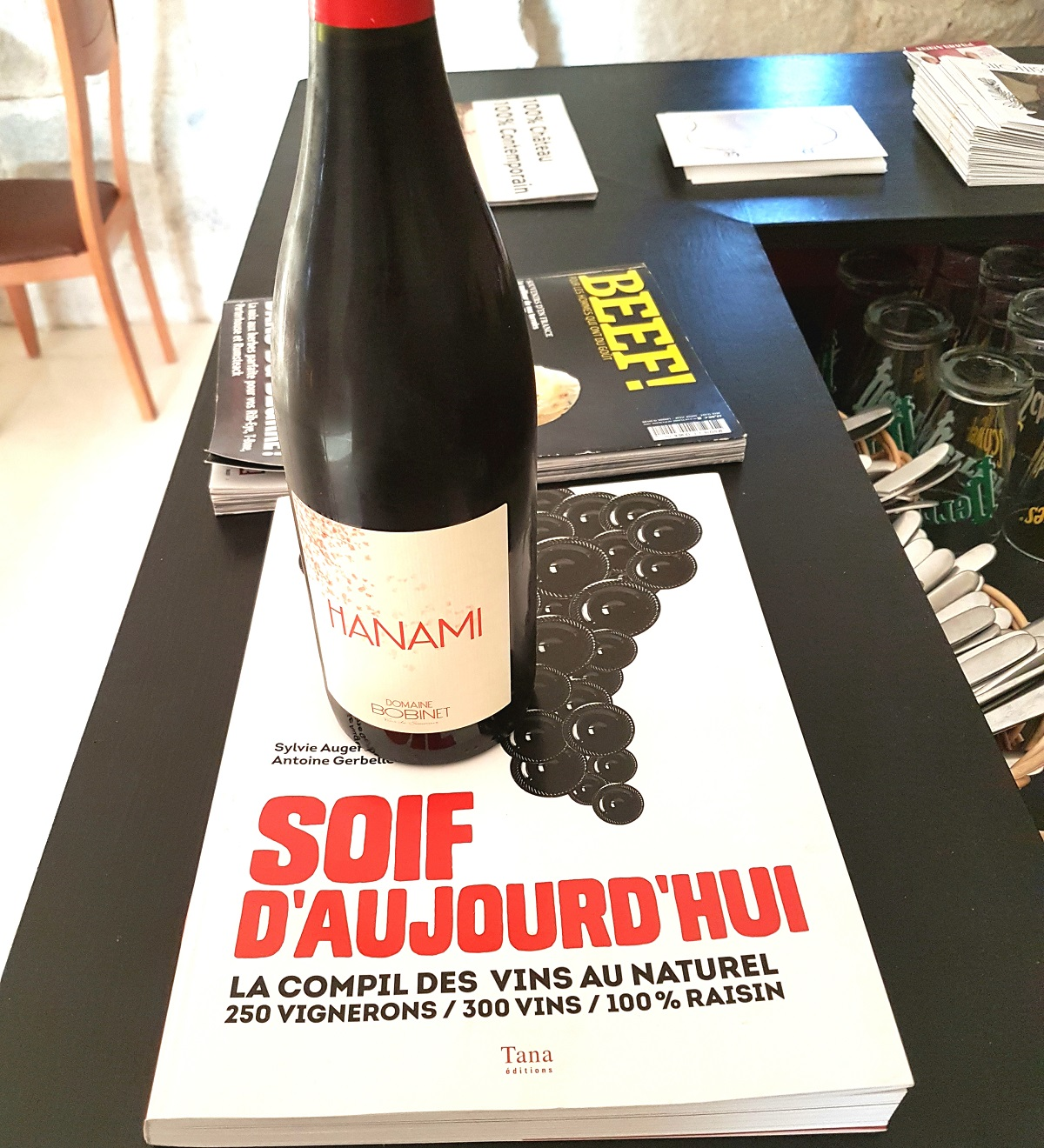
Bottle of natural wine

Natural wine (French: vin naturel, vin nature; Georgian: ბუნებრივი ღვინო (bunɛbrivi ɣvino); German: Naturwein; Italian: vino naturale) refers to a generalized movement among winemakers for production of wine using simple or traditional methods. Although there is no uniform definition of natural wine, it is usually produced using grapes that are farmed without the use of pesticides or herbicides, with no additives other than limited to no SO_{2} (sulfur dioxide), and limited to no filtration and fining. Typically, natural wine is produced on a small scale using traditional rather than industrial techniques and fermented with native yeast. In its purest form, natural wine is simply fermented grape juice with no additives.

== History ==
Some sources claim that the movement started with winemakers in the Beaujolais region of France in the 1960s. Several winemakers, namely Marcel Lapierre, Jean Foillard, Charly Thevenet, and Guy Breton, sought a return to the way their grandparents made wine, before the incursion of pesticides and synthetic chemicals that had become so prevalent in agriculture after the end of World War II. They became affectionately known as the Gang of Four. They were heavily influenced by the teachings and thoughts of Jules Chauvet and Jacques Neauport, two oenologists who studied ways to make wines with fewer additives. For quite some time the town of Villié-Morgon became a place for like minded winemakers to congregate and become influenced by the Gang of Four. Gradually this movement spread to other regions of France, and since has spread across the world, gradually gaining in popularity and attracting newer younger winemakers in more and more regions of the world.

Traditional natural winemaking practices exist in various regions. Historically, natural wine has been connected to the German Lebensreform movement, where it gained popularity in the late 19th and early 20th centuries.

In Georgia some authors are drawing connection between contemporary natural wine making movement and the writings of the Georgian author Ilia Chavchavadze. In the end of 19th century poet and politician, Ilia Chavchavadze penned a series of articles responding to contemporary critics of "backward" natural winemaking practices, later collected and published under the title Georgian Winemaking. Some of famous quotes from the letters of Chavchavadze are: ..."The true purpose of winemaking, its beginning and end, is to make wine naturally, following the process by which nature itself transforms grape juice into wine"..."The primary virtue of every kind of food or drink must be to benefit the body, and not to harm it. Can transforming grape juice through artificial adulterants really be so attractive as to justify dispensing with our way of winemaking, which is focused on purity, on ensuring that the juice is not damaged by any additives, and on preserving the wine's own natural character?"

== Regulations and legal definition ==
Natural wine historically has lacked universal legal definition. Hence, production standards have generally been shaped by producer associations and private certification schemes rather than by national legislations.

However, in 2020 France introduced the voluntary label "Vin Methode Nature", a certification which is developed by natural wine producers but recognized by French Government. The label does not provide a legal definition of natural wine; however, it sets out requirements for vineyard management, fermentation methods and the use of additives.

In 2026, the Parliament of Georgia approved the amendments to the law on "Vine and Wine" where definition of natural wine is introduced. Under this law natural wine (ბუნებრივი ღვინო) is defined as "wine produced through the spontaneous fermentation of organically grown grape must". Also, this law prohibits "the use of oenological practices and substances otherwise permitted under general winemaking regulations, with the exception of sulfur dioxide, which must be limited to a maximum concentration of 40 mg/l".

== Criticism and controversies ==
Natural wine has been the subject of debate within the wine industry, particularly due to the absence of a universally accepted definition and standards. Critics argue that low-intervention practices can lead to greater variation in quality, stability, and consistency between bottles and vintages. Some also point to the presence of sensory characteristics, such an elevated volatile acidity, that are often considered faulty in conventional winemaking. Supporters, however, view these traits as part of the diversity and authenticity of low-intervention wines. The term "natural wine" has also generated discussion regarding its use in marketing, regulation and its distinction from organic and conventional wine production.

== Natural wine market ==
The Natural wine market has grown since the early 2020s. Industry estimates valued the global market at approximately US 2.8 billion in 2025, with further growth projected to reach US $6.1 billion in 2036. The number of venues offering natural wine worldwide has also increased substantially between 2021 and 2024, while demand has been particularly strong in cities such as Paris, Copenhagen, London, New York, Tokyo, Tbilisi. In France, natural wine accounted for about 2% of wine estates in 2024. The growth of natural wine has also been associated with increased demand for locally produced artisanal and organic food products, particularly through natural wine bars and restaurants that emphasize local sourcing and food pairing.

== Bibliography ==
- Feiring, Alice (2008). The battle for wine and love : or how I saved the world from parkerization. Orlando: Harcourt. ISBN 9780151012862. OCLC 166255209.
- Feiring, Alice (2011). Naked wine: letting grapes do what comes naturally. Cambridge, MA: Da Capo Press. ISBN 9780306819537. OCLC 701015445.
- Fukuoka, Masanobu. The One Straw Revolution
- Gómez Pallarès, Joan (2013). Vinos naturales en España : placer auténtico y agricultura sostenible en la copa. Barcelona: RBA. ISBN 9788415541929. OCLC 889927381.
- Goode, Jamie; Harrop, Sam (2011). Authentic wine : toward natural and sustainable winemaking. Berkeley: University of California Press. ISBN 9780520949690. OCLC 750192350.
- Joly, Nicolas (1999). Wine from sky to earth : growing & appreciating biodynamic wine. Austin, Tex.: Acres U.S.A. ISBN 0911311602. OCLC 42464650.
- Legeron, Isabelle; Kingcome, Gavin; Zinonos, Anthony (2014-07-10). West, Caroline (ed.). Natural wine : an introduction to organic and biodynamic wines made naturally. London. ISBN 9781782491002. OCLC 884370524.
- Matthews, Patrick (2000). Real wine : the rediscovery of natural winemaking. London: Mitchell Beazley. ISBN 1840002573. OCLC 44562104.

== Cinematography ==
- Mondovino, by Jonathan Nossiter, 2004
- Résistance naturelle, by Jonathan Nossiter, 2014
- Wine Calling, by Bruno Sauvard, 2018
- Our Blood is Wine, by Emily Railsback, 2018
