= Ferdinando Quaglia =

Italian painter

Ferdinando Quaglia (1780–1853) was an Italian painter of portrait miniatures, who was active in the first years of the 19th century. He painted portraits of Marshal Junot and of the Empress Josephine.
