= 1948 in Brazil =

Events in the year 1948 in Brazil.

== Incumbents ==
=== Federal government ===
- President: Marshal Eurico Gaspar Dutra
- Vice President: Nereu Ramos

=== Governors ===
- Alagoas: Silvestre Pericles
- Amazonas: Leopoldo da Silva Amorim Neves
- Bahia: Otávio Mangabeira
- Ceará: Faustino de Albuquerque
- Espírito Santo: Carlos Fernando Monteiro Lindenberg
- Goiás: Jerônimo Coimbra Bueno
- Maranhão: Sebastião Archer
- Mato Grosso: Arnaldo Estêvão de Figueiredo
- Minas Gerais: Milton Soares Campos
- Pará: Luís de Moura Carvalho
- Paraíba: Osvaldo Trigueiro
- Paraná: Moisés Lupion
- Pernambuco:
  - Otávio Correia de Araújo (until 14 February)
  - Alexandre Barbosa Lima Sobrinho (from 14 February)
- Piauí: José da Rocha Furtado
- Rio de Janeiro: Macedo Soares
- Rio Grande do Norte: José Augusto Varela
- Rio Grande do Sul: Walter Só Jobim
- Santa Catarina: Aderbal Ramos da Silva
- São Paulo: Ademar de Barros
- Sergipe: Jose Rollemberg

=== Vice governors ===
- Ceará: Francisco de Menezes Pimentel
- Espírito Santo: José Rodrigues Sette
- Goiás:
  - Hosanah de Campos Guimarães (until 30 June)
  - Vacant thereafter (from 30 June)
- Maranhão: Saturnino Bello
- Minas Gerais: José Ribeiro Pena
- Paraíba: José Targino Pereira da Costa
- Piauí: Osvaldo da Costa e Silva
- Rio Grande do Norte: Tomaz Salustino
- São Paulo: Luís Gonzaga Novelli Júnior

== Events ==
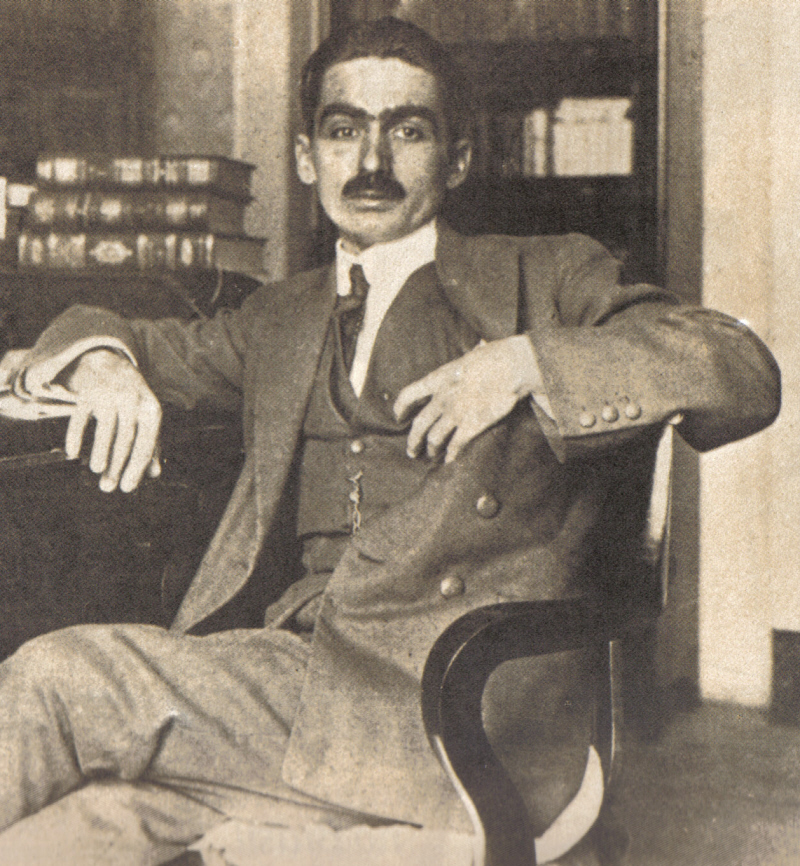
Monteiro Lobato, died 4 July

- date unknown
  - The municipality of Paiçandu is founded by the Companhia de Melhoramentos do Norte do Paraná.
  - The Escola de Arte Dramática (School of Dramatic Art) is founded by Alfredo Mesquita in São Paulo.
  - Opening of the headquarters of the Banco Boavista, designed by Oscar Niemeyer.

=== January ===
- January 7: The Chamber of Deputies approves the project to revoke the mandates of communist parliamentarians.

=== April ===
- April 21: The Center for Petroleum Studies and Defense is created in Rio de Janeiro. This would markthe beginning of the Oil is Ours campaign, opposing the Petroleum Statute that was being processed in the Brazilian Congress.

=== December ===
- December 25: The Samba school GRES Beija-Flor is established.

== Arts and culture ==
=== Books ===
- Alfonso Arinos - Pelo Sertão, with illustrations by Livio Abramo

=== Films ===
- Folias Cariocas, directed by Manoel Jorge and Hélio Thys, starring Dercy Gonçalves.
- Poeira de Estrelas, directed by Moacyr Fenelon and starring Lourdinha Bittencourt and Emilinha Borba.

== Births ==
=== January ===
- January 11: José Scheinkman, economist

=== February ===
- February 16: Ellen Gracie Northfleet, judge

=== March ===
- March 1: Ricardo Kanji, musician (died 2025)
- March 7: Danilo Caymmi, musician, singer, composer and arranger, son of Dorival Caymmi
- March 15: Sérgio Vieira de Mello, UN diplomat (died 2003)

=== June ===
- June 27: Zezé Motta, actress and singer

=== August ===
- August 12: Ana de Hollanda, politician

=== September ===
- September 12: Caio Fernando Abreu, writer (died 1998)

=== December ===
- December 25: Joel Santana, footballer and manager

== Deaths ==
- Date Unknown: Humberto Rosa, painter (born 1908)

=== July ===
- July 4: Monteiro Lobato, writer (born 1882)
- July 22: Sud Mennucci, journalist and educator (born 1882)

=== August ===
- August 27: Oscar Lorenzo Fernández, composer (born 1897)

== See also ==
- 1948 in Brazilian football
- List of Brazilian films of 1948
