= List of Brazilian films of 1946 =

A list of films produced in Brazil in 1946:

Title	Director	Cast	Genre	Notes
A Volta dos Pracinhas	Jurandyr Passos Noronha			
Caídos do Céu	Luiz de Barros	Dercy Gonçalves, Walter D'Ávila, Nelma Costa	Musical comedy	
Fantasma Por Acaso	Moacyr Fenelon	Oscarito, Mário Brasini, Vanda Lacerda	Musical comedy	
Jardim do Pecado	Leo Marten	Adalígia Autran, Cléa Barros, Tamara Capelar	Drama	
No Trampolim da Vida	Franz Eichorn	Jararaca e Ratinho, Cléa Barros, Helmuth Schneider	Drama	
O Cavalo 13	Luiz de Barros	Alvarenga, Marilu Dantas, Jackson De Souza	Romantic comedy	
O Ébrio	Gilda de Abreu	Vicente Celestino, Alice Archambeau, Rodolfo Arena	Musical drama	
Segura Esta Mulher	Watson Macedo	Mesquitinha, Grande Otelo, Humberto Catalano	Musical comedy	
Sob a Luz de Meu Bairro	Moacyr Fenelon	César Ladeira, Milton Carneiro, Humberto Catalano	Drama	

== See also ==
- 1946 in Brazil
