= List of Brazilian films of 1948 =

A list of films produced in Brazil in 1948:

Title	Director	Cast	Genre	Notes
É com Este Que Eu Vou	José Carlos Burle	Oscarito, Grande Otelo, Humberto Catalano	Musical comedy	
E o Mundo se Diverte	Watson Macedo	Oscarito, Grande Otelo, Alberto Ruschel	Musical comedy	
Esta é Fina	Luiz de Barros, Moacyr Fenelon	Mesquitinha, Cláudio Nonelli, Hortência Santos	Musical comedy	
Falta Alguém no Manicômio	José Carlos Burle	Oscarito, Vera Nunes, Modesto De Souza	Comedy	
Fogo na Canjica	Luiz de Barros	Olivinha Carvalho, Orlando Villar, Walter Siqueira	Musical comedy	
Folias Cariocas	Manoel Jorge, Hélio Thys	Aimée, Alvarenga, Gilberto Alves	Musical comedy	
Inconfidência Mineira	Carmen Santos	Rodolfo Mayer, Carmen Santos, Roberto Lupo	Drama	
Mãe	Teófilo de Barros Filho	Alma Flora, Bene Nunes, Manoel Vieira	Drama	
O Palhaço Atormentado	Rafael Falco Filho	Arrelia, Osmano Cardoso, Manuel Inocêncio	Adventure	
Obrigado, Doutor	Moacyr Fenelon	Rodolfo Mayer, Lourdinha Bittencourt, Modesto De Souza	Drama	
Poeira de Estrelas	Moacyr Fenelon	Lourdinha Bittencourt, Emilinha Borba, Colé Santana	Musical comedy	
Terra Violenta	Edmond F. Bernoudy, Paulo Machado	Anselmo Duarte, Celso Guimarães, Graça	Drama	
Uma Luz na Estrada	Alberto Pieralisi	Carmem Brown, David Conde, Walkíria de Almeida	Drama	

== See also ==
- 1948 in Brazil
