= Luz del Fuego =

Brazilian feminist, naturist, ballerina, striptease artist

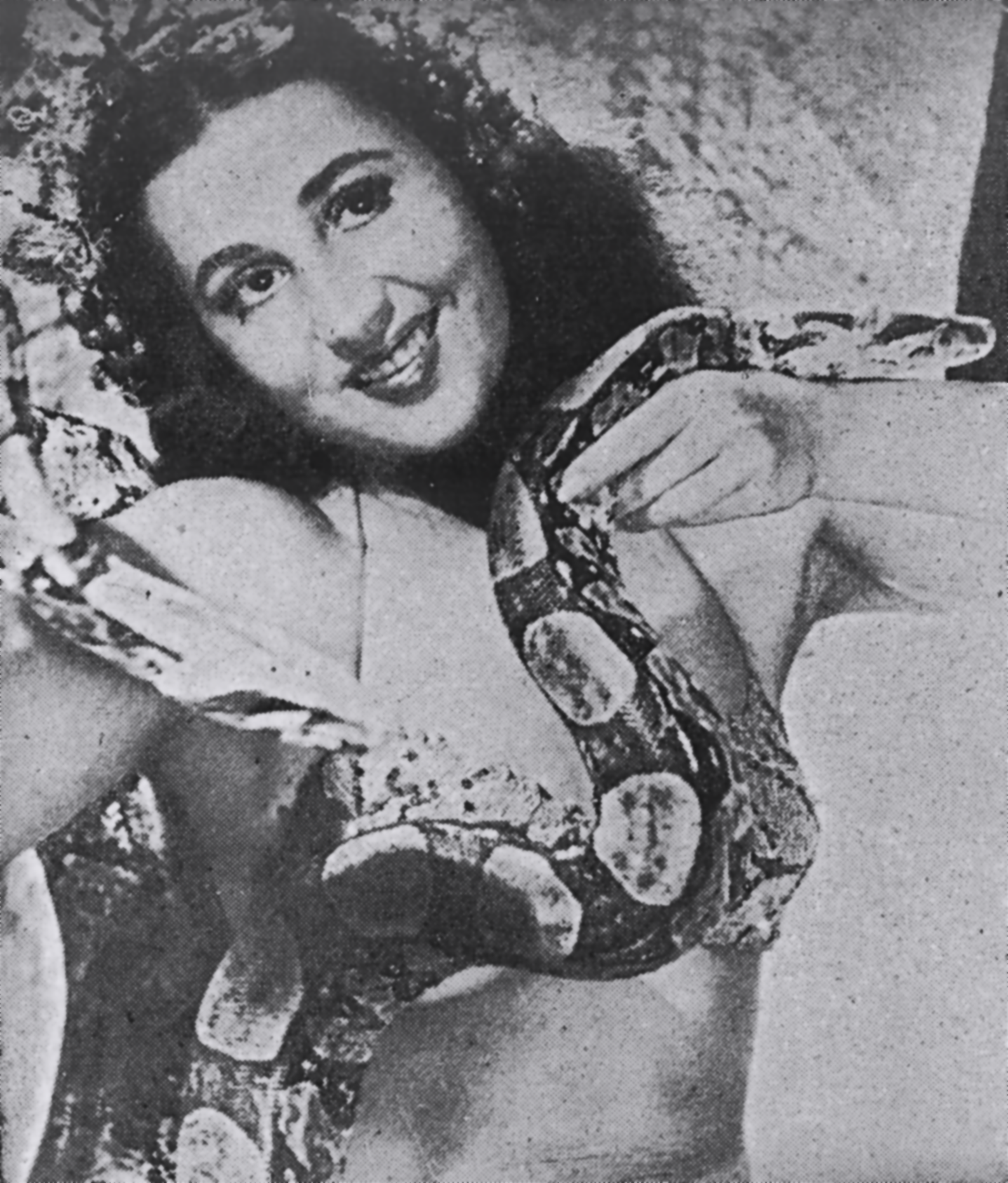
- Luz del Fuego, c. 1946
- Born: Dora Vivacqua; February 21, 1917; Cachoeiro de Itapemirim, Espírito Santo, Brazil
- Died: July 19, 1967 (aged 50)
- Cause of death: Murdered
- Other name: Luz Divina
- Occupation: Ballerina
- Known for: Acting; Dancing nude with snakes; founding Brazil's first nudist club
- Political party: Brazilian Naturist Party
- Movement: Feminism, naturism
- Parents: Antonio Vivacqua; Etelvina Vivacqua

Luz del Fuego (née, Dora Vivacqua; early stage name, Luz Divina; February 21, 1917 – July 19, 1967) was a Brazilian feminist, ballerina, naturist, and striptease artist who performed with live snakes. Comfortable with nudity, she wrapped pythons around her body and became famous in her time.

== Biography ==
Dora Vivacqua was vorn in Cachoeiro de Itapemirim, Espírito Santo. She was the fifteenth child of the Italian immigrants Etelvina and Antonio Vivacqua, and the sister of Senator Attilio Vivacqua. In 1932, her father was murdered by a group of people that, days before, he had expelled from his lands.

After her father's murder, the fifteen-year-old Dora Vivacqua was sent to live with her sister Angélia, whose husband then began to sexually harass her. When caught by his wife, he blamed Dora and convinced the family that she was schizophrenic. As a result, she was hospitalized in Belo Horizonte for two months in 1936. After her release, Vivacqua had lost 10 kg. Her brother Achilles, who was worried about her health after her time in the asylum, suggested she move to the farm of another brother, Archilau. At the farm, she caused controversy by mingling with the lower-class farmhands and appearing onstage at an event for the farmworkers dressed as "Eve" - with grape vines on her breasts and pubis, and carrying two vine snakes. When Archilau scolded her for soiling the family name, Dora assaulted him. She was hospitalized again, this time in Rio de Janeiro.

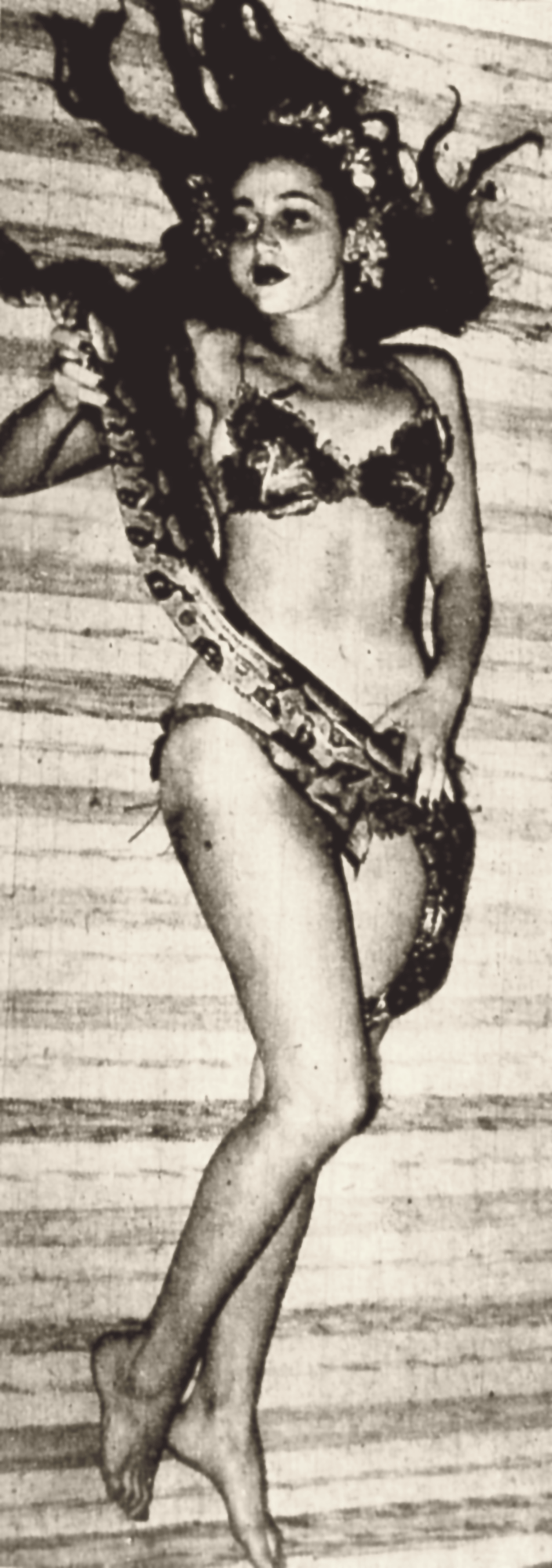
Luz del Fuego, 1944

In 1944, she began performing as a dancer using the stage name "Luz Divina", changing it to Luz del Fuego in 1947, the name of a lipstick in the Argentine market. In 1946, she appeared in Franz Eichhorn's film No Trampolim da Vida, and the following year, starred in Luis Moglia Barth's Argentine-Brazilian co-production Não Me Digas Adeus. In 1948, she appeared in Moacyr Fenelon's musical comedy Poeira de Estrelas opposite Lourdinha Bittencourt and Emilinha Borba, and also had a role in Manoel Jorge and Hélio Thys's musical comedy Folias Cariocas.

On the Ilha do Sol (Sun Island), she established the first naturist club in Brazil, the "Brazilian Naturist Club". In the early 1950s, she founded a political party called the Brazilian Naturist Party and ran for Congresswoman for this party. She lost the election as her brother, Attilio, denied the party's official establishment. In 1956, she made an appearance in Curt Siodmak's Curucu, Beast of the Amazon which was being filmed in rural Argentina, and in 1959 starred in Al Ghiu's comedy picture Comendo de Colher. Del Fuego had a final role, which went uncredited, in Robert Day's Tarzan and the Great River in 1967 before she was murdered by a fisherman that year whom she had threatened to denounce for overfishing.

== Legacy ==
Her life was portrayed in the 1982 film, Luz del Fuego, directed by David Neves and featuring Lucélia Santos in the lead role. In November 2013, a lost documentary titled A Nativa Solitária was found by the Espírito Santo Public Archive and restored by it. Because of her courage to face the prejudice of her time with regard to nudity, and for pioneering the creation of the first naturist club in Brazil, her birth date, February 21, is remembered and celebrated among Brazilian naturists as "Day of Naturism".
