= Trio de Ouro =

Brazilian vocal group

Trio de Ouro (Gold Trio) was a Brazilian vocal group formed by Herivelto Martins in 1937. They performed regularly at the Cassino da Urca. The trio was composed of two men and one woman, who, through the years, included Dalva de Oliveira, Noemi Cavalcante (briefly), Lourdinha Bittencourt (until her death), and finally, Shirley Dom.

== Successes ==
- A Bahia Te Espera, Chianca de Garcia with Herivelto Martins (1950)
- Alvorada, E. J. Moreira and Príncipe Pretinho (1939)
- Alvorada de Luz, Paulo Marques and Pedro de Almeida (1952)
- Ave-Maria, Jaime Redondo and Vicente Paiva (1950)
- Ave Maria no Morro, Herivelto Martins (with Fon-Fon and Sua Orquestra 1942)
- Bom Dia, Avenida, Grande Otelo and Herivelto Martins (1944)
- Boca Fechada, Lupicínio Rodrigues (1954)
- Calado Venci, Ataulfo Alves and Herivelto Martins (with Raul & Regional, 1947)
- Caminho Certo, David Nasser and Herivelto Martins (1950)
- Conversando com a Chuva, Pedro de Almeida (1952)
- E Não Sou Baiano, Waldemar Ressurreição (with Regional de Benedito Lacerda, 1945)
- Lá em Mangueira, Heitor dos Prazeres and Herivelto Martins (1943)
- Lamento Negro, Humberto Porto and Secundino (1940)
- Laurindo, Herivelto Martins (1943)
- Maria louca, David Nasser and Herivelto Martins (1953)
- Mironga de Moça Branca, Gastão Viana (1954)
- Morro, Dunga and Herivelto Martins (1944)
- Negro Telefone, David Nasser and Herivelto Martins (1953)
- O Bonde de Santa Teresa, Waldemar Ressurreição (1952)
- Odete, Dunga and Herivelto Martins (1944)
- Praça XI, Grande Otelo and Herivelto Martins (with Castro Barbosa and Regional de Benedito Lacerda, 1941)
- Quem Vem Descendo, Príncipe Pretinho (1944)
- Recife, Antônio Maria (1951)
- Saudade de Mangueira, Herivelto Martins (1954)
- Senhor do Bonfim, Herivelto Martins (1947)
- Teu Exemplo, David Nasser e Herivelto Martins (1950)

== Filmography ==
- Samba em Berlim
- Berlim na Batucada
- Pif-Paf
- Caídos do Céu
- Esta É Fina
- Fogo na Canjica
- Pra Lá de Boa
- Agüenta Firme, Isidoro
- Está com Tudo
- Com a Mão na Massa
- Samba na Vila
- Guerra ao Samba
- Um Pirata do Outro Mundo
- É de Chuá
