= 1948 São Paulo FC season =

São Paulo
1948 season
- Chairman: Paulo Machado de Carvalho
- Manager: Vicente Feola
- Campeonato Paulista: Champions

The 1948 football season was São Paulo's 19th season since the club's founding in 1930.

== Overall ==
Games played	45 (20 Campeonato Paulista, 25 Friendly match)
Games won	29 (16 Campeonato Paulista, 13 Friendly match)
Games drawn	6 (2 Campeonato Paulista, 4 Friendly match)
Games lost	10 (2 Campeonato Paulista, 8 Friendly match)
Goals scored	103
Goals conceded	52
Goal difference	+51
Best result	8–0 (H) v Juventus – Campeonato Paulista – 1948.11.13
Worst result	0–3 (A) v Atlético Mineiro – Friendly match – 1948.05.27
Most appearances	
Top scorer	

Source: São Paulo FC

== Friendlies ==
January 11 International	São Paulo (Brazil)	2–2	(Argentina) River Plate	São Paulo
	Goal		Goal	Stadium: Estádio Paulo Machado de Carvalho (Pacaembu)

January 28 International	São Paulo (Brazil)	0–1	(Argentina) Boca juniors	São Paulo
			Goal	Stadium: Estádio Paulo Machado de Carvalho (Pacaembu)

February 1 National	Guarani	2–4	São Paulo	Campinas
	Goal		Goal

February 15 National	São Paulo	6–0	XV de Piracicaba	São Paulo
	Goal			Stadium: Estádio Conde Rodolfo Crespi (Rua Javari)

March 21 National	Taubaté	3–1	São Paulo	Taubaté
	Goal		Goal	Stadium: Campo do Bosque

March 28 Taça São-Paulinos	Novo Horizonte	1–4	São Paulo	Novo Horizonte
	Goal		Goal

April 4 Taça Casanova	Barretos	0–2	São Paulo	Barretos
			Goal

April 7 National	São Paulo	3–0	Fluminense	São Paulo
	Goal			Stadium: Estádio Paulo Machado de Carvalho (Pacaembu)

April 11 Taça Dr. José Fortes	São Joaquim	1–3	São Paulo	São Joaquim da Barra
	Goal		Goal

April 14 National	São Paulo	1–0	São Cristóvão	São Paulo
	Goal			Stadium: Estádio Paulo Machado de Carvalho (Pacaembu)

April 18 National	América-SP	0–3	São Paulo	São José do Rio Preto
			Goal	Stadium: Estádio Mário Alves Mendonça

April 21 National	Francana	2–1	São Paulo	Franca
	Goal		Goal

April 24 National	Juventus	2–0	São Paulo	São Paulo
	Goal			Stadium: Estádio Conde Rodolfo Crespi (Rua Javari)

May 18 National	São Paulo	2–1	Vasco da Gama	São Paulo
	Goal		Goal	Stadium: Estádio Paulo Machado de Carvalho (Pacaembu)

May 25 International	São Paulo (Brazil)	4–2	(England) Southampton	São Paulo
	Goal		Goal	Stadium: Estádio Paulo Machado de Carvalho (Pacaembu)

May 27 Taça Gerson S. Coelho	Atlético Mineiro	3–0	São Paulo	Belo Horizonte
	Goal			Stadium: Estádio Otacílio Negrão de Lima

May 30 Taça Gerson S. Coelho	América	0–0	São Paulo	Belo Horizonte
				Stadium: Estádio Otacílio Negrão de Lima

June 6 Taça Gerson S. Coelho	Vasco da Gama	2–2	São Paulo	Belo Horizonte
	Goal		Goal	Stadium: Estádio Otacílio Negrão de Lima

June 10 Troféu APCC	São Paulo	3–1	Corinthians	São Paulo
	Goal		Goal	Stadium: Estádio Paulo Machado de Carvalho (Pacaembu)

June 27 National	Uberaba	0–2	São Paulo	Uberaba
			Goal	Stadium: Estádio Boulanger Pucci

July 18 National	São Paulo	2–1	Portuguesa
	Goal		Goal

July 28 International	São Paulo (Brazil)	2–2	(Italy) Torino	São Paulo
	Goal		Goal	Stadium: Estádio Paulo Machado de Carvalho (Pacaembu)

October 7 National	São Paulo	1–2	Fluminense	São Paulo
	Goal		Goal	Stadium: Estádio Paulo Machado de Carvalho (Pacaembu)

October 24 National	Vasco da Gama (Pouso Alegre)	3–3	São Paulo	Pouso Alegre
	Goal		Goal	Stadium: Estádio da Lema

November 21 National	Ranchariense	1–6	São Paulo	Rancharia
	Goal		Goal

December 22 National	São Paulo	1–3	Vasco da Gama	São Paulo
	Goal		Goal	Stadium: Estádio Paulo Machado de Carvalho (Pacaembu)

December 29 National	Vasco da Gama	2–0	São Paulo	Rio de Janeiro
	Goal			Stadium: Estádio Vasco da Gama (São Januário)

== Official competitions ==
=== Campeonato Paulista ===
May 9 1	Comercial	2–2	São Paulo	São Paulo
	Goal		Goal	Stadium: Estádio Paulo Machado de Carvalho (Pacaembu)

May 22 2	São Paulo	6–1	Nacional	São Paulo
	Goal		Goal	Stadium: Estádio Paulo Machado de Carvalho (Pacaembu)

June 20 3	São Paulo	1–2	Juventus	São Paulo
	Goal		Goal	Stadium: Estádio Paulo Machado de Carvalho (Pacaembu)

July 3 4	São Paulo	2–0	Portuguesa Santista	São Paulo
	Goal			Stadium: Estádio Paulo Machado de Carvalho (Pacaembu)

July 11 5	Corinthians	0–2	São Paulo	São Paulo
			Goal	Stadium: Estádio Paulo Machado de Carvalho (Pacaembu)

August 1 6	Ypiranga	2–3	São Paulo	São Paulo
	Goal		Goal	Stadium: Estádio Paulo Machado de Carvalho (Pacaembu)

August 15 7	São Paulo	2–1	Palmeiras	São Paulo
	Goal		Goal	Stadium: Estádio Paulo Machado de Carvalho (Pacaembu)

August 22 8	Jabaquara	0–1	São Paulo	Santos
			Goal	Stadium: Estádio Ulrico Mursa

August 29 9	Portuguesa	0–2	São Paulo	São Paulo
			Goal	Stadium: Estádio Paulo Machado de Carvalho (Pacaembu)

September 4 10	São Paulo	3–2	Santos	São Paulo
	Goal		Goal	Stadium: Estádio Paulo Machado de Carvalho (Pacaembu)

September 12 11	São Paulo	2–0	Jabaquara	São Paulo
	Goal			Stadium: Estádio Paulo Machado de Carvalho (Pacaembu)

September 19 12	São Paulo	3–0	Comercial	São Paulo
	Goal			Stadium: Estádio Paulo Machado de Carvalho (Pacaembu)

October 3 13	Santos	2–1	São Paulo	Santos
	Goal		Goal	Stadium: Estádio Urbano Caldeira (Vila Belmiro)

October 17 14	Portuguesa Santista	0–2	São Paulo	Santos
			Goal	Stadium: Estádio Ulrico Mursa

October 24 15	São Paulo	3–1	Ypiranga	São Paulo
	Goal		Goal	Stadium: Estádio Paulo Machado de Carvalho (Pacaembu)

November 7 16	São Paulo	2–0	Corinthians	São Paulo
	Goal			Stadium: Estádio Paulo Machado de Carvalho (Pacaembu)

November 13 17	São Paulo	8–0	Juventus	São Paulo
	Goal			Stadium: Estádio Paulo Machado de Carvalho (Pacaembu)

November 28 18	Palmeiras	3–3	São Paulo	São Paulo
	Goal		Goal	Stadium: Estádio Paulo Machado de Carvalho (Pacaembu)

December 12 19	São Paulo	2–1	Portuguesa	São Paulo
	Goal		Goal	Stadium: Estádio Paulo Machado de Carvalho (Pacaembu)

December 18 20	Nacional	2–4	São Paulo	São Paulo
	Goal		Goal	Stadium: Estádio Paulo Machado de Carvalho (Pacaembu)

==== Record ====
Final Position	Points	Matches	Wins	Draws	Losses	Goals For	Goals Away	Win%
1st	34	20	16	2	2	54	19	85%
