= 1946 in Brazil =

Events in the year 1946 in Brazil.

== Incumbents ==
=== Federal government ===
- President:
  - José Linhares (until 30 January)
  - Marshal Eurico Gaspar Dutra (from 31 January)
- Vice President: Nereu Ramos (from 31 September)

=== Governors ===
- Alagoas: Antonio Guedes de Miranda
- Amazonas: Siseno Sarmento
- Bahia: João Vicente Bulcão Viana then Guilherme Carneiro da Rocha Marback then Cândido Caldas
- Ceará:
  - till 10 January: Benedito Augusto Carvalho dos Santos
  - 10 January-21 January: Tomás Pompeu Filho
  - 21 January-16 February: Acrísio Moreira da Rocha
  - 16 February-28 October: Pedro Firmeza
  - from 28 October: José Machado Lopes
- Espírito Santo:
  - till 27 February: Octávio de Carvalho Lemgruber
  - 27 February-8 June: Aristides Alexandre Campos
  - 8 June-14 October: Ubaldo Ramalhete Maia
  - from 14 October: Moacir Ubirajara da Silva
- Goiás:
  - till 18 February: Eládio de Amorim
  - 18 February-4 August: Filipe Antônio Xavier de Barros
  - 4 August-18 August: Paulo Fleury da Silva e Sousa
  - 18 August-12 September: Filipe Antônio Xavier de Barros
  - 12 September-22 October: Belarmino Cruvinel
  - from 22 October: Joaquim Machado de Araújo
- Maranhão:
- Mato Grosso: Olegário de Barros then Jose Marcelo Moreira
- Minas Gerais:
  - till 3 February: Nísio Batista de Oliveira
  - 3 February-14 August: João Tavares Corrêa Beraldo
  - 14 August-16 November: Júlio Ferreira de Carvalho
  - 16 November-20 December: Noraldino Lima
  - from 20 December: Alcides Lins
- Pará:
  - till 9 February: Manuel Maroja Neto
  - 9 February-9 December: Otávio Bastos Meira
  - from 9 December: José Faustino Santos
- Paraíba:
  - till 13 February: Severino Montenegro
  - 13 February-20 September: Odon Bezerra Cavalcanti
  - from 20 September: José Gomes da Silva
- Paraná: Clotário de Macedo Portugal then Brasil Pinheiro Machado then Mário Gomes da Silva
- Pernambuco:
  - till 7 February: José Neves Filho
  - 7 February-7 August: José Domingues da Silva
  - from 7 August: Demerval Peixoto
- Piaui: Hugo Silva
- Rio de Janeiro:
  - till 20 March: Benedito Martins Napoleão do Rego
  - 20 March-3 September: José Vitorino Correia
  - 3 September-11 October: Manuel Sotero Vaz da Silveira
  - from 11 October: Teodoro Sobral
- Rio Grande do Norte: Miguel Seabra Fagundes (till 13 February); Ubaldo Bezerra de Melo (from 13 February)
- Rio Grande do Sul: Samuel Figueiredo da Silva

(till 7 February); Pompílio Cylon Fernandes Rosa (from 7 February)

- Santa Catarina: Luís Gallotti (till 8 February); Udo Deeke (from 8 February)
- São Paulo: José Carlos de Macedo Soares
- Sergipe: Hunald Santaflor Cardoso (till 31 March); Antônio de Freitas Brandão (from 31 March)

=== Vice governors ===
- Rio Grande do Norte: no vice governor
- São Paulo: no vice governor

== Events ==
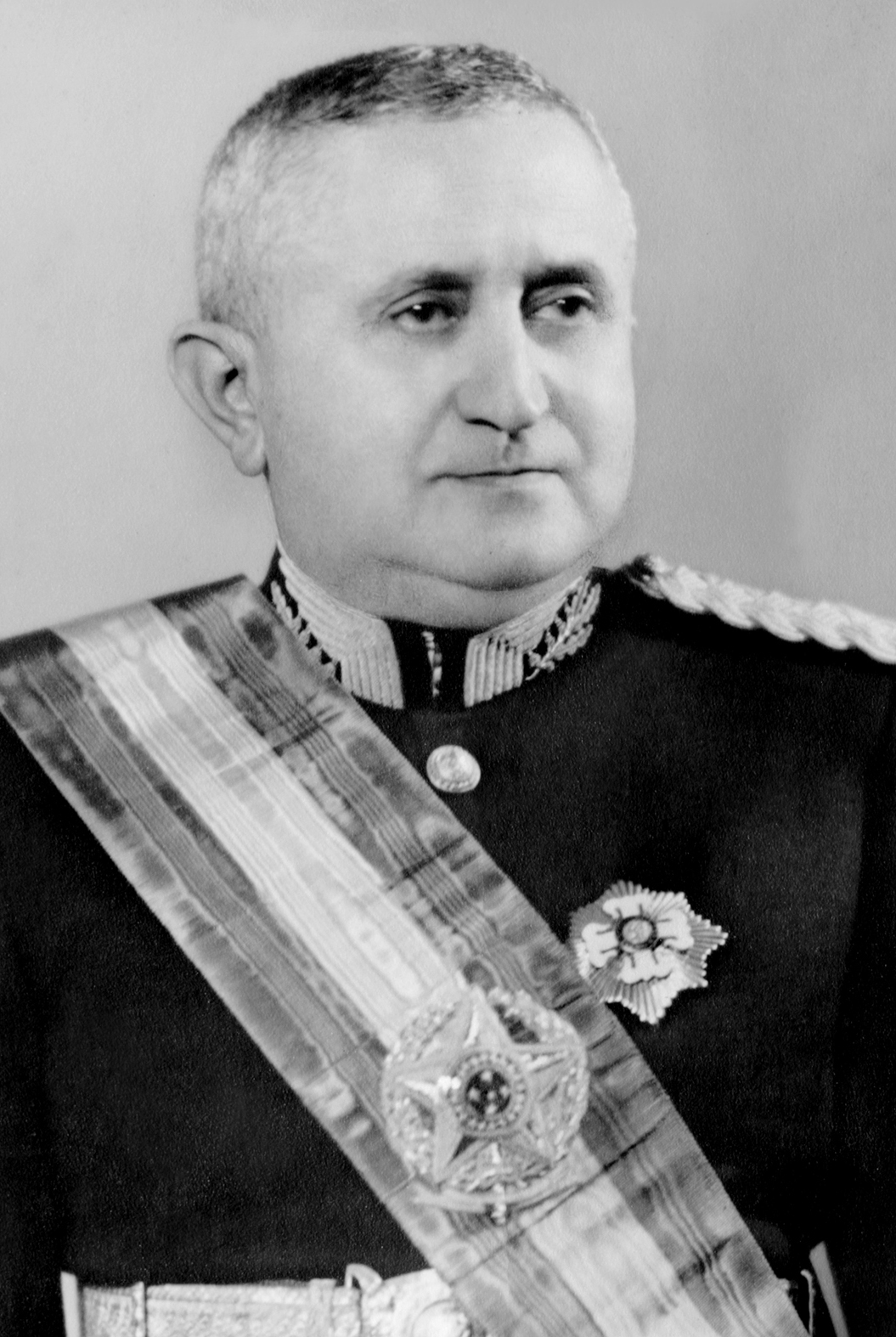
Incoming President Eurico Gaspar Dutra

- 18 September - A new constitution is introduced, and the position of Vice President of Brazil is recreated; Nereu Ramos is selected as the first incumbent.
- date unknown - The new airline, Transportes Aéreos Nacional, is founded (but does not fly until the following year).

== Arts and culture ==
=== Books ===
- Jorge Amado - Seara Vermelha
- Maria José Dupré - Os Rodriguez

=== Drama ===
- Nelson Rodrigues - Álbum de família

=== Films ===
- Caídos do Céu, directed by Luiz de Barros

== Births ==
- 1 January - Rivellino, footballer
- 12 April - Nelson Jobim, politician
- 4 May - Rogério Sganzerla, film director (died 2004)
- 19 May - Carlos Alberto de Barros Franco, pneumologist
- 18 June - Maria Bethânia, singer
- 6 July - Toquinho, singer and guitarist
- 29 September - Celso Pitta, politician (died 2009)
- 2 November - Marieta Severo, actress
- 12 December - Emerson Fittipaldi, racing driver

== Deaths ==
- 9 February - Júlio Prestes, President of Brazil 1927-30 (born 1882)
- 19 May - Francesco Camero Medici, Brazilian-born Italian diplomat (born 1886)
- 15 June – João Batista Becker, German-born Brazilian Roman Catholic prelate, archbishop (born 1870)

== See also ==
- 1946 in Brazilian football
- List of Brazilian films of 1946
