= Nelma (disambiguation) =

Nelma (Stenodus nelma) is commercial freshwater whitefish.

Nelma may also refer to:

- Nelma, Wisconsin, United States
- Nelma Costa (1922–2023), Brazilian actress
- Nelma Crutcher (1950–2022), President General of the United Daughters of the Confederacy
- Teca Nelma (born 1999), Brazilian politician
