= Patrick Boni =

Brazilian footballer

Personal information
- Full name: Patrick Edson Bonifácio
- Date of birth: 4 January 1994 (age 32)
- Place of birth: Rancharia, Brazil
- Height: 1.86 m (6 ft 1 in)
- Position: Forward

Team information
- Current team: Da Nang
- Number: 97

Youth career
- 2011–2014: Osasco Audax

Senior career*
Years	Team	Apps	(Gls)
2014–2015	Tombense	0	(0)
2015	→ Nacional de Muriaé (loan)		
2015	Mirassol		
2016	Grêmio Osasco	0	(0)
2016	Palmas	6	(2)
2017	Campos	0	(0)
2017	Grêmio Prudente		
2018	Batatais	0	(0)
2019–	Da Nang	8	(1)
- * Club domestic league appearances and goals as of 18:02, 26 May 2019 (UTC)

Patrick Edson Bonifácio (born 4 January 1994), commonly known as Patrick Bonifácio or Patrick Boni, is a Brazilian footballer who currently plays as a forward for Da Nang.

== Career statistics ==
=== Club ===
As of 26 May 2019.

Club	Season	League			State League		Cup		Other		Total	
Club	Season	Division	Apps	Goals	Apps	Goals	Apps	Goals	Apps	Goals	Apps	Goals
Tombense	2014	Série D	0	0	0	0	0	0	0	0	0	0
Tombense	2015	Série C	0	0	0	0	0	0	0	0	0	0
Tombense	Total		0	0	0	0	0	0	0	0	0	0
Grêmio Osasco	2016	–			12 (Note: Appearances in the Campeonato Paulista A3)	2	0	0	0	0	12	2
Palmas	2016	Série D	6	2	0	0	0	0	0	0	6	2
Campos	2017	–			1 (Note: Appearances in the Campeonato Carioca)	0	0	0	0	0	1	0
Batatais	2018	–			0	0	0	0	6 (Note: Appearances in the Copa Paulista)	0	6	0
Da Nang	2019	V.League 1	8	1	–		0	0	0	0	8	1
Career total			14	3	13	3	0	0	6	0	33	6

== Personal life ==
Patrick is son of the former footballer Édson Bonifácio.
