= TECA =

TECA may refer to:

- TECA, the original name of the events complex in Aberdeen now known as P&J Live
- Temporary Emergency Court of Appeals, a former US court in operation from 1971 to 1993
- Tartan Educational and Cultural Association, a Scottish organisation that merged into the Scottish Tartans Authority
- Teca Nelma (born 1999), Brazilian politician
