= Édson Bonifácio =

Brazilian footballer

Boni
Personal information
- Full name: Édson Bonifácio
- Date of birth: 8 March 1964 (age 62)
- Place of birth: Palmital, São Paulo, Brazil
- Positions: Centre-back; defensive midfielder

Youth career
- -1982: São Paulo

Senior career*
Years	Team	Apps	(Gls)
1982–1987	São Paulo	35	(0)
1985	→ Santa Cruz (loan)		
1988	Colorado-PR		
1989–1991	Goiás		
1991	Operário-MS		
1992	Barretos		
1993	São Luiz		
1995	Atlético Carazinho		
1998	Santa Cruz-RS		
2000	Rio Grande		
2000	Grêmio Santanense		

International career
1983	Brazil U20		
1983	Brazil U23		

Managerial career
- 2003: Ranchariense
Medal record
Men's football
Representing Brazil
Pan American Games
Silver medal – second place	1983 Caracas	Team
- * Club domestic league appearances and goals as of 26 September 2023

Édson Bonifácio (born 8 March 1964), also known as Boni, is a Brazilian former professional footballer who played as a centre-back and defensive midfielder.

== Career ==
Revealed at São Paulo in 1982, he spent most of his time as a reserve. After leaving the club, he spent time in several other places, most prominently at Goiás EC.

=== International career ===
In 1983, Boni was part of the South American and World Cup champion U20 squads. In August of the same year, he was also part of the team that competed in the 1983 Pan American Games and won the silver medal.

== Personal life ==
Édson is the father of footballer Patrick Boni.

== Honours ==
Brazil U20

- South American U-20 Championship: 1983
- FIFA World Youth Championship: 1983

Brazil U23

- 1983 Pan American Games: (silver) Silver medal

Goiás

- Campeonato Goiano: 1989, 1990, 1991
