= Edu da Gaita =

Brazilian composer and harmonica player (1916–1982)

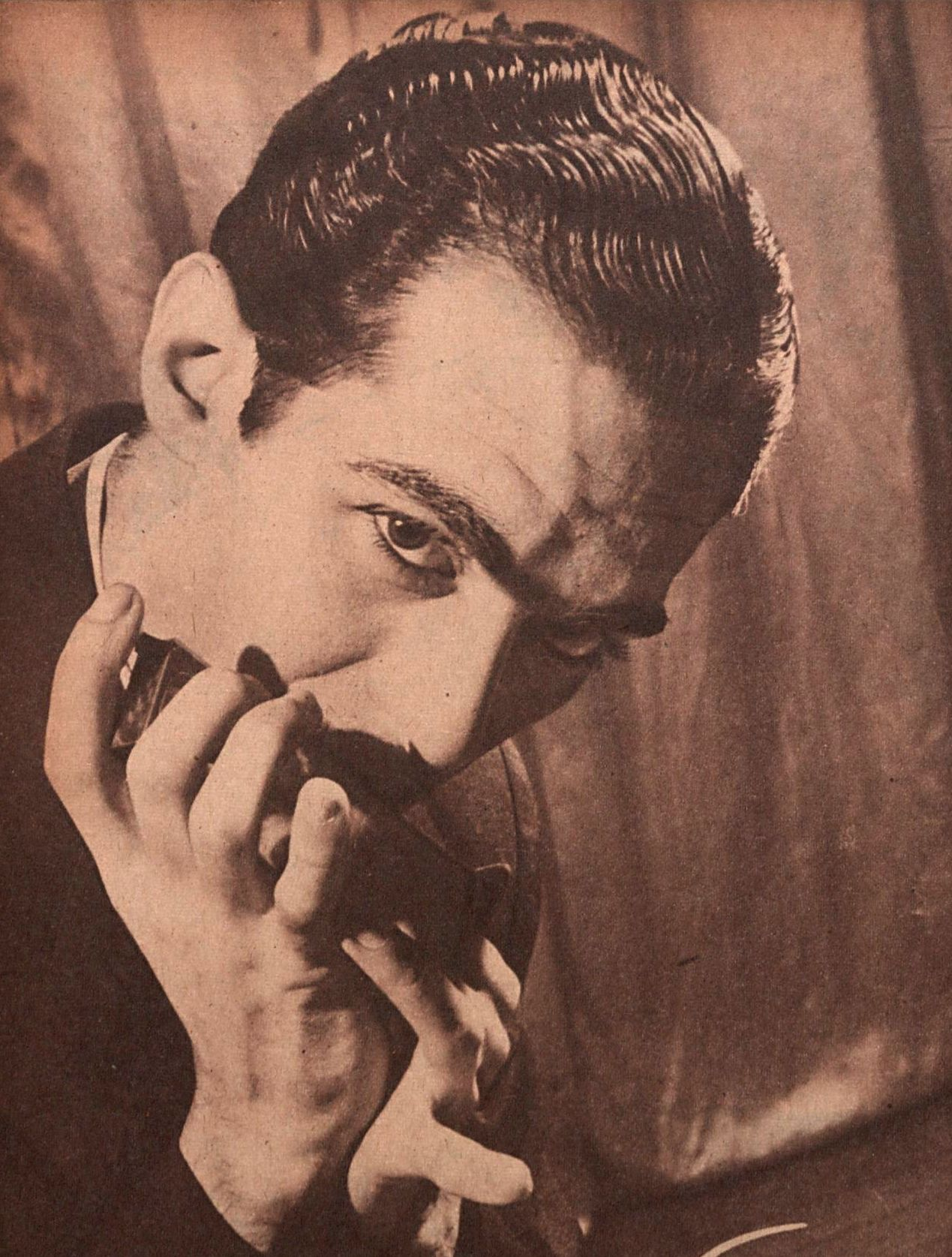
- Edu da Gaita in 1944

Background information
- Born: Eduardo Nadruz; December 13, 1916; Jaguarão, Rio Grande do Sul, Brazil
- Died: August 23, 1982 (aged 65) Rio de Janeiro, Brazil
- Occupations: Composer; harmonica player
- Instrument: Harmonica
- Website: http://www.edudagaita.com.br

Edu da Gaita (lit. Edu of the Harp), born Eduardo Nadruz (December 13, 1916 – August 23, 1982), was a Brazilian musician.

At the end of the 1950s, Radamés Gnattali befriended Edu, composing a concert for harmonica and orchestra dedicated to him and, in 1960, taking him on tour in Europe and South America with his sextet in a government-funded program called III Caravana Oficial de Música Popular Brasileira. The tour was recorded and generated two albums: Radamés na Europa, com seu Sexteto e Edu – vol. 1 and Radamés na Europa, com seu Sexteto e Edu – vol. 2, all by Odeon Records.

In 2022, in his behalf, the state of São Paulo passed a bill declaring August 23 as "Dia Nacional da Gaita e do Gaitista" (National Day of the Harp and the Harp Player).

== Selected filmography ==
- Berlin to the Samba Beat (1944)

== Discography ==
=== Albums ===
- Violino cigano / Canção da Índia (1939) Columbia 78
- Onde o céu azul é mais azul / Cantigas de roda (1941) Columbia 78
- Uma gaita em Sevilha / Velhas melodias (1941) Columbia 78
- Ritmo do Brasil / Fantasia espanhola (1944) Continental 78
- Dança ritual do fogo / Andaluzia (1949) Continental 78
- Poeta e camponês (I) / Poeta e camponês (II) (1949) Continental 78
- Torna a Sorriento / O sole mio (1949) Continental 78
- Capricho nortista (I) / Capricho nortista (II) (1950) Continental 78
- Arabescos / Fumaça nos teus olhos (1950) Continental 78
- Batuque / Juazeiro (1951) Continental 78
- Ritmos de Tio Sam (Parte I) / Ritmos de Tio Sam (Parte II) (1951) Continental 78
- Moto perpétuo / Poema (1952) Continental 78
- Ruby / Numa pequena cidade espanhola (1954) Continental 78
- Le grisby / Damasco (1955) Continental 78
- Uma gaita sobe o morro / Talismã (1955) Continental 78
- Moritat / Domingo sincopado (1956) Continental 78
- Edu em 8 Ritmos/Nola/Brasileirinho (1957) Polydor 78
- Manhã de carnaval / Samba de Orfeu (1959) Copacabana 78
- Uma gaita para milhões (1960) Copacabana LP
- Edu-Ontem e hoje (1965) Philips LP
- Edu da Gaita [S/D] Eldorado CD
