= Bonequinha de Seda =

1936 film

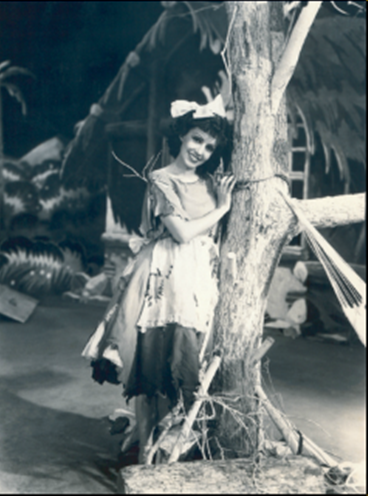
- Still with Gilda de Abreu
- Directed by: Oduvaldo Vianna
- Written by: Oduvaldo Vianna
- Produced by: Adhemar Gonzaga
- Starring: Gilda de Abreu
- Production company: Cinédia
- Distributed by: Cinédia
- Release date: 26 October 1936
- Running time: 1 hr. 55 min.
- Country: Brazil
- Language: Portuguese

Bonequinha de Seda (English: Silk Doll) is a 1936 Brazilian comedy film directed by Oduvaldo Vianna and starring Gilda de Abreu.

== Cast ==
- Gilda de Abreu as Marilda
- Delorges Caminha as João Siqueira
- Conchita de Moraes as Madame Valle
- Darcy Cazarré as Pechincha
- Mira Magrassi as Madame Pechincha
- Apolo Correia as Mesquita
- Carlos Barbosa as Dr. Leitão
