= Pery Ribeiro =

- Born: Peri Oliveira Martins; 27 October 1937; Rio de Janeiro, Brazil
- Died: 24 February 2012 (aged 74) Rio de Janeiro, Brazil
- Genres: Bossa nova, MPB, jazz
- Occupations: Singer, songwriter
- Years active: 1959–2012

Pery Ribeiro (27 October 1937 – 24 February 2012) was a Brazilian singer of bossa nova, MPB and jazz, active from 1959 until shortly before his death.

== Biography ==
Pery Ribeiro was born Peri Oliveira Martins on 27 October 1937, son of the singer Dalva de Oliveira (1917–1972) and singer-songwriter Herivelto Martins (1912–1992).

Ribeiro began his performing career as a child, dubbing the title character in the Walt Disney movie Bambi. In addition, he participated in the incomplete Orson Welles film It's All True. In 1944, Ribeiro appeared as an actor in the musical comedy film "Berlim na batucada", by Luís de Barros. This film was a satire of Orson Welles' passage through Brazil while filming "It's All True" (the same film in which Ribeiro appeared) and the United States' "good neighbor" policy.

Ribeiro's career as a singer did not begin until 1959. Ribeiro was working as a camera operator for TV Tupi, when he was invited to appear on the program of Paulo Gracindo on Rádio Nacional. At this time he assumed the stage name Pery Ribeiro, at the suggestion of César de Alencar (a Brazilian radio announcer, film actor and television host).

In 1960, Ribeiro's mother (a successful and well-established singer), recorded Ribeiro's composition "Não devo insistir". Ribeiro made his first record as a singer in the same year. In 1961, Ribeiro recorded several 78 rpm discs. Among them was a disc featuring the songs "Manhã de Carnaval" and "Samba de Orfeu" by Luiz Bonfá and Antônio Maria, which had been part of the soundtrack of the 1959 film Black Orpheus. In the same year he recorded the song "O Barquinho", by Roberto Menescal and Ronaldo Bôscoli, another song which has become a bossa nova standard. In 1962, Ribeiro recorded his first LP, "Pery Ribeiro e seu mundo de canções românticas" (Pery Ribeiro and his world of romantic songs), accompanied on the guitar by Luíz Bonfá.

Ribeiro was one of the first singers to record the classic bossa nova song "Garota de Ipanema" (The Girl from Ipanema), recording it in January 1963 for Odeon. The song was part of Ribeiro's second LP, "Pery é todo bossa" (Pery is all bossa). In 1965, he appeared on a television special "Gemini V", performing with Leny Andrade and the group Bossa 3 at the club Porão 73. Ribeiro, Andrade and Bossa 3 recorded together several times subsequently. Throughout his career, Ribeiro performed frequently in Mexico and the United States. In 1998, Ribeiro moved to Miami, where he lived until 2011.

In 2006, Ribeiro and his wife, Ana Duarte, co-wrote a memoir of Ribeiro's childhood, early career, and the relationship between his parents, called "Minhas duas estrelas" (My Two Stars). The book became the source of a television miniseries on TV Globo in 2010.

Ribeiro died on 24 February 2012, of a heart attack, in Rio de Janeiro. Shortly before his death, Ribeiro completed work on an album of duets with twenty-two other artists in homage of Wilson Simonal.

== Critical reception ==
In 2012, Ribeiro was ranked among the 100 best Brazilian singers of all time by Rolling Stone Brasil (at #64). The magazine provided the following assessment of Ribeiro's career: "Possibly the most underestimated Brazilian singer, Pery Ribeiro ... became one of the leading voices of bossa nova. ... Skill, precision, refinement, musical intelligence – Pery had all this to spare, and sang all styles."

== Discography ==
- 1965: Gemini V (with Leny Andrade)
- 1967: Gemini V en Mexico (with Leny Andrade)
- 1972: Gemini Cinco Anos Depois (with Leny Andrade)

== Selected filmography ==
- Berlin to the Samba Beat (1944)
