= Herivelto Martins =

Brazilian composer, singer and music player

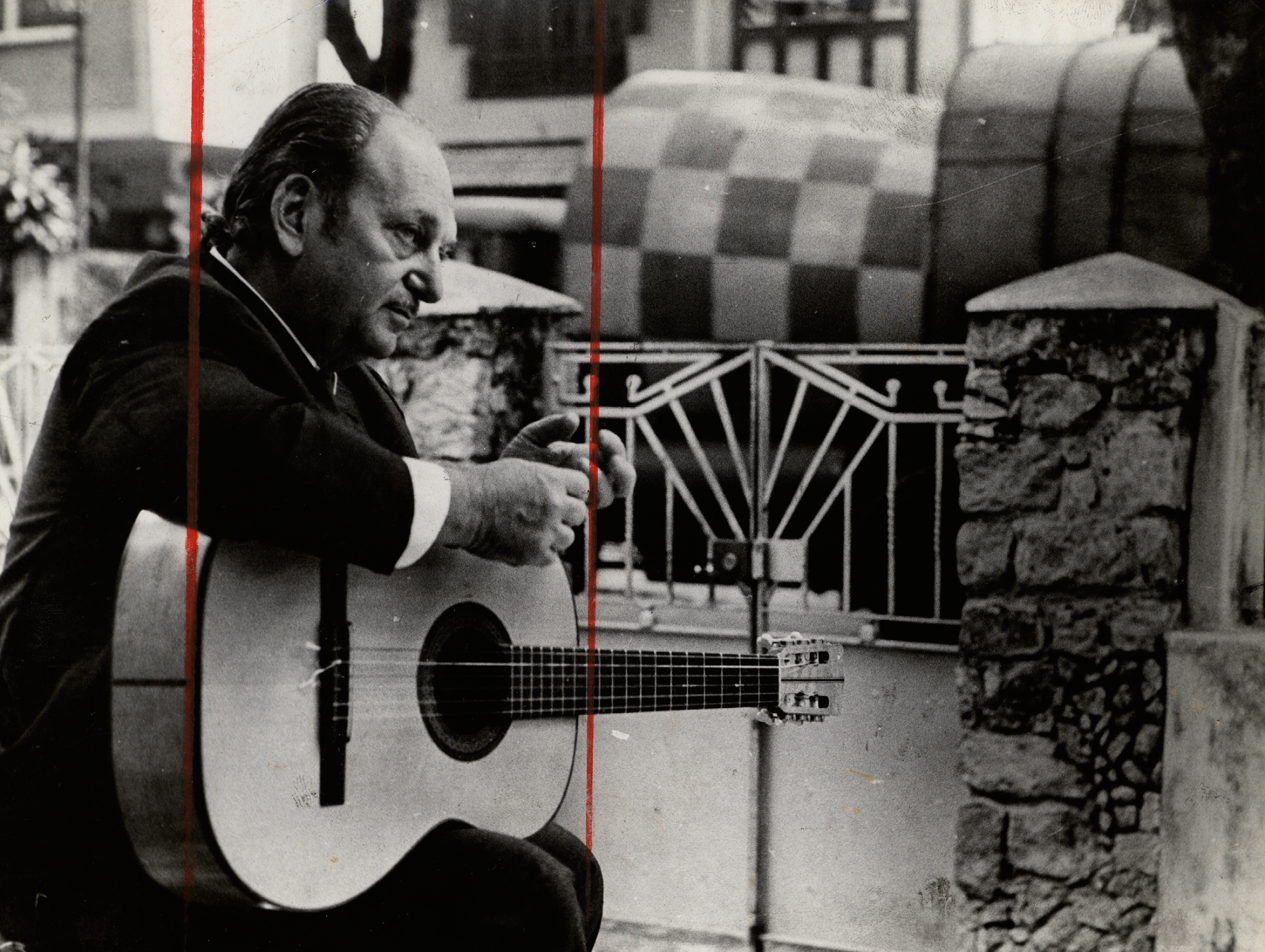
- Herivelto Martins in 1972

Background information
- Born: January 30, 1912; Engenheiro Paulo de Frontin, Brazil
- Died: September 17, 1992 (aged 80) Rio de Janeiro, Brazil
- Genres: Samba
- Formerly of: Preto e Branco; Trio de Ouro
- Spouse: Dalva de Oliveira (m. 1936; sep. 1949)

Herivelto de Oliveira Martins (also Herivelto Martins) (Engenheiro Paulo de Frontin, Brazil, January 30, 1912 – Rio de Janeiro, September 17, 1992) was a Brazilian composer, singer, and musician.

Martins was the author of many classic Brazilian songs, especially sambas. They include:

- "Da cor do meu violão"
- "Ave Maria no Morro"
- "Praça onze"
- "Que rei sou eu?"

Martins formed the Trio de Ouro group in 1936 with his wife, Dalva de Oliveira, and Nilo Chagas. Martins' son, Pery Ribeiro, became a highly successful singer of bossa nova, música popular brasileira and Jazz.

== Selected filmography ==
- Berlin to the Samba Beat (1944)
