= Radamés Gnattali =

Brazilian composer, pianist and conductor

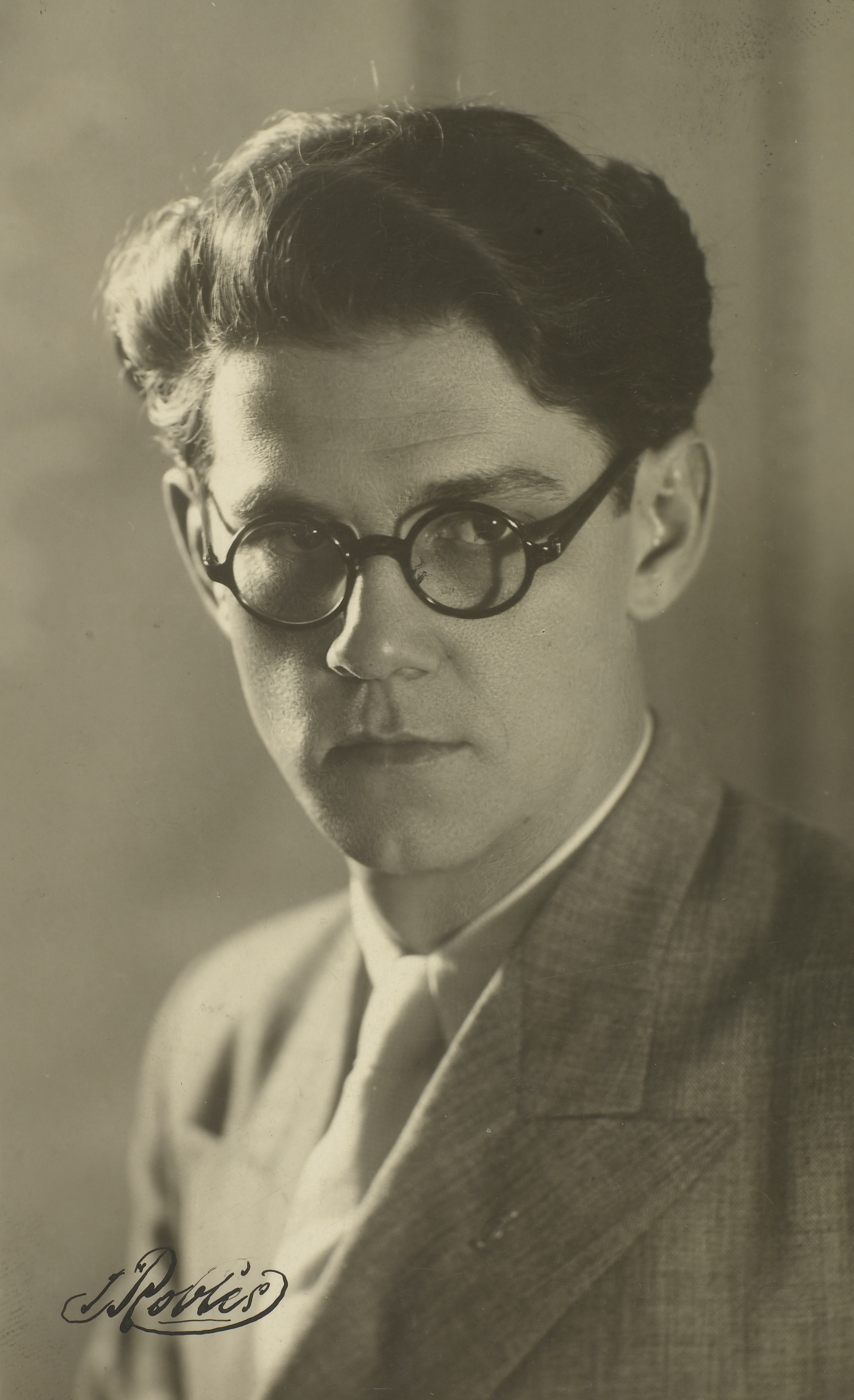
- Radamés Gnattali (1950)
- Born: January 27, 1906; Porto Alegre, Rio Grande do Sul, Brazil
- Died: February 3, 1988 (aged 82); Rio de Janeiro, Brazil
- Occupations: Composer, Conductor, Orchestrator, Arranger

Radamés Gnattali (27 January 1906 – 3 February 1988) was a Brazilian composer of both classical and popular music, as well as a conductor, orchestrator, and arranger.

== Biography ==
Radamés Gnattali was born in Porto Alegre (the capital of Rio Grande do Sul, the southernmost state of Brazil) on 27 January 1906. His parents were both musicians who had emigrated from Italy at the end of the 19th century. His mother, Adélia Fossati, was a pianist and music teacher. His father, Alessandro Gnattali, had been a carpenter in Italy, but after arriving in Brazil applied his passion for music to creating a new career for himself as a successful bassoonist and conductor (as a union leader with strong anarchist sympathies he also went on to organize a strike of the musicians' union in 1921). The couple had five children, three of whom, including Radamés, were named after characters from Verdi operas (the others being Aida and Ernani).

He began to play the piano with his mother at the age of 6, and went on to learn the violin with his cousin Olga Fossati. When he was 9 he received an award from the Italian consul for conducting a children's orchestra in arrangements of his own. In the following years, he also learned the guitar and cavaquinho and started playing these instruments in a successful group called Os Exagerados, as well as at silent films and dances. In 1920, at the age of 14, he entered the School of Fine Arts at the University of Rio Grande do Sul, where he studied with the musicologist and piano teacher Guilherme Fontainha (a student of Vianna da Motta), eventually winning a gold medal for piano playing in 1924. He then moved to Rio de Janeiro, where he gave a series of successful piano recitals, while also studying at the National Music Institute. His lifelong association with Ernesto Nazareth, the renowned composer of Brazilian national music dates from this period. Back in Porto Alegre due to lack of money, Gnattali founded the Quarteto Henrique Oswald, in which he played first as a pianist and then as a violinist.

A 1929 performance as soloist in Tchaikovsky's B-flat piano concerto, played with the orchestra of the Teatro Municipal in Rio de Janeiro, was praised in the press but did not lead to a long-term career as a concert pianist. Instead, Gnattali began a career in Rio as a successful conductor and arranger of popular music—activities which tended to divert his attention from other genres. Financial needs led him to work for radio stations and record companies as a pianist, conductor and arranger of popular music. His background music for radio serials and his clever arrangements of the tunes and dances of the day made him a successful figure.

In parallel, he pursued a career as a self-taught composer of classical music. While beginning to compose music influenced by Brazilian folk materials, he continued to dream of becoming a major concert artist. The chance of winning a post as piano professor at the National Music Institute in Rio de Janeiro, with the support of the newly installed President of Brazil, Getúlio Vargas (following the Revolution of 1930), who received the musician in person, disappointingly came to nothing (though Gnattali later commented that the encounter with Vargas changed his life).

When a national radio station, Rádio Nacional, was inaugurated in 1936, Gnattali immediately became involved. He remained an influential figure in the institution for 30 years, conducting and providing sophisticated arrangements of popular music. He gradually developed the radio's house band, building it up to become a full orchestra.

He died in Rio de Janeiro on 3 February 1988.

== Music ==
Gnattali's musical career straddled popular and classical genres and their traditions. His arrangements of samba pieces, involving strings, woodwind and brass (rather than the traditional accompaniments with two guitars, cavaquinho, accordion, tamborin and flute) exposed him to lifelong critical attacks from Brazilian musical traditionalists who resented the "jazzing up" of the genre. Conversely, some of his serious concert pieces (música de concerto) attracted the opposite criticism of inappropriately introducing instruments such as the mandolin, marimba, accordion, mouth organ and electric guitar into the concert hall. In doing this, he was inspired by his friends from the world of popular music, including Jacob do Bandolim, Edu da Gaita and Chiquinho do Acordeom ("Accordion Chiquinho"), for each of whom he composed dedicated concert pieces.

By the 1930s he was composing concert music in a Neo-Romantic style also incorporating jazz and traditional Brazilian strains. Over the decades, the emphasis Gnattali placed on these components shifted towards jazz in the early 1950s and back towards the Brazilian popular styles by the start of the 1960s. He composed several major guitar scores, including three solo concertos and three duo concertos. Brazilian composer Antônio Carlos Jobim included the song "Meu Amigo Radamés" as a tribute to Radamés in his final album, Antonio Brasileiro (1994).
