= Castro Barbosa =

Brazilian singer, actor, composer, and comedian

Joaquim Silvério de Castro Barbosa
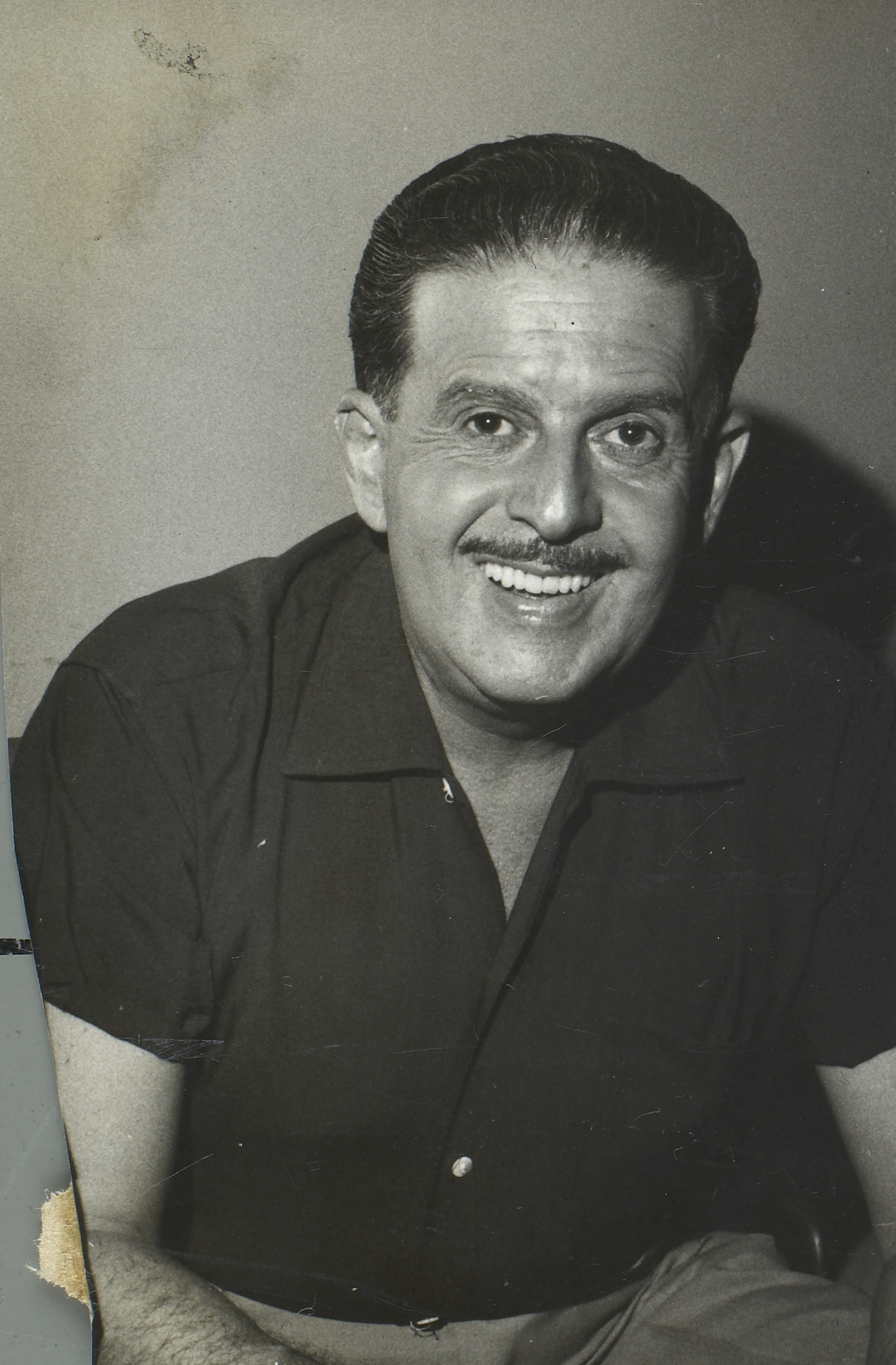
- Castro Barbosa, 1961
- Born: 1905
- Died: 1975 (aged 69–70)
- Occupations: Singer, actor

Castro Barbosa (1905-1975) was a Brazilian actor and singer. His song, O Teu Cabelo Nao Nega, Mulata!, became a hit in Brazil in 1932.
