= Associação Atlética Ranchariense =

Ranchariense
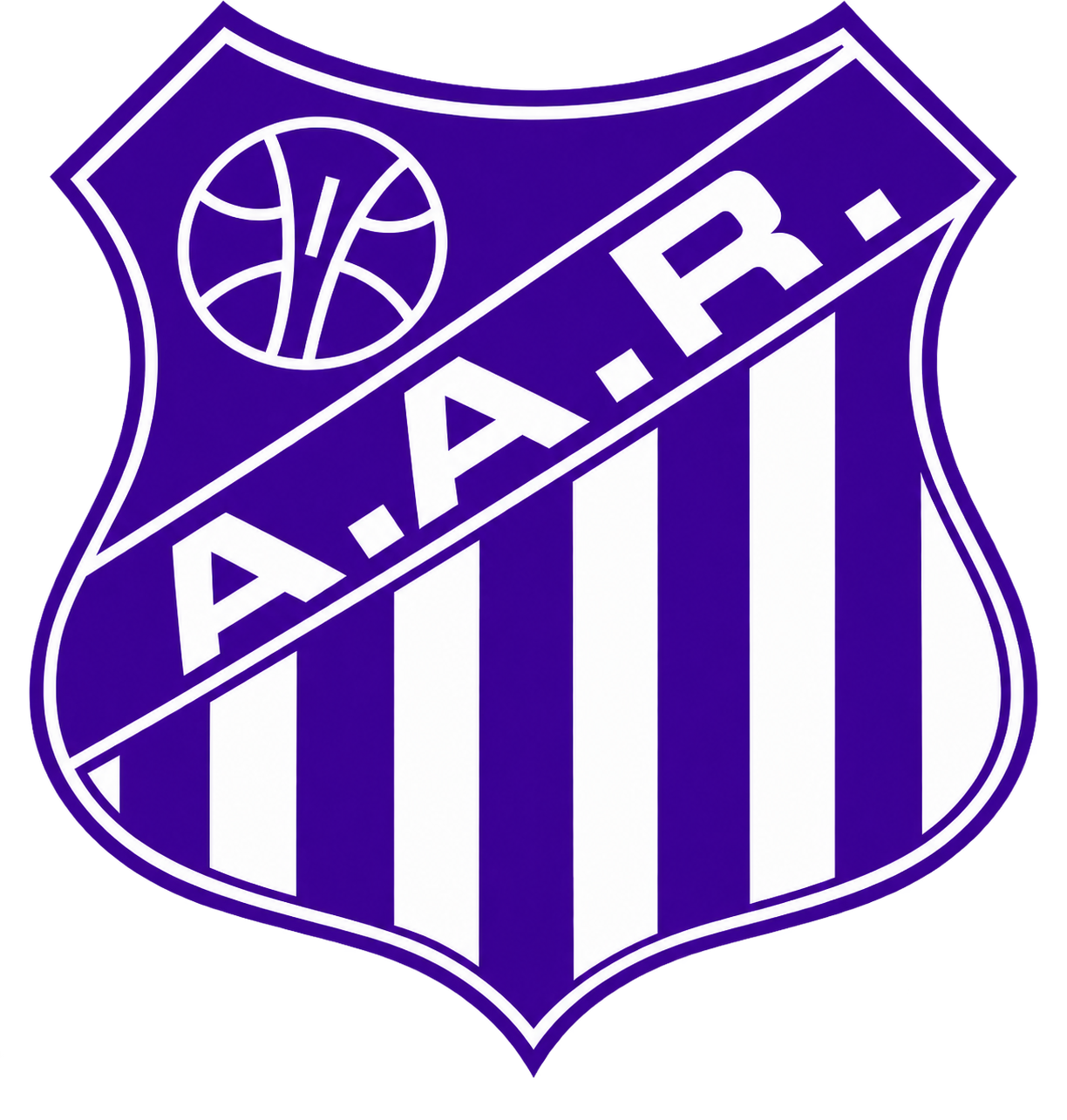
- Full name: Associação Atlética Ranchariense
- Founded: 20 January 1943; 83 years ago
- Ground: Estádio Francisco Franco
- Capacity: 4,600
- President: Emerson Augusto Passianoto
Home colors	Away colors

Associação Atlética Ranchariense, simply known as Ranchariense, is a Brazilian football club based in Rancharia, São Paulo.

== History ==
Founded on 20 January 1943, the club began its journey in professional football in the 1978 season. It only participated in the minor divisions of São Paulo, with its last appearance in 2008. In 2016 it joined the Taça Paulista de Futebol project, competition which aimed to move inactive clubs, being the first champion of the tournament. Currently, the club competes in the youth competitions of the Campeonato Paulista.

== Honours ==
- Taça Paulista de Futebol
  - Winners: 2016
