= O Ébrio (film) =

1946 film directed by Gilda de Abreu

- Directed by: Gilda de Abreu
- Screenplay by: Gilda de Abreu (screenplay); Vicente Celestino (story)
- Produced by: Gilda de Abreu; Adhemar Gonzaga
- Starring: Vicente Celestino; Alice Archambeau
- Cinematography: A.P. Castro
- Edited by: A.P. Castro
- Music by: Vicente Celestino
- Production company: Cinédia
- Release date: 28 August 1946 (Brazil)
- Running time: 107 minutes
- Country: Brazil
- Language: Portuguese

O Ébrio (English: The Drunkard) is a 1946 Brazilian film directed by Gilda de Abreu. The screenplay is based on a song by Vicente Celestino. In addition to being the first female director of a Brazilian sound film, the movie enjoyed both commercial and critical success, garnering about 4 million viewers between 1946 and 1950. It is still regarded as "one of the great successes of Brazilian Cinema", according to film historian João Luiz Vieira.

== Cast ==
- Vicente Celestino... Gilberto Silva
- Alice Archambeau... Marieta
- Rodolfo Arena... Primo José
- Victor Drummond... father Simão
- Manoel Vieira... Pedro's father
- Walter D'Ávila... Primo Rego
- Júlia Dias... Lola
- Arlete Lester... Maricota
- José Mafra... Primo Leão
- Isabel de Barros... Princesinha (as Izabelinha Barros)
- Antonia Marzullo... Lindoca
- Marilu Dantas...empregada de Gilberto
- Manoel Rocha... barman
- Jacy de Oliveira... Maria das Neves
- Amadeu Celestino - Vicente Celestino's brother
