= Vicente Celestino =

Brazilian singer, composer, and actor

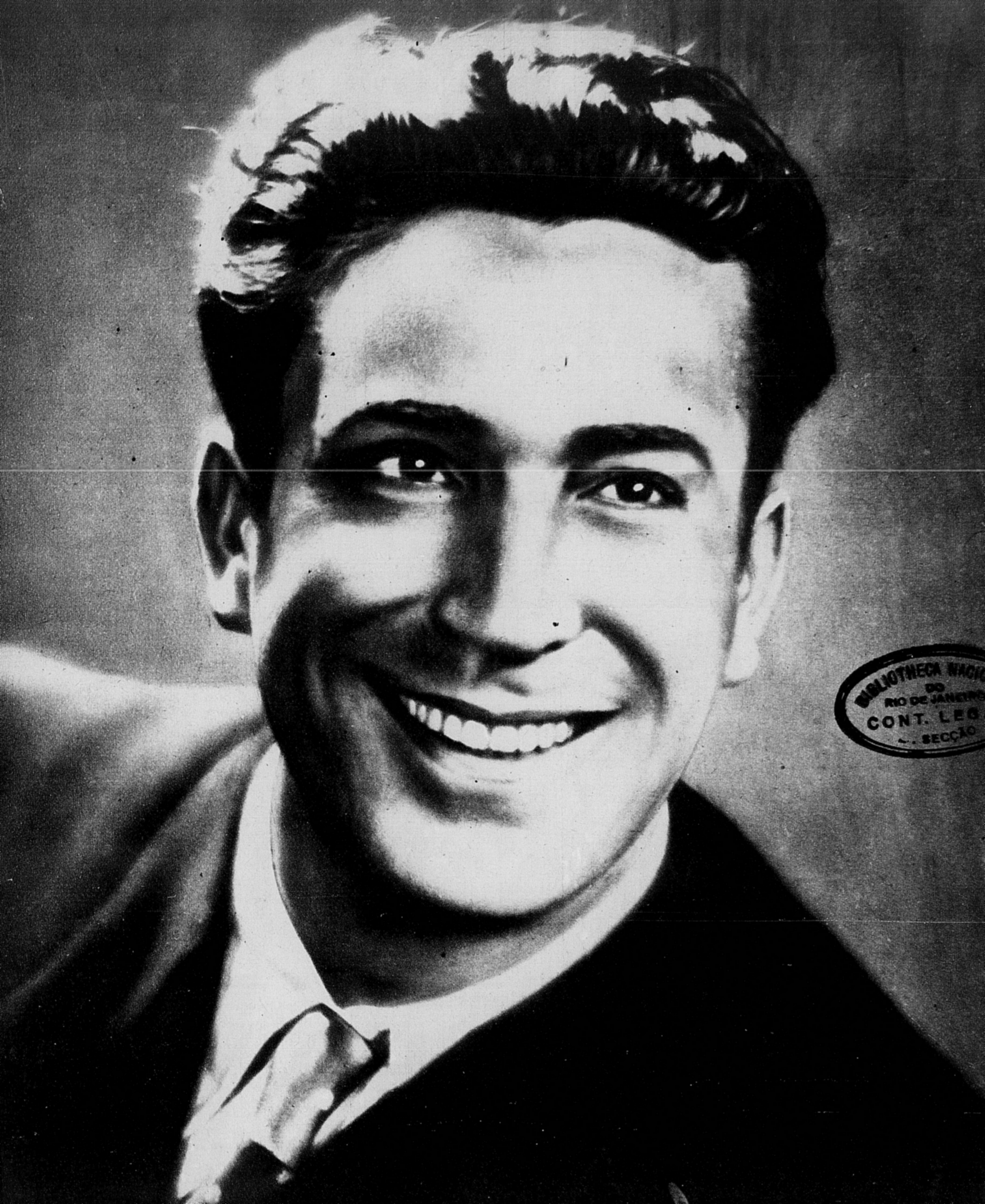

Background information
- Born: Antônio Vicente Filippe Celestino; September 12, 1894; Rio de Janeiro, Brazil
- Died: August 23, 1968 (aged 73) São Paulo
- Genres: vocal, guitar
- Occupations: singer, songwriter, actor
- Years active: 1915-1968
- Labels: Odeon, Columbia, RCA Victor

Antônio Vicente Filipe Celestino (12 September 1894 – 23 August 1968) was a Brazilian singer, composer and actor of Italian descent.

== Life and career ==
Celestino was born in Rio de Janeiro, in the district of Santa Teresa, on 12 September 1894, although his birthdate was registered as 22 September. Son of Giuseppe Celestino and Serafina Gammaro, Italian immigrants from Calabria, he had eleven siblings. Five of them also became singers and one became an actor (Amadeu Celestino). From a humble background, Celestino worked since he was eight as a shoemaker, fishmonger, and newsboy.

A fan of Enrico Caruso, Celestino started singing for acquaintances, at parties, beer halls, revues and serenades. He made his professional debut singing the waltz Flor do Mal at Teatro São José; his first album was released in 1915 by Odeon (Casa Edison). selling thousands of copies. A tenor, Celestino toured across Brazil and recorded 137 78 RPM discs, ten compacts and 31 LPs.

Celestino married movie director Gilda de Abreu, who has directed him in two films: O Ébrio (1946) and Coração Materno (1951), named after and featuring his songs.

Celestino died on 23 August, 1968, in São Paulo.
