= Berlin to the Samba Beat =

1944 film directed by Luiz de Barros

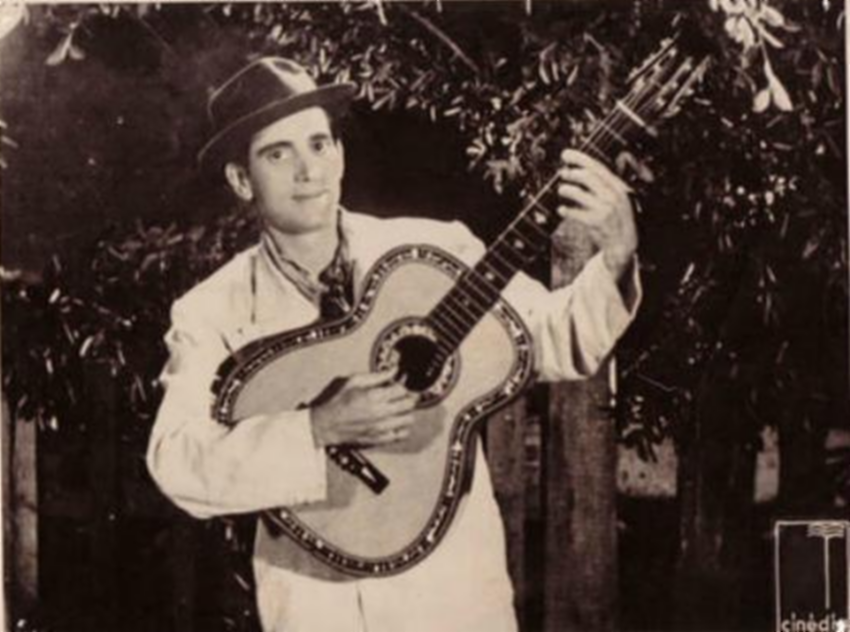
- Still with Francisco Alves
- Directed by: Luiz de Barros
- Written by: Herivelto Martins; Luiz de Barros; Adhemar Gonzaga
- Produced by: Adhemar Gonzaga
- Cinematography: Afrodísio de Castro
- Edited by: Wilson Costa
- Production company: Cinédia
- Distributed by: Cinédia
- Release date: 7 January 1944
- Running time: 115 minutes
- Country: Brazil
- Language: Portuguese

Berlin to the Samba Beat (Portuguese:Berlim na Batucada) is a 1944 Brazilian musical comedy film directed by Luiz de Barros. The film was in the popular tradition of chanchadas, featuring stars of the musical stage. It was made by the Rio de Janeiro-based Cinédia studio. It was a follow-up to the hit Samba in Berlin (1944) which made fun of Brazil's World War II enemy Nazi Germany.

== Cast ==
- Procópio Ferreira as Zé Carioca
- Francisco Alves as Chico
- Solange França as Odete
- Alfredo Viviani as Pacheco
- Lyson Caster as Mrs.Pacheco
- Delorges Caminha
- Chocolate
- Léo Albano
- Alvarenga
- Carlos Barbosa
- Linda Batista
- Jupira Brasil
- Luizinha Carvalho
- Olivinha Carvalho
- Nilo Chagas
- Matilde Costa
- Walter D'Ávila
- Edu da Gaita
- Ivo de Freitas
- Dalva de Oliveira
- Lila de Oliveira
- Margarida de Oliveira
- Pedro Dias
- Heitor dos Prazeres
- Claudionor dos Santos
- Otávio França
- Viviane Gaster
- Adhemar Gonzaga
- Henricão
- Jararaca
- Maurício Lanthos
- Príncipe Maluco
- Vicente Marchelli
- Herivelto Martins
- Flora Matos
- Silvino Neto
- Nilo Oliveira
- Grande Otelo
- Ranchinho
- Ratinho
- Pery Ribeiro
- Manoel Rocha
- Fada Santoro
- Nair Santos
- Grijo Sobrinho

== Bibliography ==
- Shaw, Lisa & Dennison, Stephanie. Brazilian National Cinema. Routledge, 2014.
