= Lourdinha Bittencourt =

Brazilian actress and singer

- Born: Maria de Lourdes Bittencourt; November 30, 1923; São Paulo
- Died: August 19, 1979 (aged 55); Rio de Janeiro

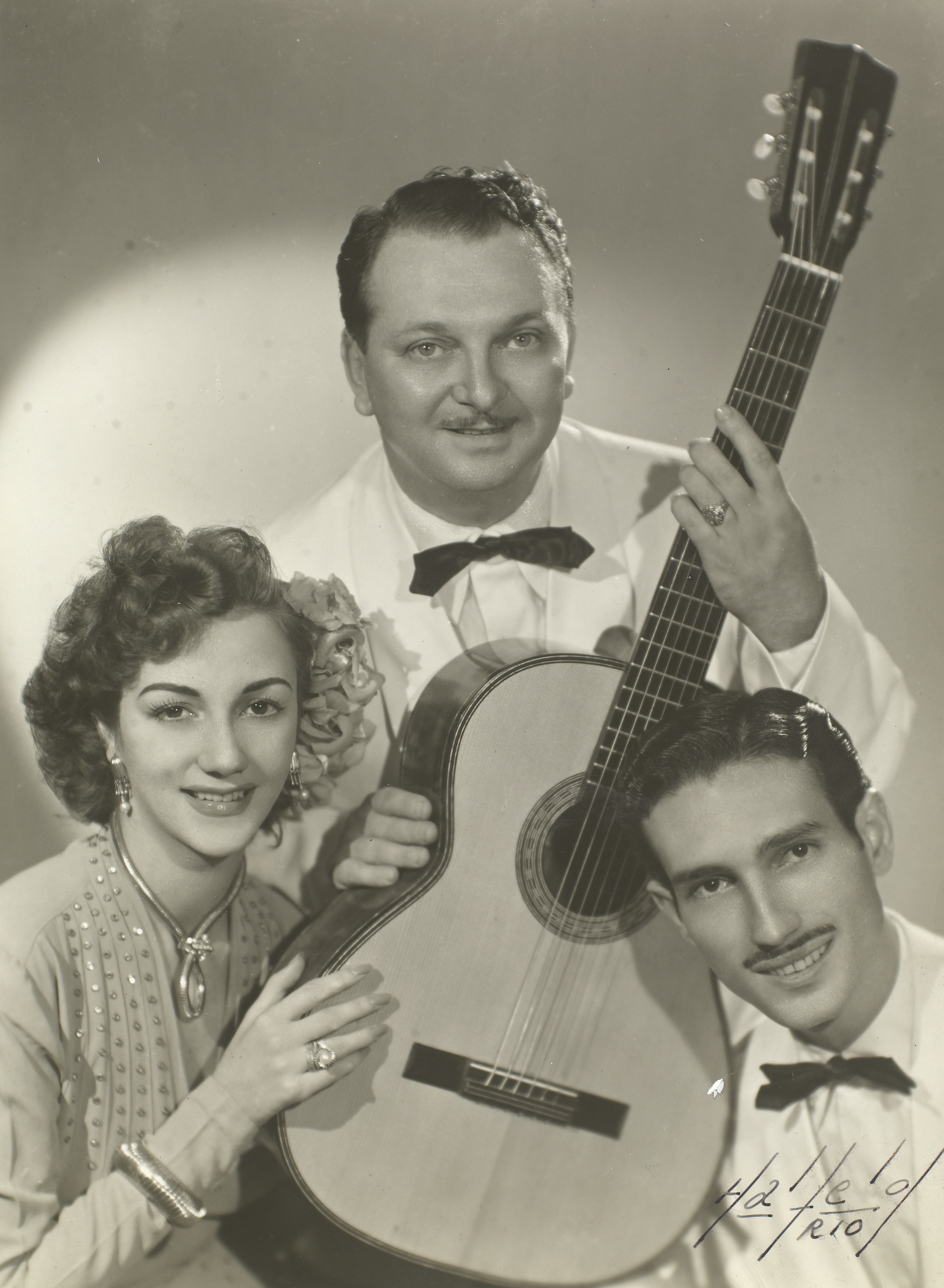

Lourdinha Bittencourt (née Maria de Lourdes Bittencourt; October 30, 1923 – August 19, 1979) was a Brazilian actress and singer who took part in the musical ensemble Trio de Ouro from 1952 to 1957, replacing the lead singer Dalva de Oliveira. She also appeared in telenovelas such as Rosa Rebelde (1969), Véu de Noiva (1969), Irmãos Coragem, (1970), Selva de Pedra (1972), Fogo sobre Terra (1974), and in films such as Poeira de Estrelas (1948), É Proibido Sonhar (1944) and Obrigado, Doutor (1948). She died in 1979 of a stroke.

== Life and career ==
=== As a movie star ===
Abandoned in the orphanage Asilo Melo Matos at birth, Lourdinha Bittencourt was adopted by piano teacher Maria Bittencourt. From childhood, she showed interest in music and dance. Stimulated by her mother, she began taking courses to develop her artistic skills, a process which soon led her to work at Cassino da Urca as child prodigy. In 1935, she appeared in the cast of the movie Noites Cariocas, and in several other films the following years. Lourdinha Bittencourt took part in many films, such as Maria Bonita and Cidade Mulher, both from 1936. She also appeared in É Proibido Sonhar (1943), Moleque Tião (1943), Asas do Brasil (1947), Obrigada Doutor, and Poeira de Estrelas (1948), O Homem Que Passa and Não Me Digas Adeus (1949).

=== As singer ===
In 1949, she recorded her first solo album for the label Star, with the songs Não Vale Recordar by Mário Rossi and José Conde, and Lenço Branco by Oscar Bellandi. Three years later she married Antonio Gonçalves Sobral, popularly known as Nelson Gonçalves, with whom she had two children. That same year she joined the third formation of the musical band Trio de Ouro, replacing singer Naomi Cavalcanti, alongside Herivelto Martins and Raul Sampaio. Among her first recordings as member of the band was a re-recording of Ave Maria no Morro, one of the great hits of the band at the beginning of the 1940s, sung by Dalva de Oliveira. The band was commissioned by Radio Nacional, remaining in the company until 1954. She then traveled throughout several Brazilian states, besides going to Argentina, Uruguay, Chile and Peru. Despite the success of the band at that time, she was the female figure who never equaled Dalva de Olivera, though they achieved some success with her vocals on India by J. A. Flores and M. Guerrero, Negro telefone by Herivelto Martins and David Nasser, Saudades de Mangueira by Nelson Trigueiro and Bartholomew Silva, and Luzes da Ribalta by Charles Chaplin.

In 1957, Lourdinha Bittencourt faced health problems that prompted her departure from the band. In 1959, her marriage broke apart and she then divorced Nelson Gonçalves. In 1960, she released an album with the song Ouvi Dizer by Adelino Moreira, and Como No Primeiro Dia (Comme Au Premier Jour) by Hubert Giraud and Pierre Dorsey through the label Polydor. The following year she released through RCA Victor a 78-RPM album with another song by Adelino Moreira entitled Ouvi Dizer and Eu Te Amo, also by Adelino Moreira with participation of Nelson Gonçalves.

=== As actress on television ===
From 1969, she worked as an actress of telenovelas, debuting in the role of Martha in Rosa Rebelde. In 1970, she appeared in the cast of the soap opera Irmãos Coragem, one of the greatest soap operas of Brazilian television produced by Rede Globo. Four years later she starred in Fogo Sobre Terra, her last appearance on television. That same year, she took part in the album Encontro com Adelino Moreira na Churrascaria Cinderela, where she sand the songs Ouvi dizer and Eu te amo.

== Filmography ==
=== Films ===
- 1935 – Cabocla Bonita
- 1936 – Noites Cariocas
- 1937 – Maria Bonita
- 1943 – Moleque Tião
- 1944 – É Proibido Sonhar .... Cantora
- 1947 – Asas do Brasil
- 1947 – Não me Digas Adeus
- 1948 – Obrigado, Doutor
- 1948 – Poeira de Estrelas
- 1949 – O Homem que Passa
- 1952 – Está com Tudo
- 1953 – Com a Mão na Massa
- 1956 – Guerra ao Samba
- 1956 – Samba na Vila

=== Television ===
- 1969 – Rosa Rebelde .... Marta
- 1969 – Véu de Noiva
- 1970 – Irmãos Coragem .... Manoela
- 1972 – Selva de Pedra
- 1974 – Fogo Sobre Terra .... Suely

== Discography ==
Year	Label	Title	Composer	Title	Composer
1949	78 RPM (Star)	Não Vale Recordar	Mário Rossi, José Conde	Lenço Branco	Oscar Bellandi
1952	78 RPM (RCA Victor)	Gaúcho Velho	Herivelto Martins, Pedro de Almeida	Última Festa	Herivelto Martins, Zeca Ivo
1952	78 RPM (RCA Victor)	Conversando Com A Chuva	Pedro de Almeida	O Bonde De Santa Teresa	Waldemar Ressureição
1952	78 RPM (RCA Victor)	Se A Saudade Falasse	Herivelto Martins	Ave Maria no Morro	Herivelto Martins
1952	78 RPM (RCA Victor)	Ouro Preto	Herivelto Martins, David Nasser	Alvorada De Luz	Paulo Marques, Pedro de Almeida
1952	78 RPM (RCA Victor)	Noite Enluarada	Herivelto Martins, Heitor dos Prazeres	Sereno	Herivelto Martins, Nelson Gonçalves
1952	78 RPM (RCA Victor)	Perdoar	Herivelto Martins, Raul Sampaio	Toureiro Valente	Herivelto Martins, Paulo Medeiros
1952	78 RPM (RCA Victor)	Tirolês	Herivelto Martins	Barraco De Tábua	Herivelto Martins, Victor Simon
1952	78 RPM (RCA Victor)	Mister Eco	Manezinho Araújo, Carvalhinho	Marcha Do Trouxa	Herivelto Martins, Adelino Moreira, Nelson Gonçalves
1953	78 RPM (RCA Victor)	Índia	José Asunción Flores, Manuel Ortiz Guerrero	Caboclo Abandonado	Herivelto Martin, Benedito Lacerda
1953	78 RPM (RCA Victor)	História Cabocla	Herivelto Martins, José Messias	Festa No Sul	Rubens Silva, Raul Sampaio
1953	78 RPM (RCA Victor)	Noites Do Paraguai	Herivelto Martins, Samuel Aguayo, P. J. Cartés	Negro Telefone	Herivelto Martins, David Nasser
1953	78 RPM (RCA Victor)	Luzes da Ribalta	Charles Chaplin	Maria Loura	Herivelto Martins, David Nasser
1954	78 RPM (RCA Victor)	Saudade De Mangueira	Herivelto Martins	Me Deixe Em Paz	Jovelino Marques
1954	78 RPM (RCA Victor)	Boca Fechada	Lupicínio Rodrigues	Vaya Con Dios	Joubert de Carvalho, L. Russel, I. James, B. Pepper
1954	78 RPM (RCA Victor)	Quem Dera	Herivelto Martins	Berço De Rei	Herivelto Martins
1954	78 RPM (RCA Victor)	Mironga De Moça Branca	Gastão Viana	Quem Tá De Ronda?	Príncipe Pretinho
1954	78 RPM (RCA Victor)	Balada do Ouro Negro	Paul Francis Webster, Dimitri Tiomkin	A Baiana Sambou	Herivelto Martins, Cyro Monteiro
1954	78 RPM (RCA Victor)	Noite Santa Silenciosa	Franz Gruber	Sino de Belém	Version - Evaldo Ruy
1955	78 RPM (RCA Victor)	Última Homenagem	Blecaute, Herivelto Martins	Louca	Herivelto Martins, José Messias
1955	78 RPM (RCA Victor)	Vencida	Herivelto Martins, Atílio Bruni	João João	Herivelto Martins, David Nasser
1955	78 RPM (RCA Victor)	Tudo É Samba	Herivelto Martins, Fernando Lobo	Maria Do Socorro	Blecaute, Herivelto Martins
1956	78 RPM (RCA Victor)	Ninguém Sofreu	Herivelto Martins, José Messias	Claudionor	Herivelto Martins. Nelson Gonçalves
1956	78 RPM (RCA Victor)	Ci-ciu-ciu (Canção do Rouxinol)	S. Seracini, E. Minoretti	Natal Branco	Irving Berlin
1956	78 RPM (RCA Victor)	Rancho da Serra	Herivelto Martins, Blecaute	Cidadão Bolero	Pedro de Almeida, Rubens Silva
1956	78 RPM (RCA Victor)	E Não Sou Baiano	Waldemar Ressurreição	Outra Vez	Herivelto Martins, David Nasser
1956	78 RPM (RCA Victor)	Buonanotte Al Bambini Del Mondo	Caribé da Rocha, A. Zarra, E. Monoretti	História Infantil	Herivelto Martins
1957	78 RPM (RCA Victor)	Jurei	Herivelto Martins, José Messias	Ai Favela	Brasinha, Paulo Medeiros
1957	78 RPM (RCA Victor)	Melhorou Hein	Herivelto Martins, José Messias	Vou-me Embora Pra Goiás	Herivelto Martins, Rubens Silva
1957	78 RPM (RCA Victor)	Nhá Marema	Herivelto Martins	Moamba De São Benedito	Luis Peixoto, Vicente Paiva
1957	78 RPM (RCA Victor)	O Samba Tem	Oldemar Magalhães, Rosalino Senos	Se Adormeço	Herivelto Martins, David Nasser
1960	78 RPM (Polydor)	Ouvi Dizer	Adelino Moreira	Como No Primeiro Dia	Giraud, Dorsey
1961	78 RPM (RCA Victor)	Ouvi Dizer	Adelino Moreira	Eu Te Amo	Adelino Moreira, Nelson Gonçalves
