= Gilda Abreu =

Brazilian actress, singer, writer and film director

Gilda de Abreu
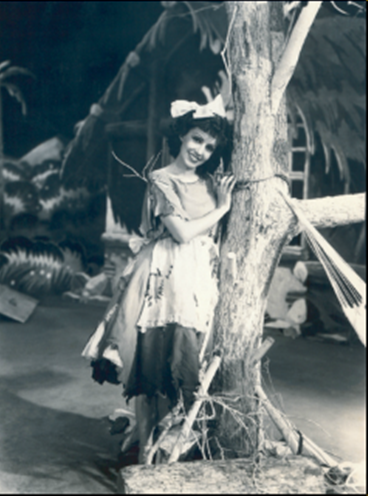
- Gilda de Abreu, from the film Silk Doll (1936).
- Born: 23 September 1904; Paris, France
- Died: 4 June 1979 (aged 74); Rio de Janeiro, Brazil
- Occupations: Actress, film director
- Years active: 1933–1979
- Spouse: Vicente Celestino

Gilda de Abreu (Brazilian Portuguese: [ʒiwˈdɐ dʒi aˈbɾɛw]; 23 September 1904 – 4 June 1979) was a Brazilian actress, singer, writer and film director.

== Biography ==
Born to a wealthy family, Gilda de Abreu began her career as a singer, performing in stage musicals and operettas. She first started appearing in theater productions in 1936, when she starred in the romantic comedy Bonequinha de Seda, produced by Adhemar Gonzaga. The film acted as a break-out role for Abreu, allowing for a transition from her previous stage-based career to one in the Brazilian film industry.

She was one of the first women to direct films in Brazil, coming to renown for her directorial debut, O Ébrio (The Drunkard) in 1946. The film, in addition to being the first sound film directed by a woman, was a commercial and critical success, with approximately 4 million viewings between 1946 and 1950. It is still regarded as "one of the great successes of Brazilian Cinema", according to film historian João Luiz Vieira.

After O Ébrio, Abreu directed Pinguinho de gente (Tiny Tot) in 1949, and Coração materno (Mother's Heart) in 1951. Neither achieved the same critical or commercial success as O Ébrio. These were her final films as director until 1977, when she directed the short film Canção de Amor (Love Song).

== Personal life ==
Abreu married Vicente Celestino, a fellow singer and actor, in 1933. He was cast as the lead in all three of her feature-length productions. Two of the films (O Ébrio and Coração materno) were based upon songs he had written. Celestino died in 1968, and then Abreu died on June 4, 1979, in Rio de Janeiro.
