= Engenheiro Paulo de Frontin, Rio de Janeiro =

Engenheiro Paulo de Frontin
- Municipality
- Município de Engenheiro Paulo de Frontin
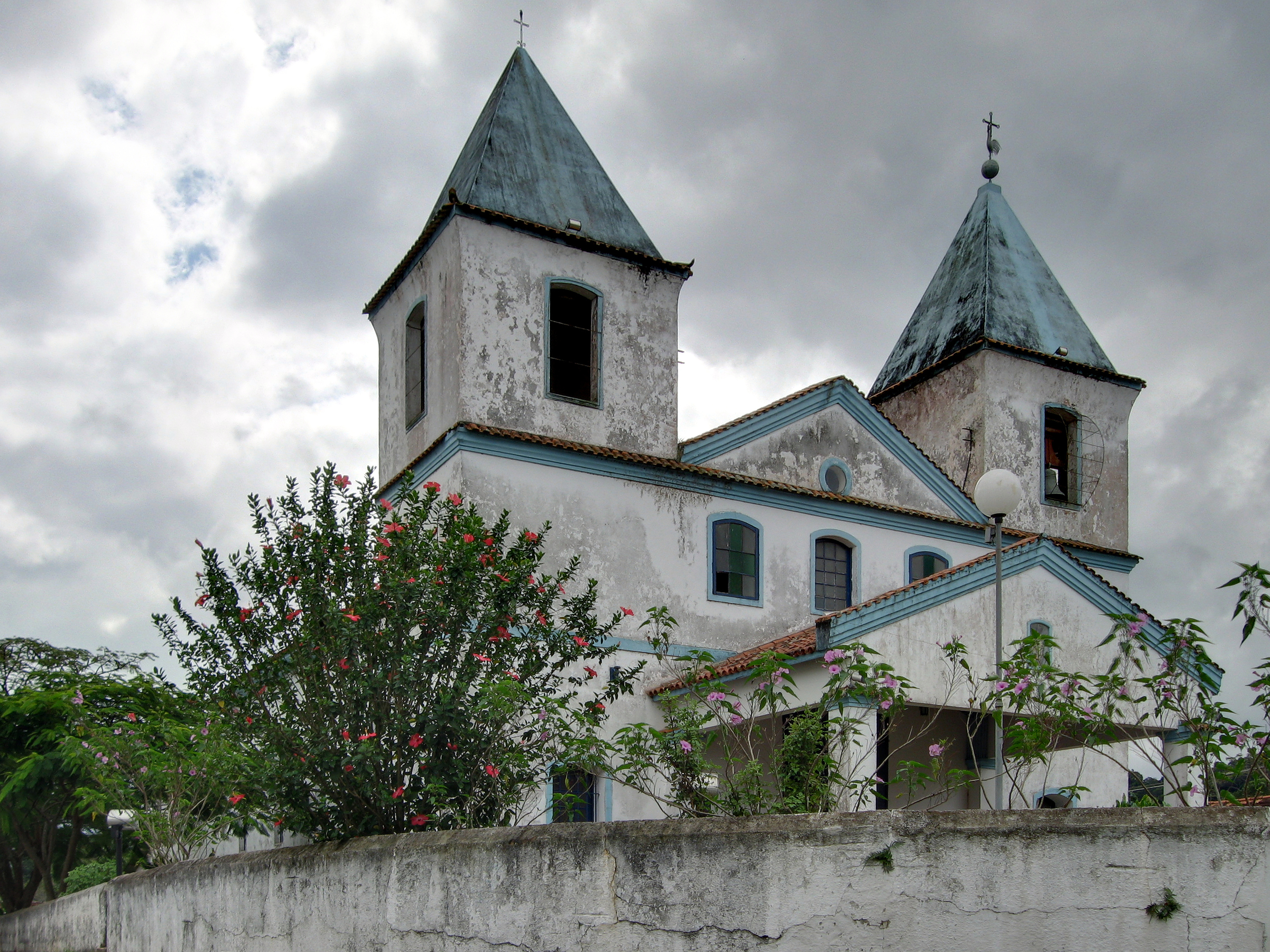
- Sacra Família Church

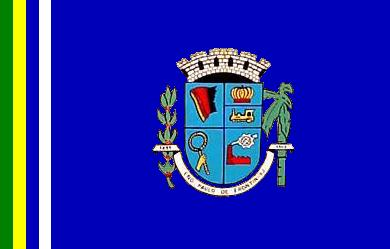
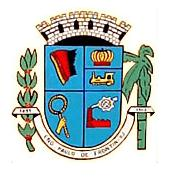
- Flag Coat of arms

- Location of Engenheiro Paulo de Frontin in the state of Rio de Janeiro

- Location of Engenheiro Paulo de Frontin in Brazil
- Coordinates: 22°33′00″S 43°40′40″W
- Country: Brazil
- Region: Southeast
- State: Rio de Janeiro

Government
  - Prefeito: José Emmanoel Rodrigues Artemenko (PSDB)

Area
  - Total: 139.381 km^{2} (53.815 sq mi)
- Elevation: 395 m (1,296 ft)

Population (2022)
  - Total: 12,242
- Time zone: UTC-3 (UTC-3)

Engenheiro Paulo de Frontin (Portuguese pronunciation: [ẽʒẽˈɲe(j)ɾu ˈpawlu dʒi fɾõˈtʃĩ]) is a municipality located in the Brazilian state of Rio de Janeiro. Its population was 12,242 (2022) and its area is 139 km^{2} (54 sq mi).

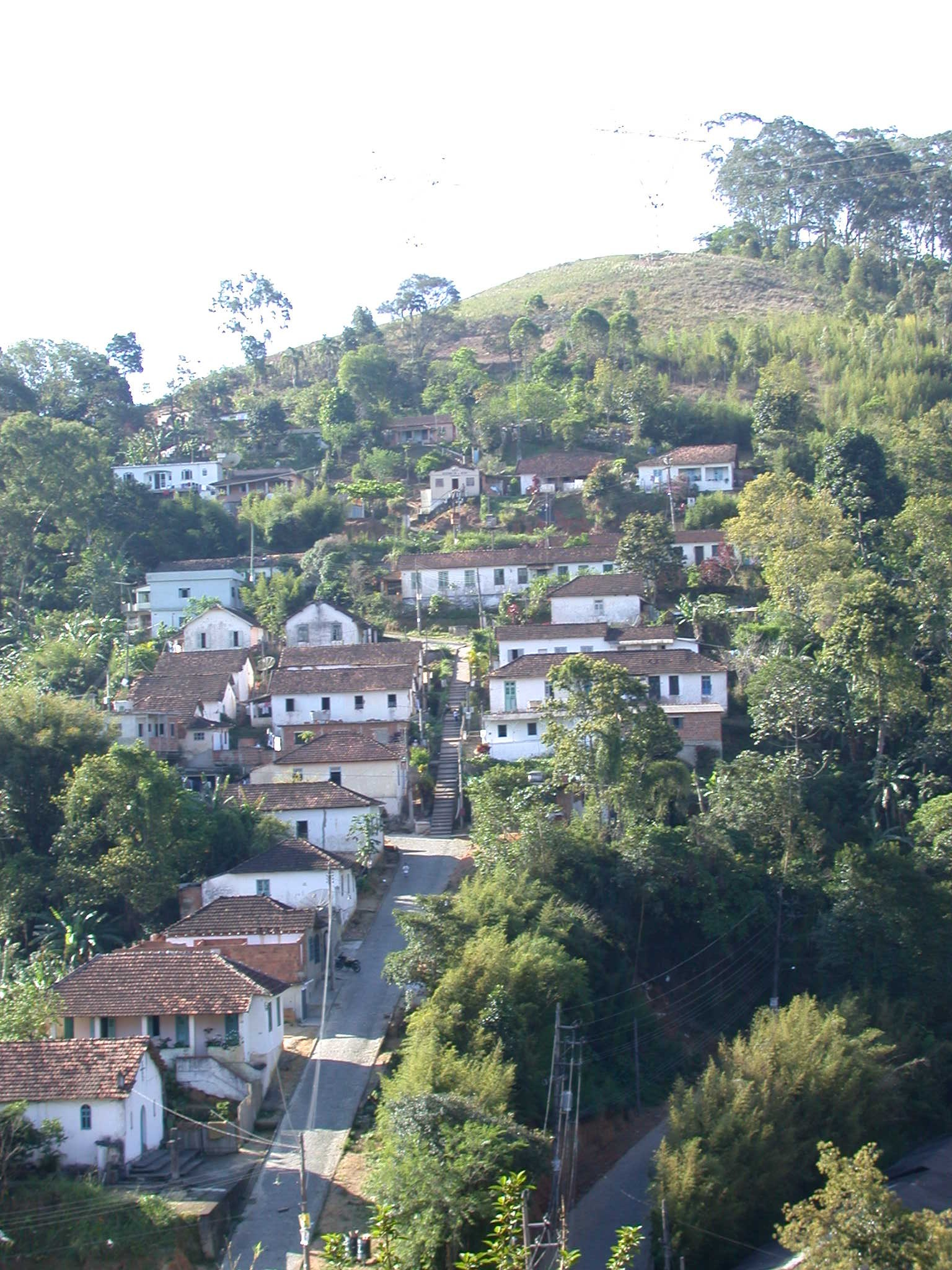
Street in the city
