= Secundino =

Secundino is a Spanish-language masculine given name, a form of Latin Secundus, meaning "second". Notable people with the given name include:

- Amor (footballer) (real name Secundino Salvador Nsi Eyanga; born 2000), Equatoguinean footballer
- Cundi (footballer) (real name Secundino Suárez Vázquez; born 1955), Spanish footballer
- Secundino Aifuch (born 1952), Paraguayan footballer
- Secun de la Rosa (born 1969), Spanish actor, author and director
- Secundino Delgado (1867–1912), Canarian politician
- Cundo Bermúdez (1914–2008), Cuban painter
- Secundino Borabota (born 1961), Equatoguinean sprinter
- Secundino Catarino Crispín (born 1959), Mexican politician
- Secundino Zuazo (1887–1971), Spanish architect and city planner

== See also ==
- Secundus (disambiguation)
