= No Trampolim da Vida =

1946 film directed by Franz Eichhorn

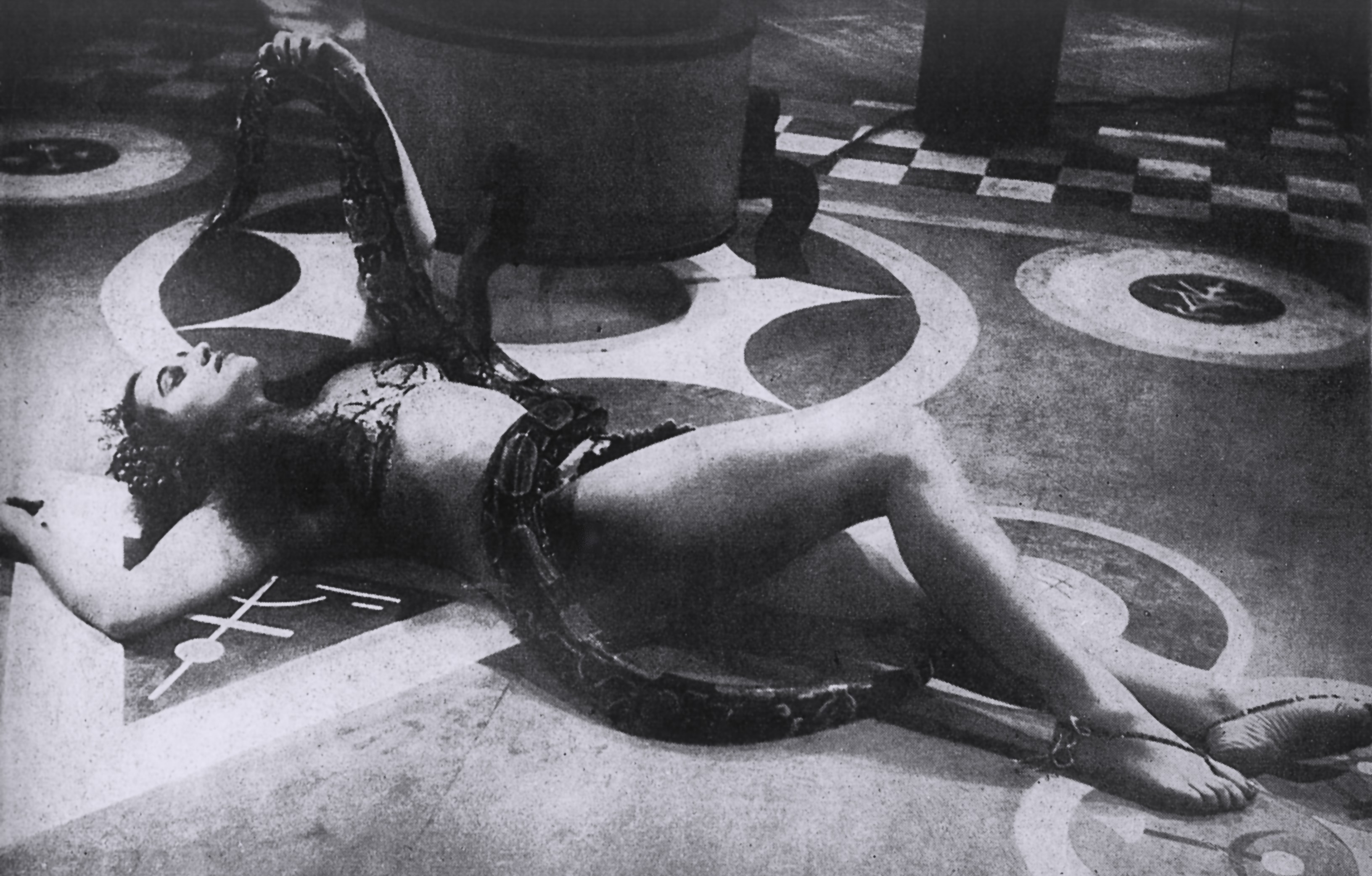
- Still with Luz del Fuego
- Directed by: Franz Eichhorn
- Screenplay by: Alexandre Alencastro
- Story by: Jararaca
- Produced by: Alexandre Wulfes
- Starring: Jararaca e Ratinho; Cléa Barros; Helmuth Schneider
- Cinematography: Edgar Eichhorn
- Production company: Filmes Artísticos Nacionais
- Release date: December 6, 1946
- Running time: 108 minutes
- Country: Brazil
- Language: Portuguese

No Trampolim da Vida is a 1946 Brazilian comedy drama film directed by Franz Eichhorn for Filmes Artísticos Nacionais. The film starred Jararaca e Ratinho, Cléa Barros, and Helmuth Schneider.

Ballerina Luz del Fuego also had a minor role in the film.

== Cast ==
- Jararaca e Ratinho
- Cléa Barros
- Helmuth Schneider (credited as Alexandre Carlos)
- Alexandre Alencastro
- Lamartine Babo
- America Cabral
- Apolo Correia
- Artur Costa
- Alberto Cruz
- Antonio Cursati
- Bandeira de Mello
- Luz del Fuego
- Pedro Dias
- Violeta Ferraz
- Armando Ferreira
- Adélia Iório
- Jararaca
- Ferreira Leite
- Madame Lou
- Prado Maia
- Vicente Marchelli
- Jaime Marini
- João Martins
- Estevão Mattos
- Pérola Negra
- Aristóteles Penna
- Mara Rúbia
- Zilka Salaberry
- Grijó Sobrinho
