= Carlos Alberto de Barros Franco =

Brazilian physician and professor

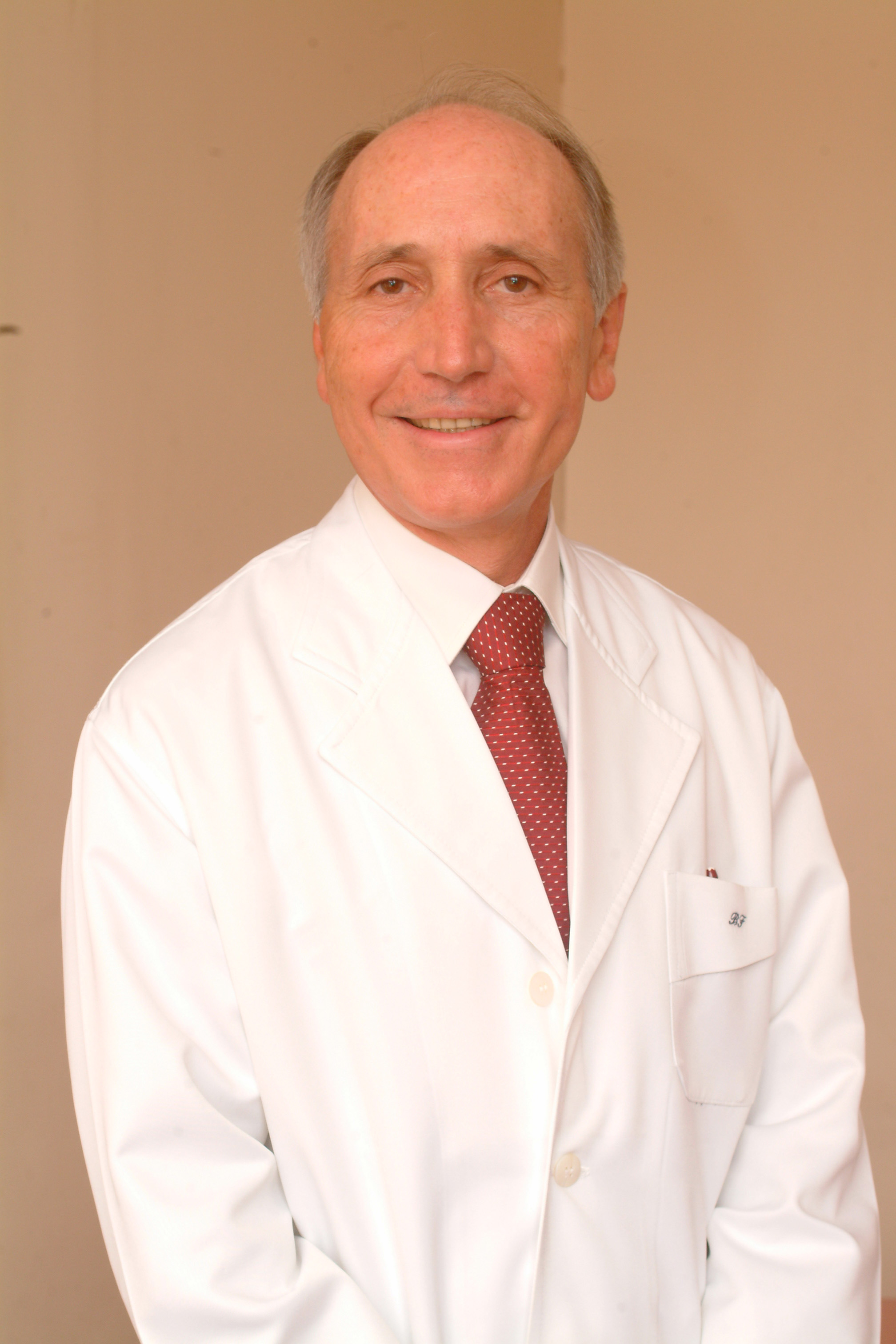
- Born: 19 May 1946 (age 79); Rio de Janeiro, Brazil
- Occupation: Physician

Carlos Alberto de Barros Franco (born 19 May 1946) is a Brazilian physician and professor, specializing in pneumology. He graduated in 1971.

== Early life ==
Barros Franco was born in Rio de Janeiro. His interest for medicine possibly arose from his contact with his uncle, Admiral Barros Barreto, a noted radiologist. In 1966 he defined his vocation when he was approved for graduation in medicine from Universidade Federal do Rio de Janeiro (UFRJ; at that time it was named Universidade do Brasil).

During his university graduation he was physiology monitor and was approved as an intern of the Intensive Care Unit of Hospital Federal do Andaraí, considered South America's best intensive care unit at that time, where he worked during 1970.

In the sixth year of the medical graduation he did his medical school internship in the 1a Clínica Médica of the School of Medicine of UFRJ under the guidance of Clementino Fraga Filho, one of the greatest professors and physicists of Brazilian medicine and whose name was given as a homage to the University's Hospital.

== Professional career ==
After graduating in 1971 Barros Franco completed a residency in pneumology at La Clínica Médica of UFRJ and in the Pneumology Service of IASERJ's State Hospital, one of the best centers of teaching for modern pneumology at the time.

In 1972 he was a scholarship researcher of the Conselho de Ensino para Graduados of UFRJ and in 1974 scholarship researcher of Brazilian's National Research Council (CNPq).

He was approved in 1972 by the Education Council for Medical Students due to his proficiency in English, a necessary requirement for the medical training in the United States of America.

Barros Franco was a visiting doctor in many hospitals abroad such as Mount Sinai Hospital (New York, USA); Toronto General Hospital (Toronto, Canada); Los Angeles County Hospital (Los Angeles, USA); MD Anderson (Houston, USA); and Centro de Laser del Hospital Español (Buenos Aires, Argentina); with emphasis in Clinical Pneumology, Lung cancer and Interventionist Bronchoscopy.

In 1975 he became an Auxiliary Professor of Medical Clinic of UFRJ's School of Medicine, being approved, in 1985, as an Assistant Professor for the same institution.

In 1987 he was named a Member of the International Association for the Study of Lung Cancer (ASSLC) and in 1988 became Member of the American Thoracic Society (ATS) and on 25 October 1993 was elected Fellow of the International Academy of Chest Physicians and Surgeons of the American College of Chest Physicians.

Since then most of his career has been divided between teaching at UFRJ's School of Medicine (Pneumology Service at UFRJ's Clementino Fraga Filho University Hospital) and his private clinic activity at Clinica Barros Franco – Respiratory Consulting.

Among his tasks in UFRJ's University Hospital the most noteworthy were Medical Residency in Pneumology Coordinator; Chief of Clinic of the Pneumology Service; Chief of the Pneumology Service and responsible for the class of Pneumology in UFRJ. He has also served as president of the Smoking Control Committee of UFRJ's University Hospital, General Coordinator of the Pulmonary Oncology Group of the same hospital, Director of the Nucleus of Study and Treatment of Smoking (NETT) and Health Director of UFRJ's Thorax Sicknesses Institute.

In 2000 he was elected as a Member of Brazilian's National Academy of Medicine (Academia Nacional de Medicina) occupying the chair 59 previously represented by professor Newton Bethlem.

In 2002 he was approved as a Professor of Pneumology at the Post-Graduation Medical School of Pontifícia Universidade Católica do Rio de Janeiro (PUC-RIO), obtaining the highest grade from all the examiners.

== Professional affiliations ==
In 2007, Barros Franco was nominated Chief of Pneumology, Respiratory Endoscopy and Sleep Disorder Service of Casa de Saúde São José, a private hospital in Rio de Janeiro with 300 beds. It is a complete and modern service that offers specialized evaluations, diagnostical and therapeutical respiratory endoscopy, pulmonary effort exams, surgical risk assessment, smoking treatment and Sleep disorder laboratory.

In PUC-RIO he coordinates the institution's Specialization Course in Pneumology that is accredited by both the Brazilian Pneumology Society (Sociedade Brasileira de Pneumologia) and Brazilian Medical Association (Associação Médica Brasileira). He also lectures on specialized courses in Pneumology, Respiratory Endoscopy, Pulmonary Oncology, Sleep Disorder and the I Course on Smoking, first in the country to qualify health professionals country-wide to handle this public health challenge.

Since 1981 he is the Medical Director of Clínica Barros Franco – Respiratory Consulting, one of the most prestigious pneumology private clinics in Rio de Janeiro. The clinic is specialized in resolving complex cases in respiratory diseases, respiratory endoscopy, pulmonary effort exams, smoking diagnosis and treatment, respiratory sleep disorders, treatment of cough and dyspnea of unknown origin and respiratory therapy and rehabilitation.

== Titles and positions ==
- Professor of Pneumology at the PUC-RIO's Post-Graduation Medical School
- Member of Brazilian's National Academy of Medicine
- Master in Pneumology and Tisiology from UFRJ
- Specialist in Pneumology and Tisiology from Brazilian's Pneumology and Tisiology Society
- Specialist in Respiratory Endoscopy from Brazilian's Pneumology and Tisiology Society and from Brazilian's Per-oral Endoscopy Society
- Chief of the Pneumology, Respiratory Endoscopy and Sleep Disorder Service of Casa de Saúde São José in Rio de Janeiro
- Medical Director of Clínica Barros Franco
- Member of the Technical Chamber in Pneumology and Thorax Surgery of the Medical Regional Council of Rio de Janeiro (CRM-RJ)

=== Previously held positions ===
Barros Franco has held leadership positions in several specialty associations, including: Scientific Director of the Brazilian Society of Pneumology and Tisiology (SBPT) (1991 to 1992), President of the Respiratory Endoscopy Department of the Brazilian Society of Pneumology and Tisiology (1992 to 1994), President of the III Congress of Pneumology and Tisiology of Rio de Janeiro's Pneumology and Tisiology Society (SOPTERJ) (1991), President of Rio de Janeiro's Pneumology and Tisiology Society (SOPTERJ) (1991 to 1993), President of I Brazilian Congress of Respiratory Endoscopy (1993), Director of the Respiratory Endoscopy of the Latin America Thorax Association (ALAT) (1996 to 2000), President of II South American Congress of Bronchoscopy (1997), President of the South American Bronchoscopy Association (1997 to 1999).

=== Areas of interest ===
Although he practices intensely the diagnosis and treatment of Respiratory illnesses in general, His main areas of interest are: Diagnostic and Therapeutical Respiratory Endoscopy, Diagnosis and Treatment of Lung Cancer, Respiratory Infections specially pneumonias in ICU, the study of problems and treatment of Smoking, treatment of Respiratory Sleep Disorders and lecturing Pneumology.

=== Scientific production ===
His scientific production translates his permanent interest with keeping him and his collaborators up to date and also divulging the knowledge accumulated in his many years of clinical experience and research with his team. Until December, 2007 his summarized scientific production was: 7 Studies presented in International Congresses, 102 Studies presented in National Congresses, 20 International Conferences, talks, Symposia and round tables, 418 National Conferences, talks, Symposiums and round tables, 60 Congress participations as speaker, 3 International Magazine publications, 84 National Magazine publications, 10 International Congress Annals publications, 68 National Congress Annals publications, 13 Chapters in books and paper-backs, 6 Thesis and 3 Monographs. His monographs presented to Brazilian Academy of Medicine denominated “Long term home-bound Mechanical ventilation in Brazil – A Challenge” and “Diagnosis of Mechanical Ventilation Associated Pneumonia with emphasis in Etiology” are references to student in these areas of knowledge.

=== Honors ===
Barros Franco has received several personal and institutional homages, including: Merit Certificate for relevant services offered to the Clementino Fraga Filho's University Hospital in 1998 and the Tiradentes Medal offered by the Legislative Assembly of the State of Rio de Janeiro in 1999, for relevant services offered to the State of Rio de Janeiro and the Análise Medicina Award 2008 for being chosen in a poll made by the Análise magazine as one of the most admired doctors in his specialty in Brazil.

=== Private life ===
In his private life he is an enthusiast of physical activities having practiced since young, capoeira, water polo, beach volley, tennis, submarine fishing and at an older age, snow skiing, that he tries to practice whenever possible with his family, wife and two sons. Appreciator of many artistic expressions including modern painting and sculpture, music and gastronomy.
