= Dalva de Oliveira =

Brazilian singer

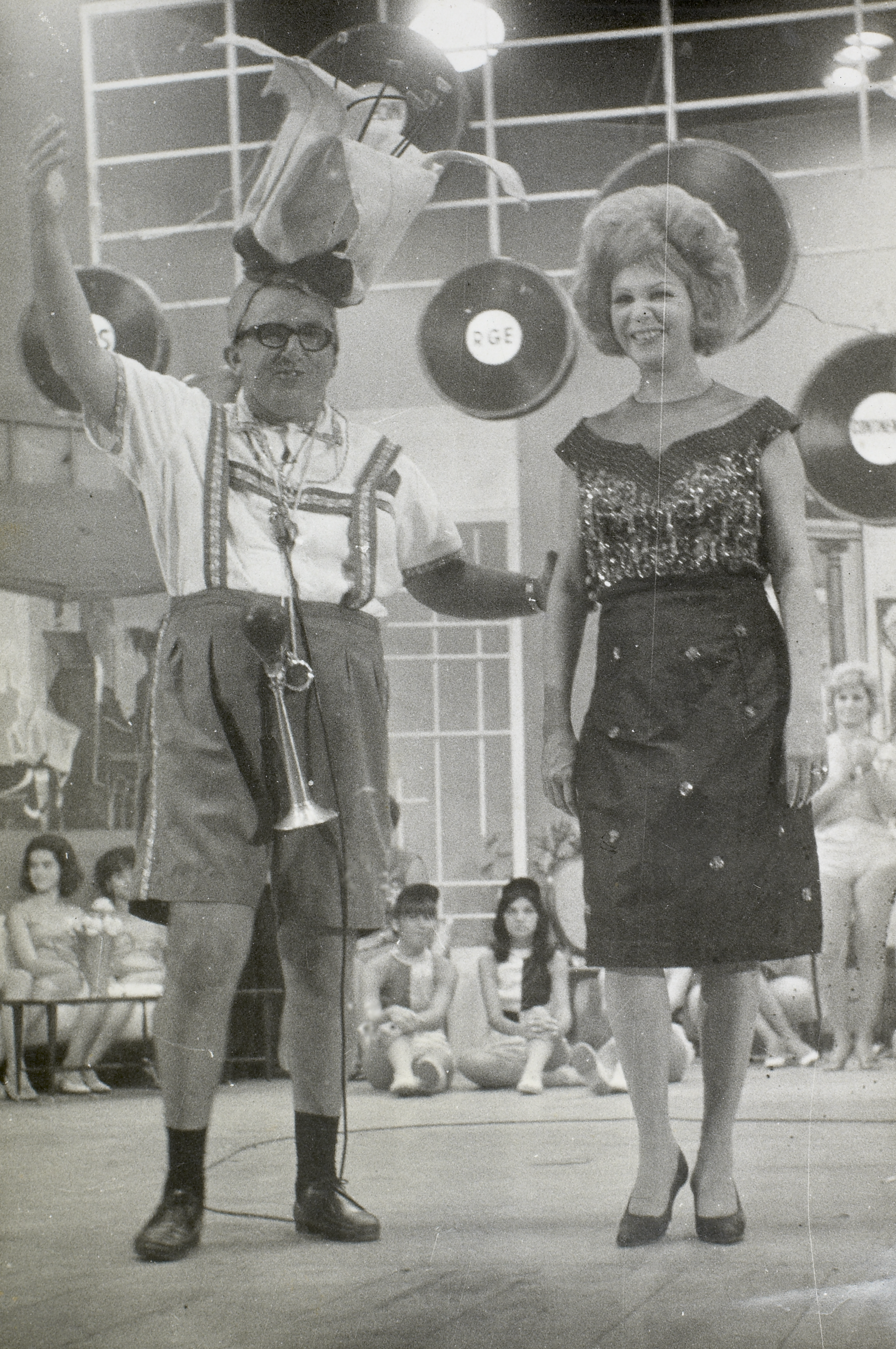
- Dalva de Oliveira (right) in the TV program Discoteca do Chacrinha, 1965

Background information
- Also known as: Vicentina de Paula Oliveira
- Born: May 5, 1917; Rio Claro, São Paulo, Brazil
- Died: August 31, 1972 (aged 55)
- Formerly of: Trio de Ouro
- Spouse: Herivelto Martins (m. 1936; sep. 1949)

Dalva de Oliveira or Vicentina de Paula Oliveira (May 5, 1917 – August 31, 1972) was a Brazilian singer and one of "divas" of the "Radio Era." Her greatest hits included "Segredo" (Secret) (1947), "Tudo acabado" (It's All Over) (1950), "Ave Maria" (1950), and "Teus olhos verdes" (Your Green Eyes) (1961). In addition, she recorded frequently with her son Pery Ribeiro, from her marriage with composer Herivelto Martins. She died from internal bleeding, probably caused by cancer.

== Life and career ==
De Oliveira was born in Rio Claro, São Paulo, Brazil. Her father was a carpenter and semi-professional musician, playing clarinet and saxophone with a group called Os Oito Batutas (the Eight Batons). He died when Dalva was just eight years old, and, as a result, Dalva and her three sisters were placed into an orphanage, where Dalva remained for three years. At the orphanage, Dalva learned to play piano and organ, as well as choral singing. De Oliveira left the orphanage due to an illness, and went to live with her mother in the city of São Paulo.

In 1933, while still a teenager, de Oliveira began working as a singer, touring (together with her mother) with a group led by Antônio Zovetti. Thereafter, de Oliveira spent a year as a regularly featured singer on Rádio Mineira in the state of Minas Gerais. Hoping to achieve success on a larger stage, de Oliveira and her mother moved to Rio de Janeiro. At first, de Oliveira had to work in a factory, while her mother worked as a cleaning woman. In 1936, however, she was hired by Rádio Mayrink Veiga, the most powerful broadcaster in Rio at that time.

De Oliveira began working with Herivelto Martins and Francisco Sena, whose singing duo Preto e Branco (Black and White) was already popular. In 1936, de Oliveira and Martins married. The three renamed the group Trio de Ouro (Golden Trio). The trio performed and recorded together until 1948. In 1949, de Oliveira separated from Martins. The couple's separation and divorce was prolonged, bitter, and public. Their dispute and mutual accusations were featured not only in press coverage, but in the lyrics of songs recorded by each of them. When she left Martins, one part of the public viewed de Oliveira as a fallen woman; another part, as a rebel and hero. De Oliveira was quoted as saying: "I had everything: a home, husband, children, career, and I left that security in order to gain my freedom, to regain myself as a woman." Author Maria Hupfer wrote of her: "Dalva became the idol of the prostitutes, mistresses, and homosexuals, and was excoriated by housewives and family men."

== Death ==
She died of internal bleeding because of cancer in her esophagus.

== Selected filmography ==
- Berlin to the Samba Beat (1944)
- Snow White and the Seven Dwarfs (Brazilian dubbing) Snow White Speaking (1938)
- Pinocchio (Brazilian dubbing) The Blue Fairy (1940)
- Fun and Fancy Free (Brazilian dubbing) Singing Harp (1947)
- The Heirs (1969)

== See also ==
- Dalva e Herivelto: uma Canção de Amor
