= 1948 in Brazilian football =

Football in Brazil
- Season: 1948

The following article presents a summary of the 1948 football (soccer) season in Brazil, which was the 47th season of competitive football in the country.

== Campeonato Paulista ==
Final Standings

Position	Team	Points	Played	Won	Drawn	Lost	For	Against	Difference
1	São Paulo	34	20	16	2	2	54	19	35
2	Santos	32	20	15	2	3	54	31	23
3	Ypiranga-SP	27	20	11	5	4	44	24	20
4	Corinthians	26	20	11	4	5	50	32	18
5	Portuguesa	20	20	9	2	9	49	34	15
6	Palmeiras	19	20	7	5	8	29	32	-3
7	Juventus	19	20	7	5	8	32	49	-17
8	Portuguesa Santista	17	20	6	5	9	29	41	-12
9	Comercial-SP	12	20	5	2	13	35	52	-17
10	Jabaquara	7	20	2	3	15	21	46	-25
11	Nacional-SP	7	20	2	3	15	18	55	-37

São Paulo declared as the Campeonato Paulista champions.

== State championship champions ==
State	Champion	State	Champion
Acre	América-AC	Paraíba	Botafogo-PB
Alagoas	Santa Cruz-AL	Paraná	Ferroviário-PR
Amapá	Macapá	Pernambuco	Sport Recife
Amazonas	Fast	Piauí	River
Bahia	Bahia	Rio de Janeiro	Cascatinha
Ceará	Ceará	Rio de Janeiro (DF)	Botafogo
Espírito Santo	Cachoeiro	Rio Grande do Norte	América-RN
Goiás	Goiânia	Rio Grande do Sul	Internacional
Maranhão	Moto Club	Rondônia	Ferroviário-RO
Mato Grosso	Mixto	Santa Catarina	América-SC
Minas Gerais	América-MG	São Paulo	São Paulo
Pará	Tuna Luso	Sergipe	Vasco-SE

== Brazilian clubs in international competitions ==
Team	South American Club Championship
Vasco	Champions

== Brazil national team ==
The following table lists all the games played by the Brazil national football team in official competitions and friendly matches during 1948.

Date	Opposition	Result	Score	Brazil scorers	Competition
April 4, 1948	Uruguay	D	1-1	Danilo Alvim	Copa Rio Branco
April 11, 1948	Uruguay	L	2-4	Canhotinho, Carlyle	Copa Rio Branco
