= 1882 in Brazil =

Events in the year 1882 in Brazil.

== Incumbents ==
- Monarch: Pedro II
- Prime Minister:
  - José Antônio Saraiva (until 21 January)
  - Martinho Álvares da Silva Campos (from 21 January to 3 July)
  - Marquis of Paranaguá (starting July 3)

== Births ==
- 18 April - Monteiro Lobato, writer
- 19 April - Getúlio Vargas, 14th and 17th President of Brazil
