= Nelma Costa =

Brazilian actress (1922–2023)

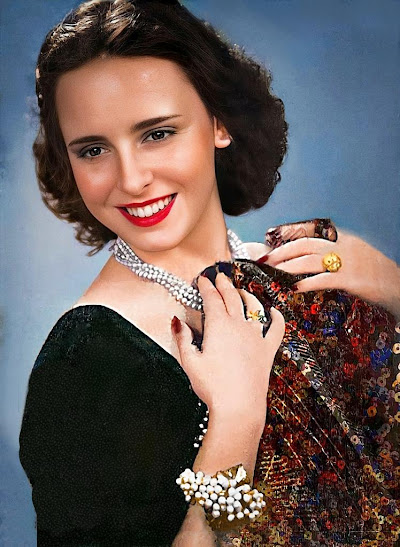
- Costa in 1940
- Born: Nelma de Costa; 1 February 1922; Rio de Janeiro, Brazil
- Died: 30 December 2023 (aged 101); Rio de Janeiro, Brazil
- Occupation: Actress
- Years active: 1925–1960
- Spouse: Janos Soares

Nelma da Costa (1 February 1922 – 30 December 2023) was a Brazilian actress. She was the last surviving actress from the silent era of Brazilian cinema and the last protagonist of Cinédia.

== Life and career ==
Nelma Costa was born on 1 February 1922, in the city of Rio de Janeiro. She was a descendant of a family linked to the arts, being the daughter of actors Álvaro Costa and Cora Costa. Her maternal grandparents, Caetano Magiolli and Livia Magiolli, were also actors.

Costa's career began in 1925, at the age of three, when she began to participate in soap commercials recorded for the cinema. In 1928, at the invitation of Olavo de Barros, she made her theater debut in the operetta Kenai. In 1937 she joined the theater company of Jaime Costa and also joined the theater company of Mesquitinha. Alongside Ítala Ferreira, Custódio Mesquita and Jaime Costa, she participated, in 1939, in the play Carlota Joaquina, the first theatrical representation of the Imperial Family of Brazil.

In 1939, at the invitation of Humberto Mauro, she participated in the short film Um Apólogo, alongside Déa Selva and narrated by Lúcia Miguel Pereira. She later became a Cinédia star, having acted in O Dia é Nosso (1941), Corações Sem Piloto, Caídos do Céu (1946) and Aguenta Firme, Isidoro (1951), being directed by Luiz de Barros in these last three films.

After getting married in 1947, she gradually moved away from the stage. For many years she was a radio actress, until she retired in the 1960s.

== Personal life and death ==
Costa was married to Janos Soares.

In February 2022, Costa turned 100, and she died in Rio de Janeiro on 30 December 2023, at the age of 101.

== Filmography ==
Year	Title	Role	Director
1939	Um Apólogo	Agulha	Humberto Mauro
1941	O Dia é Nosso	Enfermeira Laura	Milton Rodrigues
1944	Corações Sem Piloto	Mocinha	Luiz de Barros
1946	Caídos do Céu	Olinda	Luiz de Barros
1951	Aguenta Firme, Isidoro	Rita Molina	Luiz de Barros

== Theater credits ==
- 1928 – Kenai
- 1931 – Berenice
- 1937 – O Gosto da Vida
- 1937 – Assim... Não É Pecado
- 1938 – Malibu
- 1938 – O Homem Que Nasceu Duas Vezes
- 1938 – Tinoco
- 1939 – A Flor da Família
- 1941 – Ciumenta
- 1941 – Hotel da Felicidade
- 1941 – Tudo pela Moral
- 1941 – Casado sem Ter Mulher
- 1942 – A Família Lero-Lero
- 1942 – Emboscada Nazista
- 1942 – O Burguês Fidalgo
- 1942 – O Menino Jesus
- 1943 – A Família Lero-Lero
- 1943 – Emboscada Nazista
- 1945 – Grande Marido
- 1945 – Momo na Fila
- 1945 – O Costa do Castelo
- 1945 – O Meu Nome É Doutor
- 1946 – O 13º Mandamento
- 1946 – Onde Está Minha Família?
- 1946 – Venha a Nós...
- 1947 – A Canção de Nápoles
