= Teca Nelma =

Brazilian politician (born 1999)

- Nelma in 2024

Member of the Legislative Assembly of Alagoas
- Incumbent
- Assumed office 1 February 2027

Personal details
- Born: 1 February 1999 (age 27)
- Party: Workers' Party

Tereza Nelma Porto Viana Soares (born 1 February 1999), better known as Teca Nelma, is a Brazilian politician who was elected member of the Legislative Assembly of Alagoas in 2026. She has been a municipal councillor of Maceió since 2021.
