= Poeira de Estrelas =

1948 film directed by Moacyr Fenelon

Poeira de Estrelas is a 1948 Brazilian musical comedy film directed by Moacyr Fenelon. It stars Lourdinha Bittencourt and Emilinha Borba.
