= Folias Cariocas =

1948 film directed by Manoel Jorge, Hélio Thys

Folias Cariocas is a 1948 Brazilian musical comedy film directed by Manoel Jorge and Hélio Thys. It stars Lauro Borges, Dercy Gonçalves and Silva Filho.
