= Emilinha Borba =

Brazilian singer

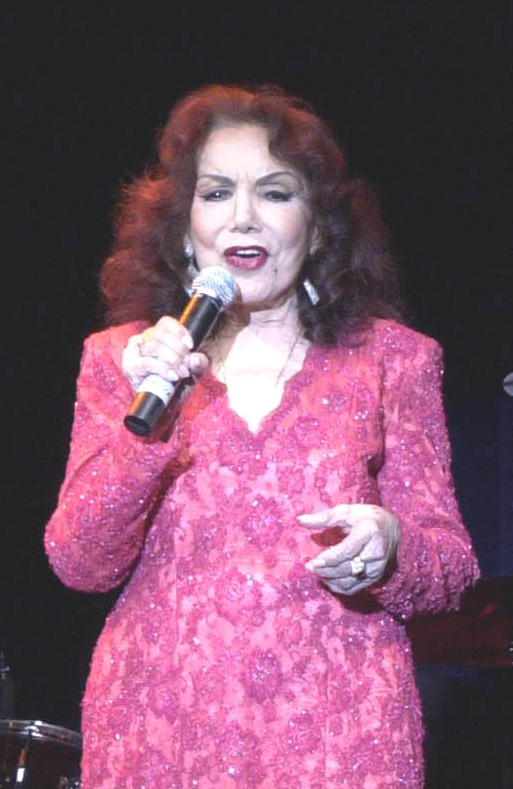
- Emilinha Borba in 2004
- Born: August 31, 1923; Rio de Janeiro
- Died: October 3, 2005 (aged 82); Rio de Janeiro
- Other names: Rainha do Rádio and Queen of the Radio
- Occupations: singer and actress
- Known for: rumbas and sambas

Emilinha Borba (August 31, 1923 in Rio de Janeiro – October 3, 2005) was a Brazilian singer and actress. She was named "Rainha do Rádio", "Queen of the Radio" in 1953. Borba endured for 30 years as a popular Brazilian radio singer and was noted for rumbas and sambas.

She visited London, UK in 1988 and was appointed the Madrinha (Godmother) of the London School of Samba. She also appeared with the LSS on its parade at the 1988 Notting Hill Carnival.

== Selected filmography ==
- Poeira de Estrelas (1948)
