= List of Brazilian films of 1936 =

A list of films produced in Brazil in 1936:

Title	Director	Cast	Genre	Notes
Alô Alô Carnaval	Adhemar Gonzaga	Carmen Miranda, Aurora Miranda, Barbosa Júnior, Pinto Filho	Musical comedy	
Bonequinha de Seda	Oduvaldo Vianna	Gilda de Abreu, Delorges Caminha, Conchita de Moraes	Comedy	
Caçando Feras	Libero Luxardo	Barbosa Júnior, Apolo Correia, Dalila de Almeida	Musical comedy	
Carioca Maravilhosa	Luiz de Barros	Carlos Vivan, Nina Marina, Pedro Dias	Musical comedy	
Cidade-Mulher	Humberto Mauro	José Amaro, María Amaro, Zenaide Andrea	Musical comedy	
João Ninguém	Mesquitinha	Mesquitinha, Grande Otelo, Dea Selva	Comedy	
Noites Cariocas	Enrique Cadícamo	Eduardo Arouca, Mendonça Balsemão, Montenegro Bentes	Musical comedy	
O Descobrimento do Brasil	Humberto Mauro	Alvaro Costa, João de Deus, Manoel Rocha	Adventure	
O Jovem Tataravô	Luiz de Barros	Albertina, Emílio Amoroso, Manuel F. Araujo	Comedy	

== See also ==
- 1936 in Brazil
