= List of Brazilian films of 1943 =

A list of films produced in Brazil in 1943:

Title	Director	Cast	Genre	Notes
Caminho do Céu	Milton Rodrigues	Rosina Pagã, Celso Guimarães, Luís Tito	Drama	
Moleque Tião	José Carlos Burle	Grande Otelo, Custódio Mesquita, Sara Nobre		
Samba em Berlim	Luiz de Barros	Mesquitinha, Laura Suarez, Dercy Gonçalves	Musical comedy	
Tristezas Não Pagam Dívidas	José Carlos Burle, Ruy Costa	Jaime Costa, Itala Ferreira, Oscarito	Musical comedy	

== See also ==
- 1943 in Brazil
