= List of Brazilian films of 1939 =

A list of films produced in Brazil in 1939:

Title	Director	Cast	Genre	Notes
Anastácio	João de Barro	Darcy Cazarré, Dea Selva, Olavo de Barros	Comedy	
Aves Sem Ninho	Raul Roulien	Dea Selva, Rosina Pagã, Rosita Rocha	Comedy	
Banana da Terra	Ruy Costa	Dircinha Batista, Oscarito, Aloysio De Oliveira, Carmen Miranda	Musical comedy	
Está Tudo Aí	Mesquitinha	Manuel Pêra, Violeta Ferraz	Comedy	
Futebol em Família	Ruy Costa	Jaime Costa, Dircinha Batista, Grande Otelo	Comedy	
Joujoux e Balangandãs	Amadeu Castelaneto	Lamartine Babo, Ary Barroso, Cândido Botelho	Musical	
Onde Estás Felicidade?	Mesquitinha	Alma Flora, Rodolfo Mayer, Nilza Magrassi	Romantic drama	

== See also ==
- 1939 in Brazil
