= List of Brazilian films of 1940 =

A list of films produced in Brazil in 1940:

Title	Director	Cast	Genre	Notes
Argila	Humberto Mauro	Carmen Santos, Celso Guimarães, Lídia Mattos	Romantic drama	
Céu azul	Ruy Costa	Jaime Costa, Heloísa Helena, Oscarito	Musical comedy	
Cisne branco	Luiz de Barros	Arnaldo Amaral, María Amaro, Sanny Castro	Comedy	
Direito de Pecar	Leo Marten	César Ladeira, Nilza Magrassi, Sara Nobre	Comedy	
E o Circo Chegou	Luiz de Barros	Arnaldo Amaral, Celeste Aída, João Baldi	Comedy	
Eterna Esperança	Leo Marten	Carlos Barbosa, María Belmar, Milton Braga Júnior	Drama	
Laranja-da-China	Ruy Costa	Barbosa Júnior, Nair Alves, Dircinha Batista	Musical comedy	
O Simpático Jeremias	Moacyr Fenelon	Barbosa Júnior, Zezé Porto, Antonieta Matos	Comedy	
Pega Ladrão	Ruy Costa	Mesquitinha, Lídia Mattos, Heloísa Helena	Comedy	
Pureza	Chianca de Garcia	Procópio Ferreira, Sara Nobre, Conchita de Moraes	Drama	

== See also ==
- 1940 in Brazil
