= 1993 in Brazil =

Events in the year 1993 in Brazil.

== Incumbents ==
=== Federal government ===
- President: Itamar Franco
- Vice President: vacant

=== Governors ===
- Acre: Vacant
- Alagoas: Geraldo Bulhões
- Amapa: Annibal Barcellos
- Amazonas: Gilberto Mestrinho
- Bahia: Antônio Carlos Magalhães
- Ceará: Ciro Gomes
- Espírito Santo: Albuíno Cunha de Azeredo
- Goiás: Iris Rezende
- Maranhão: Edison Lobão
- Mato Grosso: Jaime Campos
- Mato Grosso do Sul: Pedro Pedrossian
- Minas Gerais: Hélio Garcia
- Pará: Jader Barbalho
- Paraíba: Ronaldo Cunha Lima
- Paraná: Roberto Requião de Mello e Silva
- Pernambuco: Joaquim Francisco Cavalcanti
- Piauí: Freitas Neto
- Rio de Janeiro: Leonel Brizola
- Rio Grande do Norte: José Agripino Maia
- Rio Grande do Sul: Alceu de Deus Collares
- Rondônia: Oswaldo Piana Filho
- Roraima: Ottomar de Sousa Pinto
- Santa Catarina: Vilson Kleinübing
- São Paulo: Luís Antônio Fleury Filho
- Sergipe: João Alves Filho
- Tocantins: Moisés Nogueira Avelino

=== Vice governors ===
- Acre: Vacant
- Alagoas: Francisco Roberto Holanda de Melo
- Amapá: Ronaldo Pinheiro Borges
- Amazonas: Francisco Garcia Rodrigues
- Bahia: Paulo Souto
- Ceará: Lúcio Gonçalo de Alcântara
- Espírito Santo: Adelson Antônio Salvador
- Goiás: Luís Alberto Maguito Vilela
- Maranhão: José de Ribamar Fiquene
- Mato Grosso: Osvaldo Roberto Sobrinho
- Mato Grosso do Sul: Ary Rigo
- Minas Gerais: Arlindo Porto Neto
- Pará: Carlos José Oliveira Santos
- Paraíba: Cícero Lucena Filho
- Paraná: Mário Pereira
- Pernambuco: Carlos Roberto Guerra Fontes
- Piauí: Guilherme Cavalcante de Melo
- Rio de Janeiro: Nilo Batista
- Rio Grande do Norte: Vivaldo Costa
- Rio Grande do Sul: João Gilberto Lucas Coelho
- Rondônia: Assis Canuto
- Roraima: Antônio Airton Oliveira Dias
- Santa Catarina: Antônio Carlos Konder Reis
- São Paulo: Aloysio Nunes
- Sergipe: José Carlos Mesquita Teixeira
- Tocantins: Paulo Sidnei Antunes

== Events ==
=== February ===
- February 4: President Itamar Franco signs a law that regulates the plebiscite on the form and system of government in Brazil.

=== March ===
- March 14: Near Vila São Paulino, in Ipê, two freight trains operated by the Rede Ferroviária Federal S.A. (RFFSA) collided head-on inside Tunnel 10 (km 220 of the railway) after a communication failure placed both trains on the same track. One of the trains was carrying alcohol, resulting in a massive explosion and fire that lasted for more than three days. Three locomotive engineers were killed and one person was injured.

=== April ===
- April 21: Eight years after democracy is restored in the country, Brazil holds a constitutional referendum about what form of government and regime the country would go on with. Voters could choose between a republican or monarchic government, and between a presidential or parliamentary regime. The result was 86.6% of votes in favour of a republic and 69.2% in favour of presidentialism, leaving the country's form of government, a presidential republic, unchanged.

=== May ===
- May 21: Judge Denise Frossard sentences Castor de Andrade and 13 other big mobsters; including Capitão Guimarães, Luizinho Drummond, Antonio Petrus Kalil (a.k.a. Turcão), and Anísio Abraão David to six years in prison for criminal association. 53 deaths were attributed to the group.

=== July ===
- July 23: The Candelária massacre occurs after eight homeless people, including six minors are killed by several men, who were members of the police.

=== August ===
- August 1: The cruzeiro real becomes the national currency of Brazil, replacing the cruzeiro at a rate of 1000 to 1.
- August 29: Military police in Rio de Janeiro murder twenty-one residents of the Vigário Geral favela.

=== October ===
- October 13-19: American singer Michael Jackson is in São Paulo for his Dangerous World Tour; with two shows at the Morumbi Stadium, on the 15th and 17th of the month.

=== December ===
- December 7: Minister of Finance Fernando Henrique Cardoso announces an economic stabilization program.
- December 17: Brazil's Supreme Federal Court rules that former President Fernando Collor de Mello could not hold elected office again until 2000, due to political corruption.

== Births ==
=== January ===
- January 4 – Manu Gavassi, singer, songwriter, actress, directress and writer
- January 16 – Aldir Júnior, politician

=== February ===
- February 3 – Jessicão, politician
- February 12 – Rafinha, footballer

=== March ===
- March 5 – Fred, footballer
- March 24 – Gustavo Henrique, footballer
- March 30 – Anitta, singer and dancer

=== April ===
- April 13 – Letícia Bufoni, street skateboarder
- April 15 – Felipe Anderson, footballer
- April 30 – Henry Zaga, actor

=== June ===
- June 27:
  - Adair Cardoso, singer and composer
  - Camila Queiroz, actress

=== August ===
- August 17:
  - Rodrigo Caio, footballer
  - Ederson, footballer

=== October ===
- October 23 – Fabinho, footballer

=== November ===
- November 14 – Tabata Amaral, political scientist, education activist and politician

=== December ===
- December 10 – Zé Laviola, politician
- December 16 – Thiago Braz da Silva, Olympic athlete
- December 22 – Gabriel Medina, professional surfer

== Deaths ==
=== January ===
- January 13 – Camargo Guarnieri, composer (b. 1907)

=== April ===
- April 2 – Thales Monteiro, basketball player and Olympian (b. 1925)
- April 3 – Leopoldo Nachbin, mathematician (b. 1922)
- April 9 – Lindalva Justo de Oliveira, Roman Catholic nun (b. 1953)
- April 25 – Geraldo Del Rey, actor (b. 1930)
- April 30 – Diva Diniz Corrêa, marine zoologist (b. 1918)

=== September ===
- September 7 – Bruno Giorgi, sculptor (b. 1905)

=== December ===
- December 14 – Aristides Leão, neurophysiologist and researcher (b. 1914)

== See also ==
- 1993 in Brazilian football
- 1993 in Brazilian television
