= 1943 in Brazil =

Events in the year 1943 in Brazil.

== Incumbents ==
=== Federal government ===
- President: Getúlio Vargas

=== Governors ===
- Alagoas: Ismar de Góis Monteiro
- Amazonas: Álvaro Botelho Maia
- Bahia: Renato Onofre Pinto Aleixo
- Ceará: Francisco de Meneses Pimentel
- Espírito Santo: João Punaro Bley (till 21 January); Jones dos Santos Neves (from 21 January)
- Goiás: Pedro Ludovico Teixeira
- Maranhão:
- Mato Grosso: Júlio Strübing Müller
- Minas Gerais: Benedito Valadares Ribeiro
- Pará:
  - till 25 January: José Carneiro da Gama Malcher
  - 25 January-20 February: Miguel de Almeida Filho
  - from 25 February: Magalhães Barata
- Paraíba: Rui Carneiro
- Paraná: Manuel Ribas
- Pernambuco: Agamenon Magalhães
- Piauí: Leônidas Melo
- Rio Grande do Norte: Rafael Fernandes Gurjão/Antonio Fernandes Dantas
- Rio Grande do Sul: Osvaldo Cordeiro de Farias/Ernesto Dornelles
- Santa Catarina: Nereu Ramos
- São Paulo: Fernando de Sousa Costa
- Sergipe: Augusto Maynard Gomes

=== Vice governors ===
- Rio Grande do Norte: no vice governor
- São Paulo: no vice governor

== Events ==
=== June ===
- 11 June: The Order of Military Merit is established by President Getúlio Vargas.

=== July ===
- 23 July: On the recommendation of the National Petroleum Council, Brazil bans the use of private motorcycles throughout the nation in order to conserve fuel. Use of gasoline-powered automobiles had been prohibited the year before.
- 31 July - The Brazilian passenger ship and freighter Bage, largest commercial ship in Brazil's fleet, is torpedoed and sunk off the coast of the Sergipe state. The Bage, carrying 129 passengers and 102 crew, was en route from Belém to Rio de Janeiro when it was struck by a German U-boat. Seventy-eight people (41 passengers and 37 crew) are lost.
- 13 September - The Iguaçu Territory becomes a Brazilian territory.
- December - The prototype of the CNNA HL-8 makes its maiden flight.

== Arts and culture ==
=== Books ===
- Maria José Dupré - Éramos Seis
- G. E. Kidder Smith - Brazil Builds

=== Films ===
- Brazil at War (short propaganda film produced by the Office of War Information and the Office of the Coordinator of Inter-American Affairs
- Samba in Berlin, directed by Luiz de Barros and starring Mesquitinha

== Births ==
=== February ===
- 8 February: José Antônio Rezende de Almeida Prado, composer (died 2010).
- 19 February: Pedro Malan, economist and politician

=== June ===
- 21 June: Eumir Deodato, pianist, composer, producer and arranger

=== August ===
- 14 August: Imre Simon, Hungarian-born Brazilian mathematician and computer scientist (died 2009)
- 26 August: Dori Caymmi, singer, guitarist, songwriter, arranger, and producer, son of Dorival Caymmi

=== September ===
- 3 September: Waly Salomão, poet (died 2003)
- 19 September: Cesar Camargo Mariano, pianist, arranger, composer and music producer
- 12 November: Claudio Slon, jazz musician (died 2002)

== Deaths ==
- 20 February - Elsie Houston, singer (born 1902; suicide)
- date unknown - Vittorio Capellaro, Italian Brazilian film director, film producer, film actor, and screenwriter (born 1877)

== See also ==
- 1943 in Brazilian football
- List of Brazilian films of 1943
