= A Voz do Carnaval =

1933 film directed by Adhemar Gonzaga

- Directed by: Adhemar Gonzaga
- Produced by: Adhemar Gonzaga; Joracy Camargo Alvaro Rodrigues; Humberto Mauro
- Cinematography: A. Pereira Castro
- Release date: March 6, 1933
- Country: Brazil
- Language: Portuguese

A Voz do Carnaval (in English, literally The Carnival Voice) is a 1933 Brazilian short film documentary, directed by Adhemar Gonzaga and released by production company Cinédia. With no copies preserved, it is considered a lost film.

== Production ==
This semidocumentary was inspired by a story of Joracy Camargo and released on the eve of Rio Carnival. Using the Movietone sound system, it was the first Brazilian film to record optical sound directly from Rio streets. The documentary sequences filmed in the streets were interspersed with scenes filmed in the studio, showing comedian Palitos, in the role of King Momo. A sequence filmed in the studio of Radio Mayrink Veiga showed singer Carmen Miranda in her second film appearance, singing "E Bateu-se a Chapa", "Moleque Indigesto" and "Good-Bye".

A Voz do Carnaval was sponsored by the newspaper A Noite, and displayed simultaneously at Cine Odeon in Rio de Janeiro and Belo Horizonte on March 6, 1933. And in theaters Companhia Cine Brasil in Juiz de Fora through the Companhia Central Diversões. In Petrópolis in the Teatro Pedro II. A note published in the edition of the magazine Cinearte on June 15, 1933 said that the film was being displayed also in Porto Alegre.

== Cast ==
- Carmen Miranda
- Regina Mauro
- Belmira de Almeida
- Sônia Veiga
- Sarah Nobre
- Lu Marival
- Irmãos Tapajós
- Margarida Max
- Lamartine Babo
- Almirante
- Jararaca & Ratinho
- Jonjoca
- Castro Barbosa
- Orquestra da Guarda Velha
- Henrique Chaves
- Ferreira Maia
- Paulo Gonçalves
- Elza Moreno
- Paulina Mubarak
- Armando Louzada
- Edmundo Maia
