= Felicidad =

Felicidad may refer to:

- Felicidad (film) or Happiness, a 1957 Mexican film
- Felicidad Ogumoro (born 1949), Northern Mariana Islands politician

== Music ==
- Felicidad (album), Spanish-language version of Felicità, by Al Bano and Romina Power, 1982
- "Felicidad" (ABBA song), Spanish-language version of "Happy New Year", 1980
- "Felicidad" (Gloria Estefan song), 1996
- "Felicidad (Margherita)", a song by Boney M, 1980
- "La felicidad", a song by Palito Ortega, 1966
- "Felicidad", a song by BZN, 1978
- "Felicidad", a song by Sally Field, 1966

== See also ==
- Felicidade, a 1991–1992 Brazilian telenovela
- Felicidade, a Brazilian film of 1930
- Felicidades (disambiguation)
