= List of Brazilian films of 1930 =

A list of films produced in Brazil in 1930:

Title	Director	Cast	Genre	Notes
1930
Amor de Apache	Luiz de Barros	Carlo Campogalliani, Letizia Quaranta		
Amor e Patriotismo	Achiles Tartari	Cilo Aumas, Lello Aymoré, Antonio Carrari	Action	
Blood of Minas Gerais	Humberto Mauro	Maury Bueno, Ernani de Paula, Pedro Fantol	Drama	
Canções Brasileiras	Luiz de Barros	Genésio Arruda, Tom Bill, Vicenzo Caiaffa		
Felicidade	José Carrari, Alberto Cerri	Bidu Sayão		
Lábios sem Beijos	Humberto Mauro	Lelita Rosa, Paulo Morano, Didi Viana	Romantic drama	
Messalina	Luiz de Barros	Vicenzo Caiaffa, Remo Cesarini, Nélson de Oliveira	Drama	
O Babão	Luiz de Barros	Genésio Arruda, Tom Bill, Rina Weiss	Musical comedy	
Photo 13	Achiles Tartari	Ubi Alvarado, Arlindo Amaral, Lello Aymoré	Adventure	
The Weapons (As Armas)	Octavio Gabus Mendes	Maria Cobus, Mechita Cobus, Américo de Freitas	Drama	

== See also ==
- 1930 in Brazil
