= 1887 in Brazil =

Events in the year 1887 in Brazil.

== Incumbents ==
- Monarch: Pedro II
- Prime Minister: João Alfredo Correia de Oliveira

== Events ==
- June – The Clube Militar, founded by Benjamin Constant and Deodoro da Fonseca, holds its first meeting.
- Rodrigues Alves, future President of Brazil, becomes president of the province of São Paulo.
- Italian ethnologist Guido Boggiani travels through the interior of Brazil, Bolivia and Paraguay to document the lives of Indians in the region.
- Maragogi is granted the status of a town.

== Births ==
- March 5 – Heitor Villa-Lobos, composer (died 1959)
- April 19 – Lucílio de Albuquerque, painter (died 1939)
- May 15 – José Joaquim Moniz de Aragão, diplomat (died 1974)
- May 16 – Maria Lacerda de Moura, anarchist, feminist, journalist and writer (died 1945)

== Deaths ==
- date unknown – William Hadfield, British writer, specialist in Brazil (born 1806)
