= 1939 in Brazil =

Events in the year 1939 in Brazil.

== Incumbents ==
=== Federal government ===
- President: Getúlio Vargas

=== Governors ===
- Alagoas: Osman Laurel
- Amazonas: Álvaro Botelho Maia
- Bahia: Landulfo Alves
- Ceará: Francisco de Meneses Pimentel
- Espírito Santo: João Punaro Bley
- Goiás: Pedro Ludovico Teixeira
- Maranhão:
- Mato Grosso: Júlio Strübing Müller
- Minas Gerais: Benedito Valadares Ribeiro
- Pará: José Carneiro da Gama Malcher
- Paraíba: Argemiro de Figueiredo
- Paraná: Manuel Ribas
- Pernambuco: Agamenon Magalhães
- Piauí: Leônidas Melo
- Rio Grande do Norte: Rafael Fernandes Gurjão
- Rio Grande do Sul: Osvaldo Cordeiro de Farias
- Santa Catarina: Nereu Ramos
- São Paulo: Ademar de Barros
- Sergipe: Erônides de Carvalho

=== Vice governors ===
- Rio Grande do Norte: no vice governor
- São Paulo: no vice governor

== Events ==
- 27 June – The municipality of Canoas obtains city status.
- 30 November – Serra dos Órgãos National Park is created
- 5 December – The Imperial Mausoleum is officially inaugurated at the Cathedral of Petrópolis.

== Arts and culture ==
=== Films ===
- El Grito de la juventud (Argentine film directed by Brazilian director Raul Roulien)

=== Music ===
- Ary Barroso - "Aquarela do Brasil"

== Births ==
- 2 February - Maximira Figueiredo, actress (died 2018)
- 8 February - Jonas Bloch, actor
- 14 March - Glauber Rocha, film director, actor and writer (died 1981).
- 30 April - Axel Schmidt-Preben, Olympic sailor (died 2018)
- 13 June - Antônio Pitanga, actor
- 26 July - Heloísa Teixeira, writer (died 2025)
- 16 October - Suely Franco, actress and entertainer

== Deaths ==
- 19 April - Lucílio de Albuquerque, painter (born 1887).
- 16 October - Malvina Tavares, anarchist, poet, and educator (born 1866)
- 25 November - Odette Vidal de Oliveira, candidate for beatification (born 1930).

== See also ==
- 1939 in Brazilian football
- List of Brazilian films of 1939
