= Argila =

Argila may refer to:

- Argila (moth), a genus of moths in the subfamily Lymantriinae
- Argila (1940 film), a 1940 Brazilian film
- Argila (1969 film), a 1969 West German film
- Argila (footballer) (born 1920), Spanish footballer
