= Comello =

Comello is a surname. Notable people with the surname include:

- Anthony Comello, American murderer
- Eva Comello (1909–1990), Egyptian-born Brazilian actress
- Lodovica Comello (born 1990), Italian actress, singer, and dancer
