= Mulher (film) =

1931 film

- Directed by: Octavio Gabus Mendes
- Screenplay by: Adhemar Gonzaga; Octavio Gabus Mendes
- Produced by: Adhemar Gonzaga
- Starring: Carmem Violeta; Celso Montenegro; Ruth Gentil; Luís Soroa
- Cinematography: Humberto Mauro
- Production company: Cinédia
- Release date: 12 October 1931 (Brazil)
- Running time: 70 minutes
- Country: Brazil
- Language: Portuguese

Mulher is a 1931 Brazilian film directed by Octávio Gabus Mendes, and starring Carmen Violeta and Celso Montenegro.

== Cast ==
- Carmem Violeta ... Carmem
- Celso Montenegro ... Flávio
- Ruth Gentil ... Lígia
- Luís Soroa ... Arthur
- Gina Cavalieri ... Lúcia
- Carlos Eugênio ... Oswaldo
- Milton Marinho ... Milton
- Ernane Augusto ... Butler
- Augusta Guimarães ... Carmem's Mother
- Humberto Mauro ... Carmem's Stepfather
