= Eva Nil =

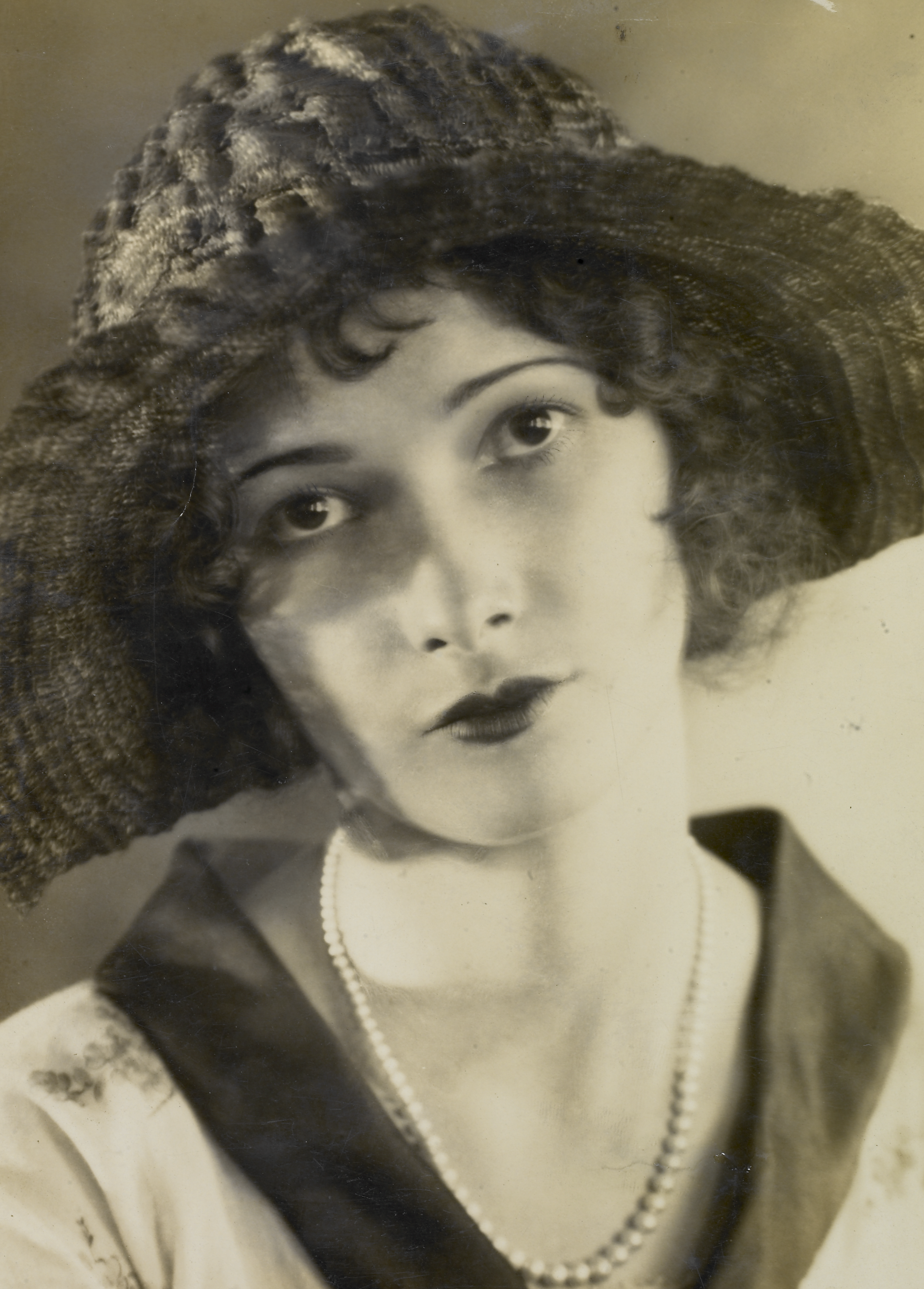
- Born: June 25, 1909; Cairo, Egypt
- Died: August 15, 1990 (aged 81)
- Occupation: Actress

Eva Nil (25 June 1909 – 15 August 1990), born Eva Comello, was an Egyptian-born Brazilian film actress.

== Early life ==
Eva Comello was born in Cairo in 1909, the daughter of Ida Tonetti and Pietro Comello, both born in Italy. Her father was a photographer who became a filmmaker in Brazil after they immigrated in Eva's childhood.

== Career ==
"Eva Nil" (also seen as Eva Nill), her chosen screen name, refers to her Egyptian birth, on the Nile River. Silent films featuring Eva Nil included Valadião, o Cratera (1925, "Valadião, the Crater", a short by Comello and his filmmaking partner Humberto Mauro), Na Primera da Vida (1925, "The Spring of Life", also by Mauro), Senhorita Agora Mesmo (1928, "Miss Right Now", with Comello as cinematographer, producer, director, and actor), and Barro Humano (1929, by Adhemar Gonzaga). She was counted among the melindrosas, modern young actresses of 1920s cinema in Brazil. None of her film appearances have survived, though there are some existing stills.

In 1978, archival footage of Nil was featured in a documentary about women in film, Mulheres de Cinema.

== Personal life ==
Eva Nil died in 1990, aged 81 years, in Cataguases, Minas Gerais, where she had lived for many years after retiring from film work.
