= 1930 in Brazil =

Events in the year 1930 in Brazil.

== Incumbents ==
=== Federal government ===
- President:
  - (until 24 October) Washington Luís
  - (from 24 October to 3 November) General Tasso Fragoso, Admiral Isaías de Noronha, General Mena Barreto
  - (from 3 November) Getúlio Vargas (Head of the Provisional Government)
- Vice President: Fernando de Melo Viana (until 24 October), vacant after 24 October.

=== Governors ===
- Alagoas:
  - till 10 October: Álvaro Correia Pais
  - 10 October-14 October: Pedro Reginaldo Teixeira
  - from 14 October: Hermilo de Freitas Blackbird
- Amazonas:
  - till 1 January: Ifigênio Ferreira de Sales
  - 1 January-24 October: Dorval Pires Porto
  - 24 October-1 November: Government Junta
  - 1 November-20 November: Floriano da Silva Machado
  - from 20 November: Álvaro Botelho Maia
- Bahia: Vital Soares, then Frederico Augusto Rodrigues da Costa, then Leopoldo Afrânio Bastos do Amaral
- Ceará:
  - till 8 October: José Carlos de Matos Peixoto
  - from 8 October: Manuel Fernandes Távora
- Goiás:
  - till 11 August: Alfredo Lopes de Morais
  - 11 August - 27 October: Humberto Martins Ribeiro
  - 27 - 30 October: Carlos Pinheiro Chagas
  - 30 October - 23 November: Goiana Governing Board of 1930
  - from 23 November: Pedro Ludovico Teixeira
- Maranhão:
  - till 1 March: José Magalhães de Almeida
  - 1 March - 8 October: José Pires Sexto
  - 8 October - 14 November: Maranhão Governing Board of 1930
  - 15 November - 27 November: Luso Torres
  - from 27 November: José Maria Perdigão
- Mato Grosso: Mário Correia da Costa, then Aníbal Benício de Toledo, then Sebastião Rabelo Leite, then Antonino Mena Gonçalves
- Minas Gerais:
  - until 7 September: Antônio Carlos Ribeiro de Andrada
  - from 7 September: Olegário Maciel
- Pará:
  - until 24 October: Eurico de Freitas Vale
  - 24 October - 26 October: Pará Governing Board of October 1930
  - 26 October - 28 October: Landry Sales Gonçalves
  - 28 October - 12 November: Pará Governing Board of 1930
  - from 12 November: Joaquim de Magalhães Barata
- Paraíba:
  - until 26 July: João Pessoa Cavalcanti
  - 26 July - 4 October: Álvaro Pereira de Carvalho
  - 4 October - 26 November: José Américo de Almeida
  - from 26 November: Antenor de França Navarro
- Paraná:
  - Afonso Camargo
  - Mário Alves Monteiro Tourinho
- Pernambuco:
  - until 28 May: Estácio Coimbra
  - 28 May - 6 October: Júlio Celso de Albuquerque Belo
  - from 6 October: Carlos de Lima Cavalcanti
- Piauí:
  - till 4 October: João de Deus Pires Leal
  - from 4 October: Humberto de Areia Leão
- Rio Grande do Norte:
  - till 5 October: Juvenal Lamartine de Faria
  - 5-12 October: Military Governing Board, consisting of: Luis Tavares Guerreiro, Abelardo Torres da Silva Castro, and Julius Perouse Bridges
  - from 12 October: Irenaeus Jofili
- Rio Grande do Sul:
  - till 9 October: Getúlio Dornelles Vargas
  - 9-27 October: Osvaldo Euclides de Sousa Aranha
  - 27-28 October: Sinval Saldanha
  - from 28 October: José Antônio Flores da Cunha
- Santa Catarina: Adolfo Konder (until 29 September), Fulvius Aducci (29 September-25 October)
- São Paulo: Julio Prestes (until 24 October)
- Sergipe: Manuel Correia Dantas (until 17 October)

=== Vice governors ===
- Rio Grande do Norte: Joaquim Inácio (until 5 October)
- São Paulo: Heitor Teixeira Penteado (until 21 May)

== Events ==
- 1 March - A general election is held; Júlio Prestes of the Republican Party of São Paulo, receives 57.7% of the vote and is elected president. Vital Soares is elected vice-president, but never takes office.
- 16 July - Our Lady of Aparecida is proclaimed the Patroness of Brazil, by decree of Pope Pius XI.
- 26 July - The assassination of João Pessoa Cavalcânti de Albuquerque, governor of Paraíba, by João Duarte Dantas, stirs up a wave of bad feeling toward the federal government and the outgoing president Washington Luís, who is accused of bearing the "moral responsibility".
- 13 August - 1930 Curuçá River event: The area of Curuçá River near latitude 5° S and longitude 71.5° W experiences a meteoric air burst (also known as the Brazilian Tunguska event).
- September - The state capital of Paraíba, formerly Parahyba, is renamed João Pessoa, in memory of its assassinated governor.
- 3 October - Nationwide outbreak of the Revolution of 1930.
- 24 October - Incumbent President Washington Luís is deposed. A military junta, led by General Augusto Tasso Fragoso, temporarily takes control of the country.
- 1 November - Beginning of the Vargas Era: the ruling junta hands power and the presidential palace to Getúlio Vargas.
- 18 November - A decree is signed creating the Brazilian Bar Association.
- date unknown - The National Institute of Metrology Standardization and Industrial Quality (INMETRO) is founded.

== Arts and culture ==
=== Films ===
- As Armas, directed by Octavio Gabus Mendes

== Births ==
- 22 February - Aracy Amaral, art historian and curator (died 2026)
- 29 March - Lima Duarte, actor
- 21 April - Mário Covas, politician (died 2003)
- 24 April - José Sarney, 31st President of Brazil
- 7 June - Dolores Duran, Brazilian singer, songwriter (died 1959)
- 28 June - Itamar Franco, 33rd President of Brazil (died 2011)
- 10 July - Jacques Klein, composer (died 1982)
- 22 August - Gylmar dos Santos Neves, footballer (died 2013)
- 28 August - Walmor Chagas, actor (died 2013)
- 16 August - Glauce Rocha, actress (died 1971)
- 2 September - Paulo Francis, journalist, novelist and critic (died 1997)
- 10 September - Ferreira Gullar (José Ribamar Ferreira), poet, playwright, essayist, art critic, and television writer
- 15 September - Odette Vidal de Oliveira, candidate for beatification (died 1939)
- 19 September - Ruth Cardoso, anthropologist, educator and public figure (died 2008)
- 29 October - Geraldo Del Rey, actor (died 1993)
- 12 December - Silvio Santos, television presenter (died 2024)

== Deaths ==
- 26 July - João Pessoa Cavalcânti de Albuquerque, politician (born 1878; assassinated)

== See also ==
- 1930 in Brazilian football
- List of Brazilian films of 1930
