= O Descobrimento do Brasil =

O Descobrimento do Brasil may refer to:

- O Descobrimento do Brasil (film), a 1936 Brazilian film
- O Descobrimento do Brasil (album), a 1993 album by Brazilian rock band Legião Urbana
