= Barro Humano =

1929 film

- Directed by: Adhemar Gonzaga
- Written by: Adhemar Gonzaga; Paulo Vanderlei
- Starring: Gracia Morena; Lelita Rosa; Eva Schnoor; Carlos Modesto
- Cinematography: Paulo Benedetti
- Distributed by: Cinearte Films; Benedetti Films; Paramount Pictures
- Release date: 1929
- Country: Brazil
- Language: Portuguese

Barro Humano is a 1929 Brazilian film directed by Adhemar Gonzaga, starring Gracia Morena, Lelita Rosa, Carlos Modesto and Eva Schnoor in the main roles. Carmen Miranda would have appeared as an extra in a scene.

== Cast ==
- Gracia Morena ... Vera
- Lelita Rosa ... Gilda
- Eva Schnoor ... Helena
- Eva Nil ... Diva
- Carlos Modesto ... Mário
- Martha Torá ... Emília
- Luiza Valle ... Dona Chincha
- Oli Mar ... Juquinha
- Lia Renée ... Lia
- Carmem Violeta ... Dançarina de tango
- Gina Cavalieri ... Amiga de Helena

== Bibliography ==
- GOMES, Paulo Emilio Sales. Humberto Mauro, Cataguases, Cinearte. São Paulo: Perspectiva, 1974.
- GONZAGA, Alice. 50 Anos de Cinédia. Rio de Janeiro, Record, 1987.
- MIRANDA, Luis Felipe. Dicionário de Cineastas brasileiros. São Paulo: Art Editora, 1990.
- RAMOS, Fernão e MIRANDA, Luis Felipe. Enciclopédia do Cinema Brasileiro. São Paulo: Senac, 2000.
- SCHVARZMAN, Sheila. Filmando a Mulher no Cinema Mudo Brasileiro. Accesso: RG(A) - ArtCultura, v. 7, n. 10, jan.-jun. 2005. p. 55-64
- SOUTO, Gilberto. O Cinema Novo dos anos vinte. Filme e Cultura, n.4, pp. 40–2, abril 1967.
- XAVIER, Ismail. Sétima Arte: um culto moderno. São Paulo: Perspectiva, 1978.
