= Espertirina Martins =

Brazilian anarchist activist

- Born: 16 December 1903; Lajeado
- Died: 22 December 1942 (aged 39); Porto Alegre

Espertirina Augusta Martins (16 December, 1903 – 22 December, 1942) was a Brazilian anarchist and feminist activist.

== Early life ==
Espertirina Martins was born in 1903, in Lajeado, in the state of Rio Grande do Sul, daughter of Theophilo Augusto Martins and Laura de Azambuja Reichenbach Martins, anarchist militants. She had six siblings.

== Political activity ==
Since her childhood, Martins was already involved with the country's workers movement, distributing printed materials with political information, or participating in rallies, assemblies, meetings and protests. She was a student at the Modern School ran by the anarchist educator Malvina Tavares. Her sister Dulcina was married to fellow anarchist Djalma Fettermann.

Among all the performances she was involved with, arguably the most notable is the so-called Folded Arms Strike, a strike that took place in the city of Porto Alegre in 1917, one of the several strikes happening in Brazil that year. In this context, Espertirina participated in a funeral procession in protest for the murder of a worker in the midst of a strike. She was in front of the procession with a bouquet of flowers in her hand, at the same time the Military Brigade approached the opposite direction of the avenue to suppress the movement.

When the groups arrived close, she threw her bouquet, which hid a bomb, on the soldiers, and managed to blow up half their troops.

She married Artur Fabião Carneiro in Rio de Janeiro. The couple moved to São Paulo, where they worked at the Eclectica advertising agency and were in touch with Edgard Leuenroth and the anarchist movement of the city.

== Death ==
Martins died at age of 39, of an appendicitis caused by childbirth complications.

== Legacy ==
In 2016, in Belo Horizonte, an occupation was carried out with the name "Occupation Tina Martins" in memory of Espertirina. The group consisted of women who occupied an abandoned building in the city in protests to denounce domestic violence and to claim the construction of day care centers and shelters. After 87 days of protests and occupation, the movement organized by the Movement of Women Olga Benario and the Movimento de Luta nos Bairros, Vilas e Favelas won through several negotiations with the government the creation of the first shelter home in Latin America, Casa de Referência da Mulher Tina Martins.
