= Leonora of the Seven Seas =

1955 film directed by Carlos Hugo Christensen

- Directed by: Carlos Hugo Christensen
- Written by: Pedro Bloch; Carlos Hugo Christensen
- Produced by: Roberto Acácio; Mário Aldrá
- Cinematography: Mario Pagés
- Edited by: José Cañizares
- Music by: Guerra Peixe; Enrico Simonetti
- Production companies: Artistas Associados; Unifilme Cinematográfica
- Distributed by: Pelmex
- Release date: 1955
- Country: Brazil
- Language: Portuguese

Leonora of the Seven Seas (Portuguese:Leonora dos sete mares) is a 1955 Brazilian mystery film directed by Carlos Hugo Christensen.

== Cast ==
- Sadi Cabral
- Wilza Carla
- Annie Carol
- Edgar Cassitas
- Miro Cerni
- Arturo de Córdova
- Sérgio de Oliveira
- Modesto De Souza
- Moacyr Deriquém
- Bibi Ferreira
- Claudiano Filho
- Jardel Filho
- Susana Freyre
- Heloísa Helena
- Labanca
- Anilza Leoni
- Armando Louzada
- Oswaldo Louzada
- Rodolfo Mayer
- Arnaldo Paulo Montel
- Paulo Montel
- Henriette Morineau
- Elza Mumme
- Sara Nobre
- Adriano Reys
- Maria Luiza Splendore
- Afonso Stuart
- Solano Trindade

== Bibliography ==
- Plazaola, Luis Trelles. South American Cinema. La Editorial, UPR, 1989.
