= Aldir Júnior =

Brazilian politician (born 1993)

Member-elect of the Chamber of Deputies
- Assuming office 1 February 2027
- Constituency: Maranhão

Member of the Municipal Chamber of São Luís
- Incumbent
- Assumed office 1 January 2017
- Constituency: At-large

Personal details
- Born: Aldir Cunha Rodrigues Júnior; 16 January 1993 (age 33) Parambu, Ceará, Brazil
- Party: PL
- Profession: Civil engineer

Aldir Cunha Rodrigues Júnior (born 16 January 1993) is a Brazilian politician who was elected member of the Chamber of Deputies in 2026. He has been a municipal councillor of São Luís since 2017.
