= Argila (1940 film) =

1940 film

- Directed by: Humberto Mauro
- Screenplay by: Humberto Mauro
- Produced by: Carmen Santos
- Cinematography: Humberto Mauro, Manoel Ribeiro
- Edited by: Hippólito Collomb, Watson Macedo
- Music by: Radamés Gnatalli, Edgar Roquette-Pinto, Heckel Tavares
- Production company: Brasil Vita Filmes
- Release date: 1940
- Running time: 103 minutes
- Country: Brazil
- Language: Portuguese

Argila is a 1940 Brazilian romantic drama film directed by Humberto Mauro. The film stars Carmen Santos, Celso Guimarães, and Lídia Mattos.

== Cast ==
- Carmen Santos as Luciana
- Celso Guimarães as Gilberto
- Lídia Mattos as Marina
- Floriano Faissal as Barrocas
- Saint Clair Lopes as Claudio
- Bandeira Duarte
- Mauro de Oliveira
- J. Silveira
- Pérola Negra
- Roberto Rocha
- Anita Otero as Dancer
- Chaby Pinheir
- Geny França
- Bandeira de Mello
- Eduardo Viana
