= Minas Conspiracy (film) =

1948 film directed by Carmen Santos

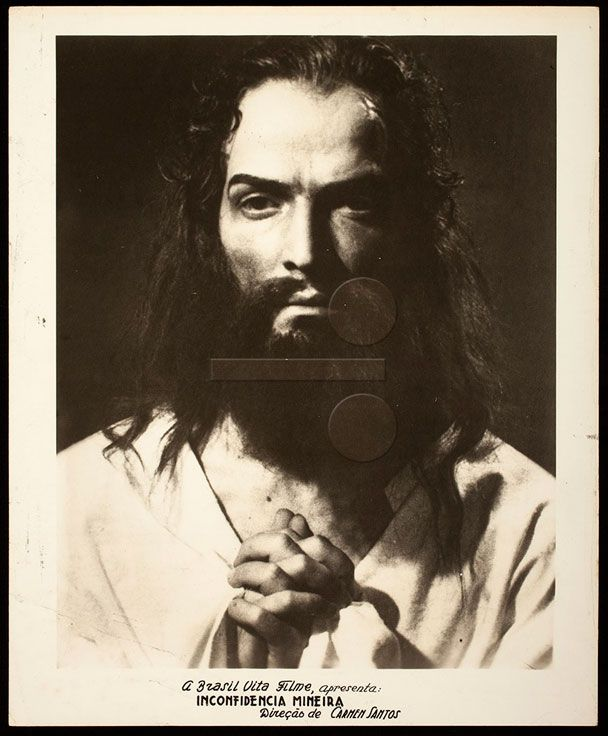
- Directed by: Carmen Santos
- Written by: Humberto Mauro; Henrique Pongetti; Carmen Santos
- Produced by: Carmen Santos
- Starring: Carmen Santos; Rodolfo Mayer; Roberto Lupo; Oswaldo Loureiro
- Cinematography: Edgar Brasil
- Edited by: Watson Macedo
- Production company: Brasil Vita Filmes
- Release date: 1948
- Country: Brazil
- Language: Portuguese

Minas Conspiracy (Portuguese: Inconfidência Mineira) is a 1948 Brazilian historical film directed by Carmen Santos and starring Santos, Rodolfo Mayer, and Roberto Lupo. The film portrays the 1789 Inconfidência Mineira, an unsuccessful attempt by some inhabitants of Minas Gerais to declare independence from Portugal. The film was produced by Brasil Vita Filmes, an independent studio controlled by Santos, who directed the film.

== Partial cast ==
- Rodolfo Mayer as Tiradentes
- Carmen Santos as Bárbara Heliodora
- Roberto Lupo
- Oswaldo Loureiro
- Augusto R. Chaves
- Antonia Marzullo
- Paulo Porto

== Bibliography ==
- Marsh, Leslie. Brazilian Women's Filmmaking: From Dictatorship to Democracy. University of Illinois Press, 2012.
