= Laranja da China =

1940 film directed by Ruy Costa

- Directed by: Ruy Costa
- Written by: Ruy Costa (story); João de Barro
- Produced by: Alberto Byington Jr.; Wallace Downey
- Cinematography: Moacyr Fenelon; Manoel Ribeiro
- Production company: Sonofilmes
- Release date: 12 January 1940
- Running time: 106 minutes
- Country: Brazil
- Language: Portuguese

Laranja da China is a Brazilian musical film released in 1940, produced by Wallace Downey and directed by Ruy Costa.

== Plot ==
Dr. Flores is a conservative citizen, he is member of the League Against Malandragem and forbids his daughter Camélia (Dircinha Batista) dating a bohemian sambista.

== Cast ==
- Barbosa Júnior ... Ferdinando Flores
- Nair Alves ... Perpétua
- Dircinha Batista ... Camélia
- Paulo Neto ... Chefe da Liga
- Lauro Borges ... Salchich
- Arnaldo Amaral ... Arnaldo
- Grande Otelo ... Boneco de Piche
- Pedro Vargas ...
- Carmen Miranda...
- César Ladeira ...
- Edmundo Maia ...
- Cora Costa ...
- Alvarenga ...
- Francisco Alves ...
- Manezinho Araújo ...
- Joel de Almeida ...
