= Onde Estás Felicidade? =

1939 film directed by Mesquitinha

- Directed by: Mesquitinha
- Screenplay by: Mesquitinha
- Based on: Luis Iglesias (play)
- Produced by: Adhemar Gonzaga
- Starring: Alma Flora; Rodolfo Mayer; Luiza Nazareth; Nilza Magrassi
- Cinematography: A.P. Castro
- Music by: Radamés Gnattali; Luciano Perrone
- Production company: Cinédia
- Release date: 17 April 1939 (Brazil)
- Running time: 90 minutes
- Country: Brazil
- Language: Portuguese

Onde Estás Felicidade? is a 1939 Brazilian film produced by Adhemar Gonzaga and directed by Mesquitinha. The film is based on the 1933 novel of the same name by Luis Iglesias.

== Cast ==
Original cast
Actor	Role
Alma Flora	Madame Noêmia
Rodolfo Mayer	Paulo
Luiza Nazareth	Tia Clodomira "Clodô"
Nilza Magrassi	Fernandinha
Wanda Marchetti	Madame Lúcia "Lulu"
Dircinha Batista	Srta. Nonoca
Oscar Soares	Napoleão
Mesquitinha	Félix
Carlos Barbosa	Sr. Pereira
Paulo Gracindo	Dr. André
Lourdes Mayer	Senhorita
Grande Otelo	Sebastião
Abel Pêra	Sr. Borges
Manoel Pêra	
