= Noites Cariocas =

1936 film directed by Enrique Cadícamo

- publicity still from the film.
- Directed by: Enrique Cadícamo
- Written by: Enrique Cadícamo; F. Gianetti (story)
- Produced by: Caio Brant
- Cinematography: Adam Jacko
- Edited by: Raul de Castro; Juanita Jacko
- Music by: Caio Brant
- Distributed by: Cinédia; Uiara Film S.A. Distribuidora de Filmes Brasileiros (DFB)
- Release date: 1936
- Countries: Brazil; Argentina
- Languages: Portuguese; Spanish

Noites Cariocas (Noches cariocas in Argentina) is a 1936 Brazilian-Argentine comedy film directed and written by Enrique Cadícamo. It is based on a story by F. Gianetti. The film was released in both Portuguese and Spanish.

== Main cast ==
- Eduardo Arouca
- Mendonça Balsemão
- Montenegro Bentes
- Lourdinha Bittencourt
- Sadi Cabral
- Carambola
- Walter D'Ávila
- Olavo de Barros
- Abel Dourado
- Silva Filho
- Chaves Florence
- Jardel Jercolis
- Ana Maria Machado
- Carlos Machado
- Conceição Machado
- Mesquitinha
- Oscarito
- Grande Otelo
- Maria Luisa Palomero
- Carlos Perelli
- Lita Prado
- Pery Ribas
- Henriqueta Romanita
- Albertina Salkovsa
- Lódia Silva
- Manoel Vieira
- Carlos Vivan
