= Tasso Fragoso =

Coordinates: 8°28′S 45°45′W

- Municipality
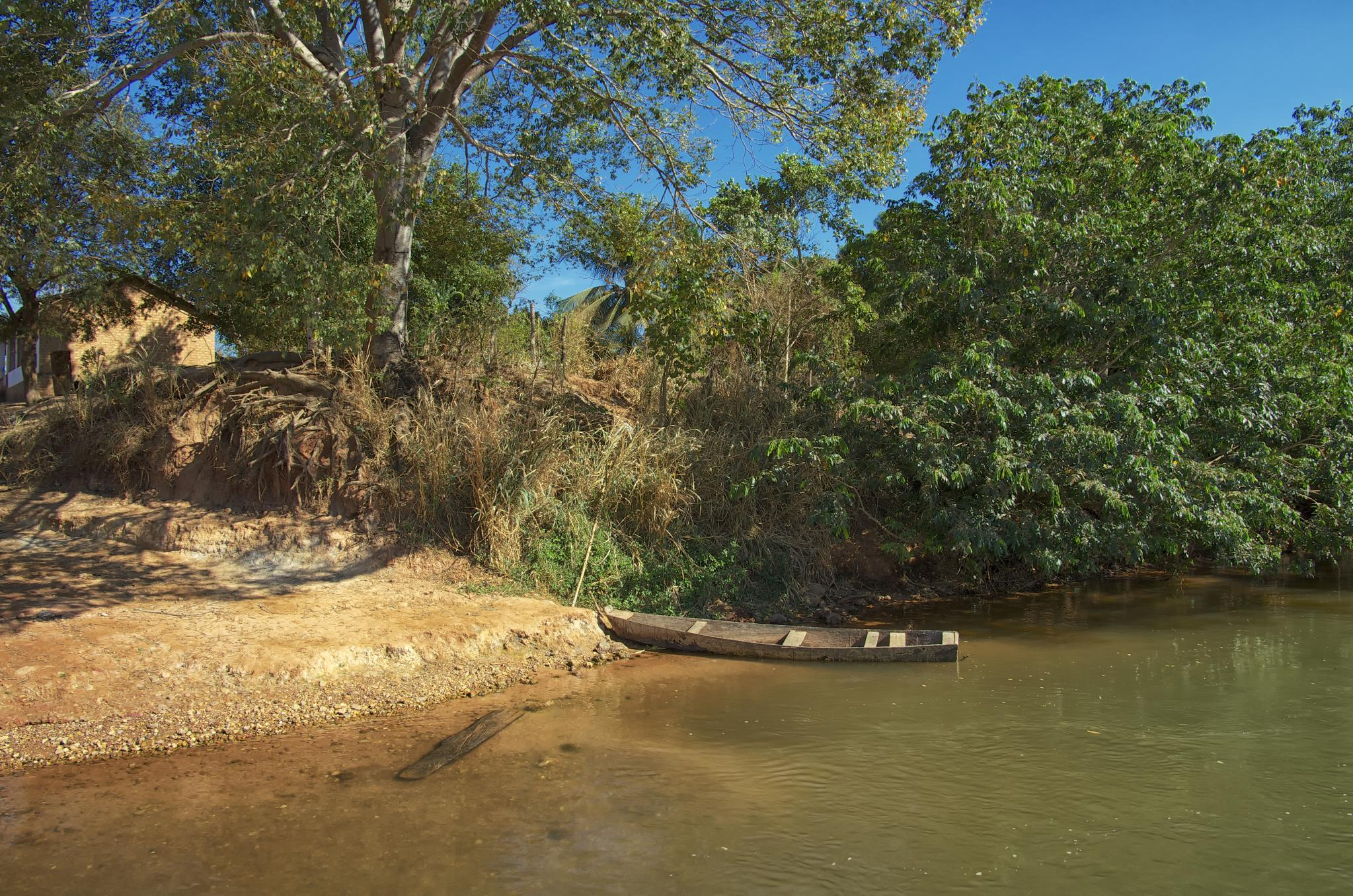

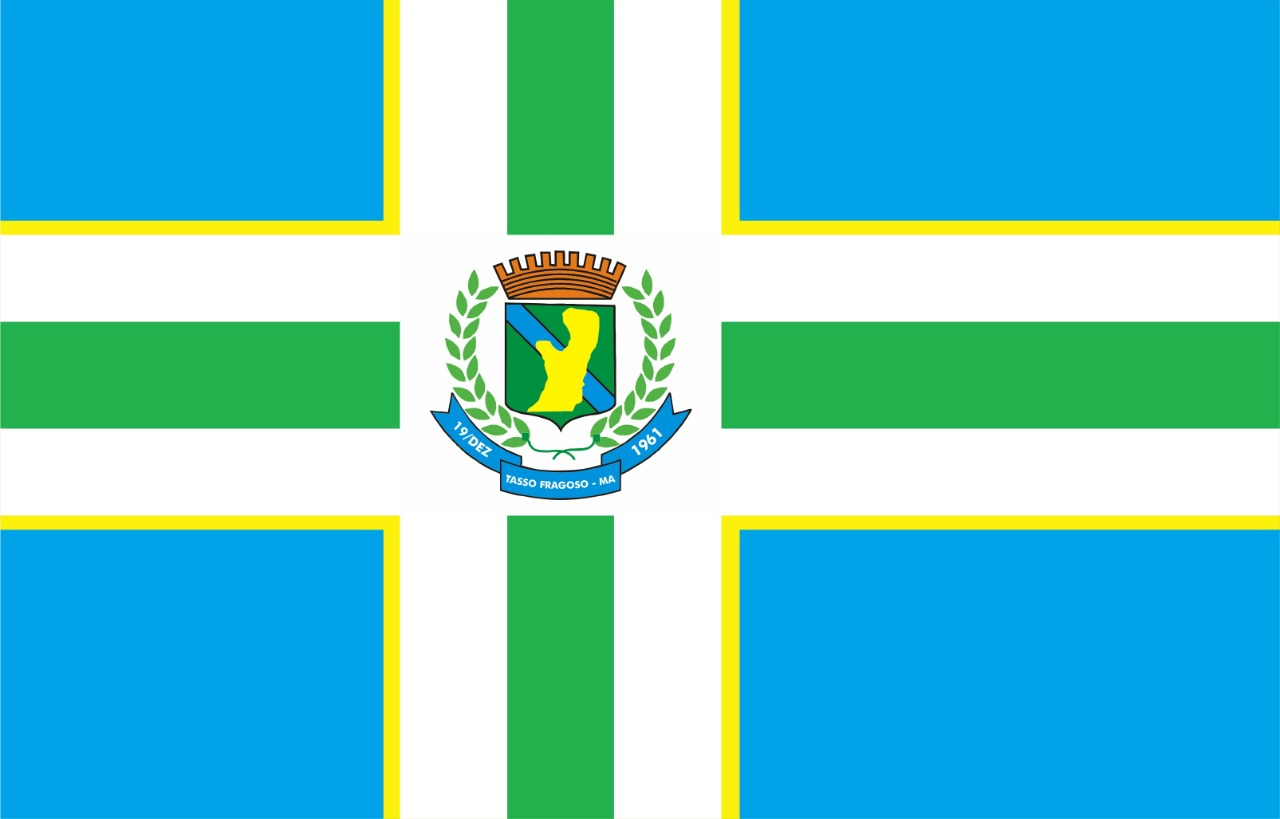
- Flag
- Interactive map of Tasso Fragoso
- Country: Brazil
- Region: Nordeste
- State: Maranhão
- Mesoregion: Sul Maranhense

Population (2020)
  - Total: 8,582
- Time zone: UTC−3 (BRT)

Tasso Fragoso is a municipality in the state of Maranhão in the Northeast region of Brazil.

== See also ==
- List of municipalities in Maranhão
