= Blood of Minas Gerais =

1930 film

- Directed by: Humberto Mauro
- Written by: Humberto Mauro
- Produced by: Agenor Cortes de Barros; Homero Cortes Domingues; Carmen Santos
- Cinematography: Edgar Brasil
- Production company: Phebo Filme
- Release date: 7 January 1930
- Running time: 82 minutes
- Country: Brazil
- Languages: Silent; Portuguese intertitles

Blood of Minas Gerais (Portuguese: Sangue Mineiro) is a 1930 Brazilian silent drama film directed by Humberto Mauro. The film is set around Belo Horizonte, where it was filmed. It was Mauro's final film for the small Phebo Filme company before he moved to the much better funded Cinédia studio in Rio de Janeiro.

== Synopsis ==
The daughter of a millionaire attempts to commit suicide after being spurned by her lover.

== Cast ==
- Maury Bueno as Christovam
- Ernani de Paula
- Pedro Fantol as Juliano Sampaio
- Rosendo Franco as Franco
- Adhemar Gonzaga as Carmem's Father
- Luiz Guimarães
- Augusta Leal as Aunt Marta
- Humberto Mauro as Farmer's servant
- Nita Ney as Neusa
- Carmen Santos as Carmem
- Máximo Serrano as Máximo
- Elie Sone as Tuty
- Luis Soroa as Roberto

== Bibliography ==
- Shaw, Lisa & Dennison, Stephanie. Brazilian National Cinema. Routledge, 2014.
