= Guido Boggiani =

Italian artist (1861–1902)

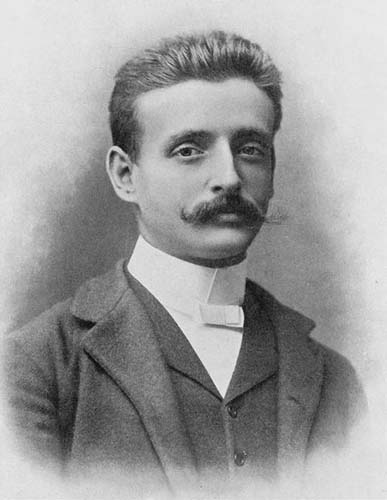
- Born: 20 September 1861; Omegna, Italy
- Died: 7 May 1902 (aged 40); La Victoria, Paraguay
- Education: Brera Academy, Milan
- Scientific career
- Fields: Ethnology
- Workplaces: Chaco, Paraguay

Guido Boggiani (1861–1902) was an Italian painter, draftsman, photographer, and ethnologist who in 1887 traveled through the interior of Brazil, Bolivia and Paraguay to document the lives of Indians in the region. Now hailed as a "pioneer of fieldwork" in Italian ethnology, he was ritually killed by natives in 1902.

== Early years, Italy ==
Guido Boggiani was born on 20 September 1861 in Omegna (Province of Verbano-Cusio-Ossola) to Giuseppe Boggiani and Clelia Gené. From his father, Giuseppe inherited a passion for the arts, especially painting. When he was 17, and after studying general culture, Boggiani went to the Brera Academy (Milan) to study painting. He was taught by Filippo Carcano, becoming a prominent landscape painter. In 1883 Boggiani exhibited six paintings for the first time in Palazzo delle Belle Arti (Rome). Among these were La raccolta delle castagne (Gathering of Chesnuts) and Scogli di Sant'Anna. His painting La raccolta delle castagne was acquired by the National Museum of Modern Art in Rome for about 6,000 pounds, a price considered high at that time. At the 1887 Exhibition in Venice, he displayed Gli ulivi a Francavilla al Mare; Sentiero a Lago Maggiore, Villaggio sul Lago Maggiore, and Ortensie.

In 1887, when 26, Boggiani undertook a journey to Argentina to show his paintings. In Buenos Aires he met several Italians who lived in Paraguay, and through the comments made, especially on the areas of Chaco and indigenous peoples, his fascination with Paraguay started.

== Later years, Paraguay ==
In 1888 Boggiani went to Asunción intending to trade in cattle and hides, then began his first expedition in the Gran Chaco. With the efforts of Don Juan De Cominges he reached Puerto Casado. Here he made his first contact with the Chamacoco Indians. He returned to Italy in 1893, bringing a collection of artifacts of great anthropological value, and started writing books based on his experiences.

In 1896 he returned to Asunción. This time equipped with a camera, tripod and all the elements for the development of glass plates, he was convinced that photography was the only way to study these peoples living in their little huts. In the end, besides his many books, his photographs (more than 500 were made from 1896 to 1901) earned him and the subjects of his art the interest and admiration of a wider audience; part of his collection was subsequently acquired by the Ethnological Museum of Berlin.

Boggiani was last seen by urban society on 24 October 1901, along with his assistant Félix Gavilan, when he left Asunción towards the Gran Chaco. In October 1902 Boggiani wrote for the last time to his brother Oliveira, writing of details of the expedition. It wasn't until 1904 that the Italian community of Asunción organized an expedition, led by the Spanish explorer José Fernandez Cancio, and on 20 October 1904 found the remains of Boggiani with his skull destroyed. It is supposed that the Chamacoco had split his head to prevent Boggiani and his camera from exerting more harm to their souls; in 1902 the American Anthropologist reported he had been killed "presumably at the hands of the Tobas Indians." His camera was found buried, and it is assumed many negatives too are buried. The actual remains of Boggiani are in a tomb in the Italian cemetery of Asunción.

Boggiani's work could be saved thanks to the Czech explorer and botanist Alberto Vojtěch Frič (1882–1944), who went to Paraguay a few years later and was able to recover all his belongings, thanks to his good relations with the natives. His grandson, Pavel Frič, later succeeded in developing all of the photographs, and the collection is reproduced in Guido Boggiani, Photographer (1997).

== Awards, honors ==
In Italy Boggiani was awarded, among others, the gold medal "Monaco di Bavaria." A museum in the town of San Lorenzo (Paraguay) bears his name, the Museum of Archaeology and Ethnography Guido Boggiani. A street in Asunción, Paraguay is also named after him.

== Bibliography ==
=== Works by Boggiani ===
- Notizie etnografiche sulla tribù dei Ciamacoco, etc. Atti della Società Romana di Antropologia. vol. 2. Rome: Società Romana per l'Antropologia, 1894.
- I Ciamacoco. Rome: Società Romana per l'Antropologia, 1894.
- With Vittorio Bottègo. Viaggi di scoperta nel cuore dell'Africa: Il Giuba esplorata. Rome: Loescher, 1895.
- I Caduvei (Mbayá o Guaicurú). Viaggio d'un artista nell'America Meridionale. Romer: Ermanno Loescher, 1895.
  - Os Caduveo. Translated and annotated. Biblioteca histórica brasileira 14. São Paulo: Livraria Martins Editôra, 1945.
- Tatuaggio o pittura? Studio intorno ad una curiosa usanza delle popolazioni indigene dell'antico Peru. Rome: Stabilimento Tipografico G. Civelli, 1895. (Extract from Atti del IIo Congresso Geografico Italiano, Roma, 22–27 settembre 1895.)
- Vocabolario dell'idioma ciamacoco. Extract from Atti della Società Romana per l'Antropologia; 2:1. Rome: 1894.
  - Vocabolario dell'idioma ciamacoco. Rev. Čestmír Loukotka. Buenos Aires, "Coni", 1929.
- Vocabolario dell'idioma guaná. (È comune anche alle tribù Ciapuchi,́ Sanapana,́ Angaite ́e Lengua o Petegmeḱ, e forse anche alla Pilaga ́o Pitipaga)́. Memoria di Guido Boggiani. Atti della R. Accademia dei Lincei. Rome, 1895.
- Apuntes sueltos de la lengua de los indios caduveos del Chaco paraguayo. Buenos Aires: Impr. y Papeleria La Buenos Aires, 1897.
- Nei dintorni di Corumbà (Brasile). Roma, Presso la Società geografica italiana, 1897.
- La Questione dei confini tra le repubbliche del Paraguay e della Bolivia. Roma, Presso la Società geografica italiana, 1897.
- "Etnografía del Alto Paraguay" 1898.
- "Guaicurú. Su nombre, posición geográfica, reporte étnico y lingüístico en la América Meridional". 1898.
- "En favor de los indios Chamacocos" 1898.
- "Los chamacocos"
- "Vocabulario del idioma chamacoco"
- "Los indios caigua del Alto Paraná (Misiones)"
- Discusiones sobre filología etnográfica y geografía histórica. Asunción: Guido Boggiani, 1899.
- Sobre ortografía de nombres geográficos guaraníes. Buenos Aires, Imprenta y litografía "La Buenos Aires," 1899.
- Compendio de etnografia Paraguaya moderna. Asunción, 1900.

=== Works on Boggiani ===
- Bertelli, Antonio de Padua. Os indios cavaleiros Guaycurus: fatos e acontecidos entre 1526 – 1986 no Pantanal do Mato Grosso. São Paulo: Uyara, 1987. In Portuguese.
- Boggiani y el Chaco: una aventura del siglo XIX: fotografías de la colección Frič. Buenos Aires: Museo de Arte Hispanoamericano Isaac Fernández Blanco, 2002.
- Bonati, Isabella. Guido Boggiani: Orme nell'ignoto. Turin: Il Tucano, 2006. ISBN 88-88473-10-6. In Italian.
- Comitato Pro-Boggiani (Asunción). Alla ricerca di Guido Boggiani. Spedizione Cancio nel Ciaco Boreale, Alto Paraguay. Relazione e documenti. Milano: Bontempelli, 1903.
- Diaz-Perez, Viriato, and Raúl Amarai. Coronario di Guido Boggiani. Palma de Mallorca: Luis Ropoli, 1977. ISBN 84-85048-35-0.
- Frič, Pavel, and Yvonna Fričová, eds. Guido Boggiani: Fotograf / Fotografo / Fotógrafo / Photographer. Prague: Titanic, 1997. ISBN 80-85909-25-1. A large-format book with prints and also text in Czech, Italian, Spanish, Portuguese, and English.
- Frič, Pavel, and Yvonna Fričová, eds. Guido Boggiani Fotografo. Lisbon: Museo Nacional de Etnologia, 2001. ISBN 972-776-089-9. In Portuguese.
- Lehmann-Nitsche, Robert, ed. La Colección Boggiani de Tipos Indigenas de Sudamérica Central / Die Sammlung Boggiani von Indianentypen ause dem zentralen Südamerika. Buenos Aires: R. Rosauer, 1904. A series of 100 postcards on those originating Paraguayans, which included a supplement of 12 naked special reserved for scientists.
- Leigheb, Maurizio. Lo sguardo del viaggiatore: vita e opere di Guido Boggiani. Novara: Interlinea, 1997. ISBN 88-8212-135-6.
- Leigheb, Maurizio, ed. Guido Boggiani: Pittore, esplatore, etnografo. Novara, 1986. Torino: Regione Piemonte, 1986.
- Leigheb, Maurizio, and Lino Cerutti, eds. Guido Boggiani – la vita i viaggio le opere: atti del Convegno internazionale, Novara, 8–9 marzo 1985 Novara: Banca Popolare di Novara, 1992.
- Pettazzoni, Raffaele. In Memoria di Guido Boggiani. Rome: Centro italiano di studi americani, 1941.
- Scotti, Pietro. I contributi americanistici di Guido Boggiani. Genova, Libreria degli studi, 1955.
- Scotti, Pietro. La seconda spedizione di Guido Boggiani fra i Caduvèi (1897). Genova: Libreria degli studi, 1963.
- Viviani, Alberto. Guido Boggiani: alla scoperta del Gran Chaco. Turin: Paravia, 1951.
- Vangelista, Chiara. "Un pittore etnografo e mercante: Scambi commerciali e osservazioni etnografiche di Guido Boggiani durante un viaggio tra i Cadiueu." In Fedora Giordano and Alberto Guaraldo (ed. and introd.), Gli indiani d'America e l'Italia, II. Alessandria, Italy: Orso, 2002. 61–77.
