= Dercy Gonçalves =

Brazilian comedian (1907–2008)

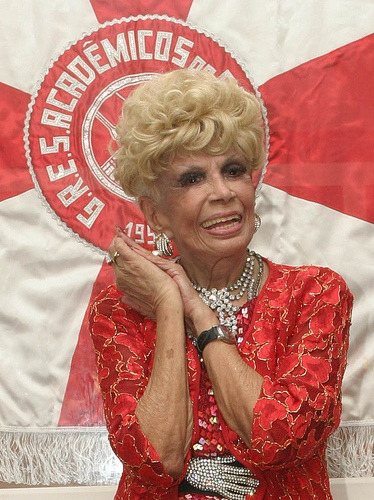
- Gonçalves in 2004
- Born: Dolores Gonçalves Costa; 23 June 1907; Santa Maria Madalena, Rio de Janeiro, Brazil
- Died: 19 July 2008 (aged 101); Rio de Janeiro, Brazil
- Years active: 1922–2008
- Height: 1.50 m (4 ft 11 in)
- Children: 1

Dolores Gonçalves Costa (23 June 1907 – 19 July 2008), known by her stage name Dercy Gonçalves, was a Brazilian actress, comedian and singer. In her 86-year-long career, she worked in the theater, revues, film, radio and television, becoming famous by her humorous use of vulgar language. In 1991, at the age of 84, she caused controversy by exposing her breasts while parading with a Samba school in Rio de Janeiro's Carnaval.

Gonçalves is recognized by Guinness World Records as having the longest acting career ever having acted from 1922 to 2008.

== Biography ==
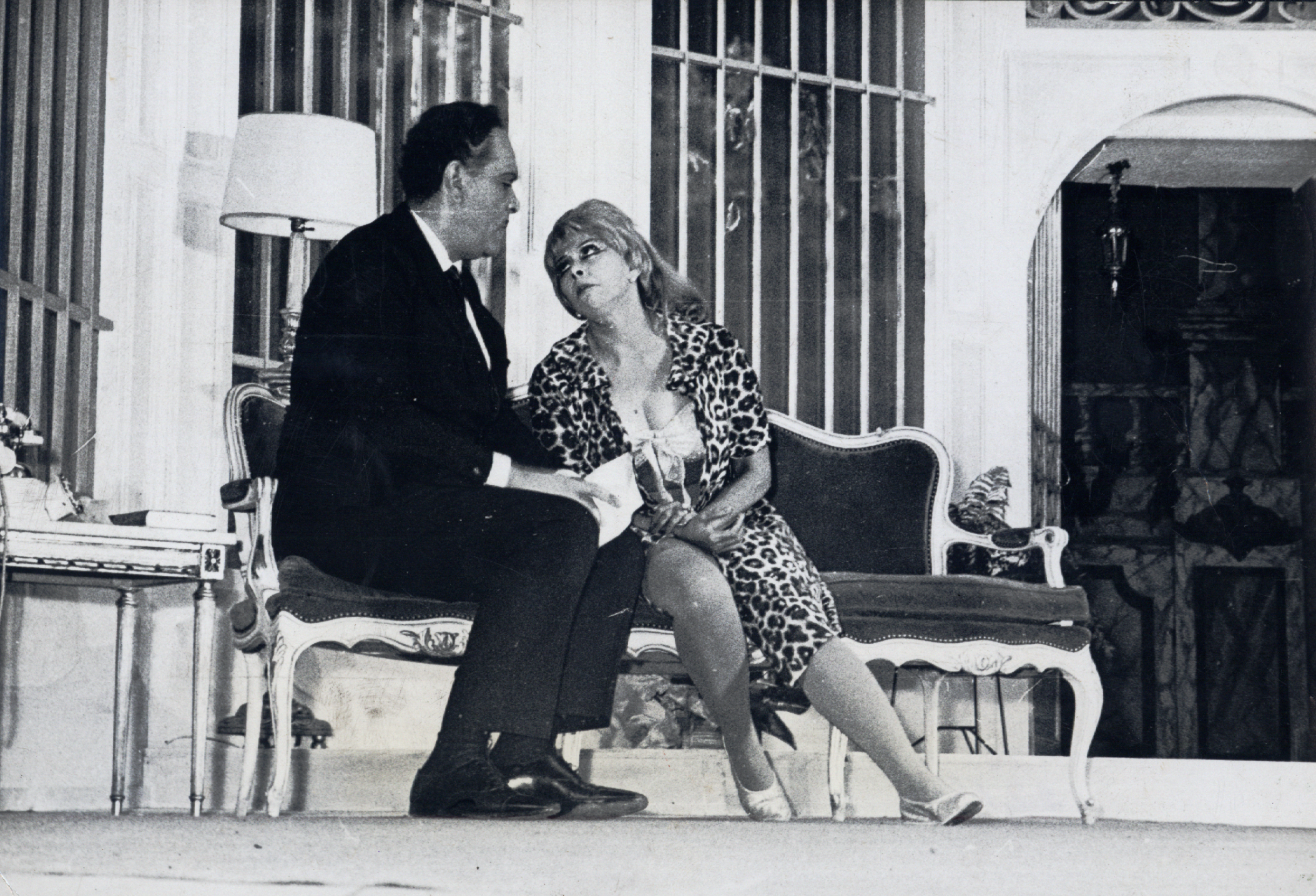
Dercy Gonçalves and Ribeiro Fortes, 1966

Dercy Gonçalves was biographed in 1994 by Maria Adelaide Amaral. The book was titled Dercy de Cabo a Rabo (a popular expression in Portuguese that means "from the beginning to the end", and in this particular case, "The complete Dercy"). Amaral also adapted her book into the 2012 miniseries Dercy de Verdade ("The true Dercy"). Dercy Gonçalves was portrayed by Luisa Périssé (teen), Heloísa Périssé (young) and Fafy Siqueira (older).

She died at 16:45 BRT on 19 July 2008 from pneumonia at the age of 101. She was buried in her birth town Santa Maria Madalena in Rio de Janeiro. Her mausoleum, designed by herself in 1991, has the shape of a glass pyramid and is unique in that she was buried standing up. The conception is similar to Louvre Pyramid.

== Filmography ==
Year	Title	Role	Notes
1943	Samba in Berlin		
1944	Romance Proibido	Dercy	
1944	Abacaxi azul		
1946	Caídos do Céu	Rita Naftalina	
1948	Folias Cariocas		
1955	Feitiço do Amazonas		
1956	Depois Eu Conto	Ofélia Canabrava	
1957	Uma Certa Lucrécia	Lucrécia	
1957	Absolutamente Certo	Bela	
1957	A Baronesa Transviada	Gonçalina / The Baroness	
1958	Cala a Boca, Etelvina	Etelvina	
1958	A Grande Vedete	Janete	
1959	Entrei de Gaiato	Ananásia da Emancipação / Singer in musical number	
1960	Dona Violante Miranda	Violante Miranda	
1960	Só Naquela Base		
1960	Minervina Vem Aí	Minervina	
1960	Com Minha Sogra em Paquetá		
1960	A Viúva Valentina	Valentina	
1963	Sonhando com Milhões	Agripina	
1970	Se Meu Dólar Falasse	Bisisica	
1980	Bububu no Bobobó		
1980	Cavalo Amarelo	Dulcinéa	
1980	Dulcinéa Vai à Guerra	Dulcinéa	
1983	O Menino Arco-Íris		
1989	Que Rei Sou Eu?	Baronesa Eknésia	
1992	Deus nos Acuda	Celestina	
1993	Oceano Atlantis		
1996	Sai de Baixo	Leopoldina	
2008	Nossa Vida Não Cabe Num Opala	Vovó no Opala	(final film role)
