= O Descobrimento do Brasil (film) =

1936 film directed by Humberto Mauro

- Directed by: Humberto Mauro
- Screenplay by: Bandeira Duarte, Humberto Mauro
- Story by: Affonso de Taunay
- Produced by: Alberto Campiglia
- Cinematography: Alberto Botelho, Alberto Campiglia, Humberto Mauro, Manoel Ribeiro
- Edited by: Alberto Botelho
- Music by: Heitor Villa-Lobos
- Release date: 1936
- Running time: 60 minutes
- Country: Brazil
- Language: Portuguese

O Descobrimento do Brasil

O Descobrimento do Brasil is a 1936 Brazilian adventure film directed by Humberto Mauro and starring Alvaro Costa, João de Deus, and Manoel Rocha.

== Cast ==
- Alvaro Costa as Pedro Álvares Cabral
- João de Deus as Ayres Correa
- Manoel Rocha as Pero Vaz Caminha
- Alfredo Silva as Henrique de Coimbra
- De Los Rios as Duarte Pacheco
- Arthur Oliveira as Pedro Escobar
- J. Silveira as Alfredo Cunha
- Hélio Barroso as Edgar
- Armando Duval as Nicolau Coelho / Bartolomeu Dias
