= Lábios sem Beijos =

1930 film

Virgin Lips
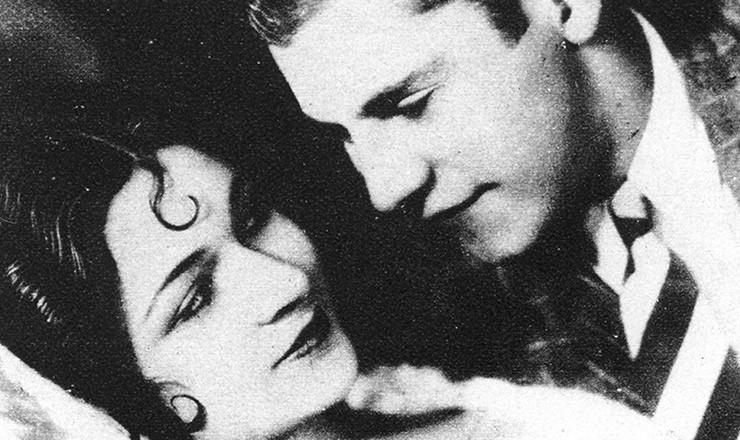
- Film still
- Directed by: Humberto Mauro
- Written by: Adhemar Gonzaga; Arlindo Muccilo
- Produced by: Cinédia
- Starring: Lelita Rosa; Paulo Morano; Didi Viana
- Production company: Cinédia
- Distributed by: Paramount Pictures (Brazil)
- Release date: November 10, 1930 (Rio de Janeiro)
- Running time: 59 min.
- Country: Brazil
- Language: Silent (Portuguese intertitles)

The film Lábios sem Beijos

Lábios sem Beijos (English: Virgin Lips or Lips without Kisses) is a Brazilian silent romantic comedy film directed by Humberto Mauro who was also the cinematographer, and produced in 1930 by Cinédia at the end of the silent film era. It was Written by Adhemar Gonzaga and Arlindo Muccilo with Lelita Rosa, Paulo Morano, and Didi Viana in the main cast.

== Plot summary ==
Lelita, a young woman from a wealthy family who is courted by her cousin Paul, but she has reason to believe that he is also having an affair with Lelita's sister, which causes problems of jealousy, until everything becomes clear and true love prevails.

== Cast ==
- Lelita Rosa as Lelita
- Paulo Morano as Paulo
- Didi Viana as Didi
- Gina Cavalieri as Gina
- Augusta Guimarães as Perpétua
- Alfredo Rosário as Rosário
- Tamar Moema as Tamar
- Décio Murilo
- Máximo Serrano
- Carlos Eugênio
- Adhemar Gonzaga
- Antonio Paes Gonçalves
- Martins Kito
- Fernando Lima
- Leda Léa
- Luiz Gonzaga Martins
- Humberto Mauro
- Celso Montenegro

== Production ==
In an interview with the Brazilian magazine A Ordem during the period prior to the film's release, Gonzaga stated:

"My company was founded to build true Brazilian cinema. It was launched exclusively with our effort and our capitals. Let us show that we can create a new and legitimate art, capable of turning the smile of the pessimists into a cry of enthusiasm. "

At the time it was released, each state in Brazil enforced its own censorship standards, resulting in different cuts to scenes.

== Reception ==
The first film from Cinédia, it is regarded as among Mauro's most significant films, and a classic of Brazilian silent film. It has been described as "a landmark in Brazilian comic film... a biting take on daily life, an ironic vision ... that still makes us laugh today". Some contemporary critics objected to its sensual imagery.

It won the 1930 Journal do Brasil award for Best Brazilian Film.
