= Malvina Tavares =

Brazilian anarchist (1866-1939)

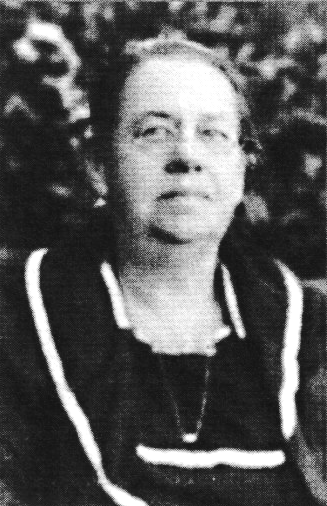
Malvina Tavares

Júlia Malvina Hailliot Tavares (or Malvina Tavares; Encruzilhada do Sul, 24 November 1866 — Cruzeiro do Sul, Rio Grande do Sul, 16 October 1939) was one of the most active Brazilian militant anarchists, as well as a poet and a pioneer of modern education in southern Brazil. She was responsible for the creation of a secular school, the "Modern School of Francisco Ferrer", in the municipality of São Gabriel do Lajeado, which educated generations of libertarians.

== Biography ==
Tavares was the daughter of François de Lalemode Hailliot and Henriette Souleaux Hailliot, immigrant Frenchmen who came to Brazil in the mid-19th century. In her diary, she refers to the fact that her mother was born in a castle in Bordeaux implying a possible aristocratic origin of her mother's family. In the late 1880s, Tavares was sent to the Brazilian capital to study teaching at the Normal School of Porto Alegre. She studied with another future libertarian pedagogue Ana Amaral Lisboa Aurora. In 1890, she married the Portuguese trader, José Joaquim Tavares. In 1898, Tavares and her husband moved to Encruzilhada do Sul, and two years later, they moved to São Gabriel da Estrela.

Despite adversity, Tavares persisted in her role as a teacher, taking herself with educating rural children. As a teacher, she abolished corporal punishment to learners, very common at the time, and went on to innovate in educational methods, abolishing religious education, and adopting revolutionary proposals by the anarchist Catalan educator, Francesc Ferrer i Guàrdia. Her students Nino Martins, Cecilio Vilar and Espertirina Martins became libertarian activists.

== Bibliography ==
- carlos gilberto Pereira Dias. 2008. Costurando vidas: Os itinerários de Ana Aurora do Amaral Lisboa (1860-1951) e Júlia Malvina Hailliot Tavares (1866-1939). Florianópolis: Fazendo Gênero (in Portuguese)
- joão batista Marçal. 1995. Os Anarquistas no Rio Grande do Sul. Porto Alegre: UE. p. 207 (in Portuguese)
- flávio Tavares. 1999. Memórias do Esquecimento. São Paulo: Globo. p. 302 (in Portuguese)
