= Lídia Mattos =

Brazilian actress

Lídia Mattos (10 October 1924 – 22 January 2013) was a Brazilian actress whose career spanned radio, theater, television and film.

Mattos was born in Rio de Janeiro in 1924. She had four children with her husband, actor Urbano Lóes. She made her film debut in the 1939 Brazilian movie, Aves Sem Ninho, directed by Raul Roulien. She appeared in numerous films throughout the 1940s and 1950s, including Ruy Costa's Pega Ladrão in 1940; Moacyr Fenelon's Gente Honesta in 1944; Mãos Sangrentas, directed by Carlos Hugo Christensen in 1955; and Eurípedes Ramos's O Diamante in 1956. She continued to be cast in film roles during the 1970s and 1980s as well.

In 2000, Mattos was awarded as Best Supporting Actress in the Gramado Film Festival by the role of Letícia in the Florinda Bolkan's film, Eu Não Conhecia Tururu.

== Death ==
Mattos died on 22 January 2013 from pneumonia at the Espanhol Hospital in Rio de Janeiro, where she had been hospitalized since 25 December 2012, at the age of 88. She was buried in the São João Batista cemetery in Botafogo. Mattos was survived by her four children; seven grandchildren and three great-grandchildren.

== Filmography ==
Year	Title	Role	Notes
1939	Aves Sem Ninho	Lídia	
1940	Pega Ladrão		
1940	Argila	Marina	
1944	O Segredo das Asas	Maria	
1944	Gente Honesta		
1955	Mãos Sangrentas		
1956	O Diamante		
1971	Quando as Mulheres Paqueram		
1973	Como É Boa Nossa Empregada		(segment "Lula e a copeira")
1974	Essa Gostosa Brincadeira a Dois	Beth's mother	
1976	O Pai do Povo		
1976	Tangarela, a Tanga de Cristal		
1977	O Seminarista		
1978	Os Sensuais - Crônica de Uma Família Pequeno-Burguesa	Edith	
1979	O Coronel e o Lobisomem		
1987	A Menina do Lado		
1988	Dedé Mamata	Violeta	
1995	A Próxima Vítima	Diva	TV series
2000	Eu Não Conhecia Tururu	Leticia	
