= Parambu =

Municipality in Ceará, Brazil

- Municipality
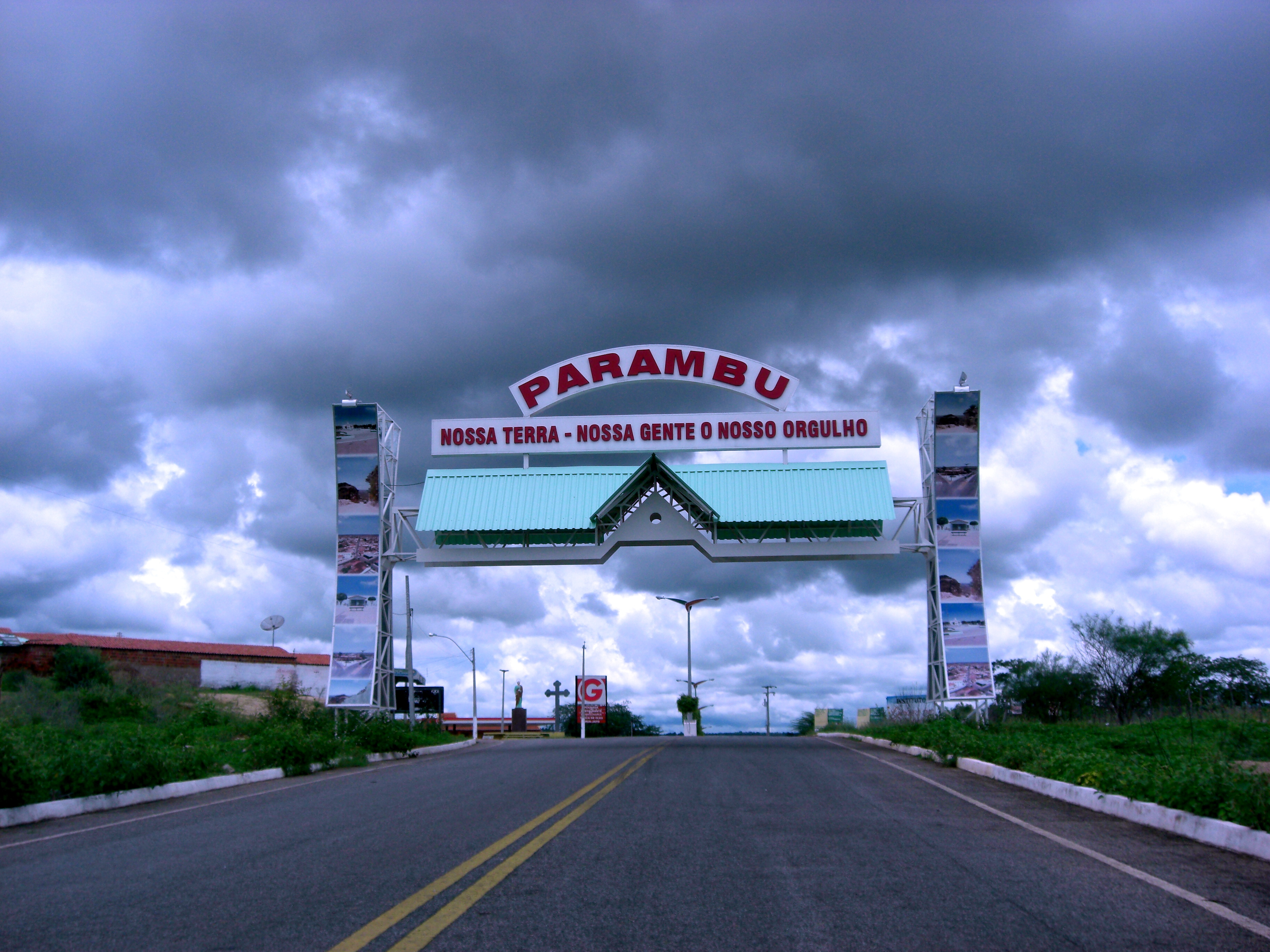

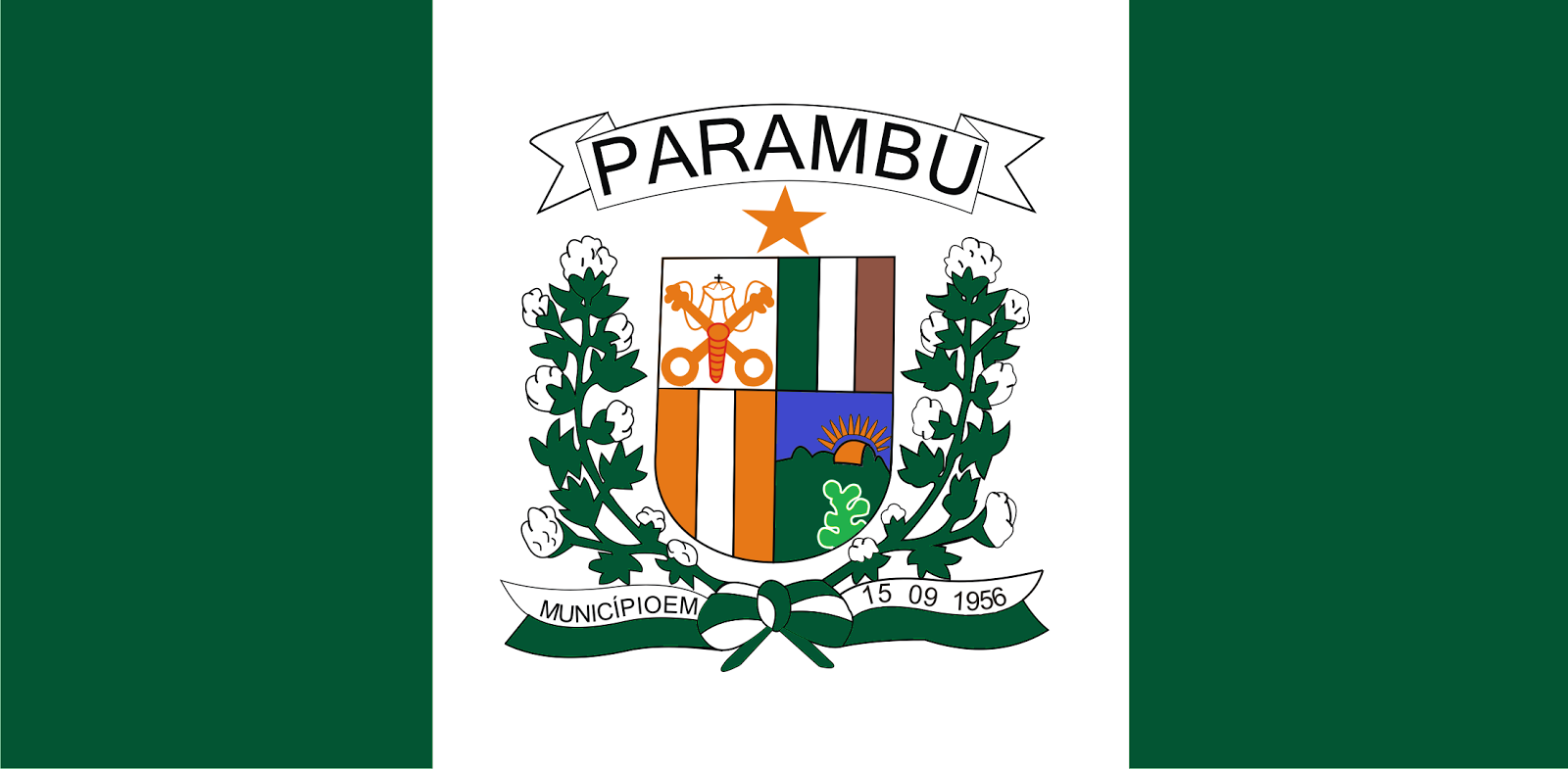
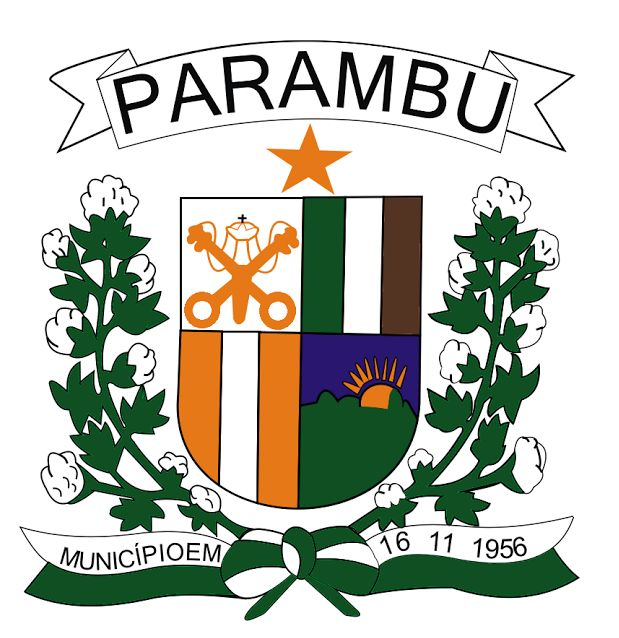
- Flag Coat of arms
- Interactive map of Parambu
- Coordinates: 6°12′49″S 40°41′47″W
- Country: Brazil
- Region: Nordeste
- State: Ceará
- Mesoregion: Sertoes Cearenses

Population (2020)
  - Total: 31,455
- Time zone: UTC−3 (BRT)

Parambu, Ceará (Brazilian Portuguese: [paɾɐ̃ˈbu]) is a municipality in the state of Ceará in the Northeast region of Brazil.

== See also ==
- List of municipalities in Ceará
