= William Hadfield =

British writer

William Hadfield (1806–1887) was a British author, best known for his writing about Brazil.

== Life ==
Hadfield entered commercial life in South America at a very early age and spent some of the most important years of his life there. He was the first secretary of the Buenos Aires Great Southern Railway, secretary to the South American General Steam Navigation Company, and both by literary and commercial effort did much to open up South America to British enterprise and capital. This was without pecuniary benefit to himself, as in 1847, in consequence of an execution levied on his goods, he was driven to bankruptcy. In 1863, Hadfield founded in London The South American Journal and Brazil and River Plate Mail (the first number was published 7 November), of which he was chief editor till his death, on 14 August 1887. He was buried at St. Peter's, Walthamstow, beside his wife, who had predeceased him.

== Writings ==
Hadfield was the author of Brazil, the River Plate, and the Falkland Islands, with the Cape Horn Route to Australia (1854) and Brazil and the River Plate in 1868, their Progress since 1853 (1869), both available in several reprint editions. He also edited Brazil. Stray Notes from Bahia (1860) by Vice Consul James Wetherell, who served at Bahia from 1843 to 1857.
