= National Council for Energy Policy =

The Brazilian National Council of Energy Policy (CNPE, Portuguese: Conselho Nacional de Política Energética) was created by the law no. 9.478/1997, also known as Petroleum Law. The council is the governmental organization of Brazil responsible for advising the Presidency of the Republic and has the objective of elaborating policies for the electric sector of the country.

CNPE is formed by state government representatives, experts in energy, non-governmental organizations and seven ministers.
