= Felicidades =

Felicidades may refer to:

- Merry Christmas (2000 film) (Felicidades), a 2000 Argentine-Italian comedy drama film
- Felicidades (album), a 1979 album by Menudo
