= Cinearte =

Former Brazilian entertainment periodical

- Categories: Cinema; Culture
- Frequency: Weekly
- Publisher: Sociedade Anônima O Malho, Editora Pimenta de Mello
- Founder: Mário Behring; Adhemar Gonzaga
- First issue: March 3, 1926
- Final issue: July 1942
- Country: Brazil
- Based in: Rio de Janeiro
- Language: Portuguese

Cinearte was a Brazilian magazine about cinema, which was founded in Rio de Janeiro on March 3, 1926. Its founders were Mario Behring and Adhemar Gonzaga.

Cinearte was published on a weekly basis. The magazine first attempted to lay a bridge between Brazilian cinema and North American cinema. However, it later focused on national cinema. The magazine ceased publication in July 1942.
