= Zé Laviola =

Brazilian politician (born 1993)

Member of the Legislative Assembly of Minas Gerais
- Incumbent
- Assumed office 1 February 2023

Personal details
- Born: 10 December 1993 (age 32)
- Party: New Party
- Parent: Celise Laviola (mother)
- Relatives: José Laviola Matos (grandfather); José Henrique Lisboa Rosa (uncle)

José Laviola Neto de Lira (born 10 December 1993), better known as Zé Laviola, is a Brazilian politician serving as a member of the Legislative Assembly of Minas Gerais since 2023. He is the son of Celise Laviola, the grandson of José Laviola Matos, and the nephew of José Henrique Lisboa Rosa.
