= Adair Cardoso =

Brazilian singer and composer

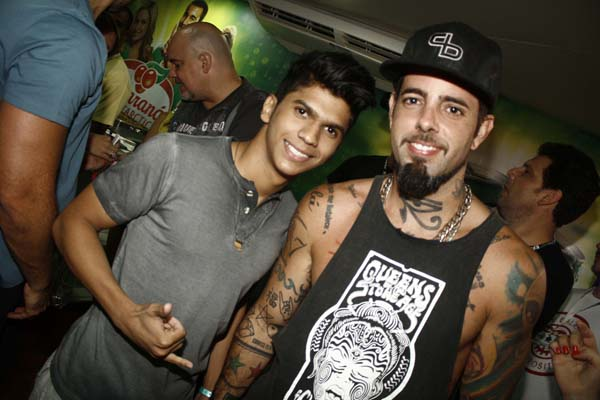

Background information
- Born: Adair Cardoso; June 27, 1993 (age 33); Tangará da Serra, Mato Grosso, Brazil
- Genres: Alternative rock, pop rock, sertanejo, Música popular brasileira
- Occupations: Singer, composer
- Instruments: Vocals, piano, guitar,
- Years active: 1995–present
- Label: Som Livre
- Website: www.adaircardoso.com.br

Adair Cardoso (born June 27, 1993) is a Brazilian singer and composer of sertanejo music. His first success was the song "Que se Dane o Mundo", which was the theme of the 18th season of the TV series Brazilian Malhação.

== Biography ==
Cardoso was born in Tangará da Serra, and began his career when he was a child. His father noticed his son could easily play musical instruments, such as the accordion. He almost single-handedly learned to play several instruments. At 6 years old, Cardoso began to sing songs he heard on the TV and radio.

At 8 years old, his father's management introduced him to Wagner Tadeu Paula, the manager of sertanejo duo Gino e Geno.

At 11 years old, Adair went on a television show, Raul Gil, where his work became recognized nationally and internationally.

At 13 years old, Adair released his first studio album, Coração Adolescente in February 2007.

== Discography ==
- Coração Adolescente (2007)
- Coração de Quem Ama (2009)
- Adair Cardoso – Ao Vivo (2010)

== Singles ==
- "Coração Adolescente" (2007)
- "Coração de Quem Ama" (2008)
- "Chora Coração" (2010)
- "Que se Dane o Mundo" (2010)
- "Enamorado" Participação de Claudia Leitte (2012)
