= Laura Suarez (singer) =

Brazilian singer and actress

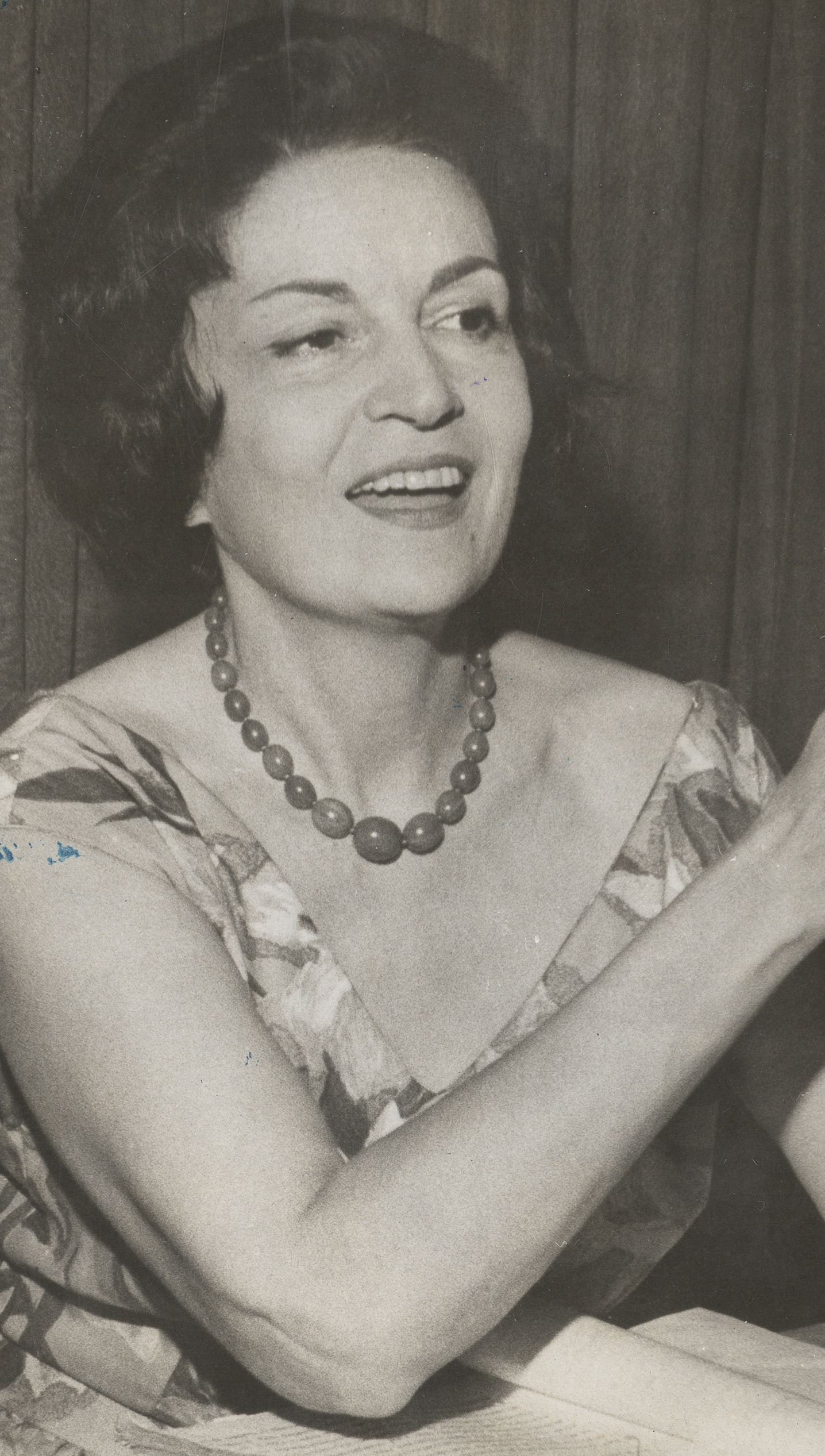
- Laura Suarez in 1952
- Born: 21 November 1909; Rio de Janeiro, Brazil
- Died: 1990 (aged 80–81); Rio de Janeiro, Brazil
- Occupations: Actress, singer
- Years active: 1940–1967 (film)

Laura Suarez (1909–1990) was a Brazilian singer and film actress. She appeared in twelve films including Samba in Berlin (1944), but much of her work involved performing on the radio or in nightclubs.

== Selected filmography ==
- Samba in Berlin (1944)
- Carnival of Crime (1962)

== Bibliography ==
- Flórido, Eduardo Giffoni. Great characters in the history of Brazilian cinema. Fraiha, 1999.
