= Jessicão =

Brazilian politician (born 1993)

Member of the Legislative Assembly of Paraná
- Incumbent
- Assumed office 1 February 2027

Personal details
- Born: 3 February 1993 (age 33)
- Party: Liberal Party

Jessica Ramos Moreno (born 3 February 1993), better known as Jessicão, is a Brazilian politician who was elected member of the Legislative Assembly of Paraná in 2026, the most voted women for state deputy of Paraná. She has been a municipal councillor of Londrina since 2021.

== Personal life ==
Jessicão is lesbian, and defends Christian politics.
