= Maximira Figueiredo =

Brazilian actress (1939–2018)

- Born: 2 February 1939; São Paulo, São Paulo
- Died: 15 October 2018 (aged 79); Praia Grande, São Paulo
- Occupation: Actress
- Children: 1

Maximira Figueiredo (2 February 1939 – 15 October 2018) was a Brazilian actress. She was known for having voiced the character Rosie in the Brazilian dubbing version of The Jetsons cartoon.

== Filmography ==
=== Film ===
Year	Title	Role	Notes
1962	O Vendedor de Linguiças	Flora	
1962	Lá no Meu Sertão		
2018	A Vingança de Babu		
2018	A Cruz e o Pentagrama	Irene	

=== Television ===
Year	Title	Role	Notes
1956	Neli	Neli	
1959	O Guarani	Isabel	
1965	Marina	Marina	
1965	Cadeia de Cristal		
1965	Zás Trás	Fada	
1980	Cavalo Amarelo	Do Carmo	
1988	Chapadão do Bugre	Catarina	
1998	Pérola Negra	Rosália Pacheco Oliveira	194 episodes
1998	Fascinação	Cigana	
1999	Ô... Coitado!	Dona Malvina	
2001	Amor e Ódio	Martinha	
