= João de Deus (actor) =

Portuguese actor

João de Deus in 1908

João de Deus Seta (1883–1951), also called João de Deus, was a Portuguese actor who worked mainly in Brazilian films.

== Biography ==
Born in Trás os Montes, Portugal, he began working as a professional actor for the theatrical company Dias Bragas in Rio de Janeiro. After moving to Arthur Azevedo company, he acted in the Giuseppe Lablanca's 1908 film Os Estranguladores, considered the first Brazilian fiction film. He also acted in revues, later creating his own company in 1918. Subsequently, he acted in Luiz de Barros' films Alma Sertaneja and Ubirajara, and directed O Guarani (1922). In the 1920s, he focused his work on revues, returning to cinema in the 1930s, acting in films like Caçando Feras (1936), O Descobrimento do Brasil (1936), E o Circo Chegou (1940), O Cortiço (1945), and O Malandro e a Grã-fina (1947). He died in 1951.
