= Rodolfo Mayer =

Brazilian actor

- Born: 4 February 1910; São Paulo, Brazil
- Died: 1 January 1985 (aged 74); Rio de Janeiro, Brazil
- Occupation: Actor
- Years active: 1929–1981 (film)

Rodolfo Mayer (February 4, 1910 – January 1, 1985) was a Brazilian actor. He appeared in more than forty films and television series during his career.

== Selected filmography ==
- Minas Conspiracy (1948)
- Leonora of the Seven Seas (1955)

== Bibliography ==
- Flórido, Eduardo Giffoni. Great characters in the history of Brazilian cinema. Fraiha, 1999.
