= Samba in Berlin =

1943 film directed by Luiz de Barros

- Theatrical release poster
- Directed by: Luiz de Barros
- Written by: Luiz de Barros; Adhemar Gonzaga
- Produced by: Adhemar Gonzaga
- Starring: Mesquitinha; Laura Suarez; Dercy Gonçalves; Léo Albano
- Cinematography: Afrodísio de Castro; George Fanto
- Edited by: Luiz de Barros; Wilson Costa
- Production company: Cinédia
- Distributed by: Cinédia
- Release date: 22 February 1943
- Running time: 85 minutes
- Country: Brazil
- Language: Portuguese

Samba in Berlin (Portuguese: Samba em Berlim) is a 1943 Brazilian musical comedy film directed by Luiz de Barros and starring Mesquitinha, Laura Suarez and Dercy Gonçalves. It is a World War II film part of the popular tradition of chanchadas, aiming to poke fun at Nazi Germany with whom Brazil was now at war.

== Cast ==
- Mesquitinha
- Laura Suarez
- Dercy Gonçalves
- Léo Albano
- Brandão Filho
- Manoel Rocha
- Grande Otelo
- Jesus Ruas
- Zbigniew Ziembinski
- Grijo Sobrinho
- Matilde Costa
- Túlio Berti

== Bibliography ==
- Dennison, Stephanie & Shaw, Lisa. Popular Cinema in Brazil. Manchester University Press, 2004.
