= Humberto Mauro =

Brazilian director

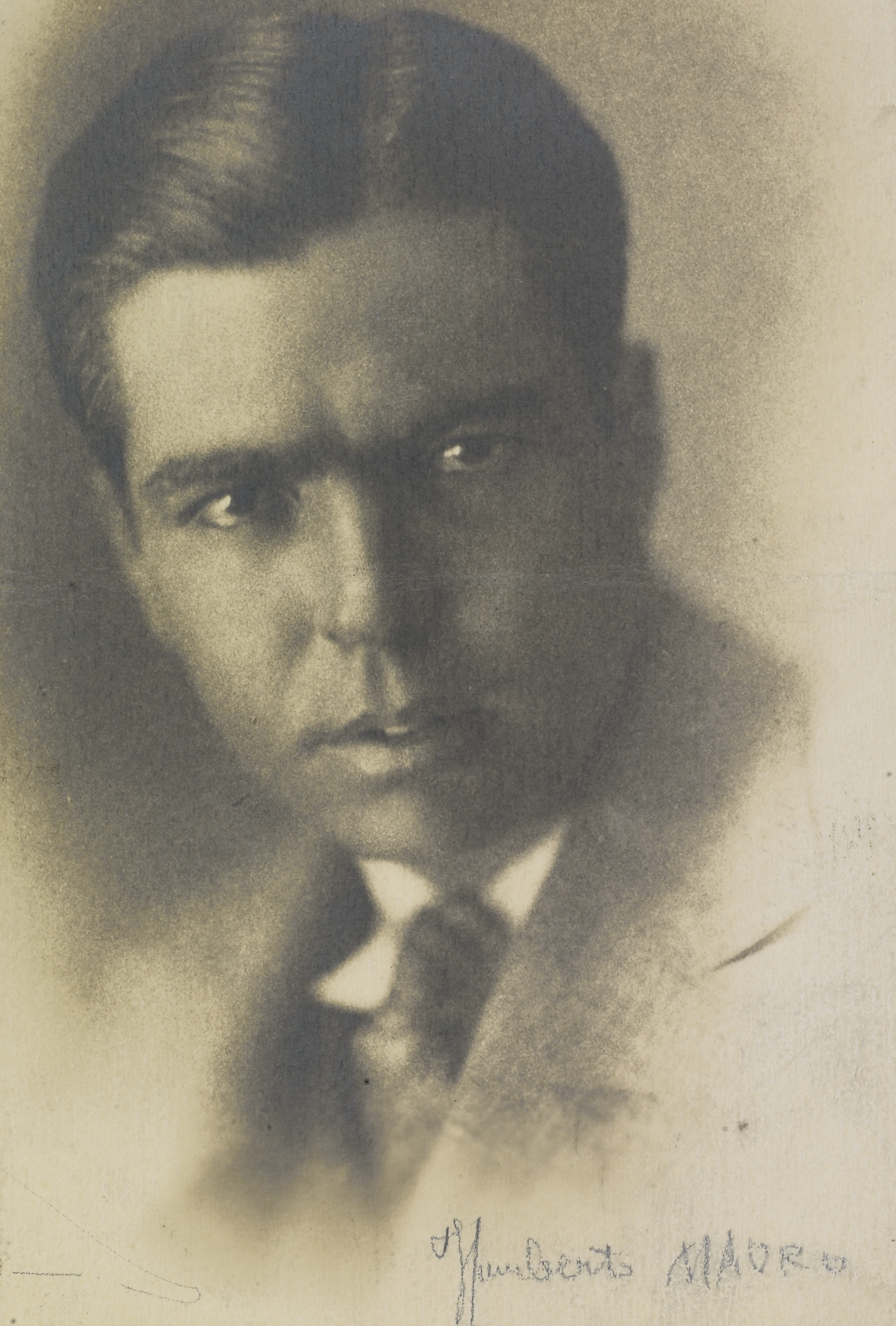
- Born: 30 April 1897; Volta Grande, Minas Gerais, Brazil
- Died: 5 November 1983 (aged 86); Volta Grande
- Occupations: film director, screenwriter, cinematographer
- Spouse(s): Dona Bebê (Maria Vilela de Almeida, Lola Lys)

Humberto Duarte Mauro (30 April 1897 – 5 November 1983) was a Brazilian film director. His best known work is Ganga Bruta. He is often considered the greatest director of early Brazilian cinema.

== Career ==
Mauro's second feature film Thesouro Perdido (Lost Treasure) won the Brazilian "Film of the Year" award in 1927. Later that year, Phebo Sul America Film was reorganized into Phebo Brasil Film. The first film released under the new Phebo was Braza Dormida (Sleeping Ember). Braza Dormida was a boxoffice success and furthered Mauro's career as one of Brazil's leading directors.

In July 1929, Mauro's final film for Phebo Brasil Film, Sangue Mineiro (Blood of Minas Gerais), was shown in Cataguases. In 1930, the film was given a nationwide release. The film was critically and popularly acclaimed. This was the first film in which Mauro worked with Carmen Santos who would star in many of Mauro's later films.

Phebo Brasil Film did not have the resources to continue to produce films. Adhemar Gonzaga offered Mauro a directing job for Cinédia, which was centered in Rio de Janeiro. Gonzaga had started to shoot Lábios sem Beijos (Lips Without Kisses) which starred Carmen Santos. However, Carmen became pregnant was unable to finish production. Gonzaga handed the project over to Mauro, who both directed and photographed the film, in March 1930. Mauro decided to make the film silent even though sound was available. He wanted to explore the possibilities of silent film. Upon release in 1930, the film won the Jornal do Brasil film of the year award. Mauro acted as cinematographer for Cinédia's second film Mulher (Woman).

Mauro began shooting Ganga Bruta in September 1931. The film was not completed until 1933 due to cast replacements. The film was silent with synchronized sound recorded on Vitaphone discs added later. The film received little acclaim until two decades after its release.

Mauro co-directed his first talking film with Adhemar Gonzaga. A Voz do Carnaval (The Voice of Carnival) was a musical. Afterwards, Mauro left Cinédia for Brasil Vita Filme in 1934. He directed two feature films and several documentaries for Brasil Vita Filme.

In 1936, Mauro joined the Instituto de Nacional do Cinema Educativo (INCE), which was then the government office for educational and propaganda films. Mauro shot hundreds of documentaries when he was working in INCE, and he also shot his last three movies: Descobrimento do Brasil (The Discovery of Brazil), Argila (Clay), and O Canto da Saudade (The Song of Yearning). His final film was Carro de Bois (Ox Cart), a documentary, in 1974.

== Personal life ==
Mauro married Maria Vilela de Almeida in 1920. They were married until Mauro's death. They had three children. He is the granduncle of actors André Di Mauro and Cláudia Mauro.

== Filmography ==
=== As director ===
- Valadião, o Cratera (1925)
- Na Primavera da Vida (1926)
- Thesouro Perdido (1927)
- Braza Dormida (1929)
- Symphonia de Cataguases (1929)
- Blood of Minas Gerais (1930)
- Lábios sem Beijos (1930)
- Ganga Bruta (1933)
- A Voz do Carnaval (1933)
- Favela dos Meus Amores (1935)
- O Descobrimento do Brasil (1936)
- Cidade Mulher (1936)
- Descobrimento do Brasil (1937)
- Argila (1940)
- O Canto da Saudade (1952)
- Carro de Bois (1974)

=== As actor ===
- O Canto da Saudade (1952)
- Memória de Helena (1969)

=== As screenwriter ===
- Minas Conspiracy (1948)
- Como Era Gostoso o Meu Francês (for the native Tupi language dialogs) (1971)
- Anchieto, José do Brasil (1978)
- A Noiva da Cidade (1979)

=== As cinematographer ===
- Mulher (1931)

== Awards ==
- Jornal do Brasil Film of the Year (1930)

== Trivia ==
Mauro was a member of the jury at the Venice Film Festival in 1938.

== Literature ==
- Paulo Emílio Sales Gomes: Humberto Mauro – Cataguases – cinearte, Editores Perspectiva, São Paulo 1974.
