= Carmen Santos =

Portuguese-born Brazilian actress and film producer

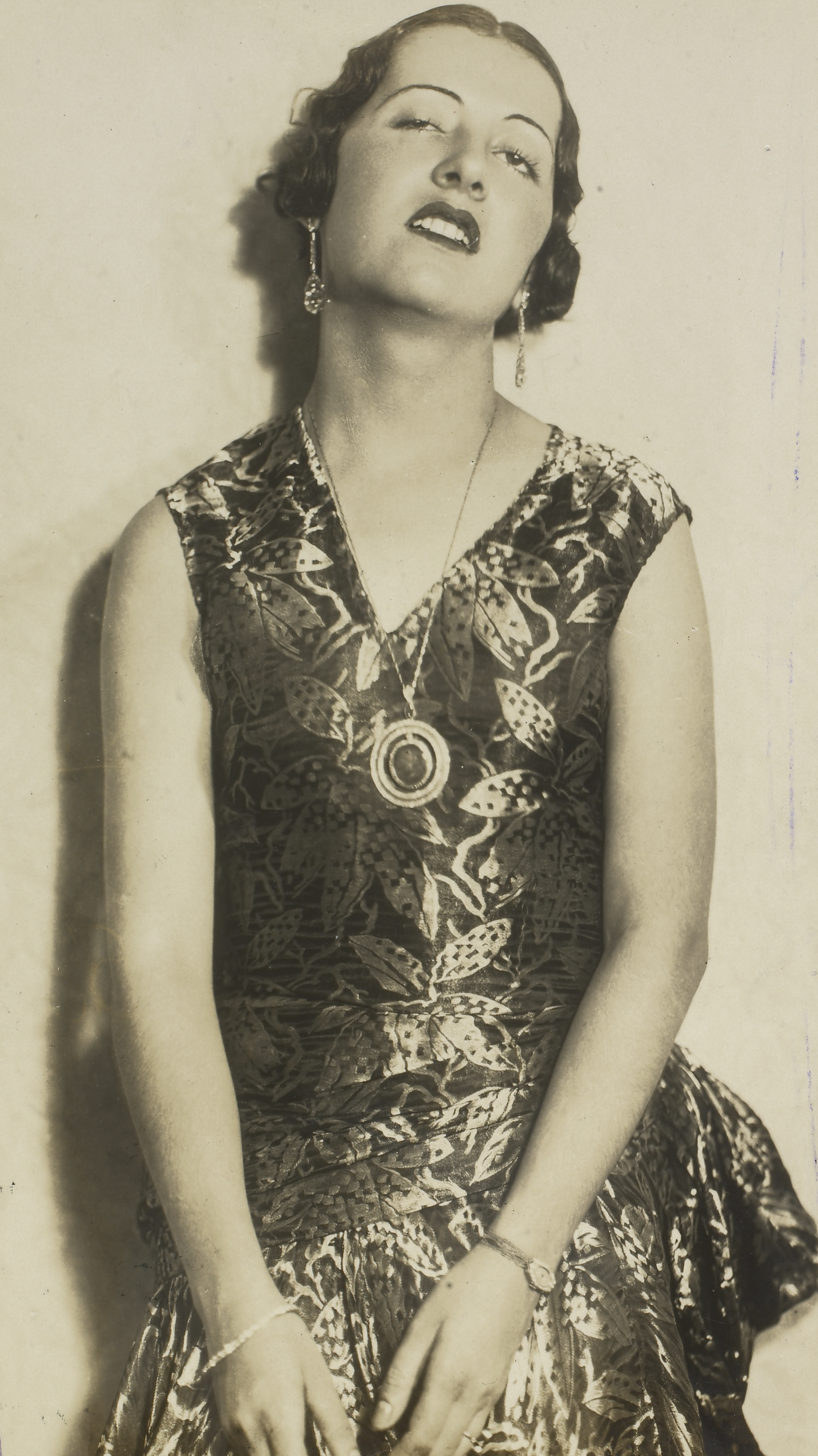
- Santos in Sangue Mineiro
- Born: 8 June 1904; Vila Flor, Portugal
- Died: 24 September 1952 (aged 48); Rio de Janeiro, Brazil
- Other name: Maria do Carmo Santos Gonçalves
- Occupations: Director, Producer, Screenwriter, Actress
- Years active: 1919–1952 (film)

Carmen Santos (8 June 1904 – 24 September 1952) was a Portuguese-born Brazilian actress and film producer. Santos began acting at the age of fifteen, and started producing films from 1930 onwards with Blood of Minas Gerais. She founded her own film studio Brasil Vita Filmes in Rio de Janeiro. Santos directed the 1948 film Minas Conspiracy, in which she also starred.

== Selected filmography ==
- Blood of Minas Gerais (1930)
- Minas Conspiracy (1948)

== Bibliography ==
- Marsh, Leslie. Brazilian Women's Filmmaking: From Dictatorship to Democracy. University of Illinois Press, 2012.
- Shaw, Lisa & Dennison, Stephanie. Brazilian National Cinema. Routledge, 2014.
