= Grande Otelo =

Brazilian actor, comedian, singer and composer

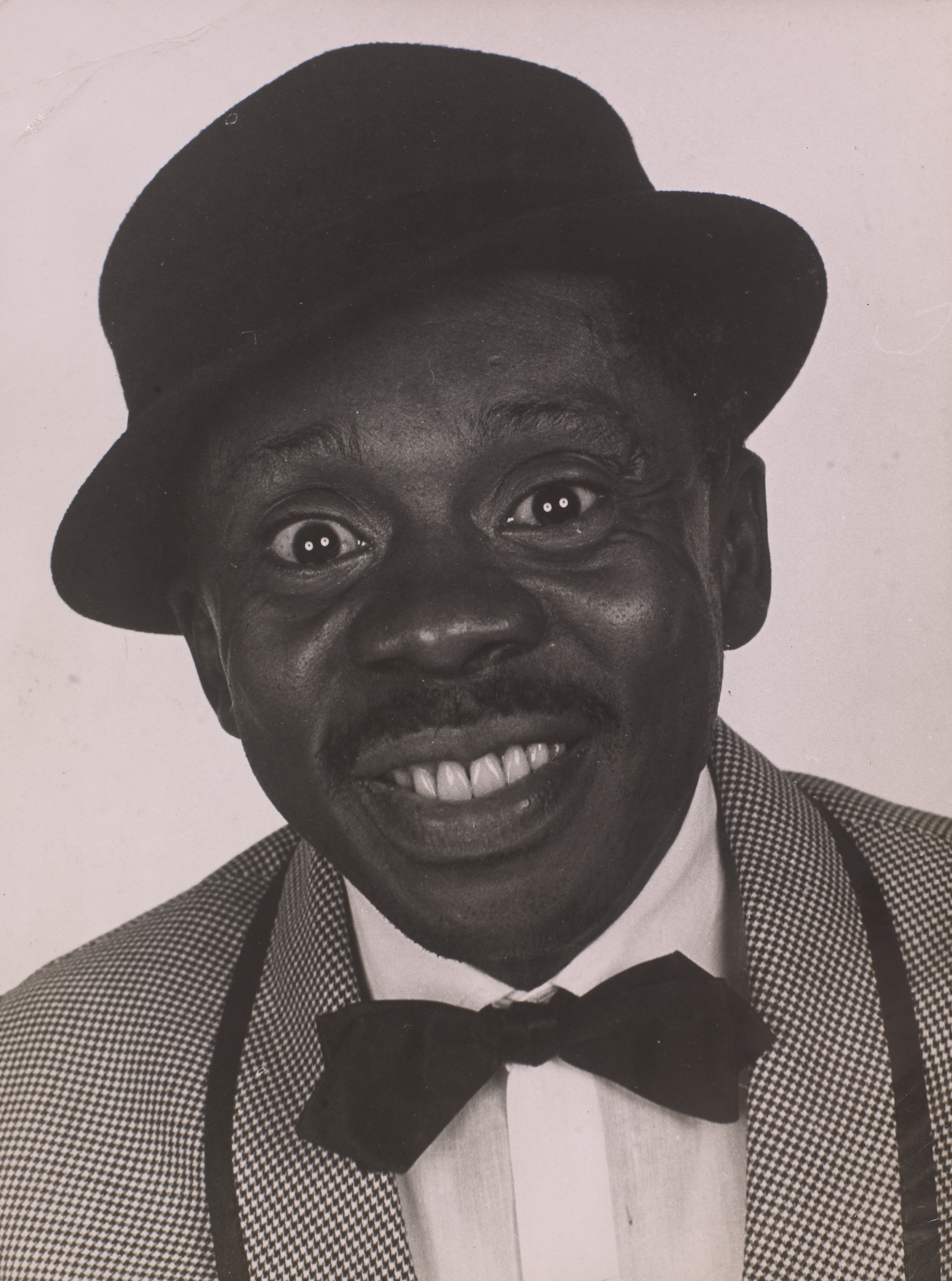
Grande Otelo.

Grande Otelo (October 18, 1915 – November 26, 1993) was the stage name of Brazilian actor, comedian, singer, and composer Sebastião Bernardes de Souza Prata. Otelo was born in Uberlândia, and was orphaned as a child. He kept running away from the families that adopted him; only when he took up art did his life become settled.

Grande Otelo started his film career in 1935 in the movie Noites Cariocas. He was also renowned for the comic duo he formed with Oscarito.

He died, aged 78, in Charles de Gaulle Airport near Paris and was buried in São Pedro cemetery in Uberlândia, Brazil.

Grande Otelo is depicted in the 2023 biographical documentary film Othelo, o Grande, by Lucas H. Rossi dos Santos.

== Biography ==
=== 1920: Childhood and youth ===
Otelo was the son of Antenor Prata and Maria das Dores de Souza. His father, who was a cowboy, died when Sebastião was only two years old. According to the actor himself, his career in acting began a few short years after in UIberlândia in 1924 in a circus ring:

"To me, the first entry that I made was beautiful because I was already a city clown, with my young age. Therefore, in that day the circus was full to see Bastiãozinho (...). I was about seven years old...Bastiãozinho dressed in a long dress and a pillow on the butt, wiggling arm in arm with the clown. Everyone laughed, everyone found it funny..."

When the young boy was eight years old, his mother gave him up for adoption and he was taken to São Paulo . In the city, he fled from his adopted family a few times, which always led him to the juvenile court. In 1927, though still a child, he participated in the Companhia Negra de Revistas which was funded by Jayme Silva and the black artist De Chocolat who also had had Pixinguinha as a conductor. His presentations quickly became well known, leading to the following quote from the Jornal do Commercio:

"As part of the cast as a great attraction the great Othelo, a little six year old artist, is a real astonishment. The great little artist sings in diverse languages, with a verve and an extraordinary spontaneity. Newspapers of São Paulo and many other cities have called him the greatest artist of the Portuguese language."

After a few escape attempts, he passed from tutor to tutor until being adopted by the family of the politician Antonio de Queiroz. Otelo then studied at the Heart of Jesus Lyceum until he was in junior high.

=== Personal life ===
His life was full of a variety of tragedies. His father died from a stabbing before Grande Otelo was born and his mother was an alcoholic. In 1948, he officially married his first wife, Lucia Maria Pinheiro. The following year, Pinheiro shot and murdered her six-year-old child - Otelo's stepson - and then killed herself. In 1954, Otelo married for a second time, this time to Olga Vasconcellos. He remained in a relationship with her for 20 years. His final marriage was to a dancer named Joséphine Hélène, which lasted 13 years.

Otelo had four children, one of whom also became an actor: José Prata ("O Pratinha"), who started his career at 14. He appeared as Bentinho in the 1986 version of the soap opera Sinhá Moça, and also appeared in the sitcom As Aventuras do Tio Maneco and in the plays O Pagador de Promessas and A Turma do Pererê. In the 2010s, Pratinha worked as a cellphone repairman. Another of Otelo's children, Carlos Sebastião Vasconcelos Prata, had become homeless around the same time.

=== Effects of racism on his career ===
Grande Otelo is seen by many as a great success story. He is widely known today because of the prolific nature of his acting career. However, his career was marked by racism and prejudice. In one of his first roles, that of Sebastião in the film Onde Estás Felicidade, Grande Otelo's character is subject to many racial stereotypes. Incorrect stereotypes were a theme in many of his works, even well into his later years. Additionally, Grande Otelo faced prejudice against his acting abilities. It was and still is difficult to obtain leading roles for black actors. The leading roles that he managed to secure were all shared with a white co-star.

== Selected filmography ==
- Noites Cariocas (1936)
- João Ninguém (1936)
- Onde Estás Felicidade? (1939) - Sebastião
- Futebol em Família (1939) - Gibi
- Laranja da China (1940) - Boneco de Piche
- Pega Ladrão (1940)
- Céu azul (1941) - Chocolate
- A Sedução do Garimpo (1941)
- Samba in Berlin (1943)
- Caminho do Céu (1943)
- Tristezas Não Pagam Dívidas (1943)
- Moleque Tião (1943) - Tião
- Berlin to the Samba Beat (1944)
- Romance Proibido (1944) - Molecote
- Não Adianta Chorar (1945)
- O Gol da Vitória (1945) - Laurindo
- Segura Esta Mulher (1946) - Olho Vivo
- Fantasma Por Acaso (1946)
- Luz dos Meus Olhos (1947)
- Este Mundo É um Pandeiro (1947)
- Terra Violenta (1948)
- E o Mundo se Diverte (1948)
- É com Este Que Eu Vou (1948) - Lamparina
- Também Somos Irmãos (1949) - Moleque Miro
- O Caçula do Barulho (1949)
- Carnaval no Fogo (1949)
- Não É Nada Disso (1950)
- Aviso aos navegantes (1950) - Azulão
- Três Vagabundos (1952) - Rapadura / Milk Shake
- Barnabé Tu És Meu (1952) - Abdula
- Amei um Bicheiro (1953) - Passarinho
- The Terrible Twosome (1953) - Tião
- Nem Sansão Nem Dalila (1954)
- Matar ou Correr (1954) - Ciscocada
- Malandros em Quarta Dimensão (1954)
- Paixão nas Selvas (1955)
- Depois Eu Conto (1956) - Veludo
- De Pernas Pro Ar (1956) - Faísca
- Com Jeito Vai (1957) - Feijão
- Rio, Zona Norte (1957) - Espírito da Luz
- Pé na Tábua (1957) - Cabeleira
- Metido a Bacana (1957) - Coalhada
- A Baronesa Transviada (1957) - Benedito
- E o Bicho Não Deu (1958) - Jujuba
- É de Chuá (1958) - Laurindo
- Mulher de Fogo (1959)
- Pistoleiro Bossa Nova (1959) - Bartolomeu
- Os três Cangaceiros (1959)
- Mulheres à Vista (1959) - Josafá
- Garota Enxuta (1959) - Otelo
- Entrei de Gaiato (1959) - Himself / Singer in musical number
- Vai que É Mole (1960) - Brancura
- Um Candango na Belacap (1961) - Emanuel Davis Júnior
- O Homem Que Roubou a Copa do Mundo (1961)
- O Dono da Bola (1961) - Himself
- O Assalto ao Trem Pagador (1962) - Cachaça
- Os Cosmonautas (1962) - Zenóbio
- Quero Essa Mulher Assim Mesmo (1963)
- Samba (1965) - Freitas
- Crônica da Cidade Amada (1965) - (segment "Um Pobre Morreu")
- Em Ritmo Jovem (1966)
- Una rosa per tutti (1967)
- Arrastão (1967) - Focinho
- Os Marginais (1968) - (segment "Papo Amarelo")
- Massacre no Supermercado (1968) - Ze Gatinho
- Enfim Sós... Com o Outro (1968) - Anael
- A Doce Mulher Amada (1968) - Leo
- Alibi (1969) - Tranviere
- Macunaíma (1969) - Black Macunaíma / Macunaíma's son
- The Heirs (1969) - Américo
- O Donzelo (1970) - The Taxi Driver
- Se Meu Dólar Falasse (1970) - Tisiu
- Não Aperta, Aparício (1970)
- A Família do Barulho (1970)
- O Barão Otelo no Barato dos Bilhões (1971) - João Otelo dos Anzóis Carapuça
- Cassy Jones, o Magnífico Sedutor (1972)
- O Rei do Baralho (1973)
- O Negrinho do Pastoreio (1973) - Negrinho
- A Estrela Sobe (1974) - Himself
- A Transa do Turfe (1975) - Escovador
- Deixa, Amorzinho... Deixa (1975)
- As Aventuras de Um Detetive Português (1975) - Souza
- O Flagrante (1976)
- Os Pastores da Noite (1976) - Artur
- Tem Alguém na Minha Cama (1976)
- Ladrão de Bagdá (1976)
- Carioca Tigre (1976) - Omero
- Lucio Flavio (1977) - Dondinho
- Ouro Sangrento (1977)
- Ladrões de Cinema (1977)
- A Força do Xangô (1977)
- As Aventuras de Robinson Crusoé (1978) - Sexta-Feira
- A Noiva da Cidade (1978)
- A Noite dos Duros (1978)
- Agonia (1978)
- Asa Branca: Um Sonho Brasileiro (1980)
- Fitzcarraldo (1982) - Station master
- O Homem do Pau-Brasil (1982) - Tovalu
- Parahyba Mulher Macho (1983)
- Quilombo (1984) - Babá
- Exu-Piá, Coração de Macunaíma (1986)
- Jubiabá (1986) - Jubiabá
- Nem Tudo é Verdade (1986)
- Running Out of Luck (1987)
- Brasa Adormecida (1987)
- Natal da Portela (1988) - Seu Napoleão
- Jardim de Alah (1988)
- A Paz É Dourada (1989)
- Escolinha do Professor Raimundo (1990, TV Series) - Eustáquio
- Boca de Ouro (1990)
