= Adhemar Gonzaga =

Brazilian actor (1901–1978)

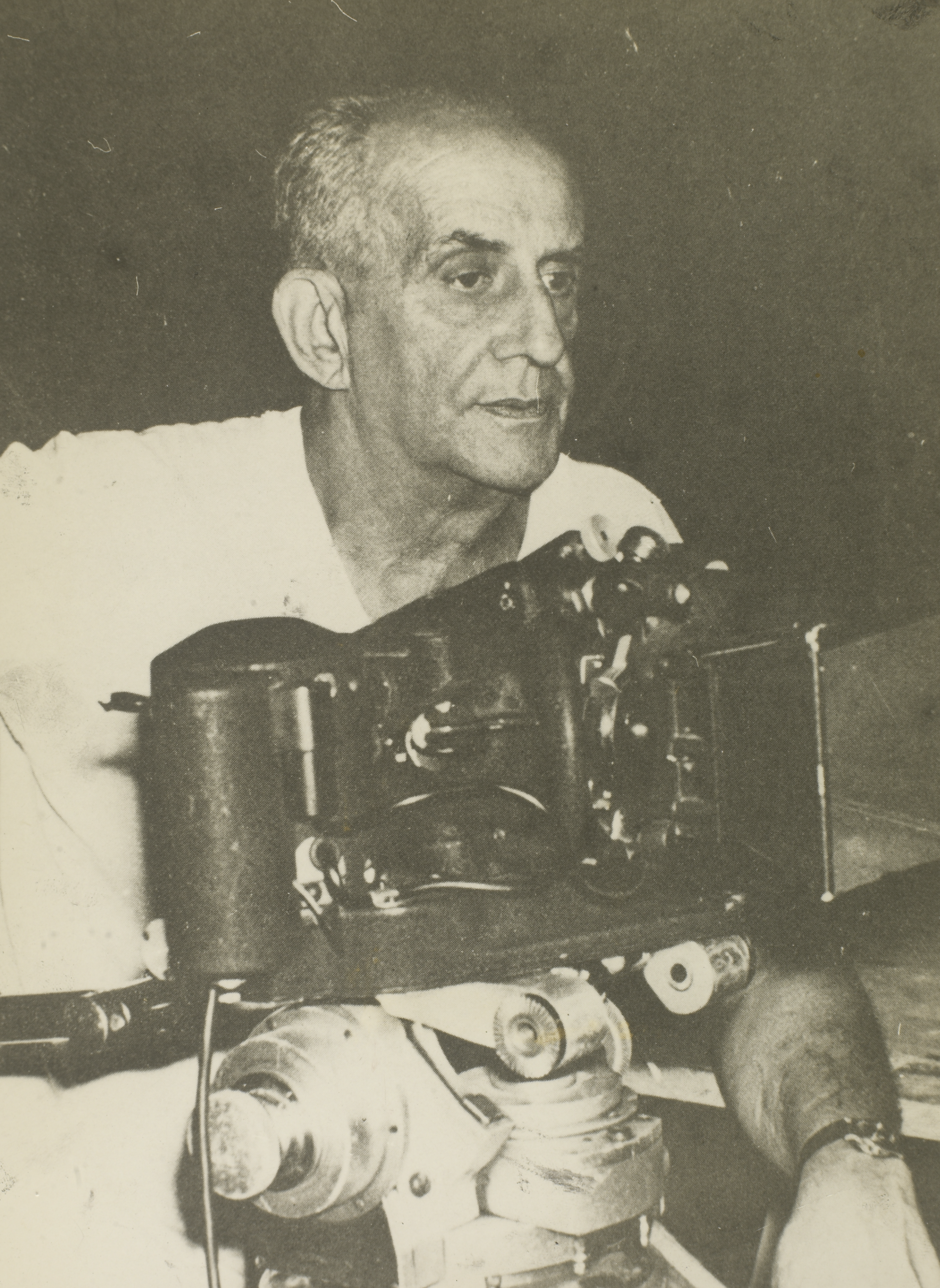
- Gonzaga in 1970
- Born: 26 August 1901; Rio de Janeiro, Brazil
- Died: 29 January 1978 (aged 77); Rio de Janeiro, Brazil
- Occupations: Actor; Director; Producer; Screenwriter; Journalist
- Years active: 1919–1970

Adhemar Gonzaga (26 August 1901 – 29 January 1978) was a Brazilian actor, screenwriter, film producer, and director.

== Biography ==
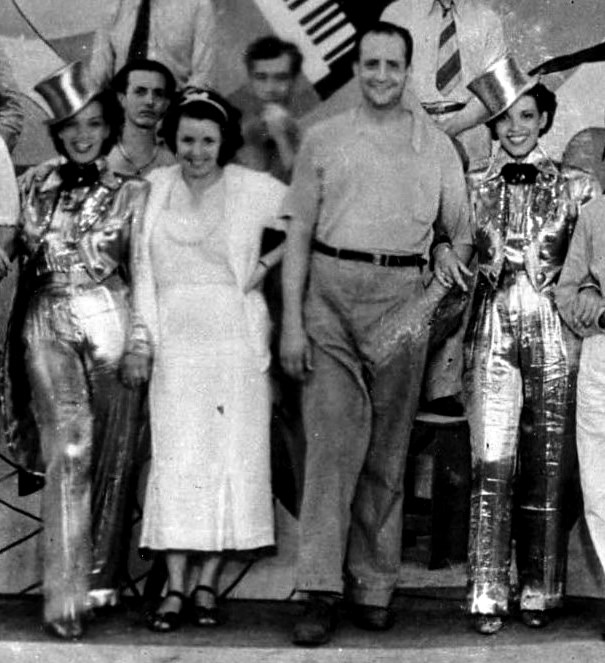
Adhemar Gonzaga (center) with Carmen Miranda (left) and her sister, Aurora Miranda (right)

Born into a wealthy family Gonzaga had a passion for cinema from an early age, and first appeared on screen in a short advertising film in 1920. He worked as a journalist for the film magazine Cinearte (1926–1942) which advocated the creation of a more professional, commercial film industry in Brazil. In 1928, he directed his first film, a silent. The film was a strong commercial success, and on the strength of it Gonzaga persuaded his father to financially back a film studio.

After a period of study in Hollywood, Gonzaga returned to Brazil and founded Cinédia a Rio de Janeiro-based company which quickly became the leading studio in Brazil. Cinédia specialised in producing Chanchadas, musical comedies with a populist appeal which often featured leading stage and singing stars. Chanchadas produced during Gonzaga's reign included Hello, Hello Brazil! (1935), Hello, Hello, Carnival! (1936) and Samba in Berlin (1943). Many of Brazil's major stars appeared in Cinédia productions, including Carmen Miranda. The studio remained in continual operation until 1951.

== Selected filmography ==
=== Producer ===
- Ganga Bruta (1933)
- Hello, Hello Brazil! (1935)
- Onde Estás Felicidade? (1939)
- Samba in Berlin (1943)
- Berlin to the Samba Beat (1944)

=== Director ===
- Barro Humano (1929)
- Hello, Hello, Carnival! (1936)

=== Actor ===
- Blood of Minas Gerais (1930)
- Lábios sem Beijos (1930)

== Bibliography ==
- Shaw, Lisa & Dennison, Stephanie. Brazilian National Cinema. Routledge, 2014. ISBN 978-1-134-70217-6.
