= Mesquitinha =

Portuguese-Brazilian actor, director and comedian

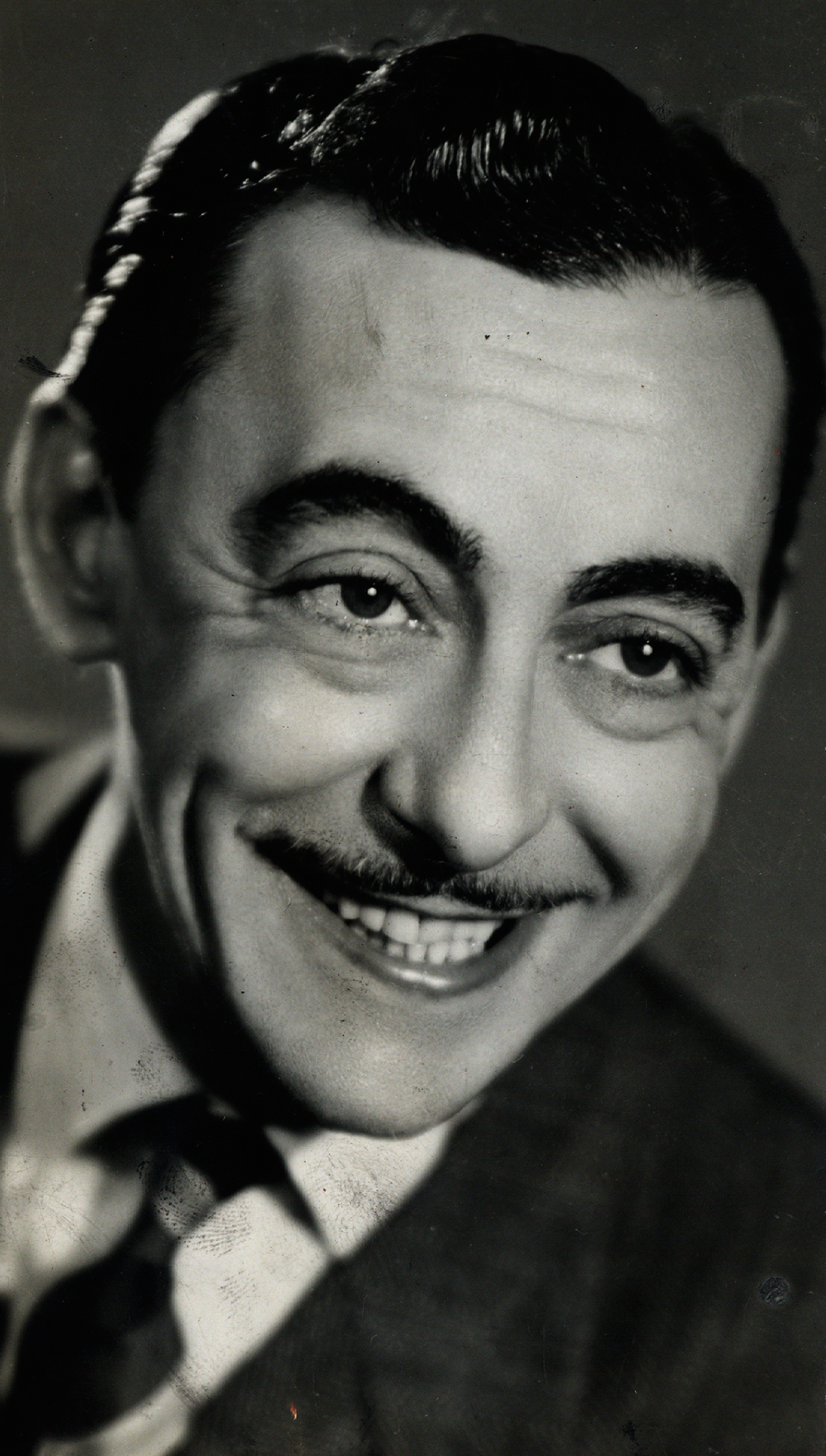
- Mesquitinha in 1955
- Born: Olympio Bastos; 19 April 1902; Lisbon, Portugal
- Died: 10 June 1956 (aged 54); Rio de Janeiro, Brazil
- Occupations: Actor; Director; Comedian
- Years active: 1923–1956
- Spouse: Olga Bastos

Mesquitinha (born Olympio Bastos; 19 April 1902 – 10 June 1956) was a Portuguese-born Brazilian actor, comedian and director. He appeared in a number of Chanchadas during the 1930s and 1940s including Hello, Hello, Brazil! (1935) and Samba in Berlin (1943).

== Selected filmography ==
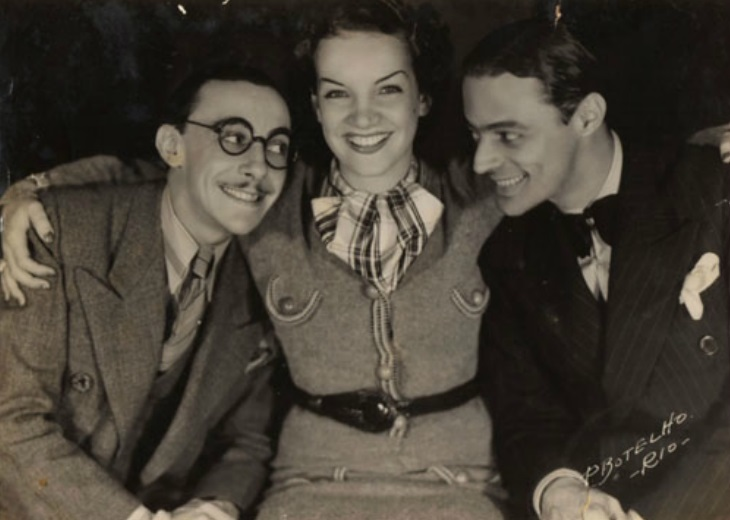
Mesquitinha (left) with Carmen Miranda and Barbosa Júnior in 1935

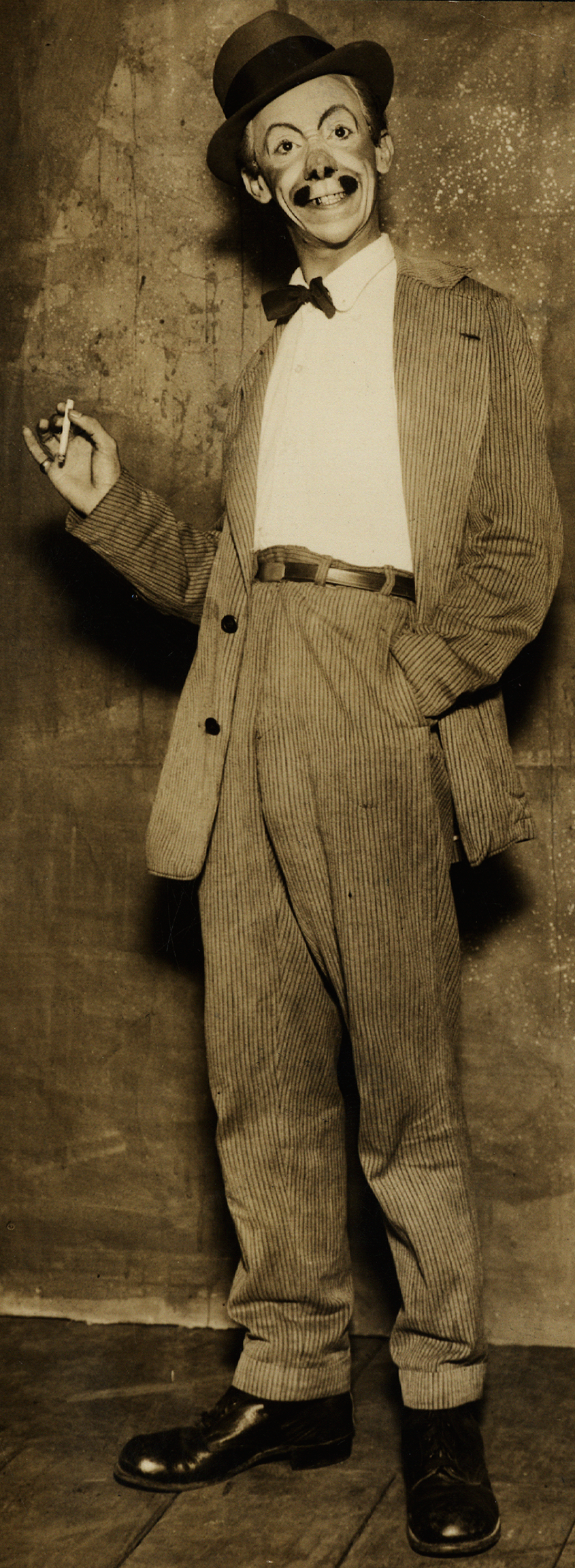
Mesquitinha

=== Director ===
- Onde Estás Felicidade? (1939)

=== Actor ===
- Estudantes (1935)
- Hello, Hello Brazil! (1935)
- Samba in Berlin (1943)

== Bibliography ==
- Dennison, Stephanie & Shaw, Lisa. Popular Cinema in Brazil. Manchester University Press, 2004
