= Elvira Pagã =

Brazilian actress (1920–2003)

- Pagã in 1957
- Born: Elvira Olivieri Cozzolino; 6 September 1920; Itararé, São Paulo, Brazil
- Died: 8 May 2003 (aged 82); Rio de Janeiro, Brazil
- Occupations: Vedette; actress; singer; writer
- Years active: 1935–1985

Elvira Olivieri Cozzolino (6 September 1920 – 8 May 2003), better known by her stage name Elvira Pagã, was a Brazilian vedette, actress, singer, writer, and painter. She was the first Rio Carnival Queen, the first woman to wear a bikini in public, and one of the first women to undergo cosmetic surgery in Brazil. Talented and controversial, she defied the status quo and challenged prevailing machismo with fearless audacity during the Brazilian military dictatorship and the revolutionary 1960s. In her later years, Pagã withdrew from public life, devoting herself to writing and painting, and eventually died in seclusion.

== Biography ==
=== Early life ===
Elvira Olivieri Cozzolino was born on 6 September 1920 in Itararé, São Paulo, Brazil. She moved as a child with her family to Rio de Janeiro and attended the convent school Immaculate Conception. As a student, she organized events with her sister Rosina Pagã and members of Bando da Lua to establish connections with the artistic community in Rio.

In 1935, Elvira debuted with her sister on the show Cine Ipanema as the Pagã Sisters, with the master of ceremonies Heitor Beltrão. They also sang as a duo on Rádio Mayrink Veiga, recording thirteen albums with composers such as Lamartine Babo, Ary Barroso, Braguinha, and Assis Valente. That same year, the sisters made their film debut in the movie Alô Alô Carnaval, with Francisco Alves, Dircinha Batista and Carmen Miranda. The following year, they appeared in the movie Cidade-Mulher, directed by Humberto Mauro, singing the title song "Noel Rosa" with Orlando Silva. The sisters then went on the Rio Carnival circuit with the song "Não te dou a chupeta", and toured for four months through Argentina, Chile and Peru. They made three more films together, O Bobo do Rei (1936), Tres anclados en París (1938), and Favela (1939), before splitting up due to Elvira's 1940 marriage to Theodoro Eduardo Duvivier Filho, nullified in 1951.

=== Solo career ===
Elvira began a solo recording career with Continental Records of São Paulo in 1944. She released a 78'', accompanied by Conjunto Tocantins, interpreting the sambas "Arrastando o pé" by Peterpan and Afonso Teixeira and "Samburá" by Valfrido Silva and Gadé. In 1945, she recorded a four-song album, unusual for the time, with the songs "E o mundo se distrai" and "Meu amor és tu" by Gadé, Almanir Grego and Amado Régis; and the songs "Cabelo azul" and "Briga de peru" by Roberto Martins and Herivelto Martins. That same year, she released a second album with two sambas, "Na feira do cais dourado" by Nelson Teixeira and Nelson Trigueiro, and "Um ranchinho na lua" by Babi de Oliveira.

As the 1950s approached, Pagã's career went in a different direction. She continued recording and made other two films, but her growing notoriety and scandal life seemed to follow her. In 1949, she became Rio's first Carnival Queen. In the early 1950s, after breaking her swimsuit and refashioning it into a bikini, she became known as the first woman to wear a bikini on Copacabana beach. (Note: Bikinis at the time were seen as appropriate attire only for the burlesque theaters, at which Pagã performed in skimpy costumes and sometimes in the nude.) In 1952, she was invited to appear at the Piauí centennial celebrations. However, the Catholic Church banned her appearance as immoral, causing the city to cancel her engagement. Then in 1954, she shocked her christmas card recipients by sending them a nude photograph of herself, after having cosmetic surgery to enhance the aesthetic appearance of her breasts. It was one of the first known elective plastic surgeries.

In the late 1950s, after numerous arrests, stalkings, and attacks both physically and from the media, she decided to retire and write a few books, including "Revelações" and "Vida e Morte". She also began painting and held a showing of twenty of her oil paintings.

Pagã died a recluse on 8 May 2003, but the press did not learn of her death until August.

== Filmography ==
- Alô Alô Carnaval (1936)
- Cidade-Mulher (1936)
- O Bobo do Rei (1936)
- Tres anclados en París (1938)
- Favela (1939)
- Laranja-da-China (1940)
- Vegas Nights (1948)
- Carnaval no Fogo (1949)
- Dominó Negro (1949)
- Écharpe de Seda (1950)
- Aviso aos Navegantes (1950)
- Assim Era a Atlântida (1975)

== Discography ==
=== As Pagã Sisters ===
- Não foi assim/Carnaval é Rei (1935)
- A boêmia da lua/Não beba tanto assim (1936)
- O samba começou (1937)
- Meu amor não me Deixou (1938)
- Quem e essa morena (1939)
- Eu sei ... (1940)
- Abana Baiana/Vai dormir criança (1941)
- Coco Dendê (1942)
- Encontrei um amor (1943)
- Maria (1946)
- Cassetete não (1951)

=== Solo career ===
- Arrastando o pé/Samburá (1944) • Continental • 78
- Na feira do cais dourado/Um ranchinho na lua (1945) • Continental • 78
- E o mundo se distrai-Meu amor és tu/Cabelo azul-Briga de peru (1945) • Continental • 78
- Marcha do ré/Sangue e areia (1949) • Star • 78
- Vamos pescar/Sururu de capote (1950) • Star • 78
- Batuca daqui, batuca de lá (1950) • Star • 78
- A rainha da mata/Pau rolou (1951) • Carnaval • 78
- Saudade que vive em mim/Cassetete, não! (1951) • Star • 78
- Vela acesa/Viva los toros (1953) • Marajoara • 78
- Reticências/Sou feliz (1953) • Todamérica • 78
- Marreta o bombo/Condenada (1954) • Ritmos • 78

== Publishing ==
=== Books ===
- Vida e Morte (195?)
- Revelações (195?)
- Eu, Elvira Paga (1965)
- Adao e Eva (1982)
- Eu e Cristo (1984)
- Eu e os mundos (1985)

=== Songs ===
- A rainha da mata (with Antônio Valentim)
- Batuca daqui, batuca de lá (with Antônio Valentim)
- Cassetete, não!
- Condenada
- Marreta o bombo
- Reticências
- Saudade que vive em mim (with Antônio Valentim)
- Sou feliz (with M. Zamorano)
- Vamos pescar (with Antônio Valentim)
- Vela acesa (with Antônio Valentim and Orlando Gazzaneo)
- Viva los toros (with Orlando Gazzaneo)
