= List of Brazilian films of 1935 =

A list of films produced in Brazil in 1935:

Title	Director	Cast	Genre	Notes
Hello, Hello Brazil!	João de Barro, Wallace Downey	Almirante, Ary Barroso, Carmen Miranda, Aurora Miranda	Musical comedy	
Cabocla Bonita	Leo Marten	Sonia Veiga, Sílvio Vieira, Dulce de Almeida	Drama	
Estudantes	Wallace Downey	Carmen Miranda, Barbosa Júnior, Mesquitinha	Musical comedy	
Favela Dos Meus Amores	Humberto Mauro	Sílvio Caldas, Jaime Costa, Belmira de Almeida		
Fazendo Fitas	Vittorio Capellaro	Alvarenga, Cândido Botelho, Alzirinha Camargo	Musical	

== See also ==
- 1935 in Brazil
