= Estudantes =

1935 film directed by Wallace Downey

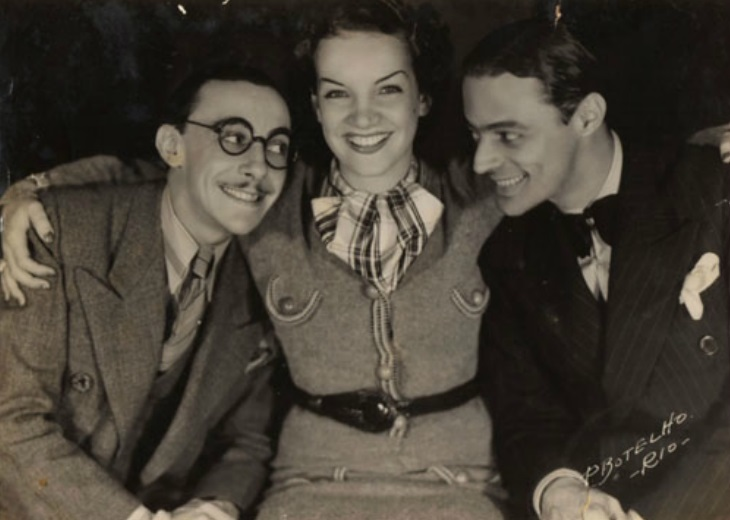
- Mesquitinha (left) with Carmen Miranda and Barbosa Júnior in Estudantes.
- Directed by: Wallace Downey
- Written by: Alberto Ribeiro; João de Barro
- Produced by: Adhemar Gonzaga; Wallace Downey
- Cinematography: Edgar Brasil; Antonio Medeiros
- Distributed by: Waldow Filmes and Cinédia
- Release date: 8 July 1935
- Running time: 1 hr. 10 min.
- Country: Brazil
- Language: Portuguese

Estudantes is a 1935 Brazilian musical comedy film directed by Wallace Downey and starring Carmen Miranda, Barbosa Júnior, Mesquitinha, and Mário Reis.

Initially titled Folia de Estudantes, this motion picture was shot entirely in a single week at the studios and labs of Cinédia. It premiered on July 8, 1935, at The Cine Alhambra, in Rio de Janeiro. It played in most theaters for two weeks. It was also shown in São Paulo, at Cine Odeon (Sala Vermelha), debuting on July 15 of that year. Viewed historically as a lost film, as of 2017, no prints of this motion picture are known to exist.

== Plot ==
Carmen Miranda, in her role as a radio singer named Mimi, is seen courted by three students.

== Production ==
The film was a co-production of Waldow Filmes and Cinédia studios, directed by Wallace Downey and based on a script by musicians João de Barro and Alberto Ribeiro. The setting is at a student residence within a university. The Mimi character was Carmen Miranda's debut acting role on film. She also sings in the movie. The crooner romantically pursuing her is played by Mário Reis. Two other students, played by Mesquetinha and Bárbosa Júnior, also vie for her affections, giving rise to a wealth of comic incidents. Although the film's soundtrack featured well-known carnival "marchas" and sambas, it was not designed to tie in with any annual celebrations. The film was an example of so-called 'mid-year' productions (de meio de ano), the premieres of which were often timed to coincide with the 'festas juninas' or popular Catholic festivals held in June.

Inspired by the success of this film, other vehicles for carnival music, the 'mid-year' musicals, were created as publicity tools to promote the radio and record industries. Estudantes featured musical numbers associated with popular religious celebrations. The song 'Cadê Mimi?' (Where's Mimi?), performed by Mário Reis as he serenades Carmen Miranda's character, subsequently became a huge hit throughout Brazil.

== Cast ==
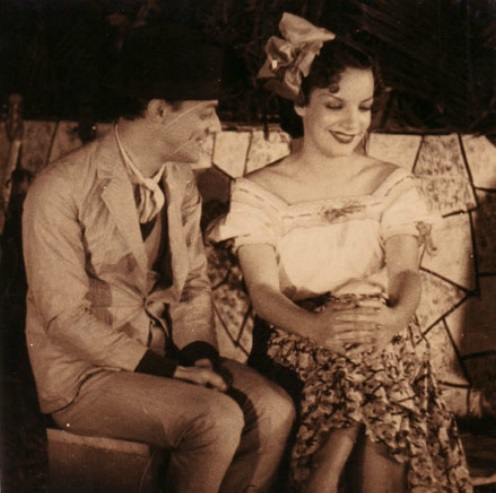
Carmen Miranda and Barbosa Júnior in the movie scene

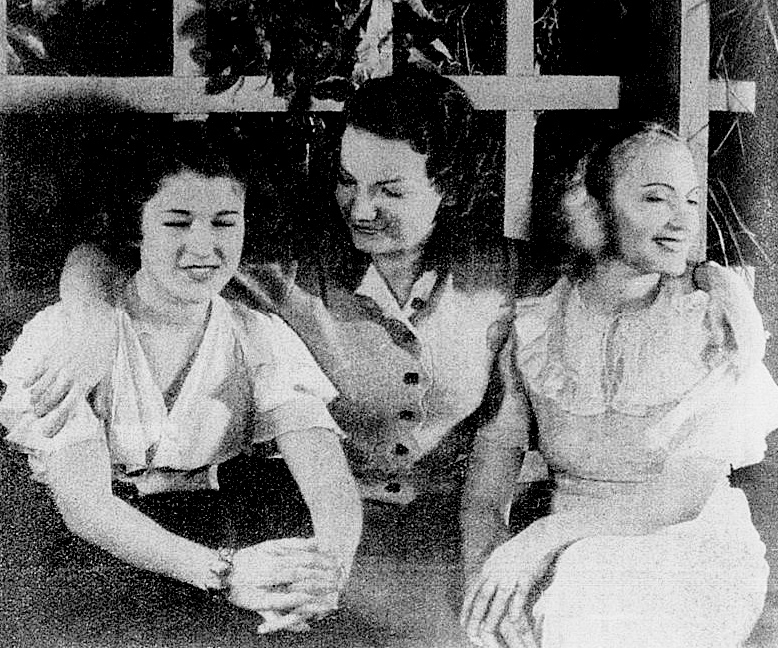
Carmen Miranda (center) and sisters Jeanette and Dulce Weyting

- Carmen Miranda as Mimi
- Barbosa Júnior as Flores
- Mesquitinha as Ramalhete
- Mário Reis as Mário
- Almirante as Himself
- Ivo Astolphi as Himself (as Bando da Lua)
- Simão Boutman as Himself
- Hervê Cordovil as Himself
- Aloysio De Oliveira as Himself (as Bando da Lua)
- Oswaldo de Moraes Eboli as Himself (as Bando da Lua)
- Jaime Ferreira
- Silva Filho
- Adélia Fontes
- Hélio Jordão as Himself (as Bando da Lua)
- Benedito Lacerda as Himself
- César Ladeira as Locutor
- Nina Marina
- Silvinha Melo as Herself
- Aurora Miranda as Herself
- Jorge Murad
- Afonso Osório as Himself (as Bando da Lua)
- Armando Osório as Himself (as Bando da Lua)
- Stênio Osório as Himself (as Bando da Lua)
- Carmem Silva as Herself
- Sílvio Silva as Teacher
- Haroldo Tapajós as Himself (as Irmãos Tapajós)
- Paulo Tapajós as Himself (as Irmãos Tapajós)
- Jeanette Weyting
- Dulce Weyting

== Critical reception ==
Estudantes received mixed reviews. An anonymous P. de L., writing for the Rio newspaper O Globo on 25 June 1935, called it a retrograde step in relation to "Alô, alô, Brasil!". Alfredo Sade, writing in the Rio-based publication A Batalha in July 1935, argued that Estudantes was a far superior film. He praised the quality of photography and the sound in what he termed this 'very Brazilian musical comedy'. Another anonymous review by a certain A. F. in the newspaper Diário Português of July 1935 argued that Estudantes's greatest value was its spontaneity and the promise that it and its young creators represented for the future of the cinema industry in Brazil. This potential was to be more fully realised in Cinédia's next production, Alô, Alô, Carnaval!.

== Musical numbers ==
- Linda Mimi ... Performed by Mário Reis
- Sonho de Papel ... Performed by Carmen Miranda
- E Bateu-se a Chapa ... Performed by Carmen Miranda
- Onde Está o Seu Carneirinho? ... Performed by Aurora Miranda
- Linda Ninon ... Performed by Aurora Miranda
- Ele ou Eu ... Performed by Silvinha Melo & Irmãos Tapajós
- Lulu ... Performed by Bando da Lua
- Assim Como o Rio ... Performed by Almirante
