= Raul Torres (singer) =

Raul Montes Torres (Botucatu, July 11, 1906 — São Paulo, July 12, 1970) was a Brazilian singer. In 1937, together with his nephew Antenor Serra, he formed a Caipira music duo; after the duo broke up in 1942, he formed a new duo with João Batista Pinto, known as Raul Torres & Florêncio.

== Biography ==
Torres was born on July 11, 1906 in Botucatu. He came from a family of poor Spanish immigrants. His first appearance on Brazilian radio was in 1927 on Rádio Educadora Paulista and Rádio Cruzeiro do Sul; that same year, he made his first recordings on Brasilphone, with the songs "Segura o Coco, Maria" b/w "Verde e Amarelo." As his fame grew in Brazil, Torres assembled a group, Raul Torres e sua Embaixada, and toured Paraguay in 1935, and again in 1944 and 1950; he became the principal reason for the increased popularity of Caipira music in that country. A star in Rio de Janeiro, Torres recorded profusely in the 1930s and 1940s, recording with João Pacífico, Lamartine Babo, Francisco de Morais Alves, Sílvio Caldas, Jaime Vogeler, Noel Rosa, and Moreira da Silva. From 1937 to 1942, Torres recorded with his nephew, Antenor Serra; among their releases were the Brazilian hit singles "Cigana," "Meu Cavalo Zaino," and "Boiada Cuiabana." After this, Torres recorded with Florêncio (João Baptista Pinto).

Torres recorded 456 songs before his death in 1970, and songs that he sang or wrote were covered frequently by other Caipiras musicians. His music profoundly influenced the development of sertanejo music; the genre's most prominent exponents, such as Leandro e Leonardo and Chitãozinho e Xororó, have all recorded songs written by Torres.
