= A Preta do Acarajé =

Song by Carmen Miranda
- Released: 1939
- Genre: Samba
- Label: Odeon Records
- Composer(s): Dorival Caymmi

A Preta do Acarajé is a song by Dorival Caymmi, recorded by Carmen Miranda on February 27, 1939, with the Conjunto Regional and the participation of Caymmi, released by Odeon Records. It was Dorival Caymmi's first record.

Along with it, another classic by Caymmi, "O Que É que a Baiana Tem?" was also recorded in a duet with Carmen, which would be part of the soundtrack for the movie Banana da Terra (1939), directed by Wallace Downey.

== Background ==
Dorival Caymmi's first record was released in 1939 as a duet with Carmen Miranda. Both songs were composed by Caymmi: on side A, "O Que É que a Baiana Tem?" (What Does the Baiana Have?); on side B, "A Preta do Acarajé" (The Acarajé Seller). In the recording of the latter, the singer Dalva de Oliveira, who would only achieve major success in Brazil starting in the 1940s, sang the "high notes Carmen’s voice couldn’t reach," according to Luiz Henrique Saia's account.

"O Que É que a Baiana Tem?" was already a hit before it was recorded, thanks to its inclusion in the musical film Banana da Terra. The song was added at the last minute, replacing "Na Baixa do Sapateiro" (Bahia), written by Ary Barroso. This substitution occurred because the film's sets were already prepared when Barroso demanded double the agreed amount from producer Wallace Downey—possibly "to ensure a minimum financial return" in the event the song was commercialized abroad, as the contract stipulated that Downey would control the rights "for foreign countries."

== Re-recordings ==
Dorival Caymmi performed this song on his album Caymmi in 1972. Gal Costa re-recorded the track for her album Gal Tropical, released by Universal Music in 1979. Ná Ozzetti also performed the song on her album Balangandãs.
