= Sílvio Caldas =

Brazilian singer and composer (1908–1998)

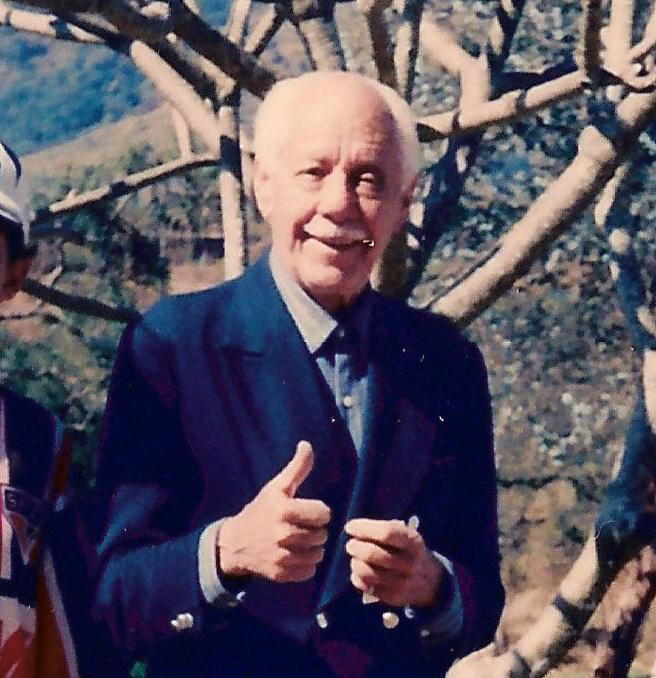

Background information
- Born: Sílvio Antônio Narciso de Figueiredo Caldas; 23 May 1908; Rio de Janeiro, Brazil
- Died: 3 February 1998 (aged 89) São Paulo, Brazil
- Genres: Samba; Waltz; Seresta
- Occupations: Musician, composer, and singer
- Years active: 1927—1998

Sílvio Antônio Narciso de Figueiredo Caldas (23 May 1908 – 3 February 1998) was a Brazilian singer and composer.

== Early life ==
Caldas was born on 23 May 1908 in the São Cristóvão neighborhood of Rio de Janeiro. His father, Antonio Narciso Caldas, was the owner of a musical instrument store, who tuned instruments and worked on pianos and was also a composer. His mother, Alcina Figueiredo Caldas, was a singer of romantic music. He had a brother, Murilo, who also was a notable musician. Starting at 5 years old, Sílvio began to actively participate in Rio's Carnaval, becoming a member of the Família Ideal Bloco. At 6 years old, he had his first performance at Teatro Fênix.

At the same time, he attended Escola Coronel Cabrita, where he was expelled for fighting with students and professors. He later went to Escola Nilo Peçanha, where he continued to fight with his peers. At 9 years old, he began to work as a mechanics apprentice at Garagem Esperança, on the same street as his house. In 1924, at 16, he moved to São Paulo for work, where he briefly stayed. From there, he moved to Catanduva, where he worked various odd jobs. In 1927, he returned to Rio de Janeiro.

== Musical career ==
After returning to Rio, he performed a serenade during which Antonio Gomes, artistic director of Rádio Ipanema, was present. He took Caldas to Rádio Mayrink Veiga, where he sang for free for some time, starting his musical career.

=== First albums and radio works ===
In 1929, Caldas went to Rádio Sociedade and performed for 20 mil-réis per night, becoming a part of a line-up that also included Gastão Formenti, Francisco Alves, Patrício Teixeira, and Rogério Guimarães. At the same time, he still worked as a mechanic, dealing specifically with semis at the time of the opening of the current Via Dutra.

Caldas recorded some albums with the German production company Brunswick, which initially went to Brazil to open factories for snooker accessories. Overall, no other artist from the label (which included names such as Gastão, Carmen Miranda, and Bando da Lua) moved away from the brand and closed its doors in 1931.

In 1931, he was invited to the cast of O Brasil do Amor magazine (by Ary Barroso and Marques Porto) at the Teatro Recreio. During this performance, Caldas sang "Gente Bamba" and "Malandragem", both written by Ary. That same year, he recorded "Gente Bamba" through RCA Victor under the title "Faceira" – the song had been offered beforehand to Mário Reis, but declined the offer. He had already recorded "Tracuá de Ferrô", by Sátiro de Melo, but only achieved success with the Barroso composition.

A month after 'O Brasil do Amor, Caldas participated again in another show, É do Balacobaco, another creation of Barroso and Marques, cowritten by Vitor Pujol. This time, he sang "Malandro" by Freire Júnior and Francisco Alves. Through partnerships he made in theatre, he went to Buenos Aires, in Argentina, starting his international career. Even still, between 1930 and 1931, he recorded a total of 35 records with two songs each.

In 1932, he recorded "Maria", composrer by Barroso and with lyrics by Luiz Peixoto. In 1933, the record "Eu Vou para o Maranhão" was released, along with "Chorei" by André Filho, "Mimi" by Uriel Lourival, and the self-composed "Na Aldeia", in partnership with Carusinho e De Chocolat. That same year, he launched the marcha de carnaval "Segura Esta Mulher", also by Barroso.

=== Betting on self compositions and film ===
Caldas began to consolidate himself as a composer in 1933, releasing "Eu Vivo Sem Destino" (cowritten with Wilson Batista and Osvaldo Santiago) and “Na Floresta" (cowritten with Cartola). In 1934, he began a largely successful partnership with the poet, journalist, and chronicler Orestes Barbosa, which brought 14 compositions, including "Soluços" (recorded in 1934 by Floriano Belham), "Serenata" (recorded by Caldas 1935), "Vidro Vazio" (composed in 1936 and recorded by J. P. de Barros), and "Santa dos Meus Amores" (composed in 1936 and recorded by Caldas). Their best year came in 1937, when they composed 8 songs, among them "Quase Que Eu Disse", "Arranha-Céu", and their biggest hit "Chão de Estrelas". Their last two compositions were released in 1938: "Única Rima" and "Suburbana".

Caldas began to act in cinema in 1935, acting in Favela dos Meus Amores, directed by Humberto Mauro. During the film, he sang "Ao Luar..." (Barroso), "Quando um Sambista Morre", "Favela" (Custódio Mesquita and Orestes), "Tolinha" (Custódio), "Arrependimento" (himself and Cristóvão de Alencar), "Quase Que Eu Disse" (Orestes and Sílvio), and "Torturante Ironia".

=== Move to São Paulo and the decline of the Radio Era ===
In 1957.

In 1950, he moved to São Paulo (specifically to the Vila Madalena neighborhood), where he signed an exclusive contract with Rádio Excelsior. In 1954, he was hired by the recently arrived Columbia Records. In 1956, he presented the "Os Degraus da Glória" program on Rádio Gazeta and later became part of his own weekly program on TV Record. While there, he also bought Mocambo nightclub, which he would manage.

From the 1960s onward, Caldas soon had to confront the rise of Bossa Nova, the Jovem Guarda, and rock and roll, which took up considerable radio space. Although not particularly a fan of bossa nova, he recorded, with his own style, some bossa songs, such as "Serenata do Adeus" (Vinicius de Moraes), "Apelo" (Baden Powell and Moraes), "Consolação", "Gente Humilde" (Garoto, Vinicius and Chico Buarque), and "Se Todos Fossem Iguais a Você" (Tom Jobim and Moraes).

By the end of the 1970s, he retired from making music, but not from performing. His last show was in 1997, at 85 years old, at Sesc Pompeia with Miltinho, Doris Monteiro, Noite Ilustrada and Trovadores Urbanos. In 1988, on his 80th birthday, he received a tribute from the Academia Brasileira de Letras.

== Personal life and death ==
At 25 years old, Caldas married Angelina Caldas. After she died, he married Miriam, with whom he had four children. One of their children, Silvinha, died at 9 years old in 1975 after being hit by a car in front of a hotel in Copacabana. He had a country home in Atibaia, 65 km outside of São Paulo. During his career, he announced various times that he would retire to raise chickens on the property.

Caldas died in São Paulo on 3 February 1998, at 89 years old with his wife Miriam and three of his children by his side.

== Discography ==
Taken from the following sources.

=== Discs (LPs and studio and live CDs) ===
- 1951 - Com a saudade pelo braço
- 1952 - Saudades
- 1953 - Música de Ary Barroso - Canta Sílvio Caldas
- 1956 - Canta o seresteiro
- 1956 - Sílvio Caldas
- 1957 - Serenata
- 1958 - Cabelos brancos
- 1958 - O seresteiro
- 1960 - Eternamente
- 1960 - Sílvio Caldas em pessoa
- 1962 - Titio canta para você
- 1968 - Isto é São Paulo
- 1971 - Sílvio Caldas
- 1971 - Elizeth Cardoso e Sílvio Caldas - Volume II
- 1971 - Elizeth Cardoso e Sílvio Caldas - Volume I
- 1973 - Sílvio Caldas ao vivo - Histórias da MPB
- 1974 - Grandes sucessos com Sílvio Caldas
- 1974 - Sílvio Caldas
- 1975 - Depoimento
- 1975 - Sílvio Caldas "especial" ao vivo
- 1977 - Sílvio Caldas (RGE/Fermata)
- 1978 - Sílvio Caldas e Pedro Vargas ao vivo no Canecão
- 1991 - Silvio Caldas
- 1996 - Quando canta o seresteiro

=== 78 rpm ===
- 1930 - "Pra que forçar?" / "Catuca Maroca"
- 1930 - "Ioiô deste ano" / "O teu amor eu desprezei"
- 1930 - "Recordar é viver" / "Amor de poeta"
- 1930 - "Dor de palhaço" / "Pobrezinha da Madalena"
- 1930 - "Chorei nega" / "Teu desprezo"
- 1930 - "Lalá" / "Nem queiras saber"
- 1930 - "Alto lá"
- 1930 - "Samba de reúna" / "Vira as butuca"
- 1930 - "Baianinha" / "Gamela quebrada"
- 1930 - "Bambina, meu bem!" / "Sestrosa"
- 1930 - "Prá cima de mim não" / "Sonhei que te beijava"
- 1930 - "Santa Padroeira" / "Amar! meu bem"
- 1930 - "Segue teu destino" / "Psíu, meu bem"
- 1930 - "Vamos dar valor" / "Balacobaco"
- 1930 - "Ai! Luciana" / "Moreninha"
- 1930 - "Vai sair bagagem" / "Mulambo"
- 1930 - "Triste caboco"
- 1930 - "Samba no Rocha" / "É só do que há"
- 1930 - "Sou um namorado errante"
- 1930 - "Alô meu bem"
- 1930 - "Amoroso"
- 1930 - "Tracuá me ferrô"
- 1931 - "É mentira oi!" / "Um samba em Piedade"
- 1931 - "Não faz assim meu coração" / "Vai tratar da tua vida"
- 1931 - "Mão no remo!" / "Candinha"
- 1931 - "Vou implorar" / "O que é a vida?"
- 1931 - "Me deixa" / "É do balacobaco"
- 1931 - "Batuque" / "Terra de Iaiá"
- 1931 - "Faceira" / "Bahia"
- 1931 - "Gira"
- 1931 - "Para o príncipe de Gales ouvir" / "Eu vou andando"
- 1931 - "Flor morena" / "Flor mimosa"
- 1931 - "Criança louca" / "Bonequinha"
- 1931 - "Não faz mal" / "Na praia"
- 1931 - "A nega sumiu"
- 1932 - "Não dou bola" / "Vou fazer tua vontade"
- 1932 - "Eu vou pro Maranhão" / "Chorei"
- 1932 - "Segura esta mulher" / "E ela não jurou"
- 1932 - "Maria" / "Prazer é sofrer"
- 1932 - "Dormindo na rua" / "Tenho um segredo"
- 1932 - "Se eu fora rei" / "Não te perdôo"
- 1932 - "Jurei me vingar" / "Foi sonho e não volta mais"
- 1932 - "Se a sorte fosse igual"
- 1932 - "Zombando" / "Desolado"
- 1932 - "Pente fino" / "Pobre e esfarrapada"
- 1933 - "Alô Mossoró" / "Cheio de saudade"
- 1933 - "O teu olhar me inspirou" / "Saudades da mocidade"
- 1933 - "Linda lourinha" / "Vou partir"
- 1933 - "Mimi" / "Na aldeia"
- 1933 - "Feiticeira" / "Eu fiz um samba"
- 1933 - "Na floresta" / "Lenço no pescoço"
- 1933 - "Eu vivo sem destino" / "Os homens são uns anjinhos"
- 1933 - "Vitória" / "Chora"
- 1933 - "Vidro vazio" / "Flor de inverno"
- 1933 - "Pomba-rola" / "Alguém precisa morrer"
- 1934 - "Cara feia é fome" / "Agradeça a mim"
- 1934 - "São Tomé" / "Implorando o meu perdão"
- 1934 - "Meu beguin" / "Cruel ciúme"
- 1934 - "Por causa dela" / "Você me deu o bolo"
- 1934 - "Coração ingrato" / "Eu sonhei"
- 1934 - "Serenata" / "Santa dos meus amores"
- 1934 - "Se o teu amor consola" / "Vais viver no esquecimento"
- 1934 - "Perdão... Madame" / "Malandro sofredor"
- 1934 - "Tu!..." / "Perdão"
- 1935 - "Sofri demais" / "Cansado"
- 1935 - "Só por tua causa"
- 1935 - "Mágoas de um vagabundo" / "Voltaste ao teu lar"
- 1935 - "A casa dela" / "Volta, meu amor!"
- 1935 - "Nena" / "Quanto eu sinto"
- 1935 - "Há um segredo em teus cabelos" / "Só nós dois"
- 1935 - "Samaritana" / "Rainha sem trono"
- 1935 - "Minha palhoça" / "Quase que eu disse"
- 1935 - "Inquietação" / "Por causa dessa cabocla"
- 1935 - "Boneca" / "O telefone do amor"
- 1935 - "Arrependimento" / "Torturante ironia"
- 1936 - "Adeus, felicidade" / "Quando você me abandonou"
- 1936 - "Maria"
- 1936 - "A menina presidência" / "Nunca mais"
- 1936 - "Eu agora vou gritar" / "O que é teu está guardado"
- 1936 - "Acorda escola de samba" / "Noite de carnaval"
- 1936 - "Se Papai Noel quisesse" / "Passarinho"
- 1936 - "Menos eu" / "Saudade dela"
- 1936 - "Até quando?" / "O nome dela não digo"
- 1936 - "Um caboclo abandonado" / "Madrugada"
- 1936 - "Meu erro" / "O que é que há?"
- 1936 - "Tudo me fala do teu olhar" / "Morena da minha aldeia"
- 1936 - "Teus ciúmes" / "Companheiro dileto"
- 1936 - "Isis" / "Última carta de amor"
- 1937 - "Onde vai você Maria?"
- 1937 - "Ratoeira"
- 1937 - "Seu Gaspar" / "Teu riso tem"
- 1937 - "Pastorinhas" / "Choro por teu amor"
- 1937 - "Quando eu penso na Bahia"
- 1937 - "Eu não sei..." / "Carta sonora"
- 1937 - "Até breve" / "Por amor ao meu amor"
- 1937 - "Cigana" / "Nunca mais"
- 1937 - "Meu limão, meu limoeiro" / "Confessando que te adoro"
- 1937 - "Arranha-céu" / "Chão de estrelas"
- 1937 - "Sabiá" / "Lua triste"
- 1938 - "Mágoas de um trovador" / "Suburbana"
- 1938 - "Mente ao meu coração" / "Não chora"
- 1938 - "Coração" / "Flor de lótus"
- 1938 - "Pra que mentir" / "Cessa tudo"
- 1938 - "Ô lelê.. ô lalá..." / "Era ela"
- 1938 - "Na mão direita" / "Florisbela"
- 1938 - "Com pensamento em você" / "Não me abandones nunca"
- 1938 - "Falsa felicidade" / "Sorris de minha dor"
- 1938 - "Professora"
- 1939 - "Tú és a culpada"
- 1939 - "Tua partida" / "Desprezo"
- 1939 - "Maria" / "No rancho fundo"
- 1939 - "Deusa da minha rua" / "Da cor do pecado"
- 1939 - "Já sei sorrir" / "Mentira carioca"
- 1939 - "Eu e você" / "Maria"
- 1940 - "Olho nela" / "Casa, casa viuvinha"
- 1940 - "Capim mimoso" / "Colombina está chorando"
- 1940 - "Sinhá moça chorou" / "Símbolo sagrado"
- 1940 - "Eu quero essa mulher" / "Andorinha"
- 1940 - "O amor é assim" / "Preto velho"
- 1940 - "Kátia" / "Não"
- 1940 - "Mulher" / "Velho realejo"
- 1941 - "Chuva miúda" / "Se for preciso eu caso"
- 1941 - "Minha América" / "Gaivota"
- 1941 - "Se tu soubesses" / "Sempre você"
- 1941 - "Morena boca de ouro" / "Três lágrimas"
- 1941 - "Caixinha de música" / "O pião"
- 1941 - "Rosinha"
- 1942 - "A mulher dos 30 anos" / "Por causa dela"
- 1942 - "Fibra de herói" / "Canção do soldado"
- 1942 - "Ausência" / "Meus 20 anos"
- 1942 - "Sereia" / "Duas janelas"
- 1942 - "Aquarela do Brasil" / "Na baixa do sapateiro"
- 1943 - "Mágoas de um trovador" / "Suburbana"
- 1943 - "É inútil mentir" / "O samba de Beatriz"
- 1943 - "Promessa" / "A vida em quatro tempo"
- 1943 - "Que é, que é?" / "Serrana"
- 1943 - "Modinha" / "Meu amigo violão"
- 1943 - "Não voltarás, nem voltarei..." / "Ninotchka"
- 1944 - "Pif-paf" / "Fica doido varrido"
- 1944 - "Algodão" / "Noturno em tempo de samba"
- 1944 - "Como os rios que correm pro mar" / "Valsa do meu subúrbio"
- 1945 - "Feitiçaria" / "Sim ou não"
- 1946 - "Com a saudade pelo braço" / "Despertar da montanha"
- 1946 - "Não chores assim..." / "Pastora dos olhos castanhos"
- 1946 - "Destino traçado" / "Ana Maria"
- 1946 - "E ela não voltou" / "O teu olhar"
- 1946 - "Tire a camisa" / "Companheira de quem ama"
- 1946 - "Anda Luzia!" / "Gilda"
- 1946 - "Minha casa" / "Nunca soubeste amar"
- 1949 - "Chuva e vento" / "Tarde de maio"
- 1949 - "Boa noite amor" / "A saudade"
- 1949 - "Não me pergunte" / "Você de mim não tem dó"
- 1949 - "Chora que passa" / "O circo chegou"
- 1950 - "Pastorinhas" / "Coração ingrato"
- 1950 - "Marcha do São Cristóvão" / "Marcha do Vasco"
- 1950 - "Amada mia" / "Homem marcado"
- 1950 - "Salve o Marquês" / "Obrigado doutor"
- 1951 - "A culpa é sua" / "Como é que eu vou me arranjar"
- 1951 - "Mamãe Dolores" / "Leonor"
- 1951 - "Nos braços de Isabel" / "Quanto dói uma saudade"
- 1951 - "O telefone do amor" / "Quase que eu disse"
- 1951 - "Boneca" / "Menos eu"
- 1951 - "Cigana" / "Meu limão, meu limoeiro"
- 1951 - "Nossa Senhora da Glória" / "Voltaste"
- 1951 - "Cabelos cor de prata" / "Violões em funeral"
- 1953 - "Romance de amor" / "Canção das mães"
- 1953 - "Você voltou" / "Alucinação"
- 1953 - "Chão de estrelas" / "Arranha-céu"
- 1953 - "Silêncio do cantor" / "Flamboyant"
- 1954 - "Pra casa eu não vou" / "Perdoa, Senhor"
- 1954 - "Perfíl de São Paulo" / "Se eu pudesse"
- 1954 - "São Francisco" / "Vivo em paz"
- 1954 - "Poema dos olhos da amada" / "Você não veio"
- 1955 - "Meu segredo" / "Pierrô"
- 1955 - "A única rima" / "Jangada"
- 1955 - "Turca do meu Brasil" / "Mágoa"
- 1955 - "Marcha do Vasco"
- 1957 - "Viva meu samba" / "Prelúdio"
- 1957 - "Canção para mamãe" / "Porto dos casais"
- 1958 - "Cabeça chata" / "Verde e amarelo"
- 1958 - "Novos rumos" / "Nos braços de Isabel"
- 1959 - "Pistom de gafieira" / "Saudade de você"
- 1959 - "Compromisso com a saudade" / "Serenata do adeus"
- 1960 - "Velhos carnavais" / "Ponte enferrujada"
- 1961 - "Homenagem" / "Paciência"
- 1961 - "Qual é o babado?" / "Mas eu não ligo"

== Filmography ==
Adapted from the following source.

- 1935 - Carioca Maravilhosa
- 1935 - Alô, Alô, Brasil!
- 1935 - Favela dos Meus Amores
- 1940 - Céu Azul
- 1944 - Tristezas Não Pagam Dívidas
- 1945 - Não Adianta Chorar
- 1947 - Luz dos Meus Olhos

== Bibliography ==
- Aguiar, Ronaldo Conde (2013). Os Reis da Voz. Casa da Palavra. ISBN 978-85-773-4398-0.
