= Mário Reis =

Mário Reis may refer to:

- Mário Reis (singer) (1907-1981), Brazilian samba singer
- Mário Reis (footballer) (born 1947), Portuguese footballer and football manager
- Mario Reis (physicist), Brazilian physicist
