= Banana da Terra =

1939 film directed by Ruy Costa

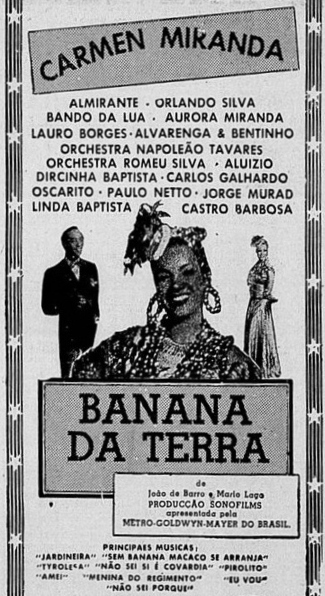
- Theatrical release poster.
- Directed by: Ruy Costa
- Written by: Mário Lago; João de Barro
- Produced by: Alberto Byington Jr. Wallace Downey
- Cinematography: Edgar Brasil
- Edited by: Ruy Costa (as E.Sá)
- Distributed by: Sonofilmes
- Release date: February 10, 1939
- Running time: 88 minutes
- Country: Brazil
- Language: Portuguese

Carmen Miranda sings Dorival Caymmi's "O Que É Que a Baiana Tem?" in Banana da Terra

Banana da Terra (English: Banana of the Land) is a 1939 Brazilian musical film directed by Ruy Costa and written by Braguinha and Mário Lago. The film stars Carmen Miranda, Dircinha Batista, and Aloysio de Oliveira. It was Miranda's last film in Brazil, before she moved to Hollywood.

== Plot ==
In Banana da Terra, the actor Oscarito plays a man in charge of a publicity campaign for bananas who decides to kidnap the queen of Bananolândia, played by Dircinha Batista. She is taken to Rio and promptly falls in love with a character played by Aloísio de Oliveira, a member of Carmen Miranda's backing group, the Bando da Lua. The action unfolds in the glamorous realm of Rio's radio station and casinos, thus providing the perfect pretext for inclusion of a variety of musical numbers.

== Production ==
In 1939, Sonofilmes released the musical comedy Banana da Terra, which, like many of its musical predecessors, belonged to the tradition of carnival films that included hit songs and were released just before the annual celebrations. According to the Jornal do Brasil newspaper, Banana da Terra was to premiere on 10 February at the MGM-owned cinemas in Rio and São Paulo, the Pedro II cinema in Petrópolis, in the state of Rio de Janeiro, and the Guarani cinema in Salvador, Bahia, as well as in Recife, Porto Alegre and Ribeirão Preto. Negotiations were also underway to show the film in the state capitals of Curitiba and Belo Horizonte. Thanks to the links between Alberto Byington Jr, Wallace Downey's associate, and Hollywood, this Sonofilmes production was distributed by MGM in Brazil, and consequently premiered in the luxurious Metro Passeio in Rio.

Banana da Terra proved to be a great commercial success and to markedly influence the chanchada tradition, not least by combining self-deprecating humour with a tongue-in-cheek critique of Hollywood clichés.

The plot of the movie, first and foremost a construct to link together the various musical numbers, revolves around the imaginary Pacific island of Bananolândia, an allegorical tropical paradise, which was faced with the problem of a surplus of bananas. In this self-parodic comedy, Brazil adopts the reflected identity of the exotic island of plenty.

These include "A Jardineira" by Benedito Lacerda and Humberto Porto, sung by Orlando Silva, which proved to be the carnival smash of the 1939 celebrations, and "Sei que é covardia" by Ataúflo Alves and Claudionor Cruz. Banana da Terra is best remembered for Carmen Miranda's rendition of the Dorival Caymmi song "O que é que a baiana tem?", dresses in the "baiana" costume, in keeping with the song's lyrics. It is said that the composer went to Miranda's house where he taught her performance. But it was Miranda who made the look her own and used it to launch her international career as the embodiment of a pan-Latin American identity. Banana da Terra was to be Miranda's last Brazilian film; it was when performing its hit song "O que é que a baiana tem?" at Rio's Urca casino that she was "discovered" by the show business impresario Lee Shubert and taken to Broadway, and subsequently to Hollywood.

== Cast ==
- Carmen Miranda
- Dircinha Batista
- Oscarito
- Aloísio de Oliveira
- Aurora Miranda
- Lauro Borges
- Jorge Murad
- Neide Martins
- Mario Silva
- Paulo Neto
- Almirante
- Alvarenga
- Fernando Alvarez
- Ivo Astolphi
- Castro Barbosa
- Linda Batista
- Emilinha Borba
- Oswaldo de Moraes Eboli
- Carlos Galhardo
- Hélio Jordão
- Barbosa Júnior
- César Ladeira
- Virgínia Lane
- Afonso Osório
- Stênio Osório
- Ranchinho
- Linda Rodrigues
- Orlando Silva
- Romeu Silva
- Napoleão Tavares

== Musical numbers ==
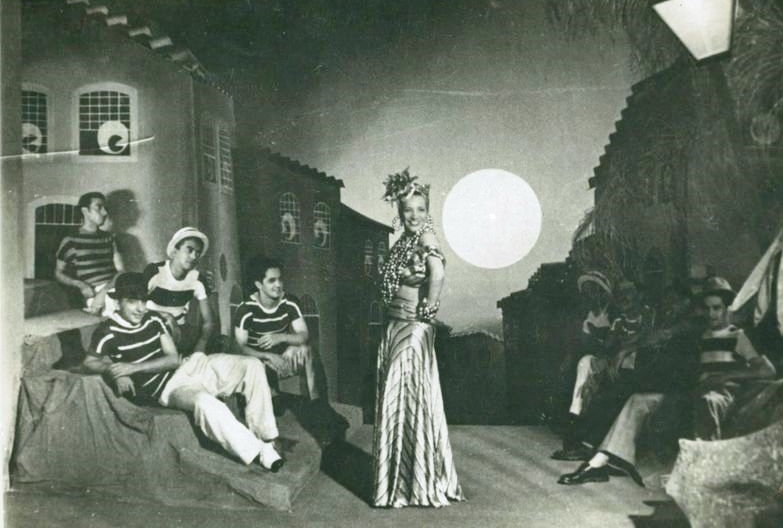
Carmen Miranda wearing a baiana costume in a scene from Banana da Terra, produced by the Sonofilmes studio.

- O Que é Que a Baiana Tem? ... Performed by Carmen Miranda
- Pirulito ... Performed by Carmen Miranda and Almirante
- Menina do Regimento ... Performed by Aurora Miranda
- A Tirolesa ... Performed by Dircinha Batista
- Eu Vou Pra Farra ... Performed by Bando da Lua
- Não Sei Por Quê ... Performed by Bando da Lua
- Sei Que É Covardia, Mas ... Performed by Carlos Galhardo
- Sem Banana ... Performed by Carlos Galhardo
- Mares da China ... Performed by Carlos Galhardo
- Amei Demais ... Performed by Castro Barbosa
- A Jardineira ... Performed by Orlando Silva

== Preservation status ==
A little over 3 minute portion of the film remains, with no complete copy known.
