= Mário Reis (singer) =

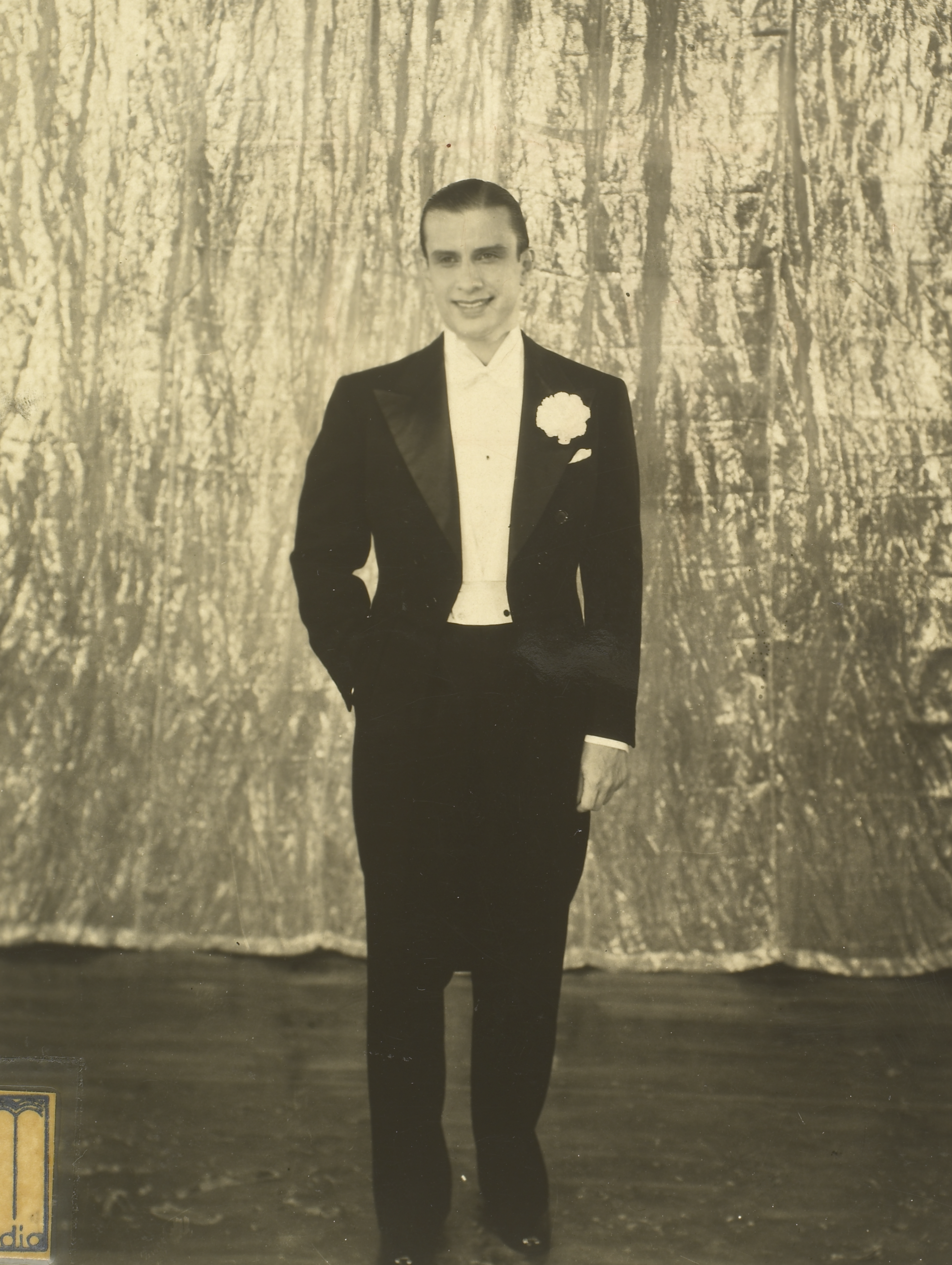
- Reis in Hello, Hello, Carnival!, 1936

Background information
- Born: Mário da Silveira Meireles Reis; December 31, 1907
- Origin: Rio de Janeiro, Brazil
- Died: October 5, 1981 (aged 73)
- Genres: Samba, marchinha
- Occupations: Songwriter, singer
- Instrument: Singer
- Years active: 1928–1971

Mário da Silveira Meireles Reis (31 December 1907 – 5 October 1981 in Rio de Janeiro), also known as Bacharel do Samba, was a popular Brazilian samba singer, active between 1928 and 1971. He collaborated with artists such as Francisco Alves, Carmen Miranda, Aracy de Almeida and Noel Rosa and was particularly successful as a radio singer.

== Biography ==
He graduated in Law and Social Sciences in the Federal University of Rio de Janeiro Faculty of Law, attending the same classes of Ary Barroso (LLB, 1929).

He recorded many hits with Carmen Miranda and Francisco Alves, with whom also performed frequently in the 1930s, all of which are regarded as amongst the finest Brazilian singers of this period. He toured in Brazil and also Argentina.

As a singer, he was known for his gentle tone, which compensated for the lack of vocal power. His singing style even today sounds modern and he is considered one of the pioneers of bossa nova. Many believe his singing influenced João Gilberto.

He spent many years away from singing career and returned years later to make records. In 1965 and 1971 he recorded two albums, this being his last.

In 1995, Julio Bressane made a film called The Mandarin about the Brazilian popular music of the 20th century, focusing especially on the life and work of Mário Reis. The singer was played by actor Fernando Eiras.

== Recordings ==
Mário Reis cantando com Carmen Miranda Alo... Alo...
Mário Reis and Carmen Miranda.

- Agora é cinza, Bide e Marçal (1933)
- Alô, alô, André Filho, com Carmen Miranda (1933)
- A razão dá-se a quem tem, Francisco Alves, Ismael Silva e Noel Rosa (1932)
- A tua vida é um segredo, Lamartine Babo (1932)
- Cadê Mimi?, Alberto Ribeiro e João de Barro (1935)
- Chegou a hora da fogueira, Lamartine Babo, com Carmen Miranda (1933).
- Dorinha, meu amor, Freitinhas (1928)
- Eva querida, Benedito Lacerda e Luiz Vassalo (1934)
- Filosofia, André Filho e Noel Rosa (1933)
- Fita amarela, Noel Rosa, com Francisco Alves (1932)
- Formosa, J. Rui e Nássara (1932)
- Gosto que me enrosco, Sinhô (1929)
- Isto é lá com Santo Antônio, Lamartine Babo, com Carmen Miranda (1934)
- Joujoux e balangandãs, Lamartine Babo, com Mariah (1939)
- Jura, Sinhô (1928)
- Linda morena, Lamartine Babo (1932)
- Mulato bamba, Noel Rosa (1932)
- Nem é bom falar, Francisco Alves, Ismael Silva e Nilton Bastos (1931)
- O que será de mim?, Francisco Alves, Ismael Silva e Nilton Bastos, com Francisco Alves (1931)
- Quando o samba acabou, Noel Rosa (1933)
- Rasguei a minha fantasia, Lamartine Babo (1934)
- Ride, palhaço, Lamartine Babo (1933)
- Se você jurar, Francisco Alves, Ismael Silva e Nilton Bastos, com Francisco Alves (1931)
- Sofrer é da vida, Francisco Alves, Ismael Silva e Nilton Bastos (1932)
- Uma andorinha não faz verão, João de Barro e Lamartine Babo (1933)

== Literature ==
- ALBIN, Ricardo Cravo (Criação e Supervisão Geral). Dicionário Houaiss Ilustrado da Música Popular Brasileira. Rio de Janeiro: Paracatu, 2006.
- MORAIS JUNIOR, Luis Carlos de. O Sol nasceu pra todos:a História Secreta do Samba. Rio de Janeiro: Litteris, 2011.
