= Benedito Lacerda =

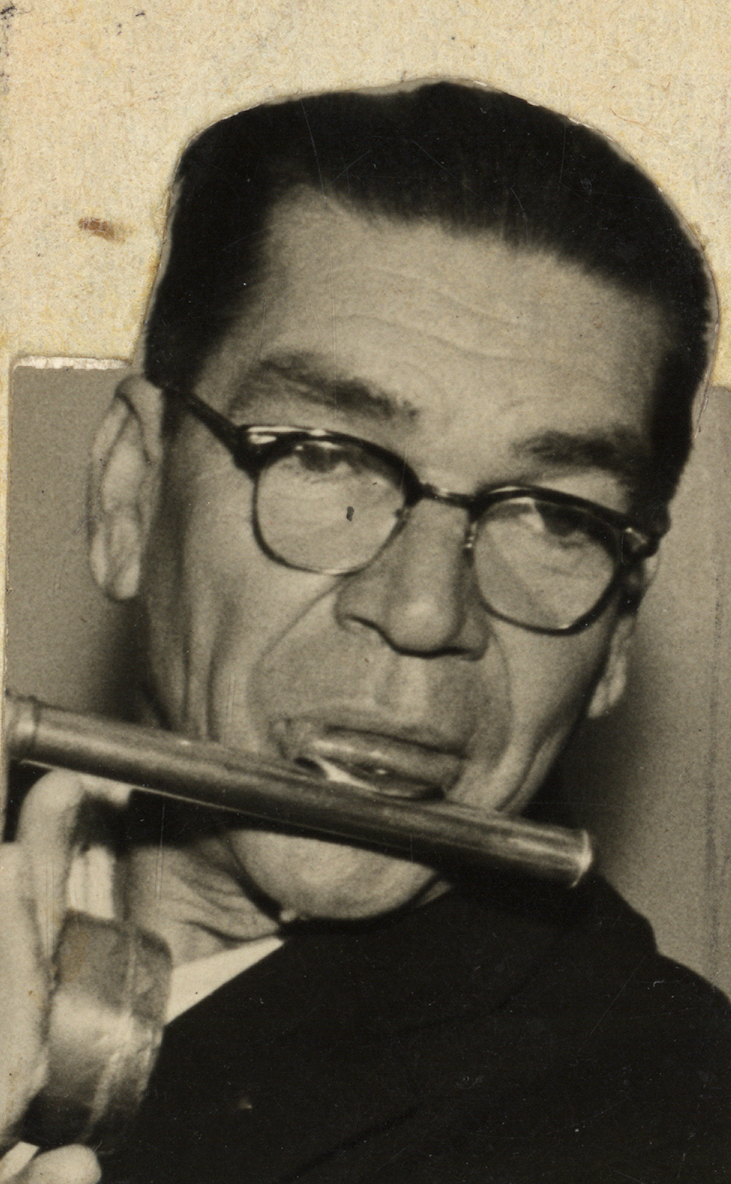

Background information
- Born: 14 March 1903; Macaé, Rio de Janeiro, Brazil
- Died: 16 February 1958 (aged 54); Rio de Janeiro, Brazil
- Genres: Samba; Choro; MPB
- Occupation(s): Flutist, composer, maestro
- Years active: 1928—1958

Benedicto Lacerda (14 March 1903 – 16 February 1958) was a Brazilian composer, flutist, and maestro. A long-time player of música popular brasileira, he is most well known for his collaborations with famous saxophonist Pixinguinha.

== Biography ==
Lacerda was born in 1903 in the city of Macaé, the child of washerwoman Dona Lousada. He later moved with his mother to the city of Rio de Janeiro, more specifically to the Estácio neighborhood. He attended performances of the Sociedade Musical Nova Aurora orchestra since his childhood. Agile in his thinking, he grew up in an environment of many choro singers and samba players, growing up alongside famed samba musicians of the time such as Bide, Noel Rosa and Ismael Silva.

Later on, Lacerda came to serve in the military and went on to play in a band in the regiment and played the bumbo, in a time where the genre was still relatively obscure. During this time period, he studied music and soon began to play the flute in the band. He became one of the regiment's flutists, becoming accomplished and rising up the ranks. He went on to play the flute in the regiment's rendition of the Antônio Carlos Gomes opera O Guarany. Lacerda served in the military for 5 years, after which he requested a discharge and began playing music full time. In 1928, he played in the regional group Boêmios da Cidade, accompanying Josephine Baker and playing in theatres, orchestral theatres, dance parties and cabarets. He also played saxophone in some jazz orchestras.

At the end of the 1920s and the beginning of the 1930s, he organized a group with Brazilian musicians, giving it the name Gente do Morro. The group was characterized for its percussions and flute solos. The group did not last for long, but traveled and performed with Noel Rosa. As Gente do Morro did not work out, Lacerda called Horondino (Dino 7 Cordas), who was a member of the group, and Canhoto do Cavaco, and the three began to regiment music to work with them. The group would later become Conjunto Regional Benedito Lacerda. They were later joined by Pixinguinha. With this group, they accompanied names such as Carmen Miranda, Luiz Barbosa, Mário Reis, Francisco Alves, and Sílvio Caldas, along with him successfully working as a composer.

In the 1940s, he played at casinos with compiled Brazilian music and created a series of anthological recordings in partnership with Pixinguinha, bringing with him an extensive repertoire of choro music. As a result of their work, they made about 40 recordings, musical editions, and albums with their sheet music. They partnered extensively and produced hits such as "Sofres porque queres", "Naquele tempo" and "Um a zero" (the latter being made long before as a celebration of a goal made by footballer Friedenreich at the 1919 South American Championship). Due to economic troubles as the regionais fell out of favor in the late 40s, Pixinguinha had to sell the rights to his compositions to Benedito Lacerda, who for this appears a co-composer of many of Pixinguinha's tunes, even those composed while Lacerda was a boy. In the recordings with Lacerda, Pixinguinha plays secondary parts on the saxophone while Lacerda plays the flute part on tunes that Pixinguinha originally wrote on that instrument.

Lacerda was an award-winning composer for Rio carnaval. He was a founder of the União Brasileira de Compositores and director of the Brazilian Society of Authors, Composers, and Writers of Music. He died in Rio de Janeiro in 1958, a victim of lung cancer.

The official name of Macaé Airport had been previously named after Lacerda, but was changed in 2022 to Joaquim de Azevedo Mancebo Airport, after the founder of the local air club.

== Main successes ==
- A jardineira, with Humberto Porto - Orlando Silva (1939)
- A Lapa, with Herivelto Martins - Francisco Alves (1949)
- Acerta o passo, with Pixinguinha (1949)
- Acorda, escola de samba!, with Herivelto Martins - Sílvio Caldas (1937)
- Acho-te uma graça, with Carvalhinho and Haroldo Lobo - César de Alencar & Heleninha Costa (1952)
- Ainda me recordo, with Pixinguinha (1947)
- Aliança partida, with Roberto Martins - Orlando Silva (1937)
- Amigo infiel, with Aldo Cabral - Orlando Silva (1938)
- Amigo leal, with Aldo Cabral - Orlando Silva (1937)
- Boneca, with Aldo Cabral - Sílvio Caldas (1935)
- Brasil, with Aldo Cabral - Francisco Alves & Dalva de Oliveira (1939)
- Carnaval da minha vida, with Aldo Cabral - Francisco Alves (1942)
- Cheguei, with Pixinguinha (1946)
- Chorei, with Pixinguinha (1942)
- Coitado do Edgar!, with Haroldo Lobo - Linda Batista (1945)
- Despedida de Mangueira, with Aldo Cabral - Francisco Alves (1939)
- Devagar e sempre, with Pixinguinha (1949)
- Dinorá, with José Ferreira Ramos (1935)
- Duvi-d-o-dó, with João Barcellos - Carmen Miranda (1936)
- E o vento levou, with Herivelto Martins - Bando da Lua (1940)
- Ele e eu, with Pixinguinha (1946)
- Espanhola, with Haroldo Lobo - Aracy de Almeida (1946)
- Espelho do destino, with Aldo Cabral - Orlando Silva (1939)
- Eva querida, with Luiz Vassalo - Mário Reis (1935)
- Falta um zero no meu ordenado, with Ary Barroso - Francisco Alves (1948)
- Fica doido varrido, with Eratóstenes Frazão - Sílvio Caldas (1945)
- Ingênuo, with Pixinguinha (1946)
- Lero-lero, with Eratóstenes Frazão - Orlando Silva (1941)
- Naquele tempo, with Pixinguinha (1946)
- Normalista, with David Nasser - Nelson Gonçalves (1949)
- Número um, with Mário Lago - Orlando Silva (1939)
- O gato e o canário, with Pixinguinha (1949)
- Os oito batutas, with Pixinguinha (1947)
- Pedro, Antônio e João, with Oswaldo Santiago - Dalva de Oliveira (1940)
- Pombo-correio, with Darcy de Oliveira - Gilberto Alves(1942)
- Proezas de Solon, with Pixinguinha (1946)
- Professora, with Jorge Faraj - Sílvio Caldas (1938)
- Querido Adão, with Oswaldo Santiago - Carmen Miranda (1936)
- Sabiá de Mangueira, with Eratóstenes Frazão - Nelson Gonçalves (1944)
- Segura ele, with Pixinguinha (1946)
- Seresteiro, with Pixinguinha (1946)
- Seu Lourenço no vinho, with Pixinguinha (1948)
- Sofres porque queres, with Pixinguinha (1946)
- Soluços, with Pixinguinha (1949)
- Um a zero, with Pixinguinha (1946)
- Um caboclo abandonado (Rolinha triste), with Herivelto Martins - Sílvio Caldas (1936)
- Urubatã, with Pixinguinha (1946)
- Verão no Havaí, with Haroldo Lobo - Francisco Alves (1944)
- Voltei pro morro, with Darcy de Oliveira - Ademilde Fonseca (1942)
- Vou vivendo, with Pixinguinha (1946)
