= Dircinha Batista =

Brazilian actress and singer (1922–1999)

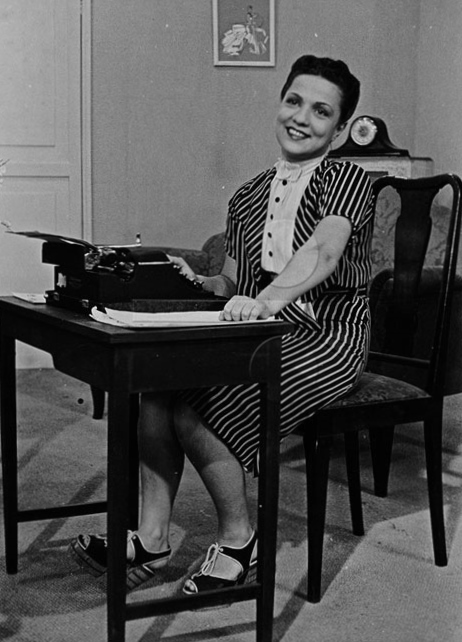
- Dircinha Batista in Banana da Terra (1939)
- Born: Dirce Grandino de Oliveira; April 7, 1922; São Paulo, Brazil
- Died: June 18, 1999 (aged 77); Rio de Janeiro, Brazil
- Resting place: São João Batista Cemetery, Rio de Janeiro, Brazil
- Occupations: Singer, actress
- Years active: 1928–1966

Dirce Grandino de Oliveira (April 7, 1922 – June 18, 1999), known as Dircinha Batista, was a Brazilian actress and singer.

== Biography ==
Daughter of the singer, composer and ventriloquist Batista Júnior and sister of Linda Batista, Dircinha Batista was a very successful Brazilian singer. In a career of more than forty years she recorded over three hundred 78 rpm discs with many big hits, especially Carnaval songs. She worked in sixteen Brazilian movies and was a child prodigy. Dircinha began performing at festivals at age six. She began to participate in her father's shows in Rio de Janeiro and São Paulo beginning in 1928.

Dircinha and her sister Linda Batista became famous while still young and soon won the admiration of the then-president Getúlio Vargas, who considered the Batista sisters a "national heritage". She became RCA Victor's leading seller over the 1940s and 1950s. In the '60s at the height of her career, Dircinha was already struggling with depression and was hospitalized in clinics and sanatoriums.

At age 13, Dircinha made the film Hello, Hello Brazil! directed by Wallace Downey and the following year in Hello, Hello, Carnival! produced by Adhemar Gonzaga, another great success at the time of chanchadas. Her singing career took off after Francisco Alves presented her on his program on Radio Cajuti as "the girl with the throat of a bird". She was named "Queen of Radio" in 1948.

In 1930 at age eight, she recorded her first record for Columbia featuring two Batista Júnior compositions, "Borboleta Azul" and "Dircinha". In 1931, she joined Francisco Alves' program on Rádio Cajuti, where she worked until she was ten, then moving to Rádio Clube do Brasil. In 1933 she recorded "A Órfã" and "Anjo Enfermo" by Cândido das Neves accompanied by the composer on guitar, together with Tute. In 1937, Benedito Lacerda invited her to record his samba "Não Chora" with him as a soloist (with Darci de Oliveira). After the recording, not knowing what to use on the other side of the record, he asked Nássara (who was in the studio) for one of his songs. Nássara had an unfinished march, then finished it and Dircinha recorded his first big hit, "Periquitinho Verde", which exploded at Carnaval the following year. In 1938 she worked in the films "Futebol em Família", "Bombonzinho" and "Banana da Terra", and in Belo Horizonte won a "best singer" award from Governor Benedito Valadares. She recorded "Tirolesa", one of the great hits of the 1939 Carnival, and won a contest promoted by the newspaper O Globo to choose the favorite singer of the federal capital. In the same year she had other hits including "Moleque Teimoso", "Era Só o Que Lackava", "Mamãe, Eu Vi um Touro".

In 1940, Batista participated in the film "Laranja da China" and found success with "Upa, Upa", "Nunca Mais" (both by Ary Barroso), "Acredite Quem Quiser" and "Inimigo do Batente", as well as the 1940 Carnaval song "Katucha". The same year, she signed a lucrative contract with Radio Ipanema and made her first international tour (to Argentina). In 1941 she was in the film "Entra na Farra" and three years later, "Abacaxi Azul", and in 1947, "Fogo na Canjica". In 1945 she had a hit with "Eu Quero É Sambar". In 1948 she won the "Rainha do Rádio" (Queen of Radio) contest of the Brazilian Radio Association. In 1953, she acted in theater for the second and last time (the first was in 1952) and had one of her biggest hits with "Se Eu Morresse Amanhã de Manhã". She had a hit at the 1958 Carnaval with "Mamãe, Eu Levei Bomba". Her films in this period included "Carnaval em Caxias" (1954}, "Guerra ao Samba" (1955), "Tira a Mão Dá" and "Depois Eu Conto" (both 1956), "Metido a Bacana" (1957), " É de Chuá" (1958) and "Mulheres à Vista" (1959). She signed a contract with TV Tupi in 1961 and had success in 1964 with "A Índia Vai Ter Neném". Shaken by her mother's death, Batista stopped singing in 1970.

In the late 1990s, the musical "Somos Irmãs" (We're Sisters) was released, starring Nicette Bruno and Suely Franco, which tells the life story of the sister singers.

Isolated by her mother and never having married, Dircinha closed herself off from the world in 1974 and would remain secluded in her apartment in Copacabana, in the care of her sister Linda. In her last years she was hospitalized at the Mercedes Miranda Gerontological Center at Casa de Saúde Dr. Eiras, in Botafogo. Dircinha died of cardiac arrest on April 18, 1999, at the age of 77 at the São Lucas Hospital; her body was laid to rest in the chapel of the São João Batista cemetery.

== Filmography ==
- Alô, Alô, Brasil (1935)
- Alô, Alô Carnaval (1936)
- João Ninguém (1936)
- Bombonzinho (1937)
- Futebol Em Família (1938)
- Banana da Terra (1939)
- Onde estás, Felicidade? (1939)
- Laranja da China (1940)
- Entra Na Farra (1941)
- Abacaxi Azul (1944)
- Não Adianta Chorar (1945)
- Fogo Na Canjica (1947)
- Esta É Fina! (1948)
- Folias Cariocas (1948)
- Eu Quero É Movimento (1949)
- Carnaval No Fogo (1949)
- Carnaval No Fogo (1949)
- É Fogo na Roupa (1952)
- Carnaval Em Caxias (1953)
- Guerra ao Samba (1955)
- Tira a Mão Daí! (1956)
- Depois Eu Conto (1956)
- Metido a Bacana (1957)
- É de Chuá! (1958)
- Mulheres à Vista (1959)
- Entrei de Gaiato (1959)
- O Viúvo Alegre (1960)
- Carnaval Barra Limpa (1967)
- 007 e Meio No Carnaval (1966)
- Cantoras do Rádio (2009) (Documentary, footage archives)
