= Linda Batista =

Brazilian musician

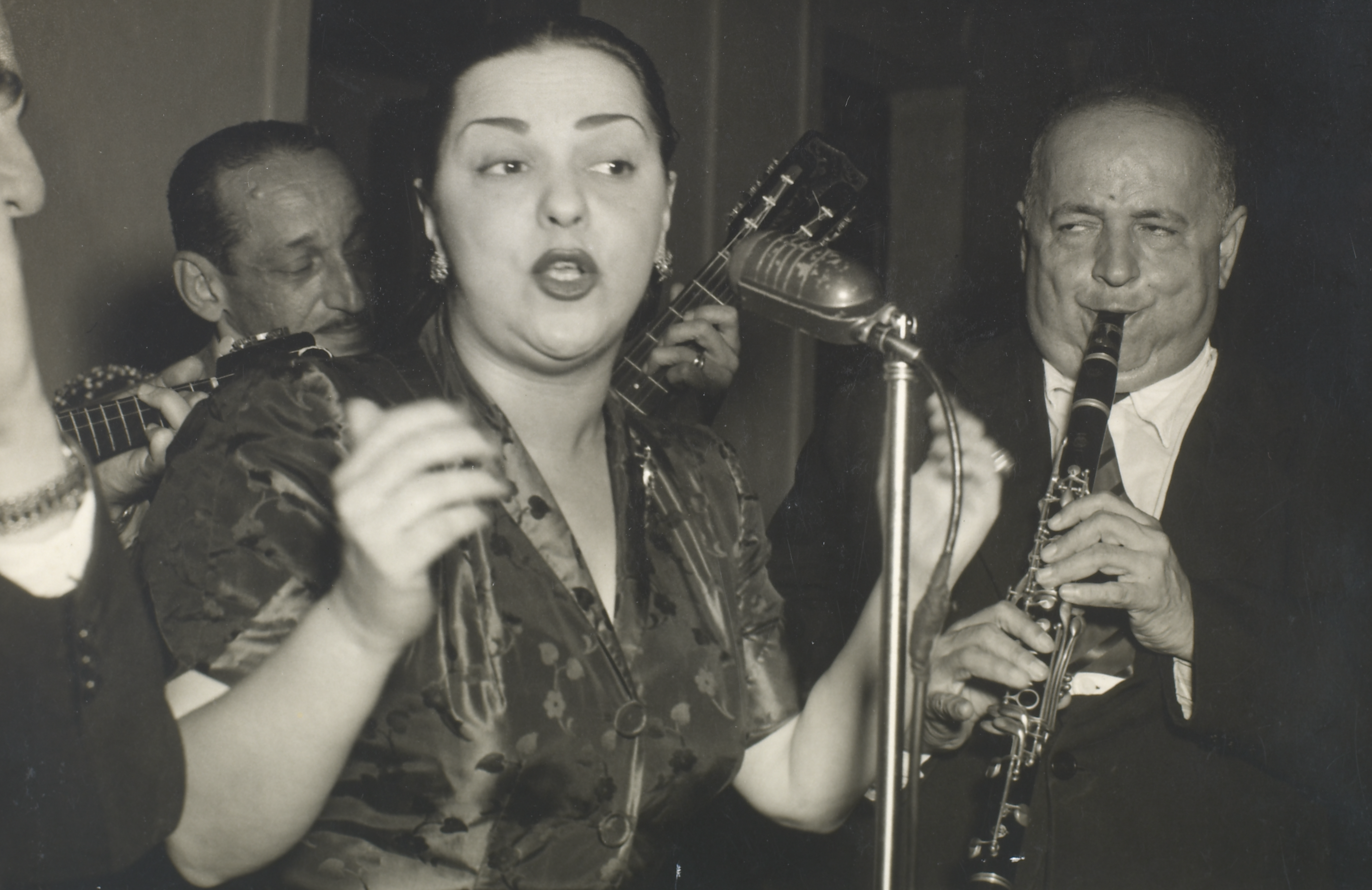
Linda Batista, 1952.

Linda Batista, born Florinda Grandino de Oliveira (June 14, 1919 – April 18, 1988) was a Brazilian popular musician.

== Biography ==
Linda was born in São Paulo, the sister of Dircinha Batista. She studied violão (classical guitar) from age 12 under Patrício Teixeira. She was hired at Radio Cajuti (later Rádio Mundial) in Rio de Janeiro after substituting for her sister on composer Gastão Lamounier's show in 1932. By 1937 she had been named Brazil's Rainha do Rádio in a contest voted on by listeners, a title first held by Carmen Miranda. Batista married and quickly divorced in the late 1930s. Her first recordings were released in 1938. Around this time she also began appearing in films such as Maridinho de Luxo and Banana da Terra.

She sang on Rádio Cultura Brasil in São Paulo and then appeared at Casino São Vicente on Ilha Porchat for six months. She returned to Rio de Janeiro in 1939 and was hired at the Cassino da Urca, singing with the Kolman Orchestra. She remained there until the casinos were closed in 1945 by state decree. She signed to Victor Records in 1940, and would record for the label until her retirement in 1960. Batista toured throughout Brazil in the early and mid-1940s, scoring many nationwide hits such as "Tudo é Brasil" (1941), "Batuque No Morro" (1941), "Clube Dos Barrigudos" (1944), "No Boteco Do José" (1946), "Enlouqueci" (1948), "Nega Maluca" (1950), and "Vingança" (1951).

Batista did extensive work for films throughout the 1950s. In 1951, she embarked on a tour of Portugal, France, and Italy. She toured Uruguay in 1957-58 and Argentina in 1959. She appeared in a variety show with Carlos Machado's orchestra at his Rio nightclub Night and Day in 1960, and retired from active performance that year.

== Hits ==
Linda Batista, 1960's.

- A pátria está te chamando, Grande Otelo (1943)
- Amor passageiro, Jorge Abdalla & Zé Kéti (1952)
- Bis, maestro, bis!, Cristóvão de Alencar & J. Maia (1940)
- Bambu, Fernando Lobo & Manezinho Araújo (1951)
- Batuque no morro, Russo do Pandeiro & Sá Róris (1941)
- Bom dia, Aldo Cabral & Herivelto Martins - as Três Marias (1942)
- Calúnia, Lupicínio Rodrigues & Rubens Santos (1958)
- Chico Viola, Nássara & Wilson Batista - c/Trio Madrigal (1953)
- Coitado do Edgar, Benedito Lacerda & Haroldo Lobo (1945)
- Criado com vó, Marambá (1946)
- Da Central a Belém, Chiquinho Sales (1943)
- Dona Divergência, Felisberto Martins & Lupicínio Rodrigues (1951)
- Enlouqueci, João Sales, Luiz Soberano & Valdomiro Pereira (1948)
- Eu fui à Europa, Chiquinho Sales (1941)
- Foi assim, Lupicínio Rodrigues (1952)
- Levou fermento, Monsueto (1956)
- Madalena, Ari Macedo & Airton Amorim (1951)
- Marcha do paredão, Armando Cavalcanti & Klécius Caldas (1961)
- Me deixa em paz, Airton Amorim & Monsueto (1952)
- Meu pecado, não, Fernando Lobo & Paulo Soledade (1953)
- Migalhas, Felisberto Martins & Lupicínio Rodrigues (1950)
- Nega maluca, Ewaldo Ruy & Fernando Lobo (1950)
- No boteco do José, Augusto Garcez & Wilson Batista (1945)
- O maior samba do mundo, David Nasser & Herivelto Martins - w/Nelson Gonçalves (1958)
- Ó abre alas!, Chiquinha Gonzaga - w/Dircinha Batista (1971)
- Palavra de honra, Armando Fernandes & Carolina Cardoso de Menezes (1955)
- Prece de um sambista, Billy Blanco (1952)
- Quem gosta de passado é museu, herself with Jorge de Castro (1964)
- Quero morrer no carnaval, Luiz Antônio & Eurico Campos (1961)
- Risque, Ary Barroso - w/Trio Surdina (1953)
- Stanislau Ponte Preta, Altamiro Carrilho & Miguel Gustavo (1959)
- Trapo de gente, Ary Barroso - w/Trio Surdina (1953)
- Tudo é Brasil, Sá Róris & Vicente Paiva (1941)
- Valsinha do Turi-turé, Custódio Mesquita & Evaldo Rui (1945)
- Vingança, Lupicínio Rodrigues (1951)
- Volta, Lupicínio Rodrigues (1957)

== Filmography ==
- Alô, Alô, Carnaval (1936)
- Maridinho de Luxo (1938)
- Banana da Terra (1939)
- Céu Azul (1940)
- Tristezas Não Pagam Dívidas (1943)
- Samba em Berlim (1943)
- Abacaxi Azul (1944)
- Berlin to the Samba Beat (1944)
- Não Adianta Chorar (1945)
- Caídos do Céu (1946)
- Não Me Digas Adeus (1947)
- Folias Cariocas (1948)
- Esta É Fina (1948)
- Fogo na Canjica (1948)
- Pra Lá de Boa (1949)
- Eu Quero É Movimento (1949)
- Um Beijo Roubado (1950)
- Agüenta Firme, Isidoro (1951)
- Tudo Azul (1952)
- Está com Tudo (1952)
- É Fogo na Roupa (1952)
- Carnaval em Caxias (1954)
- O Petróleo É Nosso (1954)
- Carnaval em Marte (1955)
- Tira a Mão Daí (1956)
- Depois Eu Conto (1956)
- Metido a Bacana (1957)
- É de Chuá (1958)
- Mulheres à Vista (1959)
- Virou Bagunça (1960)

== General references ==
- Linda Batista at Allmusic
