= Afrodísio de Castro =

Brazilian cinematographer

- Born: 1893; São Félix, Bahia, Brazil
- Died: 1975 (aged 81–82)
- Other name: A.P Castro
- Occupation: Cinematographer
- Years active: 1931-1965 (film)

Afrodísio Pereira de Castro (1893–1975) was a Brazilian cinematographer who worked on more than fifty films during his career. Occasionally he also worked as a sound recordist or a film editor.

== Selected filmography ==
- Ganga Bruta (1933)
- Hello, Hello Brazil! (1935)
- Hello, Hello, Carnival! (1936)
- Samba in Berlin (1943)
- Berlin to the Samba Beat (1944)

== Bibliography ==
- Flórido, Eduardo Giffoni. Great characters in the history of Brazilian cinema. Fraiha, 1999.
