= Stellinha Egg =

Brazilian musician

Stella Maria Egg, baptismal name of Stellinha Egg (July 18, 1914 – June 17, 1991), was a Brazilian singer and composer.

She was married to maestro Lindolfo Gaya and musical partner of Luiz Gonzaga, Dorival Caymmi, Sílvio Caldas, among others.

== Career ==
Stella Maria Egg was born in Curitiba on July 18, 1914. The daughter of Carlos Egg and Estela Campos Egg, Stellinha (an affective diminutive of Stella) was one of the most well known singer-composers in the country. Her interest in music came front her family: she sang together with her siblings on family gatherings, while her father played the flute and her mother the mandolin. When she was five, she began singing at the Presbyterian Church.

Her career began at Rádio Clube Paranaense, where she was hired by Rádio Tupi in São Paulo, after winning a performance contest. During the 1940s and 1950s, she sang at Rádio Tupi in Rio de Janeiro. In 1945, she married maestro and pianist Lindolfo Gaya who then became responsible for her musical arrangements. He wrote one of the songs she sang, "Um amor para amar". In the 1950s she was elected three times as the best performer in Brazilian folk music.

After receiving the Golden Record from the radio and news organization Globo, she went on a European tour, where she successfully presented herself on countries such as Portugal, Russia, Poland, Ukraine, France and Italy. She made partnerships with great names from Brazilian Popular Music, like Luiz Gonzaga, Dorival Caymmi and Silvio Caldas and its main compositions are "A moda da carranquinha", "Boi barroso", "Cablocla Jandira", "Cantar da minha terra", "Cantigas do meu Brasil" and "Fandango".

After her husband died in the 80s, she returned to Curitiba, leaving behind their concerts. She died in Curitiba on June 17, 1991, when she was 77 years old.

== Discography ==
- Uma lua no céu....outra lua no mar/Tapioquinha de coco (1944)
- Lamento negro/Terra seca (1949)
- Catolé/Bum-qui-ti-bum (1950)
- O vizinho é do contra/Menino dos olhos tristes (1950)
- Pregão/Sá Dona (1951)
- O canto de Iara/Prenda minha (1951)
- Fandango/Não consigo esquecer você (1952)
- Mais ninguém/Toca sanfoneiro (1952)
- Quem sabe?/Tão bom que está (1952)
- Canção de Natal/Ano Novo (1952)
