= Edgar Brasil =

Brazilian cinematographer

- Born: 1902; Hamburg, German Empire
- Died: 4 January 1954 (aged 51–52); Cruzeiro, São Paulo, Brazil
- Other name: Edgar Hauschildt
- Occupation: Cinematographer
- Years active: 1928-1954 (film)

Edgar Brasil (1902–1954) was a German-born Brazilian cinematographer. He worked on more than 50 productions during his career.

== Selected filmography ==
- Limite (1931)
- Estudantes (1935)
- Hello, Hello Brazil! (1935)
- Hello, Hello, Carnival! (1936)
- Banana da Terra (1939)
- Minas Conspiracy (1948)

== Bibliography ==
- Shaw, Lisa & Dennison, Stephanie. Brazilian National Cinema. Routledge, 2014.
