= Carioca Maravilhosa =

1936 film directed by Luiz de Barros

- Directed by: Luiz de Barros
- Written by: Luiz de Barros
- Produced by: Sebastião Santos
- Starring: Carlos Vivan; Nina Marina; Pedro Dias
- Cinematography: A.P. Castro
- Production company: Cinédia
- Distributed by: DFB
- Release date: 11 June 1936 (Brazil)
- Country: Brazil
- Language: Portuguese

Carioca Maravilhosa is a 1935 Brazilian film directed by Luiz de Barros and starring Carlos Vivan and Nina Marina.

== Cast ==
- Carlos Vivan ... The Argentinian
- Nina Marina ... Nina
- Pedro Dias ... Comendador Almeida
- José Figueiredo ... (as J. Figueiredo)
- Américo Garrido ... Locutor
- Alba Lopes ... Blonde
- Mary Lopes ... Brunette
- Edmundo Maia ... Nina's uncle
