= Ademilde Fonseca =

Brazilian Choro singer

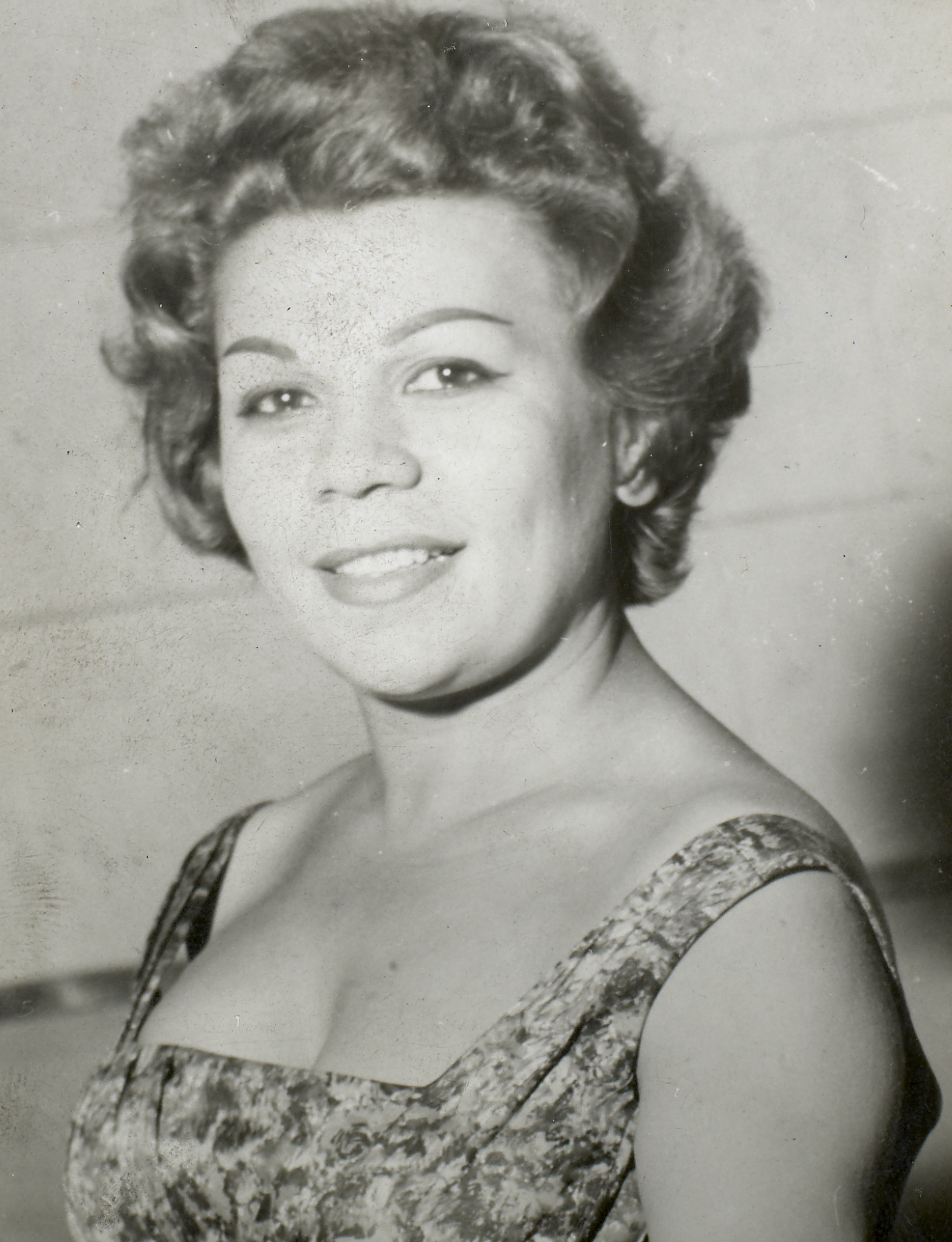
- Ademilde Fonseca in 1959
- Born: March 4, 1921; São Gonçalo do Amarante, Rio Grande do Norte
- Died: March 27, 2012 (aged 91); Rio de Janeiro
- Occupation: Singer

Ademilde Fonseca (nicknamed Queen of Chorinho; March 4, 1921 – March 27, 2012) was a Brazilian Choro singer, a genre of music that fuses popular European music and the music of African slaves.

== Biography ==
Ademilde Fonseca was popularly known as the "Queen of Chorinho". She was born on March 4, 1921, in Pirituba area of São Gonçalo do Amarante, Rio Grande do Norte in the Northeast Region of Brazil. She died of a heart attack on March 27, 2012, in Rio de Janeiro, Brazil. at the age of 91 Fonseca produced 6 albums in her lifetime that sold more than 500,000 copies.

Fonseca is noted as the originator of the Choro music, a genre that blends the sound of popular European music (polka and waltz) and the music of African slaves.

Fonseca grew up in Natal, where she performed early and married the musician Naldimar Gedeão Delfim. In 1941, the couple moved to Rio and Fonseca appeared in Renato Murce's show Papel Carbono. The following year she had a first hit with Tico-tico no Fuba with the band of Benedito Lacerda. In 1943 she recorded Apanhei-te, cavaquinho and Urubu Malandro, which led to a successful career as a singer. In 1944 she got a contract with the radio station Rádio Tupi in Rio de Janeiro, and worked for more than 10 years at the station. In 1945 she played the polka Rato, Rato, which is considered a classic of the Choro genre and earned her the title "Rainha do Choro", or the Queen of Choro.

== Discography ==
1. Brasileirinho (1952)
