= André Filho =

Brazilian actor and musician

- Born: Antônio André de Sá Filho; 21 March 1906
- Origin: Rio de Janeiro, Brazil
- Died: 2 July 1974 (aged 68) Rio de Janeiro
- Genres: Samba
- Occupations: Actor, musician and composer
- Instruments: Violinist, mandolin, banjo, guitarist, pianist, and singer

Antônio André de Sá Filho, known as André Filho (21 March 1906 – 2 July 1974) was a Brazilian actor, violinist, mandolinist, banjo player, guitarist, pianist, composer and singer. He worked with some of Brazil's most notable performers of the 1930s including Carmen Miranda, Mário Reis and Noel Rosa.

== Recordings ==
- 1930 - Mamãezinha está dormindo
- 1930 - Eu quero casar com você
- 1930 - O meu amor tem
- 1930 - Quando a noite desce (with Roberto Borges)
- 1932 - Mulato de qualidade
- 1931 - Bamboleô
- 1933 - Alô... Alô?
- 1933 - Filosofia (with Noel Rosa)
- 1934 - Cidade Maravilhosa
- 1935 - S.O.S.
- 1937 - Baiana do tabuleiro
- 1937 - Primavera da vida (with Almanyr Grego)
- 1941 - Cinzas no coração

== Literature ==
- ALBIN, Ricardo Cravo (Criação e Supervisão Geral). Dicionário Houaiss Ilustrado da Música Popular Brasileira. Rio de Janeiro: Paracatu, 2006.
- MORAIS JUNIOR, Luis Carlos de. O Sol nasceu pra todos:a História Secreta do Samba. Rio de Janeiro: Litteris, 2011.
