= Hello, Hello Brazil! =

1935 film directed by Wallace Downey

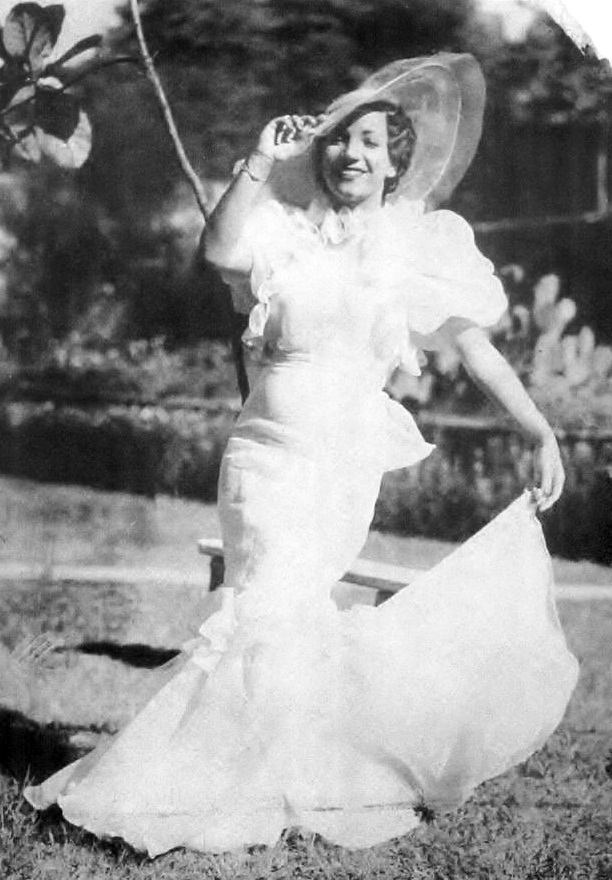
- Carmen Miranda in Hello, Hello Brazil!
- Directed by: Wallace Downey; Alberto Ribeiro; João de Barro
- Written by: Alberto Ribeiro; João de Barro
- Produced by: Wallace Downey; Adhemar Gonzaga
- Cinematography: Edgar Brasil; A.P. Castro; Luiz de Barros; Ramon García; Antonio Medeiros; Fausto Muniz
- Edited by: A.P. Castro
- Production company: Cinédia
- Release date: February 4, 1935
- Running time: 1 hr. 18 min.
- Country: Brazil
- Language: Portuguese

Hello, Hello Brazil! (Portuguese: Allô, Allô, Brasil!) is a 1935 Brazilian musical film directed by Wallace Downey, Alberto Ribeiro, and João de Barro. It stars Carmen Miranda and Adhemar Gonzaga; the latter also produced the film. The screenplay was written by Alberto Ribeiro and João de Barro.

== Cast ==
- Almirante
- Ary Barroso
- Aurora Miranda
- Carmen Miranda
- Adhemar Gonzaga
- César Ladeira
- Virgínia Lane
- Francisco Alves
- Mário Reis
- Ivo Astolphi ... as Bando da Lua
- Dircinha Batista
- Simão Boutman
- Sílvio Caldas
- Chico Chico
- Apolo Correia
- Elisa Coelho de Almeida

== Production ==
Wallace Downey began his career producing successful musical films for Americans with established artists from Brazilian radio. Carmen Miranda, star of this 1935 film, was one such star. A co-production between Waldown Filmes and Cinédia, Allô, Allô, Brasil! presented a multitude of singers, comedians and radio presenters, such as vocalists Francisco Alves and Mário Reis.

A close tie-in with the radio world manifested in this films storyline. Written by popular composers duo João de Barros and Alberto Ribeiro, it portrayed the adventures of a "radiomaníaco" who falls for a nonexistent radio singer.

The two genres of music synonymous with the carnival, including the samba and the Marchinha, had a prominent place in early Brazilian musicals and popular movies.
