= Cidade Maravilhosa =

Song by Aurora Miranda
- Released: 1935
- Genre: march
- Songwriter: André Filho

"Cidade maravilhosa" (Portuguese pronunciation: [siˈdadʒi maɾaviˈʎɔzɐ], Marvelous City) is a march that was written and composed by André Filho and arranged by Silva Sobreira for the Rio de Janeiro carnival in 1935. It has since become the anthem for the city of Rio de Janeiro. In the same year, Aurora Miranda recorded a sung version of the song that became extremely popular.

The name of Rio, however, does not appear in the song. Cidade Maravilhosa as a nickname for the city of Rio de Janeiro was coined by the writer Coelho Neto from the north-eastern Brazilian state of Maranhão as a tribute to the city's natural beauty. He had lived there briefly as a child and for much of his later life.

Its title was also inspired by a highly successful radio program of the time, presented by César Ladeira. The anthem was popularized by Carmen Miranda and was declared the "official song of Brazil's new state of Guanabara" in 1960, after being converted into a samba.
