= Cinédia =

Brazilian film studio

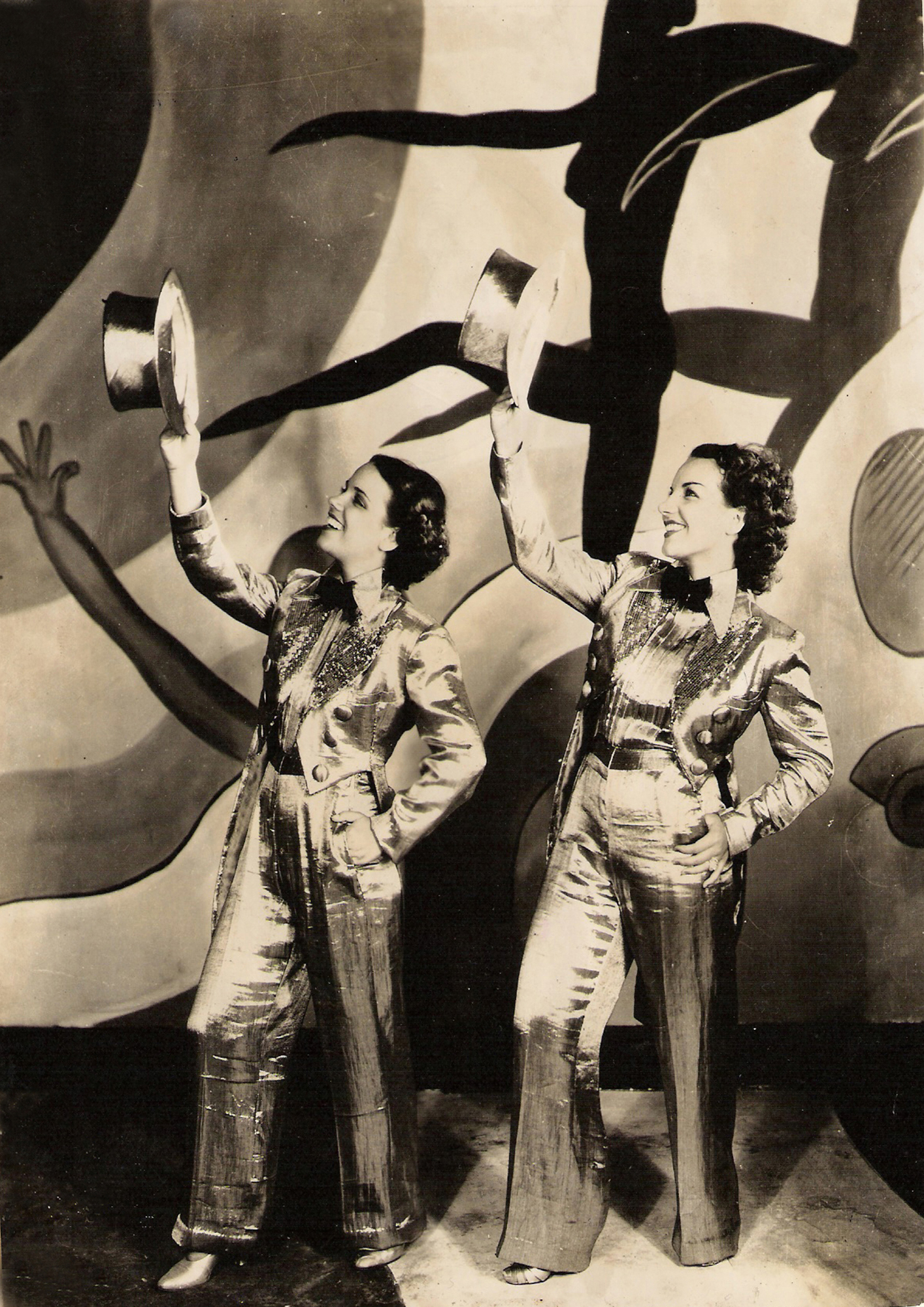
- Industry: Film
- Founded: March 15, 1930; 96 years ago
- Founders: Adhemar Gonzaga
- Defunct: 1951; 75 years ago
- Headquarters: São Cristovão, Rio de Janeiro
- Key people: Alice Gonzaga
- Products: Motion pictures
- Website: www.cinedia.com.br

Cinédia (originally called the Cinearte studios) was a Brazilian film studio established on 15 March 1930 in Rio de Janeiro, and remained in continual operation until 1951.

Between 1930 and 1945, Cinédia averaged two films a year, with a high of five in 1936.

== History ==
One of the most important production companies of Brazilian film industry in the 1930s and 1940s, idealized by Adhemar Gonzaga, which produced popular dramas and musical comedies, known by the generic denomination "chanchadas".

Importing the latest equipment and technology, such as Mitchell cameras, and the Movietone sound system, in the first Brazilian film with optical sound.

Humberto Mauro produced the company's first film, Lábios sem Beijos, in 1930. In 1933, he directed, with Adhemar Gonzaga, A Voz do Carnaval, in which singer Carmen Miranda made one of her first film appearances.

In musical comedies like Alô, Alô Brasil!, Alô, Alô, Carnaval! and Onde estás, felicidade?, actors like Oscarito, Grande Otelo and Dercy Gonçalves made their debut.

Cinédia's biggest success was O Ébrio, in 1946, produced by Adhemar Gonzaga and directed by Gilda de Abreu.

Other of the company's hits were Bonequinha de Seda in 1936, Estudantes in 1935, Ganga Bruta in 1933, and Limite in 1931.

== Partial filmography ==
- Mulher (1931)
- Honra e Ciúmes (1933)
- Tapirapés (1934)
- Alô, Alô Brasil! (1935)
- Noites Cariocas (1935)
- Carioca Maravilhosa (1935)
- Estudantes (1935)
- Alô, Alô, Carnaval! (1936)
- O Jovem Tataravô (1936)
- Bonequinha de Seda (1936)
- Caçando Feras (1936)
- O Descobrimento do Brasil (1937)
- Samba da Vida (1937)
- Alma e Corpo de uma Raça (1938)
- Aruanã (1938)
- Maridinho de Luxo (1938)
- Tererê Não Resolve (1938)
- Está Tudo Aí (1939)
- Joujoux e Balangandãs (1939)
- Onde Estás Felicidade? (1939)
- Direito de Pecar (1940)
- Eterna Esperança (1940)
- Pureza (1940)
- 24 Horas de Sonho (1941)
- O Dia é Nosso (1941)
- A Sedução do Garimpo (1941)
- It's All True (1942) (unfinished version)
