= Honra e Ciúmes =

1933 film

Honra e ciúmes
- Directed by: Antonio Tibiriçá
- Written by: Antonio Tibiriçá
- Produced by: Antonio Tibiriçá
- Starring: Antonio Sorrentino; Amanda Leilop
- Cinematography: Humberto Mauro; Antonio Medeiros
- Production companies: Íris Filmes; Estúdio Cinédia S.A.
- Distributed by: Cinédia
- Release date: 3 July 1933
- Country: Brazil
- Language: Portuguese

Honra e Ciúmes is a 1933 Brazilian film directed by Antonio Tibiriçá. It is believed to be a lost film.

== Cast ==
- Antonio Sorrentino ... The Defendant
- Amanda Leilop ... The Victim
- Antonio Tibiriçá ... The Lawyer
- Leandro Freitas ... The Baritone
- Anita Sabatini Sorrentino ... The Soprano
- Tamar Moema ... Girl in Love
- Carlos Eugênio ... Young Man in Love
- Paulo Marra ... The Butler
- Otto Sachs ... Escrivão
- Alfredo Nunes ... The Judge
- Adhemar Gonzaga ... Juror with Spectacles
- Pery Ribas ... Juror
- Victor Ciacchi ... Juror
- Carmo Nacarato ... Bitt
- Maestro Vivas ... The Conductor
