= Mario Reis (physicist) =

Physicist

Mario Reis is a physicist, researcher and lecturer at Fluminense Federal University. He is a specialist in magnetism, more precisely on molecular magnetism, magnetocaloric effect, nanomagnetism and other related topics. On these themes, he has published over a hundred scientific papers. supervised dozens of graduate students and post-docs; and published two books:

- Mario Reis and A. Moreira dos Santos, Magnetismo Molecular, Livraria da Física, 192 pgs (2010)
- Mario Reis, Fundamentals of Magnetism, Elsevier, 297 pgs (2013).

Since 2016 he has been an editor of Physica B: Condensed Matter, an international journal published by Elsevier.
