= Rádio Mayrink Veiga =

Rio de Janeiro; Brazil
- Frequency: 1220 KHz

Programming
- Language: Portuguese

History
- First air date: January 26, 1926

Rádio Mayrink Veiga was a radio station in Rio de Janeiro, Brazil. It began broadcasting on January 21, 1926, and was closed in 1965 by the military dictatorship which ruled Brazil at that time. Rádio Mayrink Veiga was a key part of the Radio Era (Era do Rádio) in Brazil. It was the second station which established advertising and entertainment broadcasts in Brazil, after Rádio Record, from São Paulo. Radio Mayrink Veiga was one of the most important stations operating in Brazil for the next three decades, and created many stars. Carmen Miranda and her sister Aurora had their debut on Radio Mayrink Veiga, as did the Pagã Sisters, Elvira and Rosina. In 1962, Rádio Mayrink Veiga participated in the protest broadcasts of the Cadeia da Legalidade (Rule of Law Network), a network of radio stations organized to oppose the military dictatorship and support democracy. Ana Montenegro was one of the featured broadcasters on the station from 1959 to 1963. The station's participation was the pretext for its permanent closure by the military regime in 1965.
