= Braguinha (composer) =

Brazilian songwriter

Background information
- Also known as: João de Barro
- Born: Carlos Alberto Ferreira Braga; March 29, 1907; Rio de Janeiro, Brazil
- Died: December 24, 2006 (aged 99) Rio de Janeiro, Brazil
- Genres: MPB, Samba, Marchinha
- Occupations: Songwriter, writer, producer, singer, screenwriter
- Instrument: Singer
- Years active: 1923–1985

Carlos Alberto Ferreira Braga (March 29, 1907 – December 24, 2006), commonly known as Braguinha ("Little Braga") or João de Barro ("the Hornero"), was a Brazilian songwriter and occasional singer.

== Life ==
He was born in Rio de Janeiro, where he lived all his life. Braga studied architecture in his youth, and, when he started to write songs, he adopted the pseudonym "João de Barro" (the name of a bird that builds elaborate mud nests), as his father wouldn't approve of seeing the family name associated with the world of samba and popular music, then on the fringes of society.

Braguinha is most famous for his Carnaval marchinhas (a genre of light-hearted songs related rhythmically to the military march). Many of those, some composed as early as the 1930s, have become standards of Brazilian popular music, being sung by revellers year after year during Carnaval celebrations. His marchinhas have been recorded by some of the best-known Carnaval singers of the 20th century, such as Carmen Miranda.

In 1937, Braguinha wrote the lyrics to "Carinhoso", composed by Pixinguinha twenty years earlier. The sophisticated samba-choro would become one of the most recorded songs in Brazilian musical history. Another beloved classic, the lyrical "Pastorinhas", was written in collaboration with legendary samba composer Noel Rosa.

He died on December 24, 2006, at the age of 99; the official cause of death was described as multiple organ failure caused by a general infection.

== Selected discography ==
- "Pra vancê"/"Coisas da roça" (1929) Parlophon 78
- "Desengano"/"Assombração" (1929) Parlophon 78
- "Salada" (1929) Parlophon" 78
- "Não quero amor nem carinho" (1930) Parlophon 78
- "Dona Antonha" (1930) Parlophon 78
- "Minha cabrocha"/"A mulher e a carroça" (1930) Parlophon 78
- "Quebranto" (1930) Parlophon 78
- "Mulata" (1931) Parlophon 78
- "Cor de prata"/"Nega" (1931) Parlophon 78
- "Tu juraste... eu jurei"/"Vou à Penha rasgado" (1931) Parlophon 78
- "Samba da boa vontade"/"Picilone" (1931) 13.344 78
- "O amor é um bichinho"/"Lua cheia" (1932) Parlophon 78
- "João de Barro" (1972) RCA Victor LP
- "Viva Braguinha" (1985) LP
- "João de Barro e Coisas Nossas" (1983) Funarte LP
- "Yes, nós temos Braguinha" (1998) Funarte/Atração CD
- "João de Barro (Braguinha) — Nasce um compositor" (1999) Revivendo CD
- "João de Barro – A música do século, por seus autores e intérpretes" (2000) Sesc São Paulo CD
