= Wallace Downey =

American film director

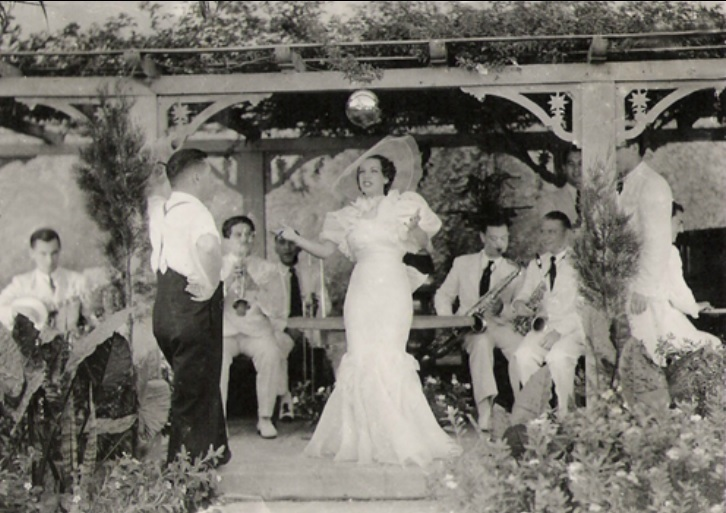
- Wallace Downey directing Carmen Miranda in Alô, Alô Brasil
- Born: 14 May 1902; Staten Island, New York City, New York, United States
- Died: 29 January 1978 (aged 75); New York City, New York, United States
- Occupations: Director, Producer

Wallace Downey (New York City, May 14, 1902 – New York City, January 29, 1978) was an American film producer and director.

In 1928 Wallace Downey, an executive of Columbia Records, was sent to South America to install a Brazilian branch for his company. He quickly realized Brazil was an entertainment hot bed for potential markets in records and films.

In 1931 Downey produced and directed, Coisas Nossas, the first successful Brazilian film with sound. His 1935 film, Hello, Hello Brazil!, first introduced radio singer and actress Carmen Miranda to a larger audience paving the way to her international fame at 20th Century Fox in the United States.

Downey later founded his own production company, Waldow S.A., in a partnership with Cinédia, producing musical films.

In 1938 Downey disbanded Waldow S.A., using the resources to create a new production company, Sonofilms.

== Selected filmography ==
=== Director ===
- Nossas Coisas (1931)
- Alô, Alô Brasil (1935)
- Estudantes (1935)

=== Producer ===
- Nossas Coisas (1931)
- Alô, Alô Brasil (1935)
- Estudantes (1935)
- Alô, Alô, Carnaval (1936)
- Banana da Terra (1936)
