= Noel Rosa =

Brazilian musician (1910–1937)

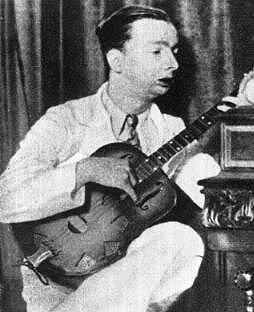

Background information
- Born: Noel de Medeiros Rosa; December 11, 1910; Rio de Janeiro, Brazil
- Died: May 4, 1937 (aged 26) Rio de Janeiro, Brazil
- Genres: Samba; marchinha
- Occupation: Singer-songwriter
- Instruments: Guitar; mandolin
- Years active: 1929–1937

Noel de Medeiros Rosa (December 11, 1910 – May 4, 1937) was a Brazilian singer-songwriter. One of the greatest names in Brazilian popular music, Noel gave a new twist to samba, combining its Afro-Brazilian roots with a more urban, witty language and making it a vehicle for ironic social commentary.

== Early life ==
Rosa was born in Rio de Janeiro into a middle-class family of the Vila Isabel neighbourhood. An accident with a forceps at his birth caused a disfigured chin. He learned to play the mandolin while still a teenager, and soon moved on to the guitar. Although Noel started medicine studies, he gave most of his attention to music and would spend whole nights in bars drinking and playing with other samba musicians.

== Career ==
Together with Braguinha and Almirante he formed the musical group Bando de Tangarás.

Soon he started composing sambas, and he had his breakthrough with "Com que roupa?", one of the biggest hits of 1931 and the first in a string of memorable compositions. Noel was a good friend of Cartola, who took care of him several times at his house on the Mangueira slum after some nights of heavy drinking. In the early 1930s Noel Rosa started to show signs of tuberculosis. He would occasionally leave for treatment in mountain resorts, but always ended up coming back to Rio and the nightlife.

== Personal life, death and legacy ==
In 1934, Rosa married Lindaura Martins, a seventeen-year-old neighbour, but that didn't keep him from having affairs with other women. Rosa was a heavy smoker, and most of his photographs show him with a cigarette hanging from his lower lip. By the later 1930s his health had seriously deteriorated, and he died of tuberculosis in 1937 at the age of 26.

On December 11, 2019, Google celebrated his 109th birthday with a Google Doodle.

A tunnel in the Vila Isabel neighborhood in Rio de Janeiro is named in his honor.

== Compositions ==
Noel Rosa wrote around 250 compositions, including:

- "A.E.I.O.U." (with Lamartine Babo, 1931)
- "Até amanhã" (1932)
- "Cem mil réis" (with Vadico, 1936)
- "Com que roupa?" (1929)
- "Conversa de botequim" (with Vadico, 1935)
- "Coração" (1932)
- "Cor de cinza" (1933)
- "Dama do cabaré" (1934)
- "De babado" (with João Mina, 1936)
- "De qualquer maneira" (with Ary Barroso)
- "É bom parar" (with Rubens Soares, 1936)
- "Feitiço da Vila" (with Vadico, 1936)
- "Feitio de oração" (with Vadico, 1933)
- "Filosofia" (with André Filho, 1933)
- "Fita amarela" (1932)
- "Gago apaixonado" (1930)
- "João Ninguém" (1935)
- "Minha viola" (1929)
- "Mulher indigesta"
- "Não tem tradução" (1933)
- "O orvalho vem caindo" (with Kid Pepe, 1933)
- "O sol nasceu pra todos" (1935)
- "O X do problema" (1936)
- "Palpite infeliz" (1934)
- "Para me livrar do mal" (with Ismael Silva, 1932)
- "Pastorinhas" (with João de Barro, 1934)
- "Pela décima vez" (1935)
- "Pierrô apaixonado" (with Heitor dos Prazeres, 1935)
- "Positivismo" (with Orestes Barbosa, 1933)
- "Pra que mentir" (with Vadico, 1937)
- "Provei" (with Vadico, 1936)
- "Quando o samba acabou (1933)
- "Quem dá mais?" (also known as "Leilão do Brasil) (1930)
- "Quem ri melhor" (1936)
- "São coisas nossas" (1936)
- "Século do progresso" (1936)
- "Tarzan, o filho do alfaiate" (1936)
- "Três apitos" (1933)
- "Último desejo" (1937)
- "Você só...mente" (with Hélio Rosa, 1933)
- "Mama de farinha" (with Hélio Rosa, 1943)

== Bibliography ==
- No Tempo de Noel Rosa. (Almirante)
- Noel Rosa: Uma Biografia. (João Máximo e Carlos Didier)
- Noel Rosa: Língua e Estilo (Castellar de Carvalho e Antonio Martins de Araujo)
- Songbook Noel Rosa 1, 2 e 3 (Almir Chediak)
- Noel Rosa: Para Ler e Ouvir (Eduardo Alcantara de Vasconcellos)
- O Jovem Noel Rosa (Guca Domenico)
- O Estudante do Coração (Lui Morais)
- O Sol nasceu pra todos, a história secreta do samba (Lui Morais)
- A Geração do Ouro Solar, Noel Rosa, Alquimia e Tarot (Lui Morais)
