= Lamartine Babo =

Brazilian composer

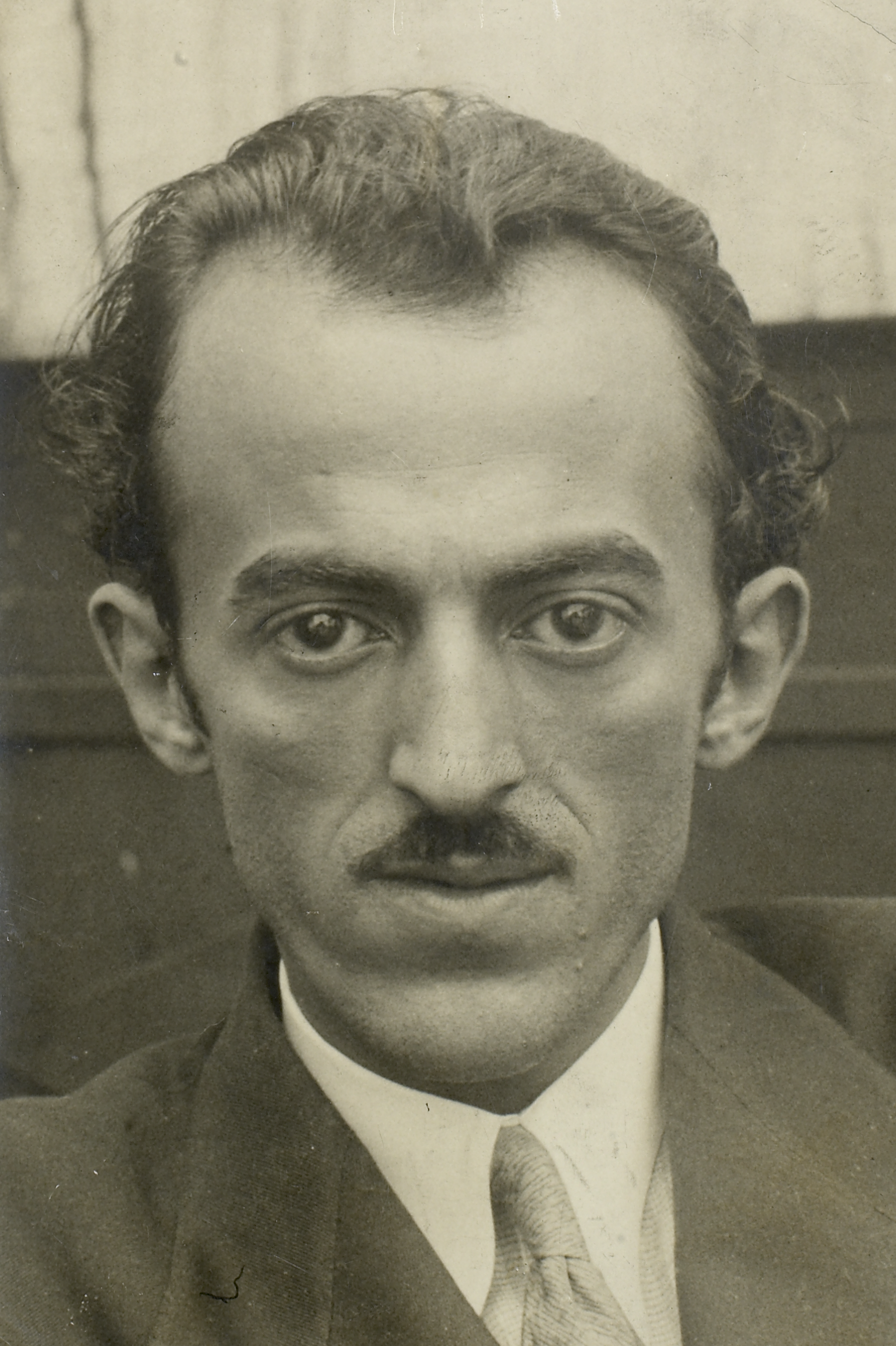

Background information
- Born: Lamartine Babo Azeredo; January 10, 1904; Rio de Janeiro, Brazil
- Died: June 16, 1963 (aged 59) Rio de Janeiro, Brazil
- Genres: Samba
- Occupations: Songwriter actor radio host producer journalist TV host

Lamartine Babo (10 January 1904 — 16 June 1963) was one of the most important popular composers of Brazil. He also appeared in four films.

== Career ==
Babo composed several satirical sambas, marchinhas and other songs.

Babo is especially remembered for composing anthems for all the main professional football clubs of Rio de Janeiro (América, Bangu, Bonsucesso, Botafogo, Canto do Rio, Flamengo, Fluminense, Madureira, Olaria, São Cristóvão, and Vasco da Gama).
