= Hello, Hello, Carnival! =

1936 film directed by Adhemar Gonzaga

Alô, Alô, Carnaval
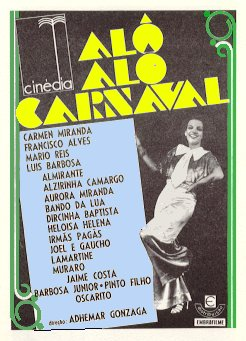
- A poster of the film showing the ensemble cast.
- Directed by: Adhemar Gonzaga
- Written by: Ruy Costa; Alberto Ribeiro; João de Barro; Adhemar Gonzaga
- Starring: Carmen Miranda
- Release date: 1936
- Running time: 61 minutes
- Country: Brazil
- Language: Portuguese

Alô, Alô, Carnaval (1935)

Alô, Alô, Carnaval (English: Hello, Hello Carnival) is a 1936 Brazilian musical comedy film directed and produced by Adhemar Gonzaga and Wallace Downey, and released by the Cinédia production company. The film premiered on January 20, 1936, at the Cinema Alhambra in Rio de Janeiro, and on February 3, 1936, in São Paulo.

== Cast ==
- Jaime Costa as Empresário
- Barbosa Júnior as Author 1
- Pinto Filho as Author 2
- Oscarito as man in the casino
- Lelita Rosa as Morena
- Aurora Miranda
- Carmen Miranda
- Henrique Chaves as Crupiê
- Paulo de Oliveira Gonçalves as Barman
- Jorge Murad as Contador de piadas
- Dircinha Batista
- Heloísa Helena
- Alzirinha Camargo
- Irmãs Pagãs
- Francisco Alves
- Almirante
- Bando da Lua

== Production ==
Hello, Hello, Carnival was the first Brazilian film to use playback in the production of its musical numbers. Limiting this process to only a few choice scenes, direct live audio can still be heard in the background.

Originally called "O Grande Cassino", the film's inception came from the need to present singers from Brazil's golden age of radio to a larger mass audience. Set in a pre-television age, the plot focuses on a low-income population which had little, if any, access to entertainment at the nation's Casinos.

== Restoration ==
The film has been restored several times. In 1952, a print was given to the Cooperativa Cinematográfica Brasileira, where it was remounted, removing several scenes. Another restoration was made in 1974, reversing these deletions. In 1986, scenes with comedian Jorge Murad were found in the film library of the Museum of Modern Art, Rio de Janeiro. By the end of 2000, a serious quality restoration project began with substantial financial support. The team concluded its work in March 2002. The film was rereleased in São Paulo, in June 2002.
