= Francisco Alves (singer) =

Background information
- Also known as: Rei da Voz
- Born: August 19, 1898
- Origin: Brazil
- Died: September 27, 1952 (aged 54)
- Instruments: vocals
- "Aquarela do Brasil" (1939) sung by Alves

Francisco de Morais Alves (August 19, 1898 – September 27, 1952), better known as Francisco Alves, Chico Alves or Chico Viola, was a Brazilian singer, one of the most popular in the first half of the 20th century, and considered by many to be the greatest in the country. The quality of his work earned him in 1933, by broadcaster César Ladeira, the nickname "Rei da Voz" (Voice King). He recorded more than 500 78 rpm albums, among them the first electrical recording made in Brazil. He performed songs composed by musicians such as Cartola, Heitor dos Prazeres and Ismael Silva; and several songs became famous in his voice, like the first recording of samba "Aquarela do Brasil" by Ary Barroso.

Alves died in a car accident at the Rodovia Presidente Dutra, near Pindamonhangaba, on September 27, 1952.
