= Bando da Lua =

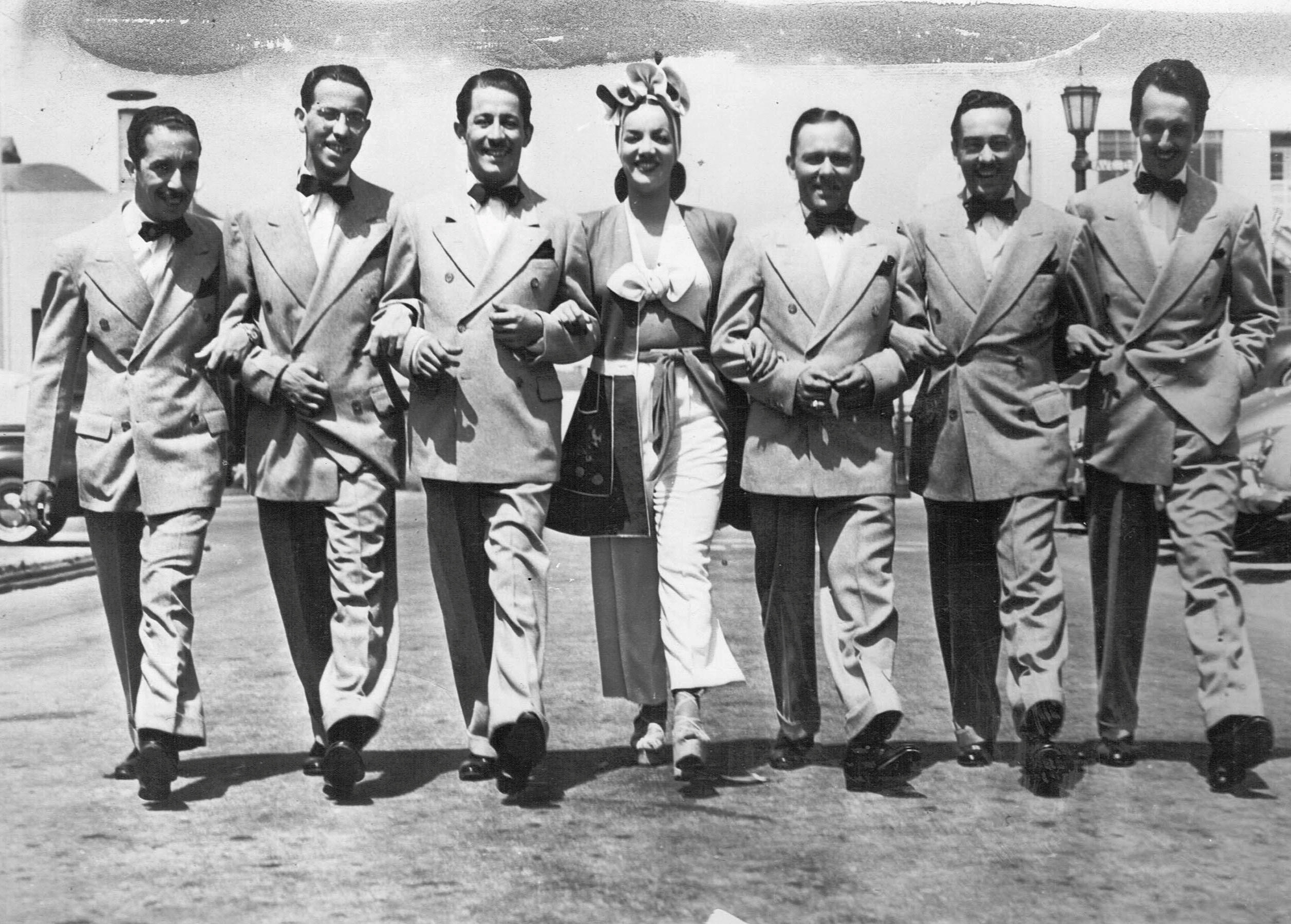
Carmen Miranda with Bando da Lua in 1942.

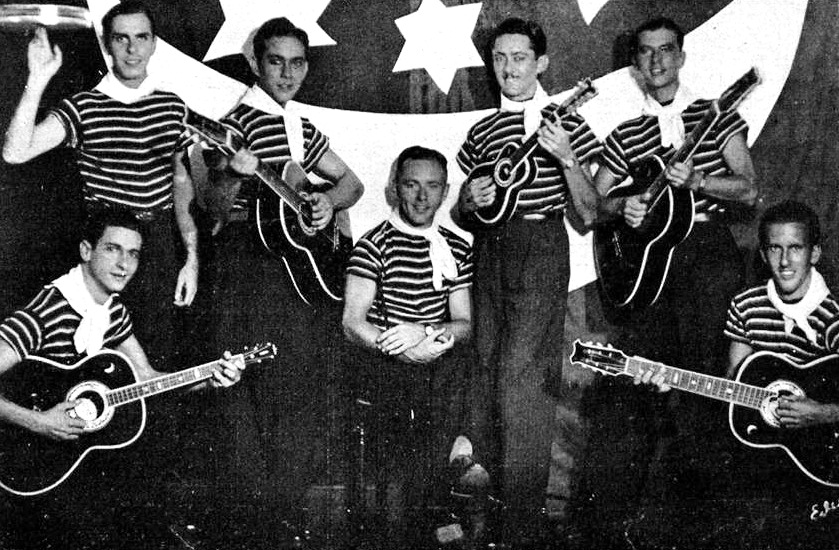
The group in 1934.

Bando da Lua was a Brazilian band that made recordings from 1933–1954, notable for being Carmen Miranda's band. It was formed by Aloísio de Oliveira, and included Helio Pereira Jordan (guitar), Osvaldo Moraes Eboli, (pandeiro), Ivo Astolfi, (tenor guitar and banjo), Alfonso Osorio (flute and percussion), Armando Osorio (guitar), and Stênio Osório (cavaquinho). They gained their name and reduced to seven members, at the prompting of Josué de Barros, in 1929.
