= Ary Barroso =

Brazilian songwriter (1903-1964)

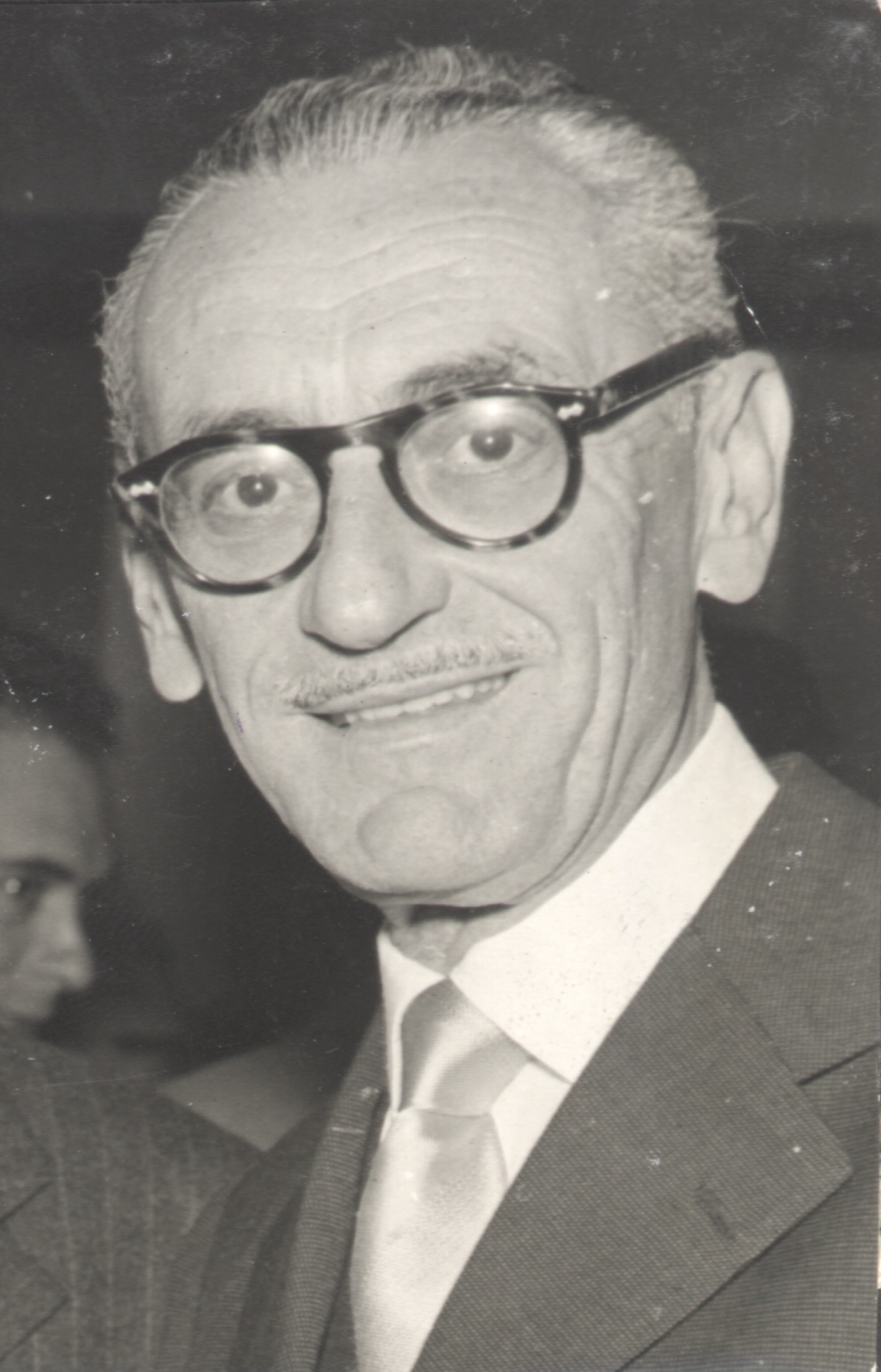

Background information
- Born: Ary Evangelista de Resende Barroso; 7 November 1903; Ubá, Minas Gerais, Brazil
- Died: 9 February 1964 (aged 60) Rio de Janeiro, Brazil
- Genre: Samba
- Occupations: Songwriter; pianist; radio announcer; presenter
- Instrument: Piano
- Years active: 1921–1960
- Website: arybarroso.com.br

Ary Evangelista de Resende Barroso ONM (Portuguese pronunciation: [aˈɾi baˈʁozu]; 7 November 1903 – 9 February 1964) was a Brazilian composer, pianist, soccer commentator, and talent-show host on radio and TV. He was one of Brazil's most successful songwriters in the first half of the 20th century. Barroso also composed many songs for Carmen Miranda during her career.

== Biography ==
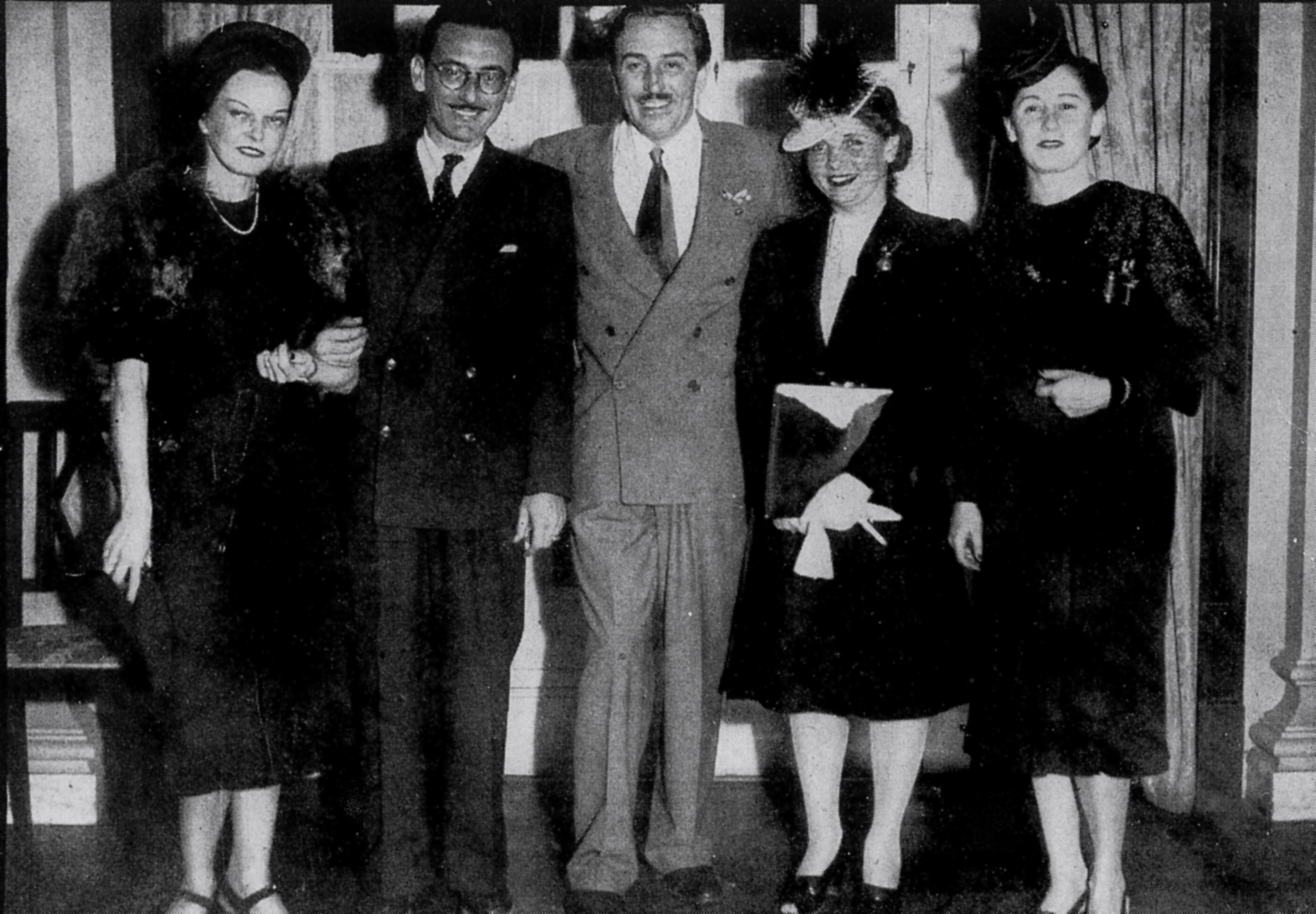
Ary Barroso with Walt Disney in Brazil (1942)

Born on 7 November 1903, Ary Barroso was the most influential pre-bossa nova composer in Brazil. Barroso's songs were recorded by a lengthy list of artists including Carmen Miranda and João Gilberto. His 1939 composition Aquarela do Brasil, known in the English-speaking world as Brazil, was featured in the 1942 Disney film Saludos Amigos, and has gone on to become one of the 20 most recorded songs of all time. His song Na Baixa do Sapateiro, based on a Brazilian pop tune, was included in the Disney film The Three Caballeros and popularised as Baía. Barroso's soundtrack for the movie Brazil was nominated for an Oscar in 1945. Although he failed to win, Barroso was presented a Merit Award from the Academy of Motion Picture Arts and Sciences for his work. In 1955, Barroso received the National Order of Merit, the greatest honour bestowed by the Brazilian government.

Music was only one outlet for Barroso's creativity. A lawyer by training, he balanced his musical career with work as a radio announcer, writer, humourist, reporter, producer, emcee, interviewer and football commentator. He was such a fan of the Clube de Regatas do Flamengo football club of Rio de Janeiro that he turned down an invitation to move to the United States at the peak of his fame in the 1940s because he didn't want to be so far from the team.

Although Barroso's father, João Evangelista, was a well-known poet, guitar player, singer and lawyer, he became an orphan at the age of seven when his parents died and was raised by his grandmother and aunt. At his aunt's insistence, Barroso began studying the piano at the age of ten, practicing a mandatory three hours a day. Within two years, he was playing so well that he was hired to accompany silent films at the local cinema. Although he inherited money at the age of seventeen when his uncle died, Barroso spent it quickly and was forced to turn to music for an income. In addition to playing piano in cinemas, cabarets and with orchestras, he became involved with musical theatre, when composed two works: "Vou à Penha", recorded by the singer Mário Reis, and "Vamos deixar de intimidades", both recorded in 1929. In 1930, Barroso won his first award promoted by Casa Edison Records, in the "Carnival Songs" category. Joining forces with lyricist Luís Peixoto, Barroso composed more than 60 tunes, as well as writing scripts.

Shortly after finishing law school, in 1929, Barroso married the daughter of the boarding house in which he lived. In an attempt to raise money, he entered and won a Carnaval song contest in 1930. Three years later, Barroso hosted the first of many radio shows.

== Death ==
In 1961, Barroso was diagnosed with liver cirrhosis. He died on 9 February 1964.

== Filmography ==
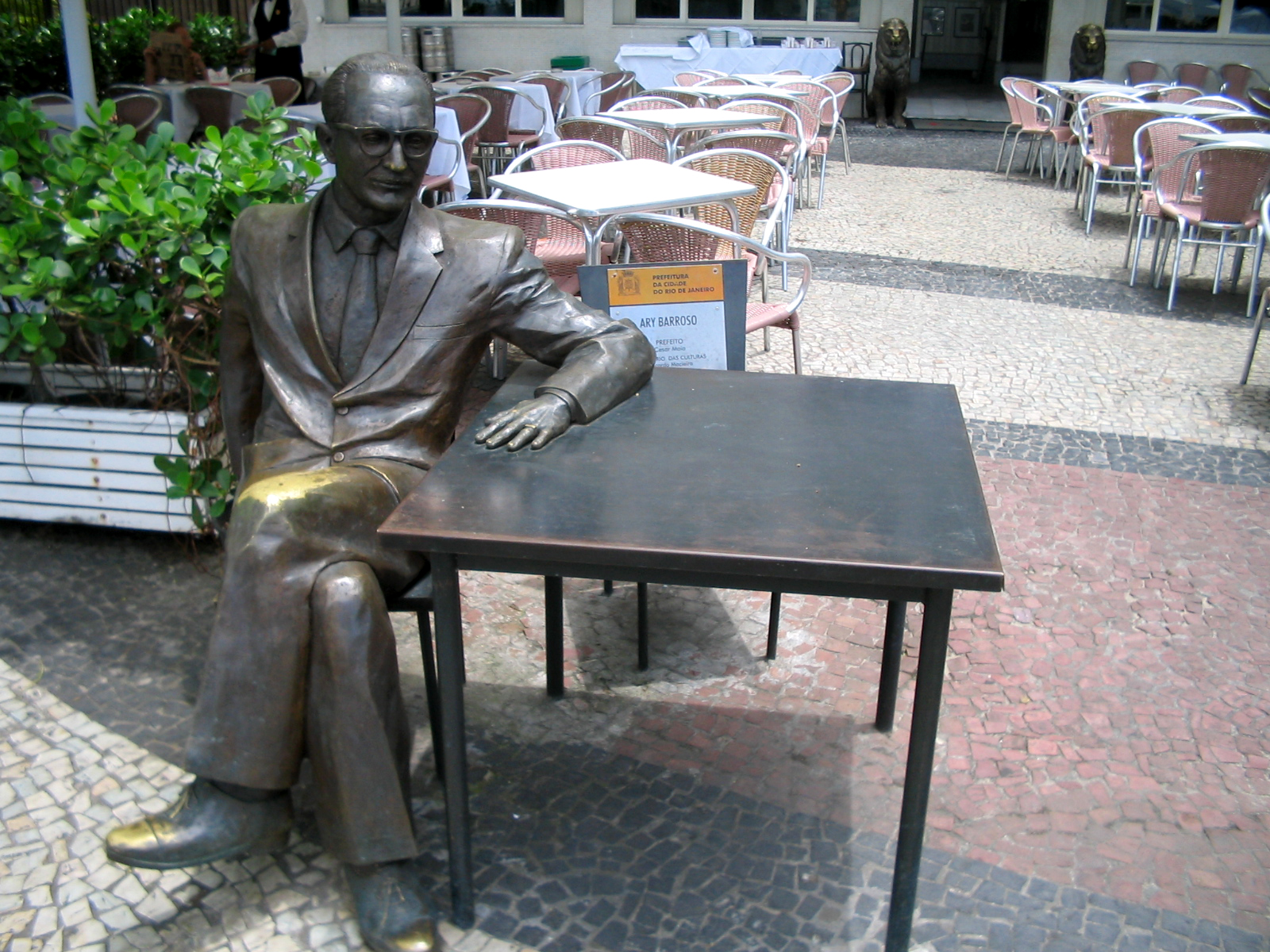
Statue of Ary Barroso on Avenida Atlântica in the neighborhood of Leme, Rio de Janeiro

- Alô, Alô, Brasil (1935)
- Music in My Heart (1940)
- Laranja da China (1940)
- Saludos Amigos (1942)
- Gals, Incorporated (1943) (uncredited)
- The Gang's All Here (1943) (uncredited)
- Popular Science (1943) (Documentary)
- Jam Session (1944)
- Something for the Boys (1944)
- Brazil (1944)
- The Three Caballeros (1944)
- Pan-Americana (1945)
- Tell It to a Star (1945)
- Easy to Wed (1946)
- The Lady from Shanghai (1947) (uncredited)
- Road to Rio (1947)
- Esta é Fina (1948)
- Sitting Pretty (1948) (uncredited)
- Revancha (1948)
- Viajera (1952)
- Cantando nace el amor (1954)
- La culpa de los hombres (1955)
- The Eddy Duchin Story (1956) (uncredited)
- Matemática Zero, Amor Dez (1958)
- Holiday for Lovers (1959) (uncredited)
- Garota de Ipanema (1967)
- Os Inconfidentes (1972)
- Silent Movie (1976) (uncredited)
- Bye Bye Brasil (1980)
- O Homem do Pau-Brasil (1982)
- Brazil (1985)
- Strictly Ballroom (1992)
- Lucky Break (1994)
- Carmen Miranda: Bananas is My Business (1995) (Documentary)
- Next Stop Wonderland (1998)
- There's Something About Mary (1998)
- Three to Tango (1999)
- Woman on Top (2000)
- Madame Satã (2002)
- Carandiru (2003)
- Something's Gotta Give (2003)
- Millions (2004)
- Ma vie en cinémascope (2004)
- The Aviator (2004)
- La gran final (2006)
- My Kid Could Paint That (2004) (Documentary)
- Chega de Saudade (2007)
- Australia (2008)
- Iron Maiden: Flight 666 (2009) (Documentary)
- Arbitrage (2012)
- Mr. Peabody & Sherman (2014)
- Spy (2015)
