= John Hench =

Disney artist (1908–2004)

- Hench (left) with Walt Disney
- Born: June 29, 1908; Cedar Rapids, Iowa, U.S.
- Died: February 5, 2004 (aged 95); Burbank, California, U.S.
- Occupations: Artist, designer, director
- Years active: 1939–2004
- Employer: Walt Disney Imagineering
- Spouse: Lowry Hench (m. 1939)

John Hench (June 29, 1908 – February 5, 2004) was an American artist, designer and director at the Walt Disney Company. For 65 years, he helped design and develop various Disney attractions and theme parks.

== Early life ==
Hench was born on June 29, 1908, in Cedar Rapids, Iowa, and raised in Southern California. He attended the Los Angeles Art Students' League. Hench attended further art and creative schools in the United States, including the Otis College of Art and Design in Los Angeles, the San Francisco Art Institute in San Francisco, and the Chouinard Art Institute in Los Angeles.

== Career ==
In 1939, Hench started as a story artist in the animation department working in areas including backgrounds, layout and art direction, effects animation and special effects. Hench was respected by Walt Disney as one of the studio's most gifted artists and worked him and Salvador Dalí on the animated short Destino, a project which began in 1945 and was not completed until 2003.

Afterwards, he moved to WED Enterprises (now known as Walt Disney Imagineering). In 1954, Hench was in the studio's live action department, as lead developer of the hydraulic giant squid in 20,000 Leagues Under the Sea. The film won an Academy Award for Best Special Effects in 1954. Hench was also Disney's official portrait artist of Mickey Mouse, painting the company's portraits for Mickey's 25th, 50th, 60th, 70th, and 75th birthdays.

Hench led the design for various attractions: Tomorrowland, the Adventureland buildings and walkways, New Orleans Square and the Snow White Grotto. He also designed Space Mountain, and Cinderella Castle at the Magic Kingdom and Tokyo Disneyland. He also contributed to attractions such as the Mickey Mouse Revue, Carousel of Progress and It's a Small World. Hench was often mistaken as Walt Disney, therefore, theme parks guests would often ask him for an autograph or photo.

One of Hench's most recognizable work is his design for the Olympic Torch for the 1960 Winter Olympics at Squaw Valley, California, which subsequent torches have been based on. The design is modeled after the torches of the 1948 and 1956 Olympiads. In 1990, he received the Disney Legend award, the company's highest honor, presented by then-CEO Michael Eisner. Hench remained at Walt Disney Imagineering in Glendale, California, until 2004.

== Personal life ==
Hench and his wife were longtime devotees of the Hindu saint Ramakrishna, were initiated by Swami Prabhavananda, and were members of the Vedanta Society of Southern California, Hench serving as the society's board president for a short time.

== Death and legacy ==
Hench died of heart failure on February 5, 2004, after a brief hospitalization in Burbank, California.

The John Hench School of Animation at the University of Southern California's School of Cinematic Arts in Los Angeles, California is named in his honor. He was a major contributor to the animation school. The school motto, "Art Makes Us Human", is a quote from Hench when he visited the school to inspire students.

== Selected works ==
Animation
Year	Title	Role
1940	Fantasia	Artist
1941	Dumbo	Artist
1945	The Three Caballeros	Artist
1946	Make Mine Music	Art Supervisor
1947	Fun & Fancy Free	Artist
1949	The Adventures of Ichabod and Mr. Toad	Art Supervisor
1949	So Dear to My Heart	Animation Effects
1950	Cinderella	Art Supervisor
1951	Alice in Wonderland	Art Supervisor
1953	Peter Pan	Art Supervisor
1953	True-Life Adventure The Living Desert	Animation Effects
1954	20,000 Leagues Under the Sea	Special Effects
1957	Our Friend the Atom	Art Supervisor
1977	The Many Adventures of Winnie the Pooh	Special Effects
2003	Destino	Story

Architect / Designer
Year	Attraction
–	Disneyland Tomorrowland
1971	Walt Disney World
1982	EPCOT Center
1983	Tokyo Disneyland

== Awards ==
- Themed Entertainment Association Lifetime Achievement Award 1998
- Disney Legend (Animation & Imagineering) 1990
- Academy Award for Best Special Effects, 20,000 Leagues Under the Sea
