= Quindim =

Typical Brazilian dessert

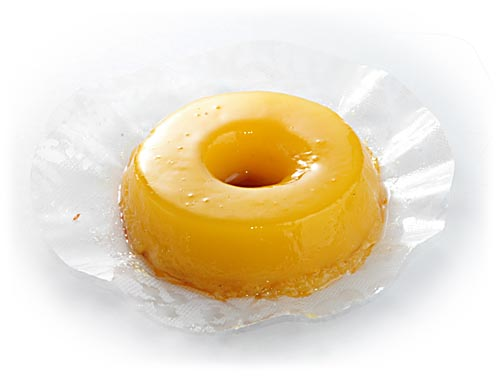
- Type: Custard
- Course: Dessert
- Place of origin: Brazil
- Serving temperature: Cold
- Main ingredients: Ground coconut, sugar, egg yolks

Quindim (Portuguese pronunciation: [kĩ ˈdʒĩ]) is a popular Brazilian baked dessert of Portuguese heritage, made chiefly from sugar, egg yolks and ground coconut. It is a custard and usually presented as an upturned cup with a glistening surface and intensely yellow color. The mixture can also be made in a large ring mold (like a savarin mold) in which case it is called a "quindão" and served in slices.

== Etymology ==
The word quindim comes from dikende in Kikongo, a Bantu language. It means "the gestures, or demeanor, or humor characteristic of adolescent girls."

== Origins ==
The heavy use of egg yolks is characteristic of many Portuguese sweets and pastries, such as the papo de anjo ("angel's crop") and fios de ovos ("egg threads"). Their combination with coconut and sugar was probably created by African slaves in 17th century Brazilian Northeast, where coconuts were abundant and sugar (from sugarcane) was a major industry.

== In popular culture ==
Quindim is also a rhinoceros character (named after the dessert) featured in Monteiro Lobato's children's books.

It is also the subject of the song Os Quindins de Yayá which is featured in The Three Caballeros and sung by Aurora Miranda.

== See also ==
- Custard and flan
- List of Brazilian dishes
- List of Brazilian sweets and desserts
- List of custard desserts
