= Papo-de-anjo =

Portuguese dessert

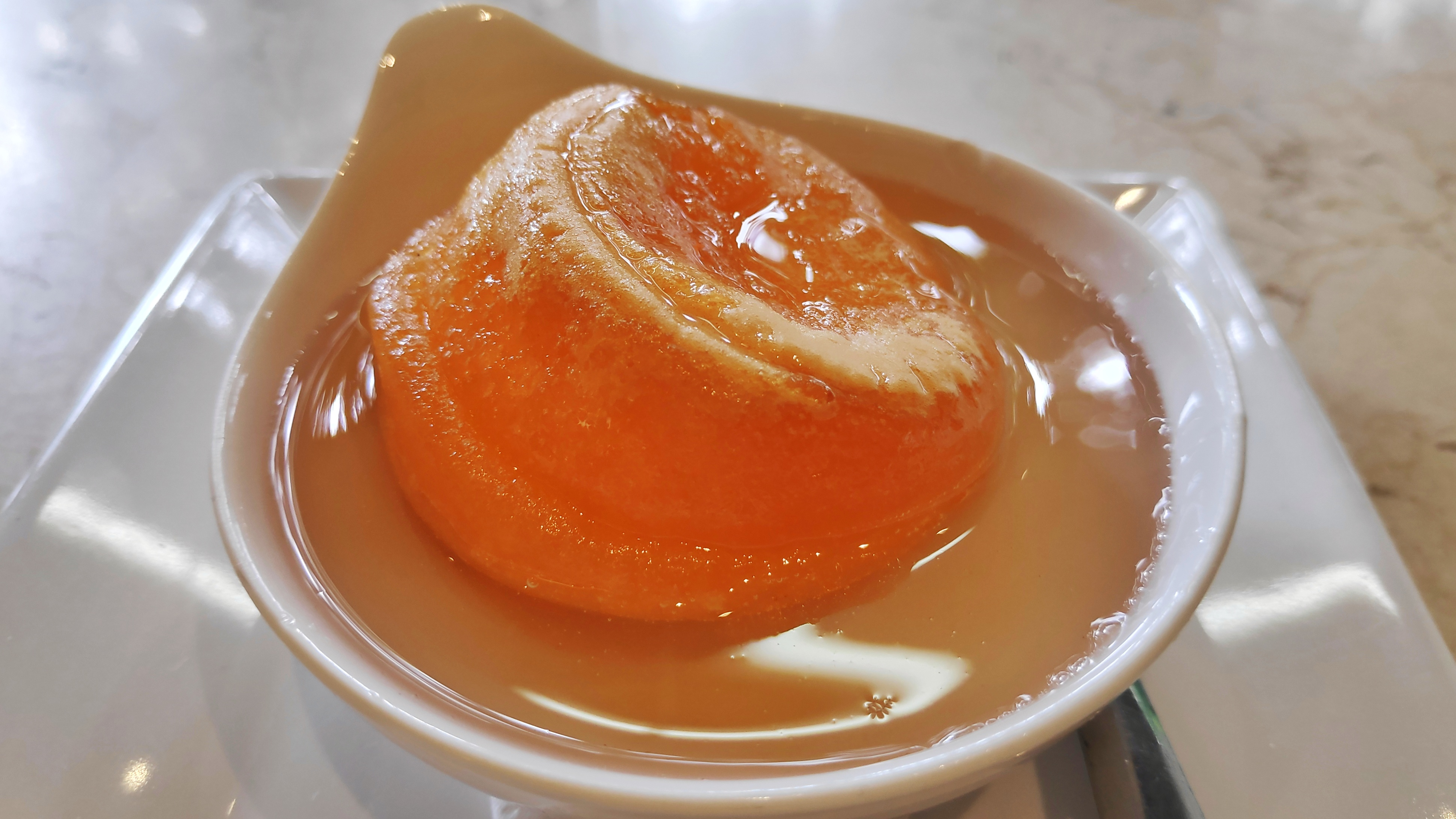
- Course: Dessert
- Place of origin: Portugal
- Main ingredients: Egg yolks, sugar syrup

Papo de anjo or papo-de-anjo, roughly translated as "angel's double chin", is a traditional Portuguese dessert made chiefly from whipped egg yolks, baked and then boiled in sugar syrup.

Like fios de ovos and several other classical Portuguese sweets based on egg yolks, papo de anjo is believed to have been created by Portuguese nuns around the 14th or 15th centuries. Laundry was a common service performed by convents and monasteries, and their use of egg whites for "starching" clothes created a large surplus of yolks.

According to most recipes, the yolks must be whipped until they swell to double their original volume. Some recipes also call for egg whites (1--2 whites for each 10 yolks), beaten separately to stiff peaks consistency and gently mixed into the yolks. The mixture is then poured into greased muffin forms (about 1/2 tablespoon each) and baked until they are firm but still without crust. The pieces are then boiled lightly in the syrup, which may be flavored with rum, vanilla, or orange peel.

== See also ==
- Quindim, a Brazilian dessert based on egg yolks
- Zabaione, a similar Italian dish
