= Os Quindins de Yayá =

"Os Quindins de Yayá" (also known as "Os Quindins de Iaiá") is a famous Brazilian song written by the renowned Brazilian songwriter Ary Barroso and first released in 1941. It gained international fame when it was sung by Aurora Miranda in the Disney film The Three Caballeros.

== Meaning ==
A quindim is a popular Brazilian baked dessert that is typically yellow and contains sugar, egg yolk, and ground coconut. As is common with Portuguese words ending in the letter "m", the plural form of the word "quindim" is spelt with an "n", as it is in this song. Yayá is a term of endearment that was originally used amongst Brazil's black slaves. Yayá is an old fashioned spelling of the word and some versions of the song have spelt it as Iaiá instead.

== Versions ==
The song has been recorded by a variety of artists including Ciro Monteiro & Orchestra, Nuno Roland with Simon Bountman e sua Orchestra do Cassino Copacabana, Fernanado Alvarez with Regional, Roberto Inglez, César de Alencar & Emilinha Borba, Trio Irakitan with Conjunto Coral de Severino Filho, and Bola de Nieve.

Perhaps the most famous version of the song was sung by Aurora Miranda for the Disney film The Three Caballeros. In the film Donald Duck and José Carioca travel to Bahia where they see a woman (Aurora Miranda) carrying a basket full of quindins that she is trying to sell and singing "Os Quindins de Yayá". A large group of men soon gather around her and join in the song.

On the official soundtrack of The Three Caballeros, the song was sung by Nestor Amaral with Bando Da Lua and with Charles Wolcott and his Orchestra.

An instrumental version performed by Stanley Black and his Piano Barroso was featured in the 1992 film Strictly Ballroom.
