= You Belong to My Heart =

Song
- Recorded: 1941
- Composer: Agustín Lara

"You Belong to My Heart" is the name of an English-language version of the Mexican Bolero song "Solamente una vez" ("Only Once" in English). This song was composed by Mexican songwriter Agustín Lara and originally performed by singer Ana María González and tenor José Mojica in the 1941 film Melodías de América.

After that, the original Spanish-language version was very popular in Mexico and Cuba as well as being recorded by many of the greatest Bolero interpreters such as Los Panchos in 1951.

== Covers of Solamente una vez ==
"Solamente una vez" has been performed by many artists including Anacani, Natalie Cole, Sara Montiel, Daniel Rodríguez, Quartetto Gelato, Arielle Dombasle, Benny Moré, Ignacio Piñeiro, Pedro Vargas, Julio Iglesias, Roberto Carlos, Andrea Bocelli, Chucho Valdés, Plácido Domingo, Nat King Cole, Marty Robbins, Lucho Gatica, Guadalupe Pineda, Roland Shaw & His Orchestra, Luis Miguel, and Cliff Richard and the Shadows.

== The Three Caballeros ==
"Solamente una vez", retitled "You Belong to My Heart", was featured in the Disney film The Three Caballeros with English lyrics written by Ray Gilbert and sung by Dora Luz. Gilbert's lyrics bear no similarity to Lara's original Spanish language lyrics.

This song is on the orange disc of Classic Disney: 60 Years of Musical Magic.

== Covers of You Belong to My Heart ==
Bing Crosby and the Xavier Cugat orchestra recorded a version of the song on February 11, 1945 for Decca Records as catalog number 23413. It first reached the Billboard magazine Best Seller chart on May 24, 1945, and lasted 9 weeks on the chart, peaking at #4.

The Charlie Spivak orchestra released a version by RCA Victor Records as catalog number 20-1663. It first reached the Billboard magazine Best Seller chart on May 17, 1945 and lasted 2 weeks on the chart, peaking at #9.

In 1949 Alfredo Antonini and his orchestra collaborated with Victoria Cordova (vocalist) and John Serry Sr. to record the song for Muzak.

In 1955, jazz pianist Jack Pleis recorded it for his album Music from Disneyland.

Elvis Presley, as part of the Million Dollar Quartet, performed a shortened version of the song, mixing Agustín Lara's original Spanish lyrics and Ray Gilbert's English lyrics.

Singers Andy Russell, Jerry Vale, Engelbert Humperdinck and Gene Autry also recorded versions mixing Lara's and Gilbert's lyrics.

Other artists to have recorded this version of the song include Paula Kelly and The Modernaires, José Carreras, The Three Tenors, Marty Robbins, the Old 97's, and Cliff Richard. Los Índios Tabajaras performed an instrumental version of the song under this title. The 101 Strings Orchestra, Enrique García Asensio, and Charlie Haden released instrumental versions of the song crediting both titles.

== Film ==
Disney would use this song again in their short film Pluto's Blue Note (1947).

Tito Guizar sang the song in the Roy Rogers film The Gay Ranchero (1948), while Ezio Pinza performed a version mixing Lara's and Gilbert's lyrics in Mr. Imperium (1951), with Lana Turner and the Guadalajara Trio.

Gene Autry sang the song in the film The Big Sombrero (1949).

The song is used in soundtrack of the 2004 film Napoleon Dynamite.

The song was also cut from a Yvonne de Carlo and Vittorio Gasman scene in the 1953 movie Sombrero.

== Only Once in My Life ==
Another English language version, titled "Only Once in My Life" was written by Janis and Rick Carnes and was released in 1998. These lyrics are not a translation of the original Spanish lyrics.
