= Dora Luz =

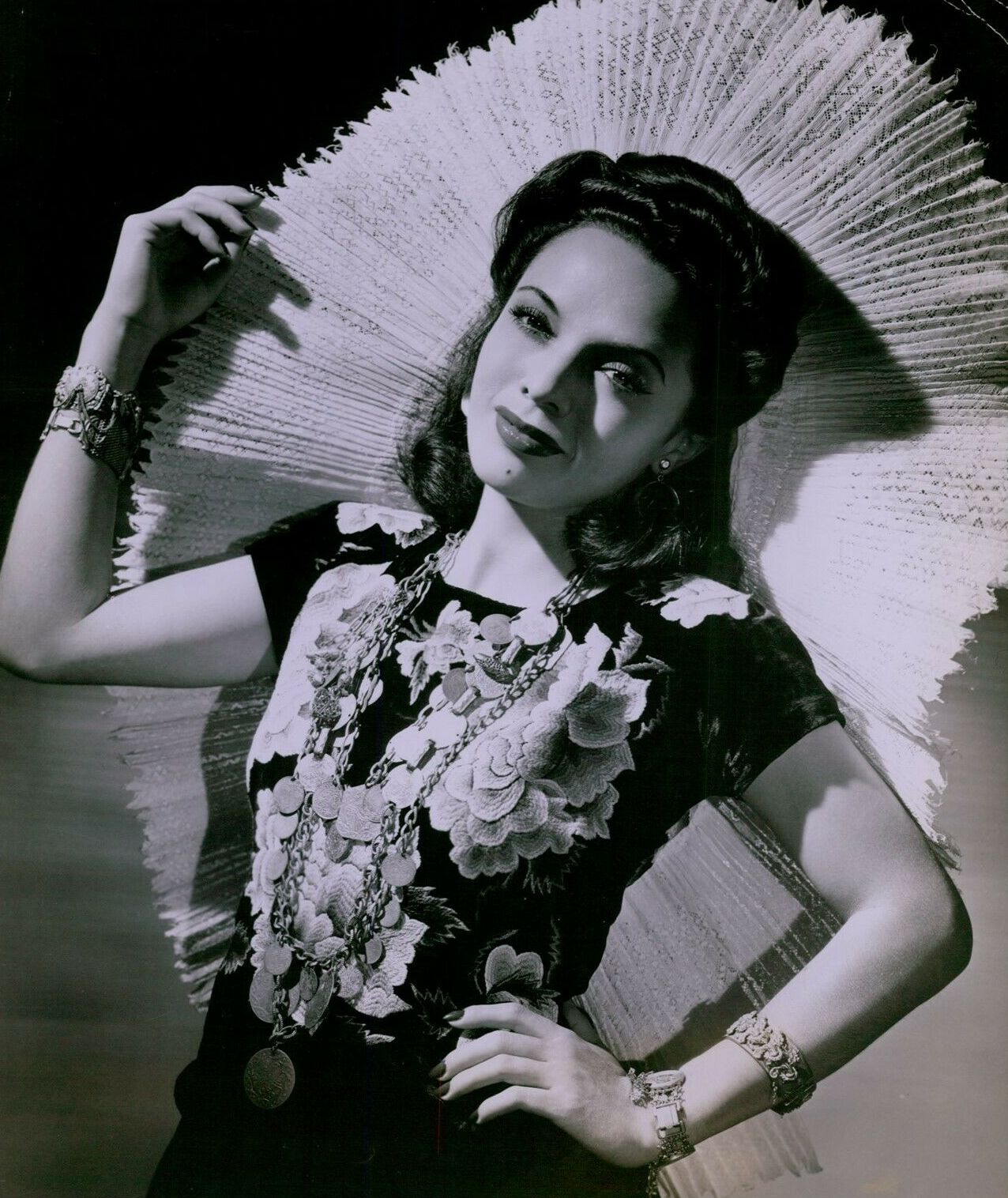
- Luz, c. 1944

Background information
- Born: May 27, 1918; Chihuahua, Mexico
- Died: July 12, 2018 (aged 100)
- Genres: Bolero
- Occupation: Singer
- Instrument: Vocals
- Labels: RCA Víctor

Dora Luz (27 May 1918 – 12 July 2018) was a Mexican singer and recording artist. She is known for her performance in Walt Disney's The Three Caballeros (1944), in which she sings Agustín Lara's "You Belong to My Heart" to Donald Duck. She also recorded "Destino", by Armando Domínguez, for Disney and Salvador Dalí's Destino in 1945.

== Discography ==
Dora Luz recorded several 78 rpm singles for the RCA Víctor label:

- "Te fuiste" / "Sin tu amor"
- "Sospecha" / "Primor"
- "Pregunta" / "Volver a verte"
- "Amor, amor, amor" / "Odio"
- "Piel morena" / "Castigo"
- "Prisionero del mar" / "¿Por qué?"
- "La primera vez" / "No puedo más"

== Filmography ==
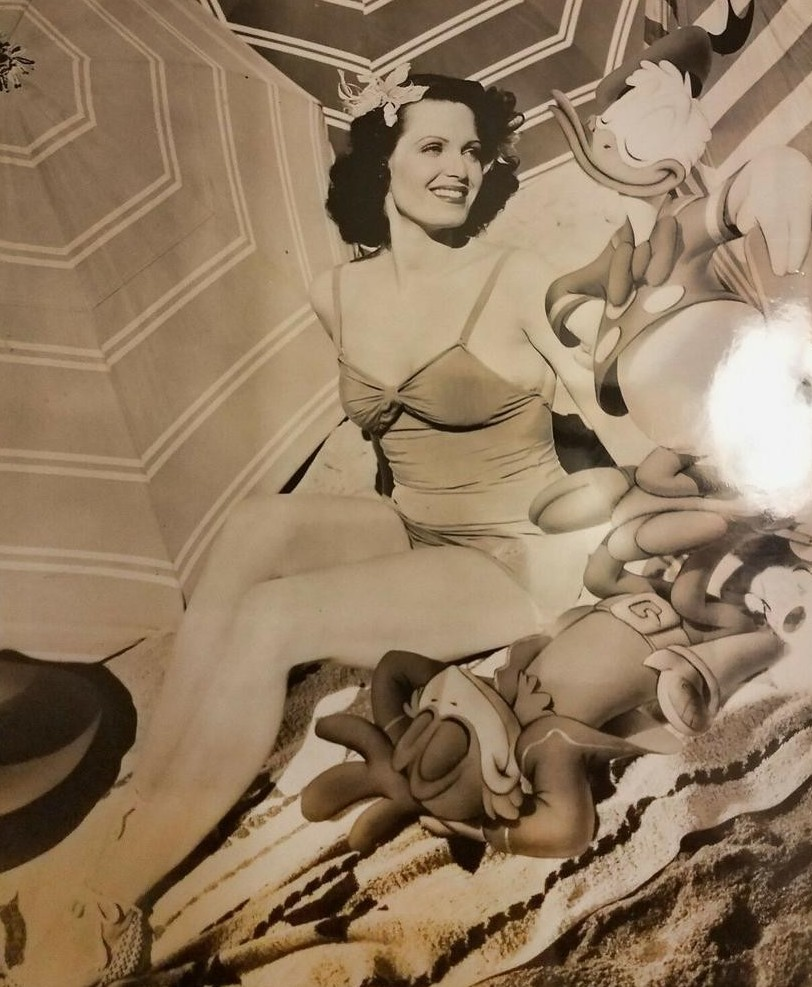
Luz in a publicity photograph for the film The Three Caballeros (1944)

Year	Title	Role	Notes
1944	The Three Caballeros	Mexican Girl	
1945	Su gran ilusión		
2003	Destino	Singer voice (Archive from 1945)	
