= Jesusita en Chihuahua =

Mexican polka

"Jesusita en Chihuahua" is a Mexican polka which was written by Quirino Mendoza y Cortés while he was serving as a Lt. Colonel in the Mexican Revolution and directing the military band in Puebla. Its premiere was held on Christmas Day 1916 and it has since been covered by a multitude of artists, under a variety of names. The composition became a trademark of the Mexican Revolution and was Pancho Villa's favorite musical piece to have his bands play during combat. The piece centers on soldaderas, women who accompanied the revolutionaries, tending to their needs and on occasion even taking up arms to participate in combat.

== Versions ==
"Jesusita en Chihuahua" came to be known by some as the "J.C. Polka" for short, and over time this developed into the "Jesse Polka" (or the "Jessie Polka"). Texas swing band Cliff Bruner and the Texas Wanderers started playing the piece in 1938 under the "Jessie Polka" name, bringing it great popularity. Cliff Bruner reportedly learned the piece as a child from Mexican farm workers in Beaumont, Texas. The piece also came to be known by the name "The Cactus Polka" under Lawrence Welk.

=== Covers ===
Other artists to cover the song include Los Creadorez del Pasito Duranguense de Alfredo Ramírez, Esquivel, the Richard Hayman Symphony Orchestra, Mariachi Vargas de Tecalitlán, the 101 Strings Orchestra, Percy Faith, Brave Combo, Raúl di Blasio, Edmundo Ros and Al Caiola.

== Film ==
A Mexican film titled Jesusita en Chihuahua was released in 1942 starring Pedro Infante as the mayor of Chihuahua who is aided by the tough Jesusita (Susana Guízar). Mendoza's polka is featured in the film.

Rafael Mendez plays a rendition in Holiday in Mexico.

"Jesusita en Chihuahua" has been featured in many other films including The Three Caballeros (1944), Anchors Aweigh (1945), This Was Pancho Villa (1957), ¡Cielito lindo! (1957), Sueños de oro (1958), Quiero ser artista (1958), La diligencia de la muerte (1961), Perdóname, mi vida (1965), Three Amigos (1986), Like Water for Chocolate (1992), and My Family (1995). English and Spanish lyrics were written to the piece for the film Love Laughs at Andy Hardy (1946). Another set of English lyrics were written to the piece by Jack Elliott for the film Old Los Angeles (1948).
