= Destino =

Short film by Salvador Dalí completed 2003

- Directed by: Dominique Monféry
- Written by: Salvador Dalí; John Hench; Donald W. Ernst
- Produced by: Baker Bloodworth; Roy E. Disney
- Starring: Dora Luz; Jennifer Esposito (uncredited)
- Edited by: Jessica Ambinder-Rojas
- Music by: Armando Dominguez Music Adaptation: Michael Starobin
- Production company: Walt Disney Feature Animation (Note: Additional production by Walt Disney Feature Animation Paris.)
- Distributed by: Buena Vista Pictures Distribution
- Release dates: June 2, 2003 (Annecy Animation Film Festival); December 19, 2003 (United States)
- Running time: 7 minutes
- Countries: United States; France

Destino is a 2003 animated surrealist short film that was originally a collaboration between Walt Disney and Spanish painter Salvador Dalí, and directed by Dominique Monféry. It was produced by Walt Disney Feature Animation. Destino is unique in that its production originally began in 1945 (five years after the release of Fantasia), 58 years before its eventual completion in 2003. The project features music written by Mexican songwriter Armando Domínguez and performed by Mexican singer Dora Luz as the soundtrack. It was included in the Animation Show of Shows in 2003.

== History ==
Destino (Spanish for 'Destiny') was storyboarded by Disney studio artist John Hench and artist Salvador Dalí for eight months in late 1945 and 1946, but production ceased not long after. Walt Disney Studios (later The Walt Disney Company) was in financial difficulty in the World War II era. Hench compiled a short animation test of about 17 seconds in the hopes of rekindling Disney's interest in the project, but the production was no longer deemed financially viable and put on indefinite hiatus.

In 1999, Walt Disney's nephew Roy E. Disney, while working on Fantasia 2000, unearthed the dormant project and decided to bring it back to life. Walt Disney Studios Paris, the company's small Parisian production department, was brought on board to complete the project. The short was produced by Baker Bloodworth and directed by French animator Dominique Monféry in his first directorial role. A team of approximately 25 animators deciphered Dalí and Hench's cryptic storyboards (with a little help from the journals of Dalí's wife Gala Dalí and guidance from Hench himself), and finished Destino's production. The end result is mostly traditional animation, including Hench's original footage, but it also contains some computer animation.

== Voice cast ==
- Dora Luz – Singing (1945 recording)

== Synopsis ==
The seven-minute short follows the story of a mortal woman named Dahlia within the confines of Chronos and his ill-fated love for her in which a prison was created. The story continues as Dahlia dances through surreal scenery inspired by Dalí's paintings. There is no dialogue, but the soundtrack includes music by the Mexican composer Armando Dominguez. The original 17-second animation test—the segment with the two tortoises—is included in the finished product; this footage is also shown in Bette Midler's host sequence for Piano Concerto No. 2/The Steadfast Tin Soldier in Fantasia 2000, where she referred to Destino as an "idea that featured baseball as a metaphor for life".

== Plot ==
A naked Dahlia wanders towards a statue of Chronos in a desolate landscape where she dozes into a dream (relatively speaking). Her body swallows the statue as she dances in a nighttime setting while wearing a dress. As she attempts to kiss a stoic Chronos, he melts away leaving her "sad and lonely", but she perks up upon seeing a variety of unusual statues and dandelion seeds blowing in the wind which entice her to dance up the spire she is standing on. Upon reaching the top, strange green eyeball creatures (one which has a pointing finger sticking out of its eye) disrupt Dahlia's happiness when her dress is caught on the eyeball creature's hand. The dress rips off and she retreats into a sea shell that falls from the spire and lands in a satchel/flower full of green eyeballs that are being held by a statue situated on an opposing structure. Dahlia leaps from the shell just before it lands and she begins hopping upon floating telephones that are close to Chronos' statue.

Dahlia awakens from her dream and is surprised by a shadow of a bell tower. Realizing how perfect it looks, she stands in front of the shadow of the bell as if she were emulating a dress with it. She fuses with the shadow and happily dances in her new dress. When she throws her head up, it transforms into a dandelion complete with the seeds blowing in the wind. The Chronos statue begins moving forward as the bird on its chest breaks free and flies away. Dahlia continues to dance, oblivious to the current event, as the scene suddenly becomes dark and the clock situated next to Chronos begins to form a glowing liquid that tries to restrain the Chronos statue. Chronos succeeds in escaping the stone and he and the bird check his melted watch as ants suddenly come out of a hole in his hand and suddenly transform into mustachioed men on bicycles with bread on their heads.

Chronos, examining the landscape, spots a dandelion seed which floats away from him and transforms back into Dahlia. The lovers spot each other, but as Dahlia attempts to step towards Chronos, a large structure rises and separates them. Dahlia sends birds flying into the labyrinth to lead Chronos towards her and he finds an exit where she bows to him. As Chronos leaves the maze, he is suddenly adorned in baseball attire, but cannot find Dahlia anywhere. Instead, he sees two tortoises with stretched faces atop of them. They create a dancing woman whose head becomes a ball that Chronos fittingly hits with a baseball bat and lands in a catcher's mitt. The mitt transforms into a giant cloth heart that Chronos hugs into Dahlia, but quickly gets swallowed by his body where his heart is.

The final shot is of the Chronos statue with a hole where the bird used to be, but straight through to the other side is the bell tower that Dahlia admired implying that they have truly become one.

== Public screenings ==
Destino premiered on June 2, 2003 at the Annecy International Animated Film Festival in Annecy, France. The film was nominated for the Academy Award for Best Animated Short Film of 2003. In 2004, Destino was released theatrically in a very limited release with the animated film The Triplets of Belleville, and also with Calendar Girls.

In 2005, the film was shown continuously as part of a major retrospective Dalí show at the Philadelphia Museum of Art, titled The Dalí renaissance: new perspectives on his life and art after 1940.

The film was also shown as part of the exhibition Dalí & Film at Tate Modern from June to September 2007, as part of the Dalí exhibit at the Los Angeles County Museum of Art from October 2007 to January 2008; at an exhibition at New York's Museum of Modern Art called Dalí: Painting and Film from June to September 2008; also at an exhibit at the Dalí Museum in St. Petersburg, Florida in 2008. In mid-2009, it had exposure in Melbourne, Australia at the National Gallery of Victoria through the Dalí exhibition Liquid Desire, and from late 2009 through April 2010 at the Dayton Art Institute in Dayton, Ohio, in an exhibit entitled Dalí and Disney: The Art and Animation of Destino.

In 2012, the film was featured in the "Dalí" exhibition at the Centre Georges Pompidou in Paris and at the Museo Reina Sofía in Madrid.

In 2019, Destino was featured in the Dalí exhibition at the Potsdamer Platz in Berlin.

In 2022 and 2023, Destino was shown on a continuous loop in the exhibition Objects of Desire: Surrealism and Design 1924 – Today, at the Design Museum in London.

== Home media ==
The Disney DVD True-Life Adventures, Volume 3 has a trailer for Destino, and mentions a forthcoming DVD release. Destino was made available on the Fantasia & Fantasia 2000 Special Edition Blu-ray disc released on November 30, 2010, as well as on the standalone Fantasia 2000 Blu-ray. Salvador Dalí Museum and Dalí Theatre and Museum also made available a standalone DVD release. These releases were accompanied by a feature-length documentary on the project called Dali & Disney: A Date with Destino. Destino was released on the Disney+ streaming service in January 2020.

== See also ==
- List of works by Salvador Dalí
