= La Sandunga =

Traditional Mexican waltz

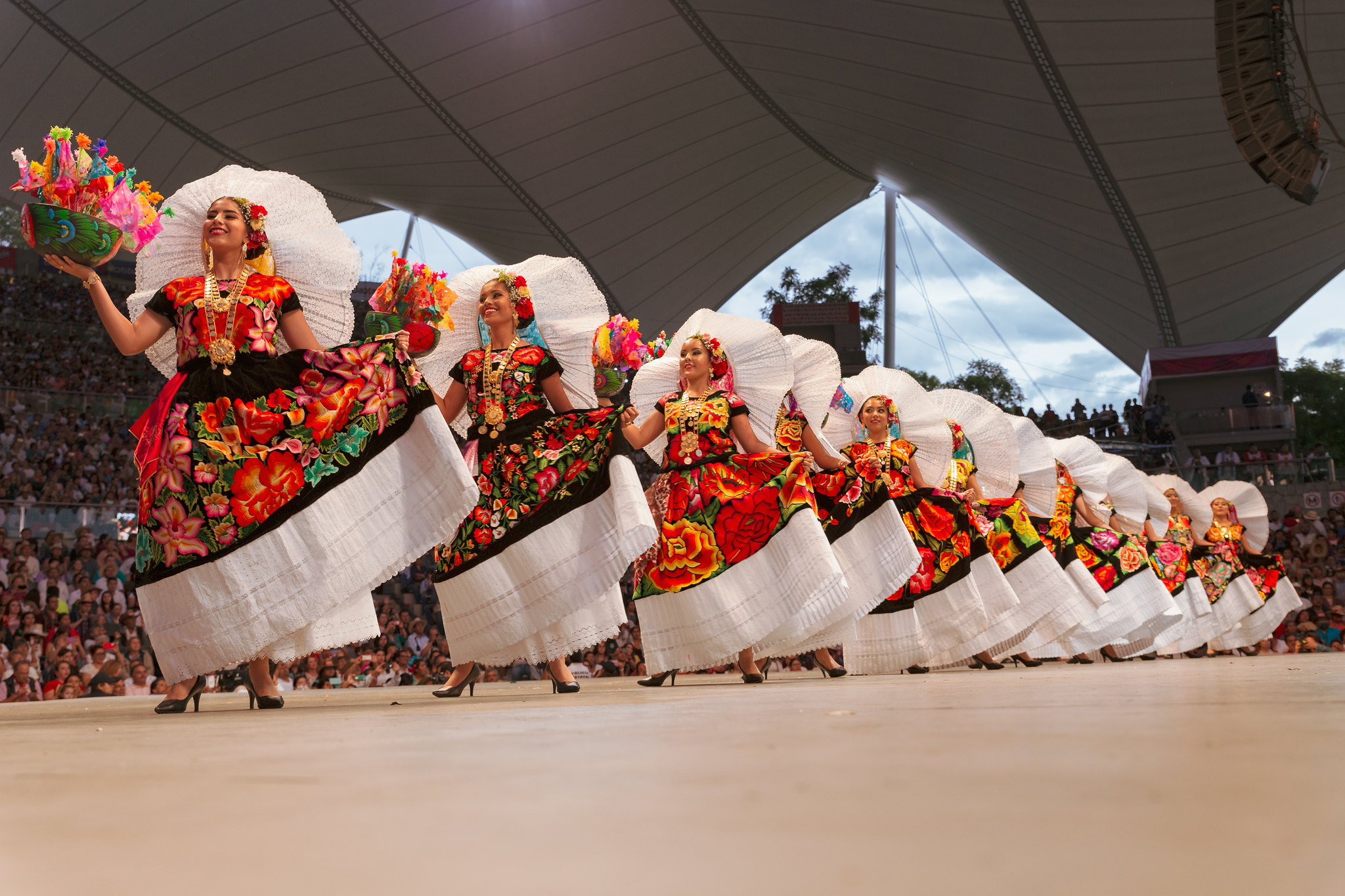
Women dancing La Sandunga in Tehuana costume at the 2018 Guelaguetza.

"La Sandunga" (also spelled "La Zandunga") is a traditional Mexican waltz and the unofficial anthem of the Isthmus of Tehuantepec, in the state of Oaxaca. It is inspired by the Spanish jota style of music and also contains Native American and Mestizo elements. Sandunga is a rarely used word in the Spanish language that can be translated in a variety of ways including; gracefulness, elegance, charm, wit, and celebration. The melody of the song is believed to have originated from Andalusia and it was rearranged by Zapotec musician Andres Gutierrez Ndre Sa’a in the Zapotec language). The lyrics were written by Máximo Ramó Ortiz in 1853 after the death of his mother. Ortiz, who served as governor of Tehuantepec also wrote the song in part to promote independence of the isthmus from the Mexican government. The song tells of a Zapotec woman mourning the death of her mother while crying out, "Sandunga".

== Vela Sandunga ==
The city of Tehuantepec is divided into neighborhoods called barrios, each of which has its own church. Every year celebrations called velas are held in honor of the patron saints of these churches. The most important of these velas is the Vela Sandunga, which is held during the last week of May. This vela is celebrated all week long throughout the entire city and is held to commemorate the creation of this song. A large festival is held, featuring presentations of musicians from the Conservatoire de Paris, the election of a festival queen, and a parade dedicated to the evolution of Tehuantepec traditional dress. The vela concludes with a procession in honor of Saint Dominic, the patron saint of the Isthmus.

== Notable Versions ==
"La Sandunga" has been covered by many artists including Chavela Vargas, Jaramar, Lila Downs, Susana Harp, Los de Abajo,Guadalupe Pineda, and Raphael.

As early as 1946 it was recorded in the United States by the Viva America Orchestra as conducted by Alfredo Antonini with Elsa Miranda and John Serry Sr. for Alpha records (Latin American Music #12205A, 12205B, 12206A,12206B).

== Film and television ==
A 1938 Mexican film titled "La Zandunga" featured this song in its soundtrack. Another from 1954, called Sandunga Para Tres, also featured the song, and uses documentary footage of the 1953 celebrations in Tehuantepec to commemorate the 100th anniversary of the song's composition.

The song is used in the "Sandunga" segment of Sergei Eisenstein's unfinished film project "¡Qué viva México!"

The song is sung and danced to by Carmen Molina in the 1944 Disney film "The Three Caballeros".

In a 1989 episode of The Benny Hill Show, Hill performs his song "Cafe Ole," which is set to the music of "La Sandunga." He had previously used the same melody in a 1972 episode where he performed it as "Zandoona."

A version of this song is played in the film “The Alamo (2004 film)” during Jim Bowie’s wedding scene.

The song is heard multiple times during Netflix's "Chef's Table" Season 2 Episode 4 featuring Enrique Olvera and his Mexico City restaurant Pujol.

The song is heard in the Pixar feature animated film "Coco".
