= Cecilia Miranda de Carvalho =

Brazilian singer (1913–2011)

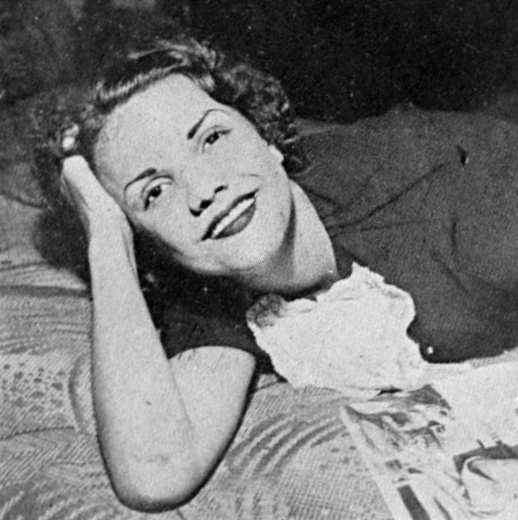
- Miranda in 1935
- Born: Cecilia Miranda da Cunha; 20 October 1913; Rio de Janeiro, Brazil
- Died: 21 May 2011 (aged 97); Rio de Janeiro, Brazil
- Spouse: Abílio Fernandes de Carvalho (m. 1931; died 1939)
- Children: 1
- Relatives: Amaro da Cunha (brother); Aurora Miranda (sister); Carmen Miranda (sister)

Cecilia Miranda de Carvalho (née da Cunha; 20 October 1913 – 21 May 2011) was a Brazilian singer. She was Carmen Miranda and Aurora Miranda's sister.

== Biography ==
Cecilia Miranda da Cunha was born in Rio de Janeiro on October 20, 1913. She was the fourth daughter of the Portuguese José Pinto da Cunha (1887–1938) and Maria Emilia Miranda (1886–1971).

At 18, she married Abilio Fernandes de Carvalho. She was successful in the 1930s, when she sang for the Radio Society of Rio (currently Rádio MEC) and participated in some records of the time. But after the birth of her only daughter, Carmen Miranda de Carvalho (later Guimarães) in 1936, Cecilia did not continue her musical career. Her husband died in 1939 due to heart problems.

In 1946, Cecilia moved to the United States, where she lived with her sister Carmen Miranda in Beverly Hills for a year.

Cecilia Miranda died on May 21, 2011, of natural causes in Rio de Janeiro at age 97. For the last six years of her life, she was the last living Miranda sister.
