= Space Mountain (Magic Kingdom) =

Outer space-themed indoor roller coaster

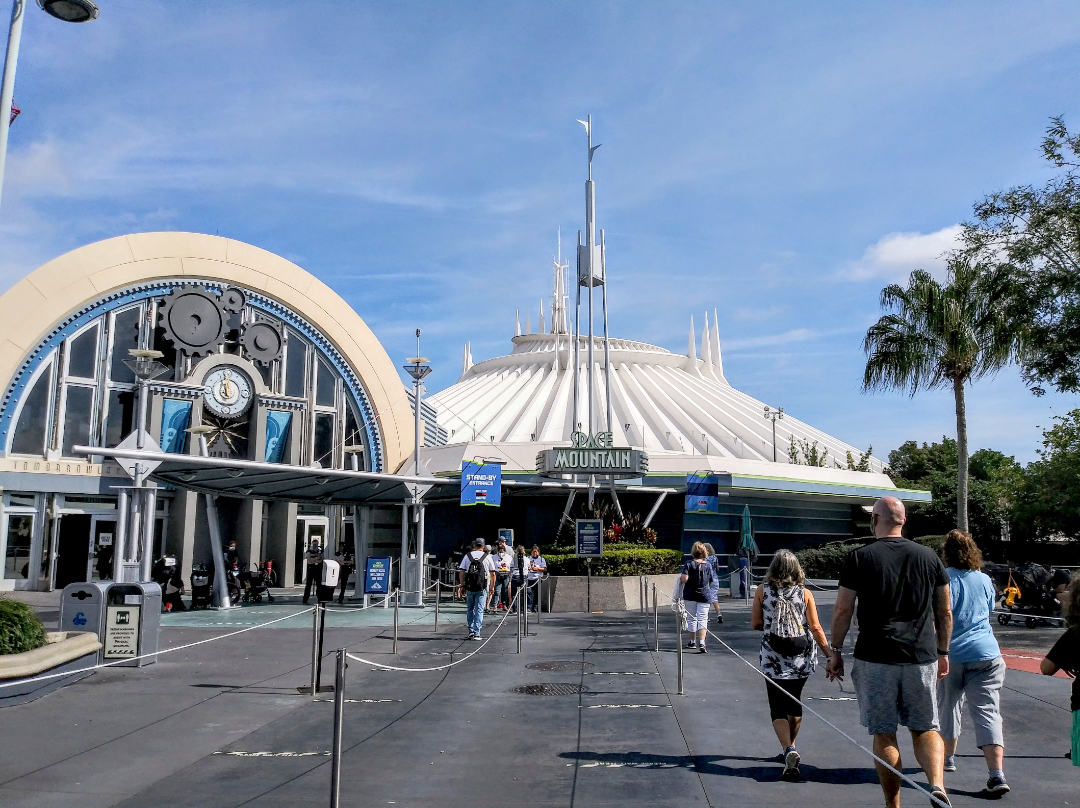

Magic Kingdom
- Park section: Tomorrowland
- Coordinates: 28°25′09″N 81°34′38″W
- Status: Operating
- Opening date: January 15, 1975; 51 years ago
- Cost: US$20 million

General statistics
- Type: Steel – Dual-tracked – Enclosed
- Manufacturer: Arrow Development
- Designer: WED Enterprises
- Model: Special Coaster Systems
- Track layout: Dual-tracked
- Lift/launch system: Chain lift hill
	Alpha	Omega
Height	65 ft (19.8 m)	65 ft (19.8 m)
Drop	26 ft (7.9 m)	26 ft (7.9 m)
Length	3,196 ft (974.1 m)	3,186 ft (971.1 m)
Speed	27 mph (43.5 km/h)	27 mph (43.5 km/h)
Inversions	0	0
Duration	2:30	2:30
G-force	3.7	
- Height restriction: 44 in (112 cm)
- Trains: 30 trains with 2 cars. Riders are arranged 1 across in 3 rows for a total of 6 riders per train.
- Sponsors: RCA (1975–1993); FedEx (1994–2004) None (2005–present)
- Music: Mike Brassell "Mount Bop"
- Trains Per Track: 13
- Lightning Lane Available
- Wheelchair accessible
- Must transfer from wheelchair
- Space Mountain at RCDB; Pictures of Space Mountain at RCDB

Space Mountain is an outer space-themed indoor roller coaster in Tomorrowland located at Walt Disney World's Magic Kingdom theme park in Bay Lake, Florida, near Orlando. The dark ride, which opened on January 15, 1975, is the original version of the iconic attraction that has since been replicated at other Disney theme park locations worldwide, with the exception of Shanghai Disneyland Resort. Space Mountain is one of the first computer operated roller coasters and is also the oldest operating roller coaster in the state of Florida.

Walt Disney originally conceived the idea of a space-themed roller coaster for Disneyland following the success of Matterhorn Bobsleds in 1959. However, due to technological and spatial limitations, the concept was further developed and eventually became a part of Walt Disney World. RCA helped fund construction and sponsored the ride from 1975 to 1993. FedEx assumed sponsorship from 1994 to 2004.

Space Mountain has undergone a number of changes since its opening, including new ride trains in 1989 and 2009, as well as incremental upgrades to incorporate modern roller coaster technology. It has also seen a number of cosmetic renovations to its entry, queue, and post-show elements, many of which were necessitated by changes in its corporate sponsorship over the years.

== Original concept and design ==
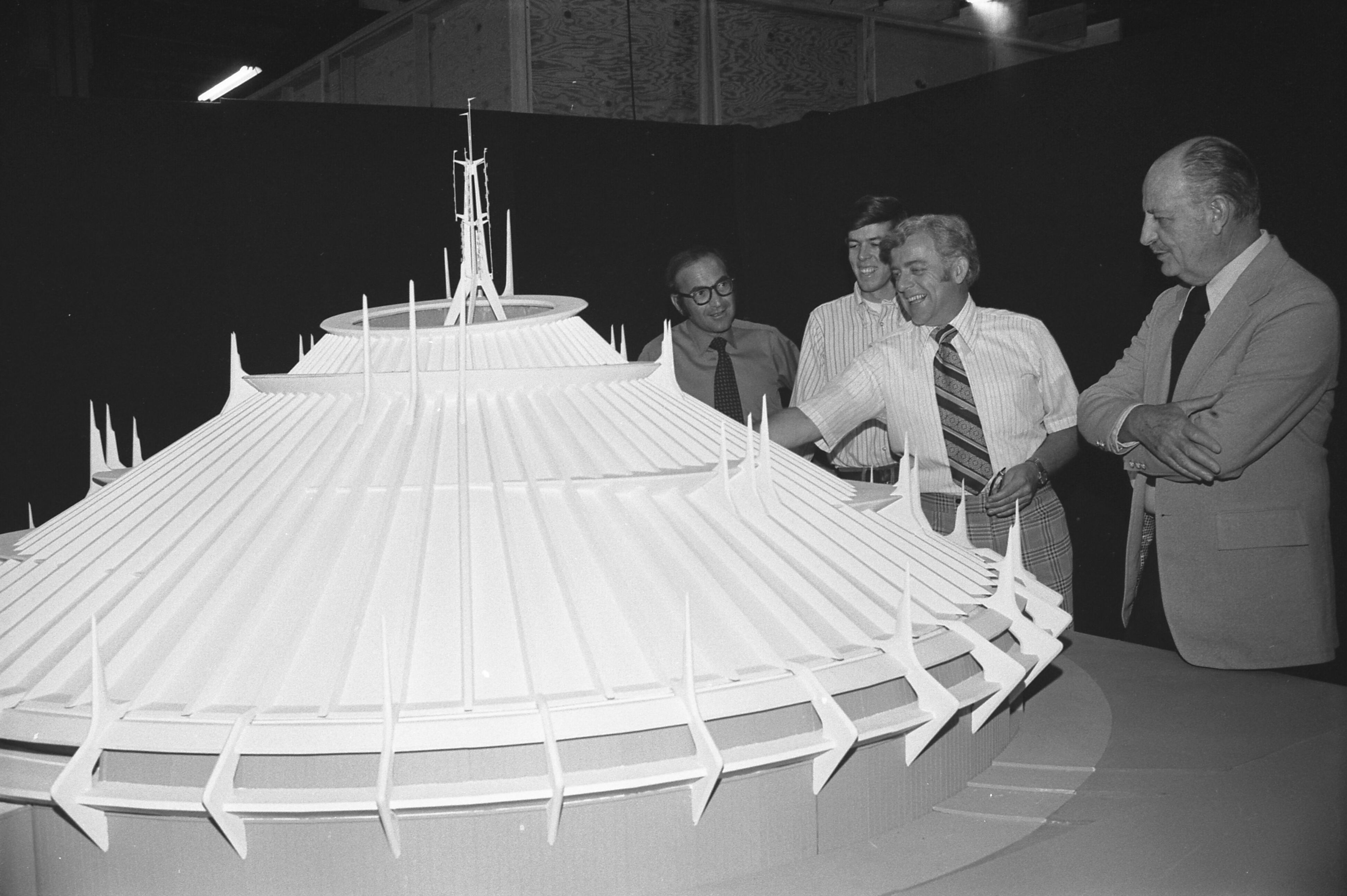
WED Enterprises engineers examining a Space Mountain model in 1973

The Space Mountain concept was a descendant of the first Disney "mountain" attraction, the Matterhorn Bobsleds at Disneyland, which opened in 1959. The Matterhorn's success had convinced Walt Disney that thrilling rides did have a place in his park.

In 1964, Walt first approached designer John Hench with his idea for a new attraction that would be the focal point of a renovated Tomorrowland planned for 1967. His "Space Port" would include a roller-coaster-style ride in the dark, with lighting and other special effects. Originally called "Space Voyage" with concept artwork by John Hench, Clem Hall, George McGinnis, and Herb Ryman. The attraction concept continued to be refined over the coming years by WED Enterprises, and in June 1966, the "Space Port" attraction was called "Space Mountain" for the first time.

WED partnered with Arrow Development Company, the same company that had helped design the Matterhorn's roller coaster systems years before. The initial concept was to have four separate tracks, but the technology available at the time, combined with the amount of space required versus that which was available within Disneyland, made such a design impossible. It is commonly believed that WED had put aside the design of Space Mountain indefinitely after Walt Disney's death and revived the project after the Magic Kingdom's early success. However press releases, concept models, and preview brochures as early as 1969 feature Space Mountain as a headlining attraction coming to Walt Disney World.

To help cover the cost of developing and building Space Mountain, Card Walker, the CEO of Walt Disney Productions, convinced RCA chairman Robert Sarnoff to sponsor the new attraction; RCA was contracted by Disney to provide the communications hardware for the Walt Disney World Resort, and their contract stated that if Disney presented an attraction of interest, RCA would provide $10 million to support it.

The interior of the structure, the queue area, the tracks of the roller coaster, and the post-show each went through a large number of various design changes before the current layout was selected. Originally, the mountain was to be positioned in the southern portion of Tomorrowland, which would be where Disneyland would install their version of the ride in 1977. Instead, it was placed outside the park's perimeter berm, roughly due east of Cinderella Castle in Fantasyland, with a tunnel, called the "star corridor", under the Walt Disney World Railroad tracks installed for people to reach it, while Carousel of Progress opened in the originally planned location. This is contrary to the Disneyland counterpart, where people directly enter through the side of the building.

== Ride experience ==
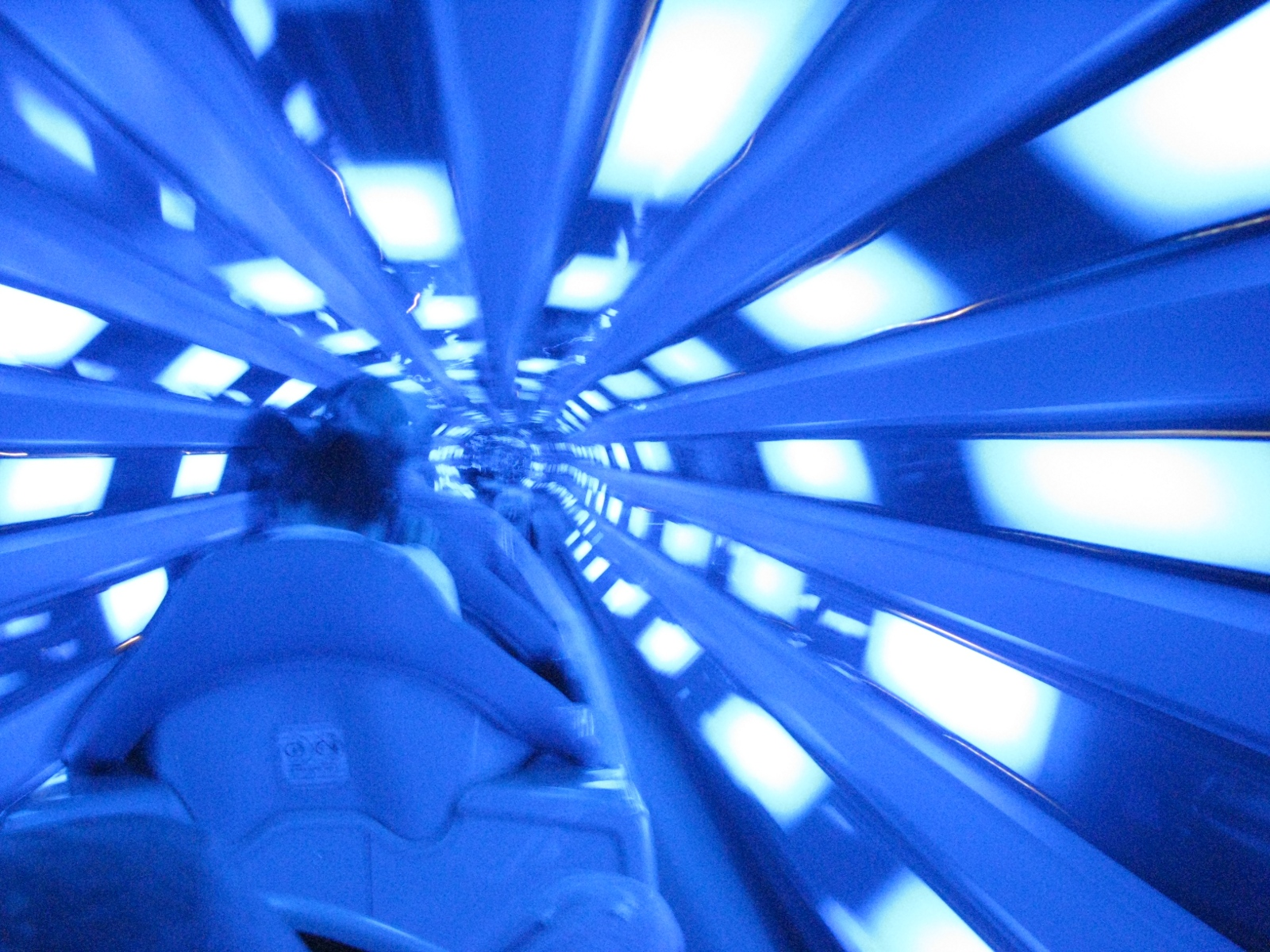
The "energizing" tunnel leads the trains to the lift hill.

=== Queue ===
After visitors enter the building, the queue opens into a large room filled with small, silver, ball-pit like balls. The room also contains a "star map". The line then dips into the "star tunnel", which takes guests under the Walt Disney World Railroad and into the cone containing the ride. At this point, the post-show tunnel is running parallel to the queue. The queue then begins to ascend to a second floor, and passes by "space windows" in the walls featuring planets, astronauts, and a model of the spaceship from the lift hill. The queue continues to turn until riders are deposited in the loading station. Previously, stand-by riders could participate in various 90-second long video games that were hosted by a robot that operates Space Mountain's mission control center. These games included blasting asteroids to clear a path for spaceships leaving the spaceport, sorting the lost and found items into the proper bins, and controlling spaceships that expand the spaceport. The screens that were used for these games now show images of space, and riders can play games using the Play Disney Parks app on their own devices.

Guests are then deposited in the load area, where they can see guests aboard their trains departing every few seconds, all while mission control can be heard via speakers as they monitor spaceport activities. The queue splits up into lines for the two separate tracks: Alpha (left) and Omega (right). Both tracks are approximately 65 feet in height and are identical mirror images of one another.

=== Ride experience ===
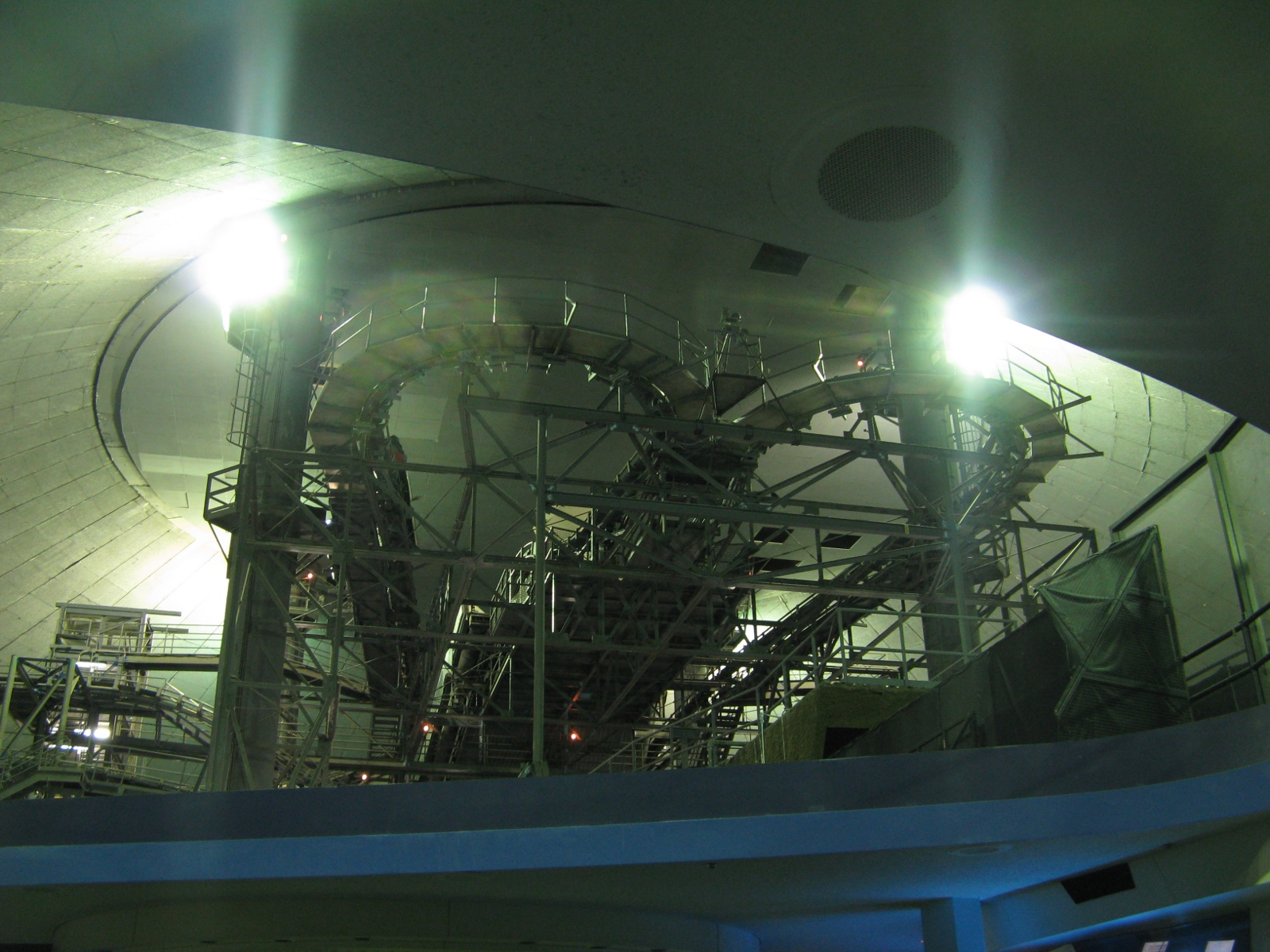
Before 2009, it was possible to view the interior of the mountain from the loading station when the work lights were on. (These turnarounds are still visible when riding the PeopleMover through Space Mountain when the lights are on.)

Visitors board the trains in the Starport: Seven Five, which is enclosed within the mountain itself. The cone is hollow and 300 ft in diameter, allowing waiting people aboard the PeopleMover to see many of the different effects used in the attraction.

As the trains leave the loading station, they make a 180 degree turn past the loading area, the queue, and the Mission Control booth, and stop at a holding brake, where they wait for the train in front to clear the block on the lift hill. After a few seconds, the holding brake is released and the trains roll down a drop into a strobe tunnel of pulsating blue lights, which flash at a gradually increasing frequency as the train progresses down the tunnel. A repetitive warping sound signifies an energy charge as the riders roll towards a blue orb (originally a mirror prior to 2009). At the far end of the tunnel, a field of stars appears as the blue strobe lights turn off. The train then makes a 180 degree turnaround and climbs the lift hill. During the turn, the on-ride photo is taken.

The lift hill is designed in the form of a launch bay and contains a large, narrow spaceship which was based on the Discovery One spaceship from the film 2001: A Space Odyssey. Full size figures of astronauts are suspended upside-down beneath the ship's engines to give the illusion of zero-gravity. As trains climb up the lift hill, projections of the Sun, Mercury, Venus, Earth, Mars, Jupiter, Saturn, Uranus, Neptune, Pluto, stars, comets, meteors, asteroids and the Milky Way can be seen when looking past the lift hill bay's open ceiling. It is possible to make out trains climbing the lift hill on the other side and also rockets passing through on the side, as well as the trains of the PeopleMover passing between the two tracks. Once at the top, the trains then make a small and quick dip before plunging into numerous twists and turns as they travel around the mountain in near-complete darkness, including the coaster tracks' steepest drop of 39 degrees. The ride ends with the trains passing through a red and orange swirling wormhole, before hitting the final brake run and entering the unload station, located underneath the loading station. After unloading, trains then travel around a short turn and climb a short lift hill to return empty to the loading station.

=== Trains ===
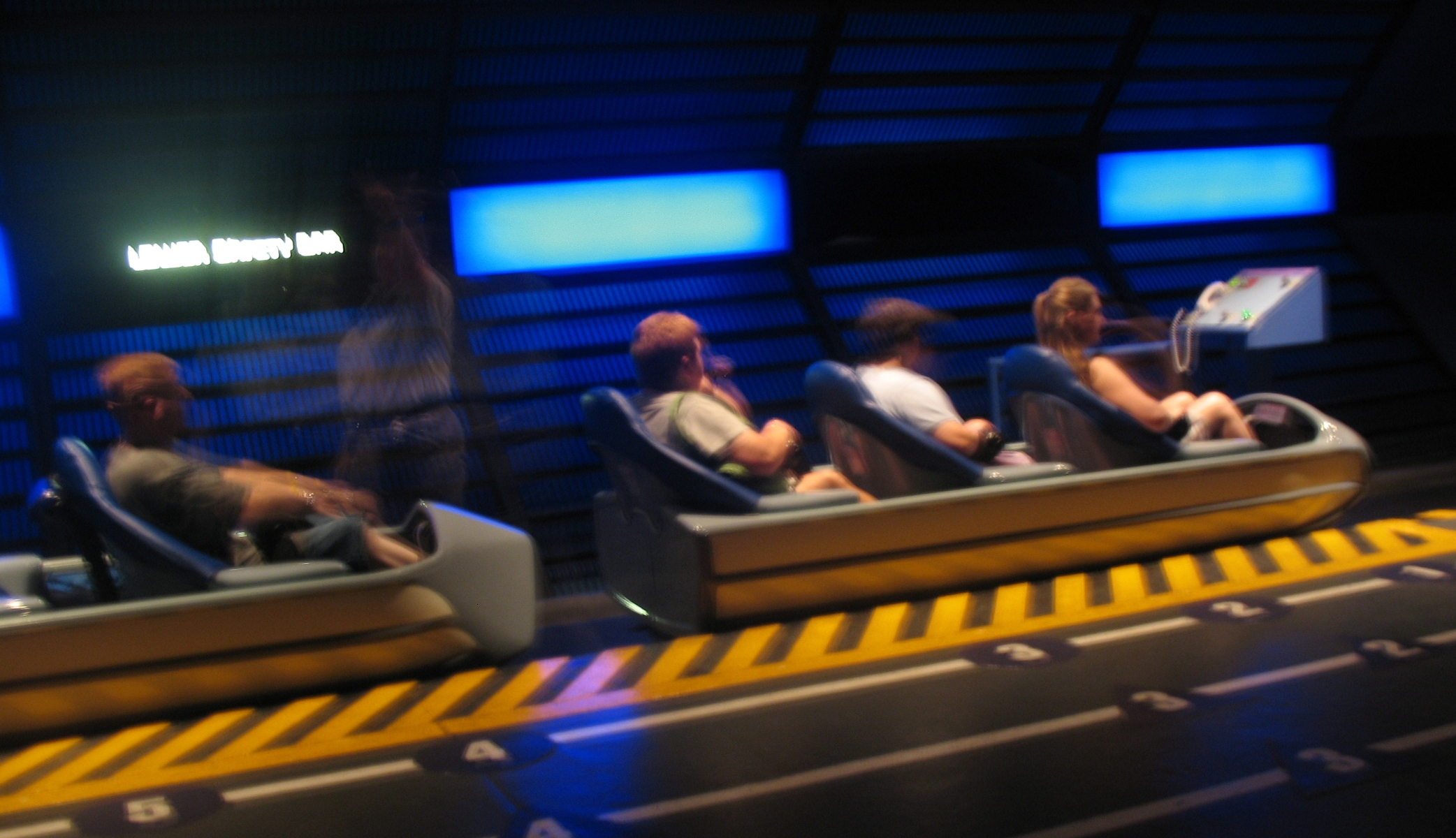
Prior to the 2009 refurbishments each train had luminescent stripes that would glow during the ride.

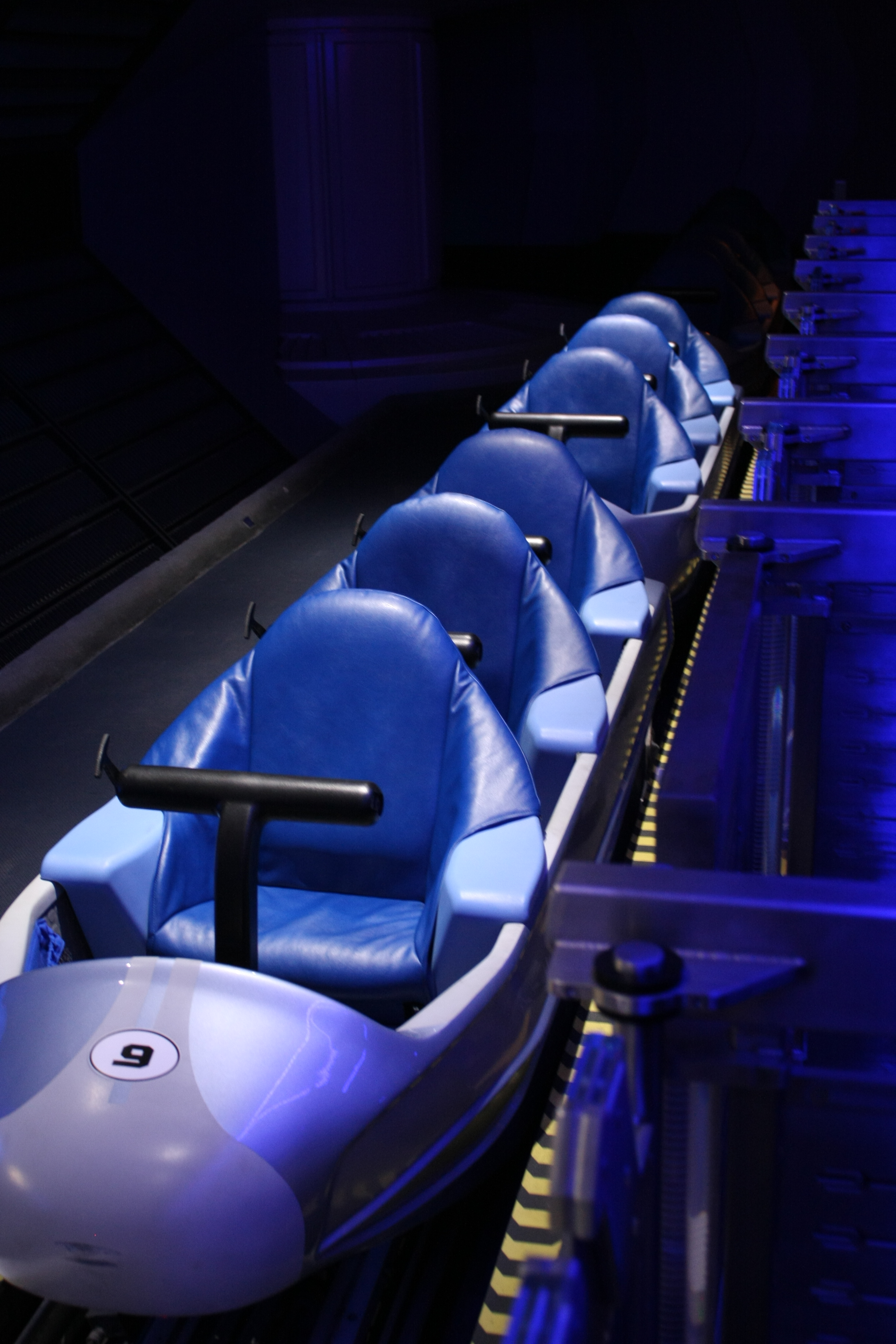
The same trains above after the 2009 refurbishment.

The trains featured on the ride each consist of two rocket-shaped cars. Each car consists of three rows that seat one rider per row, resulting in a total capacity of six riders per train. From 1975 to 1989, the train cars featured two rows instead of three. Each row seated two riders in a configuration similar to the original trains used on the Matterhorn Bobsleds, where one passenger in each row sat in front of the other in a lap-seating configuration. The total capacity was previously eight riders per train.

The trains introduced in 1989 are cosmetically similar to the originals and still consisted of two cars joined together. The newer trains introduced the use of lap bars, with an early iteration using a horseshoe-shaped design. In 1998, an updated T-bar-shaped design for the restraints was introduced. The original color scheme of the trains was white, but in the 2009 refurbishment, the trains were modified with new seat fabric and repainted in a blue and gray color scheme.

== Building characteristics and sponsorship ==
=== Sponsorship (1975–2004) ===
From 1975 to 1993, Space Mountain was sponsored by RCA. The left entrance wall had the words "Space Mountain" displayed in bold, blue colored letters. The RCA logo was above this, and under the Space Mountain lettering was the slogan "A Journey Through Time and Space", beneath which was the phrase "presented by RCA".

The ceiling and flooring for the entrance building was done in reds, yellows, and oranges. A large white pylon structure had the RCA logo placed above it in three areas, and four passengers, dressed as astronauts, were placed in an original four seater vehicle, which was attached to the pylon. Below the pylon, in a planter was Space Mountain's dedication plaque which read: "ONE GIANT STEP... Dedicated to the men and women whose skills, sacrifice, courage and teamwork opened the door to the exploration of man's exciting new frontier...outer space. Because they dared to reach for the stars and the planets, man's knowledge of his universe, earth and himself has been greatly enriched. Presented by missile, space and range pioneers. January 15, 1975."

Inside, riders entered the spacious lobby, which did not feature the current mural of the Milky Way, but was simple black and blue walls with various yellow and orange angular designs. There were also floor to ceiling mirrors, support columns, and blue lighting under the floor. The floors themselves were made out of a combination of plastic and vinyl and featured black textured circles sticking out of the flooring. The rest of the inside of the structure, with the exception of the warning film, and the changes made to the vehicles, remains nearly the same from 1975.

For the first year or two of operation, a model of an RCA communications satellite was on display. After that, a flying saucer with RCA's Nipper mascot ("His Master's Voice") replaced the satellite.

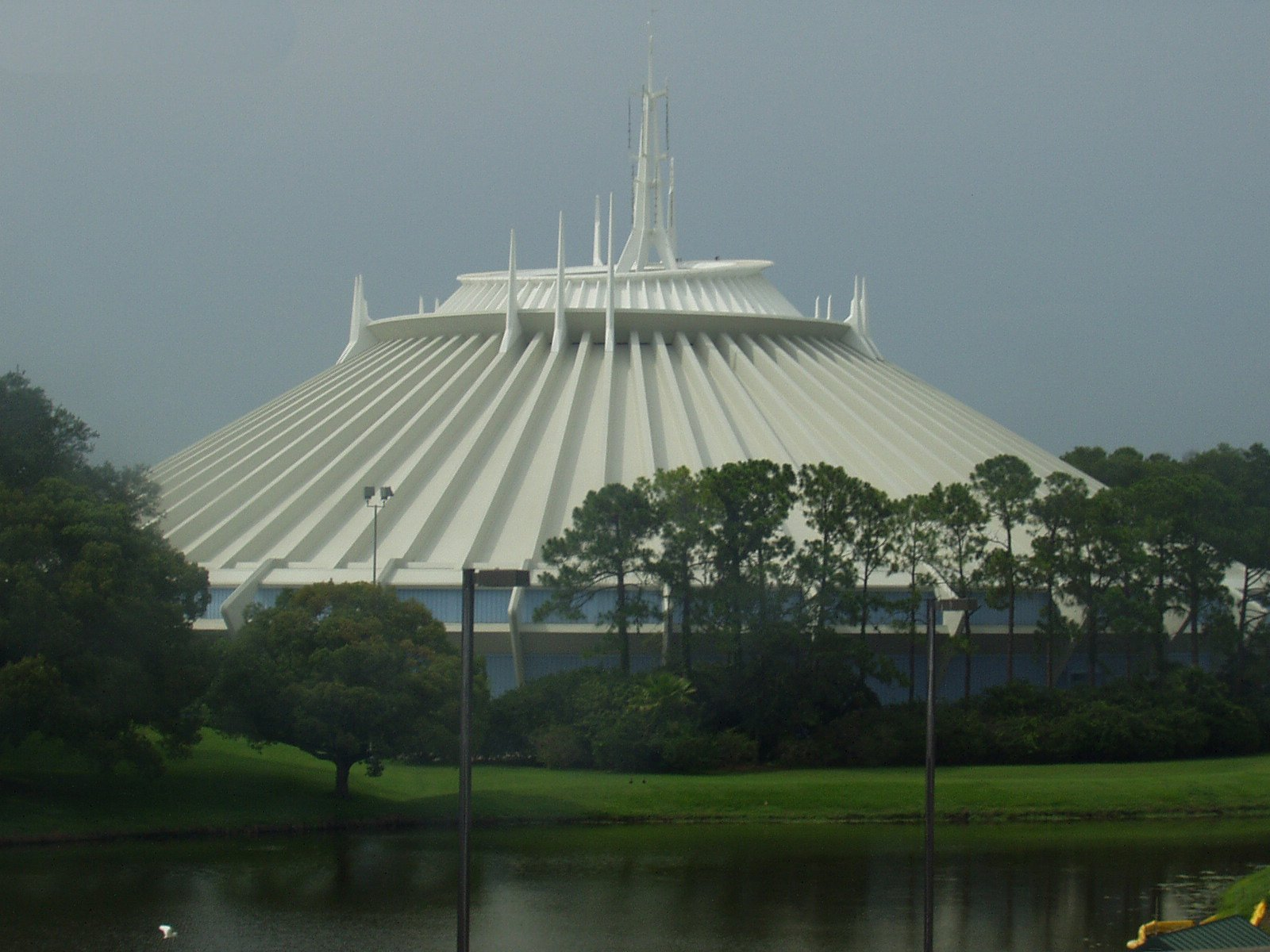
Exterior of the ride as seen from the Monorail.

In 1989 RCA had the entrance cosmetically refurbished. The entrance door now had a yellow and black pattern around it. The entrance walls were repainted with the 1975 white and blue color scheme, but with solid and different patterns. The roof was still the same blue and white, as was the roof border, a solid white, but the ceiling was now also a solid white. The left entrance wall still featured the RCA logo, but a new font was selected for the phrase "Space Mountain", still bold, but was more angular, and now colored white. This was reflected in the phrase underneath it, "A Journey Through Time and Space", and "presented by RCA" was not included in the 1989 refurbishment.

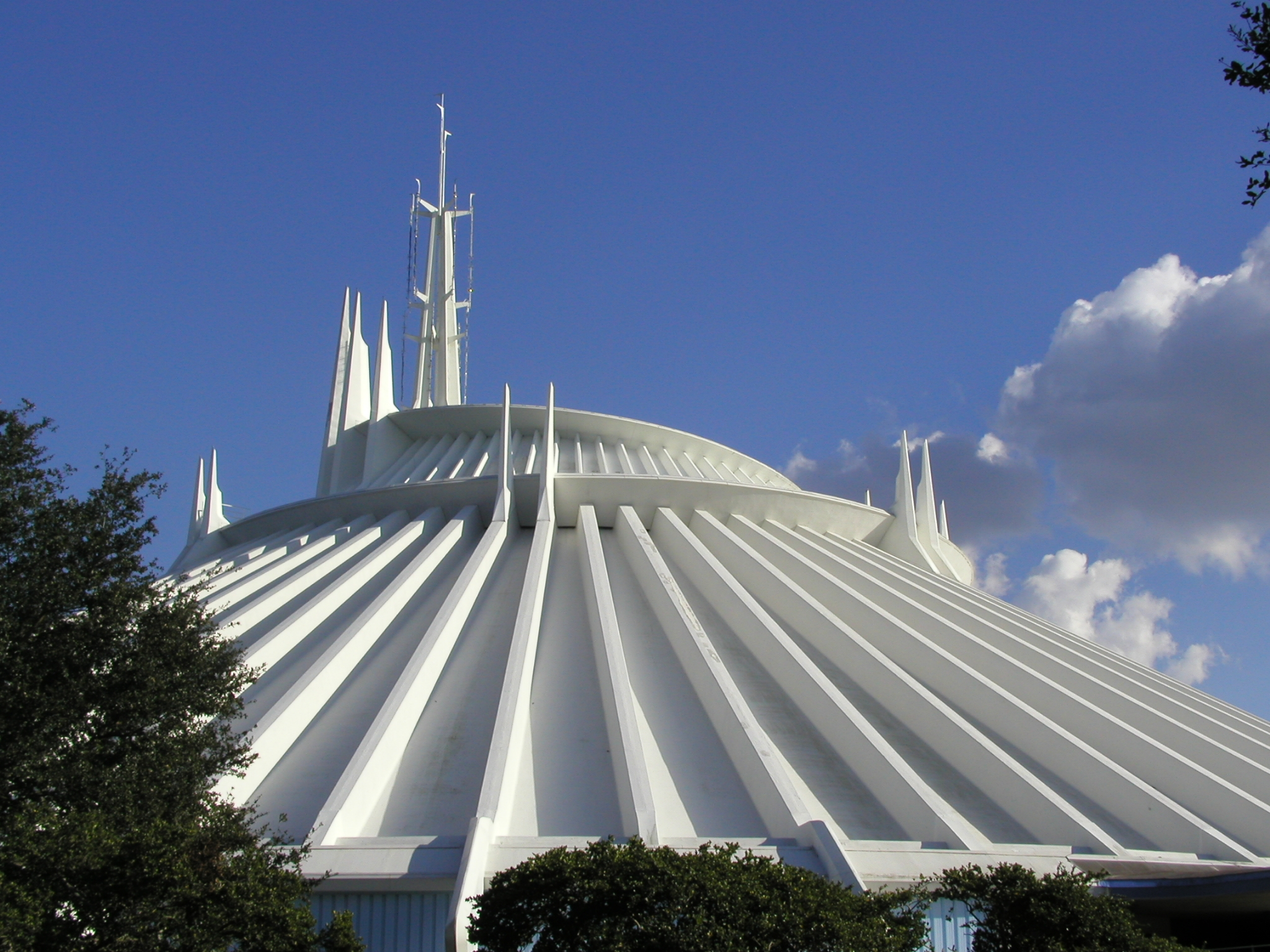
Space Mountain at the Magic Kingdom as viewed from the Holland Expressway walkway.

The RCA logos atop the pylon were removed, and a new three seater vehicle replaced the old four seater vehicle that was attached to the pylon, a result of the original trains on the ride being replaced by the current trains. Everything else, including warning signage and other features dating back to 1975, remained the same. RCA once again had the entrance refurbished in 1992, this time all the entrance walls were covered over with blue vinyl covers. Some patterns were different from others. The 1989 left entrance wall lettering was simply placed on top of the new wall coverings. The yellow and black pattern around the entrance door remained the same. The ceiling and flooring remained the same, but the roof was now solid white, and the border to the roof was now red, white, and blue.

As part of the 1994 overhaul of Tomorrowland, both Space Mountains at the American parks received sponsorship from FedEx. The 1989 entrance remained very much the same, but now the entrance and exit building was partially demolished, forcing exiting riders to exit into an arcade and gift shop that occupies part of the still vacant space left for the proposed but never built Tomorrowland railroad station. The left hand entrance wall, that served for years as the signage for Space Mountain was demolished in the 1994 refurbishment. The right hand entrance wall was now used for signage and simply had the ride name in a tall, thin, orange font, that was meant to reflect the architecture of the New Tomorrowland.

The large entrance door was kept, but now had storm shutters placed within the frame, creating a smaller entrance. New warning signage and warning spiels also came in 1994. A new, but different pylon tower was placed over the site of the old one. It too featured the new Space Mountain font and FedEx sponsorship. The warning film was also changed in 1994 for updated footage and to also feature FedEx sponsorship. In the queue, while guests waited for their rockets, monitors above them played the futuristic but funny "SMTV" video, which featured Space Mountain mission control notifying them on the status of the vehicles and channel surfing to find a newscast to keep them up to date on what's happening around the galaxy. The loop also features commercials for Crazy Larry's Used Spaceships, which featured Charles Fleischer, the voice of Roger Rabbit, as the titular dealership owner, and several sci-fi themed ads promoting FedEx's delivery service. The warning film has so far changed only three times. The original in 1975, and two updated versions both in 1985 and 1994. The FedEx footage was removed in 2005.

The entrance lobby was refurbished with an orange and brown color scheme, but still maintained the blue floor lights, and black vinyl flooring, while adding in a FedEx sponsored intergalactic tracking network mural of the Milky Way. In 1998, the original flooring was removed and a staircase was added in the left hand queue, which is now the Stand By queue. The right queue, which has a ramp instead of a staircase, making it wheelchair accessible, is for the FastPass return line. FastPass machines were also added outside of Space Mountain at this time.

=== Sponsorless (2005–present) ===
In 2004, FedEx left as sponsor, leaving Space Mountain sponsorless; the majority of FedEx logos and sponsorship themes were removed in 2005, but some were not removed until 2009. In the 2009 refurbishment, the Skyway terminal was partially demolished after sitting abandoned for years, to create an expanded entry plaza. The existing infrastructure was not changed significantly, although the orange tones in the pylon were replaced with a lime green. The murals in the entry building were also changed accordingly to fit the boarding station's new theme.

From April 19 to November 21, 2009, Space Mountain received a major refurbishment. It was the first extensive renovation since a previous closure in September 1999, and was estimated to cost $12.3 million. The refurbishment gave a ride a sci-fi futuristic look similar to the Tokyo Disneyland counterpart. While the ride experience itself was unchanged, the sound effects in the energy and wormhole tunnels were updated, and an on-ride camera was installed on the turnarounds from the energy tunnel to the lift hill. The most significant change to the ride was in the loading station. The loading station, which originally had no ceiling, was roofed over, to reduce the amount of light visible inside the mountain (the TTA's exit from the mountain was also modified with an extended wall, to achieve a similar effect). Gates were also added to the platform where guests board the trains. The computer system was also updated to decrease the chance of ride breakdowns and to increase operational efficiency.

In August 2010, the ride received "Starry-O-Phonic Sound" effects. These new sound effects play throughout the mountain, to further enhance the ride experience. The underlying musical score was composed by Mike Brassell, who also serves as the current narrator for Living with the Land and was the former voice of the PeopleMover from 2009 to 2022. The score incorporates motifs from Michael Giacchino's score for Disneyland's version.

== Off-ride musical score ==
From 1975 to 1985, the entrance and exit building had overhead speakers playing the big band and orchestral portion of the song "Here's to the Future and You", composed by Xavier Atencio and Buddy Baker. The entrance lobby had the softer portion of this song; however the music heard in the star corridor and zig-zag corridor near the loading station remain original from 1975. For a brief period in the late 1970s, RCA switched the song over to "Colortrak Keeps The Color On Track!", in reference to the company's new line of Colortrak TVs. The warning spiel for the trains, and most sound effects are also original from 1975. Riders could hear music to the song "Music Makers" and "Sentimental Journeys" where the left and right side unload corridors merged to form the line for the post show.

In 1985, RCA removed their theme song, and instead commissioned new generic music for Space Mountain. Since 1985 there is no outside area music around the exit and entrance building. Only the current warning narration spiel is played. In the lobby a rendition of the song "We've Come So Far", composed by George Wilkins can be heard and has remained since 1985. When riders unloaded from their ride vehicle, they entered the ride's post-show, which was also accessible for those who decided not to experience the main roller coaster ride. From 1985 to 2005, the unload and merger corridor both played a softer variant of "We've Come So Far". The main version of "We've Come So Far", which included sung lyrics, was heard in the exit tunnel until RCA's sponsorship ended.

In 2005, this was replaced with a musical score commissioned for Disneyland's newly refurbished Space Mountain. After the 2009 renovations, the same songs in the queue play, but the musical score commissioned for Disneyland's Space Mountain is no longer played in the post-show. Most of the main ride sound effects were updated and replaced.

== Post-show ==
After disembarking the ride, passengers used to board a moving walkway taking them back to Tomorrowland. A flashing warning sign and spiel are located above the platform entrance, both original from 1985. While aboard the moving platform, riders pass multiple rooms and displays, many of which received extensive changes in 2009 along with the rest of the ride.

The original post-show was RCA's "Home Of Future Living", which showcased how consumer electronics would shape our lives in a "typical" home of the future. The attraction featured the theme song "Here's to the Future", briefly replaced by a song (apparently) titled "ColorTrak Keeps The Color On Track", designed to promote televisions employing RCA's ColorTrack color television technology. In 1979, the RCA Selectavision Videodisc player system was promoted as the future of home entertainment. In the mid-1980s, the Home of Future Living was replaced by "RYCA-1", which showed what life might be like living in a space colony on another planet. The RYCA-1 sets went through minor re-decoration when FedEx took over sponsorship, and the plot of the show revolved around sending packages across spatial distances using teleportation. The third diorama saw the most significant changes, adding figures of astronauts excavating alien fossils and teleporting them to a base on another planet where a robot dog named the "lab retriever" received the package. This post-show also featured a narration that described what was taking place in each scene. All traces of FedEx were removed after the company relinquished its sponsorship. The post-show remained the same until 2009, with only the narration being removed and replaced with a soundtrack based on Michael Giacchino's score for the updated version of Disneyland's Space Mountain.

The post-show also received major changes and upgrades along with the rest of the ride in 2009. Many of the rooms received renovations to appear more futuristic in relation to current-day standards, as many of the previous renditions could've been considered as outdated. This included replacing their increasingly retro appearances and refitting the rooms with sleeker, modern designs. The scenes are now more directly connected to the spaceport theme of Space Mountain, revolving around promoting different destinations around the universe to which Space Mountain's rockets could take them, adding monitors to the RYCA-1 diorama to promote the activities that guests could take part in when visiting said destinations. In addition, the ride retained some of its notable post-show features while still receiving an update, including the monitors displaying the riders as they pass by the overhead cameras.

In the summer of 2018, a major refurbishment was done to the post-show. The moving walkway which had remained in place since 1975 was controversially removed and carpeted over. The green screen room was replaced by a set of switchback ramps up to a slightly differently placed exit into the gift shop. The ride remained open while the post-show walkway was removed, with guests using a temporary alternate exit via a walkway around the outside perimeter of the ride building.

All of these rooms are shown and viewed on an even surface, but after the final octagon room, the walkway dips down at an angle, where riders go under the train tracks for the Walt Disney World Railroad. As riders travel back up to ground level, and toward the exit to Tomorrowland, they pass by other outer-space destinations. The first two octagon rooms and the first four hexagon rooms can all be viewed from the PeopleMover just after passing through the lift hill bay because they have no ceilings.

=== References to Horizons ===
When Space Mountain was refurbished, a number of tributes to the defunct Epcot attraction Horizons were added into the ride.

- One of the bags in the baggage claim (located on visitors' left at the start of the exit moving sidewalk) features the words "Mesa Verde" written on it.
- The undersea post-show scene after the desert scene is reminiscent of a scene in Horizons. This scene was the only new scene added to the post-show in the refurbishment – all of the other scenes were tweaked or redressed. The flatscreen display in the new scene describes the scene as "20,000 Light-years under the Sea", a pun on "20,000 Leagues Under the Sea", which is a reference to both the original 70s post-show scene depicting a futuristic family watching the Disney movie of the same name, as well as to the defunct Magic Kingdom attraction 20,000 Leagues Under the Sea: Submarine Voyage.
- The robot valet and futuristic city skyline, which is the last post-show diorama, are similar to a scene in Horizons and to the lounge that Disney used to operate in LAX.

== See also ==
- Space Mountain
