= Once Upon a Mouse =

- Title card for Once Upon a Mouse
- Directed by: Jerry Kramer; Gary Rocklen
- Written by: Jack Weinstein; Robert Resnikoff
- Produced by: Jerry Kramer; Gary Rocklen; Howard E. Green (Disney); Cardon Walker (Disney)
- Starring: Walt Disney; Clarence Nash; Aurora Miranda; Betty Lou Gerson; Hans Conried
- Cinematography: Richard Cohen; Dion Hatch
- Edited by: Jack Weinstein
- Production companies: Kramer/Rocklen Studios; Walt Disney Productions
- Distributed by: Buena Vista Distribution
- Release date: July 10, 1981
- Running time: 27 minutes
- Country: United States
- Language: English

Once Upon a Mouse is a 1981 American theatrical featurette directed by Jerry Kramer and Gary Rocklen of Kramer/Rocklen Studios, produced in association with Walt Disney Productions. It was released on July 10, 1981 on a double bill with The Fox and the Hound.

== Dedication ==
In celebration of our twentieth animated feature, we invite you to relive with us the story telling magic, the wit, the wisdom, the humor, the understanding of a very special person who gave the world a timeless and universal art form. This is the legacy of Walt Disney...

— Opening titles of Once Upon a Mouse

== Plot ==
A documentary featurette produced in celebration of the studio's 20th (soon to be 24th) feature-length animated film The Fox and the Hound which highlights sixty years of Walt Disney's legacy beginning with Steamboat Willie in 1928 followed by a kaleidoscopic magic carpet ride through the world of Disney animation, including segments from hundreds of films shown through the use of montages, collages, computerized optical effects, behind-the-scenes footage, and special tributes to Disney and Mickey Mouse.

The featured clips include Mickey Mouse shorts, The Jungle Book, Bambi, Fantasia, The Rescuers, Song of the South, One Hundred and One Dalmatians, Snow White and the Seven Dwarfs, The Adventures of Ichabod and Mr. Toad, Alice in Wonderland, Lady and the Tramp, Pinocchio, Dumbo, Peter Pan, Sleeping Beauty, The Aristocats, The Sword in the Stone and Robin Hood.

Once Upon a Mouse began airing on The Disney Channel in the mid-1980s and would be shown again in reruns, the last time being in 2002 as part of the Vault Disney block of programming.

== Cast ==
The following appeared on archival footage:

- Walt Disney as Himself / Mickey Mouse
- Clarence Nash as Donald Duck
- Aurora Miranda as Herself (The Three Caballeros)
- Betty Lou Gerson as Cruella De Vil (101 Dalmatians)
- Hans Conried as Magic Mirror (Snow White and the Seven Dwarfs) / Captain Hook (Peter Pan)
- Jim Jordan as Orville (The Rescuers)
- Bob Newhart as Bernard (The Rescuers)
- Evelyn Venable as Blue Fairy (Pinocchio)
- Dickie Jones as Pinocchio (Pinocchio)
- Joaquin Garay as Panchito Pistoles (The Three Caballeros)
- Adriana Caselotti as Snow White (Snow White and the Seven Dwarfs)
- Harry Stockwell as The Prince (Snow White and the Seven Dwarfs)
- Lucille La Verne as Queen Grimhilde (Snow White and the Seven Dwarfs)
- Stuart Buchanan as Humbert the Huntsman (Snow White and the Seven Dwarfs)
- Billy Gilbert as Sneezy (Snow White and the Seven Dwarfs)
- Pinto Colvig as Ichabod Crane (screams) (The Adventures of Ichabod and Mr. Toad)
- Verna Felton as Queen of Hearts (Alice in Wonderland)/Flora (Sleeping Beauty)
- Eric Blore as J. Thaddeus Toad (The Adventures of Ichabod and Mr. Toad)
- Campbell Grant as Angus MacBadger (The Adventures of Ichabod and Mr. Toad)
- Nelson Eddy as Willie the Operatic Whale (Make Mine Music)
- Barbara Luddy as Lady (Lady and the Tramp)
- Bill Thompson as Jock (Lady and the Tramp)
- Bobby Driscoll as Peter Pan (Peter Pan)
- Kathryn Beaumont as Alice (Alice in Wonderland)
- Richard Haydn as Caterpillar (Alice in Wonderland)
- Christian Rub as Geppetto (Pinocchio)
- Ilene Woods as Cinderella (Cinderella)
- Mike Douglas as Prince Charming (Singing Voice) (Cinderella)
- Eleanor Audley as Maleficent (Sleeping Beauty)
- Geraldine Page as Madame Medusa (The Rescuers)
- Edward Brophy as Timothy Q. Mouse (Dumbo)
- Candy Candido as Brutus and Nero (The Rescuers)
- Phil Harris as Thomas O'Malley (The Aristocats)
- Peter Behn as Young Thumper (Bambi)
- Thurl Ravenscroft as Monstro the Whale (Pinocchio)
- Thelma Boardman as Girl Bunny (Bambi)
- Frankie Darro as Lampwick (Pinocchio)
- Cliff Edwards as Jiminy Cricket (Pinocchio)

== Home media ==
The short was released in Japan on August 25, 1986 on VHS and LaserDisc as part of a compilation of Disney shorts called Once Upon a Mouse and Other Mousetime Stories. This compilation also features The Flying Mouse (1934), Three Blind Mouseketeers (1936), Brave Little Tailor (1938) and Ben and Me (1953).

== See also ==
- List of American films of 1981
- List of Disney live-action shorts
- List of Walt Disney Pictures films
