= The Three Caballeros =

1944 animated film by Walt Disney

- Theatrical release poster
- Directed by: Norman Ferguson (supervising); Clyde Geronimi (sequences); Jack Kinney (sequences); Bill Roberts (sequences); Harold Young (sequences)
- Story by: Homer Brightman; Ernest Terrazas; Ted Sears; Bill Peet; Ralph Wright; Elmer Plummer; Roy Williams; William Cottrell; Del Connell; James Bodrero
- Based on: Donald Duck by: Walt Disney; Dick Lundy
- Produced by: Walt Disney; Norman Ferguson
- Starring: Clarence Nash; José Oliveira; Joaquin Garay; Aurora Miranda; Carmen Molina; Dora Luz
- Music by: Edward H. Plumb; Paul J. Smith; Charles Wolcott
- Production company: Walt Disney Productions
- Distributed by: RKO Radio Pictures
- Release dates: December 21, 1944 (Mexico City); February 3, 1945 (U.S.)
- Running time: 72 minutes
- Country: United States
- Languages: English; Spanish; Portuguese
- Box office: $3.355 million (worldwide rentals)

The Three Caballeros is a 1944 American live-action/animated anthology film produced by Walt Disney and released by RKO Radio Pictures. The film premiered in Mexico City on December 21, 1944, and was released in the United States on February 3, 1945. It was later released in the United Kingdom in March 1945.

The film celebrates the tenth anniversary of Donald Duck and follows his journey through Latin America, combining live-action with traditional animation. It is the second of the six package films released by Walt Disney Productions during the 1940s, following Saludos Amigos (1942), and is one of the earliest feature films to blend live-action and animation.

The narrative is presented through a series of self-contained segments, linked by the framing device of Donald receiving birthday gifts from his Latin American friends. Featured performers include Aurora Miranda (sister of Carmen Miranda), Dora Luz, and Carmen Molina.

The film was developed as part of the studio's contribution to the U.S. Good Neighbor policy toward Latin America during World War II. Donald is joined by returning character José Carioca from Brazil and a new companion, the pistol-toting rooster Panchito Pistoles from Mexico.

== Plot ==
It is Friday the 13th, Donald Duck's birthday. He receives three presents from friends in Latin America. Firstly a film projector, showing a documentary about birds. It tells the story of Pablo, a penguin fed up with the freezing conditions of the South Pole and traveling up the coast of Chile seeking warmer weather, ending up on the Galápagos Islands. The documentary details some of the birds of Latin America including the Aracuan Bird, before a man narrates a story about a boy from Uruguay who befriends a donkey with a condor's wings.

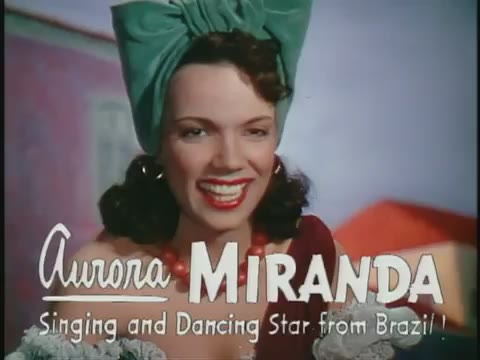
Brazilian singer Aurora Miranda in The Three Caballeros.

Next present is a pop-up book from José of Brazil which tells of Bahia, one of Brazil's states. José shrinks himself and Donald so that they can enter the book. They meet the locals, who dance a samba, and Donald pines for Yaya the Quindim seller.

Returning to normal size, Donald meets Panchito, of Mexico. The trio take the name "The Three Caballeros" and meet a group of Mexican children who re-enact the journey of Mary and Joseph searching for room at the inn. When offered shelter in a stable, the festivities include the breaking of the piñata. Panchito gives Donald a piñata and tells him of the tradition behind it. José and Panchito blindfold Donald to have him break open the piñata.

Panchito gives Donald and José a tour of Mexico on a flying serape, learning Mexican dances and songs. Donald fruitlessly pursues more women and ends up kissing José while blindfolded. Donald goes into a surreal reverie of sugar rush colors, flowers, singing, and dancing. He falls in love with singer Dora Luz and dances with Carmen Molina to the songs "La Zandunga" and "Jesusita en Chihuahua".

The celebration ends with Donald chased by firecrackers in the shape of a toy bull, which José lights with his cigar.

Throughout the film, the Aracuan Bird appears at random moments. He taunts everyone, sometimes stealing José's cigar and trying to make José jealous. He re-routes a train that Donald and José are riding on by drawing new tracks, causing the train to disassemble.

== Cast ==
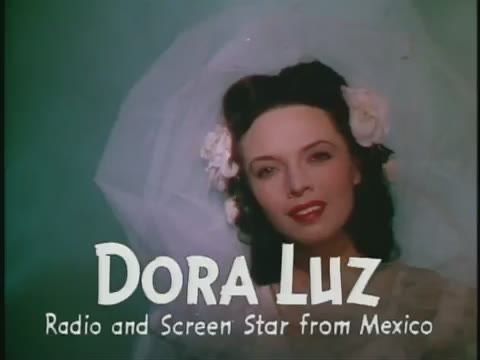
Mexican singer Dora Luz in the film.

- Clarence Nash as Donald Duck
- José do Patrocínio Oliveira as José Carioca
- Joaquin Garay as Panchito Pistoles
- Almirante as the Aracuan Bird
- Aurora Miranda as Yaya
- Dora Luz as herself
- Carmen Molina as herself
- Sterling Holloway as the Narrator (Pablo the Cold-Blooded Penguin)
- Frank Graham as the Narrator
- Fred Shields as the Narrator (The Flying Gauchito) (Spanish with a Mexican accent)
- Francisco "Frank" Mayorga as the Mexican Guitarist
- Nestor Amaral as José Carioca's singing voice (Baía) / Man with oranges (Baía)
- Trío Calaveras
- Trío Ascencio del Río
- Padua Hills Player
- Carlos Ramírez – Mexico

== Background ==
The Good Neighbor policy was a campaign by the United States to improve its relations with Latin America. A special concern in the late 1930s was the mounting program of Nazi propaganda designed to increase Nazism in the Americas, which would weaken US control and divide the Americas. To counter the Nazis, President Franklin Delano Roosevelt founded in 1940–1941 the Office of the Coordinator of Inter-American Affairs through which US propaganda efforts could be coordinated. Chief Coordinator Nelson Rockefeller asked Walt Disney to produce a few short films with themes friendly to Latin America, and Disney traveled to Brazil with a creative team to collect images and inspire ideas for such films.

The first Disney product of this propaganda program was the animated film Saludos Amigos in 1942. This film introduced the character José Carioca—a Brazilian businessman taking the form of a parrot—who led Donald Duck around South America. The next major film was The Three Caballeros which brought together Donald Duck, José Carioca, and a new character from Mexico: Panchito Pistoles, a gun-toting revolutionary rooster. These Disney films were much more successful than previous propaganda efforts.

== Release ==
=== Theatrical ===
Original theatrical trailer

The film's world premiere took place in Mexico City on December 21, 1944. It was released in the United States on February 3, 1945, and in the United Kingdom in March of that year.

The Three Caballeros was re-released in theaters on April 15, 1977. For this re-issue, the film was edited significantly and re-released in featurette form at 41 minutes, to accompany a re-issue of Never a Dull Moment.

=== Television ===
For the film's television premiere, The Three Caballeros aired as the ninth episode of the first season of ABC's Disneyland television series. Edited, shortened, and re-titled A Present for Donald for this December 22, 1954, broadcast and subsequent re-runs, Donald receives gifts from his friends for Christmas, instead of for his birthday as in the original.

=== Home media ===
- November 19, 1982 (VHS and Betamax)
- October 4, 1988 (VHS, Betamax and LaserDisc)
- October 28, 1994 (VHS and LaserDisc – Walt Disney Masterpiece Collection)
- 1995 (LaserDisc – Exclusive Archive Collection)
- May 2, 2000 (VHS and DVD – Walt Disney Gold Classic Collection)
- April 29, 2008 (DVD – Classic Caballeros Collection)
- January 30, 2018 (Blu-ray – 75th Anniversary Edition 2-Movie Collection)

== Box office ==
The film returned rentals to RKO by 1951 of $3,355,000 with $1,595,000 being generated in the U.S. and Canada. The film generated in excess of $700,000 in Mexico.

== Critical reception ==
The Three Caballeros received mixed reviews upon its original release. Most critics were relatively perplexed by the "technological razzle-dazzle" of the film, thinking that, in contrast to the previous feature films up to this time, "it displayed more flash than substance, more technique than artistry." Bosley Crowther for one wrote in The New York Times, "Dizzy Disney and his playmates have let their technical talents run wild." Other reviewers were taken aback by the sexual dynamics of the film, particularly the idea of Donald Duck lusting towards flesh-and-blood women. As Wolcott Gibbs put it in a negative review of the film for The New Yorker, such a concept "is one of those things that might disconcert less squeamish authorities than the Hays office. It might even be said that a sequence involving the duck, the young lady, and a long alley of animated cactus plants would probably be considered suggestive in a less innocent medium."

The film holds an 84% approval rating on Rotten Tomatoes based on 19 reviews, with an average score of 6.50/10. The site's consensus reads, "One of Disney's more abstract creations, The Three Caballeros is a dazzling, colorful picture that shows the company at an artistic acme."

=== Accolades ===
Award	Category	Nominee(s)	Result	Ref.
Academy Awards	Best Scoring of a Musical Picture	Edward H. Plumb, Paul Smith and Charles Wolcott	Nominated	
Academy Awards	Best Sound Recording	C. O. Slyfield	Nominated	
Venice International Film Festival	Golden Lion	Walt Disney	Nominated	

== Music ==
The Three Caballeros

Film score by Edward H. Plumb, Paul J. Smith, and Charles Wolcott
- Released: 1945
- Label: Disneyland Records

The film's original score was composed by Edward H. Plumb, Paul J. Smith, and Charles Wolcott.

- The title song, "The Three Caballeros", based its melody on "Ay, Jalisco, no te rajes!", a Mexican song composed by Manuel Esperón with lyrics by Ernesto Cortázar. "Ay, Jalisco, no te rajes!" was originally released in a 1941 film of the same name, starring Jorge Negrete. After seeing Manuel Esperón's success in the Mexican film industry, Walt Disney called him personally to ask him to participate in the film. New English lyrics were written to the song by Ray Gilbert.
- "Baía" based its melody on the Brazilian song "Na Baixa do Sapateiro" which was written by Ary Barroso and first released in 1938. New English lyrics were written by Ray Gilbert. Another Ary Barroso song, "Aquarela do Brasil", was featured in the earlier film Saludos Amigos with its original Portuguese lyrics.
- "Have You Been to Bahia?" was written by Dorival Caymmi and was originally released in 1941. The song was translated into English with no major changes, other than replacing the word "nega" (a woman of African descent) with "Donald", to whom the song is addressed in the film. Parts of the song are still sung in its original Portuguese.
- "Pandeiro & Flute" was written by Benedito Lacerda, and is played during the Baia train sequence. It is the opinion of Disney's Chief Archivist Emeritus, Dave Smith, that the piece was not written originally for the film, but was instead licensed to Disney; however, he is unaware of any evidence that proves this opinion. The piece was developed by Charles Wolcott, and Lacerda went uncredited in the film.
- "Os Quindins de Yayá" was written by Ary Barroso and first released in 1941. Unlike Barroso's other song to be featured in this film, "Os Quindins de Yayá" was left in its original Portuguese. The song is sung by Aurora Miranda in the film.
- "Os Quindins de Yayá" is briefly interrupted by Nestor Amaral singing a small portion of "Pregões Cariocas" which was written by Braguinha in 1931. This song was first recorded under the name "Cena Carioca" and came to be known as "Pregões Cariocas" in 1936.
- "Mexico" was composed by Charles Wolcott with lyrics by Ray Gilbert and was sung by Carlos Ramírez. It is the only song in the film to be completely original.
- The "Jarabe Pateño" was written by Jonás Yeverino Cárdenas in 1900. It is considered one of the most famous compositions from the Mexican state of Coahuila.
- "Lilongo" was written by Felipe "El Charro" Gil and copyrighted in the U.S. in 1946, though it was first recorded in the U.S. in 1938. It is performed by Trío Calaveras in the film.
- "You Belong to My Heart" based its melody on the Mexican song "Solamente una vez", which was written by Agustín Lara. Like "Ay, Jalisco, no te rajes!" and "Na Baixa do Sapateiro", new English lyrics were written to the song by Ray Gilbert.
- "La Zandunga" (also spelled "La Sandunga") is a traditional Mexican song and the unofficial anthem of the Isthmus of Tehuantepec, in the Mexican state of Oaxaca. The melody is believed to have originated from Andalusia and was rearranged by Andres Gutierrez. Lyrics were written to it by Máximo Ramó Ortiz in 1853. It was arranged for this film by Charles Wolcott.
- The instrumental composition which plays while the cacti are dancing is "Jesusita en Chihuahua", a trademark of the Mexican Revolution which was written by Quirino Mendoza y Cortés in 1916. Over time this piece has also come to be known under the names "J.C. Polka", "Jesse Polka", and "Cactus Polka".
- The instrumental composition "Sobre las olas" ("Over the Waves") written by Mexican songwriter Juventino Rosas and first published in 1888 can be heard in the film's score during "The Cold-Blooded Penguin" segment while Pablo the penguin is sailing to the Galápagos Islands. A small portion of "Jingle Bells" is briefly sung by Donald Duck.
- "Babalu" by Desi Arnaz is used briefly.
- The title song from Saludos Amigos is heard instrumentally when Donald first opens his presents.

== Other media ==
- The Aracuan Bird later made an appearance in the 1947 short film Clown of the Jungle, where it constantly interrupts Donald's attempts to photograph birds in a South American jungle.
- Agustín Lara's song "You Belong to My Heart" was featured in a Disney short called Pluto's Blue Note (1947). It was later recorded by Bing Crosby. Ary Barroso's song "Bahia" and the title song became popular hit tunes in the 1940s. The complete "Bahia" sequence was cut from the 1977 theatrical reissue of the film.
- One of the scenes of the former Mickey Mouse Revue features Donald, Jose and Panchito in the show, performing the film's theme song. In the queue for Mickey's PhilharMagic, there is a poster for "Festival de los Mariachis", which also features the three protagonists. They also appear in some of Disney's themed resorts, such as Disney's Coronado Springs Resort where one can find topiaries of the trio, and Disney's All-Star Music Resort where a fountain depicting the trio is the centrepiece of the Guitar-shaped Calypso Pool.
- Some clips from this film were used in the "Welcome to Rio" portion of the Mickey Mouse Disco music video.
- Fictional music group Alvin and the Chipmunks covered the title song, "The Three Caballeros", for their 1995 Disney-themed album When You Wish Upon a Chipmunk; however, The Walt Disney Company neither sponsored nor endorsed the album the song was featured on.
- Don Rosa wrote and drew two comic book sequels: The Three Caballeros Ride Again (2000) and The Magnificent Seven (Minus 4) Caballeros (2005).
- In February 2001, José and Panchito performed with Donald in the House of Mouse episode "The Three Caballeros", voiced by Carlos Alazraqui (Pistoles) and Rob Paulsen (Carioca), appearing as recurring characters after that. In 2015, also makes an appearance in Mickey Mouse episode "¡Feliz Cumpleaños!" as performers at Mickey's birthday. The pair later appeared in the Mickey and the Roadster Racers episode "Mickey's Perfecto Day", in which they are former bandmates of Donald's who perform a concert with Daisy Duck after Donald is unable to take part.
- In September 2006, Panchito and José returned to Walt Disney World where they appeared for meet and greets. They were only found outside the Mexico pavilion in World Showcase at Epcot. Donald also appeared with them.
- In April 2007, the film became the basis for a ride at the Mexican pavilion at Walt Disney World's Epcot named Gran Fiesta Tour Starring The Three Caballeros.
- The 2011 Mickey's Soundsational Parade at Disneyland features all three Caballeros and the Aracuan Bird in one parade unit.
- Along with many other Disney characters, Panchito, José, and Donald appear in the updated It's a Small World ride at Disneyland during the section portraying Mexico.
- On June 9, 2018, a new show called Legend of the Three Caballeros was produced by Disney Interactive focusing on crazy adventures and was first released on the DisneyLife app in the Philippines. It produced 13 episodes.
- José and Panchito make appearances in the 2017 DuckTales reboot, with Bernardo De Paula as José and Arturo Del Puerto as Panchito.

== See also ==
- Walt & El Grupo, a 2008 documentary film about the making of The Three Caballeros
- 1944 in film
- List of American films of 1944
- List of Walt Disney Pictures films
- List of Disney theatrical animated features
- List of animated feature films of the 1940s
- List of highest-grossing animated films
- List of films with live action and animation
- List of package films
