= Aurora Miranda =

Brazilian singer, dancer, and actress (1915–2005)

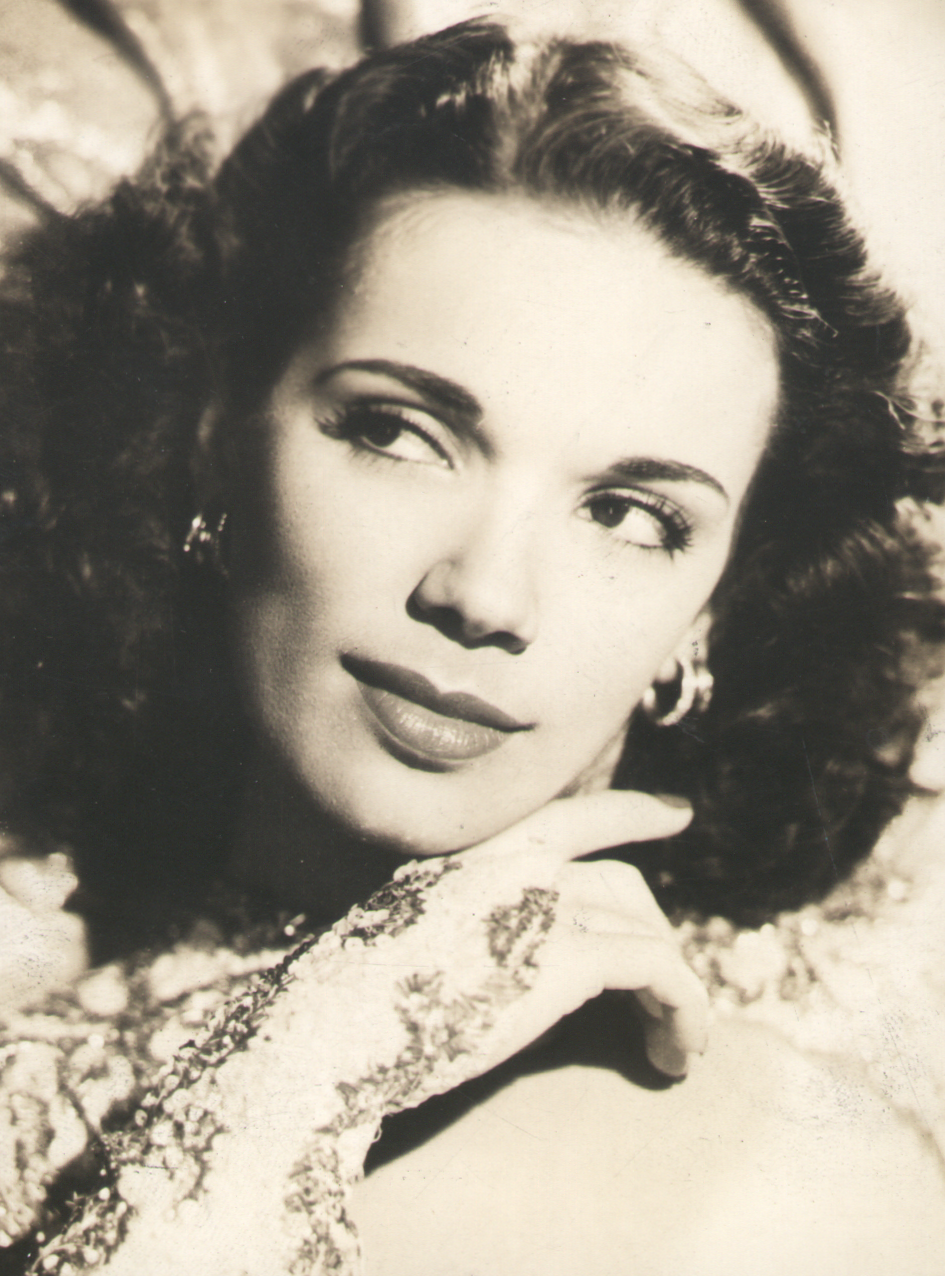
- Miranda in the 1940s
- Born: Aurora Miranda da Cunha; 20 April 1915; Rio de Janeiro, Brazil
- Died: 22 December 2005 (aged 90); Rio de Janeiro, Brazil
- Resting place: São João Batista Cemetery, Rio de Janeiro, Brazil
- Occupations: Singer, dancer, actress
- Years active: 1933–1990
- Spouse: Gabriel Richaid (m. 1940; died 1990)
- Children: 2
- Relatives: Amaro da Cunha (brother); Carmen Miranda (sister); Cecilia Miranda de Carvalho (sister)

Aurora Miranda da Cunha Richaid (20 April 1915 – 22 December 2005) was a Brazilian singer and actress. She began her career at the age of 18 in 1933. Miranda appeared in several films, including The Three Caballeros, where she danced with Donald Duck and José Carioca, singing the song, "Os Quindins de Yayá". Her sisters were Carmen Miranda and Cecilia Miranda.

== Career ==
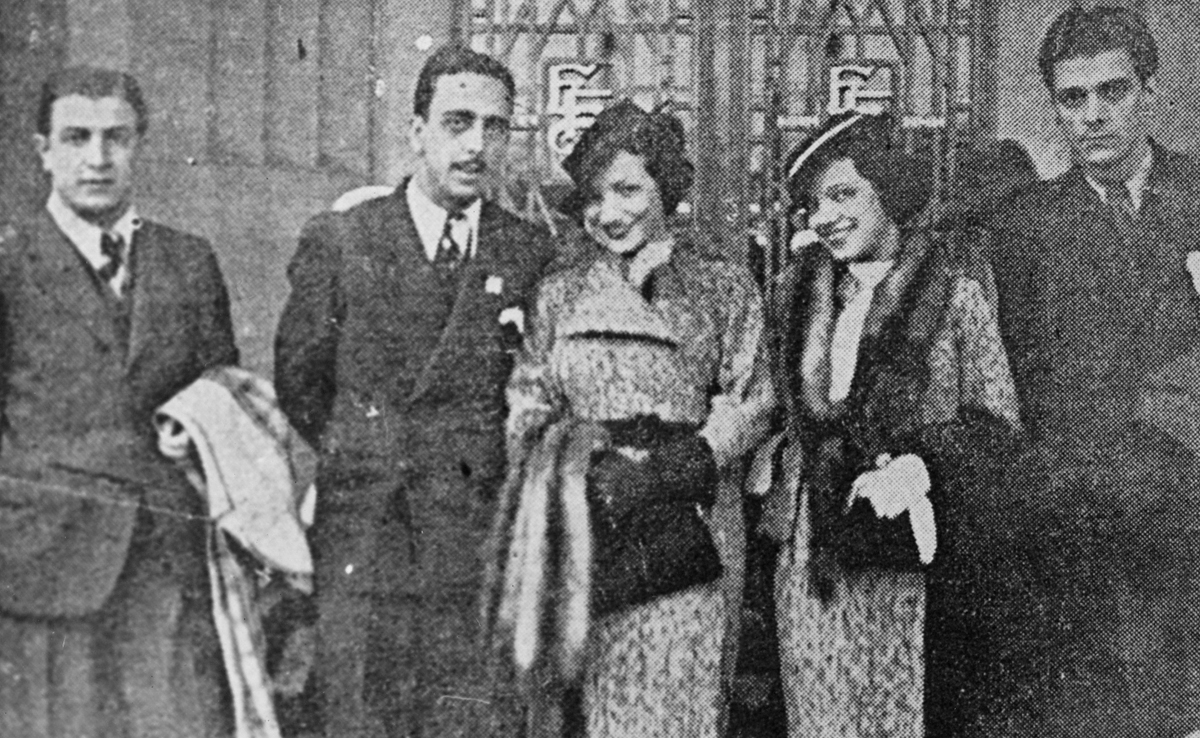
Carmen Miranda (center) and Aurora in São Paulo (1934)

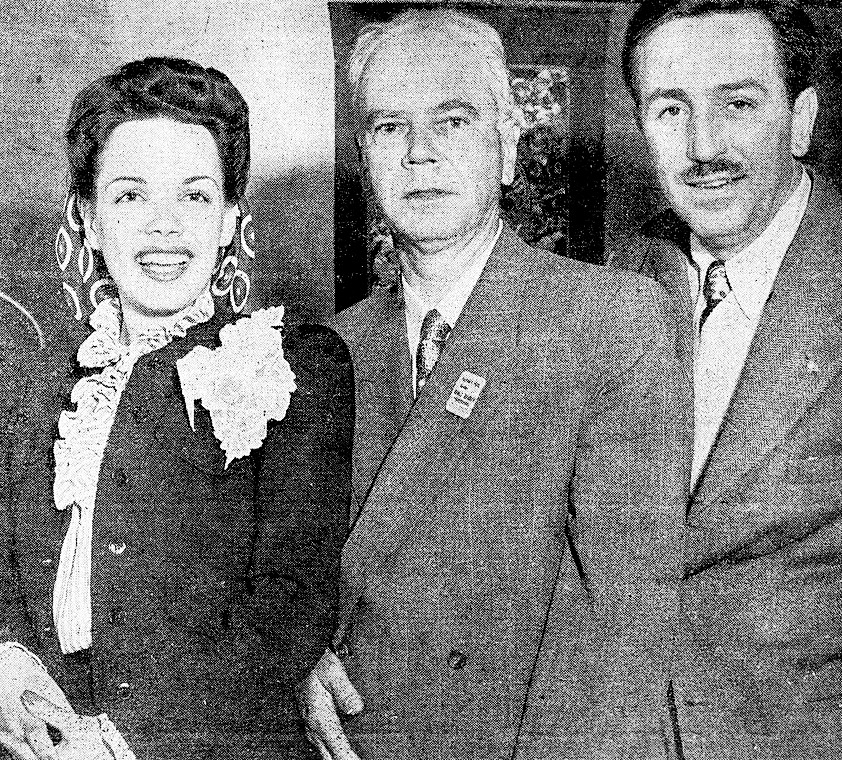
Aurora Miranda with Walt Disney (1943).

Aurora Miranda had a successful career in Brazil and the US, perhaps overshadowed by that of her sister, Carmen Miranda. Aurora was six years younger than her sister.

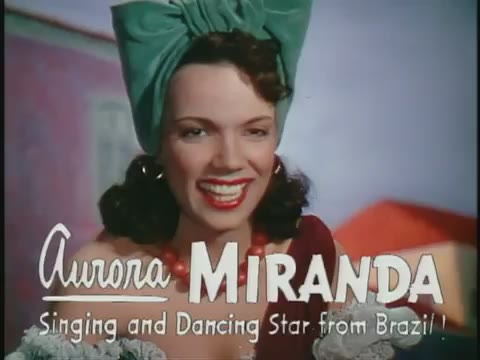
Miranda in The Three Caballeros (1944)

In 1932, aged 18, she was asked to perform on the Mayrink Veiga radio station by Josué de Barros, the same composer who had launched her sister's career three years earlier. Soon she was snapped up by a rival station and within 12 months she had released her first record, Cai, Cai, Balão ("Drop, Drop Balloon") alongside the crooner then considered Brazil's rei da voz or "king of the voice", Francisco Alves. Alves was known for supporting up-and-coming artists such as Miranda.

Years later, she appeared in the documentaries Once Upon a Mouse and Carmen Miranda: Bananas is My Business.

Miranda died at the age of 90 on 22 December 2005.

== Personal life ==
In 1940, she married Gabriel Richaid clad in a gold-embroidered wedding dress shipped from the US by Carmen.

Unlike her sister, Aurora preferred married life to her career. In 1951 she returned to Rio and settled down as a wife and mother. She often spoke of her sister Carmen and appeared in many documentaries.

== Legacy ==
Aurora Miranda carved out her own niche, first as a pioneering singer and later as one of the first human beings to interact with cartoons in a sound movie. She appeared in the Walt Disney production The Three Caballeros, a mix of cinema and animation in which Aurora starred alongside Donald Duck.

But perhaps her greatest legacy was the first recording of Rio de Janeiro's unofficial anthem, Cidade Maravilhosa (Marvellous City), in 1934.

Tom Philips wrote in The Guardian that Aurora Miranda "personified the spirit of Rio."

== Filmography ==
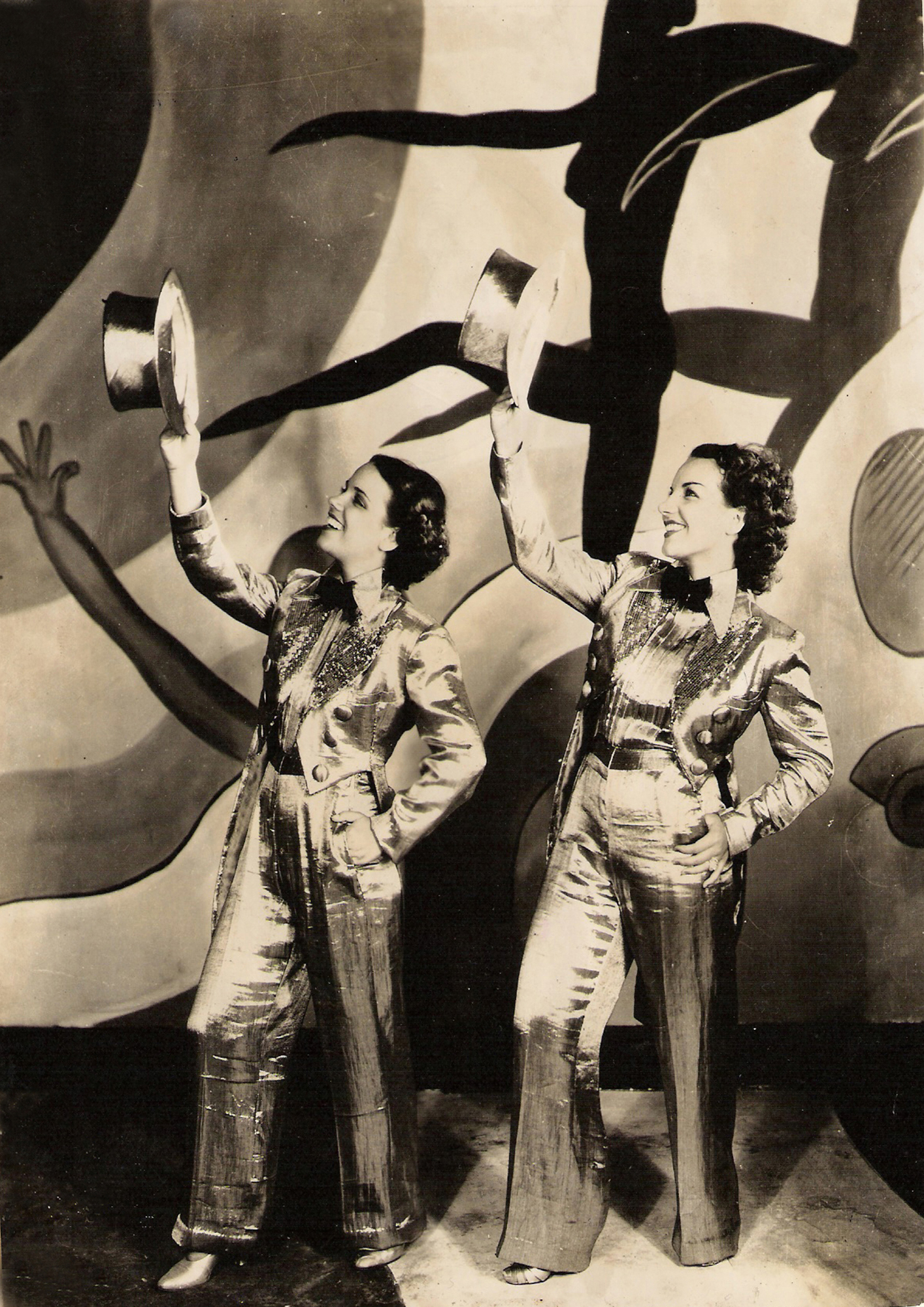
Aurora with Carmen Miranda in Alô, Alô Carnaval (1936).

Year	Title	Role	Notes
1935	Alô, Alô, Brasil!		Performer: "Cidade Maravilhosa" and "Ladrãozinho"
1935	Estudantes	Herself	Performer: "Onde Está o Seu Carneirinho?" and "Linda Ninon"
1936	Hello, Hello, Carnival!		Performer: "Cantores do Rádio" and "Molha o Pano"
1939	Banana da Terra	Herself	Performer: "Menina do Regimento"
1944	Phantom Lady	Estela Monteiro	
1944	The Conspirators	Fado Singer	Uncredited
1944	Brazil	Bailarina, Specialty Dancer	
1944	The Three Caballeros	Yaya	(as Aurora Miranda of Brazil)
1945	Tell It to a Star	Specialty Act	
1954	Disneyland	Brazilian Girl	Voice, A Present for Donald (archive footage)
1978	Mulheres de Cinema	Herself	(archive footage) (Documentary short)
1981	Once Upon a Mouse	Herself	
1989	Dias Melhores Virão	Herself	(final film role)
1995	Carmen Miranda: Bananas is my Business	Herself	Documentary
2009	Cantoras do Rádio - O Filme	Herself	(archive footage)

== See also ==
- Carioca
