= Come to the Stable =

1949 film by Henry Koster

- Directed by: Henry Koster
- Screenplay by: Oscar Millard; Sally Benson
- Story by: Clare Boothe Luce
- Produced by: Samuel G. Engel
- Starring: Loretta Young; Celeste Holm
- Cinematography: Joseph LaShelle
- Edited by: William H. Reynolds
- Music by: Cyril J. Mockridge
- Distributed by: 20th Century Fox
- Release date: July 27, 1949 (New York)
- Running time: 94 minutes
- Country: United States
- Languages: English; French
- Box office: $3 million

Come to the Stable is a 1949 American comedy drama film that tells how two French religious sisters come to a small New England town and involve the townsfolk in helping them to build a children's hospital. It features Loretta Young, Celeste Holm, Hugh Marlowe, Elsa Lanchester, Thomas Gomez, Dooley Wilson and Regis Toomey.

The movie was based on a story by Clare Boothe Luce, and the screenplay was written by Oscar Millard and Sally Benson. It was directed by Henry Koster. It was nominated for Academy Awards for Best Actress in a Leading Role (Loretta Young), Best Actress in a Supporting Role (Celeste Holm and Elsa Lanchester), Best Art Direction-Set Decoration, Black-and-White (Lyle R. Wheeler, Joseph C. Wright, Thomas Little, and Paul S. Fox), Best Cinematography, Best Music, Song (Alfred Newman and Mack Gordon for "Through a Long and Sleepless Night") and Best Writing, Motion Picture Story.

== Plot ==
One winter's night, two French sisters, Chicago-born Sister Margaret (Loretta Young) and Sister Scholastica (Celeste Holm), arrive at the small New England town of Bethlehem where they meet Amelia Potts (Elsa Lanchester), a painter of religious pictures. The sisters announce that they have come to build a hospital, and Sister Margaret explains that she was in charge of a children's hospital in Normandy during the war when it became a potential target during a military campaign. As many of the children could not be evacuated, Sister Margaret made a personal plea to an American general not to shell the hospital, which the Germans were using as an observation post. The hospital was spared but at the cost of American lives, and Sister Margaret made a promise to God that, in gratitude for saving the children, she would return to America to build a children's hospital.

Miss Potts wonders why they chose Bethlehem, and Sister Margaret says that they had received a postcard with a reproduction of a nativity scene painted by Miss Potts, titled "Come to the Stable," with information about the Bethlehem area. The sisters then decide that a local hill depicted in another of Miss Potts' paintings would be a good site for the hospital.

After composer Bob Masen (Hugh Marlowe), who is Miss Potts's neighbor and landlord, tells the sisters that the hill is owned by Luigi Rossi of New York, the sisters visit the local Catholic Bishop to seek his support for their planned project. He is unable to help them with their project, but does give them a small amount of money to tide them over. When they return to Bethlehem, Bob's religious porter, Anthony James, offers them a ride from the railroad station in Bob's jeep (he continues to help them throughout the movie).

As Sister Margaret learned to drive a jeep during the war, they arrange to borrow the jeep to go to New York City to find Mr. Rossi and ask him to donate his land. Rossi runs a bookmaker operation and, despite his security, the sisters manage to see him. He tells the sisters that he intends to build his retirement home on the site. As they prepare to leave, Sister Margaret notices a picture, and they learn that Rossi's son was killed in action near their hospital in Rouen. The sisters then tell Luigi they will pray for his son. Suddenly, Rossi changes his mind and informs them that the land is theirs if they will install a stained glass window in the future hospital in memory of his son.

Elated, they return to Bethlehem, where Bob and his girlfriend, Kitty Blaine, are listening to a demo of a new song he has composed and the sisters come to thank him for the use of the jeep. Bob then announces that he will be going to Hollywood for twelve weeks to work on a motion picture.

The sisters acquire a three-month option for $5,000 on a former witch-hazel bottling plant opposite the Rossi property for use as a temporary shelter to stage the construction of the hospital. However, when the bishop looks over the papers, he discovers that the purchase price carries a $25,000 mortgage, significantly more than the operating funds the sisters have available. He tells the sisters that he will have to cancel the contract, but at that moment, 11 more sisters and a chaplain arrive from France, having been previously summoned by the sisters following their initial success. The bishop relents, allowing them to stay for the period of the option with the understanding that they must all leave if they cannot raise the additional money within that time, but later remarks to his monsignor assistant that he feels unstoppable forces at work.

When Bob returns from Hollywood with Kitty and three house guests he discovers the now increased number of sisters having a produce-and-arts sale in Miss Potts' yard, and Bob insists that she evict all the sisters - which is unnecessary, as they are planning to move into the abandoned bottling plant in anticipation of finalizing its purchase. On the day before the option is to lapse, the sisters find themselves $500 short of the necessary amount. That evening, after Kitty performs Bob's new song for his guests, they hear the sisters singing a hymn the tune of which is similar to Bob's song. Concerned about potential allegations of plagiarism, Bob swears that he first thought of the tune after his Army outfit landed in France four years earlier, but guest Al Newman, a music critic, identifies the melody as a 1200-year-old Gregorian Chant.

The next morning, Sisters Margaret and Scholastica accidentally drive a stake through Bob's waterline while building a shrine, and mistake the resulting gusher as a holy sign. Bob visits the real estate agent and arranges to buy the witch-hazel plant in order to keep it out of the sisters' hands. Sister Margaret, meanwhile, discovers Bob's guests playing doubles tennis and arranges a wager for $500 if Sister Scholastica can help Al beat the other couple. Although Sister Scholastica is a former tennis champion, they lose the match.

Later, after Sister Margaret tells the sisters that they must leave, Bob apologetically comes to bid them goodbye and overhears their prayers, discovering that their Mother House is in Normandy, near where he was stationed during the war. When the sisters ask him to pray for them, Bob is moved to change his mind about their project, and the film ends with Bob, Kitty, Anthony, Miss Potts, Mr. Rossi and the bishop all attending the dedication of the temporary home of the hospital of St. Jude.

== Cast ==
- Loretta Young as Sister Margaret (based on Mother Benedict Duss)
- Celeste Holm as Sister Scholastica (based on Sister Mary-Aline Trilles de Warren)
- Elsa Lanchester as Amelia Potts (based on artist Lauren Ford)
- Hugh Marlowe as Robert Masen
- Thomas Gomez as Luigi Rossi
- Dorothy Patrick as Kitty
- Basil Ruysdael as The Bishop
- Dooley Wilson as Anthony James
- Regis Toomey as Monsignor Talbot
- Mike Mazurki as Sam
- Wally Brown as Howard Sheldon
- Walter Baldwin as Claude Jarman
- John Bleifer as Rosey (uncredited)

== Release ==
The film had its premiere at the Rivoli Theatre in New York City on July 27, 1949, before opening to the public the following day.

== Awards and nominations ==
Award	Category	Nominee(s)	Result	Ref.
Academy Awards	Best Actress	Loretta Young	Nominated	
Academy Awards	Best Supporting Actress	Celeste Holm	Nominated	
Academy Awards	Best Supporting Actress	Elsa Lanchester	Nominated	
Academy Awards	Best Motion Picture Story	Clare Boothe Luce	Nominated	
Academy Awards	Best Art Direction-Set Decoration – Black-and-White	Art Direction: Lyle R. Wheeler and Joseph C. Wright; Set Decoration: Thomas Little and Paul S. Fox	Nominated	
Academy Awards	Best Cinematography – Black-and-White	Joseph LaShelle	Nominated	
Academy Awards	Best Original Song	"Through a Long and Sleepless Night"; Music by Alfred Newman; Lyrics by Mack Gordon	Nominated	
Golden Globe Awards	Best Picture		Nominated	
Writers Guild of America Awards	Best Written American Comedy	Oscar Millard and Sally Benson	Nominated	

== See also ==
- Abbey of Regina Laudis
