= Melanie von Nagel =

German-born baroness, literary translator, poet and Roman Catholic nun (1908–2006)

Melanie von Nagel, from a portrait made in the 1940s

Melanie von Nagel (May 12, 1908 — June 27, 2006), known as Muska Nagel and in religion Mother Jerome von Nagel Mussayassul O.S.B., was a German-born baroness, literary translator, poet, and Roman Catholic nun at the Benedictine Abbey of Regina Laudis in Bethlehem, Connecticut.

== Early life ==
Melanie Olivia Julie von Nagel zu Aichberg was born in Berlin, the daughter of General Major Karl Freiherr von Nagel and Mabel Dillon Nesmith von Nagel. Her father was Commander of the Bavarian First Heavy Cavalry Regiment and Chamberlain at the Bavarian Court; her mother was American, from New York. "Muska" Nagel was raised in Bavaria until her father's death in 1919. In widowhood Mabel von Nagel lived with her three daughters in Cairo and Florence.

== Marriage ==
Melanie von Nagel lived in Munich during World War II, writing book reviews for Die Literatur. In 1944, she married Halil-beg Mussayassul, a Muslim portrait artist from Dagestan, based in Munich. During and after the war, they hosted Russian refugees and used their language skills to help in camps for displaced persons. The couple moved to New York in 1940s, and Halil-beg Mussayassul died there in 1949.

== Literary career ==
As Muska Nagel, she published poetry and translations, and was recognized as a scholar of Paul Celan, and Ivan Illich. "Poetry, the lyrical, especially the smaller poems, like intimate sighs — can unite across time and space in a sense of shared humanity," she explained of her love of poetry in 2004. Poet Constance Hunting was her close friend and publisher, and she was a longtime correspondent of Italian writer Nicola Chiaromonte, Books of poetry by Nagel included Things That Surround Us (1987), Elements (1990), and Letters to the Interior (1996).

== Religious life ==
In 1958, Nagel entered religious life as Sister Jerome at the Benedictine Abbey of Regina Laudis in Bethlehem, Connecticut. She was a member of the Regina Laudis community with Mother Benedict Duss and Dolores Hart, and she served on the committee to revise the abbey's constitution. She was also expert at dying and spinning sheep's wool from the abbey's farm.

Mother Jerome von Nagel Mussayassul died at the Abbey of Regina Laudis in 2006, aged 98 years. A biography of Mother Jerome, in German, was published in 2017. A collection of Nicola Chiaromonte's letters to Mother Jerome was published in Italian in 2013.
