= Cinecittà =

Film studio in Rome, Italy

Coordinates: 41°51′7″N 12°34′38″E

Cinecittà Studios
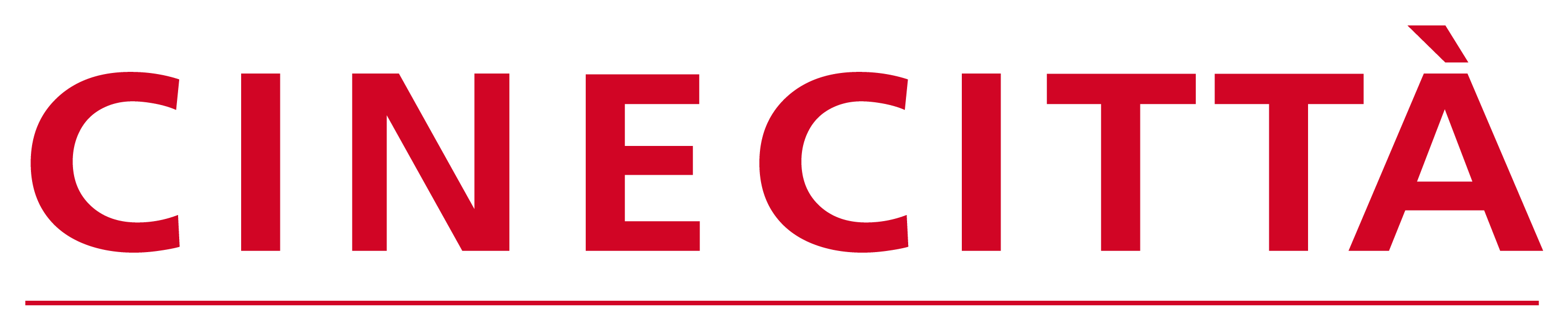

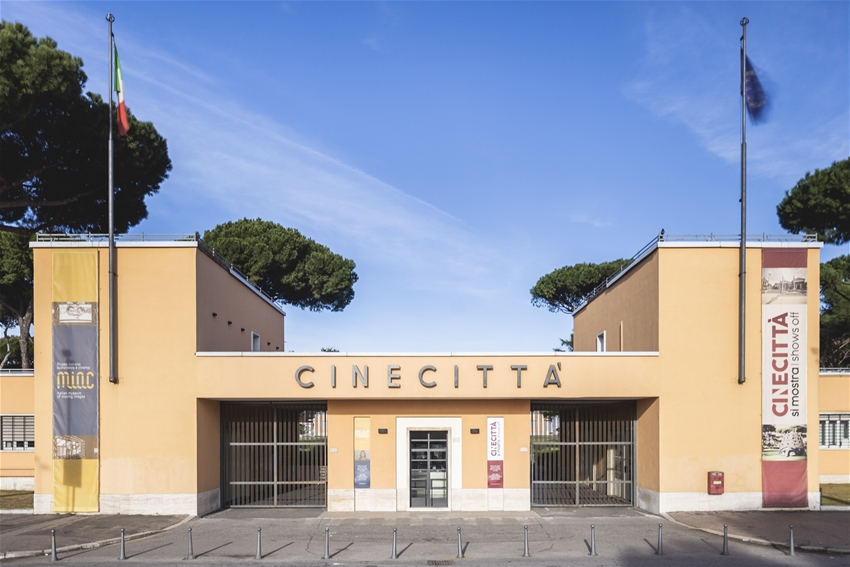
- Type: State-owned
- Industry: Film; media; amusement park
- Founded: 1937; 89 years ago
- Founder: Benito Mussolini
- Headquarters: Rome, Italy
- Website: cinecitta.com

Cinecittà (pronounced [ˌtʃinetʃitˈta]; Italian for 'Cinema City') is a large film studio in Rome, Italy. With an area of 400,000 square metres (99 acres), it is the largest film studio in Europe, and is considered the hub of Italian cinema. The studios were constructed during the Fascist era as part of a plan to revive the Italian film industry and to compete with Hollywood.

Filmmakers such as Federico Fellini, Roberto Rossellini, Luchino Visconti, Sergio Leone, Bernardo Bertolucci, Francis Ford Coppola, Martin Scorsese, Mel Gibson and Luca Guadagnino have worked at Cinecittà. More than 3,000 movies have been filmed there, of which 90 received an Academy Award nomination and 47 of these won it. In the 1950s, the number of international productions being made there led to Rome being dubbed "Hollywood on the Tiber".

== History ==
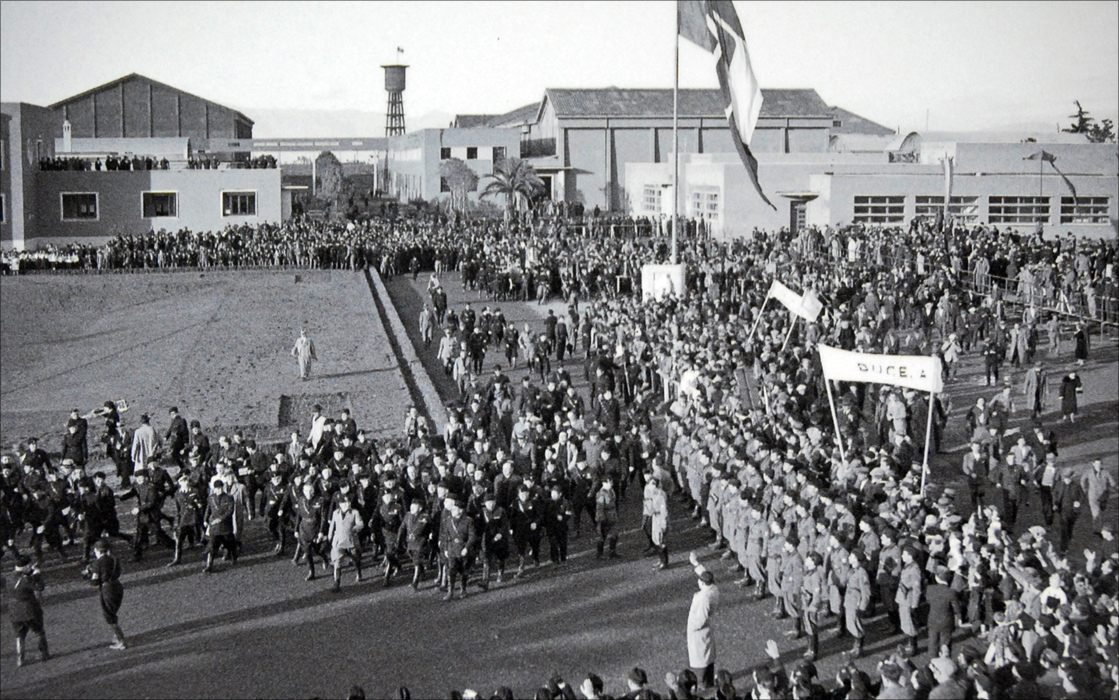
Inauguration of the studios in 1937

The studios were founded in 1937 by Benito Mussolini, his son Vittorio, and his head of cinema Luigi Freddi under the slogan "Il cinema è l'arma più forte" ("Cinema is the most powerful weapon"). The purpose was not only for propaganda, but also to support the recovering Italian feature film industry, which had reached its low point in 1931. Mussolini himself inaugurated the studios on 21 April 1937. Post-production units and sets were constructed and heavily used initially. Early films such as Scipio Africanus (1937) and The Iron Crown (1941) showcased the technological advancement of the studios. Seven thousand people were involved in the filming of the battle scene from Scipio Africanus, and live elephants were brought in as a part of the re-enactment of the Battle of Zama.

During World War II it became a German army barracks and was stripped of all electrical equipment with its sound stages smashed and gutted.

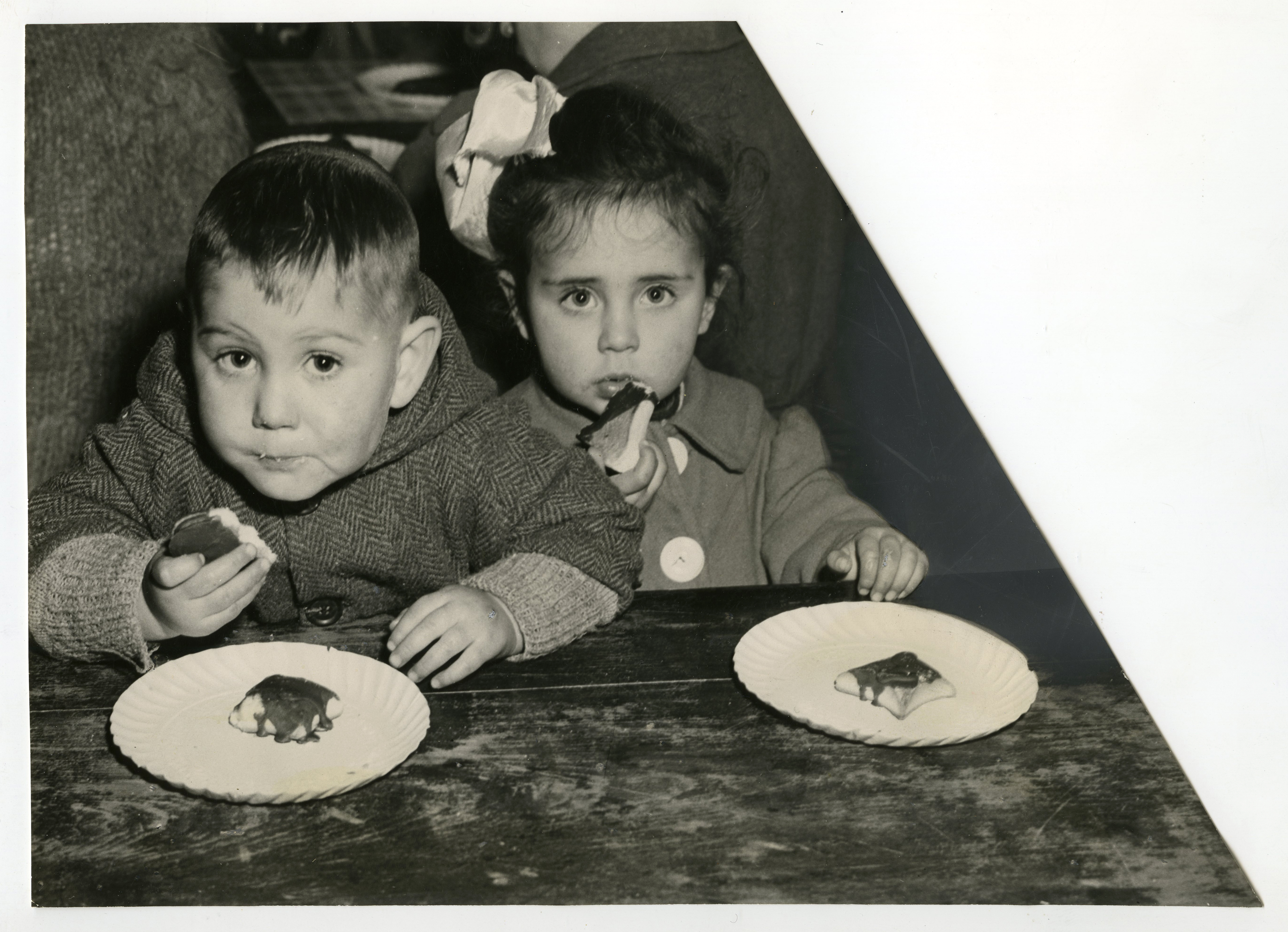
Refugees at the Cinecittà UNRRA displaced persons camp in 1946

From 1944 to 1950, the studios of Cinecittà were used as a refugee camp for displaced persons following German occupation and Allied bombing that damaged parts of the complex. An estimated 3,000 refugees lived there, divided into two camps: an Italian camp housing Italians as well as displaced people from Italian Libya and Dalmatia, and an international camp, including refugees from Yugoslavia, Poland, Egypt, Iran, and China.

After rebuilding in the postwar years by MGM's Henry Henigson for Quo Vadis, the studios were used once again for their post-production facilities. Cinecittà, described as Hollywood on the Tiber, was the location for several large American film productions, like Roman Holiday (1953), Beat the Devil (1953), The Barefoot Contessa (1954), Ben-Hur (1959), and some low-budget action pictures starring Lex Barker. Barker also featured in Federico Fellini's La Dolce Vita (1960) and the studios were for many years closely associated with Fellini.

In the same period, the studios were used for further international productions such as Francis of Assisi (1961), Cleopatra (1963), The Agony and the Ecstasy (1965), Zeffirelli's Romeo and Juliet (1968), Fellini's Casanova (1976), La Traviata (1982) and many other productions.

It hosted the Eurovision Song Contest 1991. This was the 36th Eurovision Song Contest and was held on Stage 15. Due to the Gulf War and mounting tensions in Yugoslavia, RAI decided to move the contest from Sanremo to Rome, which was perceived to be more secure.

After a period of near-bankruptcy, the Italian Government privatized Cinecittà in 1997, selling an 80% stake. On August 9, 2007, a fire destroyed about 3,000 m^{2} (32,000 sq. ft.) of the Cinecittà lot and surroundings. The historic part that houses the sets of classics such as Ben-Hur was not damaged; however, a good portion of the original sets from the HBO/BBC series Rome was destroyed. In July 2012, another fire damaged Teatro 5, the vast studio where Fellini filmed La Dolce Vita and Satyricon (1969). A third fire in August 2022 destroyed part of a partially dismantled set depicting Renaissance-era Florence and disrupted filming of the sequel to The Old Guard.

Since the 1990s, films have included Anthony Minghella's The English Patient (1996) and The Talented Mr. Ripley (1999), Martin Scorsese's Gangs of New York (2002), Wes Anderson's The Life Aquatic with Steve Zissou (2004), Mel Gibson's The Passion of the Christ (2004), Edward Berger's Conclave (2024), Luca Guadagnino's Queer (2024) and Terry Gilliam's Carnival: At the End of Days (TBA).

== Notable TV productions ==
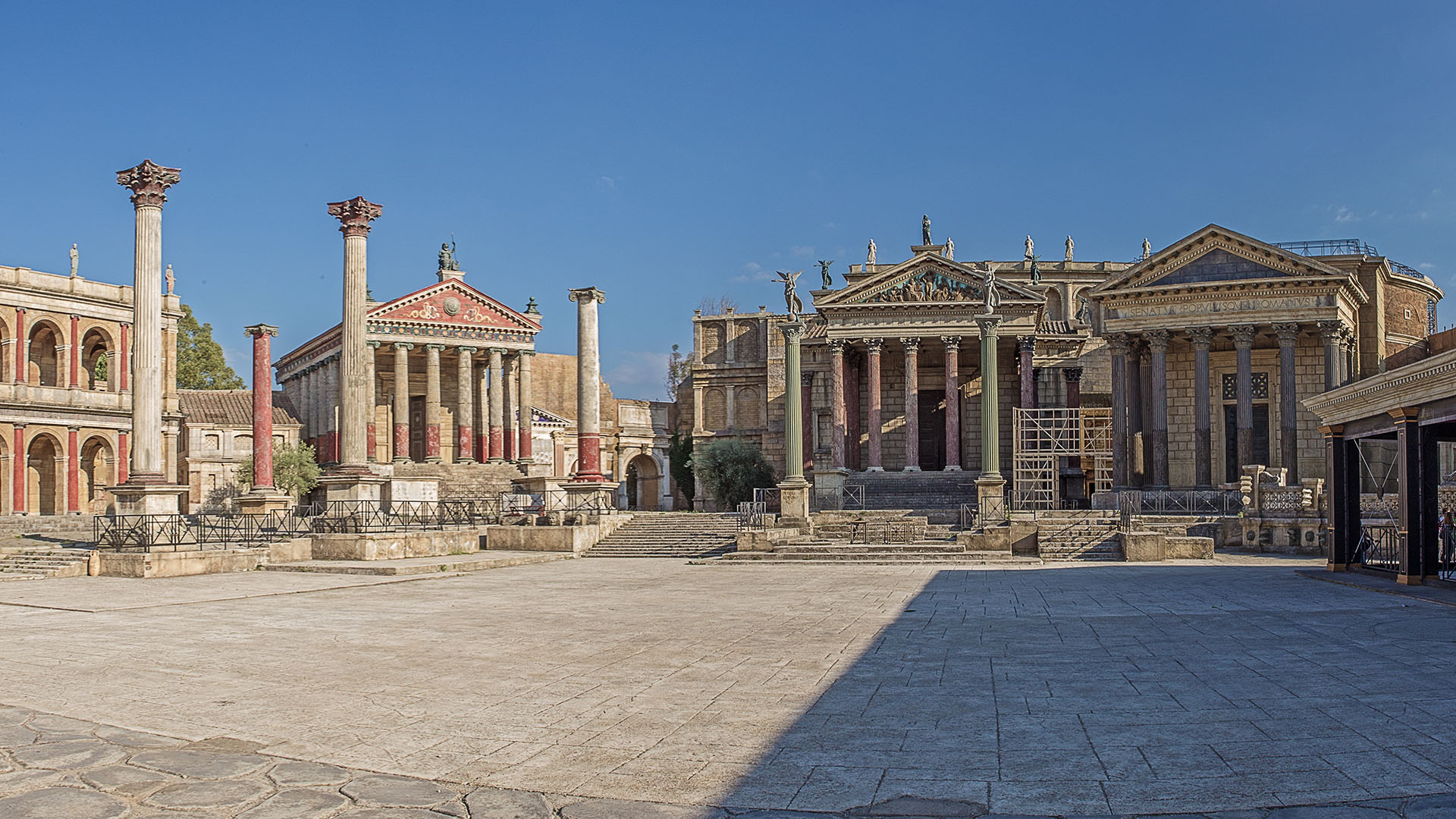
Set of the television series Rome (2004–2007)

Cinecittà also hosts TV productions, such as Grande Fratello, the Italian version of Big Brother, where the Big Brother house is built on Cinecittà's premises. The complex also hosted the Eurovision Song Contest 1991.

In addition, the BBC/HBO series Rome was filmed there from 2004 to 2007, the show being widely acclaimed for its sets and designs. BBC Wales reused some of these sets for an episode of the 2008 series of Doctor Who set in ancient Pompeii, and Alexandre Astier reused this set for the Book VI of his television series Kaamelott set in Ancient Rome.

More recently, Paolo Sorrentino's series The Young Pope and The New Pope were almost entirely shot at Cinecittà, including reconstruction of the interiors of the Sistine Chapel and Saint Peter's Basilica. The 2019 film The Two Popes sections of which were also shot at Cinecittà, again utilised a reconstruction of the Sistine Chapel.

== Future expansion ==
The new strategic and ambitious plan sets an unprecedented benchmark for Cinecittà's production capacity. Due to Investments from the PNRR, the construction of five new sound stages and the complete renovation of four technologically advanced stages will be completed by June 2026. This expansion will increase the total number of stages from 20 to 25, boosting production capacity by 25%.

Moreover, the confirmation of the 40% international tax credit - one of the most competitive in the world - further reinforces the Studios' attractiveness for foreign productions, adding to the 2025–2029 Plan designed to enhance management efficiency, ensure long-term stability, and optimize operational costs while mitigating market risks and stabilizing revenues.

== Cinecittà World ==
In 2009 the studio announced that they intended to create a theme park. The movie-themed amusement park, Cinecittà World, opened in July 2014. The €250 million theme park is located approximately 25 km (16 mi) southwest of Cinecittà studios, on the site of a former movie studio built by Dino De Laurentiis in the 1960s.

Cinecittà World was designed by Dante Ferretti, a production designer who has won three Academy Awards. Visitors enter Cinecittà World through the jaws of the Temple of Moloch, seen in Cabiria, a silent movie filmed in Turin in 1914. The theme park also features a recreation of 1920s-era Manhattan as envisioned by Ferretti.

Cinecittà World expects to have 1.5 million visitors annually. Expansion plans for the theme park include a nature reserve and a wellness center.

== Gallery ==
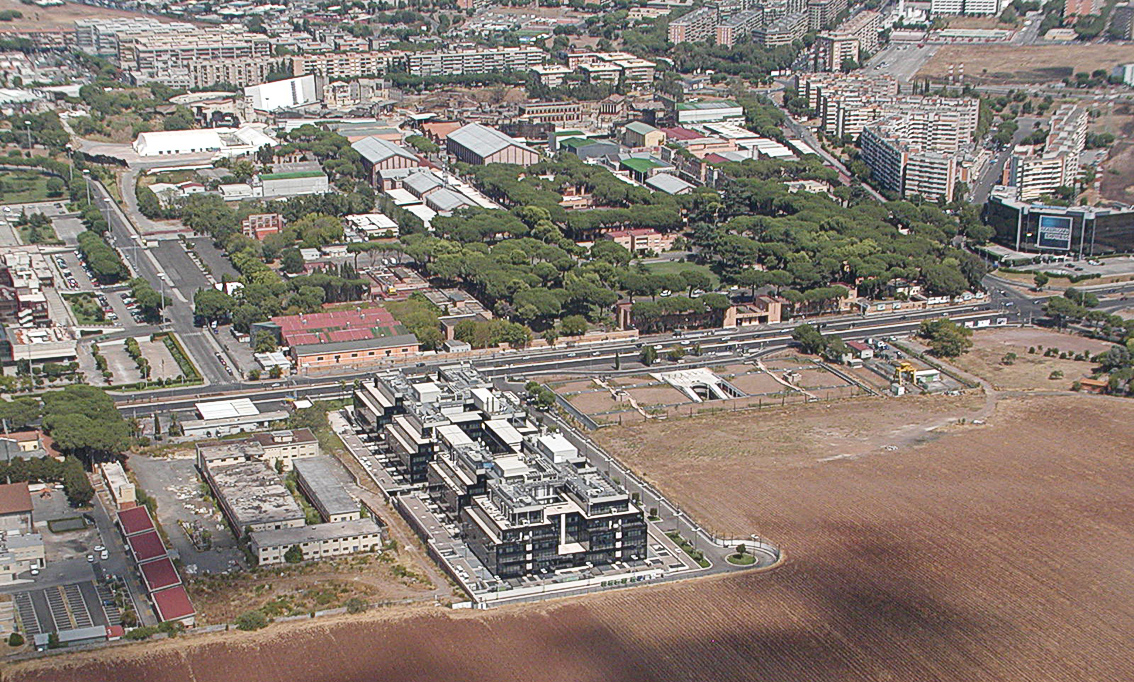
Panoramic view of Cinecittà

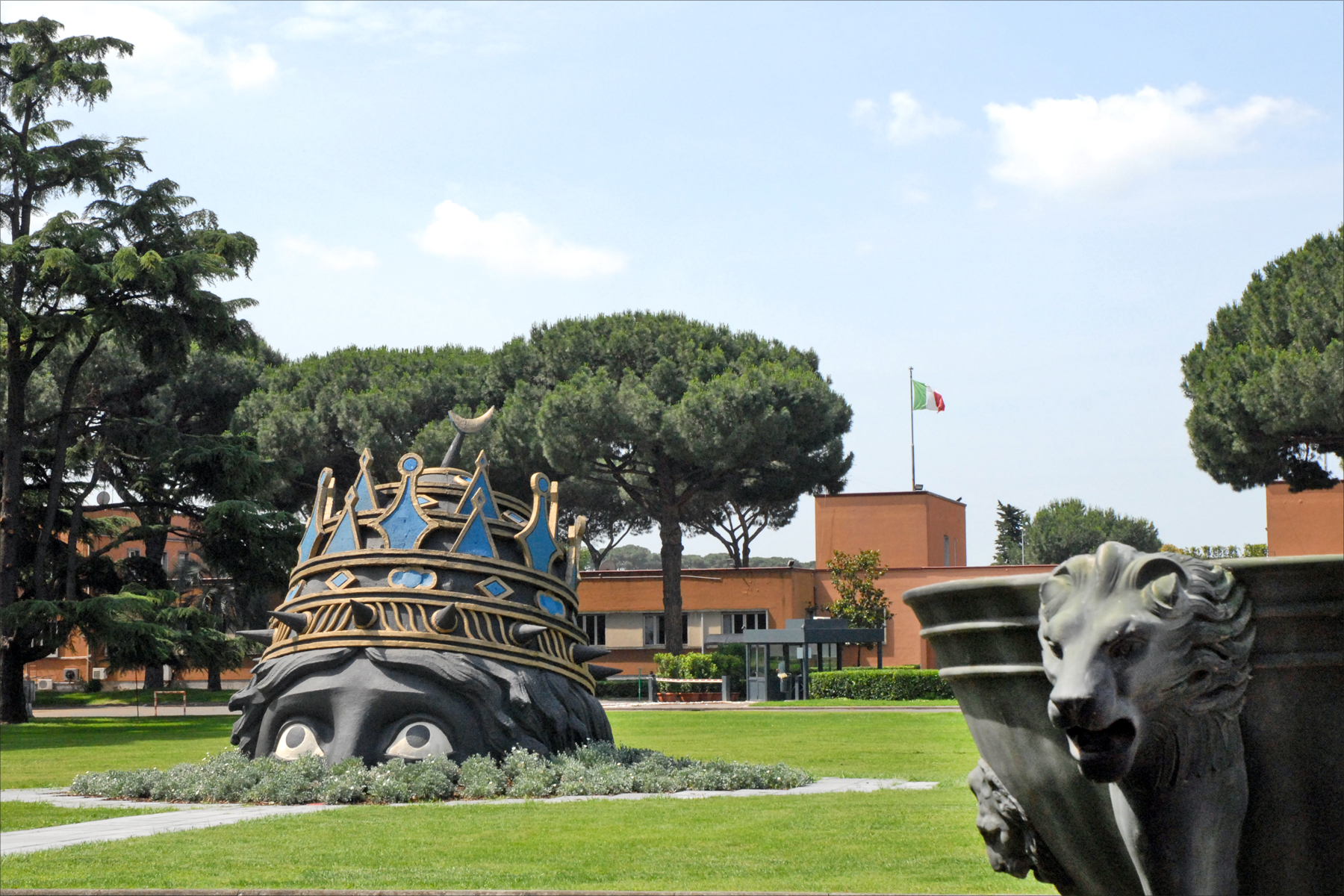
Decorative elements from Fellini's Casanova on the entrance lawn of the studios

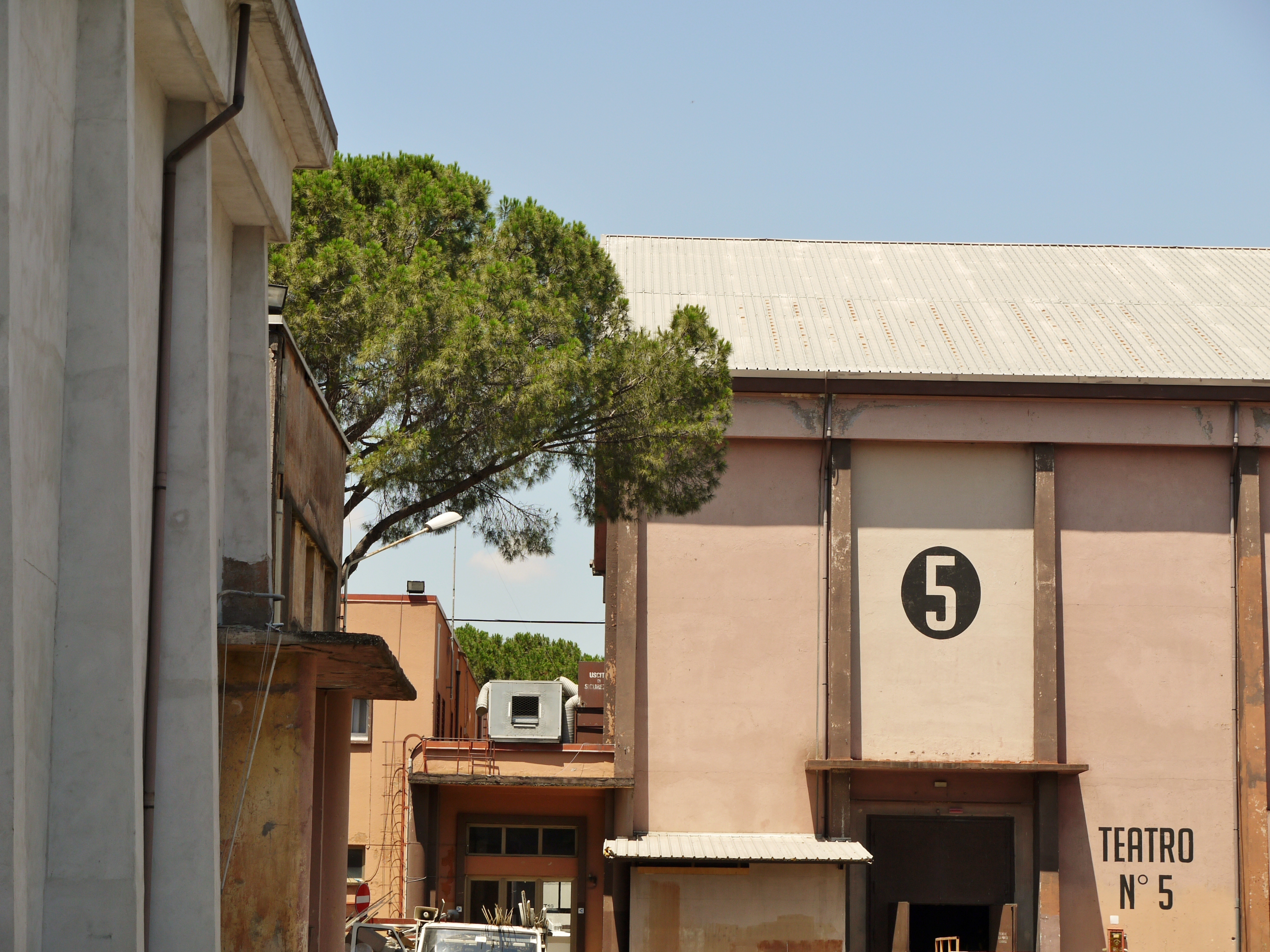
Cinecittà - Teatro 5, Fellini's favorite sound stage

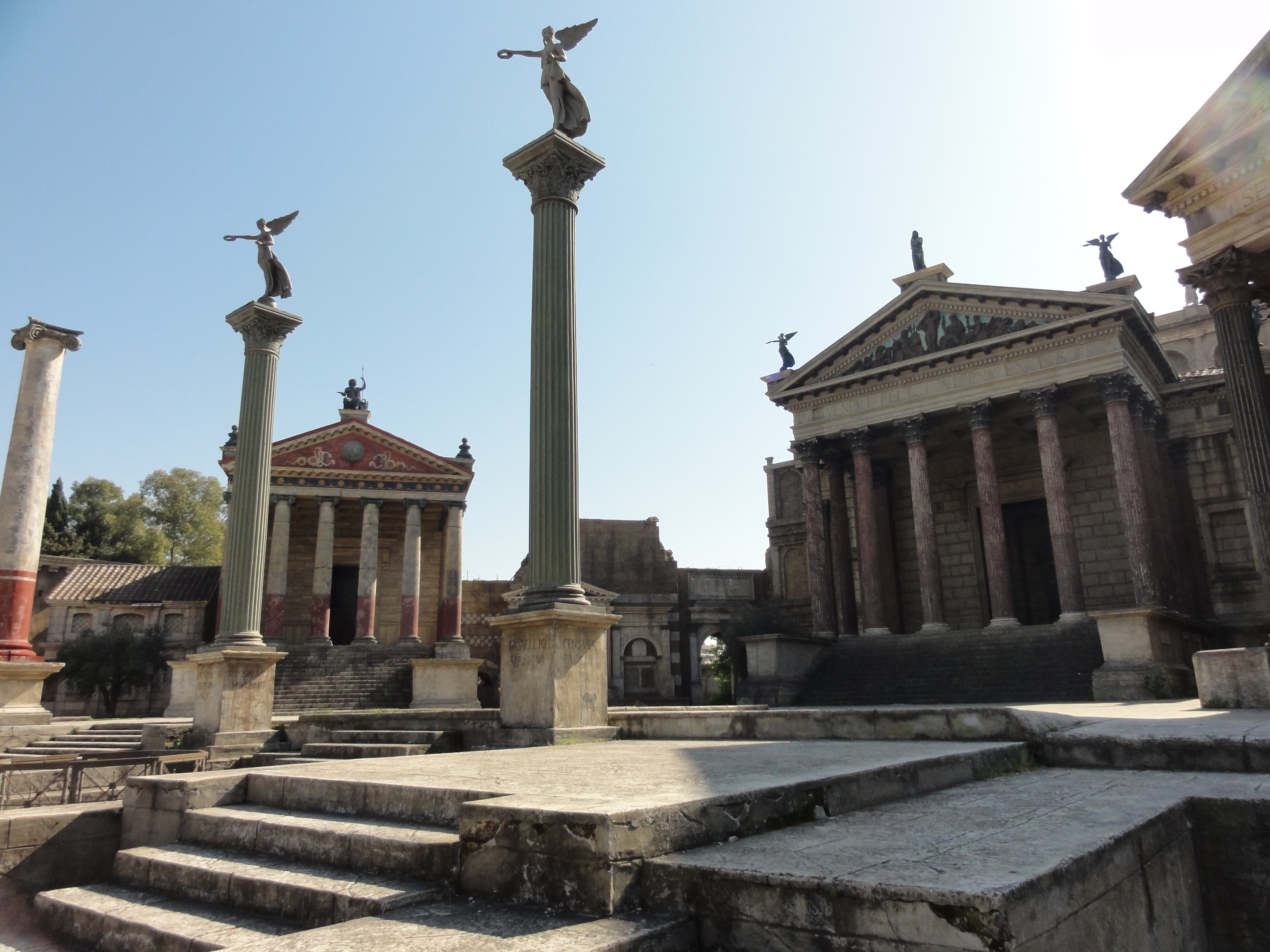
Scenography of the TV series Rome

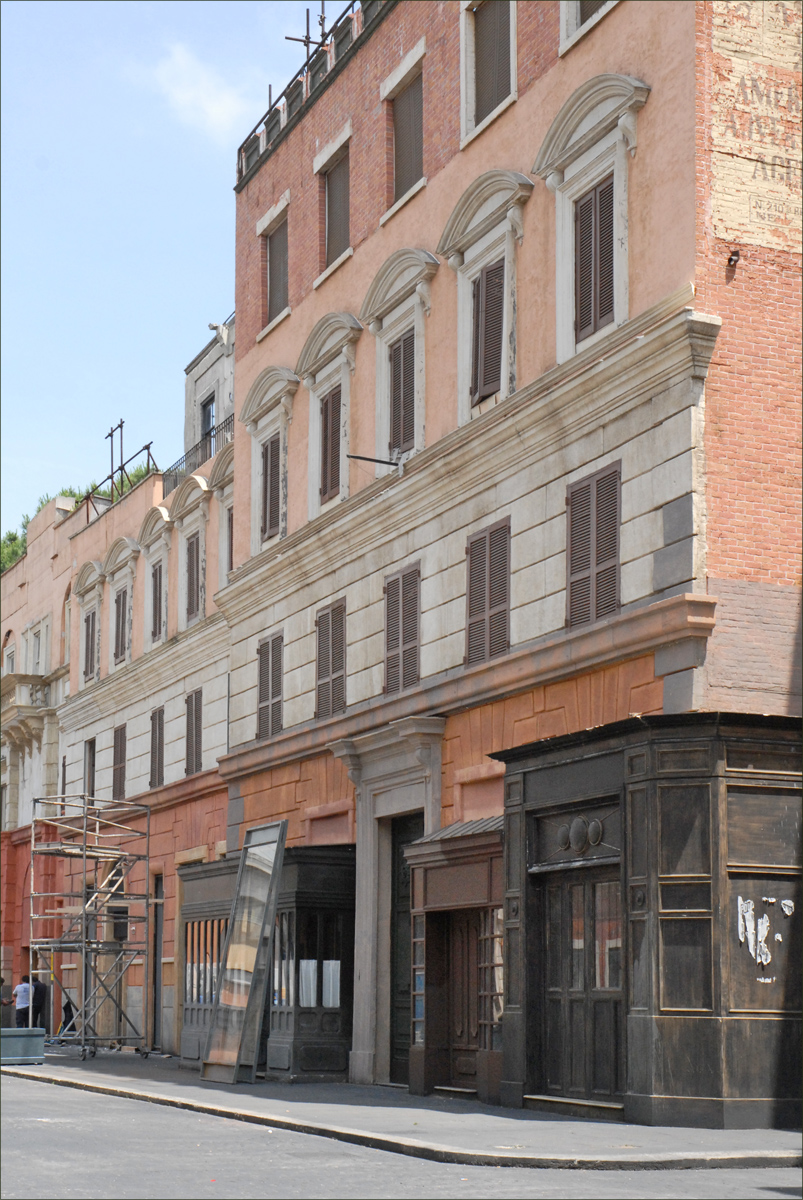
Set of Gangs of New York

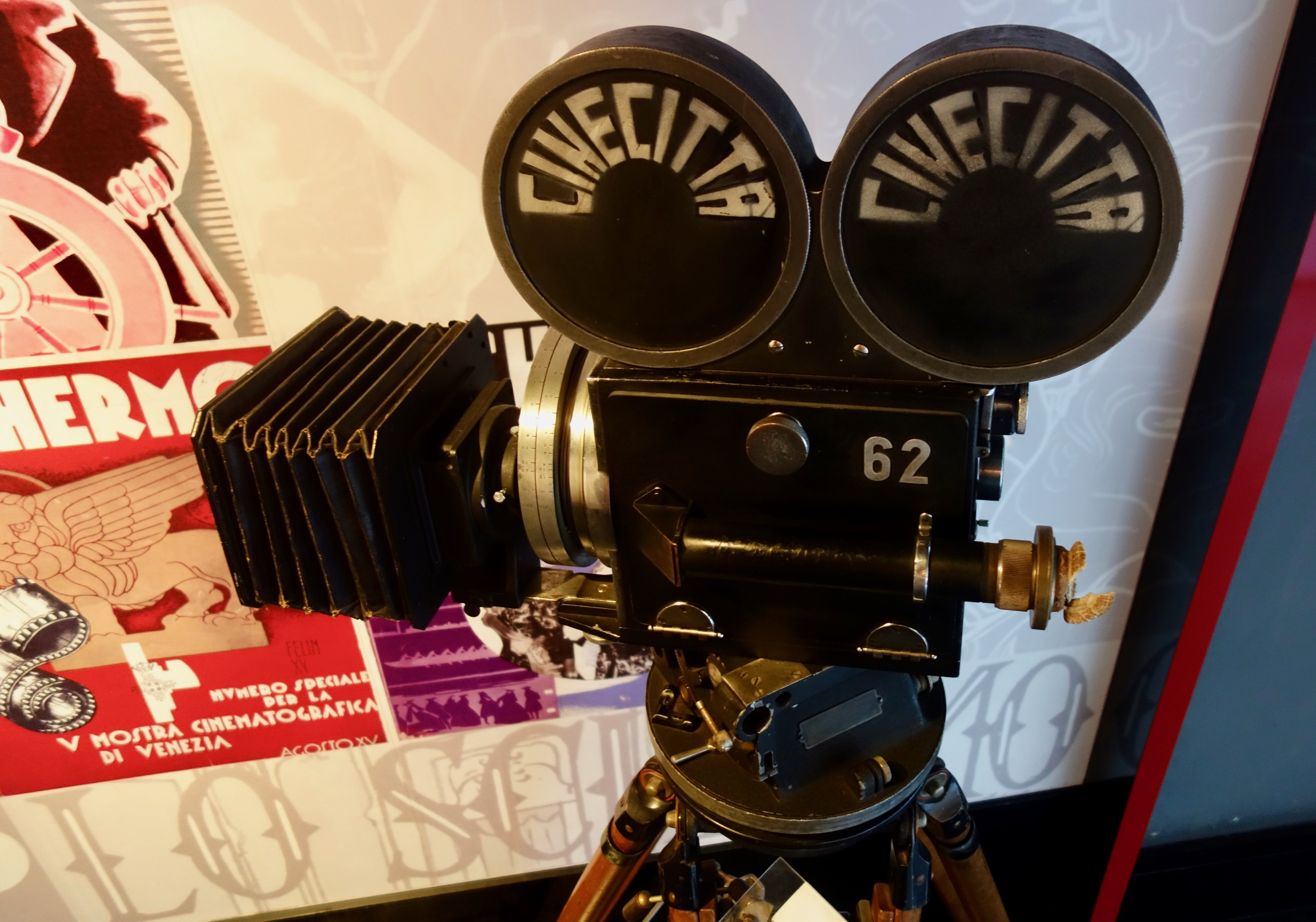
Vintage movie camera in Cinecittà

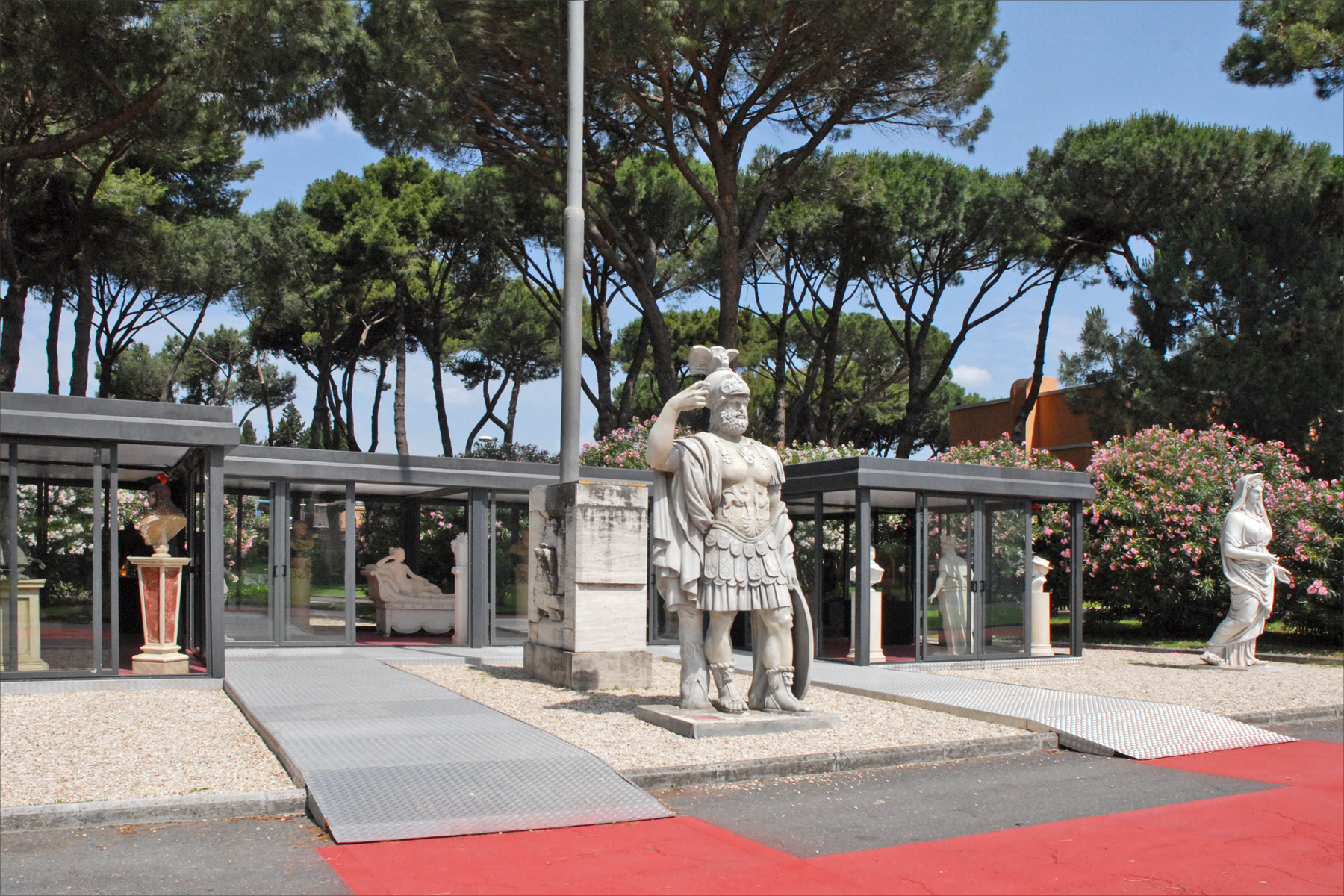
Statues at Cinecittà

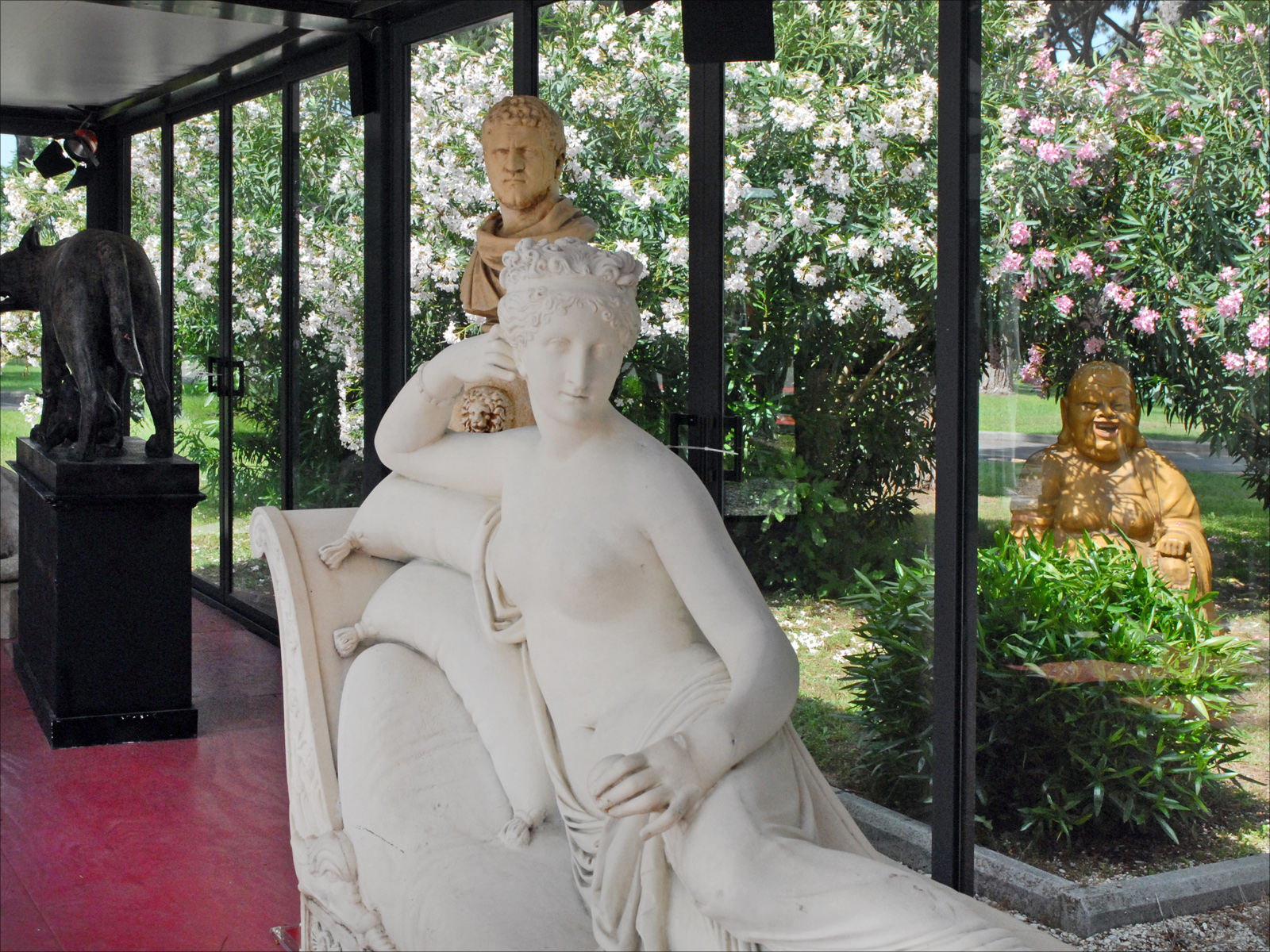
Reconstruction of Antonio Canova's Venus Victrix

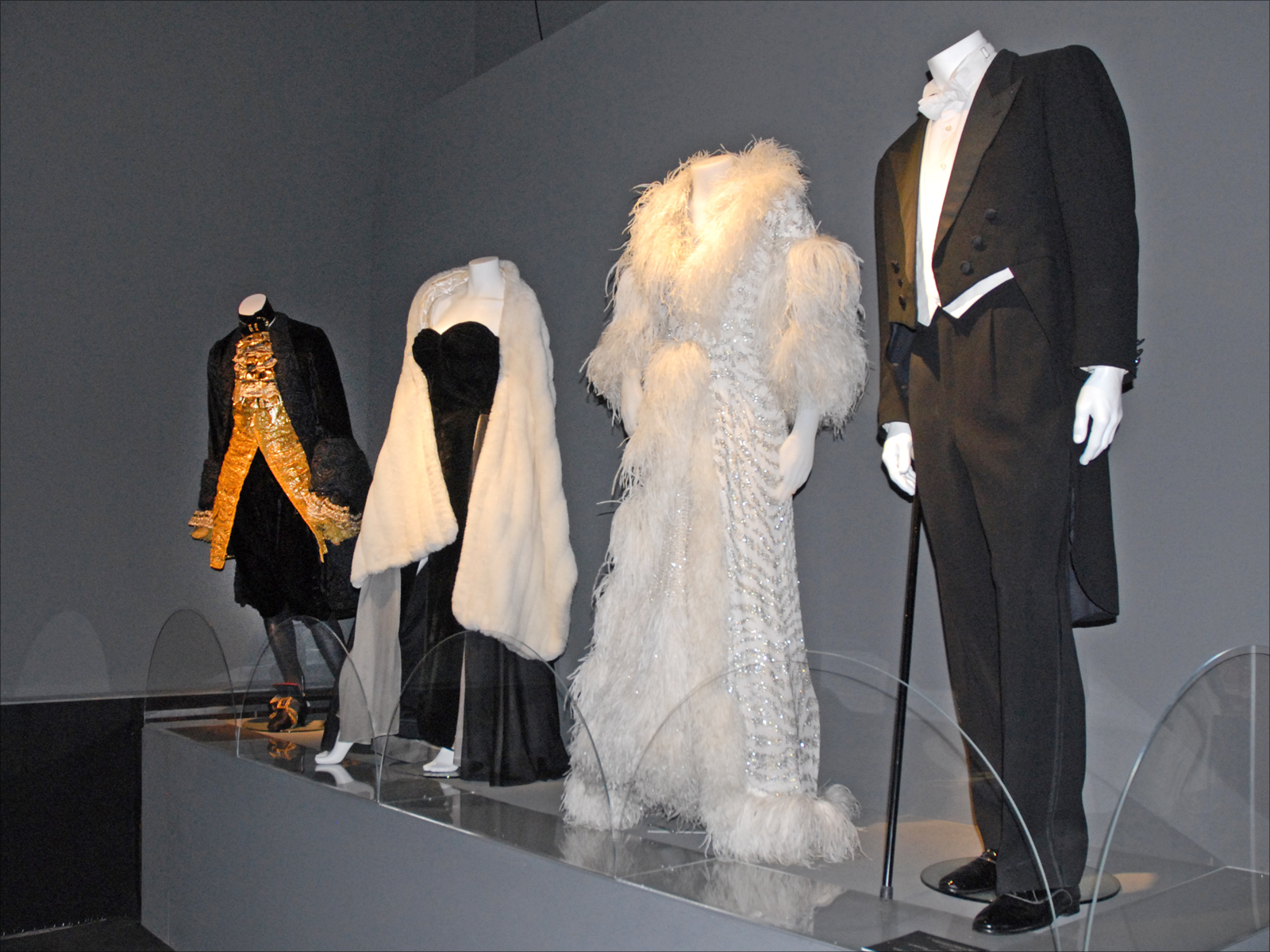
Costumes worn by Giulietta Masina and Marcello Mastroianni in Ginger and Fred

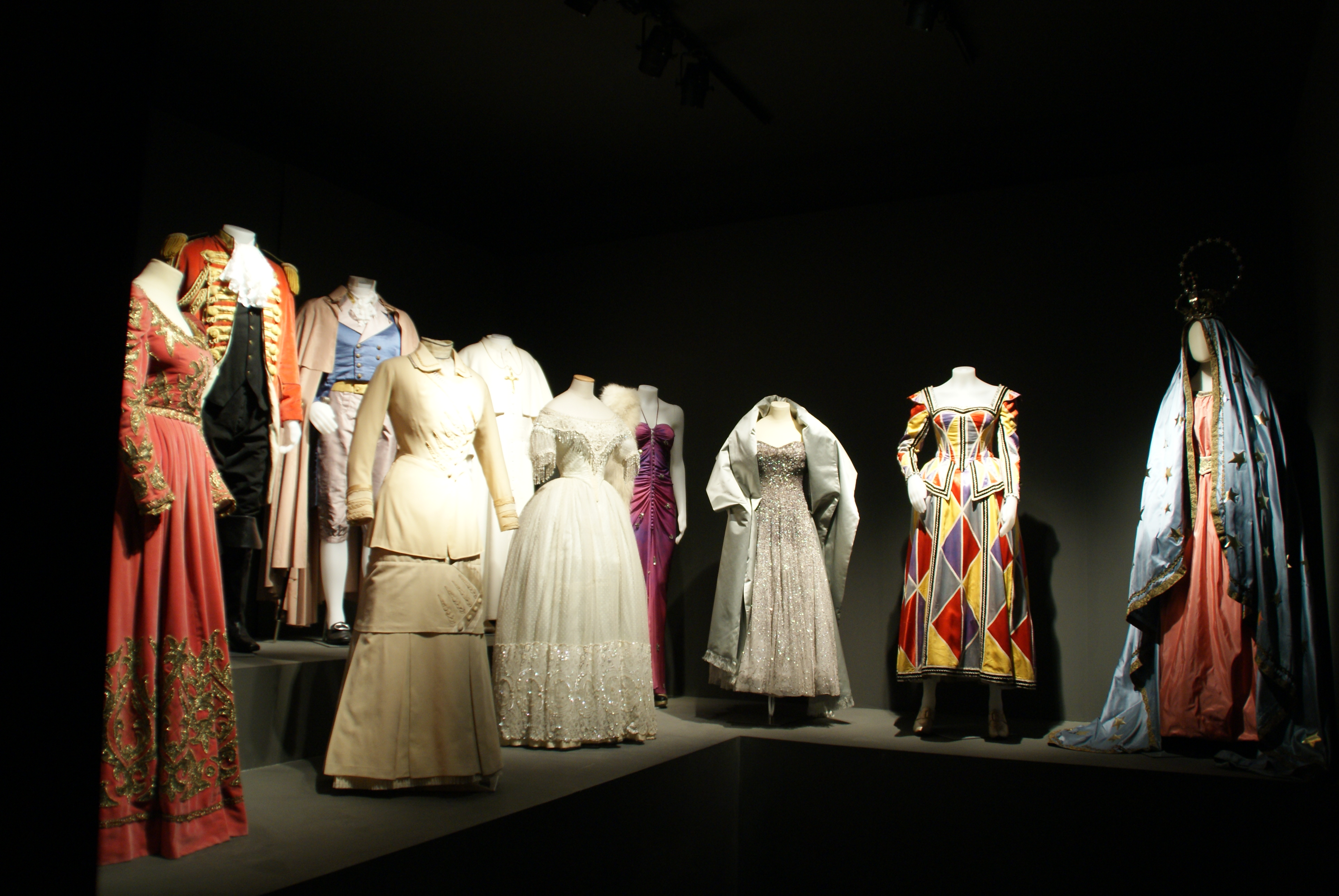
Costumes from The Night Porter by Piero Tosi

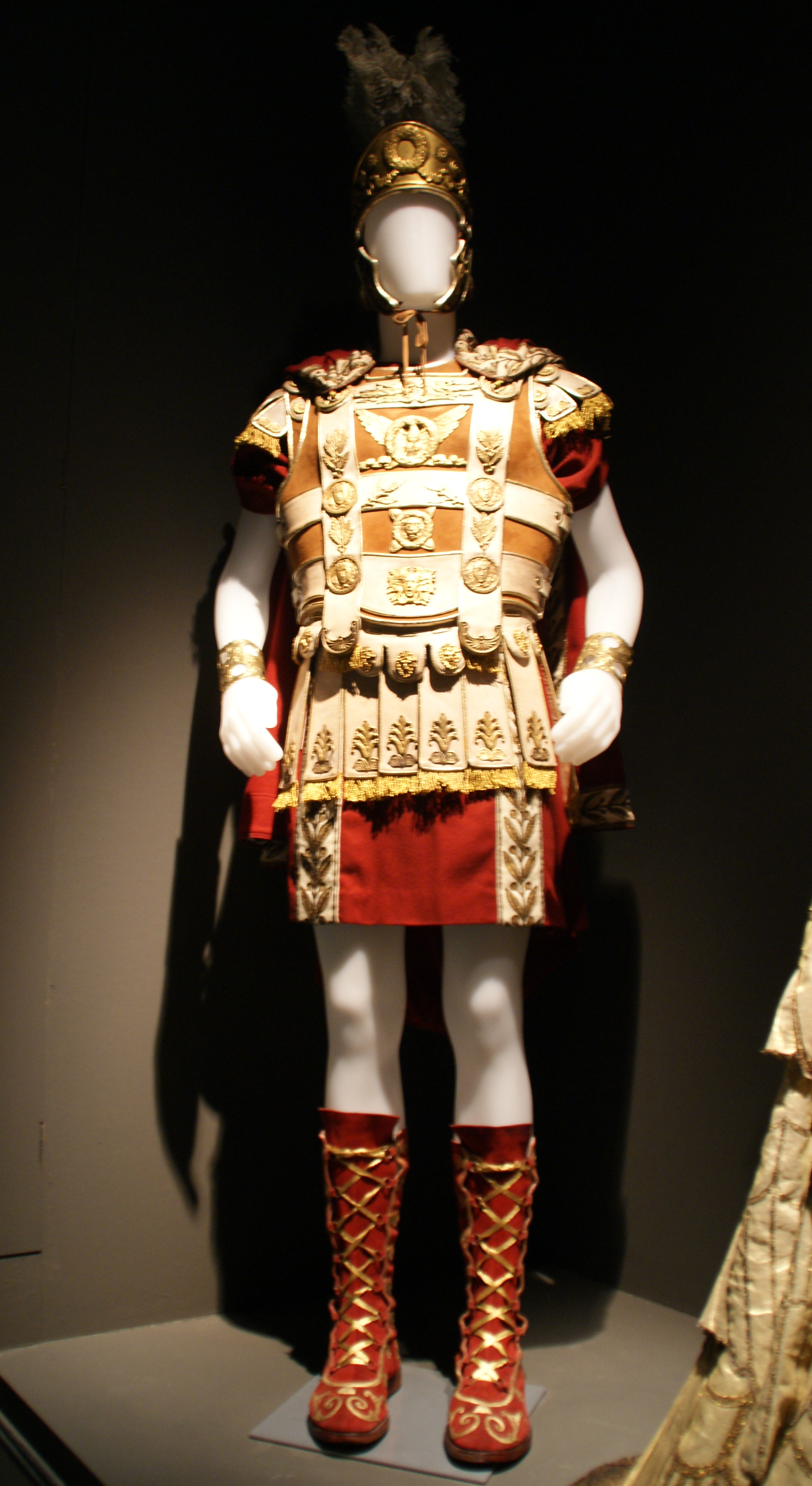
Costume worn by Richard Burton in Cleopatra

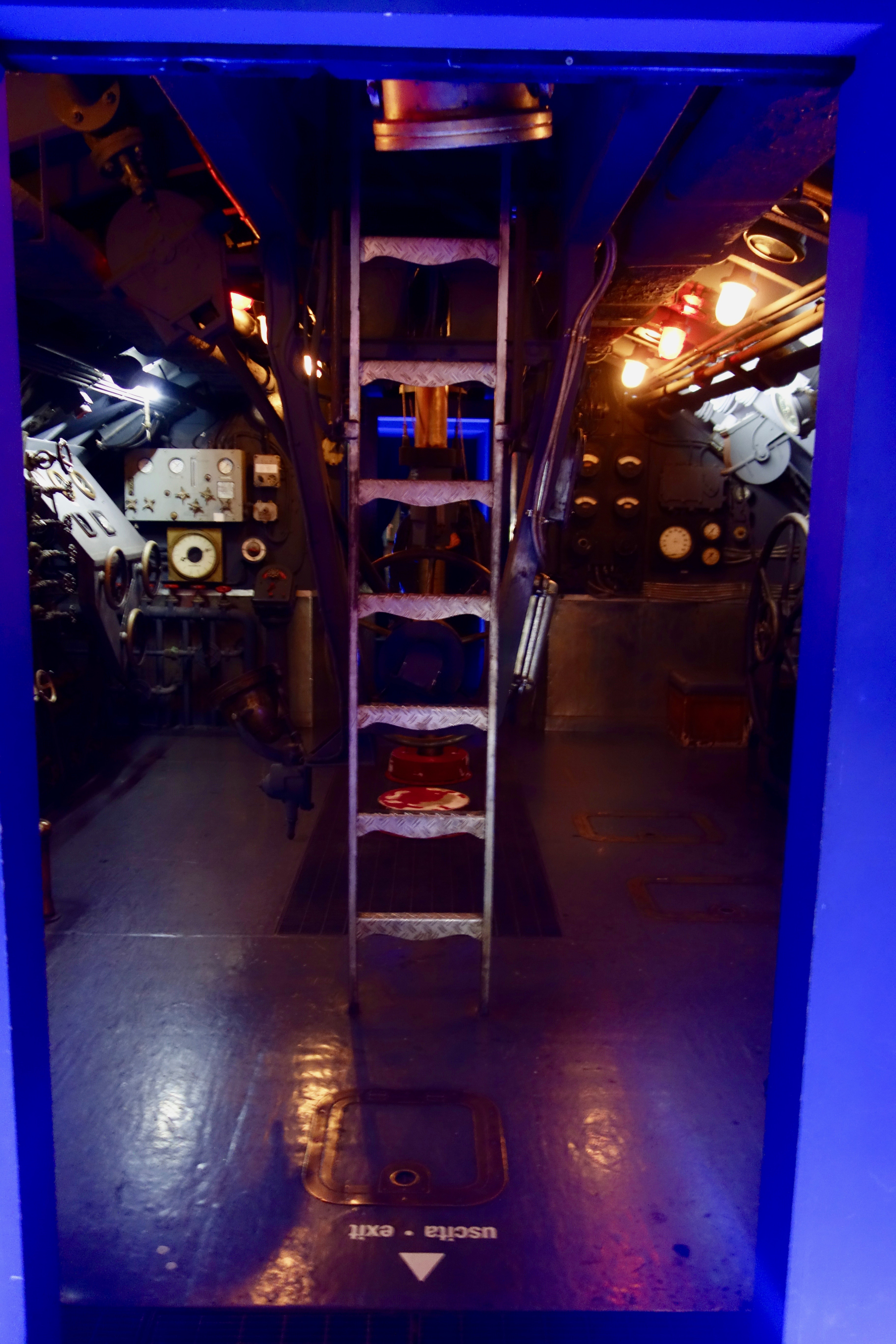
Submarine set of U-571

== See also ==
- Cinecittà metro station

Preceded by Vatroslav Lisinski Concert Hall; Zagreb	Eurovision Song Contest; Venue; 1991	Succeeded by Malmö Isstadion; Malmö
