= Sail a Crooked Ship =

1961 film by Irving Brecher

- theatrical poster
- Directed by: Irving Brecher
- Screenplay by: Ruth Brooks Flippen; Bruce Geller
- Based on: Sail a Crooked Ship (novel) by Nathaniel Benchley
- Produced by: Philip Barry Jr.
- Starring: Robert Wagner; Dolores Hart; Carolyn Jones; Frankie Avalon; Ernie Kovacs; Frank Gorshin
- Cinematography: Joseph Biroc
- Edited by: William A. Lyon
- Music by: George Duning
- Production company: Columbia Pictures
- Distributed by: Columbia Pictures
- Release date: December 1961
- Running time: 88 minutes
- Country: United States
- Language: English
- Box office: $1,150,000 (US/Canada)

Sail a Crooked Ship is a 1961 American black-and-white comedy heist film starring Robert Wagner, Dolores Hart, Carolyn Jones, Frankie Avalon, Ernie Kovacs and Frank Gorshin. It was directed by Irving Brecher and was based on the 1960 novel of the same name by Nathaniel Benchley.

Sail a Crooked Ship was Kovacs' last movie, released shortly before he was killed in a car crash.

Hart's other 1961 film, Francis of Assisi, inspired her to retire from acting two years later and become a Roman Catholic nun.

== Plot ==
When Gilbert Barrows disobeys his boss and tries to refit an old Liberty Ship for cargo use instead of scrapping it, he inadvertently puts it into the hands of a colorful group of crooks led by good-hearted screw-up Bugsy G. Fogelmeyer and brainy sociopath George M. Wilson. The crooks plan to use the ship to make their getaway after they pull a bank robbery in Boston, and they kidnap Barrows and his girlfriend Elinor Harrison – his boss's daughter – to prevent leaving any witnesses behind. With the help of Bugsy's nephew Rodney J. Fogelmeyer, Gilbert and Elinor manage to foil the crooks' plans by using Elinor's bra as a slingshot and attracting the Coast Guard.

== Cast ==
- Robert Wagner as Gilbert Barrows
- Dolores Hart as Elinor Harrison
- Carolyn Jones as Virginia
- Ernie Kovacs as Bugsy G. Foglemeyer alias "The Captain"
- Frankie Avalon as Ensign Rodney J. Foglemeyer
- Frank Gorshin as George M. Wilson
- Jesse White as McDonald
- Harvey Lembeck as Nickels
- Sid Tomack as Sammy
- Guy Raymond as Helmut
- Buck Kartalian as Finster
- Wilton Graff as Simon J. Harrison
- Marjorie Bennett as Mrs. Chowder

== Production ==
The film was based on a novel published in 1960. The New York Times called it "slightly daffy".

Producer Philip Barry thought the novel would make a good film. He pitched it to MGM for whom he had made The Mating Game but that studio passed. Barry went on to sign a three-picture deal at Columbia Studios. In June 1960, Barry said his first film for Columbia would be Sail a Crooked Ship which he described as "Some Like It Hot without drag". He hoped to star Jack Lemmon and hired William Bowers to write the script.

"I can't remember how many opinions were brought to bear on the script," said Barry later. "The ship has changed course quite a few times since I read the book."

In January 1961, Ernie Kovacs was cast. Also that month Columbia announced the lead role would be played by Robert Wagner. He and then-wife Natalie Wood formed their own company, Rona Productions, which signed a three-picture deal with Columbia for Wagner's services. The first film was Sail a Crooked Ship and the second would be The Interns. Wagner would get a percentage of the profits. (In the end, Wagner's marriage to Wood ended in 1961 and he only made the one film for Columbia).

In March, it was announced the female leads would be Joan Collins and Jean Seberg. These roles would end up being played by Carolyn Jones and Dolores Hart.

Following the hijacking of the Portuguese ship Santa Maria the studio briefly considered renaming the film Steal a Crooked Ship to cash in.

Barry wanted further work on the script but Bowers was on another project, so he hired other writers. (Bowers ended up not being credited at all.) Filming started April 1961 without a completed script. Barry said during the shoot, "basically we are in the same position as a play in New Haven with a third act that needs work before it gets to Broadway."

== Reception ==
Filmink argued "the movie would have been better off had Avalon played the lead rather than Wagner – Avalon’s youth and naivety would have suited the story better."

== See also ==
- List of American films of 1961
