= The Inspector (1962 film) =

1962 film by Philip Dunne

- Theatrical release poster
- Directed by: Philip Dunne
- Written by: Nelson Gidding
- Based on: The Inspector 1960 novel by Jan de Hartog
- Produced by: Mark Robson
- Starring: Stephen Boyd; Dolores Hart; Leo McKern
- Cinematography: Arthur Ibbetson
- Edited by: Ernest Walter
- Music by: Malcolm Arnold
- Production company: Red Lion Films
- Distributed by: 20th Century Fox
- Release date: May 24, 1962
- Running time: 112 minutes
- Countries: United Kingdom; United States
- Language: English

The Inspector (also known as Lisa) is a 1962 CinemaScope DeLuxe Color British-American drama film directed by Philip Dunne, starring Stephen Boyd and Dolores Hart. Hart plays Lisa Held, a Dutch-Jewish girl who has survived the horror of Auschwitz concentration camp.

== Plot ==
In 1946 Holland, Lisa Held, a survivor of the Auschwitz concentration camp during World War II, has fallen prey to ex-Nazi Thorens, who has promised to smuggle her into Palestine for payment. In reality, Thorens plans to send her to South America for sex work. Unknown to them both, they are being trailed by Dutch Police Inspectors Peter Jongman and Sergeant Wolters. Jongman carries the guilt of having worked as a policeman under the Nazi occupation and failing to save his Jewish fiancée, Rachel, from death at the hands of the Nazis. Following Thorens and Lisa to London, Jongman confronts Thorens. During their encounter, Jongman strikes Thorens, who falls on an imitation SS dagger he is holding. Concerned for Lisa and believing that Thorens has only been knocked senseless, Jongman leaves, unaware that Thorens is dying. Meanwhile, Lisa has escaped Thorens's flat via a window. Recognizing Jongman as a policeman, Lisa comes to him on the riverbank, asking whether he killed Thorens, which Jongman denies. Lisa knew Thorens was an ex-Nazi but was desperate enough to take a chance that he would keep his word. As Jongman is leaving, he turns to see that Lisa is possibly contemplating jumping in the river, believing herself out of options. He returns and declares that he will help her.

Returning to Amsterdam, Jongman takes Lisa to visit his mother and sister. Jongman's mother initially believes Lisa is using him until Lisa reveals she was in the experimental ward in Auschwitz. Later, Jongman visits Dutch police headquarters and is confronted by his superiors about Thorens's death. Jongman says he struck Thorens but did not kill him; he secretly suspects Lisa killed Thorens.

To make amends for failing to save his Jewish girlfriend, Jongman takes time off to help Lisa reach Palestine. Through contacts, Jongman finds work for them on a barge owned by Captain Brandt. During the journey, Lisa and Jongman start to fall in love and gain the acceptance of the crusty but goodhearted Brandt.

Arriving at Tangiers, Lisa and Jongman contact a Dutch smuggler named Klaus Van der Pink, referred by Captain Brandt, but Van der Pink's price to arrange passage to Palestine is too high. Jongman declares his feelings for Lisa, but she rejects him, insecure of her ability to be a wife or a mother due to the uncertain effects of the medical experimentation on her reproductive organs undergone at Auschwitz. A British agent named Roger Dickens informs Jongman that he is wanted on suspicion of manslaughter for Thorens's death. Jongman then seeks help from American Browne, who agrees to help them initially, but on learning of Lisa's experiences at Auschwitz, urges her instead to testify at the Nuremberg War Trials. Lisa agrees at first, but Jongman encourages Lisa to instead go to Palestine, concerned about her again being exploited as a medical exhibit.

Jongman arranges passage for them in one of Van der Pink's vessels in exchange for agreeing to captain a ship for him for a year without pay. Knowing that the British will try to stop them, Jongman makes a separate deal with the British: if they allow Lisa to enter Palestine, Jongman will surrender himself. Van der Pink, who is smuggling arms into Palestine, tricks Jongman into giving the British his word as a Dutch policeman that Van der Pink's ship is not carrying weapons. Lisa asks Jongman whether he would consider staying in Palestine, but Jongman must keep his word to the British and Van der Pink. When Jongman learns of Van der Pink's deceit in carrying weapons shielded by his word, the captain gives Jongman a letter saying that Van der Pink has torn up the contract committing him to a year's service.

As the ship nears Palestine, it must fend off an attack by gunrunners from North Africa who attempt to steal Van der Pink's cargo. Lisa is shot and wounded by a stray bullet. Jongman reluctantly delivers Lisa into the hands of Jewish forces to fulfill his promise to Lisa, who is reluctant to part with him. Jongman then gives himself up to the British in accordance with his agreement to return to stand trial for the accidental death of Thorens.

== Cast ==
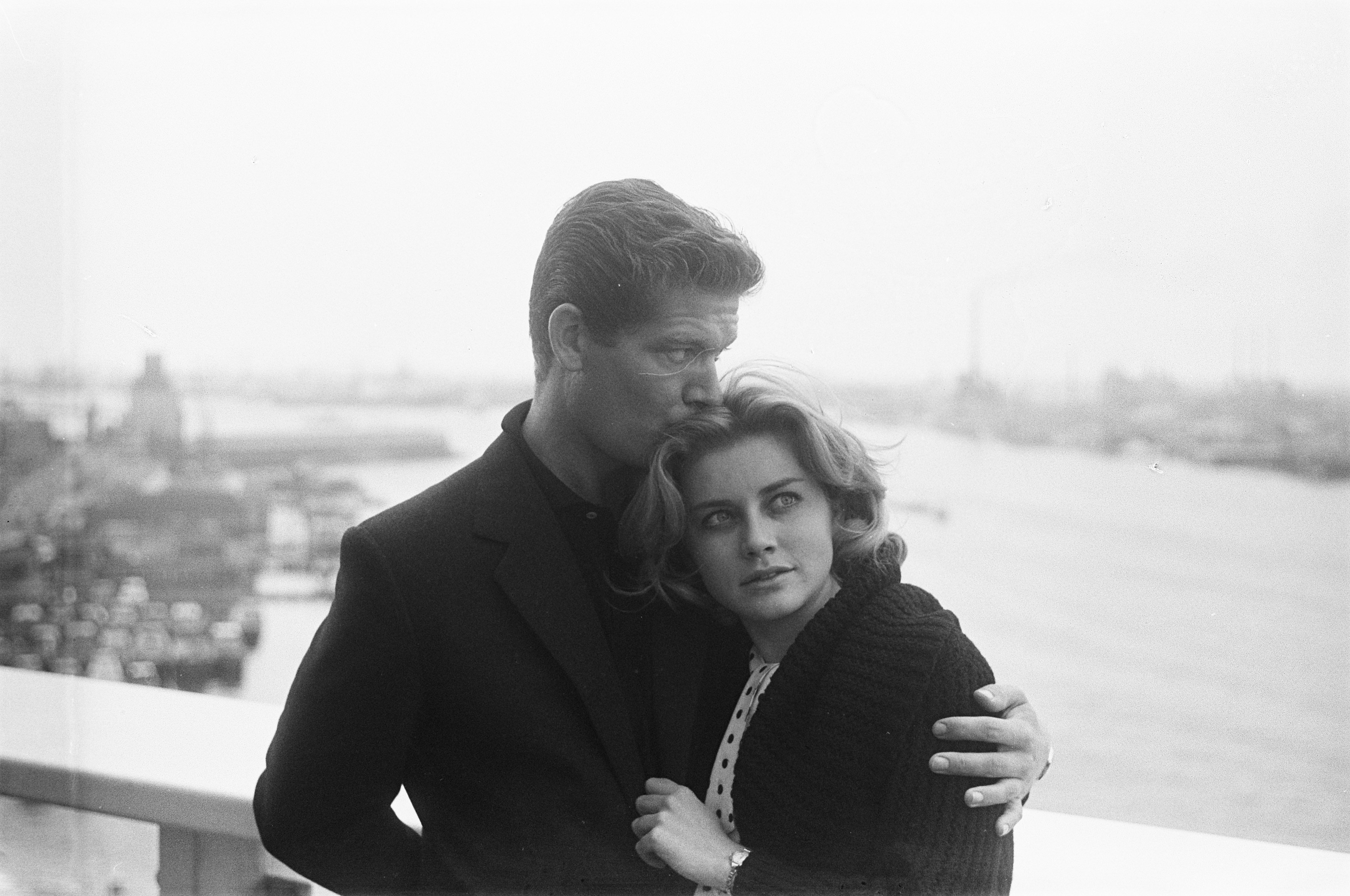
Stephen Boyd (Peter Jongman) and Dolores Hart (Lisa Held) on the set of The Inspector.

- Stephen Boyd as Peter Jongman
- Dolores Hart as Lisa Held
- Leo McKern as Brandt
- Hugh Griffith as Klaus Van der Pink
- Donald Pleasence as Sergeant Wolters
- Harry Andrews as Ayoob
- Robert Stephens as Roger Dickens
- Marius Goring as Thorens
- Finlay Currie as De Kool
- Harold Goldblatt as Dr. Mitropoulos
- Neil McCallum as Browne
- Geoffrey Keen as Commissioner Bartels
- Jean Anderson as Mrs. Jongman
- Michael David as Captain Berger
- Jane Jordan Rogers as Anaka Jongman

== Original novel ==
The film was based on the novel The Inspector by Jan de Hartog, published in 1960. It was the first novel published by the new publishing house, Atheneum Publishing.

The New York Times called it "a sober and touching novel of the human condition." The Chicago Tribune called it "haunting".

== Production ==
=== Development ===
Film rights were bought by 20th Century Fox in October 1960. They assigned Nelson Gidding to do a script and Mark Robson to produce and direct.

In the novel, the male hero was a middle aged man haunted by the death of his Jewish fiancée. The script adaptation made it more of a romance between the man (now younger) and the woman.

In March 1961 Natalie Wood signed to play the lead. She dropped out and Robson cast Stephen Boyd and Dolores Hart – both under long-term contracts to Fox. They had recently acted in "To the Sound of Trumpets" for Playhouse 90.

Robson ultimately decided not to direct and hired Phillip Dunne. Robson said, "Being just a producer, I don't seem to be working. I feel as though I dropped two-thirds of the job. If ever I had any doubts about it, this experience proves that directing a movie is unquestionably more important than producing it."

It was Dunne's 25th year of working at Fox.

=== Shooting ===
Filming started in England in mid 1961. Robson chose not to be present during the shoot. In June 1961 he said, "As to how the picture is to be made, I naturally have to bow to my director's artistic judgement. Until now it has been a community effort. Now I feel shut out of the project. When I last saw the actors I talked to them of the responsibility of actors to directors. For me, it was a terribly sad farewell, a sort of farewell address. It is terribly important for a producer to watch himself to avoid intruding on a director's prerogatives. I am determined I won't do it."

The film was going to be shot on location in Tangier. However, due to political instability there, and insistence of the Moroccan government that the country only be filmed in a certain way, it was decided to film these scenes at Elstree Studios in London. There was location filming in Amsterdam.

The conclusion of this epic was filmed at Three Cliffs Bay on the Gower Peninsula in South Wales, UK. It is suggested that one of the film crew spotted the location during World War II when flying overhead in his aircraft.

In April 1962 the film's title was changed from The Inspector to Lisa for its American release, while it remained as The Inspector for its British release.

== Release ==
Publicist Nat Weiss saw the film and summaried it as "Dolores Hart and Stephen Boyd getting on and off barges in Amsterdam. Philip Dunne, on whom we can always rely, has directed one of Fox's all-time stiffs. Charlie [Einfeld, head of Fox publicity] is readying an all-out sex campaign though and if it doesn't save the picture at least it'll probably get him investigated by some congressional committee."

== Reception ==
Variety called it "sporadically interesting... the final result is curiously unexciting."

Bosley Crowther in The New York Times was critical of the advertising of the film, opening his review with "Don't let those lurid advertisements for 'Lisa' - those agonized blurbs that say such things as 'They experimented on me, sold me like human cargo' and 'Why am I terrified every time a man touches me?' - give you the wrong impression of this film. It is not a shocking sex picture. It is an uncommonly colorful and often tense adventure film." Advertising executives were not happy that he referred to the advertising in his review and noted that the quotes had been toned down since originally conceived. "Crowther destroyed Lisa" wrote publicist Jack Brodsky.

The Los Angeles Times called the film "sluggish, tepid." The Philadelphia Inquirer said the film was an "absorbing drama," aided by overseas locations and the performances. The reviewer said Hart "escapes her ingenue parts of the past" and praised the supporting performers, calling Griffith a "droll delight."

Filmink called the movie "a dull slog, as many movies directed by Philip Dunne tended to be; as Variety pointed out in its review, the film tries to be several things (a romance, thriller, drama, serious comment on human condition), but does none of them well. Even with A-list stars, this movie wouldn't have worked."

== Dolores Hart on Lisa ==
In 1963 Dolores Hart joined the Benedictine Abbey of Regina Laudis and eventually became Mother Dolores Hart. "At the height of her career, Dolores stunned the world by making the decision to become a cloistered nun and enter the Abbey of Regina Laudis."

On May 27, 2014, Mother Dolores Hart was the guest programmer for a broadcast of Lisa (aka The Inspector) on Turner Classic Movies with host Robert Osborne.

Mother Dolores said, "When I read the script, I was 21, I had no idea that things of this nature happened to people. It was a deep experience on the meaning of suffering...She has been in Auschwitz and had been used as a medical experiment. I thought how in the world am I going to identify with this? But then a friend of the director had me see a woman named Suzanne Zada who had actually been in Auschwitz and Suzanne was very open with me to tell me... Lisa was with me at my side for months after we finished the film. Just because of the excitement of getting into a human being's life and story and then being able to present her."

When asked how she felt when she watched the movie, Mother Dolores replied, "I go right back into the character. I remember Stephen and I...he carried me up that the coastline 14 times before we got the cut because of the sun. And I still cry when they put me up on that tank and he goes off and I think, 'Oh, couldn't they have done it a different way!' (laughs) I would love to have married him. But I think that's the actress's prerogative. You can always go back and relive it the way you want. But that film—I live through it. I live through every scene when I see it."
