= A. Lucille Matarese =

American lawyer, politician, and nun (born 1933)

Ann Lucille Matarese (born August 27, 1933) is an American lawyer, politician and Roman Catholic Benedictine nun.

== Biography ==
Born in Hartford, Connecticut, Matarese graduated from the University of Connecticut with a bachelor's degree in government and international relations, in 1955, and with a law degree from the University of Connecticut School of Law, in 1958. Matarese practiced law in Hartford, Connecticut from 1963 to 1971. She also wrote articles for the Connecticut Law Review. From 1967 to 1969, Matarese served in the Connecticut House of Representatives and was a Democrat. In 1971, Matarese entered the Benedictine Abbey of Regina Laudis, in Bethlehem, Connecticut taking the name of Maria Immaculata Matarese. She received the monastic habit in 1973. Matarese served as attorney for her abbey and also served as subprioress of the abbey.
