= Thomas Little =

American set decorator (1886–1985)

- Born: August 27, 1886; Ogden, Utah, U.S.
- Died: March 5, 1985 (aged 98); Santa Monica, California, U.S.
- Occupation: set decorator
- Years active: 1918–1953
- Spouse: Eliza (1915–?)

Thomas Little (August 27, 1886 in Ogden, Utah – March 5, 1985 in Santa Monica, California) was an American set decorator who worked on more than 450 Hollywood movies between 1932 and 1953. He won a total of 6 Oscars for art direction and received 21 nominations in the same category. His credits include The Keys of the Kingdom, The Fan, Belles on Their Toes, What Price Glory?, The Snows of Kilimanjaro, The Pride of St. Louis, and The Day the Earth Stood Still.

== Academy Awards for Art Direction ==
- 1941 (Black-and-White) Richard Day, Nathan H. Juran, Thomas Little - How Green Was My Valley
- 1942 (Black-and-White) Richard Day, Joseph C. Wright, Thomas Little - This Above All
- 1942 (Color) Richard Day, Joseph C. Wright, Thomas Little - My Gal Sal
- 1943 (Black-and-White) James Basevi, William Darling, Thomas Little - The Song of Bernadette
- 1944 (Color) Wiard Ihnen, Thomas Little - Wilson
- 1946 (Black-and-White) William S. Darling, Lyle R. Wheeler, Thomas Little, Frank E. Hughes - Anna and the King of Siam

== See also ==
- Academy Award for Best Production Design
