= Cinecittà World =

Theme park in Rome, Italy

Cinecittà World Resort

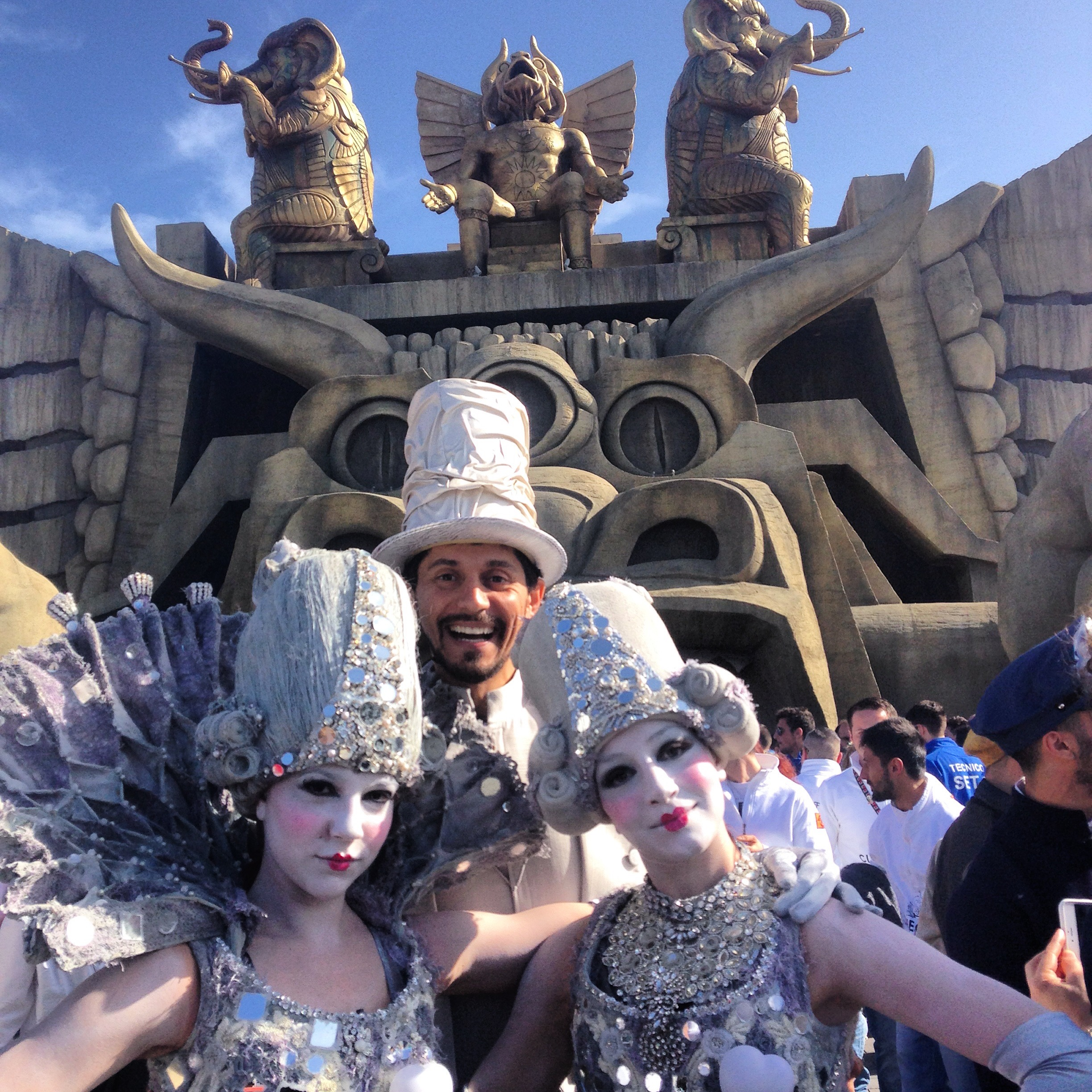
- Interactive map of Cinecittà World Resort
- Location: Rome, Italy
- Coordinates: 41.712739°N 12.449076°E
- Status: Operating
- Opened: July 24, 2014
- Owner: Cinecitta Parks
- Theme: Cinema, Television, Ancient Rome
- Area: 300,000 m^{2} (74 acres)

Attractions
- Total: 40
- Roller coasters: 2
- Water rides: 4
- Website: Official website

Cinecittà World is a theme park located in Rome, Italy. With the creation of the sets by Dante Ferretti it is made up of 40 attractions, 6 shows staged in theaters and outdoors and 7 thematic areas developed on a total area of 300,000 m^{2}. This theme park is famously known for its "Temple of Moloch" entrance, which was replicated from a 1914 silent film, Cabiria.

== History ==
The Park was created on the initiative of the entrepreneurs Luigi Abete, Aurelio De Laurentiis, Diego Della Valle, and, since 2016, Stefano Cigarini.

It includes the water park Aqua World, opened in 2019 as thematic area of Cinecittà World and which will become a separate water park in the future. In 2020, the Roma World experiential park opened, with a hotel-campsite. Cinecittà World stands on the grounds of the old Dinocittà film studios, built in the sixties by Dino De Laurentiis, of which there are studios and some buildings converted to host indoor shows and attractions.

The park officially opened on 24 July 2014.

== The complex ==
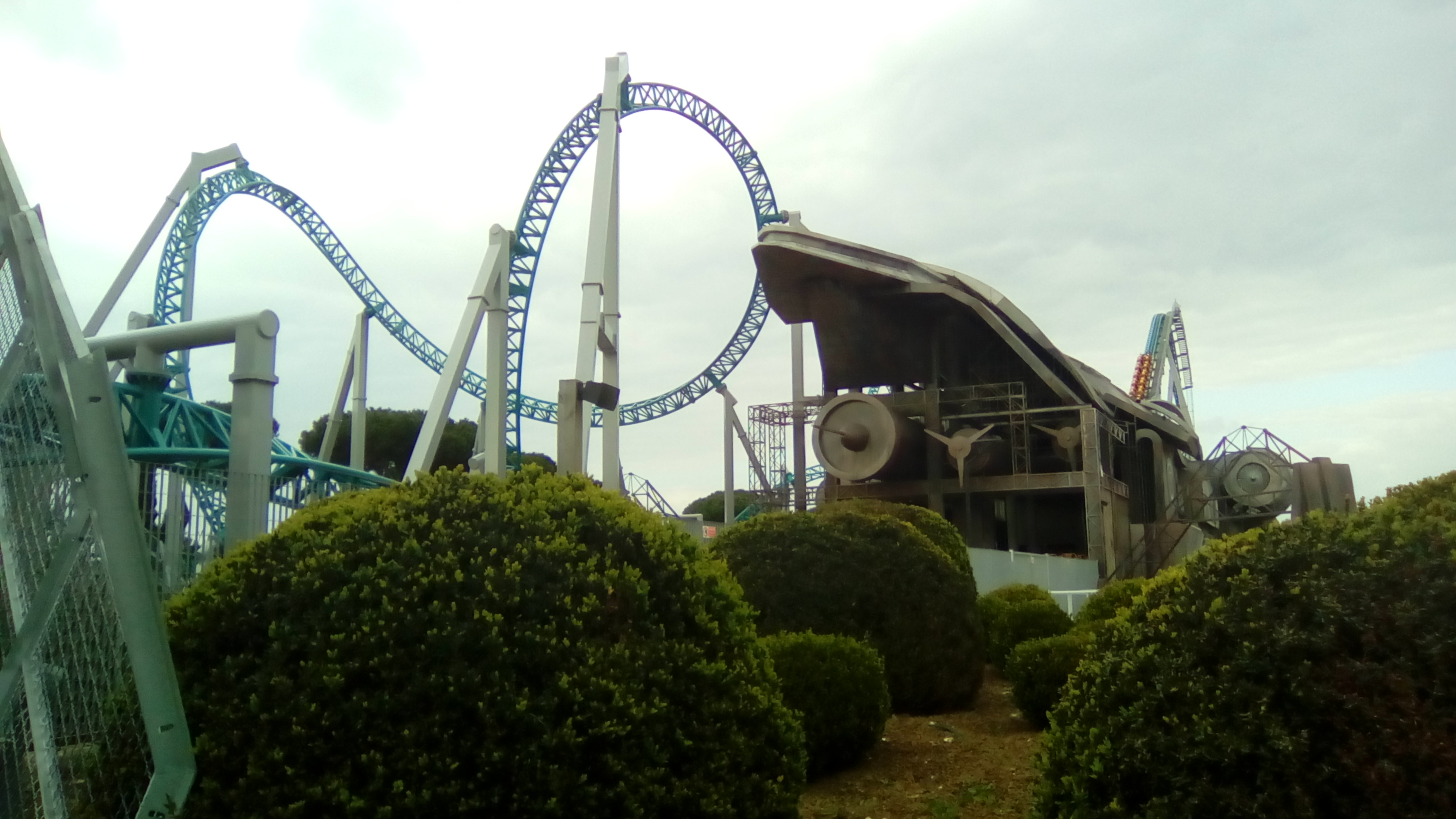
Altair CCW-0204, second most inverted coaster in the world

=== Attractions ===
There are 34 attractions in the park and they are divided into 3 categories: adrenaline, family, children.

Name	Characteristics	Model	Building house	Year	Category	Theme area
Volarium	Flying theater with a futuristic theme where films of Italian cities are projected	Flying Theater	Simtec Systems	2019	Family	Adventureland
Assassin's Creed	Virtual reality maze based on the 'action-game Assassin's Creed	Virtual Arcade	Polymorph	2019	Family	Far West
Horror House	Horror House based on the great horror blockbusters and located in the basement of the Far West area	Horror House(Walktrough)		2017	Adrenaline	Far West
Altair CCW-0204	Futuristic themed Multi Inversion coaster, second most inverted coaster in the world after The Smiler at Alton Towers	Multi Inversion Coaster	Intamin	2014	Adrenaline	Spaceland
Indiana	It is a 60m high free fall tower that develops on the back of a large elephant	Drop Tower	Intamin	2014	Adrenaline	Adventureland
Rodeo	Western-themed Bumper cars.	Bumper Cars		2017	Family	Far West
Aqua Rodeo	Bumper cars on the water. Aquatic version of Rodeo	Water Bumper Cars		2017	Family	Far West
Pezzi da Oscar - Le sculture del cinema	Permanent exhibition that houses over 300 sculptures taken from 30 films, commercials and TV broadcasts	Show		2017	Family	Cinecittà World
La Guerra dei Mondi	Virtual reality attraction set in the set of an apocalyptic film	Living Systems	THESIS	2017	Family	Cinecittà World
Inferno	Indoor family drop coaster inspired by the inferno of Dante Alighieri	Family indoor Drop Coaster	Intamin	2014	Family	Adventureland
Aktium	Roman-themed Supersplash set during the Battle of Actium. The attraction features two descents and reaches speeds of 70 km/h	Super Splash	Mack Rides	2014	Family	Roma
U-571	Walkthrough inside the original set of the film U-571 which reconstructs the interior of a submarine of the WWII	Walk-Through		2014	Family	Adventureland
Jurassic War	Immersive 4D dinosaur themed tunnel preceded by a Walktrough queue.	Immersive Tunnel, Walktrough	Simworx	2018	Family	Adventureland
Le Tazze	Attraction formed by cars similar to large cauldrons that rotate in a whirling movement	Spinning Family Ride	Zamperla	2014	Children	Roma
Torre di Controllo	An up and down tower	Jumpin' Tower	Zamperla	2014	Children	Spaceland
Saltarello	Attraction with rotating mechanical arms and cars bouncing back and forth	Jumper Ride	Zamperla	2014	Children	Roma
Bici Volanti	Attraction with cars that go up or down by activating the pedals	Magic Bikes	Zamperla	2014	Children	Spaceland
Pompieri	Aquatic attraction with a fire truck-shaped car where you can challenge each other with splashes of water	Fire Brigade	Zamperla	2017	Children	Spaceland
Aviator	Flying mini airplanes	Mini Jet Ride	Zamperla	2017	Children	Adventureland
Velocità Luce	Retro/futuristic themed electric car track	Race track	Vari	2014 but renewed in 2018	Children	Spaceland
Giocarena	Large indoor Playground on three floors	Family Playground		2014 as "Il Proiettore Incantato" ,2017 as "Giocarena", but renewed in 2019	Children	Adventureland
Il treno del west	A themed tour aboard small colored vans	Car Convoy	Zamperla	2014 as "Caminiera", but renewed in 2018	Children	Far West
Giochi a Premi	West themed game show	Giochi a premi	Vari	2022	Children	Far West
Missione Laser	Path in the dark in which to cross a laser grid in the shortest possible time. Paid attraction	Skill game	Extraball	2017	Family	Spaceland
Cinetour	Exhibition of sculptures and sets used in various films	Show	Creature studios	2018	Family	Cinecittà World
I-Fly	"Living room" roller coaster in virtual reality	VR Coaster experience	Polymorph	2018	Family	Cinecittà World
Salto Pazzo	Three trampolines of 3.40m, 5m and 6.20m	Trampolines		2022	Family	Roma
Il giardino degli Dei	Walkthrough within a garden with Roman statues	Walktrough		2022	Family	Roma

=== Shows ===
Name	Description	Place	Duration
Welcome Show	Gangster live show welcome	Cinecittà street	15 m
Viva l’Italia	Variety on the beauties of Italy	Theater 1	30 m
Trucchi da Paura- I segreti del cinema Horror	Comedy show about the effects of horror cinema	Theater 4	20 m
Fast and Furious Tribute stunt show	Stunt show	Stunt arena	20 m
Far West Show	Country show	Far West area	15 m
Animazione TRANSFORMERS	Meet and greet with Bumblebee	Jurassic War Plaza	20 m
Animazione Jurassic War	Meet and greet with dinosaur animatronics	Jurassic War Plaza	20 m

=== Themed Areas ===
The park contains 5 themed areas.
Name	Description	Attractions	Restaurants	Shops
Cinecittà World	Main street inspired by 1920s Manhattan	La guerra dei mondi; I-Fly; Cine-Tour; Pezzi da Oscar	Il caffè di Cinecittà World (Cafè); American Bar (BAr); Charleston (Restaurant)	Cinecittà Shop
Spaceland	Sci-fi area around the Altair spaceship CCW 02-04	Altair; Velocità luce; Missione laser; Torre di controllo; Pompieri; Bici volanti	N.D	Altair Shop
Roma	Roman themed area during the Battle of Actium	Aktium; Saltarello; Salto Pazzo; Le Tazze	Roma- Pasta and Fast food (Self service)	Roma Shop
Adventureland	Adventure themed area in a jungle	Indiana; Inferno; Jurassic War; Volarium; U-571; Aviator; Giocarena	Jurassic Bar (Bar)	Jurassic Shop; Inferno Shop
Far West	Western village	Horror house; Assassin's Creed; Rodeo; Aqua Rodeo; Il treno del West; Giochi a premi	Saloon (Steakhouse)	N.D

=== Aquaworld ===
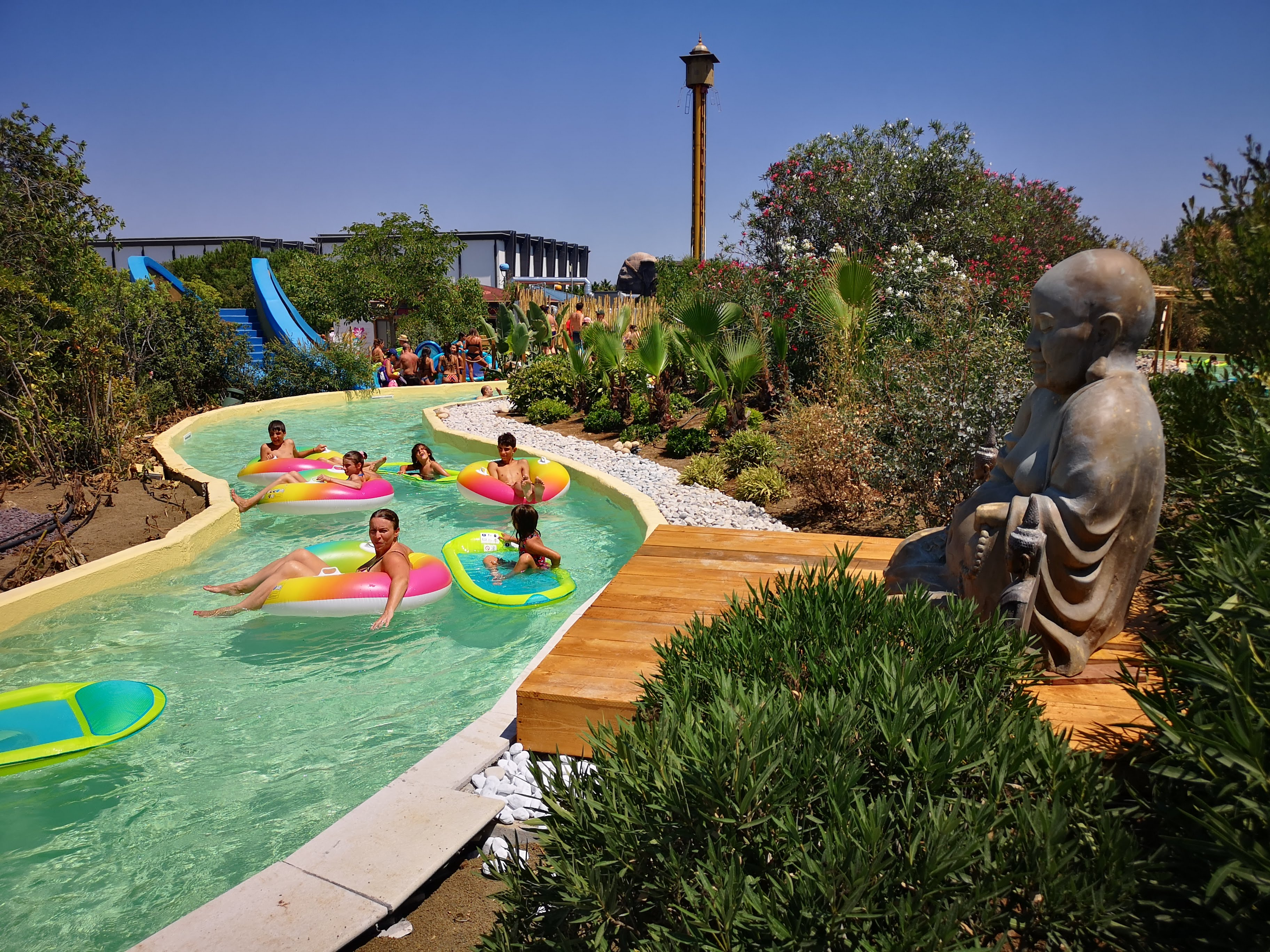
Aqua World - Paradiso

Cinecittà World water park. It opened in 2019 and contains 3 Attractions. It has a restaurant, the Ristobar Aqua World (Kiosk).

Name	Description	Type	Year
Paradiso	Slow river to travel on rafts or on foot, dragged by a gentle current.	Lazy River	2022
Cinema pool	Swimming pool of about 1800 m^{2} with a maximum height of 1.4m equipped with a screen set in the water where films and shows are shown	Swimming pool	2019
Phuket Beach	Beach inside the Paradise River	Beach	2022

=== Roma World ===
Theme park with 16 activities, 4 shows, 1 restaurant and 1 hotel with an ancient Roman theme.

=== Il Regno del Ghiaccio ===
Indoor snow park produced by Industrial Frigo opened in 2018, it is located inside Cinecittà World. Contains 4 attractions and 1 restaurant, Bar Il Regno del Ghiaccio.

Name	Description	Type
Kamikice	Ice slide to do with a sled	Ice laughs
Palle di neve	Playground with snow and snow cannon with which you can challenge each other with snowball shots	Snow Playground
Pattiniamo	Ice skating rink	Ice skating rink
ScivolOne	Multipiste slide on the snow to be done on board special donuts	Ice Racer

=== Restaurant and Hotel ===
Name	Description
Eat like the Ancient Romans	Tavern with ancient foods
Sleep like the Legionnaires	1 bed tents

== Location and transport ==
The resort is located in the Castel Romano district, next to the Castel Romano Designer Outlet (McArthurGlen shopping center).
It can be reached from the SS 148 Pontina.
It’s also served by a shuttle bus service, with departures from Roma Termini and from the EUR Palasport metro station.
