= Vera Duss =

American physician and nun (1910–2005)

Vera Duss (November 21, 1910 — October 2, 2005), better known in her adult work as Benedict Duss, OSB, was an American-born French medical doctor and Roman Catholic nun, founder and head of the Abbey of Regina Laudis in Bethlehem, Connecticut from 1947 until 1995.

== Early life ==
Vera Duss was born in Pittsburgh, Pennsylvania, the daughter of John Duss Jr. and Elizabeth Vignier Duss. Her paternal grandparents, John Duss and Susanna Creese Duss, were members of the Harmony Society, an experimental religious community in western Pennsylvania. She was raised by her mother and maternal grandmother in France. She trained as a surgeon, earning her medical degree from the Sorbonne in 1936.

== Religious life ==
Duss became "Sister Benedict" (Soeur Benoit) when she entered a French Benedictine abbey, Notre Dame de Jouarre, in 1936, the day after finishing her medical training. She worked as a doctor and teacher in Jouarre, and (facing the danger of capture, as an American) went into hiding for part of the town's Nazi occupation during World War II. She was present when the town and abbey were liberated by American troops in 1944.

Duss and Mother Mary Aline Trilles de Warren moved to the United States in 1946, and founded the Regina Laudis monastic community in 1947, near the farm of artists Lauren Ford and Frances W. Delehanty in Bethlehem, Connecticut. The community's founding inspired the movie Come to the Stable (1949), starring Loretta Young and Celeste Holm. Mother Benedict became an abbess in 1975 when the community became an abbey. "The secret to keeping this place going was to do the next thing that had to be done – without wasting time on worrying," she told her biographer. "If you do something concrete, that opens the possibilities."

== Vatican investigation and aftermath ==
Mother Benedict's leadership methods came under question, and a Vatican investigation was ordered. She stepped down as abbess in 1998. Duss spent the last years of her life as abbess emerita at Regina Laudis, where she died in 2005, aged 94 years. Her grave is in the abbey's cemetery. A biography of Mother Benedict Duss was published in 2007.
