= Abbey of Regina Laudis =

Benedictine monastery in Bethlehem, Connecticut

- Interactive map of Abbey of Regina Laudis

Monastery information
- Order: Benedictine
- Established: 1947
- Mother house: Jouarre Abbey
- Diocese: Archdiocese of Hartford

People
- Founders: Mother Benedict Duss, O.S.B. Mother Mary Aline Trilles de Warren, O.S.B.
- Abbess: Mother Lucia Kuppens, O.S.B.
- Prior: Mother Olivia Frances Arnold, O.S.B.

Site
- Location: Bethlehem, Connecticut, United States
- Coordinates: 41.6120°N 73.2103°W
- Website: abbeyofreginalaudis.org

The Benedictine Abbey of Regina Laudis was founded in 1947 by Benedict Duss and Mary Aline Trilles de Warren in Bethlehem, Connecticut. This monastic foundation was one of the first houses of Bendictines in the United States. Mother Benedict and Mother Mary were both nuns of the abbey of Notre Dame de Jouarre in France. Mother Benedict had grown up in Paris and studied medicine at the Sorbonne. Until the monastery of Regina Laudis gained abbatial status, it was a dependent priory of Jouarre Abbey, a monastery northeast of Paris.

== History ==
=== Early history ===
A Protestant industrialist by the name of Robert Leather donated to the nuns land that became the heart of its present property of 400 acres (1.6 km^{2}). Leather was a devout Congregationalist, who cherished a pine-covered hill in town as a place of prayer, and he wanted it held intact and in perpetuity as a sacred place.

A 1949 movie, Come to the Stable, starring Loretta Young, was based on the story of the nuns establishing the abbey in town (a children's hospital in the movie). The movie depicts how the nuns were taken in by Bethlehem artist Lauren Ford.

"Mother ... met with many obstacles, (but) support from the Church came from many, most especially the Papal Nuncio to Paris, the future Pope John XXIII, and Cardinal Montini, who would later become Pope Paul VI", according to the abbey's website. "Through a friendship of many years Pope Paul VI offered inspired wisdom and astute practical advice, suggesting from the beginning that if the new monastery was to attract the dedication of American women, they must be encouraged to have a professional basis for their contemplative life."

=== Later history ===
Since its foundation as a priory in 1947, the monastery has grown to include some 40 nuns. The Monastery of Regina Laudis became an abbey in 1976. On February 10, 1976, Mother Benedict Duss was elected the first abbess of Regina Laudis and became the first nun in America to receive the abbatial benediction.

In the late 1960s the abbey, in conjunction with its Jesuit spiritual adviser, Francis Prokes, formed a number of lay communities. As these communities grew through the 1970s and 1980s, the abbey and Prokes drew the attention of the press for practices and behavior that critics considered manipulative, authoritarian, and "cultlike". The Abbey was featured on ABC's 20/20 and CBS’s West 57th and was investigated by the Vatican in the early 1990s. As a result of the investigation Prokes was forced to leave the Abbey in 1994 and other restrictions were imposed.

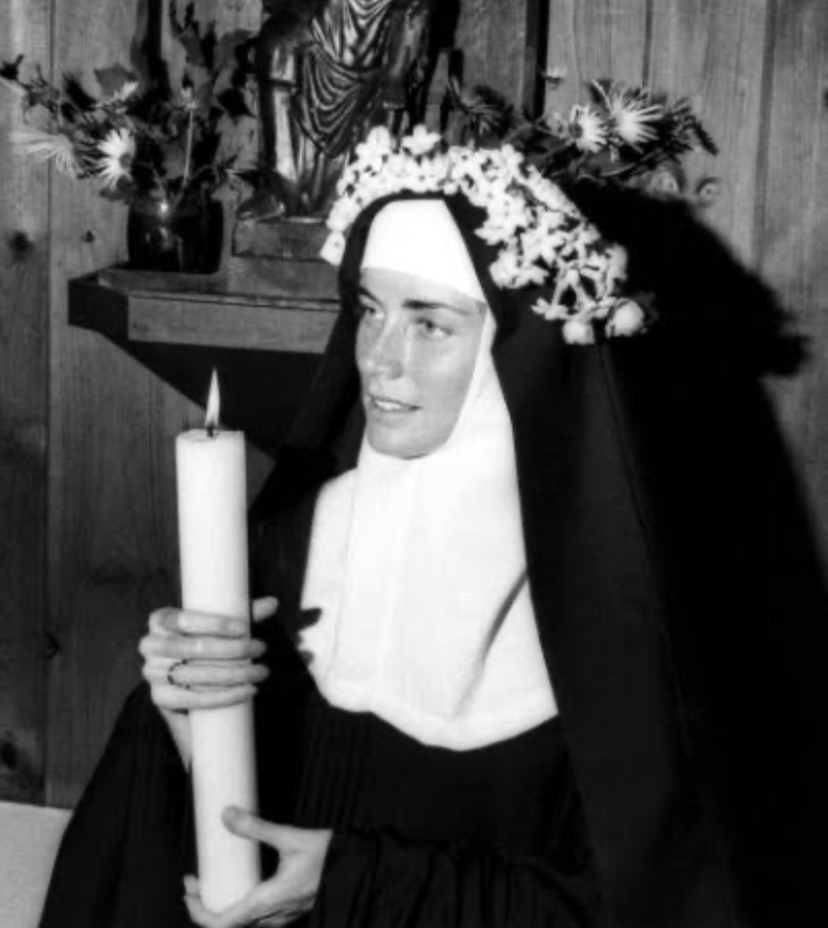
Sister Dolores Hart, a former Hollywood actress, in 1965

On May 13, 2001, David Serna, prioress of the abbey, became the second abbess of Regina Laudis.

On February 1, 2015, Lucia Kuppens was elected the tThird abbess. Kuppens is a student and lover of Shakespeare with a Ph.D. in English from Yale University. She has been coordinator of the Monastic Studies and Monastic Internship Programs of the abbey for almost thirty years. She has always insisted that intellectual life be grounded in the practicals of everyday incarnational life. She has been cellarer of the abbey, responsible for the maintenance of the property and buildings since 2001.

The community is known for its commitment to the arts, including in the performance of Gregorian Chant. Because of the acting background of Dolores Hart, the abbey now sponsors annual summer theatre productions. Hart has worked with fellow artists, including James and Dawn Douglas, to found The Act Association, a group that performs at The Gary-The Olivia Theater, an open-air venue which seats about 200 people. The theater was built in 1982 with the help of actress Patricia Neal. Productions have included plays by Shakespeare, Sartre, opera and musical reviews. Patricia Neal and James Douglas appeared in Love Letters in 1999.

The abbey is also home to Noella Marcellino, an artisanal cheese maker with a doctorate in microbiology, who has specialized in the study of cheese. She was featured in the PBS Documentary The Cheese Nun.

Ssubprioress Maria Immaculata Matarese also lives in the abbey; she is a lawyer and had served in the Connecticut House of Representatives.

Another longtime member of the community, Jerome von Nagel (1908-2006), was a noted poet and translator who had been a German baroness and an artist's wife before joining the abbey.

== Monastic art shop ==
Near the main entrance, the Monastic art shop of the abbey is a store open to the public year-round. Products include crafts and food, such as pottery, candles, woven and knitted goods, wool from the convent's sheep, granola, iron work hand-forged at the abbey blacksmith shop, cheese, honey, vinegar, herbs for seasonings, hot mustard, perfumes, skin creams, cards, books, medals and other religious art objects. The abbey also has CD recordings of its nuns singing Gregorian chant.
