= Joseph C. Wright =

American art director

- Born: August 19, 1892; Chicago, Illinois
- Died: February 24, 1985 (aged 92); Oceanside, California
- Occupation: Art director
- Years active: 1923-1969

Joseph C. Wright was an American art director. He won two Academy Awards and was nominated for ten more in the category Best Art Direction. He worked on 86 films between 1923 and 1969. He was born in Chicago, Illinois and died in Oceanside, California.

== Academy Awards ==
Wright won two Academy Awards for Best Art Direction and was nominated a further ten times:

Wins

- This Above All (1942)
- My Gal Sal (1942) (Note: In 2014, his Oscar statuette for My Gal Sal, was auctioned off for $79,200 by his nephew who had inherited the statue after Wright's death)

Nominated

- Down Argentine Way (1940)
- Lillian Russell (1940)
- Blood and Sand (1941)
- The Gang's All Here (1943)
- Come to the Stable (1949)
- On the Riviera (1951)
- Guys and Dolls (1955)
- The Man with the Golden Arm (1955)
- Flower Drum Song (1961)
- Days of Wine and Roses (1962)
