= Dolores Hart =

American nun and actress (born 1938)

Mother Dolores Hart OSB
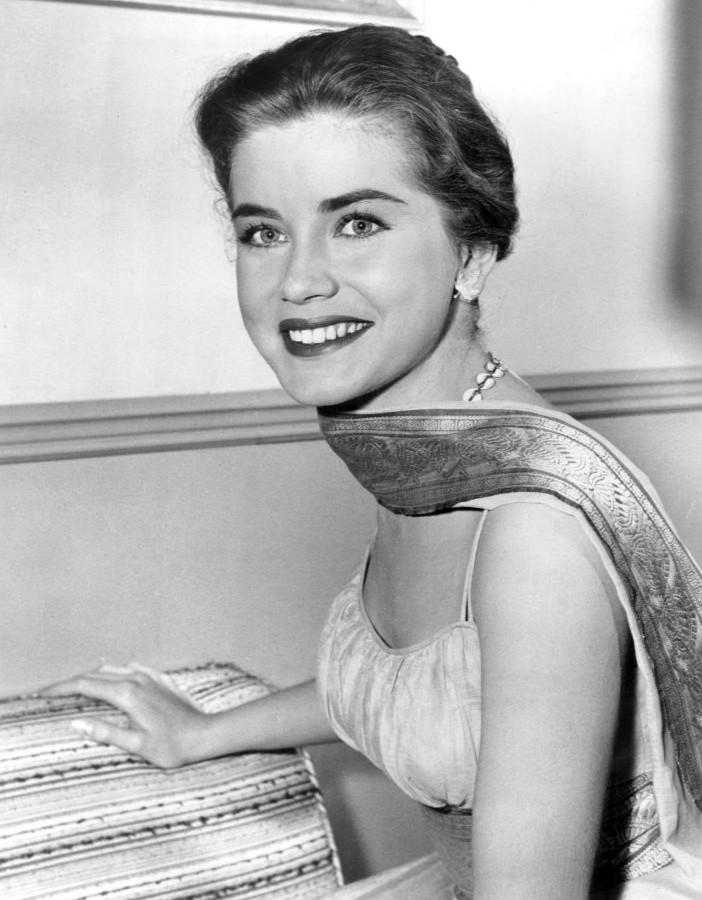
- Hart in 1959
- Born: Dolores Hicks; October 20, 1938 (age 88); Chicago, Illinois, U.S.
- Education: Marymount College
- Years active: 1963–present (religious); 1957–1963 (actress)

Dolores Hart OSB (born Dolores Hicks; October 20, 1938) is an American Catholic Benedictine nun and former actress. Following her movie debut with Elvis Presley in Loving You (1957), she made ten films in five years, including Wild Is the Wind (1957), King Creole (1958), Where the Boys Are (1960), and Francis of Assisi (1961).

At the height of her career, Hart left acting to enter the Abbey of Regina Laudis in Connecticut.

== Early life ==
Hart was born Dolores Hicks in Chicago on October 20, 1938. She was the only child of actor Bert Hicks and Harriett Hicks. Her uncle (through marriage) was tenor and actor Mario Lanza. Hart's father followed movie offers and moved his family from Chicago to Hollywood. Hart decided to become an actress after visiting her father on movie sets, including the film Forever Amber.

After her parents' divorce, Hart lived in Chicago with her grandparents, who sent her to St. Gregory Catholic School. Her grandfather was a movie theater projectionist whose enthusiasm for films influenced her decision to pursue an acting career.

Hart converted to Roman Catholicism when she was 10. By age 11, she was living in Beverly Hills with her mother. She attended the all girls Catholic Corvallis High School. After high school, she studied at Marymount College near Los Angeles where she was spotted by an agent of Hal Wallis in a production of Joan of Lorraine.

== Film career ==
Using the stage name of Dolores Hart in 1956, she was signed to play a supporting role as the love interest of Elvis Presley in the 1957 release Loving You. Hart made two more films before appearing with Presley again in 1958's King Creole. Hart made her debut on Broadway, winning a 1959 Theatre World Award and a Tony Award nomination for Best Featured Actress for her role in The Pleasure of His Company.

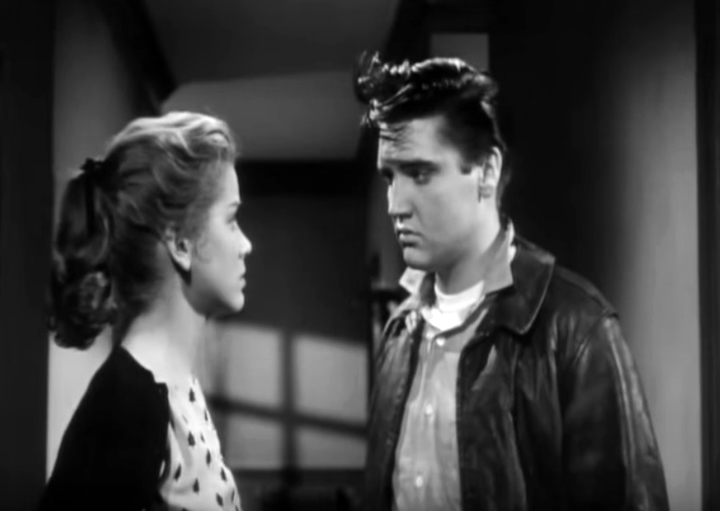
Dolores Hart and Elvis Presley, 1958

In 1960, Hart starred in Where the Boys Are. She starred in the film Francis of Assisi in 1961, in which she played Saint Clare of Assisi. While working on the movie, Hart made a sketch of a St. Francis statue.

Hart starred in the lead role of Lisa in The Inspector, which was based on a novel by Jan de Hartog, and nominated for a Golden Globe for "Best Picture – Drama".

In 1963 Hart appeared as Kathy Maywood on The Virginian in the episode "The Mountain of the Sun". Hart played a Catholic missionary, who against all warnings risks her life to honor both her vows to God and her desire to continue her dead husband's work to help a community of poor and sick embattled Indian tribes. It was her last released acting role (April 17, 1963), a month after Hart's last film role in Come Fly with Me with Hugh O'Brian. At this point she had made up her mind to leave the film industry. The 24-year-old actress became a Roman Catholic nun at the Benedictine Abbey of Regina Laudis in Bethlehem, Connecticut. On a 1963 New York promotional stop for Come Fly with Me, she took a one-way car ride to the abbey (but not in a limousine as reported).

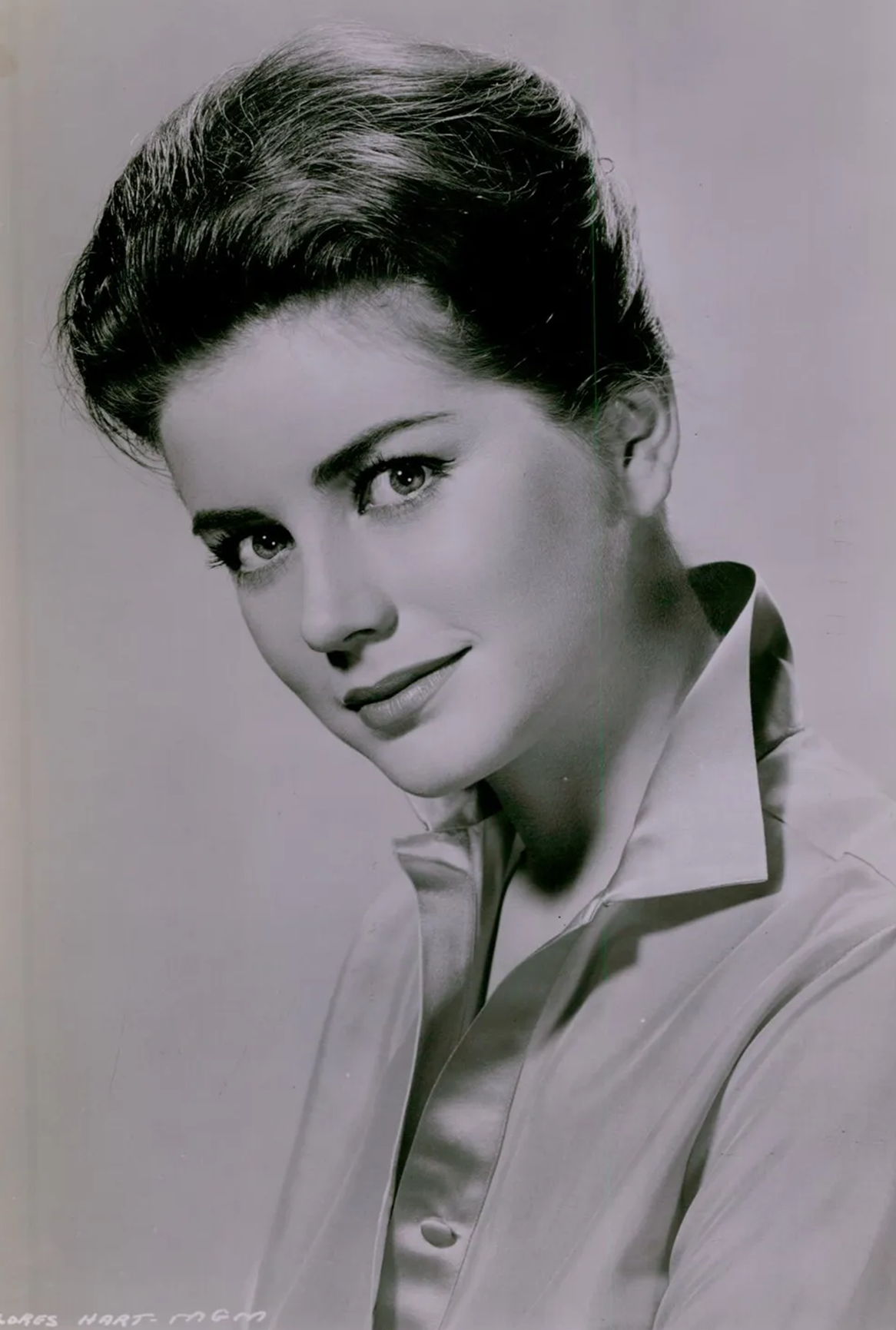
Hart in 1963

During the filming of Come Fly With Me she became close friends with Karl Malden, who also starred in the picture. Malden wrote in his autobiography When Do I Start? that when he and his wife Mona wanted to go out, Dolores would spend time babysitting their kids. She adored the Maldens' children and quickly became like a member of the family. Shortly after the picture, Dolores got engaged, and she asked Malden's daughters Mila and Carla to be her bridesmaids. After they had a couple of fittings of their dresses, Dolores appeared at the Maldens' and announced she was calling off the wedding. A few days later she came over with what amounted to all her worldly possessions, jewelry, purses and knick-knacks, and told the girls to take what they wanted. She said she was moving away and that it was "an affair of the heart" (her exact words quoted by Malden). She not only left behind her fiancé, she left her acting career as well.

Even though she broke off her engagement to Los Angeles architect Don Robinson (April 16, 1933 – November 29, 2011), they remained close friends: she admitted she loved him — "Of course, Don, I love you." But, Robinson said: "Every love doesn't have to wind up at the altar." He never married, and visited her every year, at Christmas and Easter, at the abbey in Connecticut, until his death.

Among the films Hart turned down were Honeymoon Hotel and Bedtime Story. Filmink argued:

We doubt that she would ever become a big star – Hollywood was too geared against women stars in the late 1960s unless you could sing, and all Hart's contemporaries found things harder as the decade went along. However, she was beautiful, warm and could act – she would have had a life-long career. We can see Dolores Hart in a hit sitcom, a string of interesting TV movies and some theatre work, as well as the inevitable guest shots on The Love Boat and Fantasy Island.

== Vocational calling ==
While Hart was making Francis of Assisi in Rome, she met Pope John XXIII, who was instrumental in her vocation.

Hart initially took the religious name Sister Judith, but she changed it to Sister Dolores for her final vows to please her mother. She took her final vows in 1970. She chants in Latin eight times a day.

Hart visited Hollywood again in 2006, after 43 years in the abbey, to raise awareness for idiopathic peripheral neuropathy disorder, a neurological disorder that afflicts her and many Americans. In April 2006, she testified at a Washington congressional hearing on the need for research of the painful and crippling disease amid her ordeal.

Hart was instrumental in developing the Abbey of Regina Laudis's project of expansion of its community connection through the arts. Paul Newman and Patricia Neal helped support the abbey's theater. Hart's vision was the development and expansion of the abbey's open-air theater and arts program for the Bethlehem community. Every summer, the abbey's nuns help the community stage a musical.

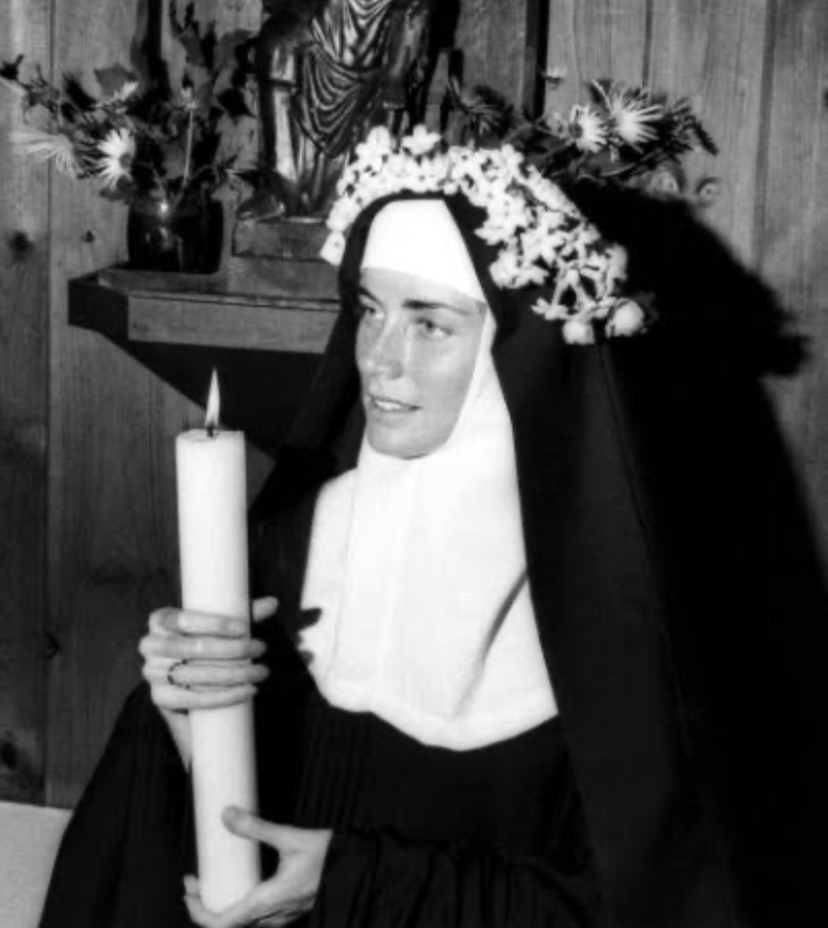
Hart in 1965

Hart was named prioress of the monastery in 2001, after the election of Mother David Serna as second abbess of Regina Laudis, and held that office until 2015.

Hart is a member of the Academy of Motion Picture Arts and Sciences.

On October 4, 2008, the Holy Trinity Apostolate, founded by John Hardon, sponsored a "Breakfast with Mother Dolores Hart" at the Royal Park Hotel in Rochester, Michigan. Hart gave a speech titled, "He Led Me Out into an Open Space; He Saved Me because He Loved Me: The Journey of Mother Dolores Hart to Regina Laudis".

When she joined the Bethlehem abbey in 1963, Hart disciplined herself under the Rule of Saint Benedict.

A documentary film about Hart's life, God is the Bigger Elvis, was a nominee for the 2012 Academy Award for Best Documentary (Short Subject) and was shown on HBO in April 2012. Hart attended the 2012 Academy Awards for the documentary, her first red-carpet Oscar event since 1959.

Hart's autobiography, The Ear of the Heart: An Actress' Journey from Hollywood to Holy Vows (Ignatius Press), co-authored with Richard DeNeut, was released on May 7, 2013.

== Filmography ==
Feature films
Year	Title	Role	Notes
1947	Forever Amber	Child	uncredited
1957	Loving You	Susan Jessup	
1957	Wild Is the Wind	Angie	
1958	Lonelyhearts	Justy Sargent	
1958	King Creole	Nellie	
1960	The Plunderers	Ellie Walters	
1960	Where the Boys Are	Merritt Andrews	
1961	Francis of Assisi	Clare	
1961	Sail a Crooked Ship	Elinor Harrison	
1962	The Inspector A.K.A. Lisa	Lisa Held	
1963	Come Fly with Me	Donna Stuart	
2011	God is the Bigger Elvis	Herself	
2015	Tab Hunter Confidential	Herself	
2017	The Seven Ages of Elvis	Herself	

The seven ages of Elvis is a 90-minute UK feature documentary produced and directed by David Upshal, and broadcast by Sky Arts to mark the 40th anniversary of the death of Elvis Presley.

Television
Year	Series	Episode	Role	Notes
1957	Alfred Hitchcock presents	Season 3 Episode 5: "Silent Witness"	Claudia Powell	directed by Paul Henreid
1958	Matinee Theatre	"Something Stolen, Something Blue"		Co-starring Frances Farmer
1958	Schlitz Playhouse	"Man on a Rack"		Co-starring Tony Curtis
1959	The DuPont Show with June Allyson	"The Crossing"		Co-starring Barry Sullivan
1960	Playhouse 90	"To the Sound of Trumpets"		With Boris Karloff and Stephen Boyd
1963	Insight	"For Better or Worse"	Sandra	
1963	The Virginian	"The Mountain of the Sun"	Cathy Maywood	
