= Francis of Assisi (film) =

1961 film by Michael Curtiz

- Directed by: Michael Curtiz
- Screenplay by: Eugene Vale; James Forsyth; Jack W. Thomas
- Based on: The Joyful Beggar by Louis de Wohl
- Produced by: Plato A. Skouras
- Starring: Bradford Dillman; Dolores Hart; Stuart Whitman
- Cinematography: Piero Portalupi
- Edited by: Louis R. Loeffler
- Music by: Mario Nascimbene
- Production company: Perseus Productions
- Distributed by: Twentieth Century Fox Film Corporation
- Release date: July 12, 1961
- Running time: 105 minutes
- Country: United States
- Language: English
- Budget: $2.015 million or $2.8 million
- Box office: $1.8 million (estimated) (US/Canada)

Francis of Assisi is a 1961 DeLuxe CinemaScope epic film directed by Michael Curtiz, based on the 1958 novel The Joyful Beggar by Louis de Wohl.

The film starred Bradford Dillman, in one of his few sympathetic leading film roles (he usually played a villainous character onscreen), Dolores Hart and Stuart Whitman. Shot entirely in Italy, it earned poor reviews and was a box-office bomb.

== Plot ==
Francis Bernardone (Bradford Dillman) is the son of a wealthy cloth merchant in Assisi. He joins a military expedition, but deserts when an inner voice commands it. He gives up all his worldly goods to dedicate himself to God. Clare (Dolores Hart) is a young aristocratic woman who, according to the film, is so taken with St. Francis that she leaves her family and becomes a nun. This follows a lengthy rivalry between Francis and the warrior Count Paolo for Clare's affections and values; Clare follows a monastic life instead of marrying Paolo, but Francis and Paolo are eventually reconciled.

By this time (1212 A.D.), St. Francis has a well-established reputation for his vows of poverty. The movie goes on to note miracles (such as the appearance of the stigmata on Francis's hands and feet) and other aspects of his life, such as a visit to Sultan Al-Kamil of Egypt, up to and including his death on October 3, 1226. The funeral befitted a man loved by man and beast alike, and ended with the birds he loved doing a "flyby".

== Cast ==
- Bradford Dillman as Francis Bernardone of Assisi
- Dolores Hart as Clare
- Stuart Whitman as Count Paolo of Vandria
- Cecil Kellaway as Cardinal Hugolino
- Eduard Franz as Pietro Bernardone
- Athene Seyler as Aunt Buona
- Finlay Currie as the Pope
- Pedro Armendáriz as the Sultan
- Mervyn Johns as Brother Juniper
- Russell Napier as Brother Elias
- John Welsh as Canon Cattanei
- Harold Goldblatt as Bernard
- Edith Sharpe as Donna Pica
- Jack Lambert as Scefi
- Oliver Johnston as Father Livoni
- Malcolm Keen as Bishop Guido

== Production ==
The film was made by the company of the three sons of 20th Century Fox president Spyros Skouros: Plato, Charles and Spyros Jnr. Plato Skouros produced the film.

Filming started in Italy on 28 October 1960. Curtiz called it "an extraordinarily difficult film to make. We are making a picture about a saint." Filming took five months due to production delays and disorganisation.

Dolores Hart, who played St. Clare, became a Catholic nun at the Benedictine Abbey of Regina Laudis in Bethlehem, Connecticut some two years after the film's release.

== Release ==
When the film premiered, star Bradford Dillman, newly divorced, wanted to bring his girlfriend and later wife Suzy Parker. Fox's head of publicity, Charles Einfeld, refused, saying "Saints come alone."

== Reception ==
=== Critical ===
A. H. Weiler of The New York Times wrote that "as a motion picture dependent on the dramatic conflict and exciting incidents that surely were synonymous with the emergence of such a towering man in such tumultuous times, it is as serene and static as ancient tapestries, limp on castle walls ... There are frictions here, of course, but these are gentle affairs that are not especially memorable."

Variety wrote "The absence of sustained dramatic friction and a reluctance to grapple with conflicts and climaxes in visual terms results in an aura of absolute serenity and a characteristic of ponderous verbosity that may be true in spirit, tone and tempo to the tale of supreme devotion being told, but is unlikely to prove sufficiently palatable to modern audience tastes."

Philip K. Scheuer of the Los Angeles Times stated "The treatment is reverent and apparently unusually faithful to history, the color and CinemaScope production often eye-filling and the performances, while hardly exceptional, will hardly raise dissent. But the picture's appeal is limited decidedly to the devout and to those who would seek serene affirmation of their Christian faith. It is what I call a church film, pure and simple—ecclesiastical and eclectic."

Richard L. Coe of The Washington Post reported that "I kept regretting the firm had three million dollars to lavish on the project. The result may please those willing to settle for a saint's biography. Apart from some individual scenes of pictorial appeal, I found the attempt unimaginative and flat. There is in it none of that sense of wonder which distinguished Pierre Fresnay's memorable Monsieur Vincent, a simple French essay in black and white."

Harrison's Reports gave the film a grade of "Fair" and wrote that "Catholics and those strongly interested in religious themes will be about the only ones deriving much satisfaction from this CinemaScope-Color account of the life of St. Francis. For this superficial treatment is almost devoid of action and suspense, while being too talky."

The Monthly Film Bulletin wrote "With its lepers, its desert rendezvous with a sheik and its deep-seated bitterness between the hero and his irreligious rival, this expensive slab of hagiolatry might well be described as Ben-Hur without the chariot race. As it turns out there is precious little action or dramatic friction of any kind (Piero Portalupi's camera studiously avoids every challenging incident), only a ponderously serene screenplay and a stolidly passionless cast directed without a spark of imagination by Michael Curtiz."

Filmink called it "dull and made by people who don’t understand drama, or had forgotten... the one interesting thing about it is Hart, who later became a nun, playing someone who becomes nun."

=== Box office ===
By the end of 1961 Variety claimed the film earned $920,000 in North America and was on track to earn $1,800,000. Considering its cost this was a disappointment. Variety called it a "box office bust". Plato Skouras blamed this poor performance on the lack of support from the Catholic church and poor reviews.

== See also ==
- List of American films of 1961
