= Lauren Ford =

American painter (1891–1973)

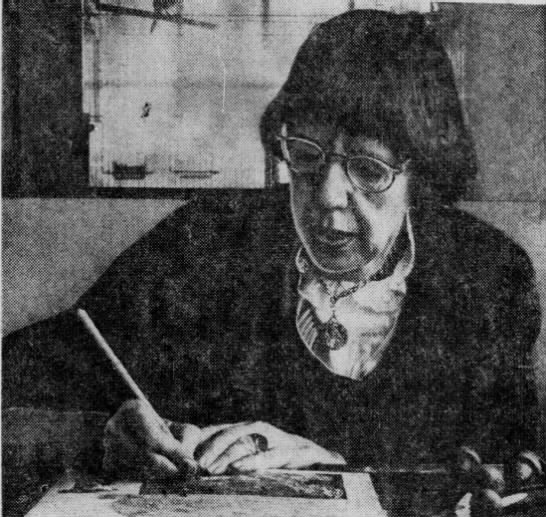
- Born: Julia Lauren Ford; January 23, 1891; New York City, New York
- Died: August 30, 1973 (aged 82); Waterbury, Connecticut
- Notable work: The Country Doctor (1937)
- Awards: Caldecott Medal Honor (1940)

Lauren Ford (23 January 1891 - 30 August 1973) was an American painter and author. Ford's works were held at the Corcoran Gallery of Art and Museum of Modern Art. Outside of painting, her book The Ageless Story was named a Caldecott Medal Honor in 1940.

== Early life and education ==
Ford was born on 23 January 1891 in New York City, New York. She went to school at the Art Students League of New York and Académie Colarossi in Paris, France. When Ford was one and a half years old, she was taught by her mother how to draw.

== Career ==
Ford began her career in painting before writing. In 1928, her artwork was selected to be held at the Ferargil Galleries in New York. In the 1930s, her painting Choir Practice was shown at the Corcoran Gallery of Art in Washington, D.C. In 1937, Ford's painting The Country Doctor placed in second for the Popular Prize at the Annual Exhibition in Pittsburgh, Pennsylvania. Additional museums Ford's paintings were shown at include the Museum of Modern Art and the Art Institute of Chicago. Outside of painting, Ford was a writer and an illustrator. Ford wrote her first book in 1934 titled The Little Book About God with following books including Our Lady's Book in 1962 and Lauren Ford's Christmas Book in 1963. For illustrations, Ford illustrated for multiple authors including Clare Boothe Luce and Winston Churchill. Choir Practice is currently owned by the National Gallery of Art.

== Awards and honors ==
Ford's book The Ageless Story, a 1939 picture book about Mary and the birth and childhood of Jesus, was awarded with a Caldecott Medal Honor in 1940.

== Personal life ==
At the time of her death, Ford had a daughter who she had adopted.

== Death ==
Ford died on 30 August 1973 in Waterbury, Connecticut.
