= List of books and films about Nicaragua =

This is a list of books and films about Nicaragua.

== Books ==
=== Non-fiction ===
- Asleson, Vern P. (2004). Nicaragua: Those Passed By. Galde Press. ISBN 1-931942-16-1.
- Batres García, Eugenio (2006). Impurezas de la Democracia: La Conspiración de la Izquierda Continental. HISPAMER. ISBN 99924-57-80-5.
- Belli, Gioconda (2003). The Country Under My Skin: A Memoir of Love and War. Anchor.
- Belli, Humberto (1985). Breaking Faith: The Sandinista Revolution and Its Impact on Freedom and Christian Faith in Nicaragua. The Puebla Institute. ISBN 0-89107-359-0.
- Bermann, Karl (August 1986). Under the Big Stick: Nicaragua and the United States Since 1848. Compita. ISBN 0896083241.
- Brown, Timothy C. (2001). The Real Contra War: Highlander Peasant Resistance in Nicaragua. University of Oklahoma Press. ISBN 0-8061-3252-3.
- Davis, Peter (1987). Where is Nicaragua?. New York: Simon and Schuster.
- de Belausteguigoitia, Ramón (1981). Con Sandino en Nicaragua: la hora de la paz. Managua, Nicaragua: Editorial Nueva Nicaragua.
- Dunbar Ortiz, Roxanne (1988). The Miskito Indians of Nicaragua (The Minority Rights Group Report, No. 79.). ISBN 0-946690-59-6.
- Dye, David R.; Spence, Jack; Vickers, George (2000). Patchwork democracy: Nicaraguan politics ten years after the fall. Cambridge, Massachusetts: Hemisphere Initiatives.
- Gambone, Michael D. (2001). Capturing the Revolution: The United States, Central America, and Nicaragua, 1961-1972. Praeger Publishers.
- Gutman, Roy (1989). Banana Diplomacy: The Making of American Policy in Nicaragua 1981-1987. Touchstone Books.
- Hendrix, Steven E. (2009). The New Nicaragua: Lessons in Development, Democracy, and Nation-Building for the United States. Praeger.
- Kinzer, Stephen (2007). Blood of Brothers: Life and War in Nicaragua. The Presidents and Fellows of Harvard College. ISBN 978-0-674-02593-6.
- Kruckewitt, Joan (2001). The Death of Ben Linder. Seven Stories Press.
- Lancaster, Roger N. (1994). Life is Hard: Machismo, Danger, and the Intimacy of Power in Nicaragua. University of California Press.
- Rezac Andersen, Sharon (Sep 15, 2012). The Burden of Knowing: A journey, a friendship, and the power of truth in Nicaragua.
- Rushdie, Salman (1987). The Jaguar Smile: a Nicaraguan Journey. Pan Books Ltd. ISBN 0-8050-5311-5.
- Schwartz, Stephen (1992). A Strange Silence: The Emergence of Democracy in Nicaragua. Institute for Contemporary Studies. ISBN 1-55815-071-4.
- Sierakowski, Robert (2019). Sandinistas: A Moral History. University of Notre Dame Press.
- Somoza, Anastasio; Cox, Jack (1980). Nicaragua Betrayed. Western Islands. ISBN 0-88279-235-0.
- Walker, Thomas W. (2003). Nicaragua. Westview Press.
- Walker, Thomas W.; Wade, Christine J. (Jan 4, 2011). Nicaragua: Living in the Shadow of the Eagle.
- Webb, Gary. Dark Alliance: The CIA, the Contras, and the Crack Cocaine Explosion.
- Wilm, Johannes (2011). Nicaragua, back from the dead?: an anthropological view of the Sandinista movement in the early 21st century. Oslo, Norway: New Left Notes.
- Zimmermann, Matilde (2001). Sandinista: Carlos Fonseca and the Nicaraguan Revolution. Duke University Press.

=== Fiction ===
- Ramírez, Sergio (2005). Margarita, How Beautiful the Sea. Santillana USA.
- Serrano, Nina (2016). Nicaragua Way. Estuary Press.
- Sirias, Silvio (2005). Bernardo and the Virgin: A Novel. Northwestern University Press.
- Sirias, Silvio (2009). Meet Me Under the Ceiba. Arte Publico Press.

== Films ==
- Walker A film about William Walker, a 19th-century soldier of fortune and ruler of Nicaragua.
- Under Fire A film about the last days of Somoza's rule. (Fictional story)
- Back from Nicaragua A 1984 film by Julio Emilio Moliné featuring Joan Baez, Pete Seeger, and Holly Near.
- Carla's Song A film about the Sandinistas–Contras conflict. (Fictional, but highly political)
- Nicaragua: A Nation's Right to Survive A 1983 television documentary by John Pilger.
- Nicaragua Was Our Home A documentary about repression of the Miskito Indians.
- Pictures from a Revolution A 1991 documentary in which Susan Meiselas returns to Nicaragua to seek out the people and places she'd photographed there in 1979, during the revolution.
- Que viva Mauricio Demierre/Y también la revolucion A 2006 documentary by Stéphane Goël about a Swiss cooperant who was murdered by the contras during the revolution.
- Last Plane Out 1983 film about the last days of Somoza's rule.
- The Mosquito Coast by Peter Weir
- Sandino (1990) by Miguel Littín
- Kill the Messenger (2014 film) by Michael Cuesta
- From the Ashes: Nicaragua Today by Helena Solberg

== See also ==
- Bibliography of Nicaragua
- List of Nicaraguan films
