= History of the Jews in Nicaragua =

Jewish Nicaraguan Judío Nicaragüense
Total population
- ~50 families

Regions with significant populations
- Managua, San Juan del Sur

Languages
- Spanish and Hebrew

Religion
- Judaism

The history of the Jews in Nicaragua dates back to the 1400s. Jewish Nicaraguans or Nicaraguan Jews (Spanish: Judío Nicaragüense) are Nicaraguans of Jewish ancestry who were born in or have immigrated to Nicaragua. They are part of the ethnic Jewish diaspora.

== History ==
It is likely that Jews first arrived in Nicaragua during the Spanish colonization of the Americas, as part of a wave of Conversos fleeing the Spanish Inquisition. Besides Conversos, one of the first Jewish families to immigrate to Nicaragua were the Oppenheimers, who were originally from France. Nestor Oppenheimer was married to Camila (Camille) Winston Lazard, and they registered the birth of a son, Rene Salomon Oppenheimer, on July 22, 1911 in the capital city of Managua. Other families included Dreyfus, Levy, Raskosky, and Salomon. Another notable family who appears to be of Sephardi Jew descent is the Rios-Montiel and Morales family of Juigalpa. More Jews immigrated to Nicaragua from Eastern Europe after 1929, and they formed the bulk of country's Jewish community during the 20th century. While the majority of these immigrants came to Nicaragua in pursuit of economic opportunities, many of them were either refugees from or survivors of The Holocaust.

=== Somoza Period ===
The majority of Nicaraguan Jews lived in Managua, and made significant contributions to Nicaragua's economic development while dedicating themselves to farming, manufacturing, textiles, and retail. Among the many Nicaraguan-Jewish families that ran successful businesses were the Salomon and Dreyfus families, which both operated well-known department stores in Managua during the first half of the 20th century, and the Gorn family, which both operated and still runs Radio Centro, the biggest electronics store in Nicaragua.

Given the small size of the community, many of the Jewish immigrants went on to marry non-Jews, giving rise to Nicaraguan families of partial Jewish ancestry. Despite this, many if not most Nicaraguan Jews were still committed to maintaining Jewish life. The Congregacion Israelita de Nicaragua was the central Jewish organization until 1979. The community maintained a synagogue and social center in Managua, as well as a B'nai B'rith lodge and a Women's International Zionist Organization (WIZO) chapter.

It has been estimated that the number of Jews in Nicaragua reached a peak of 250 in 1972. However, that same year a devastating earthquake hit Managua and destroyed 90% of the city, prompting many Nicaraguans to emigrate. In 1975 there were 200 Jews in Nicaragua.

In 1978, during street warfare between Somozistas and Sandinistas, a Molotov cocktail was thrown at the Managua synagogue, igniting its wooden doors. When the worshipers emerged from the building they were confronted by a carload of armed men who they recognized as Sandinistas. Mauricio Palacio, a former leftist rebel who became a refugee in the United States after having grown disillusioned with the Sandinistas, gave a signed statement confessing to his part in the 1978 arson attack against the Managua synagogue.

=== Sandinista Period ===
During and after the warfare and civil unrest of the 1978-1979 Sandinista Revolution, which culminated in the overthrow of Anastasio Somoza Debayle, thousands of wealthy and middle-class Nicaraguans fled the country, concerned about their future under the incoming socialist regime. The Sandinistas later passed a law empowering the government to seize the property of those who left.

The Sandinistas were perceived as being hostile to the country's Jewish community. This hostility was attributed to a number of factors, including the economic status of Nicaraguan Jews, the opposition of many members of the community to the Sandinista's political platform, the support of some members of the community for the Somoza family, the Sandinista's relationship with the Palestine Liberation Organization, and misdirected blame for Israel's arms sales to the Somoza regime. By the time Somoza fell, the Jewish population had already declined to around 50 individuals. The synagogue in Managua was later seized by the Sandinistas and converted into a government youth center, which was described as being an elite social club for the children of high ranking Sandinista officials. As more Jews fled the country, additional properties of Jewish emigrants were seized in accordance with the relevant law.

=== Media Controversy ===
Beginning in 1983, the Reagan administration, which was trying to increase domestic support for the Contras, made an effort to persuade the American people that not only were the Sandinistas anti-Semitic, but that the Nicaraguan government had launched a general assault on the freedom of Catholics, Evangelicals, Miskito Indians, Jews, and other groups. While instances of the Sandinista government restricting the activities of Catholics, Evangelicals, and Miskito Indians are well documented, whether the Sandinistas were antisemitic is a matter of dispute. The Anti-Defamation League supported the Reagan administration's charge of anti-semitism. However, investigations by various groups that were opposed to the Reagan administration's policies in Central America, including the progressive New Jewish Agenda, the American Jewish Committee, as well as an investigation by US Nicaraguan embassy staff, all found that the Sandinistas did not have a policy of anti-semitism, and or that they did not persecute individual Nicaraguan Jews solely because they were Jewish. These reports were disputed by Nicaraguan Jewish exiles, most of whom had not been interviewed, and who corroborated Reagan's charge of anti-Semitism, citing several instances of intimidation, harassment, and arbitrary arrest.

=== Sandinistas of Jewish Descent ===
While none of the Sandinistas identified with Judaism or the Jewish community, there were prominent Sandinistas of Jewish descent. Among them were Carlos Tünnerman, minister of education and later ambassador to the U.S.; Herty Lewites, minister of tourism in the 1980s and later mayor of Managua; and his brother Israel Lewites, a Sandinista leader. The Lewites brothers were sons of a Jewish immigrant from Poland and a Nicaraguan mother who raised them in Catholicism.

== 1990 to the present ==
After Daniel Ortega lost the 1990 presidential election, Jews started returning to Nicaragua. The Jewish community had its first bris in over 25 years when twins Jacob and Jonathan Gould, sons of Dr. Keith and Kathy Gould, had their bris performed by Rabbi Trager who flew in from Philadelphia in December 2004. After that, there was another bris for the Najman family and then some bar mitzvahs. There is a synagogue in the city of San Juan del Sur. On December 16, 2007, Nicaraguan Jews welcomed a new Torah after 28 years. On the following day, the Torah was used for the first time in a minyan at a bar mitzvah of a local Nicaraguan Jew.

The Jewish population in 2012 was estimated at around 50 people. That same year, 14 Nicaraguans converted to Judaism, most of whom were the children and grandchildren of Jewish men who married non-Jewish Nicaraguan women. Another 14 Nicaraguans converted in 2015. In 2017, there was a mass conversion of 114 Nicaraguans to Judaism, and 22 Jewish weddings were performed by rabbis from Israel and the US. Many of the 2017 converts trace their ancestry to Conversos. Kulanu, a New York-based nonprofit group that supports communities around the world seeking to learn about Judaism, facilitated the conversions.

== Notable persons ==
- William Abdalah, medical doctor and politician.
- Abraham Blauvelt, a Dutch-Jewish pirate, after whom the town of Bluefields was named
- Michael Gordon, composer
- Dr. Keith Gould, physician.
- Herty Lewites, Nicaraguan politician
- Francisca Batres Mayorga, merchant/business owner/realtor
- Gustavo Montiel, Police Chief of Managua, Chief of Military Intelligence, Chief of the National Guard under Somoza and Minister of Public Credit and Finance upon military retirement
- Laszlo Pataky, journalist and author
- Israel Lewites Rodríguez, Sandinista leader and martyr of the revolution.
- Luis "Lou" Ramirez, celebrity chef

== See also ==
- Demographics of Nicaragua
- History of the Jews in Latin America
  - List of Latin American Jews

== Bibliography ==
- Hunter, Jane, Israeli Foreign Policy: South Africa and Central America, South End Press, 1987.
- Kruckewitt, Joan, The Death of Ben Linder: The Story of a North American in Sandinista Nicaragua, Seven Stories Press, 1999.
