= Bill Stewart (journalist) =

American journalist and murder victim (1941–1979)

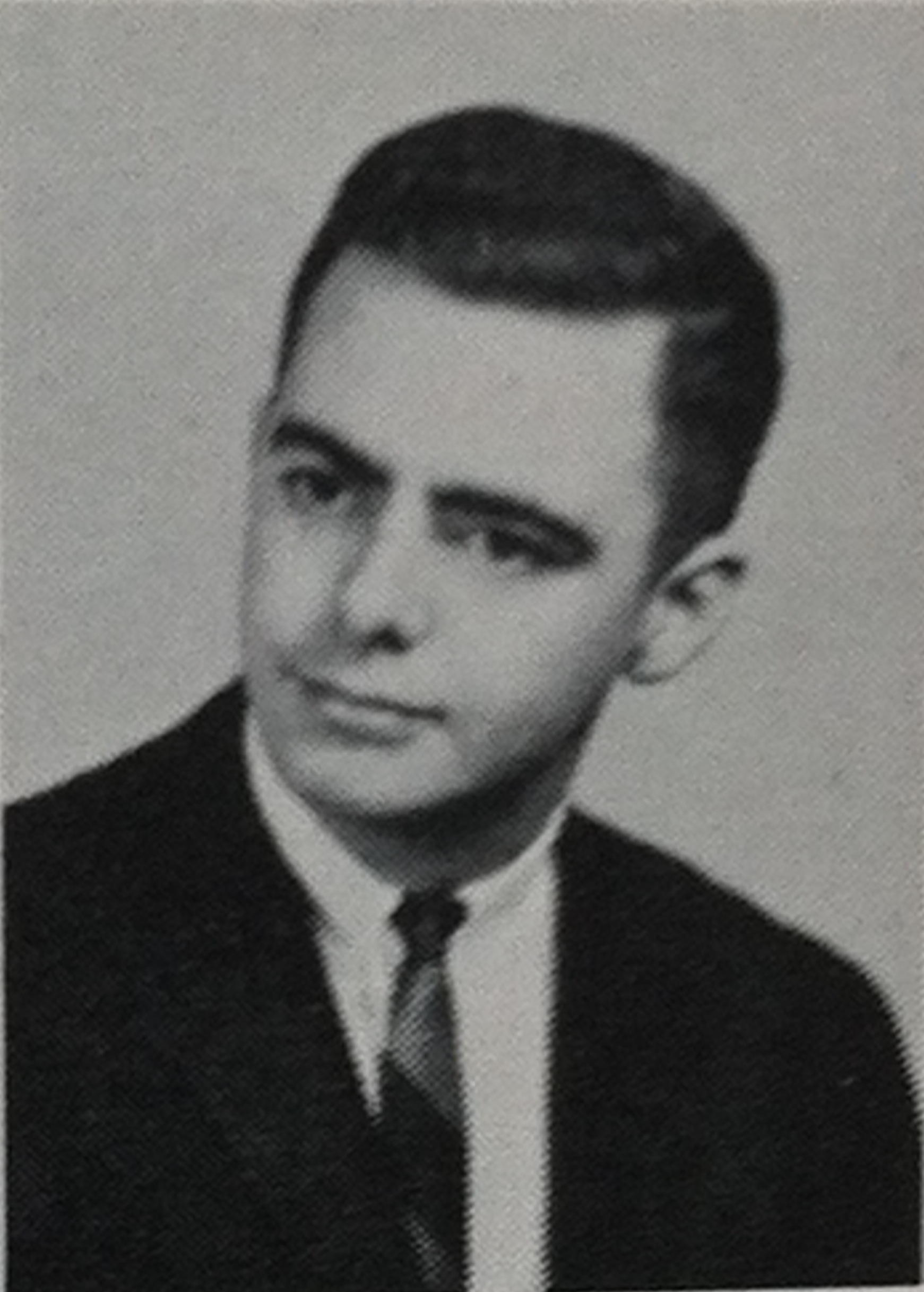
- Stewart in 1963
- Born: 1941; Huntington, West Virginia, U.S.
- Died: June 20, 1979 (aged 37); Managua, Nicaragua
- Cause of death: Execution by shooting
- Education: Ohio State University
- Occupation: Television journalist
- Known for: Murdered by the Nicaraguan National Guard

William D. Stewart (1941 – June 20, 1979) was an American journalist with ABC News who was murdered in 1979 by forces of the Nicaraguan National Guard (Guardia) while reporting on the Nicaraguan Revolution as Sandinista rebel forces were closing in on the capital city of Managua. Footage of his execution was repeatedly broadcast on network television, resulting in an uproar in the United States against the Somoza regime.

== Life and career ==
Stewart was from West Virginia and was a 1963 graduate of Ohio State University. While at Ohio State, he was active in many extracurricular activities including the Student Senate and the Sphinx honorary society, as well as a member of the Alpha Tau Omega fraternity. He came to ABC News from WCCO-TV in Minneapolis. He was an experienced foreign correspondent, and his assignments included coverage of the Iranian Revolution in February 1979. He had been in Nicaragua for 10 days reporting on the civil war between the Somoza dynasty and the leftist Sandinistas.

== Death ==
On June 20, 1979, Stewart was traveling in a press van in the eastern slums of the capital city of Managua with his camera and sound crew when they were stopped at a roadblock run by the Nicaraguan Guardia, President Anastasio Somoza Debayle's main force. The van was clearly marked as a press vehicle as a precaution, which had become standard practice as the insurgency and revolution increased in intensity. On the previous day, the government newspaper Novedades had run an editorial describing foreign journalists as "part of the vast network of communist propaganda".

Stewart and his 26-year-old Nicaraguan interpreter Juan Francisco Espinoza exited the vehicle and approached the barricade. Stewart presented official press credentials issued by the office of the Nicaraguan president. When they were a few meters away from the soldiers, cameraman Jack Clark began filming from inside the van. A guardsman ordered the men to separate, and Stewart was ordered first to kneel and then to lie face down on the ground. A soldier approached him, kicked him once in the ribs, then stepped back and shot him behind his right ear, killing him instantly. Espinoza was shot to death off-camera by a different soldier, apparently before Stewart was killed, after he approached the guards to ask their permission for an interview. Pablo Tiffer López was driving the ABC van, and he testified that a soldier remarked of Stewart, "I'm sure he's no journalist. He's a dog." He also testified that the soldiers commanded the news crew to report that a Sandinista sniper was responsible.

Stewart was 37 years old. He was survived by his wife Myrna and his parents. His body was retrieved by his crew and flown on a U.S. Air Force C-130 from Nicaragua to Panama, then transferred to an airplane sent by ABC and returned to the United States. He was buried in Ashland, Kentucky.

== Impact ==
The news crew smuggled the footage out of the country and sent it to New York. ABC, NBC, and CBS all ran it on their evening news broadcasts and repeatedly rebroadcast it in the following days. Millions of viewers in the United States and worldwide reacted with shock and outrage toward the Somoza regime. All three networks protested the killings by withdrawing their personnel from the country, with only CBS leaving a single correspondent to cover the conflict. President Jimmy Carter issued a statement describing the murder as "an act of barbarism that all civilized people condemn."

Shortly after the killings, the Nicaraguan national guard reported that they had arrested Corporal Lorenzo Brenes ("Brenis" in some reports), who they said was the soldier responsible for Stewart's murder, and that he would be "brought before legal officers". Brenes had been in command of the roadblock, and he testified before a military tribunal that he had not witnessed the shootings. He said that Stewart's killer was a "Private González" who was killed in combat later the same day. Brenes testified that the private related to him that he had killed Stewart "because he tried to run away". The ultimate fates of the Guardia soldiers responsible for the killings of Stewart and Espinoza are not known, due to the chaotic demise of the Somoza regime. Somoza fled Nicaragua for Miami on July 17, and the regime was overthrown on July 19, 1979, less than a month after Stewart's murder.

== Legacy ==
Footage of the incident appeared in the film Days of Fury (1979), directed by Fred Warshofsky and hosted by Vincent Price. The footage was also used in From the Ashes: Nicaragua Today, a documentary released in 1983.

A fictional version of Stewart's murder was told in the 1983 film Under Fire, starring Gene Hackman, Nick Nolte, and Joanna Cassidy. Hackman's Alex Grazier and Nolte's Russell Price are amalgamations of Bill Stewart's life and career as a journalist and war correspondent. The film presents Stewart's death differently: Hackman's character is shot in the chest while standing up, and his death is captured in a series of still images by Nolte's character, who escapes from the scene in a hail of gunfire. As in Stewart's case, in the film the images are shown to television audiences around the world, and the public outcry signals the end for the embattled Somoza dictatorship.

After the fall of Somoza, the new Sandinista government created a park in Stewart's honor in Managua. The park, established at the site in Barrio Riguero where he was killed, featured a cement monument and a plaque with the inscription "In memory of Bill Stewart. He did not die in a strange land, and we will cherish his memory because he is part of Free Nicaragua." By 1984, the park had fallen into disrepair as the government diverted funds from municipal budgets to the war effort against the Contras, and the park was maintained only by the volunteer Ricardo González, an elderly man who lived nearby and witnessed Stewart's murder. That year the American internationalist engineer Ben Linder, who lived in the area, and American nun Nancy Hanson persuaded the Committee of U.S. Citizens Living in Nicaragua to donate tools to González and pay him a monthly stipend for his work. In 1987, Bill Stewart Park was described as "not unlike the hundreds of street-corner memorials that pay tribute to neighborhood martyrs of the insurrection."

Joan Kruckewitt in The Death of Ben Linder provides an account of Stewart's death and its impact, as well as the creation and maintenance of Bill Stewart Park.

== Bibliography ==
- Kruckewitt, Joan, The Death of Ben Linder: The Story of a North American in Sandinista Nicaragua, Seven Stories Press, 1999.
