= Bibliography of Nicaragua =

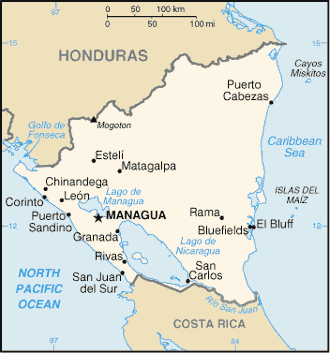
Nicaragua

This is a bibliography of selected works about Nicaragua.

== Bibliography ==
- Asleson, Vern. (2004) Nicaragua: Those Passed By. Galde Press ISBN 1-931942-16-1
- Babb, FE (2001). After revolution: mapping gender and cultural politics in neoliberal Nicaragua. Austin: University of Texas Press. ISBN 0-292-70900-5.
- Bayard de Volo, L (2001). Mothers of heroes and martyrs: gender identity politics in Nicaragua, 1979–1999. Baltimore: Johns Hopkins University Press. ISBN 0-8018-6764-9.
- Belli, G (14 October 2003). The Country Under My Skin : A Memoir of Love and War. Garden City, N.Y: Anchor. ISBN 1-4000-3216-4.
- Bermann, K (1986). Under the big stick: Nicaragua and the United States since 1848. Boston: South End Press. ISBN 0-89608-323-3.
- Bermúdez, E (Summer 1988). The Contras' Valley Forge: How I View the Nicaraguan Crisis. The Heritage Foundation.
- Borge, T (1992). The patient impatience: from boyhood to guerilla: a personal narrative of Nicaragua's struggle for liberation. Willimantic, Connecticut: Curbstone Press. ISBN 0-915306-97-2.
- Brown, TX (2001). The real Contra War: highlander peasant resistance in Nicaragua. Norman: University of Oklahoma Press. ISBN 0-8061-3252-3.
- Brunnegger, S (2007). From Conflict to Autonomy in Nicaragua: Lessons Learnt. London: Minority Rights Group International. ISBN 978-1-904584-61-2.
- Bugajski, J (1990). Sandinista communism and rural Nicaragua. New York: Praeger. ISBN 0-275-93536-1.
- Charlip, JA (2003). Cultivating Coffee: The Farmers of Carazo, Nicaragua, 1880–1930 (Ohio RIS Latin America Series). Athens, Ohio: Ohio University Press. ISBN 0-89680-227-2.
- Chomsky, Noam; Herman, Edward S. (2002). Manufacturing consent: the political economy of the mass media. New York: Pantheon Books. ISBN 0-375-71449-9.
- Christian, S (1986). Nicaragua, revolution in the family. New York: Vintage Books. ISBN 0-394-74457-8.
- Clark, GC (2001). With the Old Corps in Nicaragua. Novato, California: Presidio Press. ISBN 0-89141-737-0.
- Colburn, FD (1991). My car in Managua. Austin: University of Texas Press. ISBN 0-292-75124-9.
- Cox, Jack; Somoza, A; Earle, P (1980). Nicaragua Betrayed. Boston: Western Islands. ISBN 0-88279-235-0.
- Field, LW (1999). The grimace of Macho Ratón: artisans, identity, and nation in late-twentieth century western Nicaragua. Durham, N.C: Duke University Press. ISBN 0-8223-2288-9.
- Gilbert, DL (8 January 1991). Sandinistas: The Party And The Revolution. Cambridge, Massachusetts: Blackwell Publishers. ISBN 1-55786-006-8.
- Gobat, M (27 December 2005). Confronting the American Dream: Nicaragua under U.S. Imperial Rule (American Encounters/Global Interactions). Durham, N.C: Duke University Press. ISBN 0-8223-3634-0.
- Gordon, EW (1998). Disparate diasporas: identity and politics in an African Nicaraguan community. Austin, Tex: University of Texas Press, Austin, Institute of Latin American Studies. ISBN 0-292-72819-0.
- Gould, JL (1998). To die in this way: Nicaraguan Indians and the myth of mestizaje, 1880–1965. Durham, N.C: Duke University Press. ISBN 0-8223-2098-3.
- Hale, CR (1994). Resistance and Contradiction: Miskitu Indians and the Nicaraguan State, 1894–1987. Stanford, Calif: Stanford University Press. ISBN 0-8047-2800-3.
- Heyck, DLD (1990). Life stories of the Nicaraguan revolution. New York: Routledge. ISBN 0-415-90211-8.
- Horton, L (1998). Peasants In Arms: War & Peace in the Mountains of Nicaragua, 1979–1994 (Ohio RIS Latin America Series). Athens, Ohio: Ohio University Press. ISBN 0-89680-204-3.
- Kagan, RA (1996). A twilight struggle: American power and Nicaragua, 1977–1990. New York: Free Press. ISBN 0-02-874057-2.
- Kinzer, S (1991). Blood of Brothers: Life and War in Nicaragua. New York: Putnam. ISBN 0-399-13594-4.
- Kinzer, S (2006). Overthrow: America's Century of Regime Change from Hawaii to Iraq. New York: Times Books. ISBN 0-8050-7861-4.
- Kruckewitt, J (7 August 2001). The Death of Ben Linder: The Story of a North American in Sandinista Nicaragua. New York: Seven Stories Press. ISBN 1-58322-068-2.
- Lancaster, RN (1992). Life is hard: machismo, danger, and the intimacy of power in Nicaragua. Berkeley: University of California Press. ISBN 0-520-08929-4.
- Macaulay, N (1998). The Sandino Affair. Wacahoota Pr. ISBN 0-9653864-4-9.
- Marti-i-Puig, Salvador, N (1997). Nicaragua. La revolución enredada. 1980-1990. Libros de la Catarata. ISBN 9788483190104. free access: https://www.academia.edu/1621806/NICARAGUA_1979-1990._LA_REVOLUCIÓN_ENREDADA
- Marti-i-Puig, Salvador N; David Close; Shellet McConell, eds. (2011). The Sandinistas and Nicaragua since 1979. Lynne Rienner P. ISBN 978-1-62637-160-6.
- Morley, MH. Washington, Somoza and the Sandinistas: State and Regime in US Policy toward Nicaragua 1969–1981. Cambridge, UK: Cambridge University Press. ISBN 0-521-52335-4.
- Pardo-Maurer, R (1990). The Contras, 1980–1989: a special kind of politics. New York: Praeger. ISBN 0-275-93818-2.
- Plunkett, H (2002). In Focus Nicaragua a Guide to the People, Politics and Culture (In Focus Guides). Interlink Publishing Group. ISBN 1-56656-438-7.
- Randall, M (1995). Sandino's daughters: testimonies of Nicaraguan women in struggle. New Brunswick, N.J: Rutgers University Press. ISBN 0-8135-2214-5.
- Ratliff, William E.; Miranda, Roger (March 1992). Civil War in Nicaragua: Inside the Sandinistas. New Brunswick, N.J., U.S.A: Transaction Publishers. ISBN 1-56000-761-3.
- Rushdie, S (15 June 1997). The Jaguar Smile: A Nicaraguan Journey. Clearwater, Fla: Owl Books. ISBN 0-8050-5311-5.
- Sabia, D (1997). Contradiction and conflict: the popular church in Nicaragua. University: University of Alabama Press. ISBN 0-8173-0873-3.
- Sirias, S (27 April 2007). Bernardo and the Virgin: A Novel. Evanston, Ill: Northwestern University Press. ISBN 978-0-8101-2427-1.
- Sklar, H (1988). Washington's war on Nicaragua. Boston: South End Press. ISBN 0-89608-295-4.
- Taber, Michael; Bishop, Maurice; Marcus, Bruce (1983). Maurice Bishop speaks: the Grenada Revolution, 1979–83. New York: Pathfinder Press. ISBN 0-87348-619-6.
- United Nations Development Programme (2010). Regional Human Development Report for Latin America and the Caribbean 2010: Acting on the future: breaking the intergenerational transmission of inequality (PDF) (Report). New York: United Nations.
- Walker, TG (2003). Nicaragua, 4th Edition. Boulder, Colo: Westview Press. ISBN 0-8133-3882-4.
- Walker, WJ (1985). The war in Nicaragua. Tucson: University of Arizona Press. ISBN 0-8165-0882-8.
- Webb, G (1998). Dark Alliance : The CIA, the Contras, and the Crack Cocaine Explosion. New York: Seven Stories Press. ISBN 1-888363-68-1.
- Zimmermann, M (2000). Sandinista: Carlos Fonseca and the Nicaraguan revolution. Durham, N.C: Duke University Press. ISBN 0-8223-2595-0.

== See also ==
- List of books and films about Nicaragua
