= Vida de Menina =

2003 film directed by Helena Solberg

- Directed by: Helena Solberg
- Written by: Elena Soárez; Helena Solberg
- Based on: Minha Vida de Menina by Helena Morley
- Produced by: David Meyer
- Starring: Ludmila Dayer; Daniela Escobar; Dalton Vigh
- Cinematography: Pedro Farkas
- Edited by: Diana Vasconcellos
- Music by: Wagner Tiso
- Production company: Radiante Filmes
- Distributed by: Riofilme
- Release date: 2004
- Running time: 90 minutes
- Country: Brazil
- Language: Portuguese

Vida de Menina is a 2004 Brazilian drama film. It was the first feature-length fiction film directed by Helena Solberg. The film is an adaptation of Minha Vida de Menina, the diary of Helena Morley.

It won five awards at the 2004 Gramado Film Festival.

== Cast ==
- Ludmila Dayer as Helena Morley
- Daniela Escobar as Carolina
- Dalton Vigh as Alexandre
- Maria de Sá as Teodora
- Camilo Bevilacqua as Geraldo
- Lolô Souza Pinto as Madge
- Benjamim Abras as Teodomir
- Lígia Cortez as Iaiá

== Plot ==
The film takes place in Diamantina, Minas Gerais in the period following the abolition of slavery in Brazil. It focuses on the life of Helena Morley, an adolescent who tells her daily life in her diary which, when published in the 1950s, became internationally famous.
