= Carmen Canta Sambas =

Studio album by Carmen Miranda
- Released: March 12, 2007
- Recorded: 1935–1939
- Genre: Samba, MPB
- Length: 44:19
- Label: EMI Brazil

Carmen Canta Sambas is an album by Portuguese-born Brazilian samba singer Carmen Miranda, released in 2007 by EMI Brazil.

== Track listing ==
No.	Title	Writer(s)	Length
1.	"E Bateu-Se a Chapa"	Assis Valente	2:58
2.	"Isso Não Se Atura"	Assis Valente	2:56
3.	"O Tic-Tac do Meu Coração"	Alcyr Pires Vermelho / Walfrido Silva	2:28
4.	"Adeus Batucada"	Synval Silva	2:51
5.	"Entra no Cordão"	André Filho	2:55
6.	"O Samba e o Tango"	Amado Régis	2:45
7.	"Gente Bamba"	Synval Silva	2:57
8.	"Cachorro Vira-Lata"	Alberto Ribeiro	2:49
9.	"Imperador Do Samba"	Waldemar Silva	2:26
10.	"Cabaret no Morro"	Herivelto Martins	2:44
11.	"Fon-Fon"	Alberto Ribeiro / João de Barro	2:43
12.	"Samba Rasgado"	Portello Juno / W. Falcão	2:29
13.	"... E O Mundo Não Se Acabou"	Assis Valente	3:00
14.	"Quem Condena a Batucada"	Nelson Petersen	2:49
15.	"Deixa Falar!"	Nelson Petersen	3:01
16.	"Uva de Caminhão"	Assis Valente	2:28
