= Erick Barreto =

Brazilian actor

- Born: Eric Paes Barreto Gomes; 28 June 1962; Garanhuns, Pernambuco, Brazil
- Died: May 3, 1996 (aged 33); Rio de Janeiro, Brazil
- Occupation(s): Actor, female impersonator
- Parent(s): Mário Gomes (father), Zaire Paes Barreto Gomes (mother)
- Relatives: Metturo (cousin)

Eric Paes Barreto Gomes (28 June 1962 – 3 May 1996), better known as Erick Barreto, was a Brazilian actor and female impersonator. He gained national attention for his tributes to Carmen Miranda, whom he portrayed both on stage and in the docudrama Carmen Miranda: Bananas Is My Business (1995), directed by Helena Solberg.

== Biography ==
=== Early life and education ===
Erick Barreto was born in Garanhuns, Pernambuco, to Mário Gomes and Zaire Paes Barreto Gomes. Before entering the performing arts, he worked as a bank manager.

He is the cousin of Brazilian actor Metturo.

=== Career ===
Erick Barreto adopted the stage persona Diana Finsk and performed impersonations of various international pop stars. However, it was his portrayal of Carmen Miranda that brought him broader public recognition. During a performance at a Brigitte Blair show, Barreto's interpretation of Carmen caught the attention of Aurora Miranda, Carmen's sister, who recommended him to filmmaker Helena Solberg. Barreto was later cast to portray Carmen in reenacted scenes for the 1995 film Carmen Miranda: Bananas Is My Business.

He became a prominent figure in Rio's LGBTQ+ performance scene and carnival circuit. Barreto stood out at Rio de Janeiro's Sambadrome, parading in five different samba schools, always as Carmen Miranda. He also became well known for his performances with the "Banda Carmen Miranda." In addition to Carmen, Barreto portrayed icons such as Clara Nunes, Elis Regina, Elba Ramalho, Cazuza, Liza Minnelli, and Vanusa.

Barreto's legacy influenced later generations of drag performers and was cited as an inspiration for fictional characters like "Elis Miranda" in Brazilian television.

== Death ==
Barreto died on 3 May 1996 at the Evangelical Hospital of Tijuca, Rio de Janeiro, due to complications from AIDS. He lived alone in the Vila Isabel neighborhood. He was buried on 4 May 1996 in the Cemitério de São João Batista in Botafogo, the same cemetery where Carmen Miranda is interred.

== Legacy ==
Barreto is remembered as a pioneer in Brazilian drag and performance art. His trajectory is frequently referenced in studies on gender performance and Brazilian pop culture.
