= South American Way =

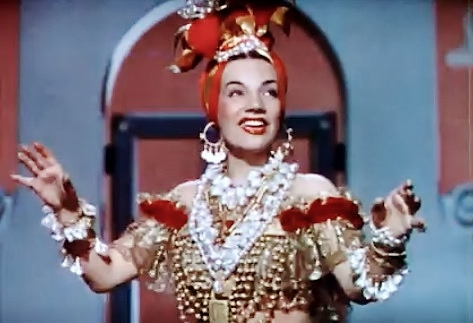
- Carmen Miranda in performance of "South American Way" in Down Argentine Way.

Song by Carmen Miranda
- Language: Portuguese
- Released: December 26, 1939
- Label: Decca Records
- Songwriter(s): Al Dubin
- Composer(s): Jimmy McHugh

"South American Way" is a 1939 song with music by Jimmy McHugh and lyrics by Al Dubin. Carmen Miranda introduced the song in the 1939 Broadway musical The Streets of Paris. Miranda performed it on-screen a year later in her breakout role for U.S. audiences in the film Down Argentine Way (1940), causing it to become very popular in the United States.

== Versions ==
The song became very popular in the United States, and had cover versions by several international artists, and as part of the soundtrack of many American films.

Artist	Year
Guy Lombardo	1939
Al Donahue & His Orchestra	1939
The Andrews Sisters & Glenn Miller & Orchestra	1940
Pat Kirkwood	1941
Dinah Shore	1941
Marlene Dietrich	1947
Gordon MacRae, Lucille Norman & The Sportsmen Quartet	1949
Marisa Monte	1988
Rebecca Kilgore & Dave Frishberg	1996
Sonia Santana	2004
Arielle Dombasle	2006
Frankie Carle	2007

== In movies ==
Film	Director	Year
Down Argentine Way	Irving Cummings	1940
In This Our Life	John Huston	1942
Mildred Pierce	Michael Curtiz	1945
Class of '44	Paul Bogart	1973
Radio Days	Woody Allen	1987
Carmen Miranda: Bananas is My Business	Helena Solberg	1995
