= Memória de Helena =

1969 film directed by David Neves

- Directed by: David Neves
- Screenplay by: José Joffily; Nelson Nadotti
- Based on: My Girl Life by Helena Morley
- Produced by: Júlio Bressane; Júlio Graber; David Neves
- Cinematography: David Drew Zingg
- Edited by: João Ramiro Mello
- Production companies: Filmes da Matriz; Estrela Dalva Produções
- Release date: 1969
- Running time: 80 minutes
- Country: Brazil
- Language: Portuguese

Memória de Helena is a 1969 Brazilian drama film directed by David Neves, based on the novel My Girl Life by Helena Morley.

== Cast ==
- Rosa Maria Penna as Helena
- Adriana Prieto
- Arduíno Colassanti
- Joel Barcellos as Andre
- Humberto Mauro
- Olga Danitch
- Áurea Campos
- Neila Tavares
- Mair Tavares

== Awards ==
1969: Brasília Film Festival

1. Best Film (won)
2. Best Director (David Neves) (won)
3. Best Cinematography (David Drew Zingg) (won)
