= Dayrell =

Dayrell may refer to:

- Alice Dayrell Caldeira Brant (1880–1970), Brazilian juvenile writer
- Anthony Walter Dayrell Brooke, (1912–2011), appointed His Highness the Rajah Muda of Sarawak on 25 August 1937
- Bertram Willes Dayrell Brooke (1876–1965), member of the family of White Rajahs who ruled Sarawak for a hundred years
- Lillingstone Dayrell, village in Buckinghamshire, England
