= Carmen Miranda: Bananas Is My Business =

1995 film directed by Helena Solberg

- Cover of the DVD release
- Directed by: Helena Solberg
- Written by: Helena Solberg
- Produced by: Helena Solberg; David Meyer
- Starring: Cynthia Adler; Erick Barreto; Mario Cunha; Alice Faye; Aurora Miranda; Carmen Miranda; Leticia Monte; Rita Moreno; Cesar Romero; Synval Silva; Helena Solberg Narrator
- Distributed by: Radiante Filmes (Brazil); Cinema International Corporation (International); PBS and Fox Lorber Home Video (USA)
- Release date: May 13, 1995 (Brazil)
- Running time: 91 minutes
- Countries: United States; Brazil; United Kingdom
- Languages: English; Portuguese

Carmen Miranda: Bananas is My Business is a 1995 documentary filmed and directed by Helena Solberg. This documentary chronicles the life and career of Carmen Miranda, Hollywood's symbol of Latin American spirit in the 1940s. The documentary tells her life story in a series of stages, beginning with her roots and rise to stardom in her home country of Brazil, her transition and development as a performer in the United States, first on Broadway in New York City, then in the film industry after she signed with 20th Century Fox in Los Angeles, and her later years in life, before her death and her return to Brazil. Helena Solberg uses two different film styles, biography and directorial reverie, in which Solberg uses actor Erick Barretos to “resurrect Carmen Miranda in several fantasy sequences. Helena Solberg's attitudes shift throughout the documentary from awe-struck child to empathetic and forgiving Brazilian woman, which she uses to represent the contradictory subplots of Carmen Miranda's life. Alongside the fantasy like resurrection of Miranda, Solberg accompanies her documentary with multiple interviews with Carmen Miranda's friends and family, like her sister, her first boyfriend, the guitarist Laurindo Almeida, samba song-writer Synval Silva, Cesar Romero, and Alice Faye.

== Brief synopsis ==
Born in 1909, Carmen Miranda was already famous in Brazil during the 1930s; her discovery by Broadway impresario Lee Shubert in 1939 made her an international star. The film tracks Miranda's ascent in popularity, from singer and dancer in Rio de Janeiro to Broadway and Hollywood (where she became, in 1945, the highest paid female entertainer in the U.S.). Her success came with a price tag: she was caught between being a "real" Latin American or being Hollywood's version of one—with all the notoriety and fortune it would bring. Today Miranda is a cult figure, known mainly for her exuberant renditions of such songs as "South American Way" and "The Lady in the Tutti-Frutti Hat," performed in garish costumes topped with fruit-filled turbans.

=== The career start ===
Carmen Miranda, an almost ghostly character in the imagination of Portuguese, Brazilian, and American audiences, comes back to life in the first scene of the documentary as a dream narrated by Helena Solberg. Images from her memorial service in Rio de Janeiro follow, showing the grief of her Brazilian fans as she says goodbye to what she considered her homeland. Born in the small Portuguese village of Varzea da Ovelha e Aliviada on February 9, 1909, Carmen was appropriated by the people of her village as a symbol of success. Making use of interviews with her younger sister Aurora Miranda, the documentary tales the migration story of Carmen, from Portugal to Brazil, where they arrived in November 1909. Carmen Miranda, daughter of a modest barber, Jose Maria Pinto da Cunha, lived in Rio de Janeiro. There, while working at a hat store, she was first discovered as a singing talent, growing up in Rio de Janeiro, as a working class adolescent, she noticed the strong influence of Samba music as a powerful cultural aspect of life in Rio's slums.

Embracing that current as a way of expressing herself as an artist, Carmen rose through the radio ranks, while “In those days, a girl that sang on the radio was frowned upon… In a world dominated by man, she was able to navigate through those struggles.”As a local artist, she kept a close relationship with composer Synval Silva and Laurindo Almeida until she left for the United States. This opportunity came in 1939, when she performed along her band of Brazilian musicians. Carmen Miranda embarked on The Normandy for New York after being signed by Lee Shubert, who included her in the cast for Broadway play 'The Streets of Paris'. This was the episode that transformed the life of who was later to be known as 'The Brazilian Bombshell'. Once in New York, Carmen Miranda showed how her extravagant looks, and beautiful voice spoke for her, although her American audience could not understand a word she was speaking.

=== Career in the United States and the fight for her identity ===
As she became more popular, and stories about her success were heard in Brazil through the media, Brazilians were skeptical of Carmen Miranda's success in New York. Carmen Miranda found herself fighting tirelessly to prove her identity as a Brazilian, but also to keep the attention from her American audience. Her appropriation of the style would win her many enemies within Brazil, as she represented a sector of Brazilian culture, the Afro-Brazilian, who represented not only the racialized other according to Brazil’s white elite, but were also a threat to national identity. The press and the elite constantly attacked her image, many who “looked at her as an embarrassment and an affront to their cultural heritage”.

Helena Solberg also suggests that Miranda's image was exploited and used by the United States Government during World War II as part of its Good Neighbor Policy, towards Latin America, whose natural resources were vital and needed to fight the war. Even though this would bring credibility to her image, Carmen, in one of her many identities, would eventually lead her to even larger criticism. When Carmen became a blond for her movies in Hollywood, when the World War II was over, the audience back in Brazil bashed her with critics once again, this time saying that she was too ‘Americanized’ However, her American audience seemed to be captivated by the exotic and colorful style of the singer/actress.

She was sensually silly, a comical icon of fertility, and friendliness that threatened no one. Time after time, Carmen Miranda was consumed by sadness, since she knew that her beloved public image as Carmen Miranda was a commodity to be consumed by U.S. audiences, while her value to her people in Brazil declined as she was considered “Americanized.” Solberg includes interviews with Rita Moreno, who offers her critique of Hollywood's stereotyping of Latin American women as "always left by the guy, you had to be vivacious, fiery! an exaggeration."

Opinions differ about Carmen's image, Cesar Romero says she was out of step with the times, a novelty that wore off. But Alice Faye and others deny that she could have changed her image and still been employed: “You could argue [with the studio],” she says, “but then you were suspended.”

=== Death and the aftermath ===
The final stage of the movie chronicles the events leading up to Carmen Miranda's death. In the documentary, Helena Solberg used interviews with Carmen Miranda's closest friends and workers, such as her housekeeper, to show that her troubled marriage to filmmaker David Sebastian and exhausting work schedule led to a deep depression. With doctors' orders, Carmen Miranda took a leave from work and traveled back to Brazil to rest for several weeks. Upon her return to Los Angeles, Carmen Miranda appeared on the NBC television series The Jimmy Durante Show where on August 4, 1955, Carmen Miranda suffered a mild heart attack after completing a dance number with Jimmy Durante. Carmen Miranda fell to her knees, upon which Jimmy Durante told the band to “stop the music” as he helped her to her feet as she laughed, “I'm all out of breath!” Carmen Miranda would finish the show only to later suffer a second, fatal heart attack in her Beverly Hills home.

The documentary showed the service that was held in Los Angeles as well as the return of her body to Rio de Janeiro in accordance with her last wishes. Upon her arrival, the Brazilian government declared a period of national mourning as more than 60,000 people attended a ceremony at the Rio town hall and more than half a million escorted her casket to her final resting place.

== Cast ==
- Alice Faye — Herself
- Aloísio de Oliveira — Himself
- Aurora Miranda — Herself
- Carmen Miranda — Herself (archive footage)
- Caribé da Rocha — Himself
- Cássio Barsante — Himself
- Cesar Romero — Himself
- Cynthia Adler — Hedda Hopper
- Erick Barreto — Carmen Miranda (Fantasy Sequences)
- Estela Romero — Herself
- Helena Solberg — Herself (Narrator)
- Ivan Jack — Himself
- Jeanne Allan — Herself
- Jorge Guinle — Himself
- Laurindo Almeida — Himself
- Letícia Monte — Carmen Miranda (teenager)
- Mario Cunha — Himself
- Raul Smandek — Himself
- Rita Moreno — Herself
- Synval Silva — Himself
- Ted Allan — Himself

== Background ==
=== Production ===
"I believe that the vision in relation the figure Carmen's is changing, people are seeing more clearly the impact she caused in both the culture of Brazil, and in the United States. Her legacy is being more valued, in the 40s, there was an elite that did not want see the country's image associated with Carmen and her songs. But she remains a strong icon, that your image follows arousing the interest of different generations."

— Helena Solberg about Carmen Miranda.

The film was produced by David Mayer and Helena Solberg, with cinematography by Pole Tomasz Magierski; the rest of the team changed depending on the country where the documentary was being filmed. The film was funded by the Corporation for Public Broadcasting, Public Broadcasting Service, Channel 4 (UK), Radio and Television of Portugal and RioFilme.

The film had a high cost for a documentary, around US$550,000, due to the image rights paid to major studios for the use of Carmen Miranda movies. Through searching, the producers found new images until then unreleased, including home movies of the singer herself, which added a new cost to the use rights.

=== Release ===
The documentary had its world premiere at the 27th Brasilia Film Festival in December 1994, where it won the Audience Award for Best Film, the Special Jury Prize, and the Film Critics' Award. In the U.S., it premiered in New York at the Film Forum and has been televised nationally by the PBS in the POV series.

The docudrama received several awards and was well received by critics at festivals in Chicago, Locarno, Toronto, Melbourne, Yamagata, and London, and closed the year in Havana.

=== Soundtrack ===
| Song | Performance | Note(s) |
|---|---|---|
| "Adeus Batucada" | Synval Silva | (during the closing credits) |
| "Aquarela do Brasil" | Carmen Miranda | Performance of the film The Gang's All Here (1943). |
| "Ao Voltar da Batucada" | Synval Silva | |
| "A Week-End in Havana" | Carmen Miranda | Performance of the film Week-End in Havana (1941). |
| "Boneca de Pixe" | Carmen Miranda | |
| "Cai, Cai" | Carmen Miranda | Performance of the film That Night in Rio (1941). |
| "Chica Chica Boom Chic" | Carmen Miranda | Performance of the film That Night in Rio (1941). |
| "Camisa Listada" | Carmen Miranda | |
| "Cantores de Rádio" | Aurora Miranda; Carmen Miranda | Performance of the film Hello, Hello, Carnival! (1936). |
| "Coração" | Synval Silva | |
| "Disseram que Voltei Americanizada" | Erick Barreto | (as Carmen Miranda) |
| "Diz que tem" | Carmen Miranda | |
| "I Like You Very Much" | Carmen Miranda; Erick Barreto | Performance of the short film Sing With The Stars; (as Carmen Miranda) |
| "I Make My Money With Bananas" | Erick Barreto | (as Carmen Miranda) |
| "K-K-K-Katy" | Carmen Miranda | Performance of the short film Sing With The Stars |
| "O que é que a baiana tem?" | Carmen Miranda | Performance of the film Banana da Terra (1939). |
| "O Samba e o Tango" | Carmen Miranda | |
| "P'rá Você Gostar de Mim" (Taí) | Carmen Miranda | |
| "Primavera no Rio" | Carmen Miranda | |
| "South American Way" | Carmen Miranda | Performance of the film Down Argentine Way (1940). |
| "Street of Dreams" | The Ink Spots | |
| "Tico-Tico no Fubá" | Carmen Miranda | Performance of the short film Sing With The Stars |
| "The Lady In The Tutti Frutti Hat" | Carmen Miranda | Performance of the film The Gang's All Here (1943). |
| "The Soul Of Carmen Miranda" | John Cale | (during the beginning of the credits) |

=== Festivals ===
| Festival | Country | Year |
|---|---|---|
| Melbourne International Film Festival | Australia | 1995 |
| Locarno International Film Festival | Switzerland | 1995 |
| Toronto International Film Festival | Canada | 1995 |
| Yamagata International Documentary Film Festival | Japan | 1995 |
| BFI London Film Festival | England | 1995 |
| International Film Festival Rotterdam | Netherlands | 1996 |
| Göteborg International Film Festival | Sweden | 1996 |
| Santa Barbara International Film Festival | United States | 1996 |
| Rencontres de Cinema d'amérique Latine | France | 1996 |
| Festival international de films de femmes de Créteil | France | 1996 |
| Hong Kong International Film Festival | Hong Kong | 1996 |
| Mostra Internacional de Films de Dones de Barcelona | Spain | 1996 |
| Jerusalem Film Festival | Israel | 1996 |
| Galway Film Fleadh | Ireland | 1996 |
| Wellington Film Festival | New Zealand | 1996 |
| The London Latin American Film Festival | England | 1996 |
| Helsinki Film Festival | Switzerland | 1996 |
| Films from the South | Norway | 1996 |
| Festival de Cine Realizado por Mujeres | Spain | 1996 |
| International Women's Film Festival Dortmund | France | 1999 |
| Flying Broom International Women's Film Festival | Turkey | 2000 |
| It's All True – International Documentary Film Festival | Brazil | 2014 |

== Repercussion ==
The film was extremely well received by American criticism. In Brazil, was acquired by networks Canal Brasil and TV Cultura, and the cable channels GNT and Curta!. In Latin America, by the Discovery Channel and Film&Arts. In the United States aired nationally by PBS network, and in France by Canal Plus.

=== Accolades ===
| Year | Awards Group | Category | Country | Result |
|---|---|---|---|---|
| 1994 | 27º Festival de Brasília do Cinema Brasileiro | Best Documentary | Brazil | Won |
| 1994 | 27º Festival de Brasília do Cinema Brasileiro | Jury's Special Award | Brazil | Won |
| 1994 | 27º Festival de Brasília do Cinema Brasileiro | Critics Award | Brazil | Won |
| 1995 | Havana Film Festival | Best Documentary | Cuba | Won |
| 1995 | Chicago International Film Festival | Best Documentary | United States | Won |
| 1995 | Yamagata International Documentary Film Festival | Best Documentary | Japan | Nominated |
| 1996 | Uruguay International Film Festival | Best Documentary | Uruguay | Won |
| 1996 | Encontro Internacional de Cinema de Portugal | Best Film - Popular Jury | Portugal | Won |

=== Critical reception ===
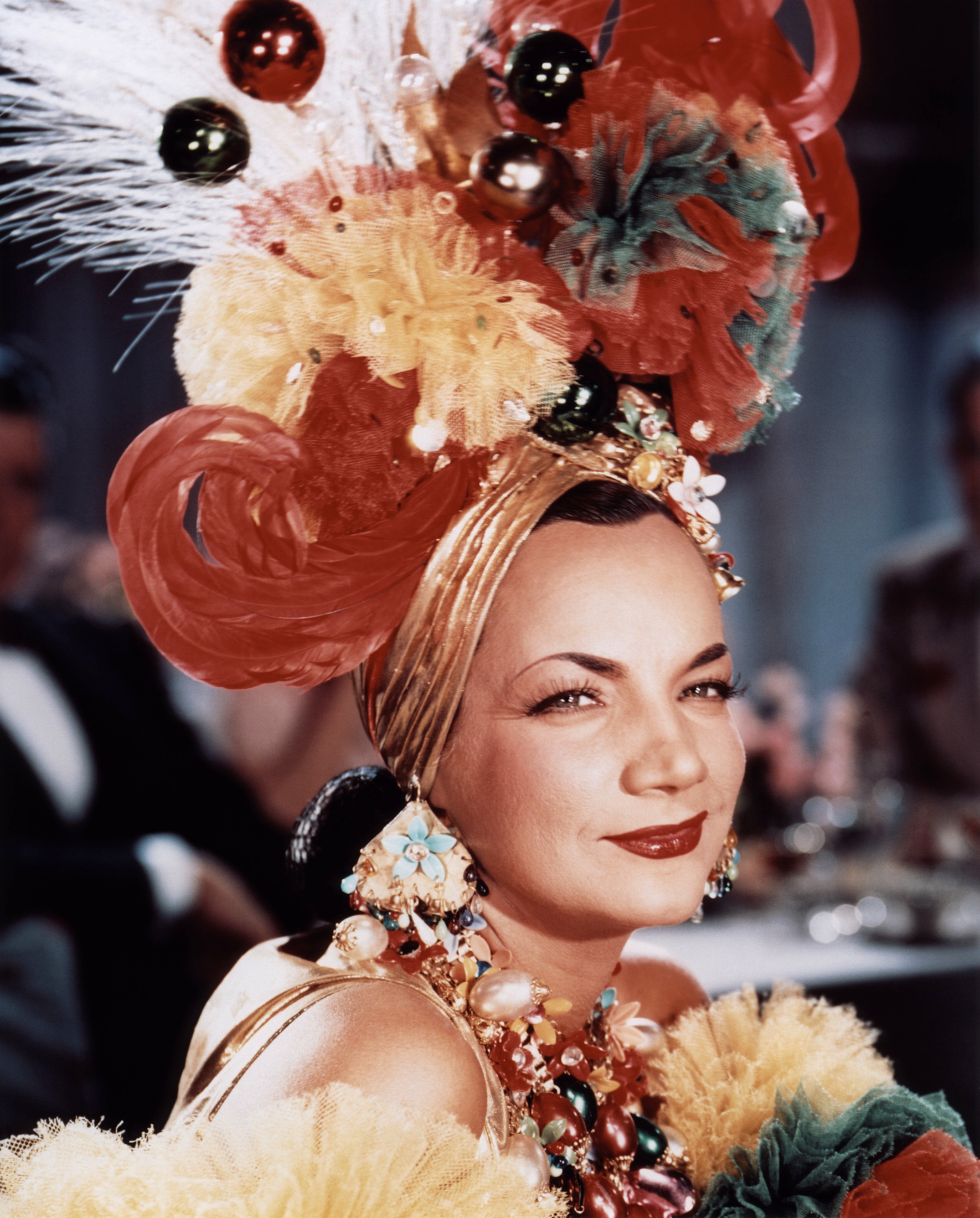
Carmen Miranda in the Hollywood film Week-End in Havana (1941).

The New York Daily News review noted that "Carmen Miranda remains one of the most immediately recognizable images in movie history, an explosion of fantasy, energy and playful eroticism". The documentary directed by Helena Solberg was described as " a complex, personal and moving study of a great entertainer who became a victim of the cultural moment she embodied".

Stephen Holden, a critic for the New York Times, praised the documentary as "richly contemplative" and stated that Bananas Is My Business portrays Carmen Miranda as "a tragic figure, trapped in her exotic persona of the Brazilian bombshell." He concluded by saying, "It's sad to note that Hollywood, after crowning her with bananas, could think of nothing else to do with her except turn that image into a joke". In his review of the film, Amy Taubin of The Village Voice—who called the film as "fabulous and dazzling".

The Los Angeles Times described the documentary as "perceptive and poignant". Godfrey Cheshire, from Variety, stated that Bananas Is My Business "offers a fascinating account of a mega star, imprisoned by a dizzying image that reflects various intertwined political and cultural agendas". Juan M. Mendez of the El Daily News said in his review that "Miranda reemerges as the woman she truly was; this is her true comeback".

On the other hand, USA Today highlighted that the "documentary is too cluttered for its own good, but rare archival footage and interviews with Miranda's friends, lovers and relatives redeem it". Michael Wilmington's review in the Chicago Tribune, praised the film for presenting Miranda in "a serious context: as a musical artist who distilled the souls and feelings of her people, who was stolen from them by Hollywood and who died, too young at 46". He emphasized Miranda's significance as "a Brazilian artist and institution", although he pointed out that, despite good interviews with figures like Cesar Romero, Rita Moreno, and producer/arranger Aloysio de Oliveira, the film contains "dramatic recreations are overblown" and a "painful and questionable" narration. Overall, he found it "interesting." Marjorie Baumgarten of The Austin Chronicle, observed that Bananas Is My Business "is a documentary that wants to find the person behind the stereotyped Hollywood icon". Jay Carr described the film as "moving and unforgettable" in The Boston Globe.

New York Magazine gave a negative review, stating that the film "fails in several aspects", particularly highlighting the dramatic recreations of Carmen Miranda and Helena Solberg's choice to frame the narrative as a personal quest to discover the real Carmen. According to the magazine, "Solberg's personal commentary adds nothing", and the time would have been better spent with more interviews, like the one with Rita Moreno, who provides "some brief spicy comments". Ken Ringle's review in the Washington Post, described the film as "provocative, affectionate and intelligent", calling it "a treasure trove of fascinating accounts". Time Out commented that "the most interesting material here relates to Miranda's role as a national symbol for Brazilians, and as the embodiment of Roosevelt's Good Neighbor policy during WWII". The review highlighted her "exuberant personality", noting that in Hollywood, Carmen never varied her style, which, according to the magazine, explains why she was "crushed under the weight of all those bananas".

Tim Purtell's review in Entertainment Weekly said that Bananas Is My Business traces the journey of the "Brazilian Bombshell," from her beginnings as a hat saleswoman and South American star to her stereotyping in Hollywood as a "Latin bimbo". He praised the use of interviews with her sister and several musicians and composers, mixed with dramatic reconstructions, but emphasized that "the show belongs to Carmen (herself)—in clips, home movies, and rare archival footage", showcasing her "delirious, inimitable vitality". Chicago Reader's film critic, Jonathan Rosenbaum, observed that the documentary is "highly personal and informative", focusing on "a woman who became a campy “bombshell”. David Hiltbrand wrote in People magazine that "this documentary is also an unusually personal essay about Miranda's enduring impact on Pan-American culture and on the imagination of Brazilian filmmaker Helena Solberg". He emphasized that the film combines "together news, interviews with intimates, vibrant Technicolor footage from Miranda's films and chimerical dream sequences featuring Carmen impersonator Erik Barreto", creating a portrait with both "depth and flair".

Barry Walters, in his review for the San Francisco Chronicle, compared Miranda to "a Madonna," noting that she "never had the freedom to change her image with the passing seasons". According to Walters, Solberg "captures the pain of her crippling fame", resulting in a film that is "entertaining and deeply moving", making the viewer "never think of Carmen Miranda the same way again". Roger Hurlburt's review of the movie, he noted that "before adopting the fruit-laden turbans that became her trademark, Miranda was a night club and radio singer". He emphasized that Miranda faced the challenge of balancing two cultures: in Brazil, the press accused her of "selling out to Hollywood", while in Hollywood, studio heads confined her to a "self-mocking image that made her a top moneymaker". Hurlburt concluded that Bananas Is My Business "examines with sensitivity and integrity the myth that was Carmen Miranda".

In its review, TV Guide praised director Helena Solberg for uncovering "fascinating material about Miranda's early life and importance within Brazilian pop culture". The review highlighted that, instead of presenting her as a "goofy Latin bomshell," the film portrays Miranda as "a remarkably canny manipulator of her own star persona and career".

In Brazil, Sônia Nolasco wrote for O Estado de S. Paulo that "there are so many surprises and revelations in Bananas Is My Business that the viewer feels embarrassed to ignore the greatness of our greatest export". Inácio Araújo, a critic for Folha de S. Paulo, described Bananas Is My Business as "a beautiful documentary in which Helena Solberg sketches the profile and trajectory that led Carmen Miranda to international fame and an early death". He noted that, in the re-enactment sections, "every attempt to imitate Carmen falls short of her (especially in the dance)," but concluded that "the documentary part fully compensates for this flaw". Arnaldo Jabor, also writing for Folha de S. Paulo, stated that "Helena Solberg and David Meyer, through research and lyricism, went beyond a mere documentary and redefined not only the rise and fall of Carmen Miranda but also a portrait of our fragility. One must watch Bananas Is My Business to see who we are".

On review aggregator website Rotten Tomatoes, the film holds an approval rating of 80% based on 5 reviews, with an average rating of 6.0/10.
