= Traição =

- Directed by: Arthur Fontes; José Henrique Fonseca; Cláudio Torres
- Written by: Patrícia Melo; Fernanda Torres; Mauricio Zacharias; Cláudio Torres
- Starring: Pedro Cardoso; Fernanda Torres; Alexandre Borges; Ludmila Dayer; Daniel Dantas; Drica Moraes
- Production company: Conspiração Filmes
- Release date: 26 February 1999
- Running time: 104 minutes
- Country: Brazil
- Language: Portuguese

Traição is a 1998 Brazilian drama film directed by Arthur Fontes, José Henrique Fonseca, and Cláudio Torres, with a screenplay based on short stories from the book A Vida como Ela É... by Nelson Rodrigues. The film received awards for Best Director, Best Supporting Actor for Francisco Cuoco, and Best Supporting Actress for Ludmila Dayer at the 31st Brasília Film Festival.

== Plot ==
The film is based on three short stories adapted from the works of Nelson Rodrigues, all revolving around the theme of infidelity — some infused with moments of humour, others culminating in more tragic outcomes. Traição presents the story of a man who falls in love with a married woman; a segment in which a young woman draws the attention of her sister's fiancé; and a third tale concerning an unfaithful wife who is taken hostage by her husband after he discovers that she has been betraying him with his best friend.

== Cast ==
- Tuca Andrada as husband (segment "O Primeiro Pecado")
- Alexandre Borges as husband
- Pedro Cardoso as Mário
- Francisco Cuoco as Argemiro Santos
- Daniel Dantas as Geraldo
- Ludmila Dayer as Alice
- Jorge Dória as Reinaldo
- José Henrique Fonseca as the lover
- Fernanda Montenegro as the woman at the bar (segment "O Primeiro Pecado"), Dagmar's mother (segment "Diabólica"), woman at the hotel (segment "Cachorro!")
- Drica Moraes as wife
- Dandara Ohana as Bianca
- Tonico Pereira as Jordão (segment "O Primeiro Pecado"), Geraldo's friend (segment "Diabólica")
- Joel Silva
- Fernanda Torres as Irene (segment "O Primeiro Pecado"), Dagmar (segment "Diabólica")

== Reception ==
Cecilia Barroso, from the website Cenas de Cinema, stated that Traição is yet another adaptation of Nelson Rodrigues' stories, consisting of three episodes that address the theme of infidelity, "a recurring theme in the work of Nelson, an expert on taboos." Regarding "O Primeiro Pecado", she notes that "the screenplay seems to lose its rhythm and becomes rather confusing" and that, "despite the good performances, it fails to take off." As for "Diabólica", she observes that it is "better than the first," but that "the screenplay does not seem to have kept pace with Nelson's full capacity for resolution." Concerning "Cachorro!", she considers it "without a doubt, the best of the episodes," with influences from Tarantino, though she adds that "it is not the best story." Finally, she concludes that the film "falls short when compared to the series A Vida como ela É" and that, although it is "interesting, it is far from being an indispensable work."
