= Lino (film) =

2017 Brazilian animated film

Lino: An Adventure of Seven Lives
- Directed by: Rafael Ribas
- Written by: Rafael Ribas
- Produced by: Start Anima
- Edited by: Marcelo Moraes
- Music by: Alexandre Guerra
- Production companies: Start Anima; Fox International Productions
- Distributed by: Fox Film do Brasil
- Release date: September 7, 2017 (BR)
- Running time: 94 minutes
- Country: Brazil
- Language: Portuguese
- Budget: R$8 million
- Box office: R$3.3 million (Brazil)

Lino: An Adventure of Seven Lives (also simply known as Lino) is a 2017 Brazilian CGI animated comedy film directed by Rafael Ribas. Produced by Start Anima and distributed by Fox Film do Brasil, the story follows a children's party entertainer who becomes trapped inside his giant cat costume and must find a wizard to regain his human form.

== Plot ==
Lino, tired of his life entertaining children in a giant cat costume, consults a mystic wizard, but a botched spell transforms him permanently into the cat. He must undertake a journey to find the wizard and reclaim his identity—learning lessons of self-worth along the way.

== Voice cast ==
- Selton Mello as Lino
- Paolla Oliveira as Patty
- Dira Paes as Janine
- Luís Carlos de Moraes as Don Leo
- Rafael Ribas as the Wizard
- Metturo as an extra character (voice)

== Production ==
Created over four years by more than 120 professionals, Lino was one of Brazil’s most ambitious fully CGI-animated feature films of its time.

== Release ==
The film premiered in Brazil on September 7, 2017. It was later shown at various international animation festivals and gained attention for its technical quality.

== Reception ==
The film received mixed reviews. While praised for its animation quality and voice acting, critics noted that the story was more appealing to children than to adults.

== International distribution ==
Lino secured distribution in over 50 countries through a deal closed at the American Film Market. The film was released theatrically in Mexico (450 screens), Canada (50 screens), and other territories across Latin America and Europe.
