= Metturo =

Brazilian-Mexican actor (born 1998)

- Metturo at the Prêmio Multishow 2025
- Born: Mateo Metturo de Oliveira Gomes Silva; 17 April 1998 (age 28); Garanhuns, Pernambuco, Brazil
- Occupations: Actor, singer, digital influencer
- Years active: 2010–present
- Height: 1.75 m (5 ft 9 in)
- Parent(s): Vhall Gomez (mother), Genni Moura (father)
- Relatives: Erick Barreto (cousin)

Signature
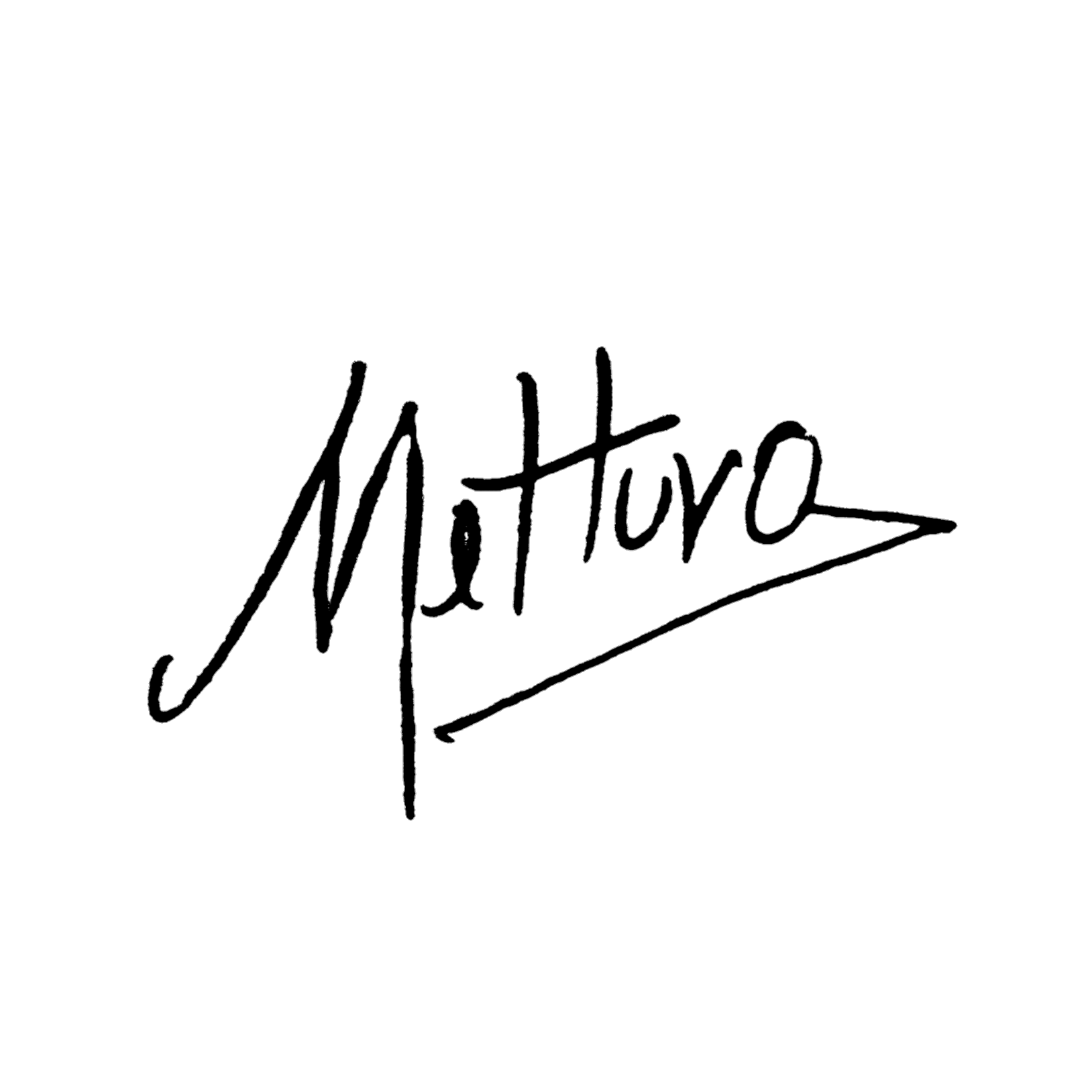

Mateo Metturo de Oliveira Gomes Silva (born 17 April 1998), known professionally as Metturo, is a Brazilian-Mexican actor, singer, and digital influencer. He gained national recognition for his roles in the SBT telenovelas Corações Feridos and Carrossel, and appeared in films such as Internet – O Filme, Divino Amor and the Argentine drama Un Rubio. He was named one of the most prominent influencers in northeastern Brazil in 2022 and 2023.

== Biography ==
=== Early life and education ===
Metturo was born in Garanhuns, Pernambuco, on 17 April 1998, to Vhall Gomez and Genni Moura. His stage name Metturo comes from his middle name, given by his mother, and carries the meaning of meteoro (Portuguese for "meteor"). He began acting at the age of six in local theater at Teatro Luiz Solto Dourado.

He is the cousin of Brazilian actor Erick Barreto.

=== Career ===
Metturo made his television debut in the soap opera Corações Feridos (2010–2012), broadcast on SBT, where he played the character Théo. He later appeared as a stunt double in the telenovela Carrossel (2012–2013), portraying a secondary version of the character Jorge Cavalieri.

He debuted in cinema with a small voice role in the animated film Lino: An Adventure of Seven Lives (2017), and that same year played Matteo in Internet – O Filme. In 2019, he portrayed Tony Priest in the Brazilian film Divino Amor and played Arturo in the Argentine drama Un Rubio. In 2021, he starred as Gabriel in Doce Encanto.

Outside of acting, he has worked as a singer and composer since 2017 and gained significant online following. In 2022 and 2023, he was ranked as the top male influencer from Garanhuns, according to a regional poll conducted by TV Asa Branca (Globo affiliate).

He is frequently featured in national media for his social media presence and personal life.

=== Personal life ===
Metturo publicly came out as bisexual in August 2024 and confirmed his relationship with actor and entrepreneur Vinicius Henuns.

== Filmography ==
=== Television ===
- Corações Feridos (2010–2012) – Théo (SBT)
- Carrossel (2012–2013) – Jorge Cavalieri No. 2 (SBT)

=== Film ===
- Lino: An Adventure of Seven Lives (2017) – Extra voice role
- Internet – O Filme (2017) – Matteo
- Divino Amor (2019) – Tony Priest
- Un Rubio (2019) – Arturo
- Doce Encanto (2021) – Gabriel
