= The Blonde One =

- Theatrical film poster
- Spanish: Un rubio
- Directed by: Marco Berger
- Written by: Marco Berger
- Produced by: Mariana Genescá
- Starring: Alfonso Barón; Gaston Re
- Cinematography: Nahuel Berger
- Release date: July 11, 2019 (ARG)
- Running time: 108 minutes
- Country: Argentina
- Language: Spanish

The Blonde One (Spanish: Un rubio) is a 2019 Argentine romantic drama film directed and written by Marco Berger. The film tells the story of a man who, after meeting his new roommate, discovers he is attracted to other men.

The film premiered at the Mardi Gras Film Festival in Sydney in February 2019. It was first shown in Argentina on July 11, 2019, as a one-time screening.

== Plot ==
After his brother moves out, Juan (Alfonso Barón) starts looking for a new roommate to help pay the rent. Gabriel (Gaston Re), a co-worker, agrees to move in with him.

Juan has a girlfriend with whom he frequently argues, and he spends his free time drinking and watching football matches with work friends. As days go by, he finds himself drawn to Gabriel, who seems to reciprocate the interest.

Although Juan is shy at first, the two eventually become lovers, keeping their relationship secret.

== Cast ==
- Alfonso Barón as Juan
- Gastón Re as Gabriel
- Ailín Salas as Julia
- Malena Irusta as Ornella
- Franco Heiler as El Mono
- Metturo as Arturo
- Fred Raposo as El Mono’s brother
- Charly Velasco as Leandro
- Antonia De Michelis as Gabriel’s mother
- Justo Calabria as Brian
- Melissa Falter as Natalia
- Fabio Zurita as Mario
- Julieta Tramanzoli as Juan’s friend
- Guido Losantos as Diego
- Luis Roberto Re as Gabriel’s father
- Daniela Castillo Mejía as Leandro’s girlfriend
- Ishbel Bautista
- Eduardo Mendábal
