= University of Araraquara =

Private university in São Paulo state, Brazil

- Universidade de Araraquara
- Other name: UNIARA
- Type: Private university
- Established: 15 July 2016; 10 years ago
- Students: 7,000
- Location: Araraquara, São Paulo, Brazil; 22°47′50″S 48°10′41″W
- Website: www.uniara.com.br/home/

The University of Araraquara (UNIARA), is a private, non-profit, co-educational university located in the city of Araraquara in the state of São Paulo, Brazil.

== History ==
The creation of the Associação São Bento de Ensino (ASBE) in 1968 set the stage to transform higher education in Araraquara and its region. That year, the Ministry of Education (MEC) approved the creation of a Faculty of Economic and Administrative Sciences. In 1970, a Faculty of Law was authorized and, in 1971, the Faculty of Education (which in 1974 would become the Faculty of Education and Social Studies). Faced with this expansion, the Federation of Isolated Colleges of Araraquara (Fefiara) was founded in 1972, to begin to bring together the existing faculties. In 1997, the Federation achieved accreditation as a University Centre. In 2016, the Araraquara University Centre was transformed into the University of Araraquara by ministerial order no. 612, dated 07/15/2016. Teaching is now carried out at several locations within the city.

== Subjects ==
As of 2024, UNIARA had more than seven thousand undergraduate students studying for bachelor's and master's degrees and doctorates. Admission is selective, based on entrance examinations conducted by the university. Subjects offered in 2024 were:

- Administration
- Architecture and urbanism
- Biology
- Biomedicine
- Cloud computing
- Fashion design
- Digital Design
- Law
- Economy
- Physical education
- Nursing
- Agronomic Engineering
- Civil Engineering
- Computer engineering
- Production engineering
- Electrical engineering
- Aesthetics and Cosmetics
- Pharmacy
- Physiotherapy
- Medicine
- Veterinary Medicine
- Nutrition
- Dentistry
- Pedagogy
- Psychology
- Advertising and marketing
- Information security
- Information systems

== Notable alumni ==
- Thainara Faria, state deputy in the Legislative Assembly of São Paulo
- Veggari, Brazilian actress, singer, talent manager and law graduate (University of Araraquara)
