= Veggari =

Brazilian actress, singer, and lawyer

- Born: Vivian Veggari Nunes; August 21, 1996 (age 29); Taquaritinga, São Paulo, Brazil
- Education: University of Araraquara (Law)
- Occupations: Actress, singer, talent manager, lawyer
- Years active: 2013–present
- Known for: Chiquititas (2013 Brazilian TV series)
- Height: 1.64 m (5 ft 4 in)
- Parent(s): Therezinha Almeida (mother) and Sergio Nunes (father)

Vivian Veggari Nunes (born 21 August 1996), professionally known as Veggari, is a Brazilian actress, singer, talent manager, and lawyer. She is known for her role as Nicole in the Brazilian television series Chiquititas (2013 Brazilian TV series) (2013–2015).

== Biography ==
=== Early life and education ===
Vivian Veggari Nunes was born in Taquaritinga, São Paulo, Brazil, to Therezinha Almeida and Sergio Nunes.

She began performing at the age of eight at the Cine Teatro São Pedro, appearing in productions such as Romeo and Juliet, Os Saltimbancos, and Little Red Riding Hood. She later studied law at the University of Araraquara, qualifying as a lawyer while continuing her artistic work.

=== Career ===
Veggari made her television debut in the Brazilian remake of Chiquititas (2013 Brazilian TV series) (2013–2015), aired on SBT, portraying the character Nicole. She appeared in films such as Abzurdah (2015), directed by Daniela Goggi, Berenice Procura (2017), directed by Allan Fiterman, and Divino Amor (2019), directed by Gabriel Mascaro, alongside Dira Paes and Júlio Machado.

In music, Veggari collaborated with former child actor Metturo on the funk single "Sequência Bota Bota" and released another single in 2026. She also contributed to the debut album of musician Dougllas Fernanddo.

During 2025, she expanded her activities in digital and live performance: she shared advice for aspiring artists on TikTok and other social media platforms, made her stage debut in Rio de Janeiro with a show emphasizing female empowerment, and participated in arts and social projects in Mozambique.

=== Personal life ===
Veggari has publicly discussed experiencing eating disorders during adolescence, including anorexia and bulimia. She has stated that these experiences influenced her artistic work.

== Filmography ==
=== Television ===
- Chiquititas (2013 Brazilian TV series) (2013–2015) – Nicole (SBT)

=== Film ===
- Abzurdah (2015) – Camila
- Berenice Procura (2017) – Verônica
- Divino Amor (2019) – Lorena
