= Home of the Brave (1985 film) =

- Directed by: Helena Solberg
- Written by: David Meyer
- Produced by: Helena Solberg
- Distributed by: PBS Video; Radiante Filmes
- Release date: October 15, 1985 (U.S.)
- Country: United States
- Languages: English; Spanish

Home of the Brave is a 1985 American documentary directed by Helena Solberg. The film was financed by the Corporation for Public Broadcasting.

== Synopsis ==
Native Americans talk about the contemporary threats they face in modern times.

== Cast ==
- Ilka Tanya Payán, narrator
