= Thainara Faria =

Brazilian politician and lawyer (born 1994)

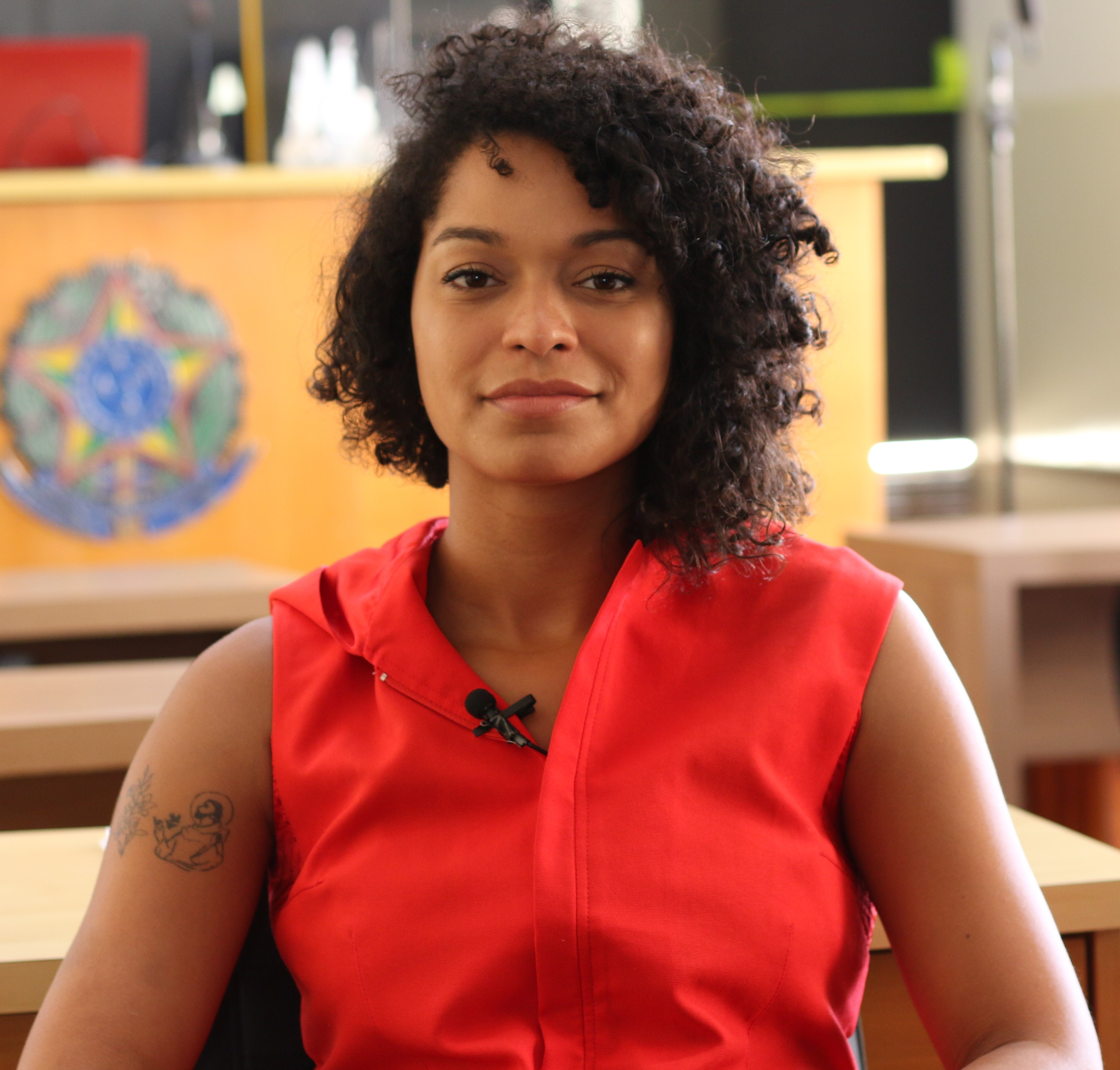

State deputy in the Legislative Assembly of São Paulo (Alesp)
- Incumbent
- Assumed office 2022
- President: Lula da Silva

Personal details
- Born: Thainara Karoline Faria; 7 December 1994 (age 31) Araraquara, São Paulo, Brazil
- Party: Workers' Party (PT)
- Education: University of Araraquara (UNIARA)

Thainara Karoline Faria (born 1994), better known as Thainara Faria, is an Afro-Brazilian lawyer and politician, who is a member of the Workers' Party (PT). In 2022, she was elected as a state deputy in the Legislative Assembly of São Paulo state.

== Early life and education ==
Faria was born on 7 December 1994 into a humble family in Araraquara in São Paulo state. Her mother worked for the local municipality and her father was a bricklayer. They later separated. In her childhood she lived in several neighbourhoods in Araraquara. To help her mother she began working at the age of seven, doing informal jobs such as a cleaner, waitress, clothing seller, and street vendor. At the age of 15 she stayed with her uncle in São Paulo in order to take a theatre course because she wanted to be a model and actress, but decided that it was too difficult for black people to get work in these areas.

Faria joined the Workers' Party (PT) in part because she attributed her success to government programmes introduced by the PT under the first government of Lula da Silva. Her family was a beneficiary of the Bolsa Família (Family allowance), a social welfare programme, and her mother obtained a house through the Minha Casa Minha Vida (My house, my life) public housing programme. Faria graduated in law at the private University of Araraquara (UNIARA), which she was only able to attend with finance from the Programa Universidade para Todos (University for All Programme - ProUni), a project of the federal government that offers support to poor people to attend private universities. She is a qualified lawyer, a member of the Order of Attorneys of Brazil, and has also studied constitutional law and economics.

== Political career ==
Faria was elected to the position of councillor in the municipality of Araraquara in 2016. The first black woman to occupy a seat in the Araraquara city council, she rapidly gained visibility beyond the city by questioning the practice of reading the Bible at council sessions. Although a Christian, she argued that it would be more appropriate to read the Brazilian Constitution. She was re-elected in 2020 when she received the most votes of any candidate. Before that election she had announced that she was bisexual. While a councillor, she was a member of the Justice, Legislation and Writing Committee of the council and the leader of the PT group in the council. In 2022, she was elected to the Legislative Assembly of São Paulo (Alesp). Her platform stressed the need to combat racism, promote human rights, particularly those of children and adolescents, combat violence against women, combat LGBT phobia, and develop the smaller municipalities in the state.

== Experience of racism ==
Several times in her political career Faria has reported being the victim of racism, both in Araraquara and the state assembly. As a young, black, female politician in the assembly she has often been mistaken for a political advisor or researcher, rather than a state deputy and suffered discrimination from employees of the assembly. This led to the development of a booklet by Alesp for its employees with guidelines against racial, gender and sexual orientation discrimination. She is presently the youngest deputy in the state assembly. The president of Alesp in 2022, André do Prado, who is a member of the far-right Liberal Party was quoted as saying that he would need considerable patience to deal with all the women and black people in the assembly. She also suffered from death threats as well as negative comments on social media.

== Awards and honours ==
Faria was made an honorary citizen of the city of São Carlos in São Paulo state in February 2024.
