= Patrícia Melo =

Brazilian writer

- Born: 1962 (age 63–64); São Paulo, Brazil
- Occupations: Writer and author

Patrícia Melo (born 1962 in São Paulo) is a Brazilian author. She has written The Killer and In Praise of Lies, among others. Her works have dealt with sex and violence in a heavily urbanized setting.

She made her literary debut in 1994 with Acqua Toffana, and in 2001 she won the Jabuti Prize for Literature for her novel Inferno, as well as several international awards. In 1999, she was included by Time magazine among the five best Latin American authors of the new millennium. Her works have been sold to England, France, the United States, Germany, Italy, Spain and China, among other countries.

== Books published ==
Year	Title	Publisher
1994	Acqua Toffana	Companhia das Letras/Rocco
1995	The Killer -O Matador	Companhia das Letras/Companhia de Bolso/Rocco
1998	In Praise of Lies -Elogio da Mentira	Companhia das Letras/Rocco
2000	Inferno	Companhia das Letras/Rocco
2003	Valsa Negra	Companhia das Letras/Rocco
2006	Mundo Perdido	Companhia das Letras/Rocco
2008	Jonas, o Copromanta	Companhia das Letras/Rocco
2010	Ladrão de Cadáveres	Rocco
2011	Escrevendo no escuro	Rocco
2014	Fogo-fátuo	Rocco

== Filmography ==
- Traição (1998) - screenwriter of the segment "Cachorro!"
- Bufo & Spallanzani (2001) - screenwriter
- O Xangô de Baker Street (2001) - screenwriter
- O Homem do Ano (2003) - based on her bookO Matador
