= Ben Linder =

American engineer killed by the Contras (1959–1987)

- Linder with Nicaraguan children
- Born: July 7, 1959; California, United States
- Died: April 28, 1987 (aged 27); El Cuá, Jinotega Department, Nicaragua
- Cause of death: Gunshot wounds
- Occupation: Engineer
- Known for: Electrification work in rural Nicaragua, murdered while working on a hydroelectric facility near El Cuá

Benjamin Ernest Linder (July 7, 1959 – April 28, 1987), was an American engineer. He was killed by the Contras while working on a small hydroelectric dam in rural northern Nicaragua.

== Biography ==
=== Early life ===
Benjamin Linder was born 7 July 1959 in San Francisco, California. He and his siblings, John and Miriam, were raised in a secular Jewish family. His mother, Elisabeth (née Koralek), was born in Czechoslovakia. She and her family fled ahead of the Nazi invasion in the late 1930s. She later settled in California. His father, Dr. David Linder, was a WWII veteran and a physician. They met in 1953 at the hospital where he was a resident and she worked as a secretary.

The family moved to Portland, Oregon in 1970. Ben Linder graduated from Adams High School in 1977. The same year, he was arrested while participating in a sit-in demonstration as part of the protests against the Trojan Nuclear Power Plant. While in studying at the University of Washington in Seattle, Linder helped to organize a student activist committee in opposition to US foreign policy towards El Salvador. Linder also enjoyed juggling and was often seen around Seattle riding a 5-to-6-foot-tall (1.5 to 1.8 m) unicycle. He graduated in 1983, with a degree in mechanical engineering; at his graduation ceremony he rode his unicycle across the stage to accept his diploma. He left his Oregon home that summer and moved to Managua, the capital of Nicaragua

=== Career ===
Linder felt inspired by the 1979 Sandinista revolution, and wanted to support its efforts to improve the lives of the country's poorest people. The Reagan administration, however, was determined to cripple the revolution. Beginning in 1981, the Central Intelligence Agency secretly trained, armed and supplied thousands of Contra rebels. A major element of the Contras' strategy was to launch attacks on government cooperatives, health clinics and power stations—the things that most exemplified the improvements that had been brought about by the revolution.

In 1986, Linder moved from Managua to El Cuá, a village in the Nicaraguan war zone, where he helped form a team to build a hydroelectric plant to bring electricity to the town. While living in El Cuá, he participated in vaccination campaigns, using his talents as a clown, juggler, and unicyclist to entertain the local children, for whom he expressed great affection and concern.

=== Death ===
Linder and two of his colleagues, Pablo Rosales and Sergio Hernández, were ambushed and killed by the Contras, a loose confederation of rebel groups funded by the U.S. government.

The autopsy report stated that Linder had gunshot wounds to the back of the legs (indicating he had his back to the killers), while on the ground he suffered multiple wounds to his face (the coroner noted as from an ice pick) and died from a close range gunshot to the head. The other two men were also murdered in the same way. It is unknown if they were similarly tortured first. There was no mention in Linder's autopsy report of grenade fragments.

Coming at a time when U.S. support for the Contras was already highly controversial, Linder's death made front-page headlines around the world and further polarized opinion in the United States.

On April 28, 1987, Linder and two Nicaraguans Sergio Hernández and Pablo Rosales were killed in a Contra ambush while traveling through the forest to scout out a construction site for a new dam for the nearby village of San José de Bocay. The autopsy showed that Linder had been wounded by a grenade, then shot at point-blank range in the head. Hernández and Rosales were also killed at close range.

== Impact on American politics ==
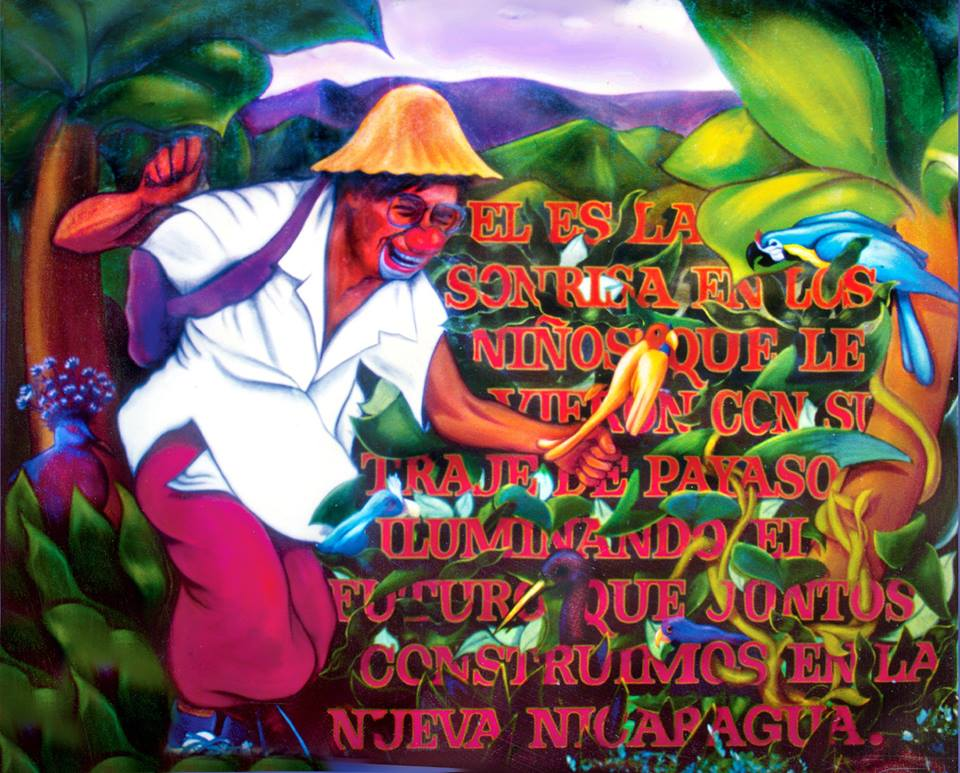
Mural dedicated to Ben Linder in Esteli, Nicaragua painted by American artist Mike Alewitz 1989.

Linder's death quickly inflamed the already-polarized debate inside the United States, with opponents of U.S. policy decrying the use of taxpayers' dollars to finance the killing of an American citizen as well as thousands of Nicaraguan civilians. The Reagan administration fought back, with White House spokesman Marlin Fitzwater saying that U.S. citizens working in Nicaragua had "put themselves in harm's way". Assistant Secretary of State Elliott Abrams, an ardent proponent of the Contra War, echoed that view, saying that Linder should have known better than to be in a combat zone.

Linder's mother Elisabeth, in Nicaragua for her son's funeral, said,

My son was brutally murdered for bringing electricity to a few poor people in northern Nicaragua. He was murdered because he had a dream and because he had the courage to make that dream come true. ... Ben told me the first year that he was here, and this is a quote, "It's a wonderful feeling to work in a country where the government's first concern is for its people, for all of its people."

During a Congressional hearing in May 1987, some defenders of U.S. policy in Nicaragua responded, launching attacks on Linder's family and other witnesses. The Village Voice reported one exchange between Republican Congressman Connie Mack of Florida and Elisabeth Linder, who had just given emotional testimony about her son's work and motivations. Mack accused Mrs. Linder of using her grief "to politicize this situation", adding, "I don't want to be tough on you, but I really feel you have asked for it." Linder's death came as Congressional hearings investigated the Iran-Contra Affair, which fueled the debate in the U.S. over the covert war in Nicaragua. The next year, Congress refused to renew aid to the Contras.

In July 1996, American journalist Paul Berman published an article in The New Yorker featuring an interview with a man who claimed to have killed Linder. Linder's parents and their lawyers publicly denounced the article and disputed the veracity of the man Berman interviewed.

== Recognition ==
The song "Fragile" on Sting's 1987 album, ...Nothing Like the Sun, is a tribute to Ben Linder.

In 1989, American artist Mike Alewitz painted a mural in Linder's memory. The 10'x15' mural was painted in Esteli, Nicaragua. It depicts Linder in a clown suit. The text states: "El es la sonrisa en los niños que le ven con su traje de payaso iluminando el futuro que juntos construimos en la nueva Nicaragua."["He is the smile in the children who see him in his clown suit, illuminating the future that together we are building in the new Nicaragua."]

Singer-songwriter Dean Stevens wrote and recorded "The Children Knew Ben" on his 1989 CD, Seeds, for Volcano Records.

The 1990 book Animal Dreams by Barbara Kingsolver is also dedicated to his memory, as was the (now closed) Ben Linder Cafe in Leon, Nicaragua, which was adorned with his photo and memories of his life's work.

In 2001 journalist Joan Kruckewitt, who lived in Nicaragua from 1983 to 1991 and covered the war between the Sandinistas and the Contras for ABC Radio, wrote a book entitled The Death of Ben Linder, giving a sympathetic portrait of Linder's life, work, and death.

Portland State University created a scholarship in Linder's honor in 2002.

Attendees at the Portland Juggling Festival vote to award the "most inspirational juggler" at the event their annual Ben Linder Memorial Award.

== See also ==
- Witness for Peace
- Bill Stewart, an ABC reporter killed along with his interpreter in Managua in 1979.
- Brian Willson, an American injured by a naval munitions train while protesting US arms shipments to Central America.
