= Divine Love (film) =

2019 Brazilian drama film

- Film poster
- Directed by: Gabriel Mascaro
- Written by: Gabriel Mascaro
- Starring: Dira Paes
- Release date: 25 January 2019 (Sundance)
- Running time: 101 minutes
- Country: Brazil
- Language: Portuguese

Divine Love (Portuguese: Divino Amor) is a 2019 Brazilian drama film directed by Gabriel Mascaro. It was screened in the World Cinema Dramatic Competition section at the 2019 Sundance Film Festival. It tells the story of a deeply religious registry office clerk who uses her position at the births, deaths and marriages department to try to dissuade couples from getting a divorce. Joana (Dira Paes) does everything in the name of the sanctity of marriage and the Christian family. As she waits for a sign of recognition for all her efforts, a marital crisis of her own brings her even closer to God.

== Cast ==
- Dira Paes as Joana
- Julio Machado as Danilo
- Teca Pereira as Mestra Dalva
- Metturo as Tony Priest at baptism
- Veggari as Lorena

== Release and reception ==
The film premiered at the Sundance and Berlin Film Festivals in 2019. The Hollywood Reporter, which considered Divine Love one of the best features at Sundance that year, called it "a very of-the-moment parable", while Variety described the film as "spiritual and sexy". IndieWire saw it as an "exuberant sociopolitical statement". The French magazine Le Polyster found the film "daring, surprising, intelligent, thrilling and, yes, absolutely divine". On Metacritic, Divine Love scored 86/100.
