= North American Congress on Latin America =

Non-profit organization

- Abbreviation: NACLA
- Formation: 1966
- Type: non-profit organization; publisher
- Headquarters: 53 Washington Square, South Fl. 4W
- Location: New York City
- Sponsor: NYU Center for Latin American and Caribbean Studies (CLACS)
- Website: nacla.org

North American Congress in Latin America (NACLA) is a non-profit organization founded in 1966 to provide information on trends in Latin America and relations between Latin America and the United States. The organization is best known for publishing the quarterly NACLA Report on the Americas, and also publishes "books, anthologies and pamphlets for classroom and activist use". The NACLA Report on the Americas print magazine was briefly discontinued in 2015, but relaunched under the Taylor and Francis imprint Routledge in May 2016.

For the last 50 years, NACLA has been a source of English-language news and analysis for journalists, policymakers, activists, students and scholars in North America and throughout the world.

== History ==
=== Founding ===
"[T]he focus of our attention and hope was the Cuban Revolution. The readers and writers of the NACLA Newsletter tended to view the future of Latin America and the Caribbean as resting on the possibility of reproducing something like the Cuban model elsewhere in the region."

— Judith Adler Hellman, former NACLA member

In 1966, the founders consisted of civil rights, anti-war, and labor activists. The North American Congress on Latin America (NACLA) was established as a group that performed research for the group Students for a Democratic Society. The group's founders were inspired by the Cuban Revolution and had a goal to challenge the elitist conventions expressed as "national interests" of the American people and to express the interests of those fundamentally opposed to American elitism.

=== 1970s–1990s ===
The 1970s produced further research on United States (U.S.) involvement in the 1973 overthrow of Salvador Allende's elected government in Chile. The coup reinforced the American "fears" of socialism succeeding in America. That year, the NACLA report called "Facing the Blockade" documented President Richard Nixon's Administration's "invisible blockade" that denied Allende and his regime's "credit arrangements necessary for export-import operations". Salvador Allende responded to NACLA's book New Chile in his speech to the United Nations by saying: "If you want to know how the U.S. has affected Chile, just read New Chile by NACLA."

In 1978, NACLA split into two groups, with one group moving to Oakland, California, called the "Data Center".

In the 1980s, NACLA's reporting focused on the United States' role in the Central American Wars of the 1980s. NACLA activists travelled frequently to El Salvador, Nicaragua, and Guatemala, studying conflicts in such areas.

In the 1990s, NACLA stated that there was a pervasive culture of impunity in Latin America's new democracies. They highlighted the military consequences of the Drug War and criticized the neoliberal revolution occurring in Latin America.

Rubén Zamora, a presidential candidate Democratic Convergence in El Salvador, said that he regards NACLA as responsible for the better part of his political formation. During the darkest part of Haiti's military rule in the early 1990s, President Jean-Bertrand Aristide's ambassador-in-exile to the United States, Jean Casimir, wrote to “express [his] gratitude to NACLA for its unflinching solidarity during this important period of our history."

=== Present ===
Today, with Latin American leaders and social movements confronting what they call inequalities brought on by neoliberalism and rejecting the Washington Consensus, the growing movement for global justice pushes NACLA's intentions to take a prominent role just as it did in the 1970s and 1980s. Using the internet as an organizing tool and information portal, NACLA's website intends to provide coverage of Latin America and the Caribbean along with an analysis magazine, 50 years of archives, discussion forums, electronic newsletters, action alerts, links to social movements and organizations, and a media analysis project to examine mainstream coverage of the region.

In 2006, the NACLA Report was rewarded with the Utne Independent Press Award for International Coverage.

Since 2013, NACLA has partnered with the New York University Center for Latin American and Caribbean Studies, in the King Juan Carlos of Spain building, which houses NACLA's offices.

After a brief pause in 2015, the NACLA Report on the Americas resumed publication in May 2016 as a quarterly publication published under the Taylor and Francis imprint Routledge. Content is managed by a small editorial staff and editorial board of academics, activists, journalists, and researchers.

== Programs and activities ==
NACLA developed programs involving public debate and activism surrounding issues in the Americas. This includes its flagship publication, NACLA Report of the Americas, among other books, anthologies, and pamphlets. To support its bi-monthly newsletter, NACLA's site includes blogs, interviews, photo essays, its own radio department, and articles for investigative research and journalism.

NACLA hosts and collaborates with various conferences, seminars, teach-ins, and workshops to bring journalists, students, scholars, and others together such as The Media Accuracy on Latin America project, which involved a network of participants that generate constructive media criticism on U.S. policy in the region.

== Magazine ==
NACLA Report on the Americas is the political magazine produced by the North American Congress on Latin America.

The journal describes itself as "the oldest and most widely read progressive magazine covering Latin America and its relationship with the United States".

The magazine changed from bimonthly to quarterly in 2012. It ceased print publication in 2015. However, the magazine announced a return to print through a partnership with Routledge in April 2016. The relaunch of the magazine was set for May 27, 2016.

=== Format ===
A standard issue began with several short pieces on Latin American and Caribbean current events followed by a series of longer in-depth articles grouped in a thematic section on a particular topic of Latin American affairs and/or U.S. policy toward the region. Each issue ended with a review section on books related to Latin American and Caribbean political themes.
