= Ludmila Dayer =

Brazilian-American actress

- Born: Ludmila Dayer Schuller; 18 June 1983 (age 42); Rio de Janeiro, Brazil
- Citizenship: American and Brazilian
- Occupation(s): Actress, director and producer
- Years active: 1995–present

Ludmila Dayer-Middleton (born 18 June 1983) is a Brazilian-American actress, director and producer.

== Career ==
Dayer began acting at the age of 10 in the movie Carlota Joaquina – Princesa do Brasil released in 1995, for which she was named by the Associação Paulista de Críticos de Arte (APCA) as the revelation of the year. She rose to prominence after being discovered in a Spanish dance class and getting cast for a double role in two different languages in Carlota Joaquina: the Spanish infant princess Carlota and the little British girl Yolanda. At that time, she didn't speak English and Spanish fluently; but after two months of training with a language coach, she could deliver her lines in both languages.

For her next film "Traição" where she plays the "Diabólica" character by playwright Nelson Rodrigues, she got the "Candango" for best supporting actress at the Festival de Brasília.

The first part she landed as a teenager was a TV role in the Rede Manchete telenovela, Xica da Silva. In 2000, she moved to Brazil's biggest network, Rede Globo, to play the lead female in the teen soap Malhação. Dayer then rose to national fame through her role in the 2004 soap Senhora do Destino, where she portrayed Danielle Meira, nicknamed "baby nymph" by her boyfriend Giovanni Improtta (José Wilker). That same year, she was the lead in the movie Vida de Menina, based on the diaries of Helena Morley. She was nominated for best actress at the Festival de Gramado and Recife Cinema Festival "Cine PE" taking home the award for best actress.

In 2006, Dayer moved to Los Angeles where she founded Lupi Productions, a creative production company.

In 2022 made her directorial debut with the documentary "EU" (ME). The film tackles her personal experience with mental health issues and her journey of self-discovery. In addition to directing and producing, Dayer took on responsibilities such as writing, cinematography and editing. The documentary premiered on Aquarius, a Brazilian streaming platform where she serves as one of the partners.

== Personal life ==
Dayer was born in Rio de Janeiro, Brazil. She holds both the Brazilian and US citizenships. In 2016, she married a British businessman. The couple currently lives in Los Angeles, California.

== Filmography ==
=== Television ===
Year	Title	Role	Notes
1995	Malhação	Taty	Season 1; Episodes: "July 11–12, 1995"
1996	Xica da Silva	Isabel Gonçalo	
1998	Corpo Dourado	Bianca Nunes (Bibi)	
1999	Mulher	Mariana	Episode: "Herança de Família"
2000	Malhação	Joana Carneiro	Season 7
2002	Sítio do Picapau Amarelo	Juliana	Episode: "Histórias Diversas"
2002	Linha Direta	Aída Curi	Episode: "Aída Curi"
2004	Senhora do Destino	Danielle Meira	
2005	Os Ricos Também Choram	Sofia Trindade	
2009	Rollers	Sofia Trindade	
2010	Polomino	Stripper boss	
2013	Louco por Elas	Cibele	Episode: "Léo e Giovana não Lembram"; Episode: "Amados amantes!"

=== Film ===
Year	Title	Role	Notes
1995	Carlota Joaquina – Princesa do Brasil	Yolanda / Carlota (young)	
1997	A Inquebrável		
1998	Traição	Alice	
2002	As Vozes da Verdade	Gabriela	
2004	Vida de Menina	Helena Morley	
2008	A Guerra dos Rocha	Paola	
2009	O Mundo de Lud	Lud	
2013	Parents	The Mother	
2023	EU (ME, journey within)	Director, Writer, Producer	-
