= Murals of revolutionary Nicaragua =

Good To Read

In the decade of Sandinista rule following the triumph of the Nicaraguan Revolution in 1979, close to 300 murals were created in that country. These murals provided a narrative of the revolution, portraying recent and more distant history, and visualizing the better future promised by the revolution.

The first murals expressing solidarity with the Sandinistas were painted outside the country in Panama, by brothers Virgilio and Ignacio Ortega. They entered Nicaragua after the Sandinista takeover and continued their work there, and many other artists also took part over the following years. Despite the laws passed by the Sandinista government to protect the murals, most of them have since been destroyed.

== Historical context ==
In the 1920s an anti-imperialist movement was founded by Augusto Sandino to break U.S. dominance in Nicaragua. His guerrilla army won a short-lived victory for socialist policies. Following his assassination in 1934, Nicaragua experienced forty years of repression and violence under the dictatorship of Anastasio Somoza, which had U.S. support. Somoza was overthrown in 1979 by the Sandinista National Liberation Front (FSLN). Daniel Ortega, the revolution's clan leader, enacted a series of major literacy, healthcare, and land reforms. In the context of the Cold War and anti-communist movements in the U.S., Nicaragua's attempts to redistribute land and wealth unleashed a hostile response from the U.S., which financed and armed the Contras, a counter-revolutionary force.

The mural movement was a response to the original movement of Sandino and the revolution that was inspired by him nearly 50 years later. The murals both offer a realistic portrayal of what happened in the Sandinista-Contra War and reflect the socialistic and optimistic values of the FSLN government. It was in the 1990s, when the Sandinista government was voted out of office and replaced by a U.S. supported rightist government, that the murals began to be destroyed.

== The Felicia Santizo Brigade of Panama ==
In the 1970s, brothers Virgilio and Ignacio Ortega formed the Felicia Santizo Brigade of Panama. Inspired by the Ramona Parra Brigades in Chile they began to paint murals all over Panama. Choosing locations on and around army bases, their murals centered on themes of nationalism, Marxism, anti-imperialism, pro-Palestinian and pro-Sandinista view points.

The Felicia Santizo Brigade of Panama marks the story of the first muralist expression of solidarity with Nicaragua from the outside in the struggle against Somoza. Historically, theirs were the first revolutionary themed murals painted throughout Nicaragua. In September 1979, within two months of the triumph of the Sandinistas, arrangements were made to have the brigade paint a mural in Nicaragua. This guerrilla brigade made their entry into Nicaragua with the support of the FSLN army and, similar to their work in Panama, most of their murals were painted in army and police bases. Their work – in consultation with local sponsors and residents – was centered on military themes, focusing on the physical facts of the insurrection. For example, a mural from the Nicarao Community Center in Managua depicts an angry mob of men and women – some armed with rifles and others with knives – looking down at a prostrate National Guardsman. A dagger hovers just above his throat, and his eyes are white with horror. Other murals by the Felicia Santizo Brigade adorn long walls, crowded with gun-toting figures, reclining corpses, and portraits of revolutionary predecessors such as Lenin, Sandino, and Che Guevara.

The Panamanians were the first of many artists from abroad who came to Nicaragua in the years after the Revolution to express their solidarity with the nation's new political climate. Their murals were among the first painted within Nicaragua, and were also the first to be destroyed.

== Mural themes ==
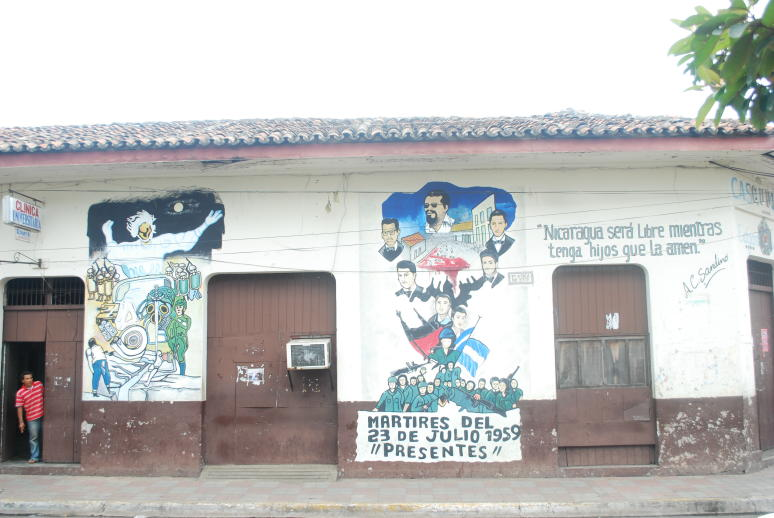
Revolutionary wall paintings in León, Nicaragua.

The murals express a wide range of themes regarding politics, the people and the undocumented history of the nation, such as:

- Insurrection:The pivotal event leading up to mural movement in Nicaragua was the Sandinista Insurrection over Somoza's government. The muralists took a different perspective than most artists previously in Nicaragua, depicting the battles against the Somoza government and preaching resistance against Somoza.
- Power to the People: Nearly every mural centered on human figures: both monumental and miniature bodies, gestures and attitudes. The murals represent the idea of ordinary people taking power into their own hands. Many of the murals depict historical events and show representatives of the masses under the flags of Nicaragua and Sandinismo. Unarmed peasants and workers merge with the military scenes of the rebels in the defiant assertion of liberation and self-governance. The ideology of these paintings, in general, is not hidden. It is obvious who is the enemy and for what purpose is his fall (that is the fall of Somocismo, the Contras, and U.S. imperialism for the sake of the people).
- A better society: Sandinista Socialist Programs: Except for a few murals that attack Somocismo and one that highlights the dangers of alcoholism, many of the murals convey positive social messages. They are looking forward to a better life, improved health, a world of play not poverty for children. The muralists paint the ideal life of a socialized society including especially figures of workers, peasants, Christians, women and youth. Many of the murals speak to the feminist agenda combating eloquently to the life, work, desires and achievements of women. Certain feminist issues, such as abortion issues, were not included in murals because they were considered too divisive for the still Catholic and traditional society. The willingness for women to bear arms, however, was included and depicted in several murals of an armed mother and child. Murals in hospitals depict Sandinista ideals of universal and free health care. A special concentration on murals that included the handicapped was also included, appropriately for a nation where tens of thousands had been maimed in the war.
- An economy producing happiness: The murals, as a whole, never show a hope for a future of industrial growth and technological advance. The murals, with a touch of romanticism, paint Nicaragua as continuing in its traditional dependence on agricultural export crops, particularly coffee and cotton. The painters' simplification of the future of Nicaragua's economy, although aesthetically pleasing and hopeful, are not congruent with the Sandinista's plans to diversify and industrialize the Nicaragua economy, making it less dependent on western markets. However, in contrast to agriculture historically, the muralists paint coffee and cotton production no longer as a source of profit for U.S. capitalists and a production for markets wherever they may be, but rather for the purpose of human happiness and the profit of the workers. The peasants painted in the murals are beneficiaries of the hoped-for Sandinista land reform; however, many argue that this depiction of happy workers may simply be socialist optimism.
- Identity of culture and revolution: Ernesto Cardenal, a poet, priest, Minister of Culture and propagator of Nicaragua revolutionary culture saw the revolution as a work of art. He saw no separation between the revolution and art. Consequently, to him and many others, the mural movement was another powerful weapon even during the aftermath of the revolution through its depiction of past injustice and of future, hopeful prosperity.
- The Sandinista Pantheon: Through the murals, the key figures of the Nicaraguan revolution and counter-revolution lived on as representatives of what the Sandinistas historically and presently stood for. With few paintings centered on actual comandantes of the military, the Sandinista pantheon consists more of Nicaraguan martyrs, revolutionary figures of other countries such as Marx, Lenin and Che, and of Sandino. These figures all work to emphasize the values present in the Revolution and the governments that followed it.

== Locations of murals ==
Throughout the mural movement, murals were painted all over Nicaragua. However, murals were unsurprisingly most concentrated in the areas in which the Nicaraguan revolution and Sandinista movements had been most intense. Following is a list of all the cities in which murals have been found and documented throughout Nicaragua and in parentheses is the number of murals that each town contains.

- Managua: Center (12)
- Managua: Suburbs (113)
- Achuapa (1)
- Asturias (2)
- Bluefields (7)
- Boaco (2)
- Chinandega (2)
- Ciudad Sandino (3)
- Corinto (2)
- Diriamba (3)
- Diriomo (1)
- Estelí (20)
- Granada (5)
- Jalapa (2)
- Jinotega (4)
- Jinotepe (2)
- Juigalpa (8)
- León (26)
- Masaya (13)
- Matalgapa (5)
- Ocotal (2)
- Pearl Lagoon (1)
- Puerto Cabezas (2)
- Rivas (4)
- San Benito (1)
- San Carlos (9)
- San Miguelito (1)
- Sébaco (2)
- Solentiname (1)
- Tipitapa (2)
- Tonalá (1)
- Wasala (9)

== Destruction of murals ==
After the 1990 Sandinista loss in the Nicaraguan elections, the mayor of Managua, Arnoldo Alemán, started a campaign to paint over and destroy the murals, even though these murals were protected by various articles of the Nicaraguan constitution and Law 90. These statutes called for the protection of Nicaraguan culture, as well as for freedom of expression and preservation of "historic patrimony." None of those responsible for the destruction were ever successfully prosecuted. Alemán continually denied his sponsorship of the destruction and elimination of the murals and promised repeatedly to compensate the different artists for their lost artwork, although few payments were in fact made. It is suspected that much of the destruction movement was sponsored by the U.S. government in their attempt to eliminate pro-Sandinista, anti-U.S. imperialism propaganda from Nicaraguan society. Many of the oldest, best and most centrally placed murals were painted over and now only exist in memory, or in some cases in photographic records. After Alemán's campaign was underway, however, a movement of artists and concerned groups began to raise funds to restore and protect these murals and were successful to some extent; new murals were painted as well under the eventual return of Daniel Ortega and the Sandinista National Liberation Front leadership in 2007.
