= Marcelo Moraes =

Brazilian politician (born 1979)

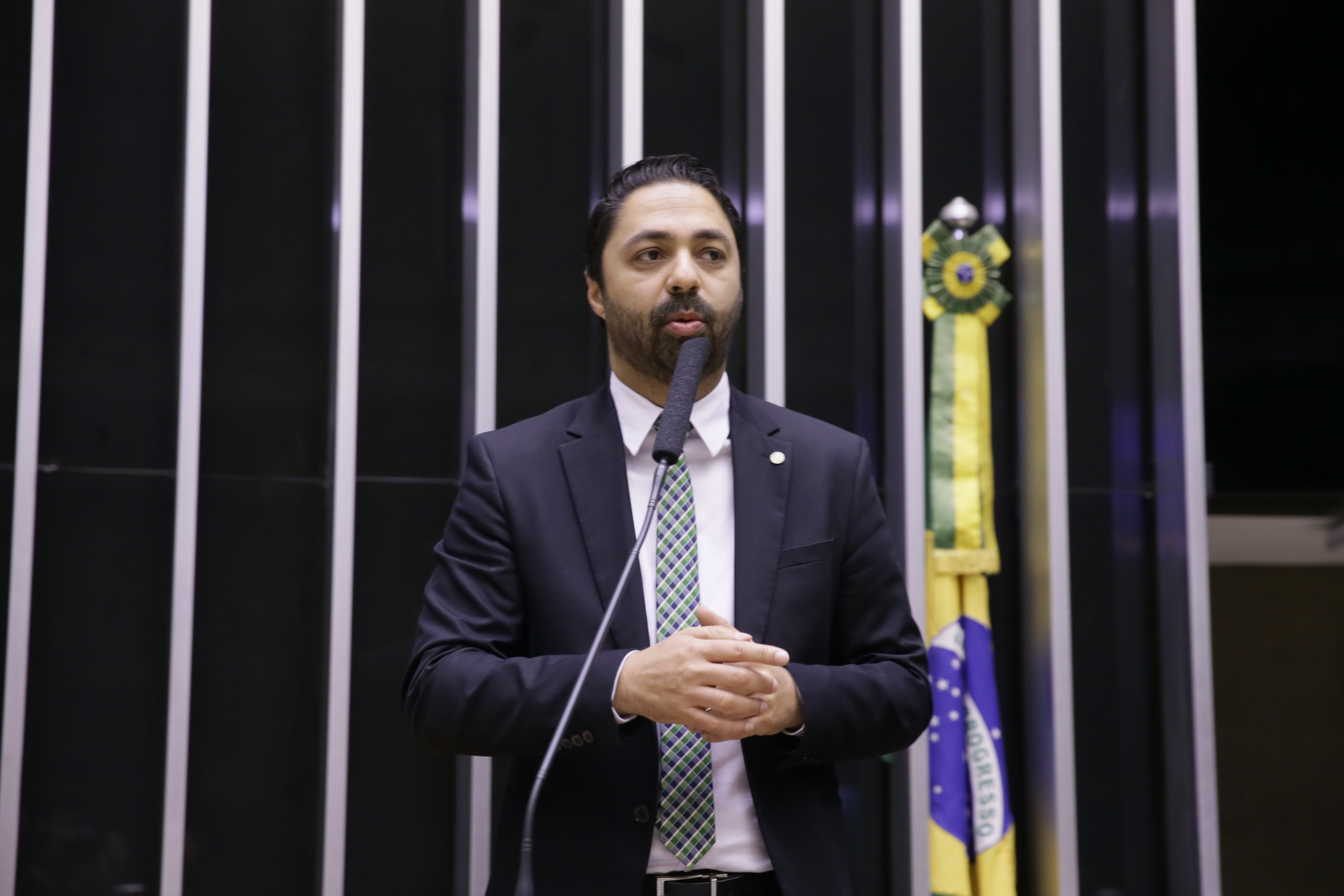
- Moraes in 2022

Member of the Chamber of Deputies
- Incumbent
- Assumed office 1 February 2019
- Constituency: Rio Grande do Sul

Personal details
- Born: 7 August 1979 (age 47)
- Party: Liberal Party (since 2022)
- Parent: Sérgio Moraes (father)

Marcelo Pires Moraes (born 7 August 1979) is a Brazilian politician serving as a member of the Chamber of Deputies since 2019. From 2011 to 2018, he was a member of the Legislative Assembly of Rio Grande do Sul. He is the son of Sérgio Moraes.
