= From the Ashes: Nicaragua Today =

- Directed by: Helena Solberg
- Written by: Saul Landau
- Produced by: Glenn Silber; Melanie Maholick
- Production companies: National Endowment for the Humanities; PBS; International Women's Film Project
- Distributed by: Radiante Filmes
- Release date: April 7, 1982
- Running time: 60 minutes
- Country: United States
- Language: English

From the Ashes: Nicaragua Today is a 1982 American documentary directed by Helena Solberg and co-produced by Glenn Silber.

== Plot ==
This documentary probes the human realities and the political complexities of life in Nicaragua following the 1979 insurrection that overthrew the dictatorship of Anastasio Somoza Debayle. Providing a personalized perspective on the country's past and present are the Chavarrías, a family of six. Their comments are accompanied by archival footage documenting the presence of U.S. Marines in Nicaragua from 1912 to 1933, the rise of rebel leader Augusto Sandino and scenes from the bloody civil war including the murder of ABC-TV newsman Bill Stewart by Somoza's National Guard. The film also explores issues such as the national literacy campaign, the changing relations between the sexes, the social activist role of the church, the agrarian reform movement, the revolution's impact on private business and the training of Nicaraguan exiles at a Florida military camp in preparation for attacks by the Contras in Nicaragua.

== Reception ==
The film was criticized for "present a one-sided, pro-Sandinist point of view." The accusations were made by the American Catholic Committee, an anti-Communist organization of lay Catholics headed by James McFadden, a former New York City Labor Commissioner. Despite the controversy, From the Ashes: Nicaragua Today won a News & Documentary Emmy Award for Background-Analysis of Current Story: Programs after airing on PBS.
