= Blood of Brothers =

1991 book by Stephen Kinzer

Blood of Brothers: Life and War in Nicaragua
- Author: Stephen Kinzer
- Publisher: Putnam Publishing Group
- Publication date: 1991
- ISBN: 0-399-13594-4

Blood of Brothers: Life and War in Nicaragua is a 1991 book by Stephen Kinzer, an American author and The New York Times foreign correspondent who reported from Nicaragua during the war between the Sandinista and the Contras during the 1980s Nicaraguan Revolution.

== Publishing information ==
- Blood of Brothers: Life and War in Nicaragua, by Stephen Kinzer, Putnam Publishing Group, 1991. ISBN 0-399-13594-4 (reprinted in 2007 by the David Rockefeller Center for Latin American Studies, Harvard University)
