= Synval Silva =

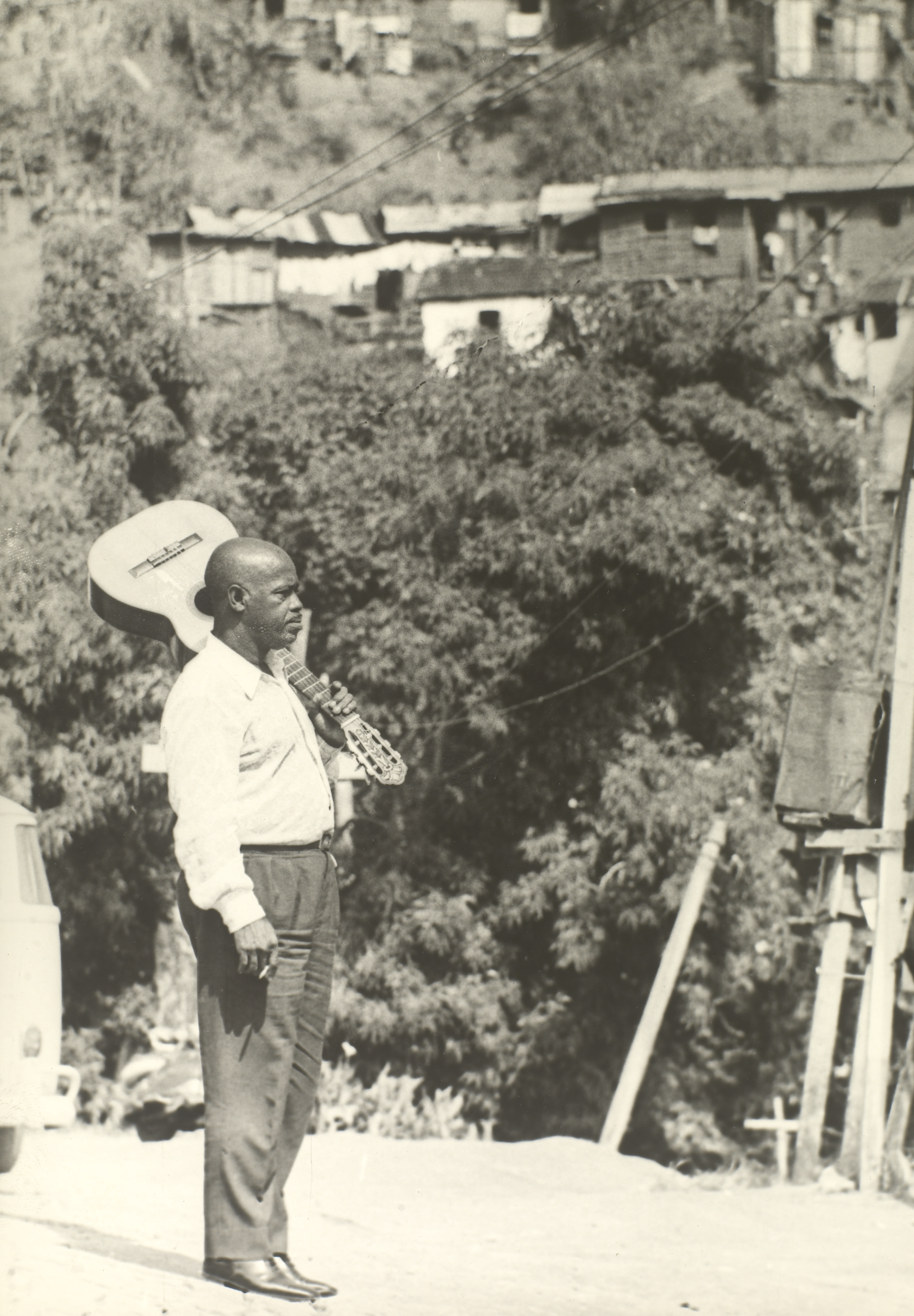

Background information
- Born: March 14, 1911; Juiz de Fora, Minas Gerais, Brazil
- Died: April 14, 1994 (aged 83) Rio de Janeiro, Brazil
- Genres: Samba
- Occupations: Songwriter, singer
- Instrument: Acoustic guitar
- Years active: 1927–1973

Synval Silva (Juiz de Fora, March 14, 1911 – Rio de Janeiro, April 14, 1994) was a singer and Brazilian composer. His main successes were recorded by Carmen Miranda.
