= The Death of Ben Linder =

1999 book by Joan Kruckewitt

The Death of Ben Linder: The Story of a North American in Sandinista Nicaragua
- Author: Joan Kruckewitt
- Cover artist: Adam Simon
- Language: English
- Publisher: Seven Stories Press
- Publication date: 1999
- Publication place: United States
- Media type: Hardcover, paperback, digital
- Pages: 400
- ISBN: 9781888363968
- OCLC: 869310030
- LC Class: F1528.22.L56k78 1999

The Death of Ben Linder: The Story of a North American in Sandinista Nicaragua is a biographical account of the life of Ben Linder, an American engineer who was murdered by Contras while working on development projects in Nicaragua during the Nicaraguan Revolution. Written by Joan Kruckewitt and published in 1999 by Seven Stories Press, it was the first published biography focused on Linder, whose death had sparked significant political controversy in the U.S. in 1987.

Kruckewitt briefly describes Linder's early life and academic career, but mostly focuses on his time in Nicaragua in the 1980s. She covers Linder's time in Managua working for the Nicaraguan Energy Institute, his work on hydroplants around El Cuá, and his death in a Contra ambush. Kruckewitt also discusses the activities of other internationalists in Nicaragua including Yvan Leyvraz, a Swiss worker killed by Contras in 1986. The book covers warfare in the area of El Cuá, including clashes between Contra and government forces and Contra raids and ambushes, and Kruckewitt also discusses the war on a larger scale.

The book received generally favorable reviews from newspapers, academic journals, and individuals and organizations involved in Nicaraguan solidarity work.

== Background ==
Kruckewitt moved to Nicaragua in 1983, reporting on the Contra War for various U.S. news outlets, primarily ABC Radio, until 1991. Linder also moved to Nicaragua in 1983, shortly after graduating from the University of Washington, in order to work on development projects. He remained in the country for most of the next several years, interrupted by a few visits to the U.S., and was murdered in 1987 while building a weir in a remote part of the countryside. During the several years they were both in Nicaragua, Kruckewitt and Linder met several times, particularly in the national capital of Managua. After Linder's death, Kruckewitt attended his funeral in Matagalpa and began gathering material for a book about his life. In 1993, Kruckewitt returned to Nicaragua focused entirely on producing a biography. With the aid of Paul Berman, she was able to interview the Contra who claimed responsibility for Linder's death. Kruckewitt conducted many other interviews with those who knew Linder, including Nicaraguans, fellow internationalists, and his family and also made extensive use of his letters and journals. Berman described his and Kruckewitt's search in a 1996 article in the New Yorker. In 1997, Kruckewitt published an excerpt from the book in the San Francisco Chronicle, describing a Contra ambush near the town of El Cuá.

== Publication ==
The Death of Ben Linder was published by Seven Stories Press, an American independent publisher. Seven Stories Press, known for titles on politics and activism, has published other titles on Nicaragua, including Dark Alliance by Gary Webb, about the involvement of the CIA and the Contras in drug trafficking. The book was distributed by Penguin Random House.

== Reception ==
Reviewing The Death of Ben Linder in The Texas Observer, UT Austin professor Milton Jamail, who visited Nicaragua in the 1980s, described it as "compelling and well-written" and felt it accurately captured the negative effects of U.S. policy in Latin America. Pierre LaRamee, reviewing the book in the NACLA Report on the Americas, felt that it was a valuable account of international support for the Sandinistas. Norman Stockwell, publisher of The Progressive who visited Nicaragua in the 1980s, called The Death of Ben Linder "The most thorough story of [Linder's] life, his work, and his death" and an "excellent book." Noam Chomsky described the book as "a poignant and gripping tale," The Seattle Times called it "compelling" and "painstakingly detailed" and Nicaragua Monitor, a publication of the left-wing Alliance for Global Justice, praised Kruckewitt for "beautifully and honestly" telling Linder's story. The book also received recommendations from Lonely Planet, the Friends of Batahola, Green Empowerment, University of Connecticut archivist Tanya Rose Lane, and Friends of the ATC, a Nicaraguan solidarity organization.

The University of Oregon archives contain a Ben Linder collection that includes drafts and outlines of The Death of Ben Linder, recordings of interviews Kruckewitt conducted while researching the book, and correspondence Kruckewitt maintained with the archives.
