= NACLA Report on the Americas =

- Discipline: Latin American studies
- Language: English

Publication details
- History: 1967–present
- Publisher: Routledge for the North American Congress on Latin America (United States)
- Frequency: Bi-monthly

Standard abbreviations
- ISO 4: NACLA Rep. Am.

Indexing
- ISSN: 1071-4839

Links
- Journal homepage

NACLA Report on the Americas is a political magazine produced by the North American Congress on Latin America.

== History ==
The North American Congress on Latin America was founded in November 1966 by leaders of the New Left movement to analyze the mainstream media coverage of the Johnson Administration's invasion of the Dominican Republic. In 1967 the NACLA began publishing what was then known as the NACLA Newsletter. Later it adopted the name NACLA's Latin America and Empire Report and in 1977 adopted its present name, NACLA Report on the Americas.

The journal described itself as "the oldest and most widely read progressive magazine covering Latin America and its relationship with the United States".

The magazine changed from bimonthly to quarterly in 2012. It ceased print publication in 2015. However, the magazine announced a return to print through a partnership with Routledge in April 2016. The relaunch of the magazine is set for May 27, 2016.

== Format ==
A standard issue began with several short pieces on Latin American and Caribbean current events followed by a series of longer in-depth articles grouped in a thematic section on a particular topic of Latin American affairs and/or U.S. policy toward the region. Each issue ended with a review section on books related to Latin American and Caribbean political themes.
