= Joan Kruckewitt =

American journalist and writer

- Occupation: Journalist
- Known for: Writing on Latin America, writing a biography of Ben Linder

Joan Kruckewitt is an American journalist and writer. Kruckewitt has reported on Latin America and Europe for ABC Radio, Pacifica Radio, RKO, Mutual, NBC, Monitoradio, the Canadian Broadcasting Company, and NPR. She is the author of The Death of Ben Linder: The Story of a North American in Sandinista Nicaragua and has contributed to other books.

Kruckewitt visited Guatemala in 1980 for an undergraduate program, but the program was cancelled due to the extent of political violence in the country at that time—Kruckewitt described seeing the bodies of assassination victims in two separate incidents in a single week.

From 1983 to 1991, Kruckewitt lived in Nicaragua, reporting on the Contra War for ABC Radio. In 1989, Kruckewitt traveled to Panama and reported on the U.S. invasion of that country.

Kruckewitt returned to Nicaragua in 1993 to investigate the killing of Ben Linder, an American internationalist murdered by the Contras. Kruckewitt had known Linder personally, meeting him on several occasions when they both worked in Nicaragua. In 1995, assisted by fellow journalist Paul Berman, she located and interviewed a Contra who claimed to have been involved in Linder's killing and in 1999 she published the first biography of Linder. In 1997, The San Francisco Chronicle published an excerpt from the then-upcoming book, describing a Contra ambush near the town of El Cuá.

Reviewing The Death of Ben Linder in The Texas Observer, UT Austin professor Milton Jamail, who visited Nicaragua in the 1980s, described it as "compelling and well-written" and felt it accurately captured the negative effects of U.S. policy in Latin America. Pierre LaRamee, reviewing the book in the NACLA Report on the Americas, felt that it was a valuable account of international support for the Sandinistas. Norman Stockwell, publisher of The Progressive who visited Nicaragua in the 1980s, called The Death of Ben Linder "The most thorough story of [Linder's] life, his work, and his death" and an "excellent book." Noam Chomsky described the book as "a poignant and gripping tale," The Seattle Times called it "compelling" and "painstakingly detailed" and Nicaragua Monitor, a publication of the left-wing Alliance for Global Justice, praised Kruckewitt for "beautifully and honestly" telling Linder's story. The book also received recommendations from Lonely Planet, the Friends of Batahola, Green Empowerment, University of Connecticut archivist Tanya Rose Lane, and Friends of the ATC, a Nicaraguan solidarity organization.

The University of Oregon archives contain a Ben Linder collection that includes drafts and outlines of The Death of Ben Linder, recordings of interviews Kruckewitt conducted while researching the book, and correspondence Kruckewitt maintained with the archives.

Kruckewitt contributed an essay on Honduras to When States Kill: Latin America, the U.S., and Technologies of Terror in 2005. She discussed the manner in which the Reagan administration altered traditional Honduran policy by enlisting the country in their campaign against Nicaragua and building an alliance between Honduras and El Salvador. Oberlin College professor Steven Volk described this article as a particularly valuable description of the U.S. government's training of Latin American allies to torture and assassinate opponents. In 2007 she reviewed Disappeared: A Journalist Silenced, a book about the murder of Guatemalan journalist Irma Flaquer, for the Journal of Third World Studies.
