= Helena Solberg =

Brazilian-born documentarist (born 1938)

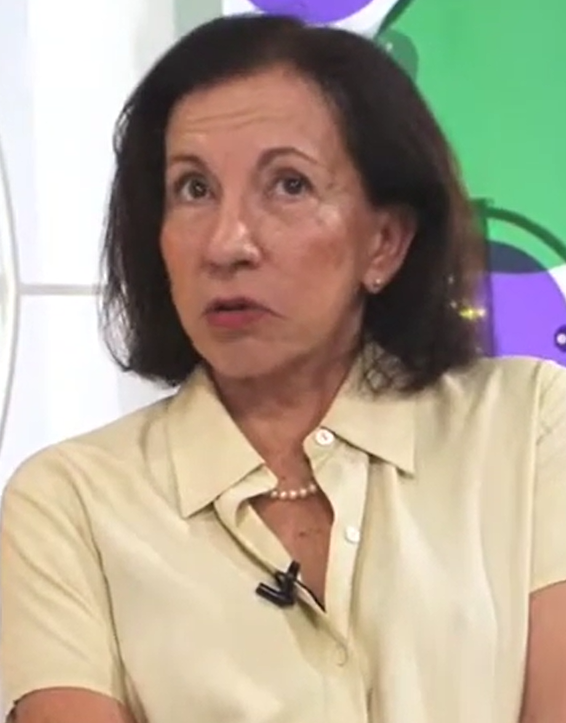
- Born: Maria Helena Collet Solberg; June 17, 1938 (age 88); Rio de Janeiro, Brazil
- Occupations: Film director, screenwriter, filmmaker
- Years active: 1966–present
- Spouse: David Mayer

Helena Solberg (born June 17, 1938, in Rio de Janeiro) is a Brazilian-born documentarist who, since 1971, has made her career in the United States. She is recognized as the only woman to participate in "Cinema Novo" movement in Brazil.

In 1983, Solberg received an Emmy Award for From the Ashes: Nicaragua Today, documentary on a new society that born of political turmoil in Central America and the role that the U.S. plays in determining its future.

== Biography ==
Helena Solberg was born in Rio de Janeiro, daughter of a Norwegian father and Brazilian mother, lived for a long time in New York City, and established herself as a producer and director of documentaries in Brazil and the United States. She began her career from contact with big names of the new movies, as Carlos Diegues and Arnaldo Jabor, a time when she lived with them during the studies at the Pontifícia Universidade Católica do Rio de Janeiro. Solberg began in adolescence working as a reporter at the Metropolitano newspaper and by mastering English and French interviewed important names like the writer Clarice Lispector and also the philosopher Simone de Beauvoir and Jean Paul Sartre.

Her debut as a filmmaker occurred in 1966 with the short film A Entrevista. In 1969 directed Meio-dia, a fiction about the revolt of students in the classroom, with the context the period of military dictatorship in Brazil, Caetano Veloso's music, É proibido proibir (It is forbidden to forbid).

In the 70s, she took up residence in the United States for about 30 years, where she directed several productions, among them: From the Ashes: Nicaragua Today (1982), which won a News & Documentary Emmy Award. From the 80s, began to produce a series of documentaries for international TV channels such as HBO, PBS, Channel 4, Radio and Television of Portugal, National Geographic Channel, among others.

In 1995, she produced, wrote and directed her first feature film, Carmen Miranda: Bananas is My Business, a mixture of documentary and fictional recreation from the singer Carmen Miranda's life. With Bananas is my business she won the Best Films award of the audience, the critic and the jury at the Festival de Brasilia. The film also was awarded with the Golden Hugo for Best documentary at the Chicago International Film Festival and was selected among the 10 best in its category by the critic Andrew Sarris.

Her latest work and first fiction feature film is Vida de Menina, based on the book by Alice Dayrell Caldeira Brant, awarded with six prizes at the Gramado Film Festival 2004: Best Film, Screenplay, Photography, Soundtrack, Art Direction and Best Film by the audience.

She has two German grandchildren and a daughter who lives in the United States with the two kids.

== Themes ==
Helena Solberg's works provide examples of feminism in film and struggles with identity. Two of her movies, Carmen Miranda and Vida de Menina show intersections between these two themes. In an interview with actress Kate Lyra, Solberg describes the character from Vida de Menina as “very transgressive, a girl always testing the limits, always passing judgement on everything and everyone around her and it is in a way, a microcosm of Brazil.” Solberg uses her movies as tools for learning, describing individual stories as examples of larger themes and issues people across Brazil can identify with.

== Legacy ==
Her third film The Double Day (1975) is often cited as the first feminist film covering Latin America. Her emphasis on diversity is also reflected in her production process, which relies on locally recruited film crews and a female-majority crew in the case of The Double Day. According to Solberg, this encourages her subjects to feel more comfortable during interviews.

Recent film analysis has criticized some of her earlier work, such as The Double Day for homogenizing Latin America. Many of her films are intended for U.S. audiences and are therefore narrated exclusively in English for U.S. audiences. As a result, few of her early films have been translated into Spanish because of budget constraints.

== Selected filmography (director) ==
| Year | Title | Credited as | Note |
|---|---|---|---|
| 1966 | A Entrevista | Director and Producer | |
| 1970 | Meio Dia | Director and Producer | |
| 1975 | The Double Day | Director and Producer | |
| 1975 | The Emerging Woman | Director and Producer | The short film The Emerging Woman is available for free viewing and download at the Internet Archive. |
| 1978 | Simplesmente Jenny | Director and Producer | American Film Festival —Blue Ribbon Award |
| 1982 | From the Ashes: Nicaragua Today | Director and Co-producer | News & Documentary Emmy Award —Outstanding Background/Analysis of a Single Current Story (Program); Chicago International Film Festival —Silver Hugo Award; American Film Festival —Red Ribbon Award; Global Village Festival —Outstanding Documentary |
| 1982 | The Brazilian Connection | Director and Co-producer | Global Village Festival —Best Documentary |
| 1983 | Chile: By Reason or By Force | Director and Co-producer | |
| 1986 | Portrait of a Terrorist | Director | |
| 1986 | Home of the Brave | Director and Co-producer | |
| 1987 | Made In Brazil | Director | |
| 1990 | The Forbidden Land | Director and Co-producer | —PBS International Award |
| 1995 | Carmen Miranda: Bananas is My Business | Narrator, Director and Co-producer | Brasilia Film Festival —Best Documentary —Best Sound Editing —Critics Award —Jury Award; Havana Film Festival —Best Documentary; Uruguay International Film Festival —Best Documentary; Chicago International Film Festival —Best Documentary; Encontro Internacional de Cinema de Portugal —Best Documentary |
| 1997 | Brasil em Cores Vivas | Director | |
| 2005 | Vida de Menina | Director | Gramado Film Festival —Best Film —Popular Jury Award —Best Cinematography —Best Art Direction —Best Soundtrack —Best Screenplay |
| 2009 | Palavra (En)cantada | Director | Grande Prêmio do Cinema Brasileiro —Best Documentary Film |
| 2013 | A Alma da Gente | Director | Festival do Rio —Best Direction |
