= Alice Dayrell Caldeira Brant =

Brazilian juvenile writer (1880–1970)

- Born: Alice Dayrell Caldeira Brant; August 28, 1880; Diamantina, Minas Gerais, Brazil
- Died: June 20, 1970 (aged 89); Rio de Janeiro, Brazil
- Occupation: Writer
- Writing career
- Pen name: Helena Morley
- Period: 1893–1895

Alice Dayrell Caldeira Brant (August 28, 1880 – June 20, 1970) was a Brazilian juvenile writer. When she was a teenager, she kept a diary, which describes life in Diamantina, Minas Gerais, Brazil which was then published in 1942. The diary was published under a pen name Helena Morley. When it was originally published it was in Portuguese under the title Minha Vida de Menina. The diary was then translated in to English by Elizabeth Bishop in 1957.

== Biography ==
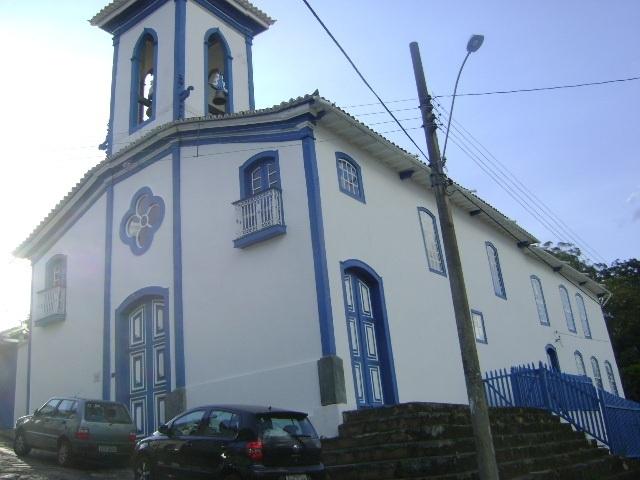
Igreja de Nossa Senhora das Mercês, located in Diamantina, MG, Brazil. The building is in the historic region of the town.

She was born in Diamantina, Minas Gerais, Brazil to an English father and a Brazilian mother. Her father worked as a diamond miner. The diary chronicles Brant's daily life, and covers her teenage years until 1895.

In 1900 Brant married Augusto Mário Calderia Brant, they had five children together. Brant says that she published her diaries in order to act as a role model for younger females who may read the book. She wrote that the diary was a way to show young women what becoming an adult means, and in this way she is acting like a grandmother to the reader. One of her daughters, Ignez Caldeira Brant, married with Abgar Renault, Brazilian Ministry of Education (1955–1956) and of the federal accountability office, Tribunal de Contas da União (1967–1973).

== Published work ==
Brant's only published work is The Diary of Helena Morley, which she began writing when she attended the Normal School. The diary discusses her daily life in the diamond mining town of Diamantina, romantic interests, but it also deals with heavier topics like loss. The book also discusses relationships, marriage in particular, but also social affairs and Brant's dreams. The topics of the book make it so that it could be a diary of a present-day teenager rather than one 60 years ago. Since Brant discusses her everyday life, insights about that point in history are able to be gained by reading the diary, particularly about the effects of the abolition of slavery. There is very little documentation about life post emancipation, making the diary an important resource for historians. Brant is praised for her ability to add humor to the discussion of racism, which typically is associated with seriousness. Another reason Brant's book was so popular is the nostalgia that it brings the reader, the provincial life of a small town, that the reader is able to find peace in the description of the simple life.

== Reception ==
The book attracted attention like many other diaries of young women. The prevalence of young female diaries is explained for many of the same reasons Brant's own diary is popular. That they allow the reader to feel young again and reminisce about when they were a teenager. Some of the first attention that was drawn to Brant for her work was after Alexandre Eulálio praised Brant for her work these praises placed Brant among classic Brazilian authors. French author Georges Bernanos also made the public aware of the book. Elizabeth Bishop was originally drawn to the work in 1952, then in 1957 Bishop published her English translation of the book. Bishop says that she was drawn to Brant's work because of Brant's impressive skills of observation and ability to recreate a scene using only words. Some have compared Brant's work to Jane Austen that even though she was from a small town in Brazil, its style is like work from England.
