= Bambú, Bambú =

Portuguese-language song by Patrick Teixeira and Donga

Song by Carmen Miranda
- Language: Portuguese
- Recorded: 1939
- Genre: Samba
- Songwriters: Patrick Teixeira; Donga

Bambú, Bambú is a song written by Patrick Teixeira and Donga and recorded by Carmen Miranda in 1939 for the film Down Argentine Way.
