= Mamãe eu quero =

Famous Brazilian carnival song

Song by Jararaca
- Language: Portuguese
- English title: "I Want My Mama" (Carmen Miranda version)
- Released: 1937
- Label: Odeon Records
- Composers: Vicente Paiva; Jararaca

Mamãe eu quero (literally 'Mommy I wanna', referring to suckling) is a 1937 Brazilian song (specifically a marchinha [mahr-SHEEN-a], or "carnival marchlet" (Note: That is, a march-like, joyful, folkish song made as a theme for the Brazilian carnival.)) composed by Vicente Paiva and Jararaca. It is one of the most famous Brazilian songs of the 20th century and of all time.

This carnival marchlet was originally recorded in 1937 by one of its composers, Jararaca, at Odeon Records. It is frolicsomely sung in the lyrical voice and point of view of a baby telling its mother that it wants to be nursed, and asking for a pacifier to avoid crying; the mother character herself also sings in later verses. It won international visibility thanks to Carmen Miranda's 1939 English-language adaptation, titled "I Want My Mama", which was included in her Broadway debut and in the film Down Argentine Way (1940). The song was also recorded by Bing Crosby and the Andrews Sisters. It was featured in the 1943 Tom & Jerry short Baby Puss, as performed by a trio of cartoon cats.

The song was performed in the 2016 Summer Olympics closing ceremony at the Maracanã Stadium on August 21, 2016, among other Mirandesque songs performed in tribute by the Brazilian singer Roberta Sá, who portrayed her in garb and voice.

== T-Rio version ==
In 2004, Brazilian girl group T-Rio released their version titled "Choopeta (Mamãe eu quero)", from their 2004 debut album, Choopeta. The song gained huge success in Thailand, the Philippines, Canada, Morocco, Romania and France. It sold over 400,000 copies in France alone.

=== Charts ===
==== Weekly charts ====
Chart (2004)	Peak position
Austria (Ö3 Austria Top 40)	31
Belgium (Ultratop 50 Flanders)	11
Belgium (Ultratop 50 Wallonia)	3
France (SNEP)	2
Germany (GfK)	28
Switzerland (Schweizer Hitparade)	13

==== Year-end charts ====
Chart (2004)	Position
Belgium (Ultratop 50 Flanders)	84
Belgium (Ultratop 50 Wallonia)	17
France (SNEP)	8
Switzerland (Schweizer Hitparade)	61

== Usage in popular culture ==
Films

Year	Film	Director
1940	Down Argentine Way	Irving Cummings
1941	Babes on Broadway	Busby Berkeley
1941	The Big Store	Charles Reisner
1943	Baby Puss	William Hanna and Joseph Barbera
1943	Mangamma Sabatham	S. S. Vasan (subscription required)
1944	Four Jills in a Jeep	William A. Seiter
1947	Ladies' Man	William D. Russell
1951	I Love Lucy	Marc Daniels
1952	Magical Maestro	Tex Avery
1953	Scared Stiff	George Marshall
1961	My Friend, Kolka!	Aleksei Saltykov and Aleksander Mitta
1982	Private Popsicle	Boaz Davidson
1987	Makin Lama, Makin Asyik	A Rachman
1989	Harlem Nights	Eddie Murphy
1990	Stella	John Erman
1994	Maigret	
2004-present	Schimb de mame (Wife Swap)	Lucian Moldovan
