= Disseram que Voltei Americanizada =

Samba song written by Luiz Peixoto and Vicente Paiva

"Disseram que Voltei Americanizada" (Portuguese for They said I've come back Americanized) is a samba song written by Luiz Peixoto and Vicente Paiva especially for Carmen Miranda. It is a direct answer to accusations that Miranda put her Brazilian roots aside to become famous enough in Hollywood. Miranda recorded it on September 2, 1940, for Odeon Records. It was one of the last songs she recorded in Brazil, alongside "Voltei pro morro", "Disso é que eu gosto" and "Diz que tem", all of them written by Paiva in a similar way to "Disseram que voltei americanizada".

== Covers ==
- Maria Bethânia (1974)
- Adriana Calcanhotto (1990)
- Caetano Veloso (1992)
- Eduardo Dusek (2000)
- Elba Ramalho (2006)
- Roberta Sá (2009)
- Ná Ozzetti (2009
- Gaby Amarantos (2013)
- Baby do Brasil (2013)
- Las Taradas (2014)
- Ordinarius (2015)
