= The Wedding Samba =

The Wedding Samba is a samba written by Abraham Ellstein, Allan Small and Joseph Liebowitz and recorded by Carmen Miranda with participation of Andrews Sisters for Decca Records on December 12, 1949.

Originally titled "The Wedding Rhumba", the music played by Xavier Cugat and His Orchestra is part of the soundtrack of the film "On an Island with You" (1948) MGM. The song is based on the melody "Der Nayer Sher", composed by Abraham Ellstein in 1940 and performed by The Barry Sisters.

Versions to reach the Billboard charts in 1950 were by Edmundo Ros (No. 16), Carmen Miranda & The Andrews Sisters (who were number #23 in the "Official Top 100 Singles" on the Billboard music chart on January 28, 1950) and Guy Lombardo & His Royal Canadians (No. 28).
