= Bonnie Bannon =

American actress

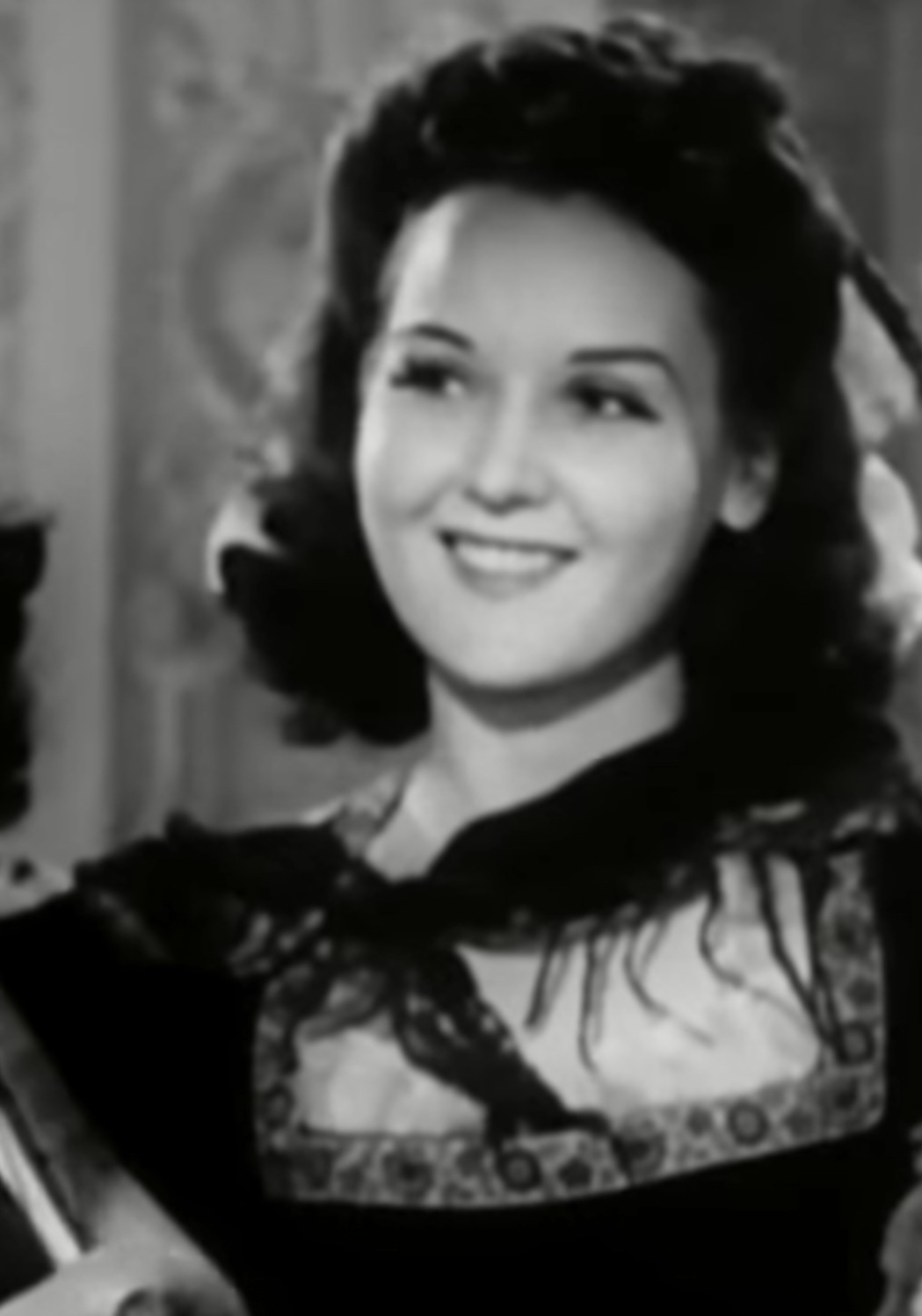
- Bannon in The Flying Deuces (1939)
- Born: Pauline Frances Bannon; June 23, 1913; Tulare County, California, U.S.
- Died: February 14, 1989 (aged 75); Irvine, California, U.S.
- Occupation(s): Actress, model
- Relatives: Alice Faye (sister-in-law); Charles P. Converse (great-grandfather)

Bonnie Bannon (June 23, 1913 – February 14, 1989), born Pauline Frances Bannon, was an American actress, dancer, and model in the 1930s and 1940s.

== Early life and education ==
Pauline Frances Bannon was born in Tulare County, California, the daughter of Walter Andrew Bannon and Juanita Alma Strong Bannon. Her father sold agricultural supplies. She graduated from Fresno High School in 1932; she was active in school theatrical productions. Her great-grandfather Charles P. Converse was a noted lumberman in California.

== Career ==
Bannon won a screen test and a contract with Warner Bros. after entering a local beauty contest in 1933. She appeared Gold Diggers of 1933 and Advice to the Lovelorn (1933) soon after, followed by Broadway Melody of 1936, The Great Ziegfeld (1936), One in a Million (1936), and The Flying Deuces (1939). She became a Goldwyn Girl, along with Lucille Ball.

Bannon was mostly seen in small roles, often as chorus girls, in films in the 1940s, including Lillian Russell (1940), Sis Hopkins (1941), The Great American Broadcast (1941), Dance Hall (1941), Week-End in Havana (1941), Tales of Manhattan (1942), The Black Swan (1942), Sweet Rosie O'Grady (1943), Four Jills in a Jeep (1944), Pin Up Girl (1944), In the Meantime Darling (1944), The Late George Apley (1947), Carnival in Costa Rica (1947), Nightmare Alley (1947), Adam's Rib (1949), and The Damned Don't Cry (1950). "Working in motion pictures is hard work and I loved having fun too much to struggle for stardom," she recalled in a 1960 interview.

== Personal life ==
Bannon married four times. Her first husband was film director Charles Faye; they married in 1934 and divorced in 1936. His sister was actress Alice Faye. In 1937 she was rumored to be engaged to marry director Busby Berkeley. Her second husband was band leader Orlando A. "Slim" Martin; they married in 1938, and divorced in 1941. In 1945, she was rumored to be engaged to marry war correspondent Philip Andrews. Her third husband was club owner Samuel D. Miller; they divorced in 1949. She married her fourth husband, lumberman William B. Jones, in 1951. She had a son, Frederick Thomas Martin. She died in 1989, at the age of 75, in Irvine, California.
