= Charles P. Converse =

19th-century American businessman

Charles Porter Converse was a mid-19th century Californian businessman who was the director of the Kings River Lumber Company and the namesake of Converse Basin Grove. He was involved in various controversies and legal issues during his lifetime and died by drowning in San Francisco Bay.

== Early life ==
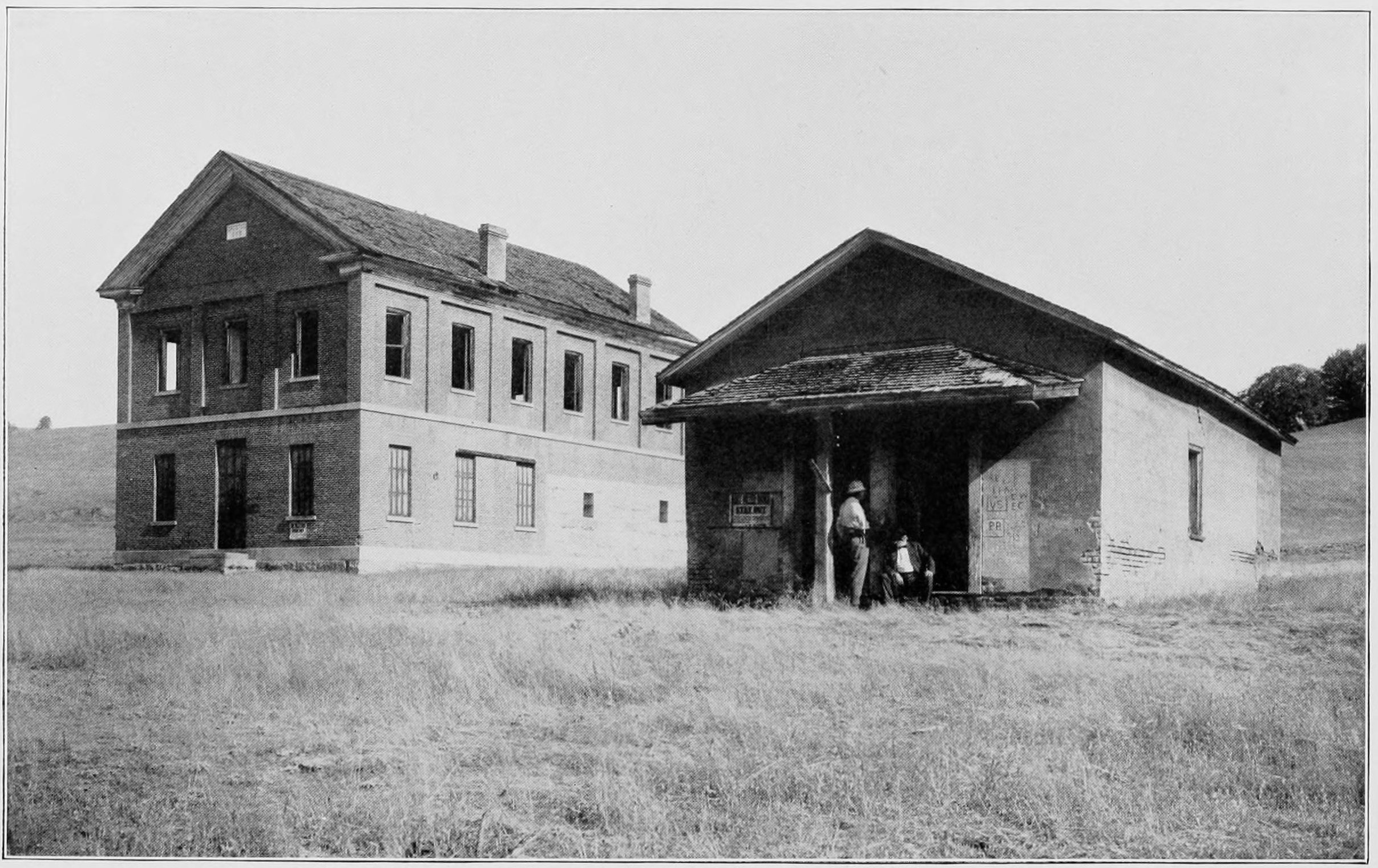
The Millerton Courthouse built in 1867 by Charles P. Converse.

Charles P. Converse was born in Michigan in 1816. He migrated to California in 1849 during the California Gold Rush. He worked in a variety of occupations, including running a general store in Coarsegold, running a ferry at Friant, and logging in Crane Valley. He was also accused of murder, stuffing ballot boxes, and engaging in illegal gambling. Despite his reputation, he was awarded a contract to build a courthouse in Millerton, which included an "escape-proof" jail. On the day of a sheriff's election, Converse was attacked. He shot at one of his assailants, killing him. He was charged with murder. Ironically, he became the first prisoner to be incarcerated in his own escape-proof jail. He was later acquitted after the jury determined he acted in self-defense. Converse was also suspected of being involved in the disappearance of a county treasurer. He married the divorced wife of another man, which caused further scandal. Despite his many controversies, Converse remained successful in his various business ventures and was respected by some members of the community.

== Kings River Lumber Company ==
In the late 1860s, Charles P. Converse claimed a large area of land in the mountains south of the King's River, which became known as Converse Basin. He planned to log the giant sequoia trees there by floating them down the river to a sawmill he planned to build in the San Joaquin Valley. He attracted the interest of investors and formed the Kings River Lumber Company in 1876. His involvement was short-lived. An economic recession stalled the venture and Converse left the company.

== Later life ==
After abandoning his land in Converse Basin, Charles P. Converse took a job as a railroad lobbyist. He later worked in the mining industry in Nevada and Utah. In his later years, he presented himself as a mining expert in San Francisco but struggled for work. As an 87-year-old man, he attempted to drown himself in San Francisco Bay but was saved by a passing boatman. He was successful in a later attempt. His body was found weighted with rocks.His great-granddaughter Bonnie Bannon was an actress in Hollywood films of the 1930s and 1940s.

== Bibliography ==
- Johnston, Hank (2003). They Felled the Redwoods (Thirteenth ed.). Stauffer Publishing. ISBN 0-87046-003-X.
- McGee, Lizzie. Mills of the Sequoias, Visalia, California, Tulare County Historical Society, Historical Bulletin, March 1952
