= Down Argentine Way =

1940 film by Irving Cummings

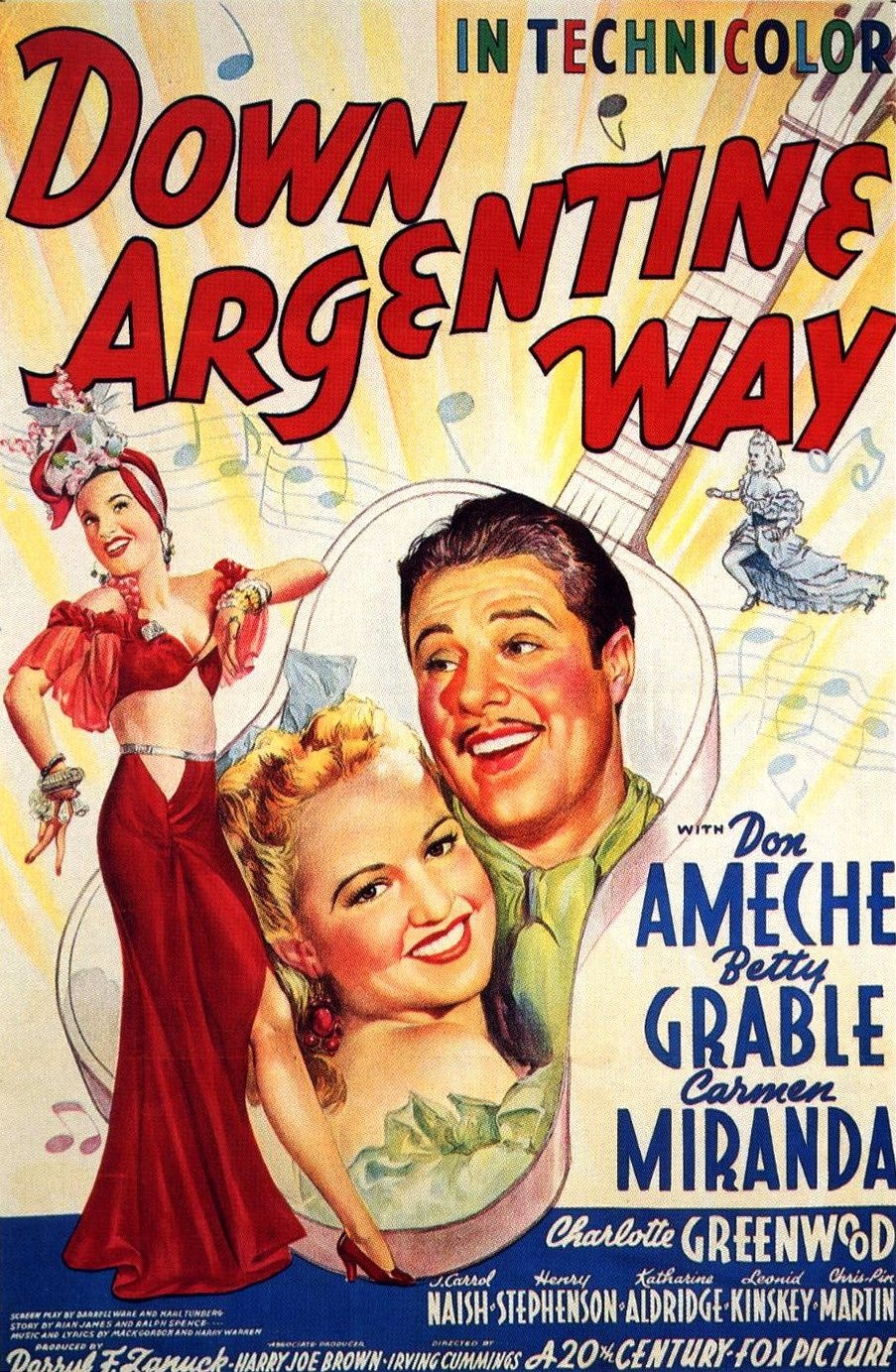
- Theatrical release poster
- Directed by: Irving Cummings
- Screenplay by: Darrell Ware; Karl Tunberg
- Story by: Rian James; Ralph Spence
- Produced by: Darryl F. Zanuck
- Starring: Don Ameche; Betty Grable; Carmen Miranda; Charlotte Greenwood; J. Carrol Naish; Henry Stephenson; Katharine Aldridge; Leonid Kinskey; Chris-Pin Martin
- Cinematography: Leon Shamroy; Ray Rennahan
- Edited by: Barbara McLean
- Music by: Mack Gordon; Harry Warren
- Distributed by: 20th Century Fox
- Release date: October 11, 1940
- Running time: 89 minutes
- Country: United States
- Language: English
- Box office: $2 million

Down Argentine Way is a 1940 American musical comedy-drama film made in Technicolor by Twentieth Century Fox. It stars Don Ameche, Betty Grable, and Carmen Miranda, with Charlotte Greenwood, J. Carrol Naish, Henry Stephenson, Katharine Aldridge, Leonid Kinskey, and Chris-Pin Martin. The film made a star of Grable in her first leading role for the studio, although she had already appeared in 31 films, and it introduced American audiences to Miranda.

The film was directed by Irving Cummings and produced by Darryl F. Zanuck from a screenplay by Karl Tunberg and Darrell Ware, based on a story by Rian James and Ralph Spence. The cinematography was by Leon Shamroy and Ray Rennahan, and the costume design was by Travis Banton. The American-composed music was by Harry Warren and Jimmy McHugh, with lyrics by Mack Gordon and Al Dubin. Choreography was done by Nick Castle.

Shooting lasted for 10 months in which members of the film's crew traveled approximately 35,000 miles (56,000 km). A second unit was sent to Buenos Aires for location establishing shots, returning with approximately 20,000 feet (6,100 m) of film, and another group flew to New York City and filmed Miranda for over a month. Miranda was then performing South American songs in the Broadway production The Streets of Paris. She was thus a prominent participant in the film although she spent no time in Hollywood.

In 2014, Down Argentine Way was deemed "culturally, historically, or aesthetically significant" by the Library of Congress and selected for preservation in the National Film Registry.

== Plot ==
Young Ricardo Quintana is preparing to voyage from Argentina to New York to sell some of his father's prize horses. Before leaving, Don Diego Quintana instructs his son that no steeds are to be sold to Binnie Crawford or any member of her family because her brother Willis cheated him years earlier. Upon arriving in New York and displaying his horses at a racetrack, Ricardo falls in love with Glenda Crawford, and goes to dinner with her later that evening. When he learns that she is Binnie's niece, he refuses to sell her the horse she wants to buy, instead selling it to her best friend Helen. He hurriedly returns to Argentina, while Glenda, perturbed by his sudden change, follows him, accompanied by her aunt.

The couple meet again in Argentina at a performance by Carmen Miranda, where they eventually confess their love for each other. When Binnie attempts to buy horses from Don Diego in person, he has her and her tour guide, Tito, evicted from his property. Ricardo subsequently introduces Glenda to his father as Miss Cunningham. When Ricardo realizes that their horse trainer Casiano has been privately racing his father's prize jumper, Furioso, Glenda encourages Ricardo to enter Furioso in a race, against Don Diego's wishes. Soon after, while attending a horse show, Don Diego discovers Glenda's true identity and disowns his son for becoming involved with Crawfords. His bad mood is compounded when Furioso refuses to jump and runs off the field.

To make up for the humiliating defeat, Ricardo, Glenda and Casiano enter Furioso in the big race at San Isidro. When Don Diego finds out, he is furious; but Casiano changes his mind when he tells him Furioso ran the mile in 1:36. As Don Diego prepares to bet a large amount of money on his horse, Tito switches jockeys and has the race fixed so Furioso will lose, causing Binnie to discharge him. When Furioso overcomes the crooked jockey and wins the race, Don Diego changes his mind about racing horses and accepts his son's relationship with Glenda.

== Cast ==
- Don Ameche as Ricardo Quintana
- Betty Grable as Glenda Crawford
- Carmen Miranda as Herself
- Charlotte Greenwood as Binnie Crawford
- J. Carrol Naish as Casiano
- Henry Stephenson as Don Diego Quintana
- Katharine Aldridge as Helen Carson
- Leonid Kinskey as Tito Acuna
- Chris-Pin Martin as Esteban
- Robert Conway as Jimmy Blake
- Gregory Gaye as Sebastian, the Headwaiter
- Bobby Stone as Panchito
- Charles Judels as Dr. Arturo Padilla, the Ambassador
- Fayard Nicholas as Specialty Dancer (as The Nicholas Brothers)
- Harold Nicholas as Specialty Dancer (as The Nicholas Brothers)
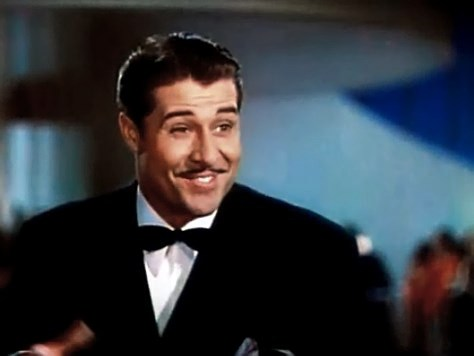
Don Ameche

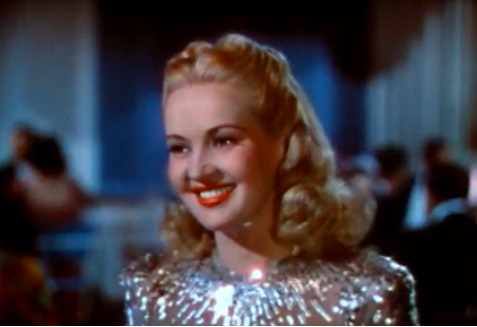
Betty Grable

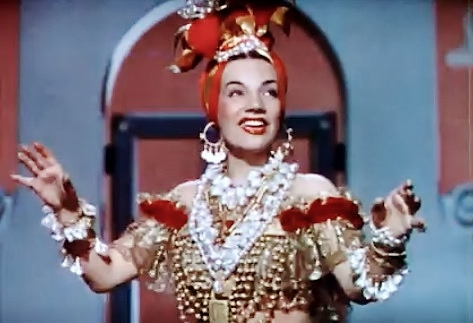
Carmen Miranda

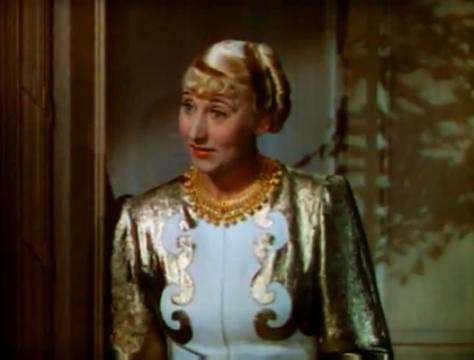
Charlotte Greenwood

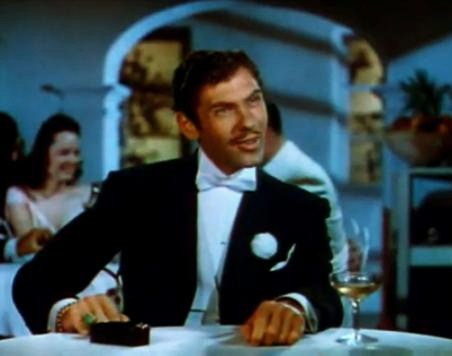
Leonid Kinskey

== Production ==
The working title of this film was The South American Way. Down Argentine Way is considered the first of many Fox films made to implement an industry-wide approach to President Franklin D. Roosevelt's "Good Neighbor Policy" toward Latin America. During World War II, the U.S. government developed an administrative agency to encourage good relations with Latin America, as there was growing German influence there. The Office of Inter-American Affairs was established to promote this. It specifically encouraged the production of "Good Neighbor" films.

Production of Down Argentine Way preceded the establishment of the Office of Inter-American Affairs, but was likely influenced by Roosevelt administration policy. The film was a box-office success, earning $2 million in domestic rentals in 1940. Fox continued to support government policy and its own self-interest by making films such as That Night in Rio and Week-End in Havana (both 1941). The films were a success in the United States, but failed as propaganda aimed at Latin America because they lacked regional authenticity.

A big star in her adopted country of Brazil, Carmen Miranda was a singer and dancer known for sex appeal. She signed a film contract with Fox in 1940 while she was appearing at a New York club, and Down Argentine Way was her first appearance in an American film. Since Miranda could not break her nightclub contract, her numbers for this film were shot in New York, while all other actors were working with director Irving Cummings in Los Angeles. Fox, with its revue approach to musicals, cut and pasted Miranda into the film. Miranda made several more films for 20th Century Fox, but the studio never was able to take advantage of the Brazilian star's special qualities to fit with American productions.

The film made Betty Grable, and began the period of her highest profile. Grable was cast in the film as a replacement for Alice Faye, who was originally intended for the female lead but became ill. Faye appeared in the follow-up films That Night in Rio and Week-End in Havana, which again feature Carmen Miranda.

The Hollywood Reporter noted that J. Carroll Naish's success in a comedy role in this film prompted Fox to feature him again in That Night in Rio. More recent sources, such as film historian W. Lee Cozad, cited the inclusion of actress Elena Verdugo (at age 14) among the cast in a bit part and note that this may have been her first film.

The movie was filmed in Los Angeles and at nearby Greenfield Ranch in Thousand Oaks, California.

== Soundtrack ==
- "Bambú, Bambú" — Carmen Miranda
- "Down Argentina Way" — Betty Grable and Don Ameche
- "Mamãe Eu Quero" — Carmen Miranda
- "Nenita" — Bando da Lua (Sung by Leonid Kinskey at the nightclub)
- "Sing to Your Señorita" — Charlotte Greenwood
- "Two Dreams Met" — Betty Grable and Don Ameche
- "South American Way" — Carmen Miranda

== Box office ==
Down Argentine Way was considered a box-office success in America, grossing $2 million in domestic sales. This paved the way for further ‘Good Neighbor’ films to be made and for Betty Grable and Carmen Miranda to become international sensations throughout the war years. “Down Argentine Way” was 20th Century Fox’s number one musical hit of 1940.

== Critical reception ==
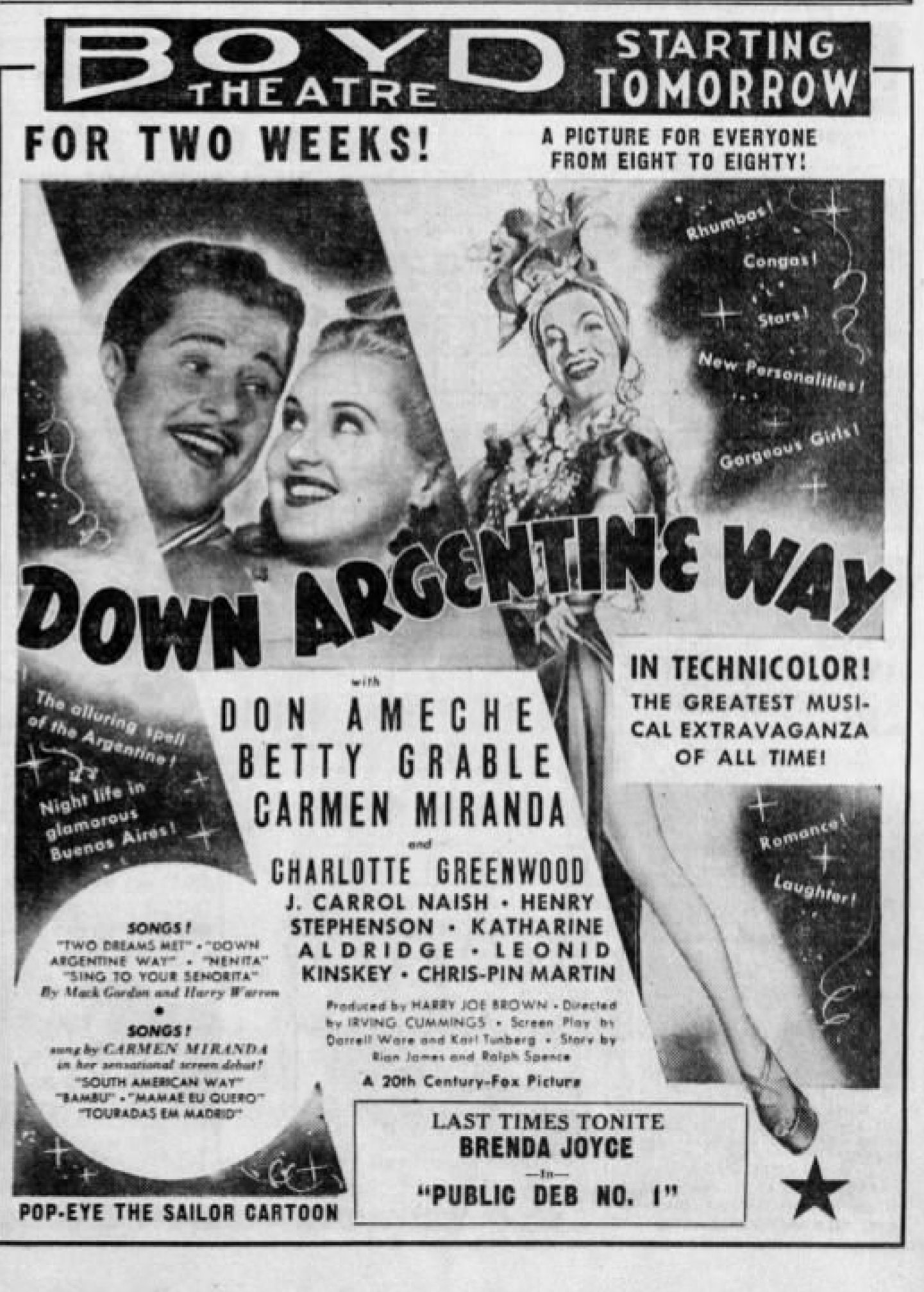
Boyd Theatre advertisement for the film Down Argentine Way (1940).

In his review for the newspaper Chicago Reader, Dave Kehr said "Betty Grable as an American heiress, Don Ameche as an Argentine horse breeder, and Carmen Miranda as something from another planet, all shot in delirious 40s Technicolor. The result is a classic example of the 20th Century-Fox approach to musicals: loud, vulgar, ridiculous, and irresistibly entertaining."

The New York Times critic Bosley Crowther, reviewing the film, found Grable irresistible. At one point he referenced what he saw as her lack of ability: "We see plenty of [Grable] – singing, dancing and wearing clothes of surprising magnificence. We even see her trying to act, which is something less of a pleasure." But then, after referring to the film's play for profits and part in "Good Neighbor Policy", he backtracks: "But, hold – what sort of good neighbor would make a remark like that! Pardon us, Miss Grable. Consider it unmade."

Down Argentine Way marked the American film debut of Carmen Miranda (as she already had appeared in Brazilian films), already known as "the Brazilian Bombshell." Turner Classic Movies described her musical numbers in the movie as "a gaudy delight—and the Nicholas Brothers serve up a characteristically joyous, effervescent routine."

However, the film was banned in Argentina after being "hissed off the screens" by audiences there for misrepresenting the real culture of the country, wrongly including many Mexican and Caribbean mannerisms and costumes, as if they were part of the Argentine landscape. In 1941, an attache at the American Embassy in Buenos Aires reported that the film had ceased being shown in Argentina because of its "ridiculous and disturbing images":

Henry Stephenson is cast as a rich race-horse owner with an atrocious adopted dialect. Don Ameche does a rumba in Spanish with castanets and talks about orchids, as rare in Argentina as they are in New York. Betty Grable does a conga with bumps...The Nicholas Brothers do a tap dance in awful Spanish and add to the Argentine impression that all Yanquis think they [Argentines] are Indians or Africans...There are jokes like—"Whenever ten Argentines get together there is a horse race."

One should note that many African American acts performed in Argentina in the 1940s and it’s doubtful they had a complete grasp of the local dialect of Spanish. Critics of the film have further remarked that the typical tango scene was contaminated by elements of Afro-Cuban rhumba and Spanish flamenco, which have nothing to do with the Argentine style.

The same criticism has been leveled against the legacy of Carmen Miranda. She has been accused by contemporary cultural writers of collaborating in the "Latino" stereotype creation for Hollywood, characterized by homogenizing all the diversity and differences between the Latin American nations into one identity, heavily influenced by Mexico and the Caribbean, and ignoring most of the other cultures within the continent. As author Karen Backstein observed, "Hollywood musicals went Down Argentine Way with 'Brazilian bombshell' Carmen Miranda and not a tango step visible anywhere."

== Awards and honors ==
The film was nominated for three Oscars, for Best Cinematography, Best Original Song and for Best Art Direction by Richard Day and Joseph C. Wright.

In 2014, Down Argentine Way was deemed "culturally, historically, or aesthetically significant" by the Library of Congress and selected for preservation in the National Film Registry.

The film is recognized by American Film Institute in these lists:

- 2006: AFI's Greatest Movie Musicals – Nominated

== Home media and rights ==
The film was released on DVD by 20th Century Fox Home Entertainment, as part of their "Marquee Musicals" line. On March 20, 2019, Rupert Murdoch sold most of 21st Century Fox's film and television assets to Disney, and Down Argentine Way was one of the films included in the deal.
