= Week-End in Havana =

1941 film by Walter Lang

- Theatrical poster
- Directed by: Walter Lang
- Written by: Karl Tunberg; Darrell Ware
- Produced by: William LeBaron
- Starring: Alice Faye; John Payne; Carmen Miranda; Cesar Romero
- Cinematography: Ernest Palmer
- Edited by: Allen McNeil
- Music by: Mack Gordon
- Production company: 20th Century Fox
- Distributed by: 20th Century Fox
- Release date: October 8, 1941
- Running time: 81 minutes
- Country: United States
- Language: English

Week-End in Havana is a 1941 American Technicolor musical film directed by Walter Lang and starring Alice Faye, John Payne and Carmen Miranda. The film was produced and distributed by Hollywood studio 20th Century Fox. It was the second of three pictures the two stars made together and the second Faye film to have a Latin American theme, typical of Fox musicals of the early 1940s. Faye was pregnant during filming. It is also known by the alternative titles A Week-End in Havana and That Week-End in Havana.

== Plot ==
When his cruise ship, the Cuban Queen, runs aground near Florida on its way to Havana, New York ocean liner magnate Walter McCracken (George Barbier) sends his vice-president, Jay Williams (John Payne), to the site to forestall any legal action. Jay gets the passengers to sign claim waivers in exchange for future passage on another McCracken ocean liner. One passenger, Macy's hosiery salesclerk Nan Spencer (Alice Faye), refuses to sign, because she has saved for years for the vacation and cannot take it at any other time. When Nan hints that she is aware of the captain's negligence in the accident, Jay accedes to her demand that the company ensure her an enjoyable vacation in Havana. Nan refuses to sign the waiver until after her vacation is completed, so McCracken orders Jay to accompany her, even though he is soon to be married to McCracken's snobbish daughter, Terry. Upon reaching Havana, Nan is delighted with the scenery but bored with Jay, who is too stodgy to provide the romance she craves. When charming fortune hunter Monte Blanca (Cesar Romero) comes across Nan, he believes that she will be the solution to his gambling debts.

Monte takes Nan to a casino run by Boris, who threatens Monte upon discovering that Nan is a simple salesclerk who cannot make good on the losses she believed Monte himself was going to pay. Jay, who has followed the couple, offers to pay off Monte's debts if he will romance Nan, thereby making sure she has a good time and will sign the waiver. Monte readily agrees, despite the jealousy of his tempestuous girlfriend, Rosita Rivas (Carmen Miranda), a singer whom Monte manages. In order to forestall Rosita's tantrums, Jay agrees to be her new manager, but regrets his decision when it becomes apparent that she wants romance as well as advice.

One evening, Rosita meets Jay at a secluded inn, but Monte and Nan are already there, and during an ensuing argument, Monte reveals that he accepted Jay's proposition in order to repay Rosita money he owes her. Nan is furious at both men for the deception, and when Jay tries to follow her after she leaves, his car is accidentally wrecked. While walking back to town, Jay and Nan discover that they are genuinely attracted to each other. The next morning, happy that her vacation is going well, Nan gives Jay a signed waiver, but tears it up when Terry appears and intimates that Jay's behavior has been strictly business. Heartbroken, Nan signs another waiver and accepts from Terry a check for $1,000, which Terry says came from Jay. When Jay sends her a check for $150, however, Nan realizes that Terry was trying to bribe her without Jay's knowledge. Terry's scheming soon becomes apparent to Jay as well, and after he angrily sends her back to New York, he finds Nan in the nightclub where Rosita is performing. As Rosita and Monte dance together, Jay and Nan are reconciled, and everyone sings the praises of their weekend in Havana.

== Cast ==
- Alice Faye as Nan Spencer
- Carmen Miranda as Rosita Rivas
- John Payne as Jay Williams
- Cesar Romero as Monte Blanca
- Cobina Wright as Terry McCracken
- George Barbier as Walter McCracken
- Sheldon Leonard as Boris
- Leonid Kinskey as Rafael, a bellhop
- Chris-Pin Martin as Driver
- Billy Gilbert as Arbolado
- Hal K. Dawson as Mr. Marks
- William B. Davidson as Captain Moss
- Maurice Cass as Tailor
- Leona Roberts as Passenger
- Harry Hayden as Passenger
- Gino Corrado as Baccarat Croupier
- Fred Malatesta as Flores, Roulette Croupier
- Mary Stuart as Dancer
- Virginia Davis as Dancer
- Bonnie Bannon as Girl in Nightclub
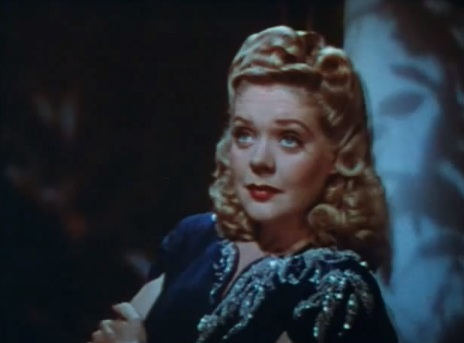
Alice Faye

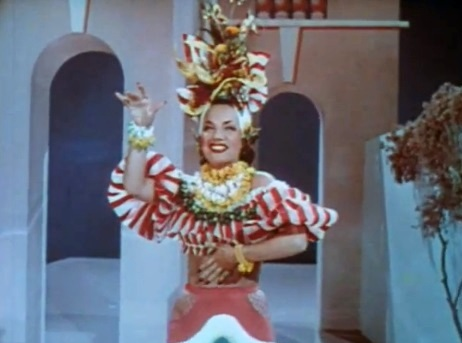
Carmen Miranda

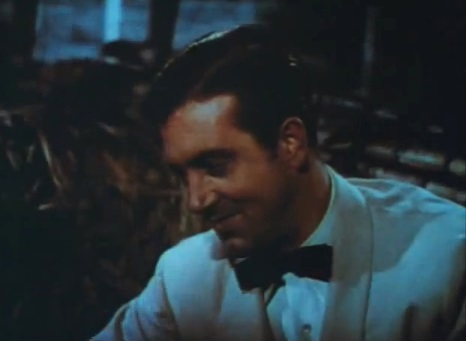
John Payne

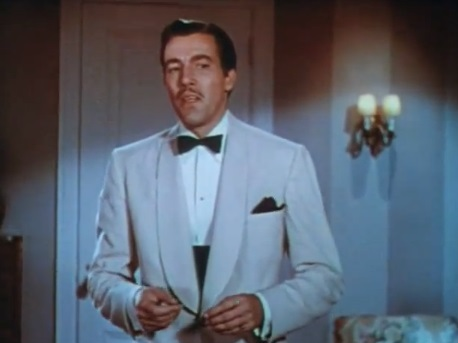
Cesar Romero

== Production ==
The film was a follow-up to Down Argentine Way and That Night in Rio.

The working titles of the film were Caribbean Cruise and Honeymoon in Havana. In early March 1941, Betty Grable was scheduled to play Nan Spencer, and executive producer Darryl F. Zanuck suggested that Henry Fonda play Jay Williams. The March 17, 1941 The Hollywood Reporter also noted that Grable and Fonda were set for the lead roles, while the May 2, 1941 The Hollywood Reporter stated that Don Ameche would have a lead role. The same publication reported in late 1940 that Jack Andrews and George Seaton were to work on the film's screenplay. Although the extent of Seaton's contribution to the completed picture has not been confirmed, the Twentieth Century-Fox Records of the Legal Department, indicate that Andrews' material was not used. The legal records also indicate that an original story outline entitled Caribbean Cruise, written by Frank S. Nugent, was not used. The story files and The Hollywood Reporter articles reveal that first Harry Joe Brown and then Fred Kohlmar were set to produce the picture.

When Kohlmar left to work at Paramount, William LeBaron assumed production responsibilities. This was the first film produced by LeBaron for Twentieth Century-Fox. The Hollywood Reporter reported that the studio had tested Phillip Reed for a role and were considering casting him in the picture, and that Mal St. Clair had been signed to direct the musical sequences. Their participation in the released picture has not been confirmed, however. According to studio records and The Hollywood Reporter, "long shots with doubles, atmospheric shots and process plates" were filmed on location in Havana and the Cuban countryside. Second unit director James Havens and his crew were on location for approximately one month. The September 26, 1941, The Hollywood Reporter reported that Alice Faye was going to retire from the screen temporarily while awaiting the birth of her first child. Faye returned from retirement for Hello Frisco, Hello (1943).

According to information in the Motion Picture Production Code, the PCA rejected a May 14, 1941, version of the script because of "the inference of an illicit sex relationship" between Rosita and Monte, and Jay and Nan, and the indication that Rosita wished to enter into such a relationship with Jay. The PCA especially objected to the use of the words "manage" and "manager" in respect to the relationships between Rosita, Monte and Jay. In June 1941, the PCA informed the studio: "We still get the impression that the word 'manage' is so used, or over-used, that one gets the feeling that it is intended to mean something which is sex suggestive." The problems were eventually resolved and the script approved.

== Reception ==
In its release week, the film went to the top of the box office (at $25,000) and topped Citizen Kane, which was in its second week of release ($9,000; $10,015 in the first week).

In his review of the film for The New York Times, Bosley Crowther wrote "a slight improvement is noted in the simple plot this time...and as usual, Fox has filled it with color and rhythm and songs. Of the latter the final number, The Nango, sung by Miss Miranda and danced by dozens of flashy girls and boys, is far and away the best."

== Soundtrack ==
- "A Week-End in Havana"
  - Music by Harry Warren
  - Lyrics by Mack Gordon
  - Sung by Carmen Miranda in the opening number with chorus and band
  - Reprised by an offscreen chorus during the montage in Havana
  - Played as background music often
- "Rebola a Bola (Embolada)"
  - Music by Aloysio De Oliveira and Nestor Amaral
  - Lyrics by Francisco Eugenio Brant Horta
  - Sung in Portuguese by Carmen Miranda in a nightclub
- "When I Love, I Love"
  - Music by Harry Warren
  - Lyrics by Mack Gordon
  - Sung by Carmen Miranda at a nightclub
- "Tropical Magic"
  - Music by Harry Warren
  - Lyrics by Mack Gordon
  - Spanish lyrics by Ernesto Piedra
  - Sung in Spanish by an unidentified trio in a nightclub. Many historians agree that this trio consisted of Lamberto Leyva, Francisco Mayorga, Luis Santos, and Joseph Garcia. (The Guadalajara Trio.)
  - Reprised by Alice Faye
  - Reprised by Alice Faye and John Payne on a hay wagon
  - Reprised a cappella by Leonid Kinskey
  - Played as background music often
- "Romance and Rhumba"
  - Music by James V. Monaco
  - Lyrics by Mack Gordon
  - Sung by Alice Faye and Cesar Romero while dancing, the other dancers
- "The Man with the Lollypop Song"
  - Music by Harry Warren
  - Lyrics by Mack Gordon
  - Sung by lollipop vendor Nacho Galindo outside Arbolado's
- "The Nango (Nyango)"
  - Music by Harry Warren
  - Lyrics by Mack Gordon
  - Sung by Carmen Miranda at the nightclub
  - Sung and danced to by the chorus
  - Danced to by Alice Faye and John Payne
- "The World Is Waiting to Waltz Again"
  - Music by Harry Warren
  - Lyrics by Mack Gordon
  - Cut from the movie
