= Roberta Sá =

Brazilian singer

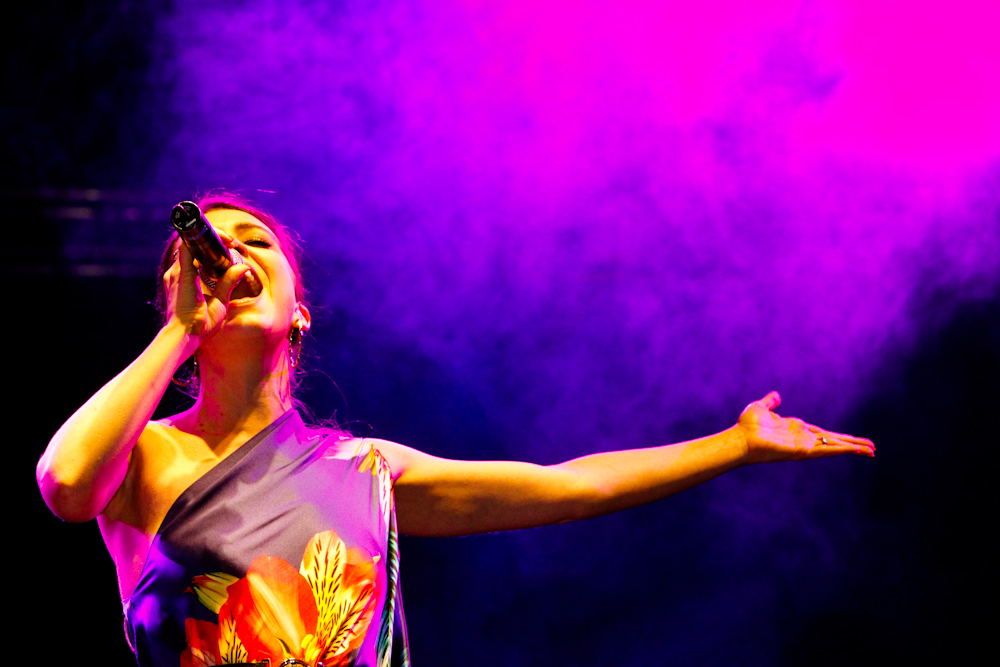
- Roberta Sá

Background information
- Born: Roberta Varela de Sá; December 19, 1980 (age 45); Natal, Rio Grande do Norte, Brazil
- Genres: MPB, samba
- Occupations: Musician, songwriter
- Instrument: Vocals
- Years active: 2004–present

Roberta Varela de Sá (born December 19, 1980) is a Brazilian singer.

Sá was born in Natal and is of Portuguese descent.

Beginning on 28 February 2011 the airline TAP Portugal began airing its "TAP With Arms Wide Open" (TAP de Braços Abertos) campaign, featuring its new slogan. Three singers — Sá, the Portuguese singer Mariza, and the Angolan singer Paulo Flores — starred in a music video with the song "Arms Wide Open."

In 2017, her album Delírio no Circo was nominated for the 2017 Latin Grammy Award for Best Samba/Pagode Album.

== Discography ==
=== Albums ===
Year	Album	Sales in Brazil	Certifications
2004	Sambas e Bossas	20,000	—
2005	Braseiro	20,000	—
2007	Que Belo Estranho Dia Para se Ter Alegria	75,000	Gold
2009	Pra se Ter Alegria	70,000	Gold
2010	Quando o Canto é Reza	35,000	—
2012	Segunda Pele	25,000	—
2015	Delírio	20,000	—
2016	Delírio no Circo	10,000	—
2019	Giro	3,000	—

=== DVD ===
Year	Album	Sales	Certifications
2009	Pra se Ter Alegria	50,000	Gold
2016	Delírio no Circo	15,000	—
