= Carmen Miranda filmography =

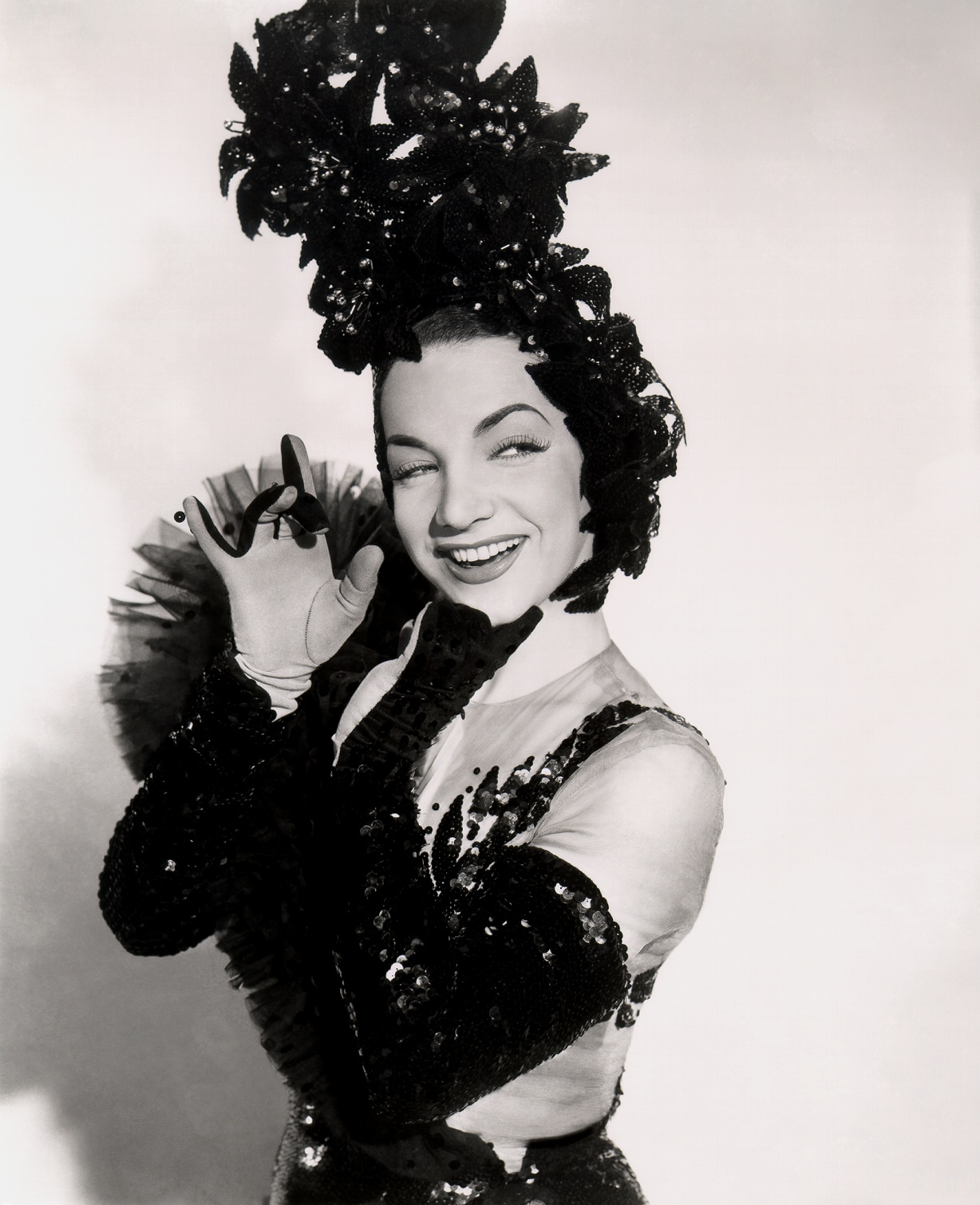
Carmen Miranda in 1944.

This is a complete filmography of Carmen Miranda, a Portuguese-Brazilian singer, actress, and dancer.

By the mid-1930s, Carmen Miranda had become the most popular female singer in Brazil, and one of the nation's first film stars. In her lifetime she had appeared in six Brazilian films and fourteen US productions. The only glimpses that today's audiences can have of her Brazilian screen performances are in the recently restored Alô, Alô, Carnaval (1936) and a tantalisingly brief clip from Banana da Terra (1939), in which she first wore on screen what would become her iconic baiana costume and extravagant turban.

In 1939 she became a star on Broadway, at the invitation of US show business impresario, Lee Shubert, and just two years later was under contract with the 20th Century-Fox studios in Hollywood. Her most memorable performances are in the musical numbers of films such as Down Argentine Way (1940), Week-End in Havana (1941), That Night in Rio (1941) and The Gang's All Here (1943).

After World War II, Miranda's films at 20th Century Fox were made in black-and-white indicating her waning status at the studio. In 1946, she bought out her Fox contract for $75,000, she made the decision to pursue her acting career free of the constraints of the studios. In 1947, she starred an independent production for United Artists, Copacabana alongside Groucho Marx, with limited success.

She was the first Latin American to inscribe her name, handprints and footprints on the Walk of Fame outside Grauman's Chinese Theatre in Hollywood on 24 March 1941, and in 1944 she became the highest-paid woman in United States.

On August 4, 1955, Miranda filmed a number for The Jimmy Durante Show, during which she complained of being out of breath. In the early hours of the following morning, she died of a heart attack in the dressing room of her Beverly Hills mansion, collapsing to the floor, her hand still clutching a mirror.

Carmen Miranda became a Latin American icon and two of the films in which she appeared—Down Argentine Way and The Gang's All Here—have been added to the Library of Congress's National Film Registry.

== Credits ==
=== Film appearances ===
List of acting credits in film, with directors and principal cast members
Title	Year	Role	Director	Co-stars	Notes
A Esposa do Solteiro	1926		Carlo Campogalliani		Uncredited
Barro Humano	1929		Adhemar Gonzaga	Lilita Rosa; Carlos Modesto; Eva Schnoor	There is a possibility that Carmen Miranda had appeared as an extra in a scene.
Degraus da Vida	1930		Lourival Agra	Carlos Eduardo; Elly Rene; Sérgio Soroa	unfinished
O Carnaval Cantado de 1932	1932	Herself	Vital Ramos de Castro		
A Voz do Carnaval	1933	Herself	Adhemar Gonzaga		
Hello, Hello Brazil!	1935	Herself	Wallace Downey; Adhemar Gonzaga	Ary Barroso; Aurora Miranda; Dircinha Batista	
Estudantes	1935	Mimi	Wallace Downey	Barbosa Júnior; Mesquitinha; Mário Reis	
Hello, Hello, Carnival!	1936	Herself	Adhemar Gonzaga	Francisco Alves; Mário Reis; Aurora Miranda	
Banana da Terra	1939	Herself	Ruy Costa	Aloysio de Oliveira; Dircinha Batista; Oscarito	
Laranja da China	1940	Herself	Ruy Costa	Dircinha Batista; Arnaldo Amaral	
Down Argentine Way	1940	Herself	Irving Cummings	Don Ameche; Betty Grable	Her first American feature film and first of ten feature films for Twentieth Century-Fox
That Night in Rio	1941	Carmen	Irving Cummings	Alice Faye; Don Ameche	
Week-End in Havana	1941	Rosita Rivas	Walter Lang	Alice Faye; John Payne; Cesar Romero	
Springtime in the Rockies	1942	Rosita Murphy	Irving Cummings	Betty Grable; John Payne; Cesar Romero	
The Gang's All Here	1943	Dorita	Busby Berkeley	Alice Faye; Phil Baker; Sheila Ryan	
Four Jills in a Jeep	1944	Herself	William A. Seiter	Kay Francis; Carole Landis; Martha Raye; Mitzi Mayfair	
Greenwich Village	1944	Princess Querida O'Toole	Walter Lang	Don Ameche; Vivian Blaine; William Bendix	
Something for the Boys	1944	Chiquita Hart	Lewis Seiler	Vivian Blaine; Michael O'Shea; Phil Silvers	
Doll Face	1945	Chita Chula	Lewis Seiler	Vivian Blaine; Dennis O'Keefe; Perry Como	
If I'm Lucky	1946	Michelle O'Toole	Lewis Seiler	Vivian Blaine; Perry Como; Phil Silvers; Harry James	Her final film for Twentieth Century-Fox.
Copacabana	1947	Carmen Novarro / Mademoiselle Fifi	Alfred E. Green	Groucho Marx	This was Carmen Miranda's first film after leaving Twentieth Century-Fox.
A Date with Judy	1948	Rosita Cochellas	Richard Thorpe	Wallace Beery; Jane Powell; Elizabeth Taylor	
Nancy Goes to Rio	1950	Marina Rodrigues	Robert Z. Leonard	Jane Powell; Ann Sothern; Barry Sullivan	
Scared Stiff	1953	Carmelita Castinha	George Marshall	Dean Martin; Jerry Lewis; Lizabeth Scott	Scared Stiff was Carmen Miranda's final film.

=== Short subjects ===
List of acting credits in short subjects, with directors and principal cast members
Title	Year	Role	Director	Co-stars	Notes
Hollywood Meets the Navy	1941	Herself	Harriet Parsons		
Sing with the Stars	1945	Herself		Dick Lane (as Richard Lane)	Produced by Army Pictorial Service
The All-Star Bond Rally	1945	Pin-up girl	Michael Audley		
Hollywood Goes to War	1954	Herself			

=== Radio appearances ===
Year	Program	Episode/source
1939	The Rudy Vallée Show	June 29, 1939
1939	The Rudy Vallée Show	August 17, 1939
1939	The Fred Allen Show	October 4, 1939
1941	Rudy Vallee Valle Varieties	May 22, 1941
1942	Command Performance	March 29, 1942
1942	Command Performance	August 4, 1942
1942	Treasury Star Parade	1942
1942	Hello Americans	"Brazil"
1943	Command Performance	"Tribute To The British Army"
1944	Command Performance	January 8, 1944
1944	Command Performance	March 25, 1944
1944	Lux Radio Theatre	"Springtime In The Rockies"
1944	Jubilee	June 26, 1944
1945	Mail Call	January 10, 1945
1945	National Radio Hall of Fame	"Breakfast In Hollywood"
1945	Which Is Which	January 31, 1945
1945	Command Performance	February 1, 1945
1945	The Danny Kaye Show	February 15, 1945
1946	The Fred Allen Show	March 10, 1946
1946	Here's To Veterans	"First Song Sioux City Sue"
1946	Command Performance	June 30, 1946
1947	The Chase and Sanborn Hour	November 23, 1947
1947	The Ford Show	April 2, 1947
1950	The Hedda Hopper Show	December 10, 1950
1951	The Big Show	March 25, 1951

=== Television appearances ===
Year	Program	Episode/source	Note
1948	Texaco Star Theatre	5 October 1948	
1949	Erskine Johnson's Hollywood Reel		
1949	The Ed Wynn Show	29 September 1949	
1949	Texaco Star Theatre	18 January 1949	
1950	Texaco Star Theatre	21 November 1950	
1951	TV Club	28 February 1951	
1951	What's My Line?	18 November 1951	
1951	The Colgate Comedy Hour	16 December 1951	
1951	Texaco Star Theatre	6 November 1951	
1951	Four Star Revue	21 March 1951	
1952	The Colgate Comedy Hour	24 February 1952	
1952	Texaco Star Theatre	23 September 1952	
1953	Four Star Revue	7 March 1953	
1953	Toast of the Town	13 September 1953	
1955	The Jimmy Durante Show	15 October 1955	Last appearance before her death on 5 August 1955.

=== Stage work ===
- The Streets of Paris (1939–1940)
- Sons o' Fun (1941–1942)
