= The Carmen Miranda Collection =

- DVD cover
- Produced by: Various
- Production company: 20th Century Fox
- Distributed by: 20th Century Fox Home Entertainment
- Release date: June 17, 2008
- Country: United States
- Language: English

The Carmen Miranda Collection is a box set featuring five top movie titles starring Carmen Miranda. It was released by 20th Century Fox Home Entertainment on June 17, 2008.

It is part of the 20th Century Fox Marquee Musicals, that refers to a collection of films released on DVD by Twentieth Century-Fox.

== Films ==
Film title	Main cast	Director	Original Release Year
The Gang's All Here	Alice Faye, Phil Baker, Benny Goodman	Busby Berkeley	1943
Greenwich Village	Don Ameche, Vivian Blaine	Walter Lang	1944
Something for the Boys	Michael O'Shea, Vivian Blaine	Lewis Seiler	1944
Doll Face	Vivian Blaine, Dennis O'Keefe	Lewis Seiler	1946
If I'm Lucky	Vivian Blaine, Perry Como, Harry James, Phil Silvers	Lewis Seiler	1946

== Reception ==
The New York Times has published an article in which he says, "The Gang’s All Here seems like an ingeniously designed vintage pinball machine: a triumph of mechanical engineering, not electronics." And continues: "the production was the apotheosis of Miranda’s career at Fox, and the other four films in the set follow its decline. Walter Lang's 1944 Greenwich Village, with Don Ameche and Vivian Blaine, and Lewis Seiler's barely recognizable version of the Cole Porter musical Something for the Boys (1944), with Ms. Blaine and Phil Silvers, both have glorious Technicolor and decent production values," according to the critic, but in Doll Face and If I'm Lucky, Miranda had been reduced to supporting roles. "In the new realism that dominated postwar cinema, which stories could accommodate a character as utterly unreal as the Lady in the Tutti-Frutti Hat?," question.
