= James Basevi =

British art director (1890–1962)

- Born: September 21, 1890; Plymouth, Devon, England
- Died: March 27, 1962 (aged 71); Bellflower, California, U.S.
- Occupation: Art director
- Years active: 1925–1956

James Basevi (born 21 September 1890, Plymouth, Devon, England – d. 27 March 1962, Bellflower, California) was a British-born art director and special effects expert.

After his military service during World War I Basevi emigrated to Canada and later on to the United States. He began his career in 1924 with MGM, designing sets for silent films. After the advent of talkies, Basevi became the head of MGM's special effects department, helping to create the earthquake scene in San Francisco (1936). He also worked on the storm sequence in John Ford's The Hurricane for 20th Century Fox.

In 1943, he shared an Oscar for art direction with William S. Darling for The Song of Bernadette. He was nominated for Oscars for Wuthering Heights (1939), The Westerner (1940), The Gang's All Here (1943) and The Keys of the Kingdom (1944).

== Filmography ==
- The Big Parade (1925)
- The Circle (1925)
- The Tower of Lies (1925)
- Soul Mates (1925)
- Pretty Ladies (1925)
- Confessions of a Queen (1925)
- The Devil's Circus (1926)
- Dance Madness (1926)
- Bardelys the Magnificent (1926)
- The Temptress 1926)
- The Mysterious Island (1929)
- Tarzan and His Mate (1934) special effects
- China Seas (1935) special effects
- San Francisco (1936) special effects
- Dead End (1937) special effects
- History Is Made at Night (1937) special effects
- The Good Earth (1937) special effects
- The Hurricane (1937) special effects
- The Adventures of Marco Polo (1938) special effects
- Blockade (1938) special effects
- The Cowboy and the Lady (1938)
- The Real Glory (1939)
- Wuthering Heights (1939)
- They Shall Have Music (1939)
- Raffles (1939)
- The Westerner (1940)
- The Long Voyage Home (1940)
- Tobacco Road (1941)
- A Yank in the R.A.F. (1941)
- Son of Fury (1942)
- Moontide (1942)
- China Girl (1942)
- The Black Swan (1942)
- Thunder Birds (1942)
- Guadalcanal Diary (1943)
- Paris After Dark (1943)
- The Ox-Bow Incident (1943)
- Sweet Rosie O'Grady (1943)
- Claudia (1943)
- They Came to Blow Up America (1943)
- Hello, Frisco, Hello (1943)
- Jitterbugs (1943)
- Bomber's Moon (1943)
- Wintertime (1943)
- Happy Land (1943)
- The Dancing Masters (1943)
- The Gang's All Here (1943)
- Stormy Weather (1943)
- Holy Matrimony (1943)
- The Gang's All Here (1943)
- Heaven Can Wait (1943)
- Jane Eyre (1944)
- The Moon is Down (1943)
- The Song of Bernadette (1943)
- Home in Indiana (1944)
- Greenwich Village (1944)
- In the Meantime, Darling (1944)
- Wilson (1944)
- The Eve of St. Mark (1944)
- Lifeboat (1944)
- Casanova Brown (1944)
- The Lodger (1944)
- The Fighting Sullivans (1944)
- The Purple Heart (1944)
- Four Jills in a Jeep (1944)
- Ladies of Washington (1944)
- Roger Touhy, Gangster (1944)
- Tampico (1944)
- Pin Up Girl (1944)
- Bermuda Mystery (1944)
- Buffalo Bill (1944)
- The Keys of the Kingdom (1944)
- Spellbound (1945)
- The Dark Corner (1946)
- Home, Sweet Homicide (1946)
- Johnny Comes Flying Home (1946)
- If I'm Lucky (1946)
- It Shouldn't Happen to a Dog (1946)
- Somewhere in the Night (1946)
- My Darling Clementine (1946)
- Claudia and David (1946)
- Margie (1946)
- Duel in the Sun (1946)
- 13 Rue Madeleine (1946)
- Strange Triangle (1946)
- Carnival in Costa Rica (1947)
- Thunder in the Valley (1947)
- The Homestretch (1947)
- The Late George Apley (1947)
- The Brasher Doubloon (1947)
- The Shocking Miss Pilgrim (1947)
- Captain from Castile (1947)
- Three Godfathers (1948)
- Fort Apache (1948)
- Somewhere in the Night (1948)
- Mighty Joe Young (1949)
- She Wore a Yellow Ribbon (1949)
- To Please a Lady (1950)
- Wagonmaster (1950)
- Night Into Morning (1951)
- The People Against O'Hara (1951)
- Across the Wide Missouri (1951)
- My Man and I (1952)
- Just This Once (1952)
- Island in the Sky (1952)
- Battle Circus (1953)
- East of Eden (1954)
- The Searchers (1956)
