= The Alice Faye Collection =

American film collection

- Produced by: Various
- Production company: 20th Century Fox
- Distributed by: 20th Century Fox Home Entertainment
- Country: United States
- Language: English

The Alice Faye Collection is a DVD box set with four movies of the famous 1930s and 1940s film star Alice Faye.

It is part of the 20th Century Fox Marquee Musicals, that refers to a collection of films released on DVD by Twentieth Century-Fox.

== Background ==
In December 2007, Fox Home Entertainment have announced the release of "The Alice Faye Collection" for February 20, 2007 as part of their 20th Century Fox Marquee Musicals series of releases.

== Films ==
Film title	Main cast	Director	Original Release Year
On the Avenue	Dick Powell, Madeleine Carroll	Irving Berlin	1937
Lillian Russell	Don Ameche, Henry Fonda	Irving Cummings	1940
That Night in Rio	Don Ameche, Carmen Miranda	Irving Cummings	1941
The Gang's All Here	Carmen Miranda, Phil Baker, Benny Goodman	Busby Berkeley	1943

== Reception ==
The New York Times says, "20th Century Fox Home Entertainment has been turning out some first-rate discs lately, but something has gone horribly wrong with “The Alice Faye Collection,”. San Diego Reader wrote that "The Alice Faye Collection has four of the great Fox musical star's best films: On the Avenue, Lillian Russell, That Night in Rio, and The Gang's All Here. My favorites are the last two because they are brightened by the Brazilian bombshell Carmen Miranda. Miss Faye exuded the charm and innocence our boys were fighting for in World War II."
