= Paducah (disambiguation) =

Paducah is the name of multiple places in the United States of America:

- Paducah, Kentucky, a city on the Ohio River
- Paducah, Texas, a small town named after the city in Kentucky
- Paducah micropolitan area, an area centered on the Kentucky city, consisting of three counties in the Jackson Purchase region of Kentucky and one in southern Illinois

== Other ==
- Paducah (song), a song recorded by Carmen Miranda and Benny Goodman in 1943.
