= The Lady in Red (Allie Wrubel song) =

1935 song by Allie Wrubel and Mort Dixon

"The Lady in Red" is a 1935 song with lyrics by Mort Dixon and music by Allie Wrubel. Its title may have been inspired by Ana Cumpănaș, referred to in newspapers at the time as the "lady in red." She was in the company of John Dillinger just before he was shot by the FBI in July 1934, and was said to have betrayed him to the law. The song makes no mention of such subject matter, and it is written in a quasi-Latin rhumba style.

== Use in drama ==
=== In Caliente ===
"The Lady in Red" is featured in the soundtrack of the 1935 film In Caliente. In the film, the song is the subject of an elaborate staging by Busby Berkeley in the dimly lit title nightclub. Soloist Wini Shaw lights a series of candles as she sings the lyric, the "Dancing DeMarcos" (Tony and Sally) perform a specialty dance, and comic singer Judy Canova uses the chorus to come on to Edward Everett Horton in her customary aggressively rural yodeling style.

=== Merrie Melodies ===
The song was (as was customary at the time) promoted by Warner through a Merrie Melodies cartoon entry, "The Lady in Red". Merrie Melodies composer/arranger Carl Stalling made use of the tune again in a 1937 Porky Pig cartoon, "Picador Porky," which like "The Lady In Red" was set in Mexico and which additionally included the title tune from In Caliente.

The song took on a life of its own, becoming a staple of Warner Bros. cartoons, as Stalling would include it in the underscore anytime a female character would appear in a red outfit (such as the raucous, red-hooded Bobby soxer in "Little Red Riding Rabbit"), leading to the joke among the Warners animation staff, "Don't draw anything with a red pencil, or Stalling will give us 'The Lady In Red' again." Bugs Bunny sang a few bars of the song (changing the lyric to "the rabbit in red") in 1949's "The Windblown Hare".

=== The Twilight Zone ===
The song features in the 1962 episode "Young Man's Fancy" of the television series The Twilight Zone as an "oldie" obsessed over by a disturbed man.
