= Sing with the Stars =

- Produced by: Army Pictorial Service; Special Services Division
- Distributed by: Army Pictorial Service
- Release date: 1945
- Running time: 10 minutes
- Country: United States
- Languages: English; Portuguese

Sing with the Stars is a 1945 American short film produced by the Army Pictorial Service in cooperation with the Music Section Special Services Division. The film stars Carmen Miranda and Richard Lane.

== Cast ==
- Carmen Miranda as herself
- Richard Lane as himself

== Musical numbers ==
- "Tico-Tico no Fubá" (Abreu, Oliveira)
- "I, Yi, Yi, Yi, Yi (I Like You Very Much)" (Gordon, Warren)
- "Mamãe Eu Quero" (Paiva, Jararaca)
- "K-K-K-Katy" (O'Hara)

== Home media ==
In 2008 Sing with the Stars was re-released by 20th Century Fox part of the Carmen Miranda Collection DVD box set.

== See also ==
- Carmen Miranda filmography
