= Fruit hat =

Style of hat popularized by Brazilian performer Carmen Miranda

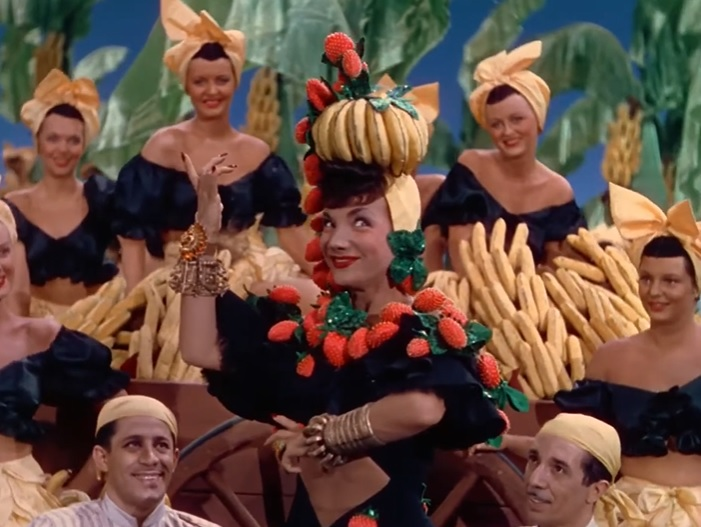
Carmen Miranda in The Gang's All Here (1943 film)

A fruit hat is a festive and colorful hat type popularized by Carmen Miranda and associated with tropical locales. This type of hat has been worn by fashionistas, in films, by comic strip characters, and for Halloween. The fruit used tends to sit on the top or around the head, and varies in type, e.g. bananas, berries, cherries, pineapples.

== History ==
A fashion report in Los Angeles Times from 1895 called the use of mendiant the "newest trimming" for hats, and noted that hats were "tipped far over the eyes". The Chicago Tribune in 1915 reported on fruit ribbons, along with feathers, flowers, and frills, as trim for Easter hats. A report on artificial fruit used on hats was in a 1918 edition of The New York Times. Fruit and vegetable trim on "gay hats" featured in the first millinery show of the season at New York's Saks Fifth Avenue in 1941, and overshadowed flowers. Lil Picard, a millinery designer for the custom-made department of Bloomingdale's, sought inspiration from nature for her hats and while on vacation "listening to the birds, gazing through the lacy outlines of foliage and watching the ripening fruits, she dreamed of trimmings."

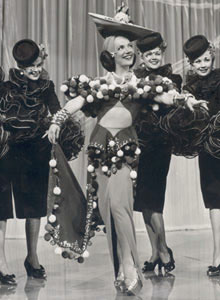
Carmen Miranda in The Gang's All Here (1943)

Brazilian "bombshell" Carmen Miranda, who "made a habit of wearing exotic headdresses/hats often adorned with fruit", appears as a singer named Dorita in the 1943 film The Gang's All Here. The movie includes a musical number called "The Lady in the Tutti Frutti Hat" with barefoot chorus girls dressed in yellow turbans, black crop tops, and ruffled yellow miniskirts who manipulated giant papier-mâché bananas and bounced inflatable strawberries off their toes at the whims of legendary choreographer Busby Berkeley.

== Use in marketing ==
Inspired by Carmen Miranda's costumes, the Chiquita Banana logo featured a cartoon image of an anthropomorphic banana with a human face and a selection of fruit adorning its hat. The logo was created for United Fruit Company in 1944 by Dik Browne, who is perhaps best known for his Hägar the Horrible comic strip. In advertising of the 1940s, the logo character's voice was supplied by vocalist Patti Clayton followed by Elsa Miranda, June Valli and Monica Lewis. The concept was created by a BBDO advertising team headed by Robert Foreman with the song lyrics written by Garth Montgomery and music composed by Len MacKenzie. The original Chiquita Banana advertisement was produced by Disney Studios and ran in movie theaters.

The company later became Chiquita Brands International and would use a banana wearing a fruit hat headdress on its logo for decades. In 1987 the banana character was replaced with a woman by artist Oscar Grillo, creator of the Pink Panther, to reflect "the image the public had of Miss Chiquita as a real person."

== See also ==
- List of hat styles
