= Jo-Carroll Dennison =

American actress (1923–2021)

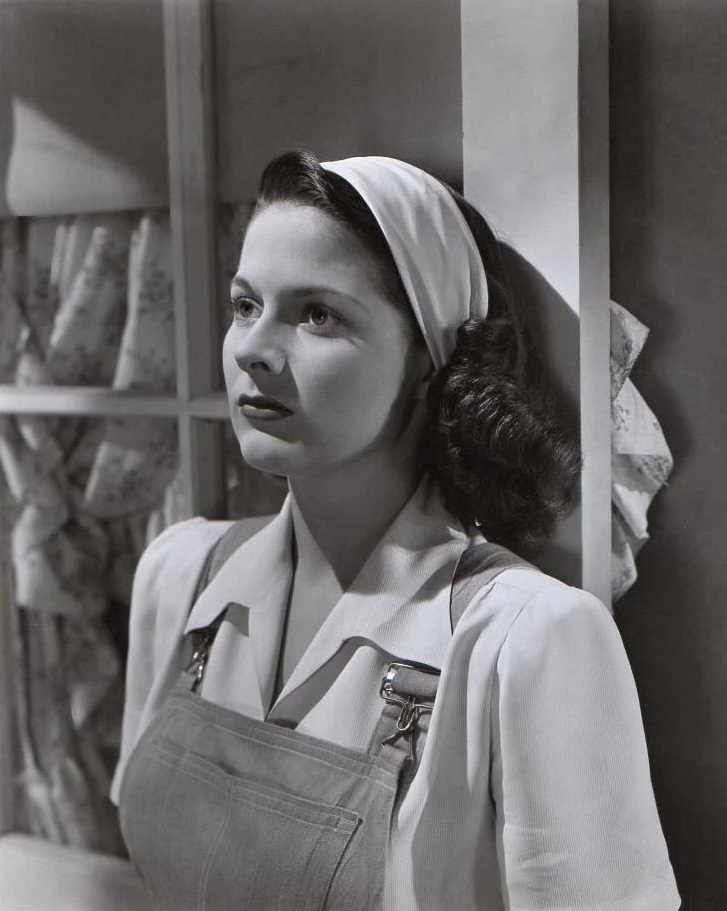
- Dennison in 1944
- Born: December 16, 1923; Florence, Arizona, U.S.
- Died: October 18, 2021 (aged 97); Idyllwild–Pine Cove, California, U.S.
- Occupation: Actress
- Years active: 1942–1976
- Spouses: Phil Silvers (m. 1945; div. 1950) Russell Stoneham (m. 1954; div. 1981)
- Children: 2

Jo-Carroll Dennison (December 16, 1923 – October 18, 2021) was an American actress and model who was Miss America 1942.

== Early years ==
Dennison was born on December 16, 1923, in Florence, Arizona, the daughter of Elizabeth (née Brownd) and Harry Arthur Dennison, who ran a traveling medicine show in Texas. She was born in the infirmary of a men's state prison in Arizona, delivered by the prison doctor as he was the only medical help her traveling parents could find. Her father had wanted her to be born in California so the couple had been driving west from Texas when her mother went into labour.

Her family later lived in San Francisco; Santa Barbara, California; and Tyler, Texas. She was graduated from Hale Center High School in 1940, and was a stenographer in Tyler for Governor Earl B. Mayfield.

== Pageantry ==
Dennison was crowned Miss America September 12, 1942, after having entered the contest as Miss Texas. She had earlier won both the talent and the swimsuit competitions in the contest. As Miss America during World War II, much of her time was spent visiting "Defense plants, hospitals and service camps" and selling war bonds. Per the Miss America tradition, it was insisted that she perform and dine with senior military personnel. She lobbied instead for doing so with the enlisted men, which helped set the standard for Bob Hope and other higher profile entertainers to do the same.

She was one of the first Miss Americas to refuse wearing a bathing suit during the year-long tour required of winners. She delivered a video-taped message at the celebration of the 100th anniversary of the Miss America organization, in which she said "I am glad to have lived long enough to see how women’s fight against inequality, sexual harassment, and abuse has finally come to the fore. And I hope that future Miss Americas can help further the progress of healing the divisions in our country along racial lines, fight voter suppression, and motivate us all to respond to the specter of climate change."

== Film and television career ==
After her time as Miss America, Dennison went to Hollywood. On November 18, 1942, 20th Century Fox signed her to a seven-year contract. She had roles in Winged Victory and The Jolson Story, and many television roles, including The Frank Sinatra Show, Adventures of Kit Carson, Dick Tracy, Abbott and Costello, and Perry Mason

As described in her memoir, “normal” life in Hollywood revolved around the party scene at the homes of Frank Sinatra, Bing Crosby, and Danny Kaye. Most influentially, she was a regular at Saturday gatherings at Gene Kelly's home, infused with music (including impromptu piano and song with Andre Previn and Paul Robeson) and literary conversation. These evenings of “radical liberal intellectualism” were punctuated with rare drop-ins the likes of Garbo, Garland, and Monroe. She watched friends and colleagues persecuted under McCarthy's Red Scare and witnessed the ravages of blacklisting throughout her cultural world.

== Later life ==
She lived in Greenwich Village in the 1950s, working briefly with Look magazine and then as a secretary at the offices of Rodgers and Hammerstein. Later, after moving back to Los Angeles, she worked as a production assistant at LUX Video Theater—the first live television drama—and later as a hospice care provider. Dennison lived for two years in San Miguel de Allende, Mexico, working on her memoir, which was published in 2021. She ultimately settled in Idyllwild, California.

== Personal life ==
Dennison married comedian Phil Silvers on March 2, 1945. They divorced March 8, 1950. The union produced no children. Dennison later married television producer Russell Stoneham and had two sons, Peter and John, with him. Her second marriage inspired the storyline for Redford and Streisand's dilemma in Arthur Laurents’ The Way We Were, she the free-spirited liberal and he the conservative pragmatist. Other close relationships included journalist Blackie Sherrod and Sydney Chaplin, son of Charlie Chaplin.

Dennison was the oldest-living Miss America when she died from chronic obstructive pulmonary disease on October 18, 2021, at the age of 97.

== Filmography ==
Year	Title	Role	Notes
1943	The Song of Bernadette	Young Nun	uncredited
1943	The Gang's All Here	minor role	uncredited
1944	Ladies of Washington	Frieda	uncredited
1944	Something for the Boys	minor role	uncredited
1944	Winged Victory	Dorothy Ross	
1945	State Fair	Girl	uncredited
1946	The Missing Lady	Gilda Marsh	
1946	The Jolson Story	Ann Murray	
1950	Beyond the Purple Hills	Mollie Rayburn	
1950	Prehistoric Women	Nika	
1951	Secrets of Beauty	Jo Carroll Dennison	
1951	Pickup	Irma	
1951	A Millionaire for Christy	Nurse Jackson	uncredited
1976	Everybody Rides the Carousel	Stage 5	voice

Awards and achievements
Preceded by Rosemary LaPlanche	Miss America; 1942	Succeeded by Jean Bartel
Preceded by Gloria Byrnes	Miss Texas; 1941	Succeeded by Joyce Courrege
