= A Musical Monologue =

1923 film

- Produced by: Lee De Forest
- Starring: Phil Baker
- Release date: April 15, 1923
- Country: United States
- Language: English

A Musical Monologue is a 1923 American short film produced by Lee De Forest in his Phonofilm sound-on-film process. The film features Phil Baker, well-known vaudevillian, singing and playing the accordion.

This film was one of the films DeForest showed on April 12, 1923 to an audience of electrical engineers at the Engineering Society Building's Auditorium at 33 West 39th Street in New York City. The film premiered with 17 other short Phonofilms on April 15, 1923 at the Rivoli Theatre in New York City.
