= Pat Buttram =

American character actor (1915–1994)

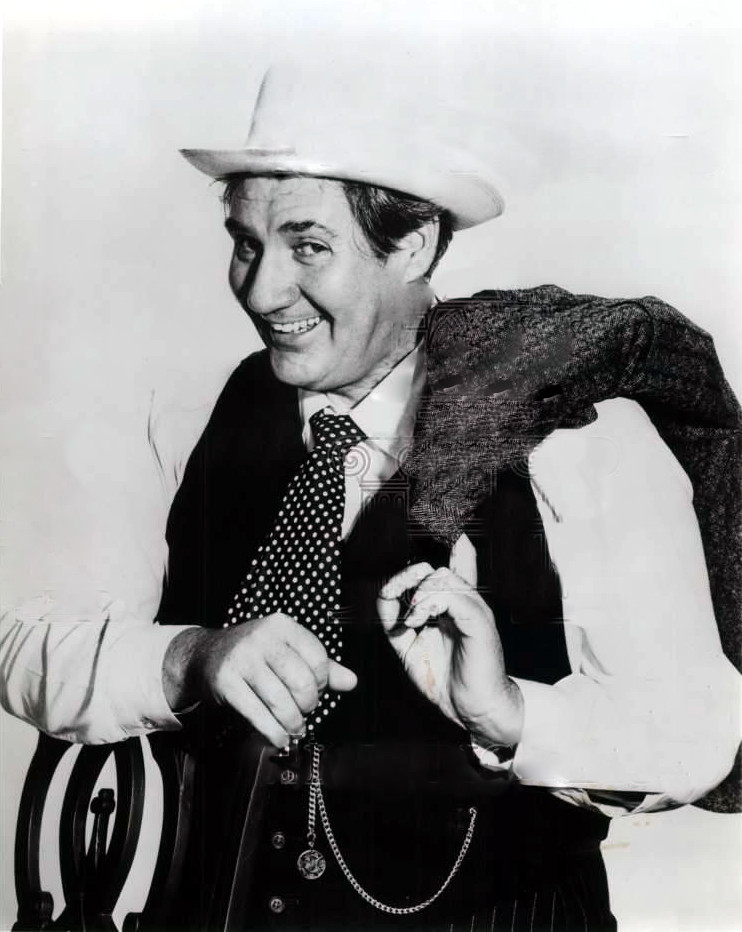
- Buttram in 1970 as Mr. Haney on Green Acres
- Born: Maxwell Emmett Buttram; June 19, 1915; Addison, Alabama, U.S.
- Died: January 8, 1994 (aged 78); Los Angeles, California, U.S.
- Resting place: Maxwell Chapel, United Methodist Church, Haleyville, Alabama, U.S.
- Education: Birmingham-Southern College
- Occupation: Actor
- Years active: 1944–1994
- Political party: Republican
- Spouses: Dorothy McFadden (m. 1936; div. 1946) Sheila Ryan (m. 1950; died 1975)
- Children: 2 (1 adopted)

Maxwell Emmett "Pat" Buttram (June 19, 1915 – January 8, 1994) was an American character actor. He was known for playing the sidekick of Gene Autry and for playing the character of Mr. Haney in the television series Green Acres. He is primarily remembered for his distinctive voice, which "has been described as sounding like a handful of gravel thrown in a Mix-Master."

== Early life ==
Buttram was born on June 19, 1915 in Addison, Alabama to Wilson McDaniel Buttram, a Methodist minister, and his wife Mary Emmett Maxwell. He had an older brother, Augustus McDaniel Buttram, and five other elder siblings. When Pat was a year old, his father was transferred to Nauvoo, Alabama. Buttram graduated from Mortimer Jordan High School, then located in Morris, Alabama, and entered Birmingham-Southern College to study for the Methodist ministry.

== Career ==
Buttram performed in college plays and on a local radio station, then became a regular on the National Barn Dance broadcast on WLS (AM) in Chicago. He also had his own program on CBS.

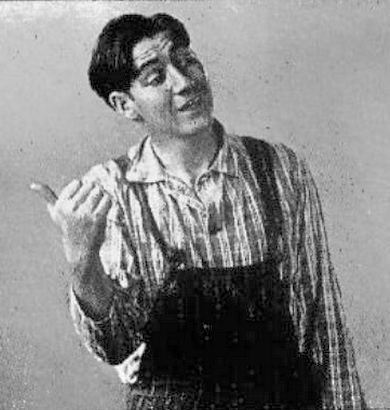
Buttram in 1944

Buttram went to Hollywood in the 1940s and became a sidekick to Roy Rogers. However, because Rogers already had two regulars, Buttram was dropped.

He was then picked by Gene Autry, recently returned from his World War II service in the United States Army Air Corps. Buttram co-starred with Autry in more than 40 films and in over 100 episodes of his television show. Buttram's first Autry film was The Strawberry Roan in 1948.

In the late 1940s, Buttram joined Autry on his radio show Melody Ranch and then on television with The Gene Autry Show. During the first television season, Buttram went by Pat or Patrick, with a variety of last names. From the second season, he used his own name.

Buttram also played Mr. Eustace Haney in the 1965-1971 television comedy Green Acres. He did voice work for several Disney animated features, playing Napoleon (hound dog) in The Aristocats, the Sheriff of Nottingham (a wolf) in Robin Hood, Luke (muskrat) in The Rescuers, Chief (hunting dog) in The Fox and the Hound, and one of the Toon bullets in Who Framed Roger Rabbit. He had a recurring role as the voice of Cactus Jake on Garfield and Friends. One of his later roles was an appearance in Back to the Future Part III. His final voice-over was A Goofy Movie, released a year after his death. Buttram is credited as one of the writers on the Hee Haw television show for two episodes in 1969 and 1970.

Buttram made the oft-quoted observation about the 1971 "rural purge," in which CBS canceled many programs with a rural theme or setting: "CBS canceled everything with a tree in it – including Lassie," referring to the cancellations of Green Acres, The Beverly Hillbillies and Petticoat Junction.

In 1987, Buttram returned to television with Gene Autry on Melody Ranch Theater on The Nashville Network. It featured Gene Autry's classic Western movies, cut down for television, with original opening and closing segments of America's first singing cowboy and his comedic sidekick reminiscing about the making of the movies and events in the industry at the time.

== Personal life ==
In 1936, Buttram married Dorothy McFadden. The couple adopted a daughter but divorced in 1946. In 1950, he married actress Sheila Ryan; they were together until her death in 1975. They had a daughter named Kathrine (nicknamed Kerry), born in 1954.

Buttram retired from acting in 1980 and made his home in his native Winston County, Alabama. However, he returned to California, where he made frequent personal appearances.

Buttram was a staunch Republican who helped Ronald Reagan spice up his speeches with political quips. In 1993, Buttram expressed surprise that with the inauguration of Bill Clinton and Al Gore as president of the United States and vice president of the United States, respectively, so many Hollywood actors were "taken with that whole country-boy image they tried to project". According to his niece Mary Buttram Young, "Uncle Pat would always say 'I'm from Alabama – I can see right through that'."

=== Death and legacy ===
Buttram died from kidney failure at the UCLA Medical Center on January 8, 1994, at the age of 78. He is interred at the cemetery at the Maxwell Chapel United Methodist Church in the Pebble community near Haleyville, Alabama.

In 1988, Buttram was honored with a star on the Hollywood Walk of Fame and one on the Alabama Stars of Fame in Birmingham, Alabama.

== Filmography ==
Year	Title	Role	Notes
1944	The National Barn Dance	Himself	
1948	The Strawberry Roan	Hank	
1949	Riders in the Sky	Chuckwalla	
1950	Mule Train	Smokey Argyle	
1950	Beyond the Purple Hills	Mike Rawley	
1950	Indian Territory	Shadrach Jones	
1950	The Blazing Sun	Mike	
1951	Gene Autry and the Mounties	Scat Russell	
1951	Texans Never Cry	Ranger Pecos Bates	
1951	Silver Canyon	Pat Claggett	
1951	The Hills of Utah	Dusty Cosgrove	
1951	Valley of Fire	Breezie	
1952	The Old West	Panhandle Gibbs	
1952	Night Stage to Galveston	Himself	
1952	Apache Country	Himself	
1952	Barbed Wire	"Buckeye" Buttram	
1952	Wagon Team	Deputy Pat Buttram	
1952	Blue Canadian Rockies	Rawhide	
1961	Wild in the Country	Mr. Longstreet, the Mechanic	uncredited
1963	Twilight of Honor	Cole Clinton	
1964	Roustabout	Harry Carver	
1964	The Hanged Man	Otis Honeywell	TV film
1966	Sergeant Deadhead	The President	
1968	The Sweet Ride	Texas Gambler	
1969	I Sailed to Tahiti with an All Girl Crew	Blodgett	
1970	The Aristocats	Napoleon	voice animated film
1971	The Gatling Gun	Tin Pot	
1972	Evil Roy Slade	Narrator	TV film uncredited
1973	Robin Hood	Sheriff of Nottingham	voice animated film
1976	Meanwhile, Back at the Ranch	Narrator	
1977	The Rescuers	Luke, Swamp Inhabitant	voice animated film
1979	Angels Brigade	Used Car Salesman	
1979	The New Misadventures of Ichabod Crane	Washington the Horse	voice TV movie
1981	The Fox and the Hound	Chief, Hunting Dog	voice animated film
1981	Choices	Pops	
1988	The Good, the Bad, and Huckleberry Hound	Red Eye the Bartender	voice TV film
1988	Who Framed Roger Rabbit	A Toon Bullet No. 3	voice live action/animated film
1990	Back to the Future: Part III	Jeb, Saloon Old Timer No. 3	
1995	A Goofy Movie	Possum Park Emcee	voice animated film

== Partial television credits ==
Year(s)	Series	Role	Episode(s)
1950-1955	The Gene Autry Show	Pat Jensen/himself/Patrick Smith/Deputy Pat/Hap Wallace/Sheriff Pat	83 episodes
1961-1963	The Real McCoys	(1) and (2) Cousin Carl (3) and (4) Pat Clemens	(1) Season 4 Episode 30: "Back to West Virginny" (1961) (2) Season 4 Episode 31: "Fly Away Home" (1961) (3) Season 6 Episode 13: "Luke the Reporter" (1962) (4) Season 6 Episode 35: "The Partners" (1963)
1962-1967	The Ed Sullivan Show	himself	8 episodes
1963	The Danny Thomas Show	Harvey Bullock	Season 11 Episode 3: "Here's the $50 Back"
1964	The Tycoon	Brian	Season 1 Episode 2: "The Shotgun Meyer"
1964	The Alfred Hitchcock Hour	(1) Charlie Hill (2) Emory	(1) Season 2 Episode 17: "The Jar" (2) Season 3 Episode 6: "Lonely Place"
1965	The Munsters	Pop Mallory	Season 1 Episode 17: "All-Star Munster"
1965	The Cara Williams Show	Charlie Paradise	(1) "Paradise Lost and Found" (1965) (2) "Paradise Freezes Over" (1965)
1965-1971	Green Acres	Mr. Haney	147 episodes
1966-1967	Pistols 'n' Petticoats	(1) Pa Turner (2) Jake Turner	(1) Season 1 Episode 1: "A Crooked Line" (1966) (2) Season 1 Episode 22: "The Golden Fleece"
1966-1969	Petticoat Junction	Mr. Haney	(1) Season 3 Episode 21: "The County Fair" (1966) (2) Season 7 Episode 3: "The Other Woman" (1969) (3) Season 7 Episode 9: "A Most Momentous Occasion" (1969)
1967	The Hollywood Squares	himself	5 episodes
1968-1973	The Dean Martin Comedy Hour	himself	3 episodes
1970	The Merv Griffin Show	himself	episode dated June 25, 1970
1971	The Jimmy Stewart Show	Oscar Pettywhistle	Season 1 Episode 13: "Luther's Last Love"
1972	Alias Smith and Jones	First Sheriff	Season 2 Episode 23: "Bad Night in Big Butte"
1972	The Mouse Factory	himself	"Bullfighting to Bullfrogs"
1973	Adam-12	Drunk Man	Season 5 Episode 23: "Keeping Tabs"
1974	Emergency!	Hermit	Season 3 Episode 20: "Floor Brigade"
1977	Chico and the Man	Jeb Gibson	Season 3 Episode 19: "Gregory Peck Is a Rooster"
1979	The Sacketts	Tuthill the Bank Teller	Miniseries (1) Season 1 Episode 1: Part I" (2) Season 1 Episode 2: Part II"
1979	The Dukes of Hazzard	Sam	Season 2 Episode 1: "Days of Shine and Roses"
1982	Simon & Simon	Jonathan Evans	Season 2 Episode 6: "Rough Rider Rides Again"
1983	The Love Boat	The Chef	(1) Season 6 Episode 27: "Hits and Missus/Return of Annabelle/Just Plain Folks Medicine/Caught in the Act/The Real Thing/Do Not Disturb/Lulu & Kenny (Country Music Jamboree): Part 1" (2) Season 6 Episode 28: "Hits and Missus/Return of Annabelle/Just Plain Folks Medicine/Caught in the Act/The Real Thing/Do Not Disturb/Lulu & Kenny (Country Music Jamboree): Part 2"
1984	Family Feud	himself	
1986	Knight Rider	Buck	Season 4 Episode 20: "Fright Knight"
1989-1991	Garfield and Friends	Cactus Jake (10 episodes), Cactus Josh (1), Cactus Jimmy (1), Cactus Joe (1) (voice)	10 episodes; animated series
1990	Gravedale High	Inspector Nitpicker (voice)	Season 1 Episode 3: "Save Our School"
1990-1991	Who's the Boss	Chappy	(1) Season 7 Episode 13: "Broadcast Blues" (1990) (2) Season 7 Episode 24: "The Road to Washington: Part 1" (1991) (3) Season 7 Episode 25: "The Road to Washington: Part 2" (1991)
1991	Tiny Toon Adventures	Bicycle Bob (voice)	Season 1 Episode 56: "Son of the Wacko World of Sports"
1991	Rugrats	Eddie (voice)	Season 1 Episode 13: "Graham Canyon" (1991); animated series
