= Mule Train (film) =

1950 film by John English

- Theatrical release poster
- Directed by: John English
- Screenplay by: Gerald Geraghty
- Story by: Alan James
- Produced by: Armand Schaefer
- Starring: Gene Autry; Sheila Ryan; Robert Livingston; Frank Jaquet; Vince Barnett; Syd Saylor
- Cinematography: William Bradford
- Edited by: Richard Fantl
- Production company: Gene Autry Productions
- Distributed by: Columbia Pictures
- Release date: February 22, 1950
- Running time: 70 minutes
- Country: United States
- Language: English

Mule Train is a 1950 American Western film directed by John English and written by Gerald Geraghty. The film stars Gene Autry, Sheila Ryan, Robert Livingston, Frank Jaquet, Vince Barnett and Syd Saylor. It was released on February 22, 1950, by Columbia Pictures.

== Plot ==
Prospectors have discovered a natural cement mine that yields material of astonishing durability. However, greedy contractor Sam Brady enjoys a monopoly on the transportation of crushed rock, which is being used to build a local dam. U.S. Marshal Gene Autry discovers that Brady has used this method before, and his dams always burst shortly after construction, flooding entire towns. Despite Brady's power, Autry campaigns to have the new dam constructed using cement.

== Cast ==
- Gene Autry as Gene Autry
- Sheila Ryan as Carol Bannister
- Robert Livingston as Sam Brady
- Frank Jaquet as Clayton Hodges
- Vince Barnett as Barber Mulkey
- Syd Saylor as Skeeter
- Sandy Sanders as Bud
- Pat Buttram as Smokey Argyle
- Gregg Barton as Keg Rollins
- Kenne Duncan as Latigo
- Roy Gordon as John MacKnight
- Stanley Andrews as Chalmers
- Robert Hilton as Bancroft
- Robert J. Wilke as Bradshaw
- John Miljan as Judd Holbrook
- Robert Carson as Bill Cummings
- Pat O'Malley as Charley Stewart
- John McKee as Wilson
- Champion as Gene's Horse
