= Beyond the Purple Hills =

1950 film by John English

- Theatrical release poster
- Directed by: John English
- Written by: Norman S. Hall
- Produced by: Armand Schaefer
- Starring: Gene Autry; Champion; Jo Dennison; Don Beddoe; James Millican; Pat Buttram
- Cinematography: William Bradford
- Edited by: Richard Fantl
- Music by: Mischa Bakaleinikoff
- Production company: Gene Autry Productions
- Distributed by: Columbia Pictures
- Release dates: July 25, 1950; December 16, 1950 (Los Angeles)
- Running time: 69 minutes
- Country: United States
- Language: English

Beyond the Purple Hills is a 1950 American Western film directed by John English and written by Norman S. Hall. The film stars Gene Autry, Jo-Carroll Dennison, Don Beddoe, James Millican, Don Reynolds and Hugh O'Brian. It was released on July 25, 1950, by Columbia Pictures.

== Plot ==
When a bank robbery results in the death of the sheriff, Judge Beaumont asks horse trainer Gene Autry to take the sheriff's place. Gene, who has helped Beaumont deal with his fractious son Jack, agrees. Beaumont reveals that he wants to rewrite his will to exclude Jack, prompting a fight between father and son. When the judge is murdered soon after, Gene is forced to arrest Jack, although he does not believe that Jack is guilty.

== Cast ==
- Gene Autry as Gene Autry
- Jo-Carroll Dennison as Mollie Rayburn
- Don Beddoe as Amos Rayburn
- James Millican as Rocky Morgan
- Don Reynolds as Chip Beaumont
- Hugh O'Brian as Jack Beaumont
- Roy Gordon as Judge Beaumont
- Harry Harvey Sr. as Sheriff Whiteside
- Pat Buttram as Mike Rawley
- Gregg Barton as Ross Pardee
- Robert J. Wilke as Jim Connors
- Ralph Peters as Tim
- Frank Ellis as Corey
- John Cliff as Dave Miller
- Sandy Sanders as Doghouse
- Frankie Marvin as Marty
- Boyd Stockman as Ed
- Maudie Prickett as Aggie
- Champion the Wonder Horse as Champ

== Reception ==
A contemporary review in the Los Angeles Times noted: "Gene and his musical gang warble and strum delightfully between fights ... John English's direction makes the story move quickly and clearly."
