= Paducah (song) =

Song performed by Carmen Miranda

Paducah (“If you wanna, you can rhyme it with bazooka”) is a song composed by Leo Robin and Harry Warren, originally performed by Carmen Miranda and Benny Goodman and His Orchestra. The song was featured in the 1943 musical film The Gang's All Here, starring Alice Faye, Carmen Miranda, and James Ellison. This film helped solidify Miranda’s iconic image as "The Lady in the Tutti Frutti Hat".

The song is characterized by the swing jazz genre, with elements of American popular music of the time. This blend is typical of Hollywood musical productions in the 1940s, particularly those involving Benny Goodman and his orchestra, who were leading figures in the genre.

== Background ==
The song Paducah, composed by Leo Robin and Harry Warren, stands out as one of the main musical numbers in the film The Gang's All Here (1943). The soundtrack of the film is enriched by the collaboration of renowned musicians, including Carmen Miranda and Benny Goodman and His Orchestra, along with a special appearance by Tony DeMarco.

The song alludes to an idealized vision of the small town of Paducah, located in the state of Kentucky, which, through its melody and interpretation, takes on a symbolic dimension. By referencing this place, the song evokes a sense of simplicity and joy, portraying a serene and peaceful way of life—almost utopian—in stark contrast to the fast-paced rhythm of big cities. Within the context of the film, this musical number is widely recognized for its visual and musical grandeur, solidifying itself as one of the production's most memorable highlights.
