= Journey to a Star =

Song by Judy Garland
- Language: English
- Released: 1944
- Songwriters: Harry Warren; Leo Robin

Journey to a Star or A Journey to a Star is a song composed by Harry Warren with lyrics by Leo Robin introduced by Alice Faye in the 1943 film The Gang's All Here. It was a charted recording in 1944 by Judy Garland.
