= Song of Texas =

1943 film by Joseph Kane

- Directed by: Joseph Kane
- Written by: Winston Miller
- Starring: Roy Rogers; Sheila Ryan; Barton MacLane
- Distributed by: Republic Pictures
- Release date: 1943
- Country: United States
- Language: English

Song of Texas is a 1943 American Western film starring Roy Rogers, originally released by Republic Pictures.

== Plot ==
After a fib by Sam Bennett, a former rodeo star and old friend of Roy's, to his daughter back East that he owns a big ranch, Roy agrees to pretend that's the truth when Sue Bennett decides to travel to Texas and pay her father a visit. Complications develop when Sue makes a deal to sell half the ranch to someone else.

== Cast ==
- Roy Rogers as Roy
- Sheila Ryan as Sue Bennett
- Barton MacLane as Jim Calvert
- Arline Judge as Hildegarde

== Home media ==
On August 25, 2009, Alpha Video released Song of Texas on Region 0 DVD.
