= In Caliente =

1935 film by Lloyd Bacon

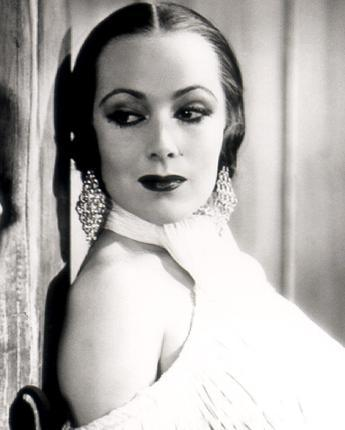
- Promotion photo of Dolores del Rio for In Caliente
- Directed by: Lloyd Bacon
- Written by: Ralph Block; Warren Duff
- Screenplay by: Jerry Wald; Julius J. Epstein
- Produced by: Edward Chodorov
- Starring: Dolores del Río; Pat O'Brien; Leo Carrillo; Edward Everett Horton; Glenda Farrell
- Cinematography: George Barnes; Sol Polito
- Edited by: James Gibbon
- Music by: Bernhard Kaun
- Production company: Warner Bros. Pictures
- Distributed by: Warner Bros. Pictures
- Release date: May 25, 1935
- Running time: 84 minutes
- Country: United States
- Language: English

In Caliente (also known as Viva Señorita) is a 1935 American romantic musical comedy film directed by Lloyd Bacon, starring Dolores del Río and Pat O'Brien. The film was written by Ralph Block and Warren Duff. The musical numbers were choreographed by Busby Berkeley. It was released by Warner Bros. Pictures on May 25, 1935.

== Plot ==
Lawrence, critic and full-time boozer, comes to the cabaret In Caliente in Mexico to distance from Clara, a woman who wishes to marry him. Lawrence falls in love with the beautiful Mexican dancer Rita Gómez, forgetting that he once wrote a scathing review of her.

== Cast ==
- Dolores del Río as Rita Gomez
- Pat O'Brien as Larry MacArthur
- Leo Carrillo as Jose Gomez
- Edward Everett Horton as Harold Brandon
- Glenda Farrell as Clara
- Tony De Marco as one of The De Marcos
- Sally De Marco as one of The De Marcos
- Phil Regan as Peter
- Wini Shaw as Lois (as Winifred Shaw)
- Luis Alberni as Magistrate
- George Humbert as Photographer
- Harry Holman as Biggs
- Soledad Jiménez as Rita's Maid (as Soledad Jimenez)
- Herman Bing as Florist
- Judy Canova as Specialty Singer

== Production ==
The film was set at the lavish Agua Caliente Casino and Hotel in Tijuana, Mexico. The resort hotel featured alcoholic beverages during Prohibition in the United States as well as live entertainment and casino gambling that attracted top Hollywood celebrities. Elaborate dance numbers choreographed by Busby Berkeley, including the hit song "The Lady in Red", were a major component of the musical film.
