= My Man and I =

1952 film

- Directed by: William Wellman
- Written by: John Fante; Jack Leonard
- Produced by: Stephen Ames
- Starring: Ricardo Montalbán; Shelley Winters; Claire Trevor
- Cinematography: William C. Mellor
- Edited by: John Dunning
- Music by: David Buttolph
- Production company: Metro-Goldwyn-Mayer
- Distributed by: Metro-Goldwyn-Mayer
- Release date: September 5, 1952 (New York)
- Running time: 99 minutes
- Country: United States
- Language: English
- Budget: $946,000
- Box office: $685,000

My Man and I is a 1952 American Metro-Goldwyn-Mayer drama film directed by William Wellman and starring Ricardo Montalbán, Shelley Winters, Wendell Corey and Claire Trevor. The plot concerns an ambitious Mexican immigrant farm laborer (Montalbán) who falls in love with an alcoholic waitress (Shelley Winters) despite being pursued by the beautiful wife of his boss. The film's sets were designed by the art director James Basevi.

== Plot ==
Chu Chu Ramirez, a Mexican farm laborer who works as a grape picker in California, has recently become an American citizen and is determined to better himself. While his cousin Manuel and his friends Celestino and Willie spend their pay on gambling and women, Chu Chu buys new clothes and an encyclopedia.

When grape season ends, Chu Chu takes a job clearing land on Ansel Ames' farm near Sacramento. Ames and his wife are having marital problems, and the lonely Mrs. Ames, who initially regards Chu Chu with contempt as a foreigner, becomes attracted to him. Chu Chu is kind to her but does not return her affections and rejects her attempt to seduce him. Chu Chu is drawn to Nancy, a troubled waitress with a drinking problem whose former husband, a test pilot, was killed in a crash. Chu Chu sells his prized possession, a letter from the president, to raise money for Nancy and asks her to be his girl, although she protests that he should not waste his time on a "wino" such as herself.

Chu Chu has finished his work for Ames and receives his paycheck, but the bank refuses payment. When Chu Chu confronts Ames about the bad check, Ames threatens him with a shotgun. Chu Chu brings the matter before a labor board and is promised his pay within 60 days. He plans to find Nancy, who has moved to Los Angeles, to marry her as soon as he receives his pay. However, at the end of the 60 days, when Chu Chu again attempts to collect his pay, Ames attacks him. Chu Chu strikes Ames and leaves.

Ames argues with his wife and hits her. She falls into a gun rack, causing a rifle to fire, striking Ames in the shoulder. The Ameses falsely accuse Chu Chu of shooting Ames, and Chu Chu is arrested. After learning that Nancy has attempted suicide in Los Angeles, Chu Chu escapes from jail to rush to her side. They are briefly reunited, but police soon find Chu Chu and return him to custody.

At Chu Chu's trial, the Ameses continue to claim that Chu Chu shot Ames, and he is found guilty but receives a light sentence. He will lose his citizenship for being a convict, something he considers a "fate worse than death". His cousin and friends camp just outside the Ames property, staring at the Ameses and playing Mexican songs in protest. Nancy, still ill, arrives and accuses Mrs. Ames of destroying Chu Chu before she collapses and is rushed to the hospital. The Ameses attempt to reconcile with each other and realize that they must tell the truth even though they will be charged with perjury. After their confession, Chu Chu is released and reunites with Nancy at the hospital.

== Cast ==
- Shelley Winters as Nancy
- Ricardo Montalbán as Chu Chu Ramirez
- Wendell Corey as Ansel Ames
- Claire Trevor as Mrs. Ansel Ames
- José Torvay as Manuel Ramirez
- Jack Elam as Celestino Garcia
- Robert Burton as Sheriff
- Pascual García Peña as Willie Chung
- George Chandler as Bartender Frankie
- Juan Torena as Vincente Aguilar
- Carlos Conde as Joe Mendacio
- Ralph Moodyas Rogers

== Reception ==
In a contemporary review for The New York Times, critic Oscar Godbout wrote:

If William A. Wellman's latest directorial effort ... fails to be a completely satisfactory and moving drama of the dignity and courage of "little" people, the least that can be said is that he missed making a fine and rewarding film by an irritatingly small margin. ... While "My Man and I" is a long way above an average or mediocre film, the authors of the script, John Fante and Jack Leonard, did not provide a story with enough substance or understanding to provide a solid basis for a monument to the people with whom they dealt. ... "My Man and I" misses being an important picture because its story was not conceived with true concern for its subjects. But the efforts of the director to compensate for this weakness make it worth seeing.

According to MGM records, the film earned $469,000 in the U.S. and Canada and $216,000 elsewhere, returning a loss to the studio of $563,000.
