= Sheila Ryan =

American actress (1921–1975)

- Ryan in 1941
- Born: Katherine Elizabeth McLaughlin; June 8, 1921; Topeka, Kansas, U.S.
- Died: November 4, 1975 (aged 54); Woodland Hills, Los Angeles, U.S.
- Occupation: Actress
- Years active: 1939–1968
- Spouses: Allan Lane (m. 1945; div. 1946); Edward Norris (1950s); Pat Buttram (m. 1950)
- Children: 1

Sheila Ryan (born Katherine Elizabeth McLaughlin, June 8, 1921 – November 4, 1975) was an American actress who appeared in more than 60 movies.

== Career ==
Born in Topeka, Kansas, Ryan went to Hollywood in 1939 at the age of 18. Her acting career began when she tried out for a role on a program at television station W6XAO (later KCBS) in Los Angeles, California. An article in a contemporary magazine reported, "She proved to be a perfect television type and was given a role at once."

At age 19, Ryan was selected by a group of Hollywood directors as one of 13 "baby stars of 1940." She was signed by 20th Century Fox in 1940 and was credited in her early films as Bettie McLaughlin. Adopting the name Sheila Ryan, she starred in the crime drama Dressed to Kill the following year.

Ryan appeared in other memorable films, including two Laurel and Hardy movies, Great Guns (1941) and A-Haunting We Will Go (1942), and the Busby Berkeley musical The Gang's All Here (1943). Ryan also was featured in several Charlie Chan and Michael Shayne mysteries. By the late 1940s, however, her career waned and she began appearing mostly in B movies, especially low-budget westerns.

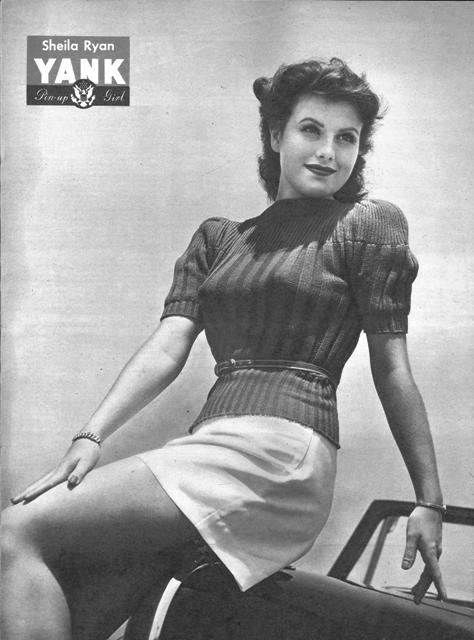
Sheila Ryan pin-up from Yank, The Army Weekly, July 1945

She worked with Gene Autry, co-starring in several of his films, including The Cowboys and the Indians (1949), and Mule Train (1950) as well as with Roy Rogers in films like Song of Texas.

She also had roles in several television shows such as The Lone Ranger, notably the Pete-and-Pedro episode (#7 in 1949) and another entitled "The Whimsical Bandit" in 1950.

Ryan retired from acting in 1968.

== Physical characteristics ==
Ryan had brown hair, was 5 feet, 2 inches tall, and weighed 107 pounds. A 1940 newspaper story included her in a group of actresses "whose alluring curves alone might have disqualified them from screen careers not so long ago," in the words of Travis Banton, a Hollywood stylist.

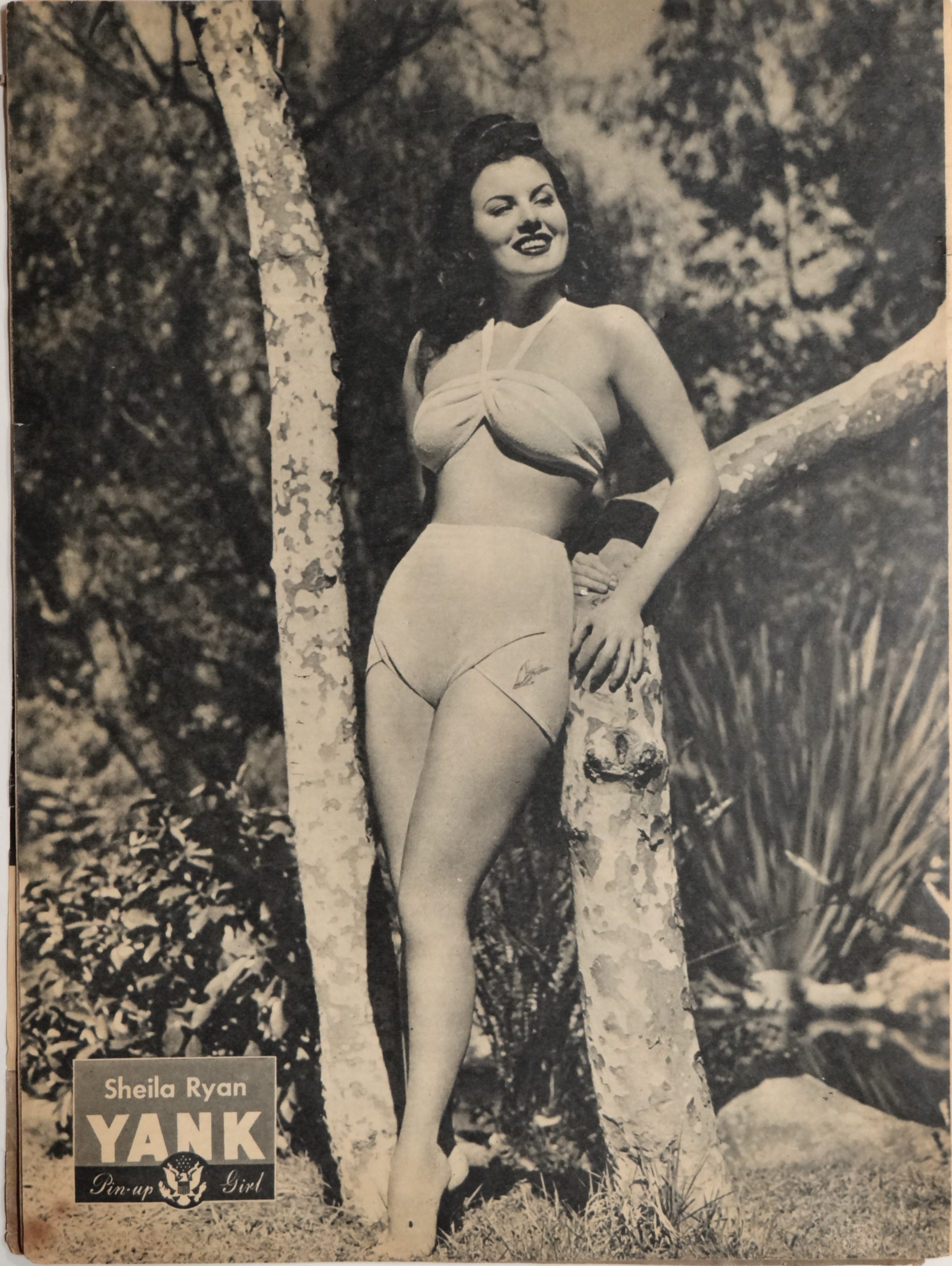
Sheila Ryan pin-up from Yank, The Army Weekly, July 1945

== Personal life ==
Ryan married actor Allan Lane in 1945, but divorced him a year later. Later, she and actor Eddie Norris married, but they had problems in 1948.

While working with Autry, Ryan met actor Pat Buttram. They married in 1950 and remained together until her death in 1975. They had a daughter, Kathleen Buttram, nicknamed Kerry.

Ryan died November 4, 1975, in the Motion Picture Hospital in Woodland Hills, California from lung disease. She was 54 years old. Their daughter Kerry Buttram-Galgano died of cancer in 2007.

== Partial filmography ==
- What a Life (1939) - Jessie
- The Farmer's Daughter (1940) - Dorinda
- Those Were the Days! (1940) - Miss Claire (uncredited)
- The Way of All Flesh (1940) - Mitzi Kriza
- Queen of the Mob (1940) - Party Girl
- I Want a Divorce (1940) - Waitress (uncredited)
- The Gay Caballero (1940) - Susan Wetherby
- Dancing on a Dime (1940) - Brunette (uncredited)
- Life with Henry (1940) - Minor Role (uncredited)
- A Night at Earl Carroll's (1940) - Miss Borgia
- Golden Hoofs (1941) - Gwen
- The Mad Doctor (1941) - Hostess at Charity Bazaar (uncredited)
- Dead Men Tell (1941) - Kate Ransome
- Dressed to Kill (1941) - Connie Earle
- Sun Valley Serenade (1941) - Phone Operator (uncredited)
- We Go Fast (1941) - Diana Hempstead
- Great Guns (1941) - Ginger Hammond
- Pardon My Stripes (1942) - Ruth Stevens
- Lone Star Ranger (1942) - Barbara Longstreth
- Who Is Hope Schuyler? (1942) - Lee Dale
- Footlight Serenade (1942) - Ann, Cowgirl in Movie (uncredited)
- A-Haunting We Will Go (1942) - Margo
- Careful, Soft Shoulders (1942) - Agatha Mather
- Song of Texas (1943) - Sue Bennett
- The Gang's All Here (1943) - Vivian Potter
- Ladies of Washington (1944) - Jerry Dailey
- Something for the Boys (1944) - Melanie Walker
- The Caribbean Mystery (1945) - Mrs. Jean Gilbert
- Getting Gertie's Garter (1945) - Patty Ford
- Deadline for Murder (1946) - Vivian Mason
- Slightly Scandalous (1946) - Christine Wright
- The Lone Wolf in Mexico (1947) - Sharon Montgomery
- The Big Fix (1947) - Lillian
- Heartaches (1947) - Toni Wentworth
- Philo Vance's Secret Mission (1947) - Mona Bannister
- Railroaded! (1947) - Rosie Ryan
- Caged Fury (1948) - Kit Warren
- The Cobra Strikes (1948) - Dale Cameron
- Hideout (1949) - Edie Hanson
- Ringside (1949) - Janet 'J.L.' Brannigan
- Joe Palooka in the Counterpunch (1949) - Myra Madison
- The Cowboy and the Indians (1949) - Doctor Nan
- Mule Train (1950) - Carol Bannister
- Western Pacific Agent (1950) - Martha Stuart
- Square Dance Katy (1950) - Vicky Doran
- Fingerprints Don't Lie (1951) - Carolyn Palmer
- Mask of the Dragon (1951) - Ginny O'Donnell
- Gold Raiders (1951) - Laura
- Jungle Manhunt (1951) - Anne Lawrence
- On Top of Old Smoky (1953) - Lila
- Pack Train (1953) - Lola Riker
- Street of Darkness (1958) - Carmen Flores (final film role)

== See also ==
- Pin-ups of Yank, the Army Weekly
