= O Carnaval Cantado de 1932 =

1932 film

- Directed by: Vital Ramos de Castro
- Written by: Joraci Camargo
- Produced by: Vital Ramos de Castro
- Starring: Carmen Miranda
- Release date: 11 February 1932
- Running time: 40 minutes
- Country: Brazil
- Language: Portuguese

O Carnaval Cantado de 1932 (English: The 1932 Rio Carnival in Song) is a 1932 Brazilian film produced and directed by Vital Ramos de Castro. It is believed to be a lost film.

== Musical numbers ==
- "Bamboleô"
  - Music by André Filho
  - Performed by Carmen Miranda
