= If I'm Lucky (film) =

1946 American comedy directed by Lewis Seiler

- Cover of the DVD release of the film.
- Directed by: Lewis Seiler
- Screenplay by: George Bricker; Robert Ellis; Helen Logan; Snag Werris
- Story by: Edwin Lanham
- Produced by: Bryan Foy
- Starring: Vivian Blaine; Perry Como; Carmen Miranda; Harry James
- Cinematography: Glen MacWilliams
- Edited by: Norman Colbert
- Music by: Leo Robin; Harry Warren
- Distributed by: 20th Century Fox
- Release date: September 2, 1946
- Running time: 78 minutes
- Country: United States
- Language: English

If I'm Lucky is a 1946 American musical comedy film directed by Lewis Seiler and starring Vivian Blaine, Perry Como, Phil Silvers and Carmen Miranda in the leading roles. The film also featured bandleader Harry James.

The film was a re-make of Thanks a Million, a 1935 musical produced and released by 20th Century Fox.

== Plot ==
Band agent Wally Jones sends telegrams to members of a band he represents, which is presently "between engagements;" leader Earl Gordon is blowing bugle at a race track, singer Linda Farrell is selling tickets at a movie theater, harpist Michelle O'Toole is working as a hat-check girl and other band members are playing golf. They are all instructed to go to Centerville, where Wally has arranged for them to audition for the Titan Tire Company's president, Mr. Gillingwater, who wants new talent for his company's radio show. When the band arrives in Centerville, however, they are told by Wally that Gillingwater has hired Benny Goodman instead. Although they have hotel rooms for the night, they are low on cash and contrive to get a free meal at a "Magonnagle for Governor" political rally. The small crowd pays paying little attention to the candidate until Earl and the band start playing, so Magonnagle hires the band to accompany him on the rest of his campaign tour. Magonnagle is running with the slogan, "A Vote for Magonnagle Is a Vote for the Common Man," but has little hope of beating the political machine that is backing corrupt, incumbent Governor Quilby. Composer Allen Clark shows up at one campaign stop, wanting to sell the band a song he has written. Earl buys the song for Linda, but Allen really wants to join the band as a singer. Wally finally hires him, partly to help carry his girl friend Michelle's harp. At one rally, Magonnagle is too drunk to speak and Allen delivers a brief pitch on his behalf. Mark Dwyer, a member of the corrupt State Campaign Committee decides to drop the ineffectual Magonnagle and instead run Allen as a candidate to avoid accusations of fraudulent election practices. Allen doesn't want to be involved, but Wally convinces him that it would be good exposure for his singing talents. Dwyer then introduces Allen to several political appointees, who are all cronies of his, and dupes him into signing continuing "appointments" for them. Allen does so, as he, too, fully expects Quilby to win. After Allen and Linda fall in love, Gillingwater asks the band to join his radio show, and Wally negotiates a thirty-nine-week contract at $10,000 per week. To Allen's surprise and distress, however, the polls indicate that he could win the election. Despite further inducements from the political machine, Allen wants to quit, but Dwyer threatens to break them all by revealing the phony "appointments." To protect them, Allen dismisses the band. Magonnagle then returns and tells Linda about the political crooks backing Allen, and thinking that Allen has become one of them, she leaves with the band. In his closing campaign speech, prompted by Magonnagle, Allen denounces Dwyer and his political machine. Linda and the band hear Allen's speech on their bus's radio and return to help him escape from Dwyer. With Allen safely on board, the bus is pursued by police. When the police finally catch up with the bus, they inform Allen that Quilby has conceded the election to him. His friends convince Allen that he can be both governor and radio singer.

== Production ==
This film's working titles were That's for Me and You're for Me. Edgar Buchanan was borrowed from Columbia Pictures for the production. According to the Twentieth Century-Fox Records of the Legal Department, the "Batucada" number was the last sequence to be shot and was photographed by Joseph La Shelle. The picture is very similar to the 1935 Twentieth Century-Fox production Thanks a Million, but neither credits nor studio information acknowledge that If I'm Lucky is a remake of the earlier film.

If I'm Lucky offered Perry Como the most significant of his three roles for 20th Century Fox. In April 1947, Como terminated his 20th Century Fox contract. That was also the last film of Carmen Miranda with Fox, ending her contract with the studio.

== Cast ==
- Vivian Blaine as Linda Farrell
- Perry Como as Allen Clark
- Harry James as Earl Gordon
- Carmen Miranda as Michelle O'Toole
- Phil Silvers as Wallingham M. 'Wally' Jones
- Edgar Buchanan as Darius J. Magonnagle
- Reed Hadley as Jed Conklin, Magonnagle's Campaign Manager
- Lewis Russell as P.H. Gillingwater
- Harry James and His Music Makers as Themselves (as Harry James' Music Makers)

== Soundtracks ==
All the songs for the film, were written by the team of Josef Myrow and Edgar de Lange and were generally weak affairs. Como's recording of "If I'm Lucky" was a minor hit, reaching #19 in the Hit Parade and spending one week in the charts.

- "Follow the Band" performed by Phil Silvers, Carmen Miranda, Vivian Blaine and Harry James
- "If I'm Lucky" performed by Perry Como and Vivian Blaine
- "One More Kiss" performed by Perry Como
- "Bet Your Bottom Dollar" performed by Vivian Blaine and Carmen Miranda
- "Batucada" performed by Harry James and Carmen Miranda
- "One More Vote" performed by Perry Como

== Critical reception ==
Bosley Crowther’s review of If I’m Lucky in the New York Times is extremely negative. He describes the plot as an absurd and ridiculous fantasy, in which a singer runs for governor to further his own career and that of his musician friends, while exposing a political conspiracy. Crowther finds the story so implausible that even the Marx Brothers' humor wouldn’t have saved it, even if it had been performed in a more exaggerated manner. He criticizes the actors, such as Perry Como, Vivian Blaine, and Carmen Miranda, arguing they lack the qualifications for their roles and that their performances are inconsistent. The songs are also deemed mediocre, and the film as a whole is described as dreary and dull.

Edwin Schallert of the Los Angeles Times partly agrees with Crowther, stating that despite If I’m Lucky’s attempts to present a plausible story, the film ends up being “totally absurd”. Nelson Bell of the Washington Post describes the movie as an attempt at offering "unreflective, ephemeral fun" without depth or substance. Other critics go further, dismissing the plot as merely an excuse to string together musical numbers, with little connection or narrative logic.

In 2008, when If I’m Lucky was re-released on DVD as part of the "20th Century Fox Marquee Musicals" collection, the New York Times noted that in films like Doll Face and If I’m Lucky, Carmen Miranda played supporting roles. The paper questioned how, in the context of the "new realism" that dominated postwar cinema, there could be room for such entirely unreal characters as "The Lady in the Tutti Frutti Hat" (a reference to Miranda's character in The Gang’s All Here).

== Home media ==
The film was released on DVD in June 2008 as part of Fox's "The Carmen Miranda Collection."
