= Tony DeMarco (dancer) =

American dancer (1898–1965)

- Born: Antonio DeMarco; 1 January 1898; Buffalo, New York, US
- Died: 14 November 1965 (aged 67); Palm Beach, Florida, US
- Occupation: Dancer
- Known for: The Dancing DeMarcos

Antonio DeMarco (1 January 1898 – 14 November 1965) was an American burlesque/vaudeville dancer in the first half of the 20th century. With his wife Sally, he performed as "The Dancing DeMarcos", a successful exhibition ballroom dance team in the 1940s.

== Career ==
DeMarco was born in Buffalo, New York, on 1 January 1898. He was the son of a farmer whose own father had lost the family mill in Palermo by neglecting the business to dance at folk festivals around Italy. DeMarco became a dancer despite his father's opposition. He began his career as a solo dancer, then with partners, in burlesque and vaudeville and in Prohibition-era speakeasies.

DeMarco danced with several female partners, of whom the best known were his wives and the ballet and musical theatre star Patricia Bowman. His first wife was Nina Kroner and his second Renée. DeMarco and Renée began dancing together when he was 29 and she was 16. He was best known for his performances with his third wife, Sally Craven, a ballet dancer. Craven doubled for Vivien Leigh in the long shots of dances in Gone with the Wind (1939).

Tony DeMarco became known in 1924 with George White's Scandals. He was the dance director for Harry Carroll's Revue in 1929, and in 1930 performed with Renée in the musical Girl Crazy with Ginger Rogers. Renee and Antonio DeMarco appeared in 1932 in Hotcha! at the Ziegfeld Theatre. For the 1935 film In Caliente, his partner was Sally Craven. The New York Times criticized the film for its lightweight storyline, but said the dancing of the DeMarcos helped to make the picture entertaining.

After that, Tony DeMarco performed solo until 1940. Renée filed for divorce in 1939. In June 1941, Tony announced that Renee was leaving for Reno, Nevada, to get a divorce. Sally Craven danced with Tony DeMarco on Broadway in Boys and Girls Together (1940–41) and Banjo Eyes (1941-42). Tony appeared without Sally in The Gang's All Here (1943) and with her in Crazy House (1943) and Greenwich Village (1944). In the 1940s, Tony and Sally DeMarco earned up to $4,000 per week at upscale supper clubs and hotels. Tony DeMarco and Sally married in 1944.

Exhibition ballroom dancing fell out of vogue in the 1950s with the rise of rock and roll. The DeMarcos nevertheless appeared several times on Ed Sullivan's Toast of the Town. DeMarco also played a few minor roles as a television actor. DeMarco died in Palm Beach, Florida, on 14 November 1965.

== Work ==
DeMarco introduced comic patter and classical music to exhibition ballroom dancing. He brought back the image of a sensuous seducer that was the signature of Rudolph Valentino. The "Dancing DeMarcos" were one of the best known of the exhibition ballroom dance teams of the 1930s and 1940s, along with Veloz and Yolanda and Marge and Gower Champion.

=== Stage ===
- 1914 - Hands Up
- 1925 - Cocoanuts
- 1929 - Music Box Revue
- 1930 - Girl Crazy
- 1932 - Hot-Cha!
- 1935 - Jubilee!
- 1940 - Boys and Girls Together

=== Film ===
- 1935 - In Caliente
- 1938 - The Shining Hour
- 1943 - Crazy House
- 1943 - The Gang's All Here
- 1944 - Greenwich Village
