= A Esposa do Solteiro =

1926 film

- Directed by: Carlo Campogalliani
- Written by: Carlo Campogalliani
- Starring: Carlo Campogalliani; Letizia Quaranta; Augusto Gonçalves; Polly de Viana
- Cinematography: Paulo Benedetti
- Production company: Benedetti Filme
- Release date: 1926
- Country: Brazil
- Language: Portuguese

A Esposa do Solteiro (also known as La mujer de medianoche) is a 1926 Brazilian film directed by Carlo Campogalliani. It was Carmen Miranda's first film. It is believed to be a lost film.

== Cast ==
- Paulo Benedetti
- Carlo Campogalliani as Jorge Peirada
- Amália de Oliveira
- Polly de Viana
- Bastos Estefânio
- Augusto Gonçalves as Mena
- Luiz Lizman
- Lia Lupini
- Letizia Quaranta
- Alberto Sereno
- Ivo Soares
- Luiza Valle
- Carmen Miranda
