= Phil Baker (comedian) =

American comedian (1896–1963)

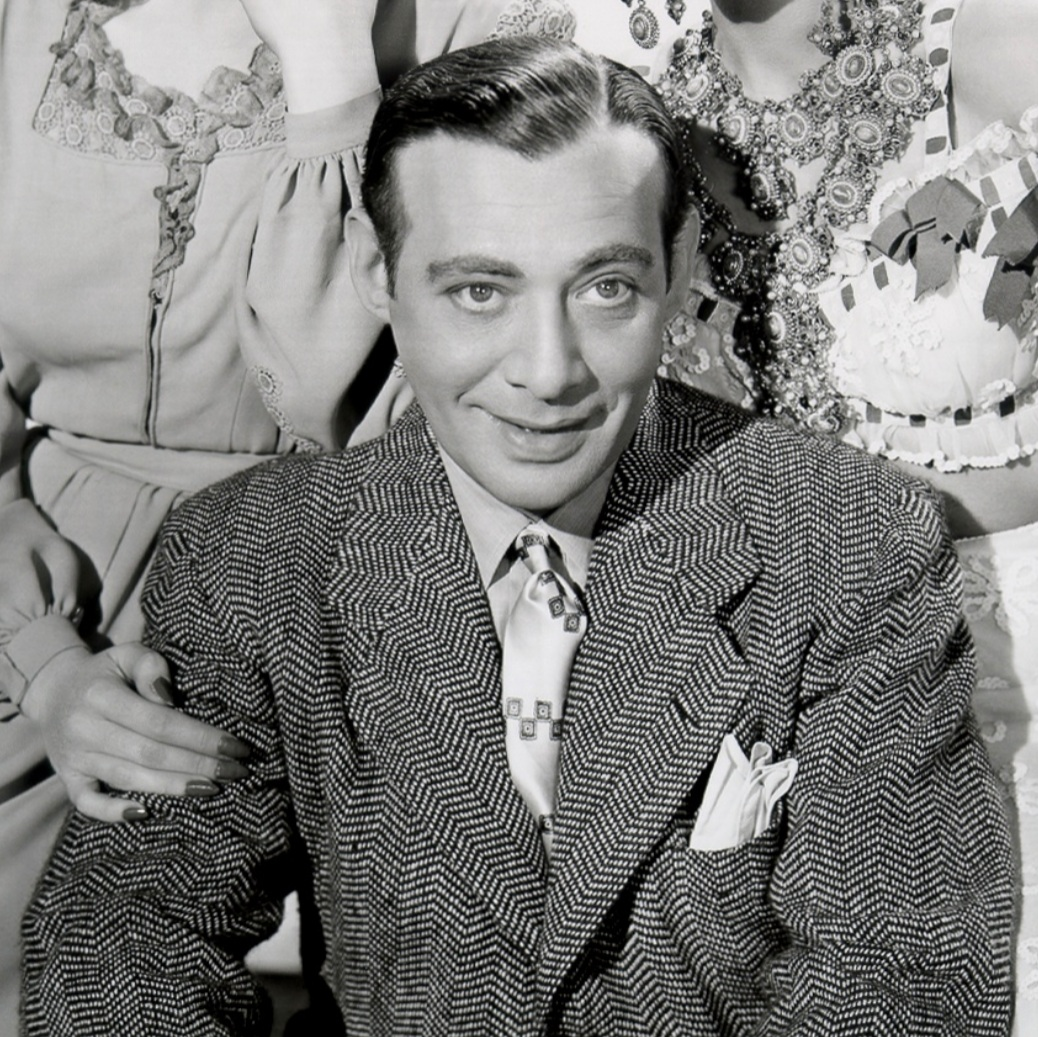
- Baker in The Gang's All Here (1943)
- Born: August 26, 1896; Philadelphia, Pennsylvania, U.S.
- Died: November 30, 1963 (aged 67); Copenhagen, Denmark
- Occupations: Actor; comedian; composer; songwriter; accordionist; author
- Years active: 1915–1960
- Spouses: Peggy Cartwright (m. 1932; div. 1941) Irmgard Erik (m. 1944)
- Children: 6

Phil Baker (August 26, 1896 – November 30, 1963) was an American comedian and emcee on radio. Baker was also a vaudeville actor, composer, songwriter, accordionist and author.

== Biography ==
He was born on August 26, 1896, in Philadelphia, Pennsylvania.

Baker went to school in Boston, and his first stage appearance was in a Boston amateur show. Baker began in vaudeville playing the piano for violinist Ed Janis, and he was 19 when he teamed with Ben Bernie for the vaudeville act "Bernie and Baker." This originally was a serious musical act with Baker on accordion and Bernie on violin but eventually ended up with comic elements. After breaking with Bernie shortly after World War I, Baker partnered with Sid Silvers up until 1928.

Baker went on to pursue a successful solo career. His solo act included him singing, playing the accordion, telling jokes and being heckled by a planted audience member called Jojo. With this act, Baker played the Palace Theatre in 1930 and 1931.

In 1923, Baker appeared in an early DeForest Phonofilm short A Musical Monologue in which he played the accordion and sang. Bernie also appeared in a DeForest Phonofilm Ben Bernie and All the Lads featuring Bernie's band and pianist Oscar Levant. During World War I Baker served in the US Navy.

Baker appeared with Carmen Miranda in the musical The Gang's All Here (1943).

On radio, he starred in his own series The Armour Jester on NBC. In the 1940s he appeared on Duffy's Tavern on February 22, 1944, and was the host of the quiz show Take It or Leave It, which later changed its name to The $64 Question.

Phil Baker appeared briefly on television. In 1951 he hosted the panel quiz show Who's Whose. The show, and Baker's performance, were both universally panned, so much so that the show was canceled after one episode and Baker had his contract bought out.

He was inducted into the Hollywood Walk of Fame with a star on February 8, 1960.

== Death ==
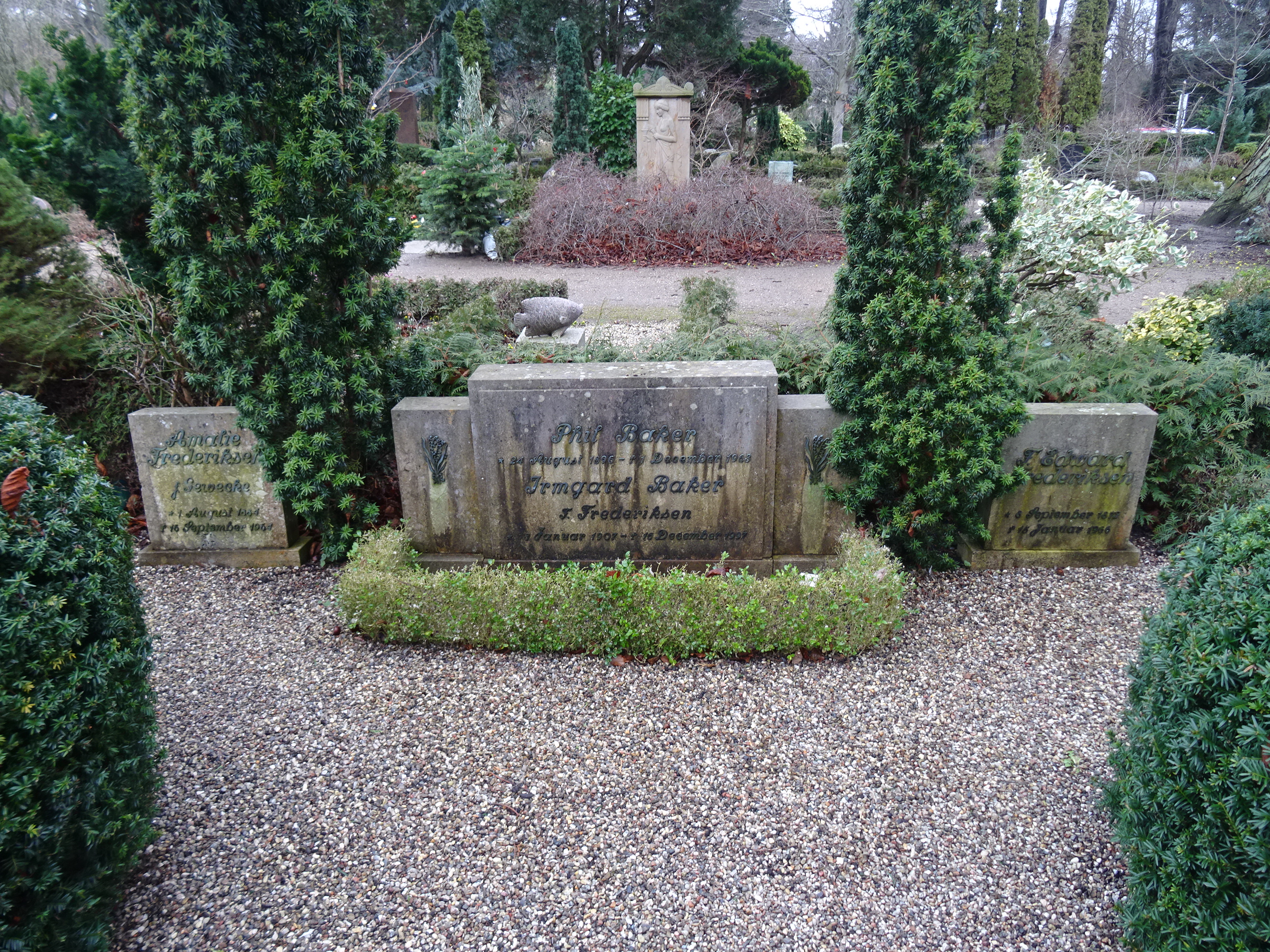
Grave of Phil Baker in Copenhagen

Baker moved to Copenhagen, Denmark in 1960, where his second wife was born. He later died on November 30, 1963, in Copenhagen.

== Legacy ==
Baker had four children with actress Peggy Cartwright, including well-known composer Michael Conway Baker. Baker later married Irmgard Erik, a Danish model, with whom he had two children. Irmgard Erik Baker died in December 1997. Baker's likeness was drawn in caricature by Alex Gard for the walls of Sardi's, the New York City Theater District restaurant. That picture is now part of the collection of the New York Public Library.

== Broadway ==
Baker appeared in a number of Broadway musicals:

- Music Box Revue (1923)
- Artists and Models (1925)
- A Night in Spain (1927)
- Billy Rose's Crazy Quilt (1931)
- Greenwich Village Follies
- Calling All Stars (1934)

He also produced Geraniums in My Window (1934) and Cafe de Danse (1929).

== Compositions ==
Baker composed many songs, including:

- "Park Avenue Strut"
- "Look At Those Eyes"
- "Just Suppose"
- "Antoinette"
- "Strange Interlude"
- "Humming a Love Song"
- "Rainy Day Pal"
- "Pretty Little Baby"
- "Did You Mean It?"
- "My Heaven on Earth"
- "Invitation to a Broken Heart"

== Filmography ==
Year	Title	Role	Notes
1934	Gift of Gab	Himself - Absent-Minded Doctor	
1938	The Goldwyn Follies	Michael Day	
1943	The Gang's All Here	Himself	
1944	Take It or Leave It	Himself	
1960	The Greeneyed Elephant	Arthur Croft	(final film role)
