= The Gang's All Here (1943 film) =

1943 film by Busby Berkeley

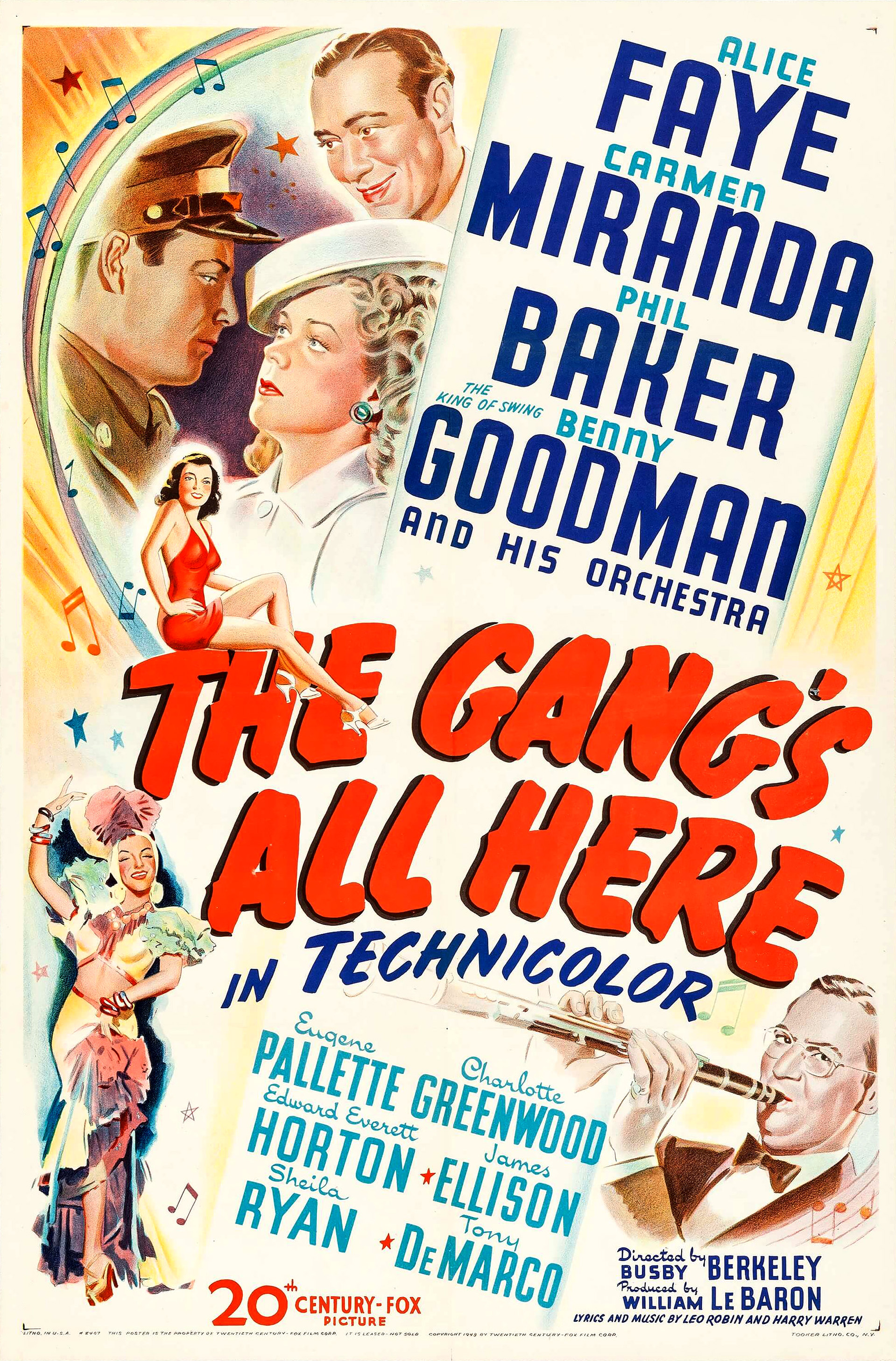
- Theatrical release poster
- Directed by: Busby Berkeley
- Screenplay by: Walter Bullock
- Story by: Nancy Wintner; George Root Jr. Tom Bridges
- Produced by: William LeBaron
- Starring: Alice Faye; Carmen Miranda; Phil Baker; Benny Goodman; Benny Goodman Orchestra; Eugene Pallette; Charlotte Greenwood; Edward Everett Horton; James Ellison; Sheila Ryan; Tony DeMarco
- Cinematography: Edward Cronjager
- Edited by: Ray Curtiss
- Music by: Leo Robin; Harry Warren
- Distributed by: 20th Century Fox
- Release date: December 24, 1943
- Running time: 103 minutes
- Country: United States
- Language: English
- Box office: $2.5 million

The Gang's All Here is a 1943 American Twentieth Century Fox Technicolor musical film starring Alice Faye, Carmen Miranda and James Ellison. The film, directed and choreographed by Busby Berkeley, is known for its use of musical numbers with fruit hats. Included among the 10 highest-grossing films of that year, it was at that time Fox's most expensive production.

Musical highlights include Carmen Miranda performing an insinuating, witty version of "You Discover You're in New York" that lampoons fads, fashions, and wartime shortages of the time. The film features Miranda's "The Lady in the Tutti Frutti Hat" which, because of its sexual innuendo (dozens of scantily clad women handling very large bananas), apparently prevented the film from being shown in Brazil on its initial release. In the US, the censors dictated that the chorus girls must hold the bananas at the waist and not at the hip. Alice Faye sings "A Journey to a Star," "No Love, No Nothin'," and the surreal finale "The Polka-Dot Polka."

The film was nominated for an Academy Award for Best Art Direction-Interior Decoration, Color (James Basevi, Joseph C. Wright, Thomas Little). It was the last musical Faye made as a Hollywood superstar. She was pregnant with her second daughter during filming. In 2014, The Gang's All Here was deemed "culturally, historically, or aesthetically significant" by the Library of Congress and selected for preservation in the National Film Registry.

== Plot ==
A man sings "Brazil" as the opening credits fade to the disembarkation of a ship, SS Brazil. As the exotic goods are netted off the ship the camera pans down to the archetypal exotic fruit hat on Carmen Miranda who reprises the song.

Wealthy businessman Andrew J. "A. J." Mason Sr. takes his nervous partner, Peyton Potter, to the Club New Yorker for a celebratory evening with his son, Sgt. Andrew J. Mason Jr., who is about to report for active duty in the Army. A. J. and Andy enjoy the show, which features master of ceremonies Phil Baker and dancer Tony De Marco, while Potter worries about what his wife Blossom would say if she knew he was there. While Potter is trapped into dancing with Brazilian sensation Dorita, Andy becomes intrigued by entertainer Eadie Allen. Phil warns Andy that because Eadie dances at the Broadway Canteen between shows, she will not go out on a date with him, but Andy follows her to the canteen and tells her that his name is Sgt. Pat Casey so that she will not be intimidated by his wealth. Despite her insistence that she cannot date servicemen outside the canteen, Eadie is charmed by Andy and agrees to meet him later when he pursues her to the nightclub. Eadie and Andy spend the evening talking and falling in love, and the next day, Eadie bids him farewell at the train station and promises to write every day.

Andy distinguishes himself in battle in the South Pacific, and is granted a furlough after being awarded a medal. A. J. is thrilled and plans to throw a welcome home party for Andy at the Club New Yorker. Phil cannot accommodate his plans, however, as the club is closed for two weeks while the company rehearses a new show. Munificent as always, A. J. invites the performers to rehearse at his and Potter's homes, where they can throw a lavish garden party and war bond rally to welcome Andy. Potter is perturbed about the arrangements when he learns that Blossom knows Phil from her former days as an entertainer, and his chagrin grows when Tony's partner cannot perform and he asks Potter's daughter Vivian to dance with him. Hoping to persuade the stodgy Potter to allow Vivian to perform, Blossom tells him that Phil has threatened to reveal her wild past if Vivian is not in the show. Potter acquiesces, but his problems grow when he is pursued by the romantic-minded Dorita. When not chasing Potter, Dorita learns that Vivian has a boyfriend named Andy, and that he and Eadie's "Casey" are the same man.

Complications arise as Dorita tries to keep Vivian and Eadie from discovering Andy's deception. When Andy and the real Pat Casey arrive at the house, however, Eadie learns the truth. Andy proclaims that he wants to marry her and not Vivian, but Eadie insists on breaking off their relationship, as she believes that Vivian really cares for him. During the show, however, Vivian tells Eadie that she is going to Broadway to perform as Tony's permanent partner, and reveals that she and Andy were never truly in love. As the show comes to a close, Eadie and Andy reconcile, and everyone joins in the final song.

== Cast ==
- Alice Faye as Eadie Allen
- Carmen Miranda as Dorita
- Phil Baker as Phil Baker
- Benny Goodman as Himself
- Benny Goodman Orchestra as Themselves
- Eugene Pallette as Andrew Mason Sr.
- Charlotte Greenwood as Blossom Potter
- Edward Everett Horton as Peyton Potter
- Tony DeMarco as Himself
- James Ellison as Andy Mason
- Sheila Ryan as Vivian Potter
- Dave Willock as Sgt. Pat Casey
- Bando da Lua ... Themselves, Carmen Miranda's Orchestra
- Leon Belasco as Waiter
- Brooks Benedict as Club New Yorker Patron
- Jeanne Crain as Chorus Girl/Pool Party Guest
- Frank Darien as Stage Doorman
- Johnny Duncan as Jitterbug Dancer
- Herbert Evans as Club New Yorker patron
- Frank Faylen as the Marine sergeant
- June Haver as a chorus Girl / hat check girl
- Leyland Hodgson as the butler
- Adele Jergens as a chorus girl
- Virginia Sale as Miss Custer, the secretary
- Billie Seward as a dancer
- Miriam LaVelle as the acrobatic dancer (uncredited)
- Lillian Yarbo as the maid (uncredited)

== Production ==
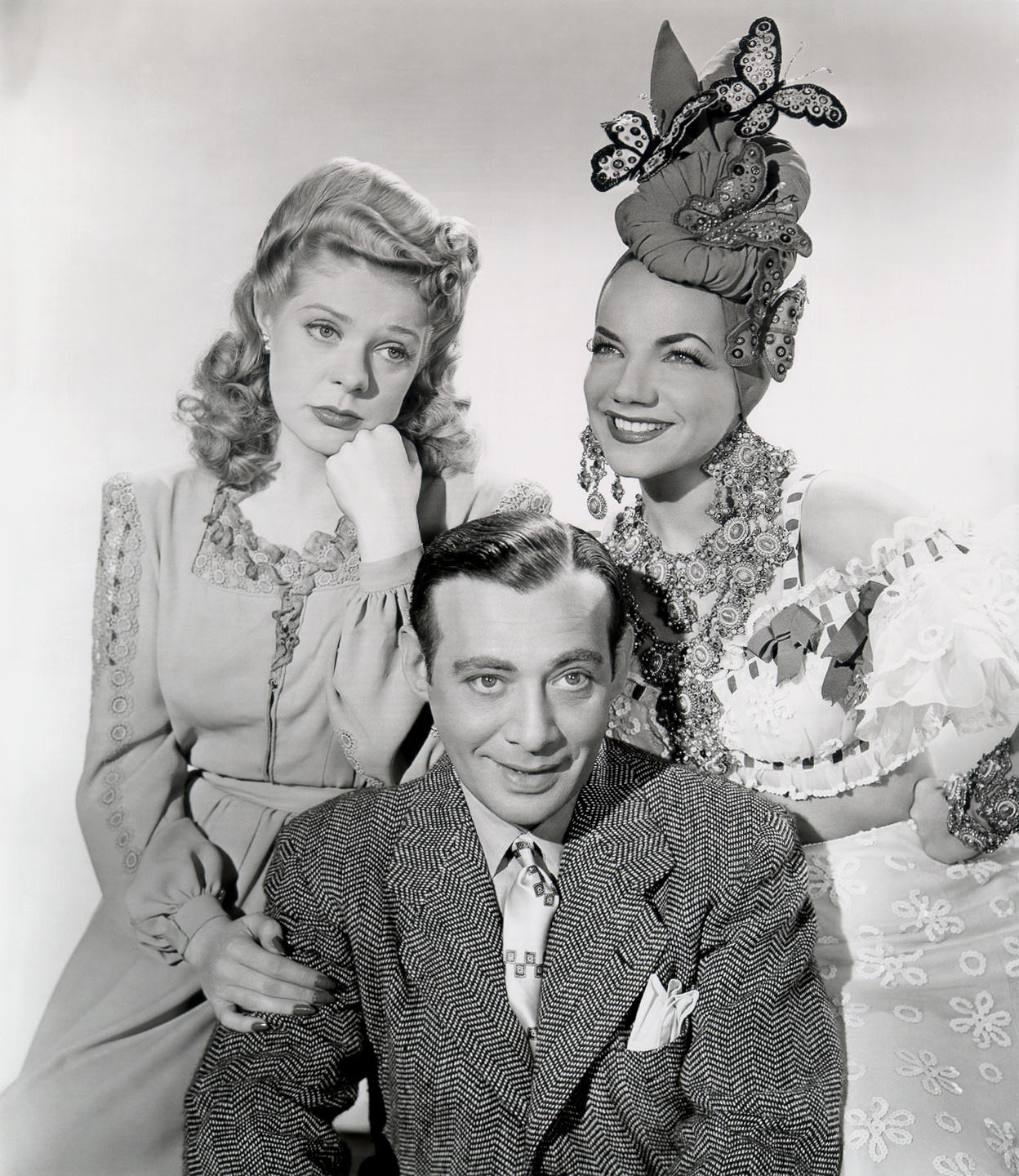
Left to right: Alice Faye, Phil Baker, and Carmen Miranda in The Gang's All Here (1943).

Miranda became known for the signature fruit hat outfit she wore in her American films, especially in The Gang's All Here.

The working title of this film was The Girls He Left Behind. According to a January 7, 1943 news item, composer Harry Warren was originally scheduled to work with lyricist Mack Gordon on the film's score, but Warren instead wrote the picture's songs with Leo Robin. A news in The Hollywood Reporter on 30 March 1943 included "Pickin' on Your Momma" in the list of songs to be featured in the film. Modern sources note that the song, along with "Sleepy Moon" and "Drums and Dreams" were cut before the final release. According to The Hollywood Reporter and a studio press release, Linda Darnell was originally scheduled to play "Vivian Potter," which would have been her first dancing role in motion pictures. During dance rehearsals, however, Darnell sprained her ankle, and after her recovery, eloped with cinematographer Peverell Marley and asked Twentieth Century-Fox for an indefinite leave of absence. Darnell was replaced in the role by Sheila Ryan.

The Gang's All Here began production in April 1943. Berkeley learned that Darryl F. Zanuck would not be overseeing the production. Fox's studio head was in Europe on behalf of the war effort, leaving the chore to William LeBaron, a producer and songwriter who had worked at other studios before coming to Fox. Under Zanuck, he set up an independent unit at the studio, mostly making musicals. He and Berkeley got along well at first, but the relationship soon was strained as the showman in Berkeley would not yield to the budget-trimming mandates of LeBaron (who, in turn, was forced to trim expenses due to the demands of the War Production Board, which sought cost cutting in all aspects of businesses during the war). In spite of the producer/director discord during shooting, the film turned out to be an outrageously conceived work of art, blending with subtlety the politics of alliances while overtly disarming the viewing public with surrealism and spectacle.

Although Alice Faye did have a singing cameo in the 1944 film Four Jills in a Jeep, this picture marked her last appearance in a musical film until State Fair (1962). Faye, who was pregnant with her second child during filming of The Gang's All Here, retired from the screen and only made one film in the intervening period, the drama Fallen Angel (1945). The Gang's All Here marked the screen debuts of actresses June Haver (1926–2005), Jeanne Crain (1925–2003) and Jo-Carroll Dennison, who was Miss America of 1942. According to an article in the Los Angeles Times, the film was to include a parody of Phil Baker's radio show Take It or Leave It. The sequence was cut, and Baker instead made an entire film based on the show, called Take It or Leave It, for Twentieth Century-Fox.

The Gang's All Here was the first color film entirely directed by Berkeley (he had earlier directed dance numbers for the 1930 two-color Technicolor film Whoopee!), and the extravagant production numbers were well received. While praising Berkeley's work, the MPH reviewer commented that the production numbers "are opulent in highly effective color combinations and are climaxed by a finale in the cubistic and modernistic tempo which is different from anything that has passed this reviewer's way since some of the abstract treatments employed by Walt Disney's Fantasia." Although some modern sources indicate that the film was banned in Brazil because of the giant bananas featured in "The Lady with Tutti-Frutti Hat" number, the film's file in the Motion Picture Production Code Collection at the AMPAS Library contained no information about censorship in Brazil and the film was approved for export to South American countries. The picture received an Academy Award nomination in the Art Direction (Color) category.

Jazz drummer Louie Bellson appears uncredited in the Benny Goodman Orchestra while Carmen Miranda sings "Paducah".

== Soundtrack ==
- "Hail, Hail, the Gang's All Here"
  - Music by Theodore Morse and Arthur Sullivan
  - Lyrics by Dolly Morse (as D.A. Esrom)
- "Brazil" ("Aquarela do Brasil")
  - Music by Ary Barroso
  - English lyrics by S.K. Russell
  - Sung by Nestor Amaral, Carmen Miranda and chorus
- "You Discover You're in New York"
  - Music by Harry Warren
  - Lyrics by Leo Robin
  - Performed by Carmen Miranda, Alice Faye, Phil Baker and chorus
- "Minnie's in the Money"
  - Music by Harry Warren
  - Lyrics by Leo Robin
  - Arranged by Eddie Sauter
  - Sung by Benny Goodman with his band and a jitterbug chorus
- "Soft Winds"
  - Written by Benny Goodman (instrumental)
  - Played by Benny Goodman and His Orchestra
  - Danced by Alice Faye and James Ellison
- "The Lady in the Tutti Frutti Hat"
  - Music by Harry Warren
  - Lyrics by Leo Robin
  - Performed by Carmen Miranda and chorus
- "A Journey to a Star"
  - Music by Harry Warren
  - Lyrics by Leo Robin
  - Sung by Alice Faye (and reprised by cast)
  - Danced by Tony De Marco and Sheila Ryan
- "The Jitters"
  - Music by Gene Rose
  - Played by Benny Goodman and His Orchestra
  - Danced by Charlotte Greenwood and Charles Saggau
- "No Love, No Nothin"
  - Music by Harry Warren
  - Lyrics by Leo Robin
  - Arranged by Benny Carter
  - Sung by Alice Faye
  - Danced by Tony De Marco and Sheila Ryan
- "(I've Got a Gal in) Kalamazoo"
  - Music by Harry Warren
  - Lyrics by Mack Gordon
  - Played by Benny Goodman and his band
- "Paducah"
  - Music by Harry Warren
  - Lyrics by Leo Robin
  - Played by Benny Goodman and His Orchestra
  - Sung by Benny Goodman and Carmen Miranda
  - Danced by Carmen Miranda and Tony De Marco
- "The Polka Dot Polka"
  - Music by Harry Warren
  - Lyrics by Leo Robin
  - Sung by Alice Faye with dancers
- "The Polka Dot Ballet"
  - Music by Harry Warren
  - Performed by Busby Berkeley dancers
- "A Hot Time in the Old Town"
  - Music by Theo. A. Metz
- "Silent Señorita"
  - Music by Harry Warren
  - Lyrics by Leo Robin
- "Valse des rayons" from Le Papillon aka "Valse chaloupée"
  - Music by Jacques Offenbach
- "P'ra Que Discutir"
  - Written by Nestor Amaral
- "Diga o Ella"
  - Written by Nestor Amaral
- "Let's Dance"
  - Written by Gregory Stone, Josef Bonime and Fanny Baldridge.

== Release ==
The film was released on December 24, 1943. The Gang's All Here it became one of the 25 top-grossing films of 1943–44.

== Critical reception ==
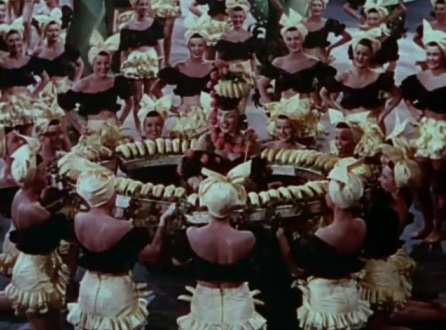
Carmen Miranda as Dorita in a scene from the film The Gang's All Here.

The New York Times review describes The Gang's All Here as a visually stunning musical, thanks to its use of Technicolor, but disappointing in terms of content and narrative. The film features a well-known cast, including Alice Faye, Carmen Miranda, and Benny Goodman, and presents a predictable plot filled with clichés, centered around nightclub performers staying at a wealthy businessman's rural estate during wartime efforts. Although directed by Busby Berkeley, famous for his elaborate musical sequences, the numbers are considered lavish but lacking in emotion and innovation. The songs are described as plentiful but forgettable, while the sets and costumes are noted as the most creative aspects of the production. Overall, the review concludes that while the spectacle impresses visually, it fails to deliver an engaging or substantial experience.

The critic Don Druker from the Chicago Reader considers The Gang's All Here Busby Berkeley's most daring film, highlighting it as an innovative exploration of movement and color that reaches the realm of pure abstraction. Sexual symbolism is described as prominent, with iconic moments, such as the scene of 60 girls swinging giant bananas. Berkeley also pushes his aesthetic to its limits by disembodying the characters, culminating in a surreal sequence where heads float in a field of golden and amber tones.

Philip French, from The Guardian, describes The Gang's All Here as Busby Berkeley's boldest and most delirious work, marking a high point in his career and serving as a "time capsule of the 1940s." It was Berkeley's first color film, produced at 20th Century Fox during World War II, with the aim of boosting morale and supporting the war effort. The simple plot follows a decorated soldier returning from the war to reunite with his love, a nightclub singer in New York, with events like a war bond gala interspersed between the main scenes. Carmen Miranda, with her extravagant costumes and international appeal, symbolizes Roosevelt's Good Neighbor Policy and attracted Latin American audiences. Her performances in numbers like "The Lady in the Tutti Frutti Hat" and "Polka Dot Polka" showcase the extravagance and sexual symbolism of Berkeley's "paroxysmal production numbers." The film also features memorable performances by Alice Faye singing the nostalgic ballad "No Love, No Nothin’," and Benny Goodman and his orchestra, representing the big band era.

Craig Williams, from CineVue, describes The Gang's All Here as Busby Berkeley's creative pinnacle and a masterpiece of the musical genre. Borrowed from MGM to 20th Century Fox, the director explored unprecedented artistic freedom, crafting a vibrant and imaginative spectacle that served as a form of escapism for a war-torn country. While the songs don't have the same impact as earlier classics, the dance numbers make up for it with extravagance and innovation. A standout is "The Lady in the Tutti Frutti Hat", a bold, suggestive number that faced censorship but became iconic for its creativity and symbolism. Benny Goodman and his band bring a grounded energy that contrasts and complements Berkeley's surreal moments. Berkeley's direction is praised for its dynamic camera work and surrealistic sets that come to life, while Carmen Miranda and Alice Faye anchor the numbers with their charismatic performances. The film masterfully blends contrasting styles, delivering a breathtaking cinematic spectacle regarded as the peak of Berkeley's artistic expression and the musical genre.

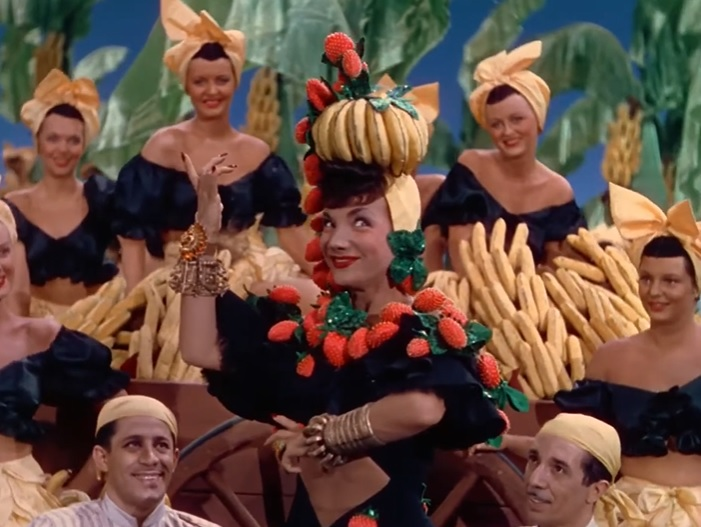
The musical number "The Lady in the Tutti Frutti Hat", performed by Carmen Miranda in the film The Gang's All Here.

Lou Lumenick, in his 2005 review for the New York Post, celebrates The Gang's All Here as one of the most extravagant films ever made, highlighting its vibrant Technicolor aesthetic and iconic musical numbers. The film is famous for scenes like "The Lady in the Tutti-Frutti Hat," where Carmen Miranda performs with chorus girls wielding giant bananas, and the psychedelic final number, "The Polka Dot Polka," where the disembodied heads of the stars sing. Rediscovered in the 1970s, the film amazed a new generation with its spectacular colors, restored through the Technicolor dye transfer process. Lumenick emphasizes the visual and creative impact of the film, which remains unique within the musical genre, blending escapism, surrealism, and artistic extravagance.

Inácio Araújo, a film critic for the Brazilian newspaper Folha de S.Paulo, describes The Gang's All Here as an old-fashioned musical centered on the challenges of putting together a show, with a touch of romance. However, he points out that beneath this conventional premise, director-choreographer Busby Berkeley creates delirious choreography, using bold camera angles to transform the scenes into true visual works of art. Araújo emphasizes that, with Carmen Miranda and her iconic balangandãs, Berkeley constructs a festive and sensual image that, while evoking South America, seems more like a symbolic representation of the filmmaker's imagination and creative mind.

The Variety review describes the film as having a weak script, based on a story by Nancy Wintner, George Root Jr., and Tom Bridges, but notes that the musical numbers help compensate for this flaw. Alice Faye is praised for her charming screen presence, and her ballads are well received. Carmen Miranda is given a substantial role, excelling as both a comedienne and a performer of South American rhythm tunes. Phil Baker does his best with underwhelming comedic lines, while Benny Goodman's orchestra is prominently featured throughout the film.

== Awards and honors ==
- 16th Academy Awards (1944)

Best Art Direction-Interior Decoration, Color (Nominated)

- National Film Registry (2014)

In 2014, The Gang's All Here was deemed "culturally, historically, or aesthetically significant" by the Library of Congress and selected for preservation in the National Film Registry.

The film is recognized by American Film Institute in these lists:

- 2004: AFI's 100 Years...100 Songs:
  - "The Lady in the Tutti-Frutti Hat" – Nominated
- 2006: AFI's Greatest Movie Musicals – Nominated

== Home media ==
The Gang's All Here first appeared on LaserDisc in 1997 from 20th Century Fox Home Entertainment. Fox first released the film on DVD in 2007 as part of The Alice Faye Collection, but the transfer was criticized for its faded color reproduction subduing the original vibrant Technicolor hues. It was rereleased on DVD in 2008 as part of Fox's The Carmen Miranda Collection; this edition contained a brighter and more colorful transfer.

In 2014, Eureka Entertainment in the UK released the film on a region B Blu-ray as part of their Masters of Cinema series. This edition preserved the vibrant color scheme. In 2016, Twilight Time in the US released a region 0, limited edition Blu-ray of 3,000 units. Though also fully restored, it used a much duller, darker transfer than the Eureka.
