= The Lady in the Tutti Frutti Hat =

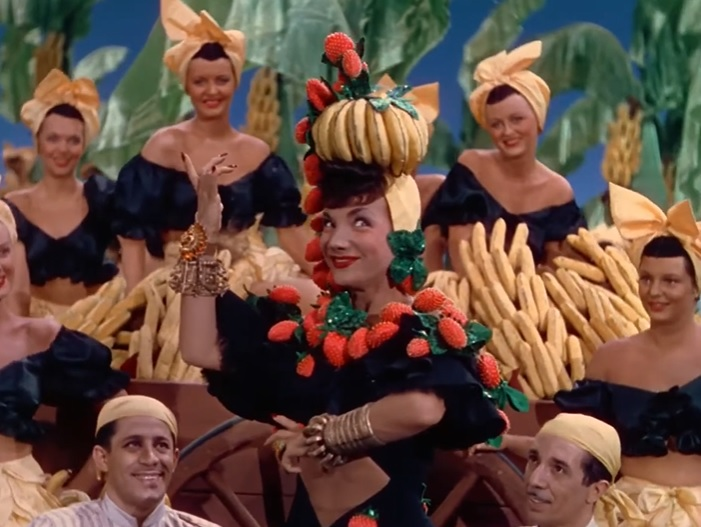

Song by Carmen Miranda
- Released: 1943
- Genre: Pop
- Songwriter(s): Leo Robin
- Composer(s): Harry Warren

The Lady in the Tutti Frutti Hat is a song composed by Harry Warren and Leo Robin, performed by Carmen Miranda in the 1943 musical film The Gang's All Here.

This was the first Technicolor film directed by Busby Berkeley, whose extravagant musical numbers received critical acclaim—particularly the iconic scene featuring “The Lady in the Tutti Frutti Hat.” In this lavish sequence, dancers hold oversized bananas—each about half a meter long—which some critics interpret as a playful yet suggestive metaphor. The performance culminates with Carmen Miranda balancing a large bunch of bananas on her head, reinforcing her trademark fruit-laden style.

== Background ==
Carmen Miranda moved to Los Angeles in 1940, and soon began starring in a series of musicals for 20th Century-Fox. In 1941, she appeared in That Night in Rio and later that same year in Week-End in Havana. As her popularity grew, producers began giving her more lines and greater on-screen visibility.

By 1943, Fox hired Busby Berkeley to direct The Gang’s All Here, a lavish wartime musical that would feature one of Carmen Miranda’s most unforgettable performances—“The Lady in the Tutti Frutti Hat.”

This musical number, directed and choreographed by Berkeley, became one of the most visually memorable sequences of 1940s Hollywood. It encapsulates the vibrant style, humor, and flair that helped establish Carmen Miranda as a global pop icon.

== Visual Style and Symbolism ==
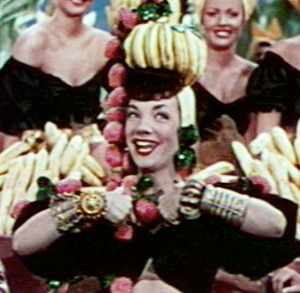
Carmen Miranda in The Gang's All Here (1943).

The scene is renowned for its grandiose choreography, blending geometric formations, hypnotic patterns, and surreal props. The oversized bananas, while humorous, also contribute to a spectacle of exaggerated sensuality. Miranda’s costume—including her signature fruit-covered turban—further amplifies the theatricality of the number.

The film’s use of Technicolor, then a relatively new innovation, enhances the vibrant and tropical aesthetic of the performance. Berkeley’s distinctive direction—with symmetrical compositions and elaborate camera movements—transforms the scene into a surreal and hypnotic experience.

== Historical and Cultural Context ==
The musical number reflects the cultural atmosphere of the time, particularly the influence of the United States’ “Good Neighbor Policy” during World War II, which sought to strengthen ties with Latin America. Hollywood often depicted Latin American culture through a romanticized and stereotypical lens, and while Carmen Miranda—a Brazilian artist—was absorbed into this framework, she also transcended it.

Through her charisma, comedic timing, and magnetic stage presence, Miranda transformed these clichés into personal trademarks. Her performance in The Gang’s All Here became a bold and colorful expression of identity, blurring the lines between parody and celebration.

== Cultural Impact ==
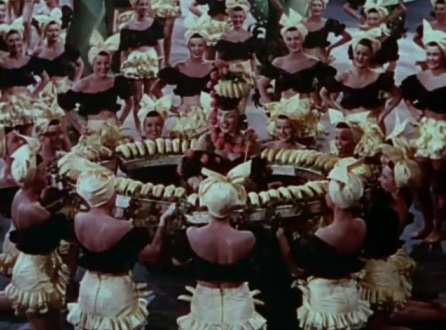
Carmen Miranda singing "The Lady in the Tutti Frutti Hat" in The Gang's All Here, 1943

“The Lady in the Tutti Frutti Hat” became a cultural phenomenon, referenced and parodied in countless forms of media over the decades. Classic cartoons like Looney Tunes and Tom & Jerry often depicted characters—human or animal—wearing fruit-filled turbans in direct homage to Carmen Miranda.

Her image became a powerful pop culture symbol of tropical exuberance, influencing fashion, advertising, and Carnival costumes across generations. The performance, and especially her outfit, became synonymous with joy, color, and extravagance.

In film and television, the number continues to be referenced. For example: In The Simpsons, characters like Homer and Bart wear fruit hats in homage to Carmen. In The Mask (1994), Jim Carrey performs a tropical-inspired dance sequence reminiscent of her style.

== Legacy in Pop Culture and Fashion ==
Carmen Miranda’s influence has transcended eras, inspiring contemporary artists such as Madonna, Katy Perry, and Anitta who incorporate tropical elements and over-the-top costumes into their performances. Her style is also embraced by cabaret performers and drag queens, who continue to reinterpret her look on global stages.

Comedy shows like Saturday Night Live have used “The Lady in the Tutti Frutti Hat” in comedic sketches, while artists and designers have repeatedly drawn from her imagery. In fashion, iconic designers like Miuccia Prada and Jean-Paul Gaultier have cited Carmen Miranda as a major influence in collections that celebrate tropical flair and performative femininity.

== Legacy ==
In December 2014, the Library of Congress recognized The Gang’s All Here as “culturally, historically, or aesthetically significant” and selected it for preservation in the National Film Registry. Additionally, the film was nominated by the American Film Institute (AFI) in 2004 and 2006 for two of its prestigious lists: 100 Years... 100 Songs (for “The Lady in the Tutti Frutti Hat”) and The Greatest Movie Musicals, respectively. In 2018, Billboard magazine ranked “The Lady in the Tutti Frutti Hat” at number 65 on its list of the “100 Best Acting Performances by Musicians in Movies.”
